= List of Catholic churches in the United Kingdom =

Catholic Churches in the United Kingdom

This is a list of Catholic churches in the United Kingdom, including notable current and former individual church buildings and congregations and administration. These churches are listed buildings or have been recognised for their historical importance, or are church congregations notable for reasons unrelated to their buildings. These generally are or were members of the Catholic Church of Scotland, Catholic Church of England and Wales and of the Catholic Church of the Isle of Man and those in Northern Ireland of the Catholic Church in Ireland.

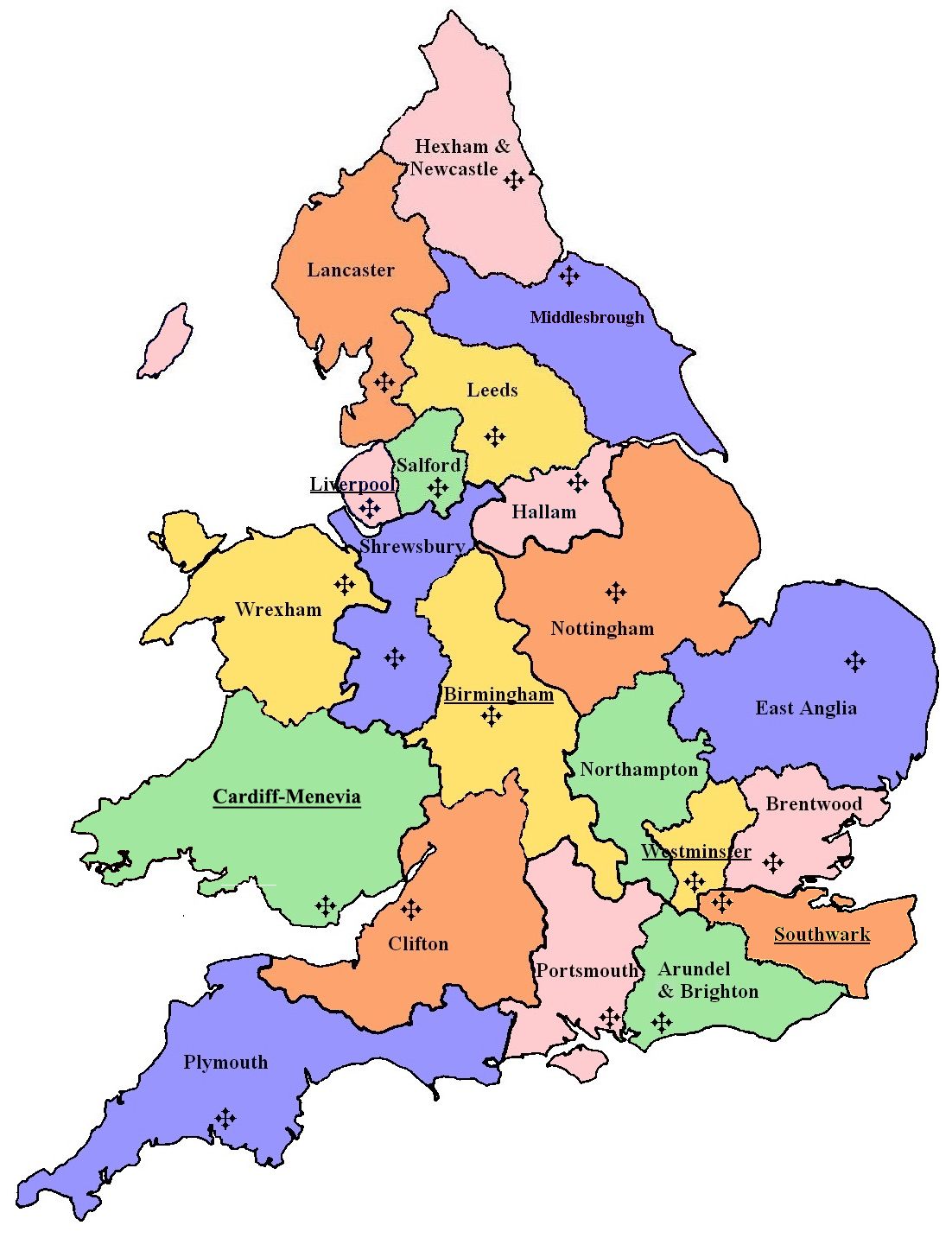
Catholic dioceses in England and Wales

== England ==
Sorted according to the ceremonial counties of England, although there are also 20 Catholic dioceses in England, divided into 5 ecclesiastical provinces: Birmingham, Cardiff (for Herefordshire), Liverpool, Southwark and Westminster.

=== Bedfordshire ===
In the Diocese of Northampton:

- Church of the Sacred Heart of Jesus and St Cuthbert
- Our Lady Help of Christians Church, Luton
- St Francis of Assisi Church, Shefford
- Turvey Abbey

=== Berkshire ===
In the Diocese of Portsmouth:

- Douai Abbey
- St Cassian's Centre, Kintbury
- St Joseph's Church, Maidenhead
- St Joseph's Church, Newbury
- St James's Church, Reading
- Reading Abbey
- Sacred Heart Church, Reading
- Corpus Christi Catholic Church, Wokingham

In the Diocese of Northampton:

- St Ethelbert's Church, Slough

=== Bristol ===
In the Diocese of Clifton:

- Clifton Cathedral
- Pro-Cathedral of the Holy Apostles
- St James' Priory, Bristol
- St Mary on the Quay

=== Buckinghamshire ===
In the Diocese of Northampton:

- St Bernardine's Catholic Church, Buckingham
- Church of Christ the Cornerstone (shared)
- St Peter's Church, Marlow

=== Cambridgeshire ===
In the Diocese of East Anglia:

- Buckden Towers
- Cambridge University Catholic Chaplaincy, Cambridge
- Cambridge Blackfriars
- St Laurence's Church, Cambridge
- Our Lady and the English Martyrs Church, Cambridge
- Our Lady & Saint Charles Borromeo Church, Wisbech
- Our Lady and the English Martyrs Church
- Sacred Heart Church, St Ives
- St Etheldreda's Church, Ely
- St Olga Ukrainian Catholic Church
- St Peter and All Souls, Peterborough

=== Cheshire ===
In the Diocese of Shrewsbury:

- Church of St. Cuthbert by the Forest
- St Mary's Church, Congleton
- St Mary's Church, Crewe
- Curzon Park Abbey
- Church of St Mary of the Angels, Hooton
- St Alban's Church, Macclesfield
- St Francis' Church, Chester
- St Werburgh's Church, Chester
- St Winefride's, Sandbach
- St Columba's Church, Chester

In the Archdiocese of Liverpool:

- St Michael's Church, Ditton
- St Oswald's Church, Padgate
- St Alban's Church, Warrington
- St Mary's Church, Warrington
- St Benedict's Church, Warrington
- St Bede's Church, Widnes

=== Cornwall ===
In the Diocese of Plymouth:

- St Mary Immaculate Church, Falmouth
- Glasney College
- Parish Church of St Mary and St Petroc
- Sclerder Abbey
- St Mawgan Monastery
- St Paul's Church, Tintagel
- St Thomas Becket chapel, Bodmin

=== Cumbria ===
In the Diocese of Lancaster:

- St Mary of Furness Church, Barrow-in-Furness
- Church of Holy Trinity and St George, Kendal
- Our Lady and St Joseph's Church, Carlisle
- Our Lady and St Wilfrid's Church, Warwick Bridge
- St Begh's Church, Whitehaven
- Our Lady and St Michael's Church, Workington

=== Derbyshire ===
In the Diocese of Nottingham:

- Our Lady of Sorrows Church, Bamford
- Church of All Saints, Hassop
- St Mary's Church, Derby

In the Diocese of Hallam:

- Annunciation Church, Chesterfield
- Padley Chapel
- Church of the Immaculate Conception, Spinkhill

=== Devon ===
In the Diocese of Plymouth:

- Plymouth Cathedral
- Buckfast Abbey
- Our Lady and St Nectan's Church, Hartland
- Sacred Heart Church, Exeter
- Church of the Assumption of Our Lady, Torquay
- Our Lady Help of Christians and St Denis Church, Torquay

=== Dorset ===
In the Diocese of Plymouth:

- Church of Our Lady and St Andrew, Portland
- Holy Trinity Church, Dorchester
- St Joseph's Church, Weymouth

In the Diocese of Portsmouth:

- Corpus Christi Church, Boscombe
- Church of the Annunciation, Bournemouth
- Sacred Heart Church, Bournemouth
- Our Lady Queen of Peace and Blessed Margaret Pole, Southborne

=== Durham ===
In the Diocese of Hexham and Newcastle:

- St Augustine's Church, Darlington
- St Cuthbert's Church, Durham
- St Joseph's Church, Hartlepool
- St Mary's Church, Hartlepool
- St Mary's Church, Stockton-on-Tees

=== East Sussex ===
In the Diocese of Arundel and Brighton:

- Church of St Thomas More, Seaford
- Our Lady of Ransom Church, Eastbourne
- St George's Church, Polegate
- Church of St Thomas of Canterbury and English Martyrs, St Leonards-on-Sea
- St Mary Star of the Sea Church, Hastings
- St Wilfrid's Church, Hailsham
- St Anthony of Padua Church, Rye
- St John the Evangelist Church, Heron's Ghyll
- St Mary Magdalene's Church, Bexhill-on-Sea

Brighton and Hove

- St Peter's Church, Aldrington
- St John the Baptist's Church, Brighton
- Church of the Sacred Heart, Hove
- St Joseph's Church, Brighton
- St Mary Magdalen's Church, Brighton
- St Mary's Church, Preston Park

=== Essex ===
In the Diocese of Brentwood:

- Brentwood Cathedral
- Chapel of the Immaculate Conception, Franciscan Convent
- Our Lady Queen of Peace Church, Braintree
- St James the Less and St Helen Church, Colchester
- Our Lady Help of Christians and St Helen's Church, Westcliff-on-Sea
- Our Lady Immaculate Church, Chelmsford

=== Gloucestershire ===
In the Diocese of Clifton:

- St Mary of the Angels Church, Brownshill
- St Gregory's Church, Cheltenham
- St Peter's Church, Gloucester
- Mythe Chapel
- Odda's Chapel
- Prinknash Abbey
- Convent of Poor Clares, Woodchester

=== Greater London ===
In the Archdiocese of Westminster:

- Westminster Cathedral
- Our Lady of Lourdes Church, Acton
- St Mary of the Angels Church, Bayswater
- St Casimir's Lithuanian Church, Bethnal Green
- St John the Evangelist Church, Brentford
- St John the Baptist Catholic Church, Hackney
- Brompton Oratory
- Our Lady of Dolours Church, Chelsea
- Church of Our Most Holy Redeemer and St Thomas More, Chelsea
- St Mary's Church, Cadogan Street
- Church of Our Lady of Grace & St Edward, Chiswick
- Church of Our Lady of Hal, Camden
- St Dominic's Priory Church, Camden
- Christ the King, Cockfosters
- Parafia Church, Ealing
- Ealing Abbey
- St Etheldreda's Church, Ely Place
- English Martyrs Church, Tower Hill
- St Thomas of Canterbury Church, Fulham
- St Augustine's Church, Hammersmith
- Holy Trinity Church, Brook Green
- St Andrew Bobola Church, Hammersmith
- St Francis de Sales, Hampton Hill and Upper Teddington
- St Theodore's Church, Hampton
- Our Lady Queen of Apostles Church, Heston
- St Joseph's Church, Highgate
- St John the Evangelist Church, Islington
- St Peter's Italian Church, Clerkenwell
- Our Lady of Victories Church, Kensington
- Our Lady of Perpetual Help Church, Fulham
- Church of the Immaculate Conception, Farm Street
- Mary Immaculate and St Peter Church, New Barnet
- St John's Church, North Woolwich (Shared)
- Notre Dame de France Church
- Our Lady and St Thomas of Canterbury Church, Harrow
- St Monica's Church, Palmers Green
- Our Lady of Mount Carmel and St Simon Stock, Kensington
- Sacred Heart Church, Kilburn
- St James's Church, Spanish Place
- Corpus Christi Church, Maiden Lane
- St Mary Moorfields
- St Monica's Church, Hoxton
- St Francis of Assisi Church, Notting Hill
- Church of St Mary and St Joseph, Poplar
- St Patrick's Church, Soho Square
- St Anselm's Church, Southall
- St Ignatius Church, Stamford Hill
- Sacred Heart Church, Teddington
- Church of St Mary and St Michael, Tower Hamlets
- Church of St James, Twickenham
- Church of St Margaret of Scotland, Twickenham
- Tyburn Convent
- St Joseph's Church, Wembley
- St Catherine's Church, West Drayton
- Our Lady of the Assumption and St Gregory Church, Westminster (Ordinariate)
- St Mary Magdalen Church, Whetstone
- St Boniface's German Church, Whitechapel
- St Edmund of Canterbury Church, Whitton

In the Archdiocese of Southwark:

- St George's Cathedral, Southwark
- Sacred Heart Church, Battersea
- St Edmund's Church, Beckenham
- Our Lady Help of Christians Church, Blackheath
- Corpus Christi Church, Brixton
- St Osmund's Church, Barnes
- Sacred Heart Church, Camberwell
- St Mary's Church, Chislehurst
- St Mary's Church, Clapham
- St Mary's Church, Croydon
- St Thomas More Church, Dulwich
- Our Lady of the Angels Church, Erith
- St Thomas Aquinas Church, Ham
- Our Lady of Loreto and St Winefride's Church, Kew
- St Agatha's Church, Kingston
- St Saviour's Church, Lewisham
- Good Shepherd, Downham
- St Mary Magdalen Church, Mortlake
- Polish Church of St. John the Evangelist, Putney
- Our Lady Queen of Peace Church, Richmond
- St Elizabeth of Portugal Church, Richmond
- St Joseph Church, Roehampton
- Church of the Most Precious Blood, Southwark (Ordinariate)
- Sts Simon and Jude Church, Streatham Hill
- St Raphael's Church, Surbiton
- St Anne's Church, Vauxhall
- St Patrick's Church, Waterloo
- Our Lady of Willesden Church
- Christ the King Church, Wimbledon Park
- St Winefride Church, South Wimbledon
- Sacred Heart Church, Wimbledon
- St Peter's Church, Woolwich

In the Diocese of Brentwood:

- Our Lady of Grace and St Teresa of Avila Church, Chingford
- St Nicholas' Chapel, Manor Park
- St Edward the Confessor Catholic Church, Romford
- St Francis of Assisi Church, Stratford
- Our Lady of Compassion Church, Upton Park
- Our Lady of Lourdes, Wanstead
- St Thomas of Canterbury Church, Woodford Green

Eastern Catholic:

- Ukrainian Catholic Cathedral of the Holy Family in Exile
- Church of St Cyril of Turau and All the Patron Saints of the Belarusian People

=== Greater Manchester ===
In the Diocese of Salford:

- List of parishes in the Diocese of Salford
- Salford Cathedral
- Church of the Holy Name of Jesus, Manchester
- Corpus Christi Priory, Manchester
- Gorton Monastery
- St Wilfrid's Church, Hulme
- All Saints' Church, Urmston
- St Chad's, Cheetham Hill
- Corpus Christi Priory
- Gorton Monastery
- The Hidden Gem
- Our Lady of Mount Carmel and St Patrick Church, Oldham
- St John the Baptist Church, Rochdale
- St Patrick's Church, Bolton
- St Marie's Church, Bury
- St Joseph's Church, Stockport
- Our Lady and the Apostles Church, Stockport
- St Ann's, Stretford
- St Willibrord's R C Church

In the Archdiocese of Liverpool:

- Catholic Church of St Oswald and St Edmund Arrowsmith, Ashton-in-Makerfield
- Sacred Heart Roman Catholic Church, Hindsford
- St Joseph's Roman Catholic Church, Leigh
- St John's Church, Wigan
- St Jude's Church, Wigan
- St Mary's Church, Wigan

In the Diocese of Shrewsbury

- St Paul's Church, Hyde
- Sacred Heart and St Peter's Church, Baguley
- St Aidan's Church, Northern Moor
- St Anthony's Church, Woodhouse Park
- St Hilda's Church, Northenden

Eastern Catholic:

- St Mary's Ukrainian Catholic Church, Manchester

=== Hampshire ===
In the Diocese of Portsmouth:

- Cathedral of St John the Evangelist, Portsmouth
- St Michael's Abbey, Farnborough
- St Denys Priory, Southampton
- St Joseph's Church, Aldershot
- Holy Ghost Church, Basingstoke
- St Agatha's, Landport (Ordinariate)
- St Peter's Church, Winchester
- St Edmund's Church, Southampton
- St Joseph's Church, Southampton

In the Bishopric of the Forces:

- Cathedral of St Michael and St George, Aldershot

=== Herefordshire ===
In the Archdiocese of Cardiff:

- Belmont Abbey, Herefordshire
- St Francis Xavier Church, Hereford
- Longworth Roman Catholic Chapel

=== Hertfordshire ===
In the Archiocese of Westminster:

- Benson Memorial Church
- Holy Rood Church, Watford
- Church of St Hugh of Lincoln, Letchworth
- St Alban and St Stephen's Church, St Albans

=== Isle of Wight ===
In the Diocese of Portsmouth:

- St Thomas of Canterbury Church, Newport, Isle of Wight
- Quarr Abbey
- St Cecilia's Abbey, Ryde

=== Kent ===
In the Archdiocese of Southwark:

- St Augustine's Abbey
- Aylesford Priory
- National Shrine of Saint Jude, Faversham
- Shrine of Our Lady, Bradstowe
- St Thomas of Canterbury Church, Canterbury
- St Michael the Archangel Church, Chatham
- St Mary's, Chislehurst
- St Paul's Church, Dover
- Our Lady of Gillingham Church
- St Mary's Church, Nettlestead
- St Anselm's Church, Pembury (Ordinariate)
- St Augustine's Church, Ramsgate
- St Augustine's Abbey, Ramsgate
- St Ethelbert's Church, Ramsgate
- Minster in Thanet Priory

=== Lancashire ===
In the Diocese of Lancaster:

- Lancaster Cathedral
- St Thomas & St Elizabeth Church, Thurnham
- Syro-Malabar Cathedral of St Alphonsa, Preston (Syro-Malabar)
- Church of St Thomas of Canterbury and the English Martyrs, Preston
- Church of St Walburge, Preston
- St Joseph's Church, Preston
- St Wilfrid's Church, Preston
- Sacred Heart Church, Blackpool
- Shrine of Our Lady of Lourdes, Blackpool
- Church of St Mary and St Michael, Bonds
- St Mary's Church, Fernyhalgh
- St Mary's Church, Fleetwood
- St Patrick's Chapel, Heysham
- St John the Evangelist's Church, Kirkham
- St Mary's Church, Morecambe
- Church of St John the Evangelist, Poulton-le-Fylde
- St Mary's Church, Yealand Conyers

In the Diocese of Salford:

- St Anne's Church, Blackburn
- Church of St Mary of the Assumption, Burnley
- St Michael and St John Church, Clitheroe
- Christ Church, Nelson
- Pleasington Priory
- St Peter's Church, Stonyhurst

In the Archdiocese of Liverpool:

- St Mary's Church, Leyland

=== Leicestershire ===
In the Diocese of Nottingham:

- Holy Cross Priory, Leicester, Wellington Street
- St Patrick's Catholic Church, Leicester Beaumont Leys Lane
- St Thomas More's Catholic Church, Leicester
- St Mary's Church, Loughborough
- Mount St Bernard Abbey, near Coalville
- Rothley Temple, in the village of Rothley

=== Lincolnshire ===
In the Diocese of Nottingham:

- St Mary's Church, Grantham
- Holy Rood Church, Market Rasen
- St Hugh's Church, Lincoln
- Church of St Mary and St Augustine, Stamford
- St Mary's Church, Grimsby
- St Thomas of Canterbury Church, Gainsborough
- Chapel of Our Lady and St Joseph, Osgodby
- St. Gilbert's Church, Bourne

=== Merseyside ===
In the Archdiocese of Liverpool:

- Liverpool Metropolitan Cathedral
- St Clare's Church, Liverpool
- St Peter's Roman Catholic Church, Liverpool
- Church of St Vincent de Paul, Liverpool
- St Anne's Church, Edge Hill, Liverpool
- St Francis Xavier Church, Liverpool
- St Austin's Church, Grassendale, Liverpool
- St John the Evangelist's Church, Kirkdale, Liverpool
- Church of Our Lady of Reconciliation, Liverpool
- Church of St Philip Neri, Liverpool
- St. Aloysius Catholic Church (Liverpool)
- Our Lady of Mount Carmel RC Church, Liverpool
- Our Lady of the Annunciation Church, Liverpool
- Sacred Heart Church, Liverpool
- St Anthony of Padua Church, Liverpool
- St Anthony's Church, Scotland Road, Liverpool
- St Ambrose's Church, Speke, Liverpool
- St Mary of the Angels, Liverpool
- St Oswald's Church, Old Swan, Liverpool
- St Patrick's Church, Liverpool
- St Sylvester's Church, Vauxhall, Liverpool
- St Paul's Church, West Derby, Liverpool
- St Mary's Church, Woolton, Liverpool
- St Mary's Church, Billinge
- Church of St Teresa of Avila, Birkdale
- St Joseph's Church, Birkdale
- Church of St Monica, Bootle
- Church of the Holy Family, Ince Blundell
- St Mary's Church, Presbytery and Convent, Little Crosby
- Our Lady Help of Christians Church, Portico
- Our Lady Star of the Sea, Seaforth
- Our Lady Immaculate and St Joseph Church, Prescot
- St Bartholomew's Church, Rainhill
- Church of St Mary, Lowe House, St Helens
- Holy Cross and St Helen Church, St Helens

In the Diocese of Shrewsbury:

- Church of Our Lady of the Immaculate Conception, Birkenhead
- St Werburgh's Church, Birkenhead
- St Peter and St Paul's Church, New Brighton
- St Anne's Church, Rock Ferry
- Church of Our Lady Star of the Sea, Wallasey
- English Martyrs' Church, Wallasey
- St Alban's Church, Wallasey

=== Norfolk ===
In the Diocese of East Anglia:

- St John the Baptist Cathedral, Norwich
- St Dominic, Downham Market
- Church of St Peter, Gorleston-on-Sea
- St Mary's Church, Great Yarmouth
- Our Lady of the Annunciation Church, King's Lynn
- Quidenham Hall
- Basilica of Our Lady of Walsingham

=== Northamptonshire ===
In the Diocese of Northampton:

- Northampton Cathedral
- St Martin's Catholic Church, Brackley
- Our Lady of Perpetual Succour Church, Great Billing
- Our Lady of the Sacred Heart Church, Wellingborough

=== Northumberland ===
In the Diocese of Hexham and Newcastle:

- Our Lady and St Cuthbert Church, Berwick
- Biddlestone Chapel
- St Mary's Church, Hexham
- Minsteracres
- St Robert of Newminster Church, Morpeth
- St Ninian's Catholic Church, Wooler

=== Nottinghamshire ===
In the Diocese of Nottingham:

- Nottingham Cathedral
- St Philip Neri Church, Mansfield
- Church of the Good Shepherd, Nottingham
- St John the Evangelist's Catholic Church, Nottingham

In the Diocese of Hallam:

- St Mary's Church, Worksop

Eastern Catholic:

- St Alban's Church, Sneinton (Ukrainian Catholic)

=== Oxfordshire ===
In the Archdiocese of Birmingham:

- St John the Evangelist Church, Banbury
- Holy Trinity Church, Chipping Norton
- Blackfriars, Oxford
- Oxford Oratory
- Oxford University Catholic Chaplaincy
- St Anthony of Padua, Oxford
- St Edmund and St Frideswide Church, Oxford

In the Diocese of Portsmouth:

- Our Lady and St Edmund's Church, Abingdon

=== Shropshire ===
In the Diocese of Shrewsbury:

- Shrewsbury Cathedral
- Greyfriars, Shrewsbury
- St Mary's Church, Madeley
- St Peter and Paul Church, Newport

=== Somerset ===
In the Diocese of Clifton:

- St John's Church, Bath
- Church of Our Lady & St Alphege, Bath
- Immaculate Conception Church, Clevedon
- Downside Abbey
- The Church of Our Lady St Mary of Glastonbury
- Church of the Holy Ghost, Midsomer Norton
- Roman Catholic Church of St Teresa of Lisieux, Taunton
- St George's Roman Catholic Church, Taunton
- St Joseph's Church, Weston-super-Mare

=== Staffordshire ===
In the Archdiocese of Birmingham:

- St Joseph's Church, Burslem
- St Mary and St Modwen Church, Burton-on-Trent
- St Filumena's Church, Caverswall
- St Giles' Catholic Church, Cheadle
- St Mary's Abbey, Colwich
- St Wilfrid's Church, Cotton
- St Mary's Church, Cresswell
- Sacred Heart Church, Hanley
- St Gregory's Church, Longton
- Holy Trinity Church, Newcastle-under-Lyme
- St Austin's Church, Stafford
- Our Lady of the Angels and St Peter in Chains Church, Stoke-on-Trent
- Sacred Heart Church, Tunstall
- St Mary's Catholic Church, Uttoxeter

=== Suffolk ===
In the Diocese of East Anglia:

- Mary Magdalen, Ipswich
- St Pancras Church, Ipswich
- St James, Ipswich
- St Mark, Ipswich
- St Mary, Woodbridge Road, Ipswich
- St Edmund's Church, Bury St Edmunds
- Catholic Church in Sudbury, Suffolk
- Church of Our Lady and St Peter, Aldeburgh
- Church of St Thomas of Canterbury, Woodbridge
- Clare Priory
- Coldham Cottage
- Our Lady Star of the Sea Church, Lowestoft

=== Surrey ===
In the Diocese of Arundel and Brighton:

- St Tarcisius Church, Camberley
- Sacred Heart Church, Caterham
- St Teresa of Avila Church, Chiddingfold
- St Augustine's Abbey, Chilworth
- St Joseph's Church, Dorking
- Church of Our Lady of the Assumption, Englefield Green
- St Joan of Arc's Church, Farnham
- St Edmund Church, Godalming
- Church of Our Lady and St Peter, Leatherhead
- All Saints Church, Oxted
- St Dunstan's Church, Woking

=== Tyne and Wear ===
In the Diocese of Hexham and Newcastle:

- St Mary's Cathedral, Newcastle upon Tyne
- St Joseph's Church, Gateshead
- Holy Name parish, Jesmond
- St Dominic's Church, Newcastle
- Sacred Heart Church, North Gosforth
- St Bede's Church, South Shields
- St Benet's Church, Sunderland
- St Mary's Church, Sunderland
- Our Lady and St Oswin Church, Tynemouth

=== Warwickshire ===
In the Archdiocese of Birmingham:

- St Francis of Assisi, Bedworth
- St Peter and St Paul and St Elizabeth Catholic Church, Coughton
- St Peter's Church, Leamington Spa
- Church of Our Lady, Lillington
- Our Lady of the Angels, Nuneaton
- St Anne's, Chapel End, Nuneaton
- St Marie's Church, Rugby
- St Mary Immaculate Roman Catholic Church, Warwick

=== West Sussex ===
In the Diocese of Arundel and Brighton:

- Arundel Cathedral
- Our Lady of England Priory
- St Wilfrid's Church, Burgess Hill
- English Martyrs' Catholic Church, Goring-by-Sea
- Fitzalan Chapel
- Friary Church of St Francis and St Anthony, Crawley
- Our Lady and St Peter's Church, East Grinstead
- Our Lady of Sorrows Church, Bognor Regis
- St Hugh's Charterhouse, Parkminster
- Sacred Heart Church, Petworth
- St Richard of Chichester Church, Chichester
- St Peter's Church, Shoreham-by-Sea
- Shrine Church of Our Lady of Consolation and St Francis
- St Catherine's Church, Littlehampton
- Worth Abbey
- St Mary of the Angels, Worthing

=== West Midlands ===
In the Archdiocese of Birmingham:

- St Chad's Cathedral, Birmingham
- St Michael's Catholic Church, Moor Street, Birmingham
- St Catherine of Siena Church, Birmingham
- St Edward's Church, Selly Park, Birmingham
- Erdington Abbey, Birmingham
- St Francis of Assisi Church, Handsworth, Birmingham
- St Mary's Convent, Handsworth
- St Mary's Church, Harborne, Birmingham
- Our Lady and St Brigid's Church, Northfield, Birmingham
- Birmingham Oratory, Birmingham
- Our Lady Help of Christians Church, Tile Cross, Birmingham
- St Anne's Church, Birmingham
- Church of Our Lady and St Rose of Lima, Weoley Castle, Birmingham
- St Osburg's Church, Coventry
- St Chad's Church, Sedgley
- St Augustine of England Church, Solihull
- St Mary's Church, Walsall
- Church of Our Lady and St Hubert, Warley
- St Mary and St John Church, Wolverhampton
- St Peter and St Paul's Church, Wolverhampton
- Carmelite Monastery, Wolverhampton

=== Wiltshire ===
In the Diocese of Clifton:

- St Thomas More Roman Catholic Church, Bradford-on-Avon
- St Aldhelm's Roman Catholic Church, Malmesbury
- St Osmund's Church, Salisbury
- Holy Rood Church, Swindon

=== Worcestershire ===
In the Archdiocese of Birmingham:

- Church of the Sacred Heart and St Catherine, Droitwich Spa
- Our Lady and St Alphonsus Church, Hanley Swan
- St Wulstan's Roman Catholic Church, Little Malvern
- Our Lady of Mount Carmel Church, Redditch
- St George's Church, Worcester

=== Yorkshire ===
East Riding

In the Diocese of Middlesbrough:

- St John of Beverley Church, Beverley
- Our Lady and St Peter's Church, Bridlington
- Ss Mary & Everilda, Everingham
- St Mary and St Joseph's Church, Hedon
- Sacred Heart Church, Hornsea
- Sacred Heart Church, Howden
- St Charles Borromeo, Hull
- Most Holy Sacrament Church, Marton

North Yorkshire

In the Diocese of Middlesbrough:

- Middlesbrough Cathedral
- Ampleforth Abbey
- St Mary and St Joseph's Church, Bedale
- St Mary's Church, Crathorne
- St John's Church, Easingwold
- St Hedda's Church, Egton Bridge
- St Mary's Church, Filey
- St Margaret Clitherow's Church, Great Ayton
- St Joseph's Church, Green Hammerton
- St Margaret Clitherow's Church, Haxby
- St Mary's Church, Helmsley
- St Chad's Church, Kirkbymoorside
- Our Lady of the Sacred Heart Church, Lealholm
- St Peter and St Paul's Church, Leyburn
- St Leonard & Mary, Malton
- Sacred Heart Church, Middlesbrough
- St Clare of Assisi, Middlesbrough
- St Joseph's Church, Newby
- St Bernadette's, Nunthorpe
- St Joseph's Church, Pickering
- St Joseph and St Francis Xavier Church, Richmond
- St Edward the Confessor's Church, Scarborough
- St George's Church, Scarborough
- St Peter's Church, Scarborough
- Our Lady Star of the Sea Church, Staithes
- Stanbrook Abbey
- St Joseph's Church, Stokesley
- Thicket Priory
- St Anne's Church, Ugthorpe
- St Hilda's Church, Whitby
- St Patrick's Church, Whitby
- Ss Mary and Romuald, Yarm
- Medieval parish churches of York
- The Shrine of Our Lady of Mount Grace
- Bar Convent, York
- St George's Roman Catholic Church, York
- More House, York
- Shrine of St Margaret Clitherow, York
- St Mary's Abbey, York
- St John's in the Marsh Church, York
- York Oratory

In the Diocese of Leeds:

- St Joseph's Church, Bishop Thornton
- St Mary's Catholic Church, Carlton
- St Robert's Church, Harrogate
- St Mary's Church, Knaresborough
- St Wilfrid's Church, Ripon
- Church of the Immaculate Conception, Scarthingwell
- St Mary Immaculate Church, Sicklinghall
- St Stephen's Church, Skipton
- St Margaret Clitherow's Church, Threshfield

South Yorkshire

In the Roman Catholic Diocese of Hallam:

- Cathedral Church of St Marie, Sheffield
- Monastery of The Holy Spirit, Sheffield
- Sacred Heart Church, Hillsborough, Sheffield
- St Vincent's Church, Sheffield
- Holy Rood Church, Barnsley
- Our Lady of Doncaster
- St Bede's Church, Rotherham
- St Joseph's Church, Handsworth
- St Theresa's Church, Sheffield

West Yorkshire

In the Diocese of Leeds:

- Leeds Cathedral
- Kirkstall Abbey, Leeds
- Mount St Mary's Church, Leeds
- Our Lady of Lourdes Church, Leeds
- St Patrick's Church, Leeds
- St Edward King and Confessor Catholic Church, Clifford
- St Mary's Church, Halifax
- St Patrick's Church, Bradford
- St Patrick's Church, Huddersfield
- St Austin's Church, Wakefield
- St Joseph's Church, Wetherby

== Scotland ==
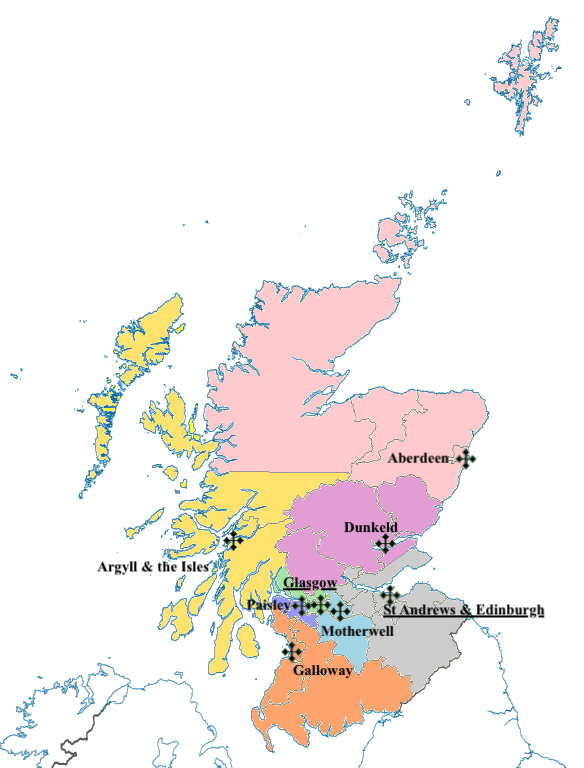
Map of Catholic dioceses in Scotland

Sorted according the regions of Scotland, although there are two ecclesiastical provinces: Archdiocese of St Andrews and Edinburgh and the Archdiocese of Glasgow:

=== Central ===
In the Archdiocese of St Andrews and Edinburgh:

- St Mary's Church, Stirling

=== Fife ===
In the Archdiocese of St Andrews and Edinburgh:

- St James Church, St Andrews
- University of St Andrews Catholic Chaplaincy

=== Grampian ===
In the Diocese of Aberdeen:

- St Mary's Cathedral, Aberdeen
- St Peter's Church, Buckie
- St Thomas's Church, Keith
- St Gregory's Church, Preshome
- St Ninian's Church, Tynet
- Pluscarden Abbey (Benedictine)
- Greyfriars Sisters of Mercy Convent in Elgin (Dominicans)

=== Highlands ===
In the Diocese of Aberdeen:

- St Mary's Church, Inverness

In the Diocese of Argyll and the Isles

- Cille Choirill

=== Lothian ===
In the Archdiocese of St Andrews and Edinburgh:

- St David's Church, Dalkeith
- St Michael's Church, Linlithgow
- Sancta Maria Abbey, Nunraw (Trappists)

==== City of Edinburgh ====
- St Mary's Cathedral, Edinburgh
- Gillis Centre
- Sacred Heart, Edinburgh
- St Albert's Catholic Chaplaincy, Edinburgh
- St Columba's Catholic Church, Edinburgh
- St Ninian and Triduana's Church, Edinburgh
- St Patrick's Church, Edinburgh
- St Peter's Church, Edinburgh
- St John the Evangelist Church, Portobello
- St Joseph's Church, Edinburgh
- St Mary's Star of the Sea Church, Leith
- St Andrew's Ukrainian Catholic Church (Eparchy of the Holy Family)

=== Orkney ===
In the Diocese of Aberdeen:

- Italian Chapel

=== Strathclyde ===
In the Diocese of Argyll and the Isles:

- St Columba's Cathedral, Oban
- Craig Lodge Community

In the Diocese of Galloway:

- Ayr Cathedral
- Good Shepherd Cathedral, Ayr
- Church of St John, Cumnock

==== Greater Glasgow ====
In the Archdiocese of Glasgow:

- St Andrew's Cathedral, Glasgow
- Blessed John Duns Scotus Church, Glasgow
- Saint Mary's, Calton
- Our Lady of Good Counsel Church, Glasgow
- Sacred Heart Church, Glasgow
- St Aloysius Church, Glasgow
- St Anne's Church, Glasgow
- St Columba's Catholic Church, Glasgow
- St Mungo's Church, Glasgow

In the Diocese of Motherwell:

- Motherwell Cathedral
- Carfin Grotto
- St Bride's Church, East Kilbride
- St Mary's Church, Lanark
- St Ignatius Church, Wishaw

In the Diocese of Paisley:

- St Mirin's Cathedral

=== Tayside ===
In the Diocese of Dunkeld:

- St Andrew's Cathedral, Dundee
- Church of the Holy Family, Dunblane
- St Mary, Our Lady of Victories Church, Dundee
- St John the Baptist Church, Perth
- St Mary's Monastery, Kinnoull (Redemptorists)

=== Western Isles ===
In the Diocese of Argyll and the Isles:

- St Michael's Church, Eriskay

== Wales ==
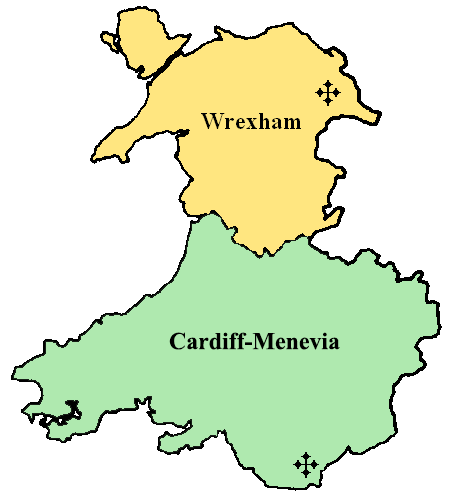
Map of the dioceses in Wales and of Herefordshire in England.

Sorted according to the preserved counties of Wales, although all of Wales is in the ecclesiastical province of Cardiff:

=== Anglesey ===
In the Diocese of Wrexham:

- Our Lady Star of the Sea and St Winefride, Amlwch
- St Mary's Church, Holyhead

=== Clwyd ===
In the Diocese of Wrexham:

- Wrexham Cathedral
- St Joseph's Church, Colwyn Bay
- St Winefride's Church, Holywell
- St David's Church, Pantasaph
- Our Lady of the Assumption Church, Rhyl
- St Beuno's Jesuit Spirituality Centre

=== Dyfed ===
In the Archdiocese of Cardiff-Menevia:

- Our Lady of Cardigan
- Caldey Abbey
- Chapel of St Non
- Our Lady Queen of Peace Church, Llanelli

=== Gwent ===
In the Archdiocese of Cardiff-Menevia:

- Church of Our Lady and St Michael, Abergavenny
- Church of St Mary and St Michael, Llanarth
- St Mary's Church, Monmouth
- St Patrick's Church, Newport
- St Michael's Church, Pillgwenlly
- St David Lewis and St Francis Xavier Church, Usk

=== Gwynedd ===
In the Diocese of Wrexham:

- Our Lady and St James Church, Bangor
- St Tudwal's Church, Barmouth
- Our Lady of Seven Sorrows Church, Dolgellau

=== Mid Glamorgan ===
In the Archdiocese of Cardiff-Menevia:

- Our Lady of Penrhys
- St Dyfrig's Church, Treforest

=== Powys ===
In the Archdiocese of Cardiff-Menevia:

- Our Lady of Ransom and the Holy Souls Church, Llandrindod Wells

=== South Glamorgan ===
In the Archdiocese of Cardiff-Menevia:

- Cardiff Metropolitan Cathedral
- Church of Our Lady and St Michael, Abergavenny
- St Alban-on-the-Moors Church, Cardiff
- St Joseph's Church, Cardiff
- St Mary of the Angels Church, Cardiff
- St Patrick's Church, Cardiff
- St Peter's Church, Cardiff
- Church of St Mary and St Michael, Llanarth
- St Mary's Church, Monmouth
- St Patrick's Church, Newport
- Our Lady of Penrhys
- St Michael's Church, Pillgwenlly
- St David Lewis and St Francis Xavier Church, Usk

=== West Glamorgan ===
In the Archdiocese of Cardiff-Menevia:

- St Joseph's Cathedral, Swansea
- St Joseph's Church, Port Talbot
- St David's Priory Church, Swansea

== Northern Ireland ==
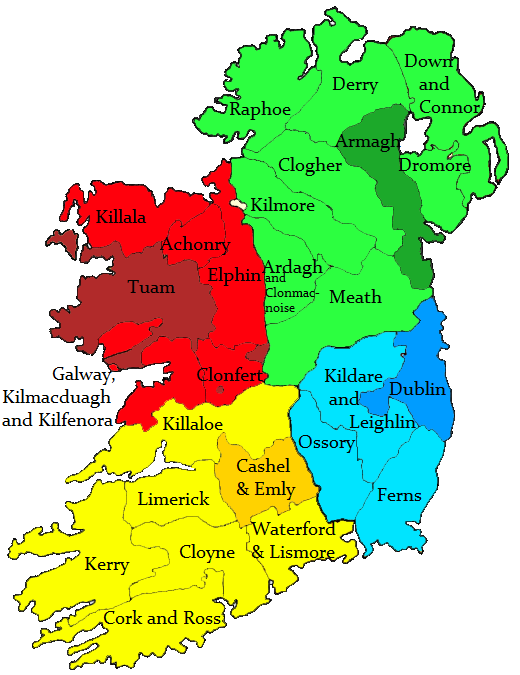
Catholic dioceses of Ireland

Sorted according to the counties of Northern Ireland, although there are also the Catholic dioceses in the ecclesiastical province of Armagh that also cover Northern Ireland: Armagh, Clogher, Derry, Down and Connor, Dromore, Kilmore.

=== Antrim ===
Belfast

In the Diocese of Down and Connor:

- St Peter's Cathedral, Belfast
- Holy Cross Church, Ardoyne
- Clonard Monastery
- St Malachy's Church, Belfast
- St Mary's Church, Belfast
- St Patrick's Church, Belfast
- St Colmcilles, Belfast

=== Armagh ===
In the Archdiocese of Armagh:

- St Patrick's Cathedral, Armagh

=== Derry ===
In the Diocese of Derry:

- St Eugene's Cathedral
- St Columba's Church, Long Tower
- St. Mary's Church, Bellaghy

=== Down ===
In the Diocese of Dromore:

- Newry Cathedral

=== Fermanagh ===
In the Diocese of Clogher:

- St. Mary's Chapel, Maguiresbridge

=== Tyrone ===
In the Diocese of Derry:

- Sacred Heart Church, Plumbridge

== See also ==
- List of cathedrals in the United Kingdom (covers Roman Catholic and Anglican and/or other denomination's cathedrals)
- List of Catholic churches in Ireland
- List of Roman Catholic churches in Leicester
- Parishes of the Eparchy of Holy Family of London for Ukrainians
