= The Mythe =

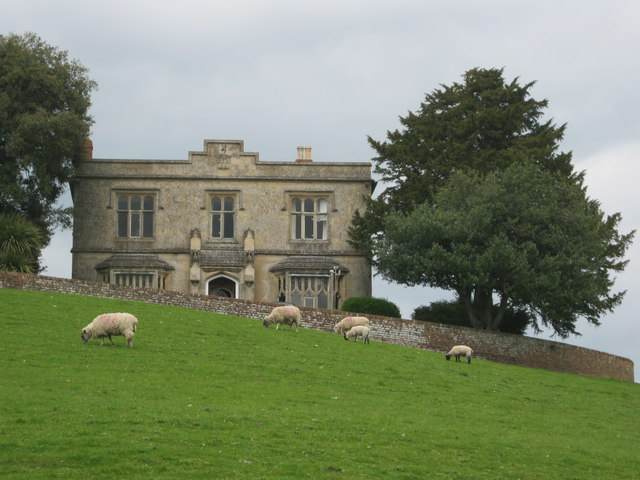

- Location in Gloucestershire
- 52°0′12.942″N 02°09′33.656″W
- Location: Tewkesbury, Gloucestershire, England

The Mythe is a house built on the top of a hill overlooking the town of Tewkesbury, England. There has been a house on the site for nearly a thousand years. The Mythe is the name of the house but it also the name of the surrounding area, about 4 square miles (10 km^{2}), which includes Mythe Chapel. The main road going through it is the A38 or the "Mythe Road". "Mythe" in Old English means the joining of two rivers.

The house now standing on the plot is an early Georgian house that was built in 1753. This house was later bought by the Marquis de Lis. When he bought it he had a Gothic facade put on the front and the sides of the building. He later added a servants' quarters on the back.

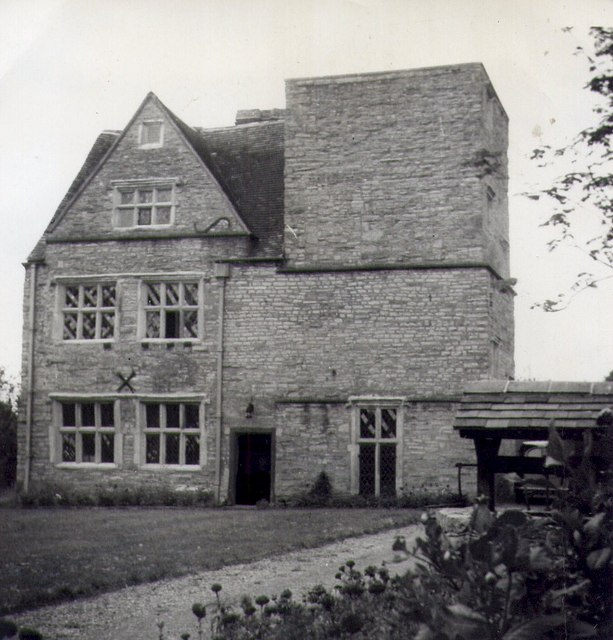
King John's Castle

King John's Castle is the surviving fragment of an earlier house, comprising a medieval former staircase tower adjoining a Tudor building. There is no firm evidence for a castle on the site.

On the south wall of the church of Studley St Mary, Warwickshire is the following: Sir Francis Lyttelton Holyoake-Goodricke died at Malvern Wells 29 December 1865 aged 68, buried Studley. Elizabeth Martha widow of above died 17 July 1888, The Mythe Tewkesbury. George Goodricke youngest son of above died 11 July 1888 aged 43 at The Mythe.

The Mythe is now a sheep and arable farm that has also diversified into events.

In Frome, Somerset there is a Victorian gothic house called Mythe House which is a house on the top of a hill too (Butts Hill) the house overlooks the town of Frome. The house was built in the 1700s and the name 'Mythe House' is carved in stone on the front of the house.

There is The Mythe located in the Parish of Sheepy on the Warwickshire and Leicestershire border. At The Mythe where the rivers Sence and Anker join there is an area marked on the map as "King Dicks Hole" reputedly where King Richard III watered his horses before the Battle of Bosworth Field. According to some historians including Michael K Jones who wrote the book "Psychology of a Battle - Bosworth 1485" The Battle of Bosworth actually took place around Atherstone with Henry Tudor camping at Merevale Hall and Richard III camping at "The Mythe" where a farm is now situated.
