= St Chad's Church, Sedgley =

Parish church of Sedgley, West Midlands County, England

St Chad Church, Sedgley
- St Chad and All Saints Church, Sedgley
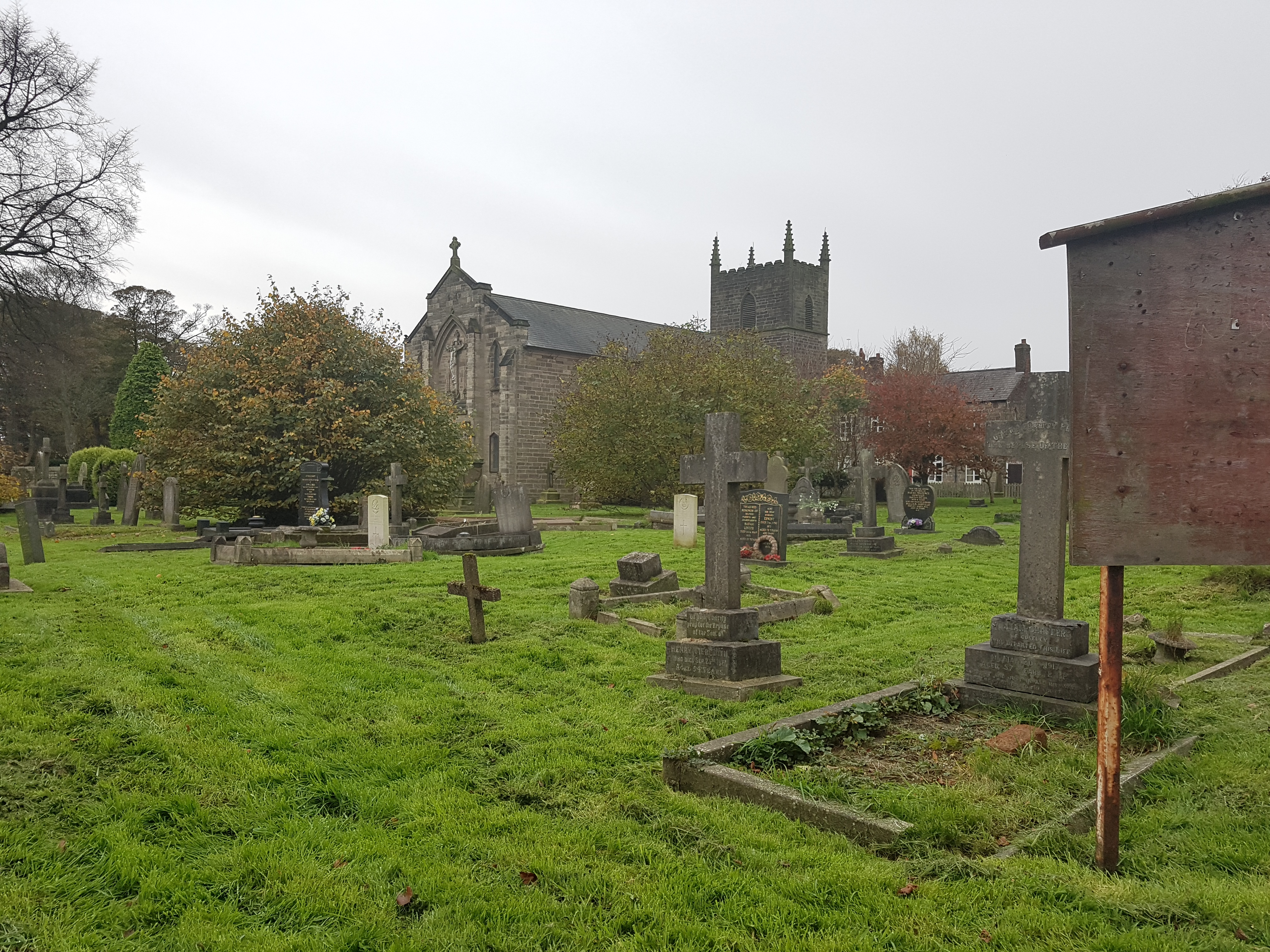
- St Chad and All Saints Church, Sedgley
- St Chad Church, Sedgley
- 52.537898°N 2.119804°W
- Location: Sedgley, Metropolitan Borough of Dudley, West Midlands County
- Country: England
- Denomination: Roman Catholic
- Website: www.rcsedgley.com

History
- Status: Roman Catholic Church
- Dedication: St Chad and All Saints
- Dedicated: 1837
- Consecrated: 1837

Architecture
- Functional status: Active
- Heritage designation: Grade II
- Designated: April 1976
- Completed: 1837

Administration
- Province: Canterbury
- Archdeaconry: Birmingham
- Deanery: Rev Father Paul Edwards, PP

St Chad's Church, also referred to as St Chad and All Saints Church or simply St Chad Church, is a Roman Catholic Church in the town of Sedgley in the Metropolitan Borough of Dudley in the West Midlands County of England. It is located to the southeast of the town between Catholic Lane and Dudley Road. It is a Grade II listed building.

== History ==
The church was built around 1837 with an attached school house and was built to serve the local catholic population of the then-village of Sedgley. It was given Grade II listed status in April 1976 by Historic England.

== Present day ==
The church serves as a local landmark and place of worship and community gatherings.
