= Our Lady of Mount Carmel Roman Catholic Church, Liverpool =

Coordinates: 53.386°N 2.964°W

Our Lady of Mount Carmel Roman Catholic Church
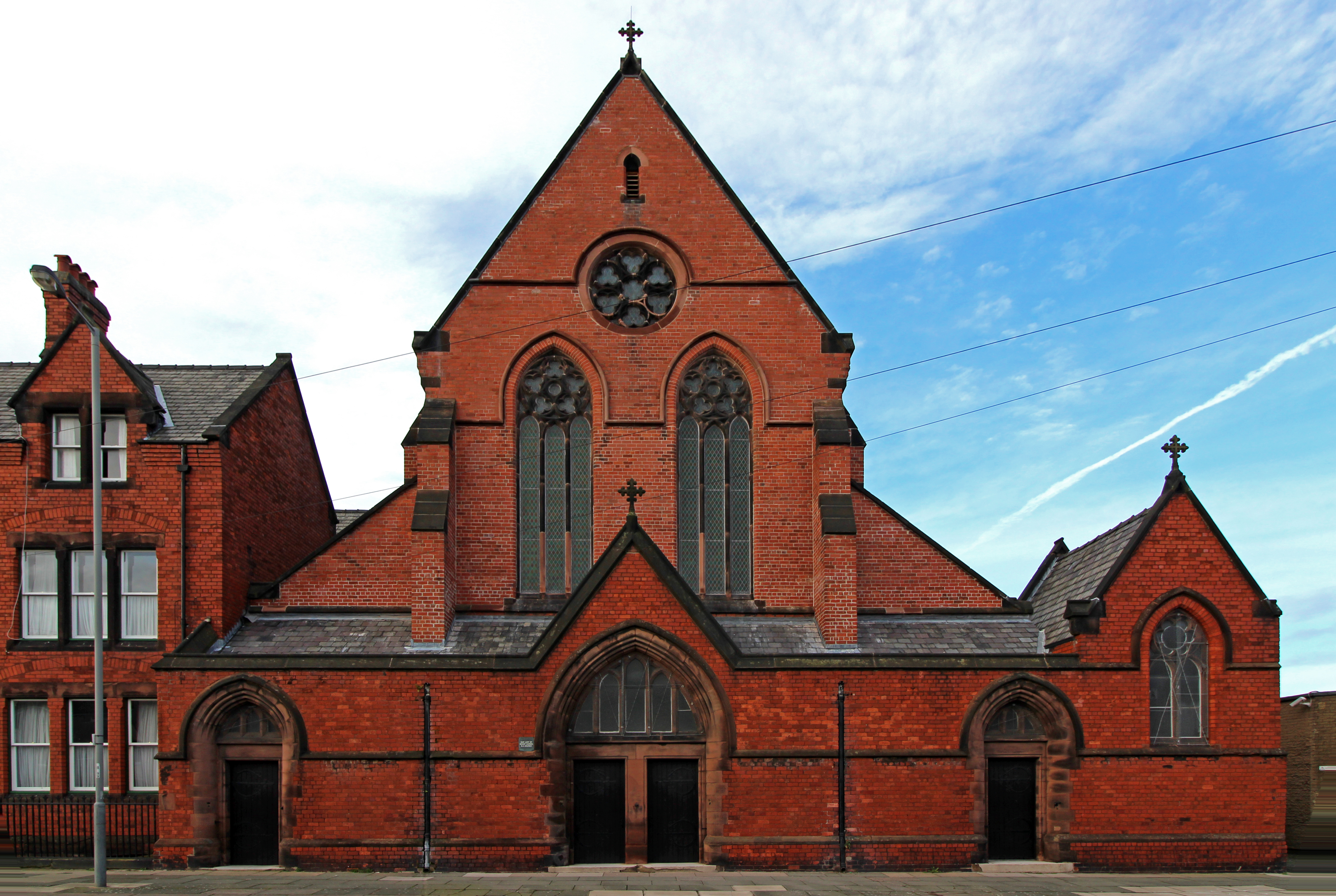
- Our Lady of Mount Carmel Roman Catholic Church
- Location: 27 High Park Street, Toxteth, Liverpool
- Country: England
- Denomination: Roman Catholic

History
- Founded: 1878
- Dedicated: July 21, 1878

Architecture
- Architect: James O'Byrne

Administration
- Diocese: Roman Catholic Archdiocese of Liverpool

Our Lady of Mount Carmel is a Roman Catholic Church on High Park Street in Dingle, Liverpool. The church was built when the parish population had outgrown the nearby Church of St Patrick on Park Place. Initially, from 1866, a chapel dedicated to Our Lady of Mount Carmel was used in the school. The church proper opened on 21 July 1878.

In December 2009 the church and the adjoining presbytery gained Grade II listed status.

In 2001, the parish of Our Lady of Mount Carmel incorporated the nearby parish of St Finbar. The latter church had closed and was later demolished in 2003.

== Images ==
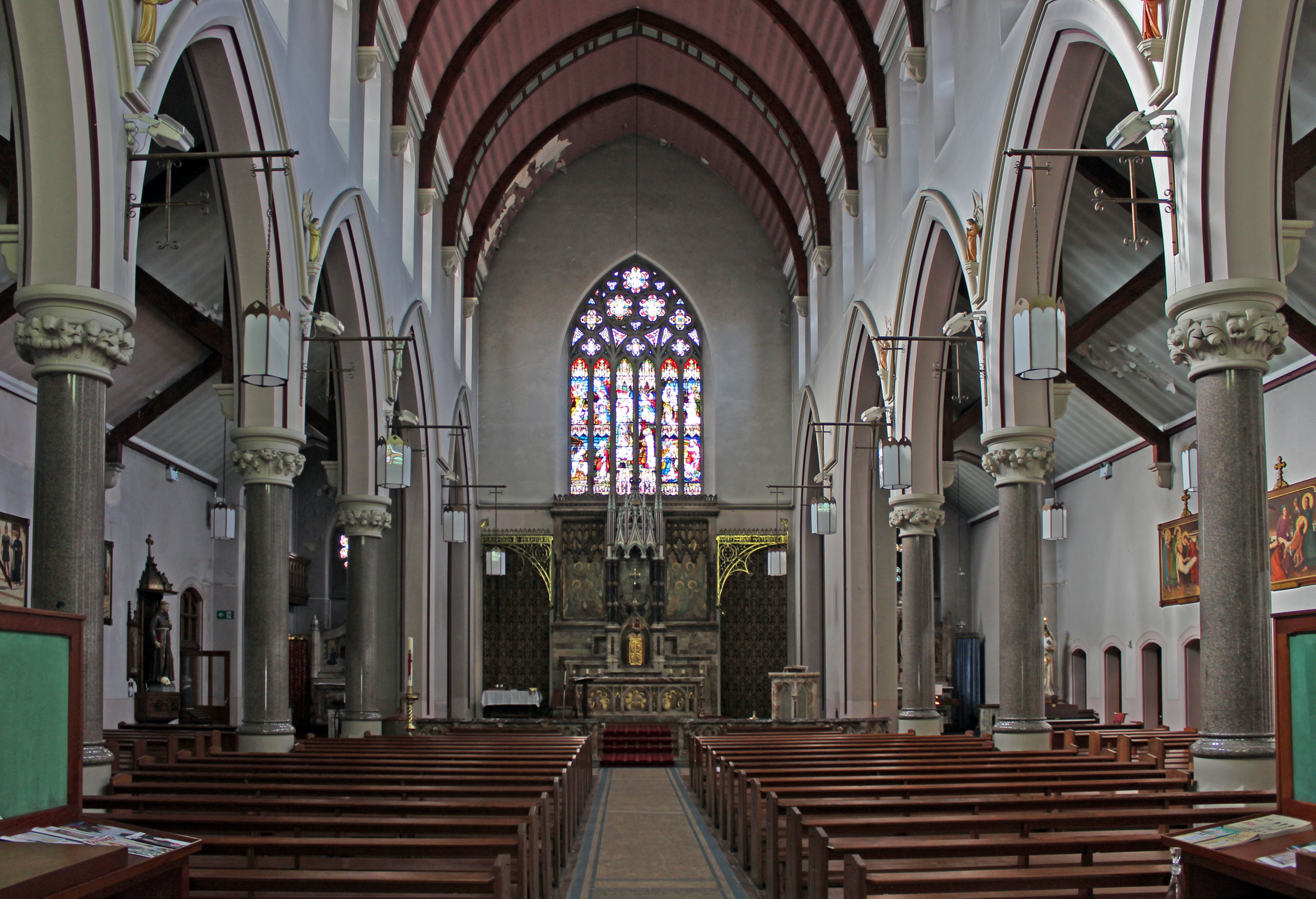
Looking towards the sanctuary

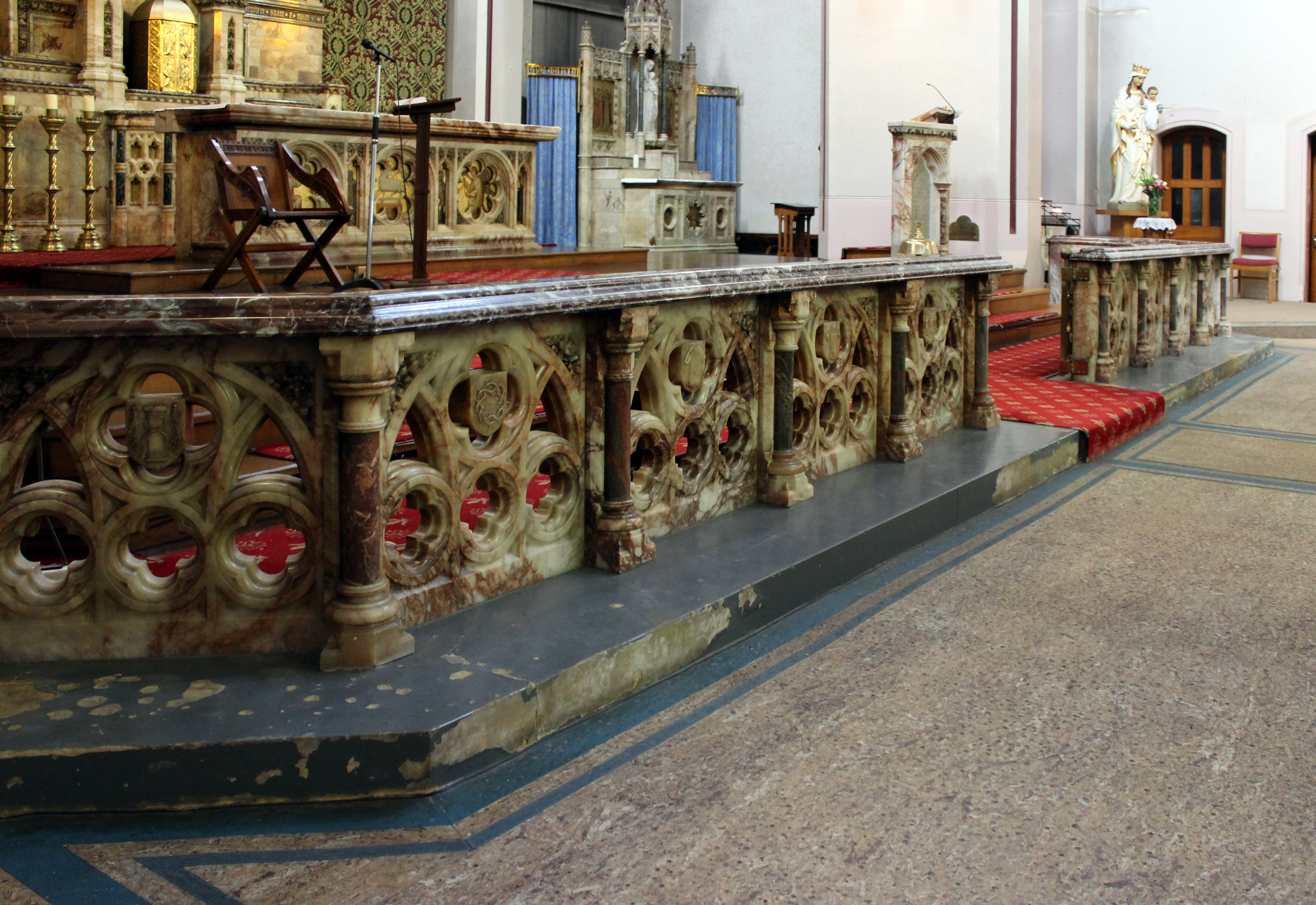
Ornate marble & alabaster altar rail

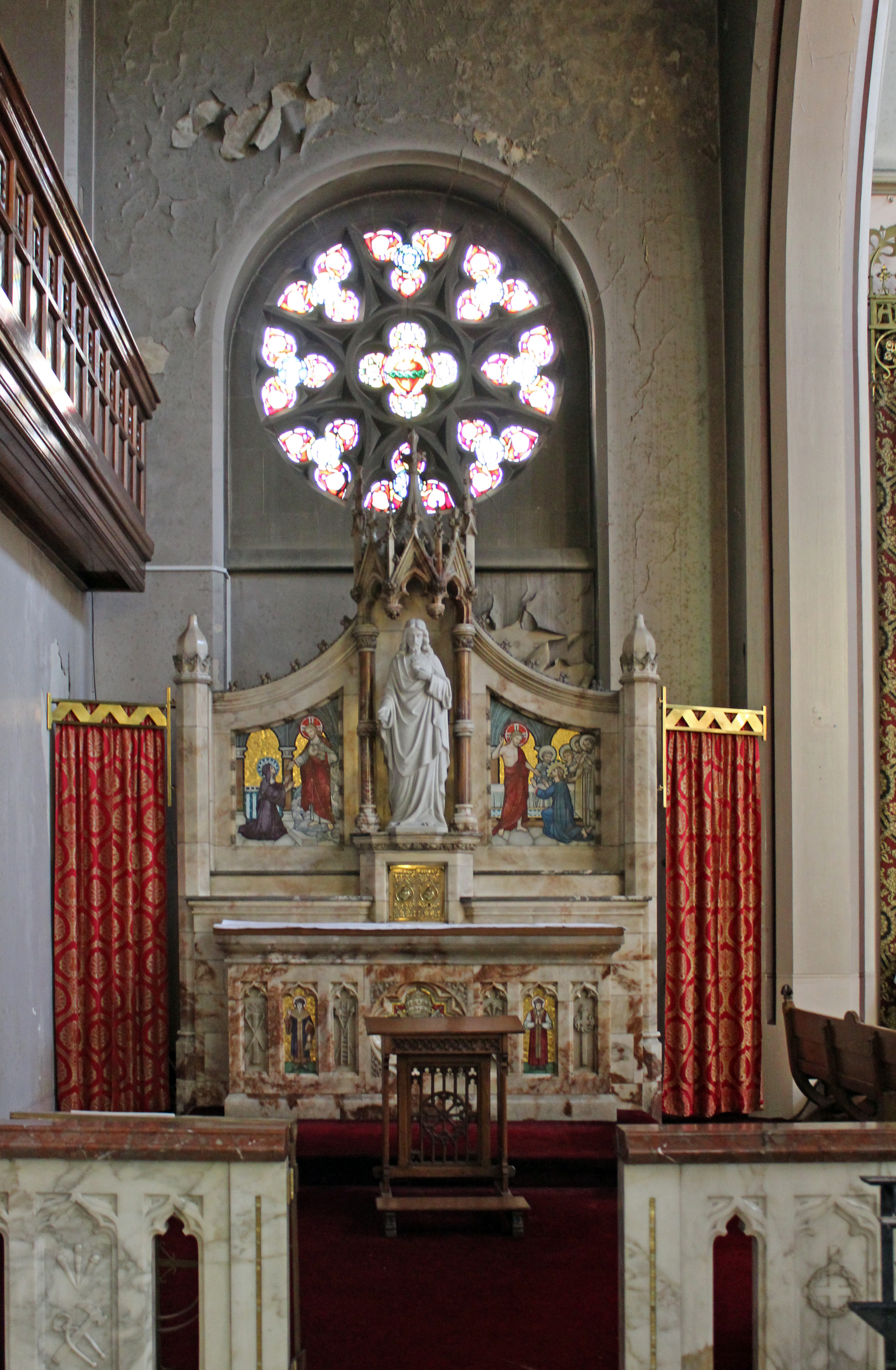
Sacred Heart chapel

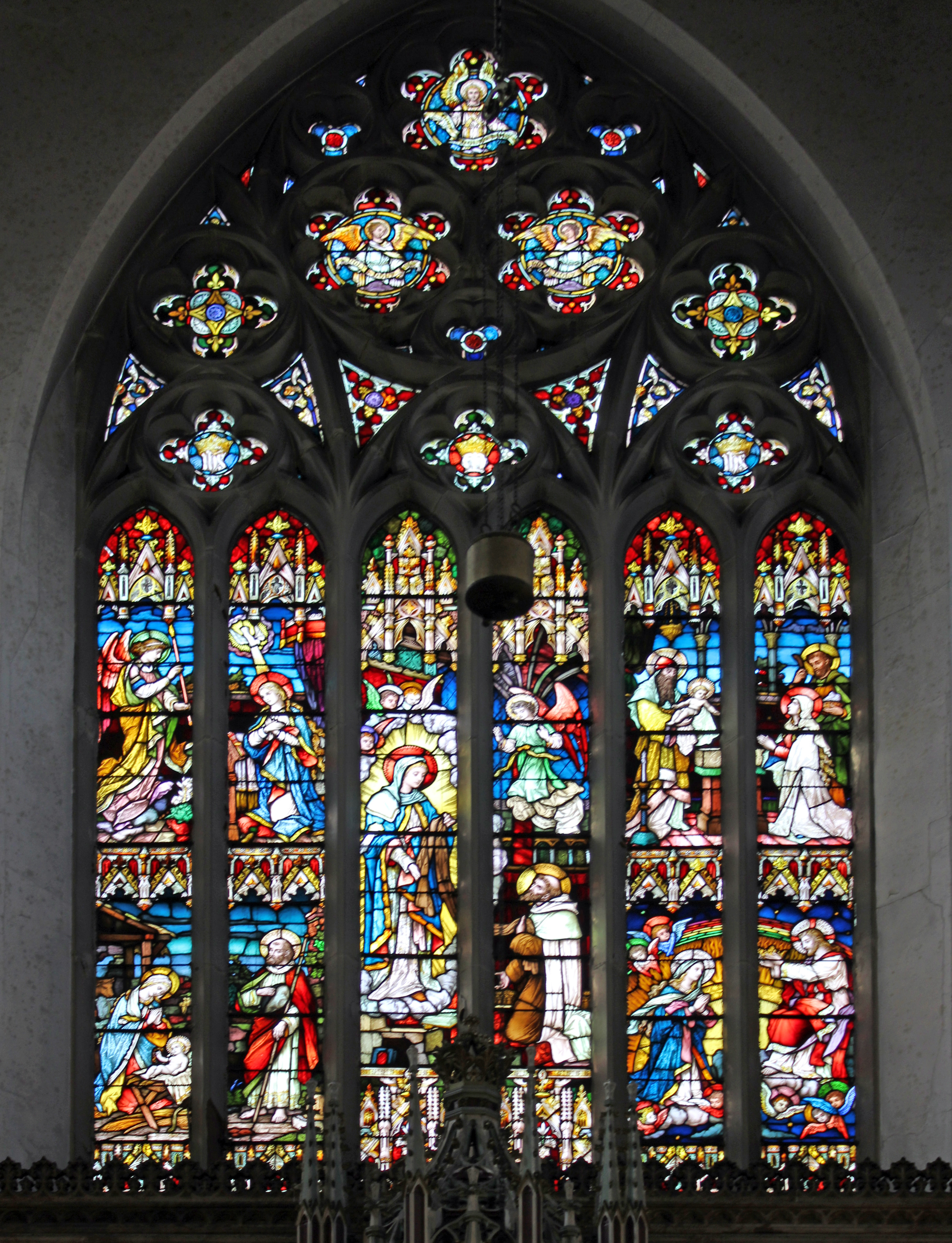
East window above the altar
