= St Joseph's Church, Wembley =

Coordinates: 51.5529°N 0.2873°W

St Joseph's Church
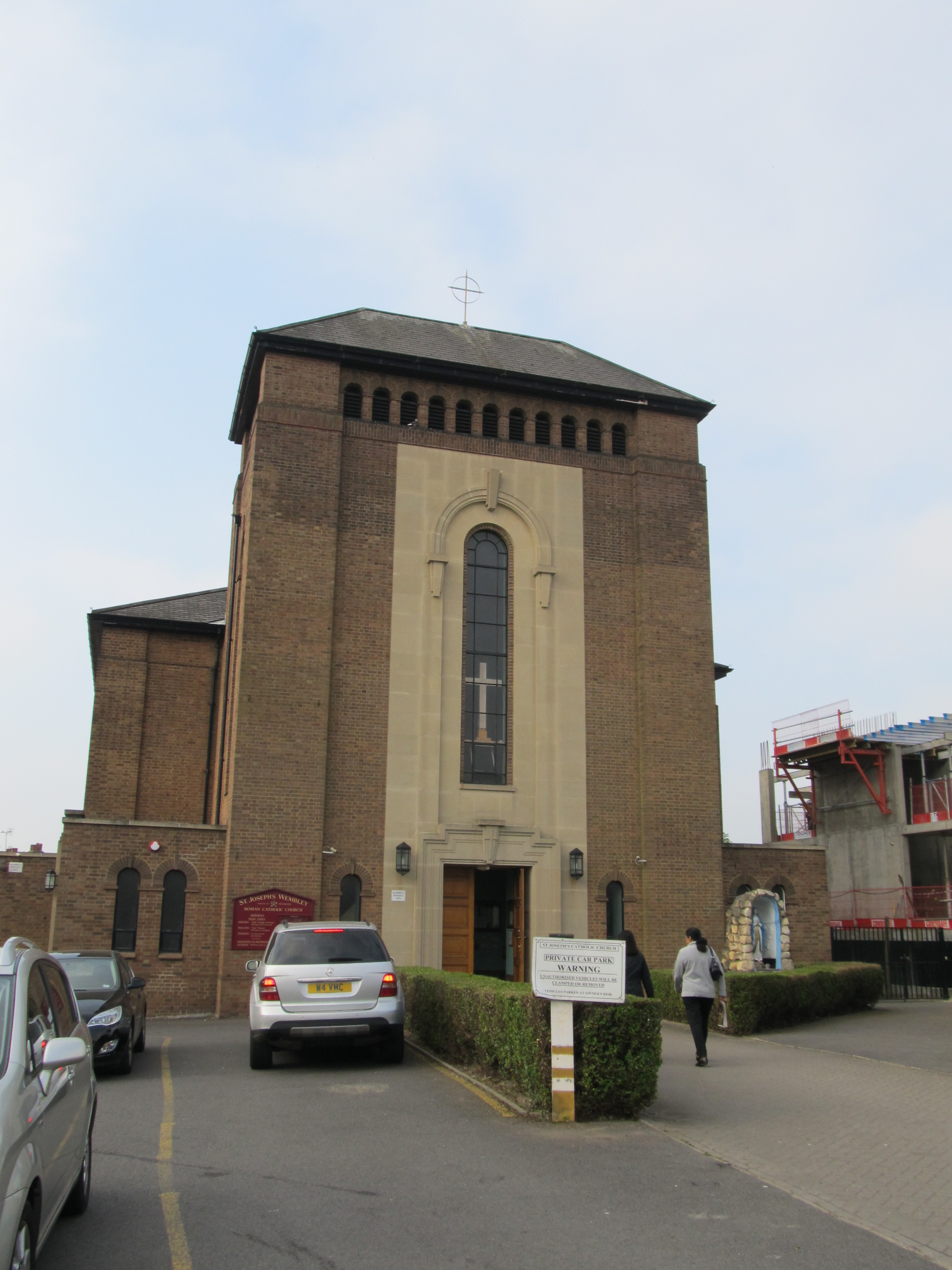
- St Joseph's Church
- OS grid reference: TQ 18839 85171
- Location: Wembley
- Country: England
- Denomination: Catholic
- Website: Official website

History
- Status: Parish church
- Dedication: Saint Joseph

Architecture
- Functional status: Active
- Heritage designation: Grade II listed
- Designated: 4 November 2016
- Architect(s): Reynolds and Scott
- Style: Romanesque Revival
- Groundbreaking: 1955
- Completed: December 1957

Administration
- Province: Westminster
- Archdiocese: Westminster
- Deanery: Brent
- Parish: Wembley

St Joseph's Church is a Catholic parish church in Wembley, Borough of Brent, London. It was built in 1957 in a modern form of Romanesque Revival architecture that also borrows from Neo-Byzantine architecture. It was designed by the architectural firm of Reynolds and Scott. They were one of the most prolific post-World War II architects in the UK. It is situated facing the junction of High Road Wembley, Harrow Road and Wembley Hill Road, in the centre of Wembley. On 4 November 2016, it was designated a Grade II listed building.

== History ==
=== Foundation ===
During the 19th century, Catholics in Wembley had to travel to Harlesden to go to Mass. In 1901, a chapel for a convent from Harley Place in Marylebone was dismantled and then reassembled in Wembley Green. It was originally meant to be a cemetery chapel for a Catholic graveyard to the south of the current church, but most of the land for the graveyard was sold off and the building became the chapel for the Catholics in the area. In 1911, it became the Catholic parish church for Wembley. It was small redbrick building, dedicated to St Joseph. In 1918, it was recorded that there were only 120 Catholics in Wembley. However, by the early 1950s, it was recorded that there were 1,650 people, mostly Irish families who had moved from nearby Willesden.

=== Construction ===
With such a growing Catholic population, a new larger church was needed to accommodate them. In 1955, construction work began on a larger church to replace the small one. The architects were Francis Maurice Reynolds and William Scott who founded their firm Reynolds & Scott in 1947. They designed over fifty churches in England in the post-World War II reconstruction. They used modern materials and techniques to build churches in Romanesque, Byzantine and Gothic styles. In December 1957, the church was opened. The church's capacity was 680 people. However, the cost of the church was quite large and took 19 years to pay off. Therefore, in 1976, the church was consecrated. Cardinal Basil Hume, Archbishop of Westminster, presided at the ceremony. After 1965, changes were made to the interior of the church with a stone altar installed at the front of the sanctuary.

== Parish ==
Next to the church, to the south is St Joseph's Junior School. The church has five Sunday Masses at 6:30 pm on Saturday and at 9:00 am, 10:45 am, 12:30 pm and 7:30 pm on Sunday.

== See also ==
- Archdiocese of Westminster
