= St Joseph's Church, Edinburgh =

Coordinates: 55.92912°N 3.28101°W

St Joseph's Church
- St Joseph's Roman Catholic Church, Sighthill
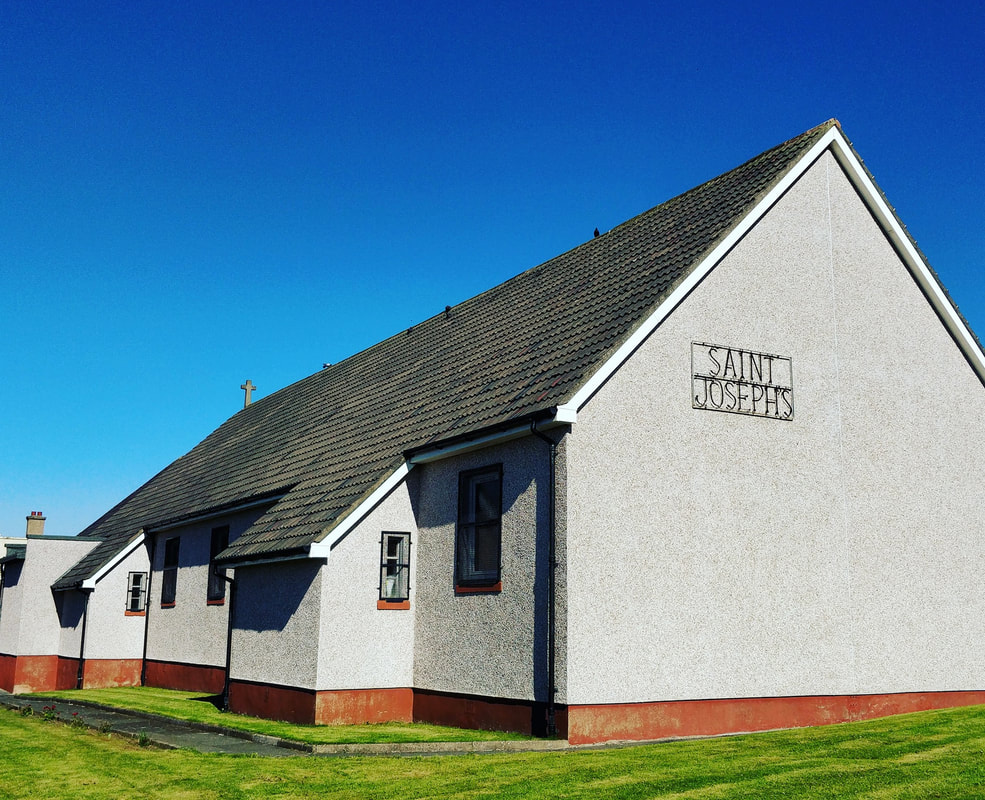
- St Joseph's Church
- Location: Broomhouse, Edinburgh
- Denomination: Roman Catholic
- Website: http://www.stjosephsbroomhouse.org.uk/

History
- Founded: Easter Sunday 1950 (built 1953)
- Dedication: Saint Joseph

Administration
- Archdiocese: St Andrews and Edinburgh
- Deanery: St Giles' City of Edinburgh

Clergy
- Archbishop: Leo Cushley

St Joseph's Church, Sighthill, (also known as St Joseph's Broomhouse), is a Roman Catholic church situated in Broomhouse, in the west of Edinburgh, Scotland. The parish boundary extends to Broomhouse, Parkhead, Saughton, Sighthill, Gorgie and further.

== History ==
=== Establishment ===
After the restoration of the Scottish Catholic hierarchy in March 1878, there were only five parishes serving the City of Edinburgh; St Mary's Cathedral, St Patrick's Cowgate, Sacred Heart Lauriston, St John the Evangelist in Portobello and St Mary Star of the Sea in Leith.

By the end of the 19th century, Edinburgh had begun to expand, and St Cuthbert's, Slateford was opened for worship in 1889. For the first quarter of the 20th century, it served the West side of the city. However, Edinburgh continued to expand, and Catholics began to complain about the distance they had to walk to get to Mass (in the days before regular public transport or mass car ownership). As such, it was agreed that a new church would be built even further west than St Cuthberts, beyond Longstone.

Wartime temporarily halted plans for the construction of a new church, in the meantime, Mass was celebrated at Murrayburn Primary School. Four curates from St Cuthbert's celebrated on a rota basis from 1942 to 1950.

Originally it was planned to build the new church on the corner of Parkhead and Calder Road, but this plan was rescinded. After much debate, construction of a new church began at the present site in Broomhouse. The parish was dedicated to Saint Joseph and officially opened for worship on Easter Sunday 1950. The church building and the priory were completed in 1953. The first Parish Priest, Fr Peter Higgins was appointed in 1953, coming from St Ninian's, where he had been a curate. The current church was meant to be a "temporary construction" (originally envisioned as the church hall), and post wartime a purpose-built church would be designed once resources were more plentiful. These plans never came to fruition, although building work did take place around the church in the form of a wall and an extension to the Priory to allow for visitors.

St John Ogilvie's Parish was opened in 1970 to serve Wester Hailes, and thus the parish boundary for St Joseph's changed in 1977. The Calders became part of the newly established St John Ogilvie's, while St Joseph's took on Stenhouse, switching from St Cuthbert's.

=== Augustinian era ===
Fr Andrew Forrest, the final Diocesan Parish Priest, relocated to Bo'ness in 1995. In 1994, the Order of Saint Augustine had withdrawn from their two parishes in Currie (Our Lady, Mother of the Church) and Balerno (St Joseph's), and instead decided to take on the administration of St Joseph's in Broomhouse. The first Augustinians arrived in Broomhouse in January 1995, and Fr Kevin Lowry OSA was appointed Parish Priest. By October 1995 changes were made and a new Augustinian community arrived in Broomhouse. Father John Reid OSA was appointed parish priest, and remained until September 2009. His tenure of 14 years at the helm makes him the longest serving Augustinian parish priest and second longest overall, behind Fr Joseph McCabe.

In 2000, the parish celebrated its Golden Jubilee, with the construction of a commemorative stained glass window at the back of the church. This was donated by St David's Church, Broomhouse, in celebration of continued ecumenism and co-operation between the two neighbouring churches, despite theological differences. Further celebration took place in 2001, when for the first time in many years, and only the second time in the Parish's history, an ordination to the priesthood took place in the church. Br Stefan Park OSA completed his studies under the mentorship of Fr John, and chose St Joseph's as the location for his ordination.

A new hall was constructed in 2005, as compensation for some of the church land being used for a new housing development. This resulted in a complete renovation of the outside of the church, and a new entrance door and front porch being added. In 2016, the parish hosted the University of Notre Dame Folk Choir for one week during their tour of Scotland and Ireland. The visit was co-ordinated by St Joseph's, and culminated in a concert by the choir in St Joseph's Church. After Fr John moved to Birmingham in 2009, a new Augustinian community arrived in Broomhouse, causing a short period of instability within the parish. 5 different Parish Priests were appointed, each for short terms, over a period of 9 years. In 2020, the Augustinians left the parish, handing it over to the Society of Saint Paul.

== Archdiocesan Restructuring ==
In 2017, the parishes of the Archdiocese of St Andrews and Edinburgh were placed into "clusters" to better share and pool their resources. St Joseph's is one of 4 parishes in Cluster 7 of the St Giles' Deanery, along with St Cuthberts, St John Ogilvie's and Our Lady Mother of the Church, Currie.

It is planned that in the near future, the parishes of St Joseph's, Broomhouse and St John Ogilvie's, Wester Hailes, will be merged to form one parish, although the 2 church buildings will remain open for worship.

== See also ==
- Roman Catholic Archdiocese of St Andrews and Edinburgh
- Augustinian Province of England and Scotland
