= St Mary's, Inverness =

- St Mary's Roman Catholic Church
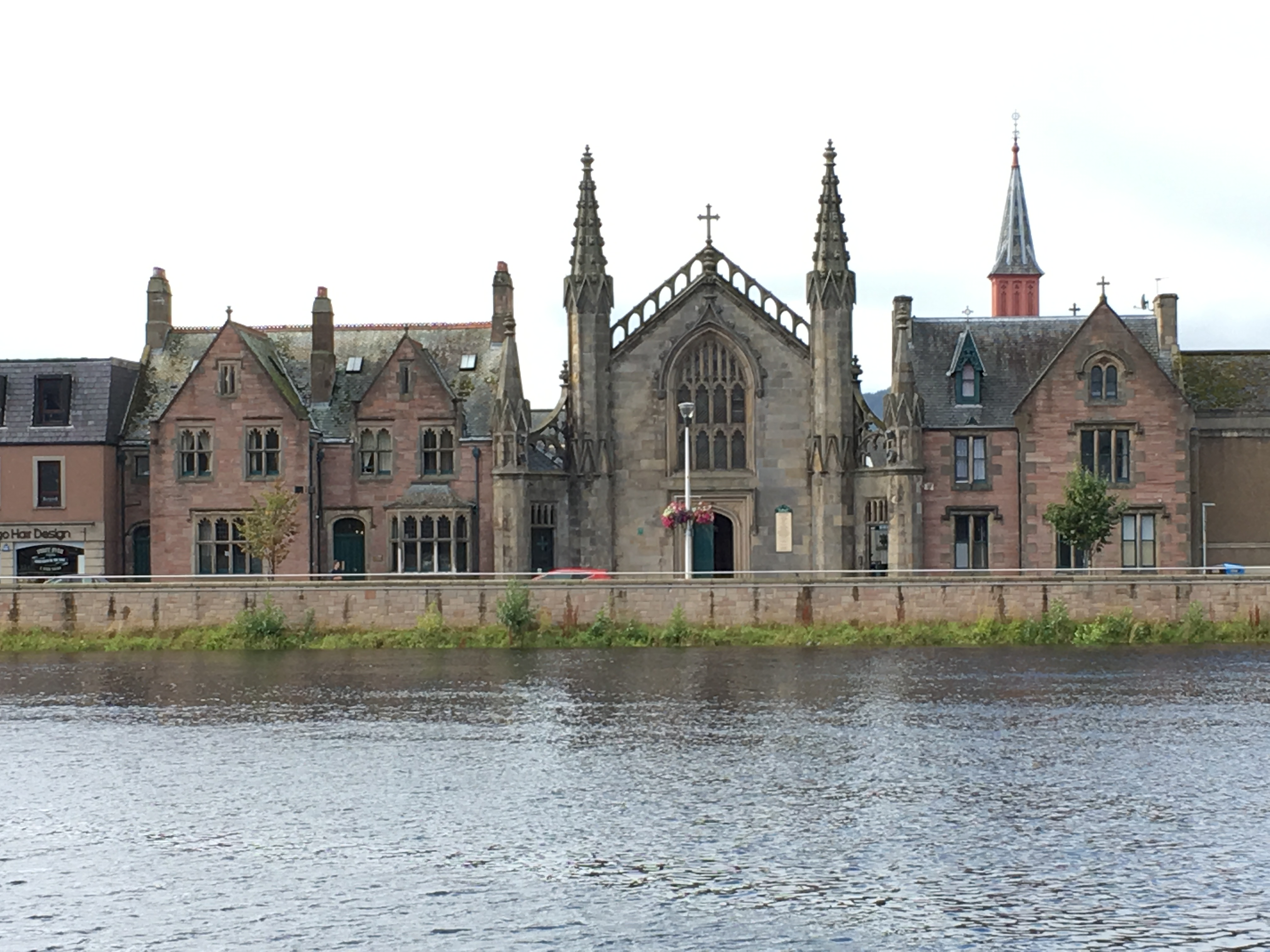
- St Mary's, Inverness
- 57°28′41″N 4°13′48″W
- Location: Inverness, Inverness-Shire
- Country: Scotland
- Denomination: Roman Catholic
- Website: Official website

History
- Status: Parish church

Architecture
- Functional status: Active
- Architect: William Robertson of Elgin
- Architectural type: Church
- Style: Gothic
- Completed: 1837

Administration
- Diocese: Aberdeen
- Deanery: St. Joseph's

Clergy
- Priest: Fr Laurence Gambella (acting)

St. Mary's, Inverness is a Roman Catholic church in the city of Inverness, Inverness-shire, in Scotland and is a part of the Diocese of Aberdeen. The building is significant for the high quality of its altar and stained glass windows. There is daily Mass in the church and it is also the home of the Polish-language Chaplaincy for Inverness.

== History ==
The church was opened on 2 April 1837. Earlier, local members of the Catholic Church in Scotland had worshipped on Margaret Street, with the Mission separated from Eskdale in 1827, and it was known in the town "as a place where Lord Lovat and the tinkers worshipped". There were said to be about 400 Catholics in Inverness in 1846.

The presbytery was built at a cost of £1,200 in 1888 due to the benevolence of Miss Jessie McDonell. On 22 August 1894 a solemn re-opening of the church took place as the sanctuary had been remodelled to accommodate 250 extra worshippers and an altar designed by Peter Paul Pugin built by Carruthers of Inverness as well as Stations of the Cross. The sanctuary was remodelled with a new altar and tiles in order to conform with changes in liturgy heralded by the Second Vatican Council in 2014.

A school was built in 1845 staffed by Franciscan nuns at first, but the building was replaced in 1943.

=== Scotland's first married Catholic priest ===
In 2005, Father James Bell became the first married Catholic priest to be ordained in Scotland. A special dispensation from the Pope was made allowing him to not take up the normal vows of celibacy. Fr. Bell said: “I have enjoyed my time at St Mary's enormously. It is a marvellous parish and its people are so welcoming and friendly". He retired in 2023. Fr. Laurence Gambella, on loan from Salford Diocese, is now the Acting Parish Priest.

== Interior ==
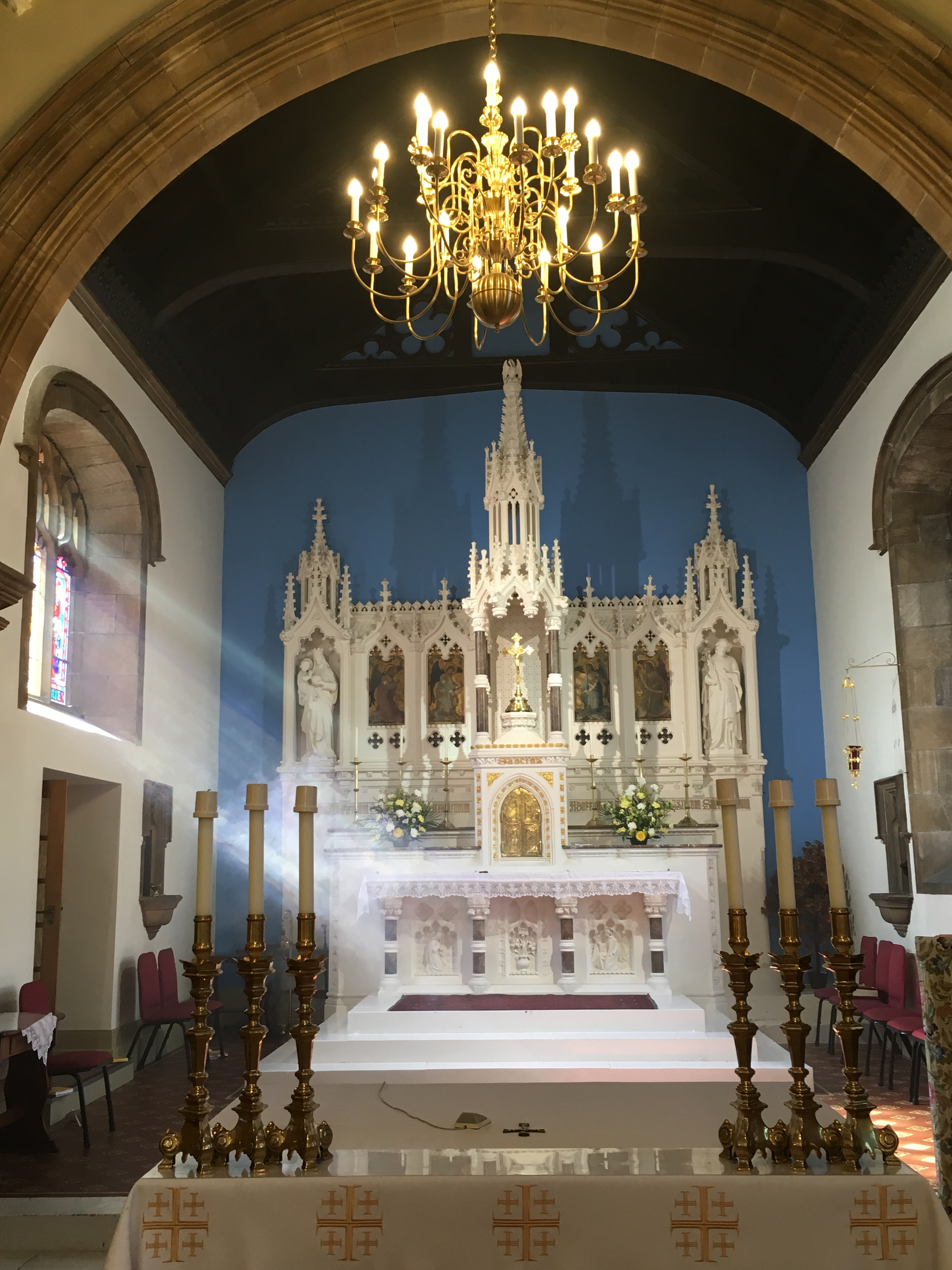
