= St Thomas of Canterbury Church, Newport, Isle of Wight =

Catholic church in Newport, Isle of Wight, England

Coordinates: 50.6997°N 1.2938°W

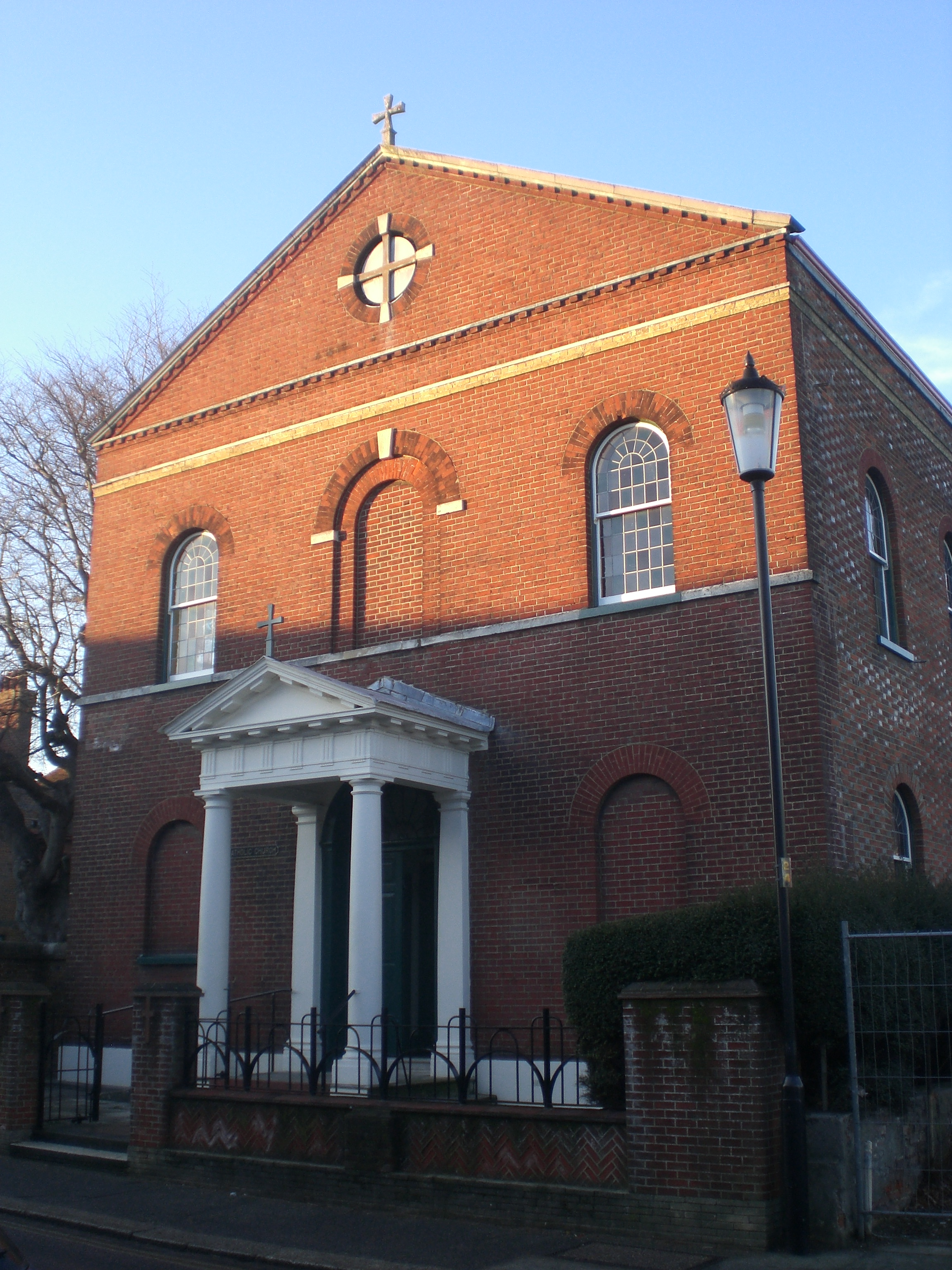
Front of the church

Saint Thomas of Canterbury church is a church serving the Catholic population of Newport, Isle of Wight, UK. It holds historical significance as the first purpose-built Catholic church constructed after the Protestant reformation on the island, and is reputedly also the first such church in England. The Roman Catholic Relief Act 1791 (31 Geo. 3. c. 32) placed restrictions on the design of Catholic places of worship. For this reason there is no steeple, bell, or anything else that makes the building look like a church building of the state religion, the Church of England. This makes the building look quite plain from the outside.
