= St Augustine's Church, Darlington =

Coordinates: 54.5235°N 1.56°W

St Augustine's Church
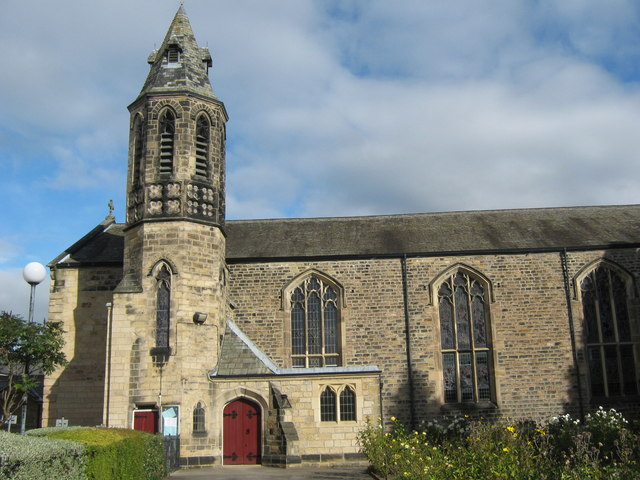
- Church entrance

- Location in the County Durham
- OS grid reference: NZ 28586 14382
- Location: Darlington
- Country: England
- Denomination: Roman Catholic

History
- Status: Parish church
- Dedication: St Augustine

Architecture
- Functional status: Active
- Heritage designation: Grade II listed
- Designated: 24 July 1990
- Architect: Ignatius Bonomi
- Completed: 1827

Administration
- Province: Liverpool
- Diocese: Hexham and Newcastle

St Augustine's Church is a Roman Catholic parish church in Darlington, County Durham. The church was built in 1827 to a design by Ignatius Bonomi, was enlarged and remodelled by Joseph Hansom in 1865, and is a Grade II listed building.
