= St Joseph's Church, Gateshead =

Church in Tyne and Wear, England

St Joseph's Church
- St Joseph's Catholic Church
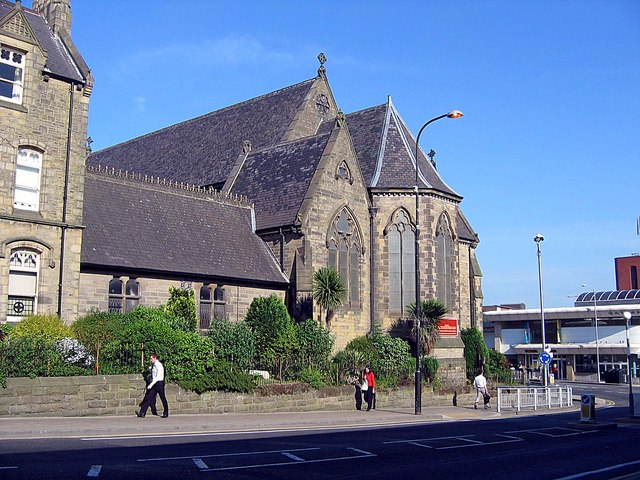
- St Joseph's Church
- 54°57′51.5″N 1°36′14.4″W
- Denomination: Roman Catholic
- Website: St Joseph's RC Church Gateshead

Administration
- Diocese: Hexham and Newcastle
- Deanery: St Joseph and St Robert of Newminster
- Parish: Gateshead

Listed Building – Grade II
- Official name: Church of St Joseph and Presbytery
- Designated: 26 April 1950
- Reference no.: 1248573

St Joseph's Church is a Catholic church in Gateshead, in the county of Tyne and Wear, England.

== History ==
Prior to the establishment of the Parish of St. Joseph's and the construction of St. Joseph's church in 1859, there had been no Catholic Church for the Catholic community in Gateshead.

Gateshead was once the dwelling place for the Venerable Bede. In his Historia ecclesiastica gentis Anglorum (The Ecclesiastical History of the English People), he mentions a certain Utta, the illustrious abbot of the Monastery of Gateshead. This influential monastery was in existence until the dissolution of the monasteries, after which the estate came into the possession of the Riddell family. Mass was said (in secret) in the chapel of the estate and it was there that the Rev. John Ingram was martyred for daring to fulfill his priestly functions in front of the Riddell's mansion just near the church of the Trinity on Gateshead High Street on 25 July 1594.

The Chapel on the Riddell's estate continued to be served by priests until it was pillaged and burnt in the year 1746 along with their mansion. For one hundred years Gateshead was without a Catholic church, chapel or priest, until St. Joseph's was built in 1859.

It was in 1850 that Bishop Hogarth appointed Father Betham, a curate of St. Andrew's Church, Newcastle, to make preparations for starting a parish in Gateshead. He proceeded to send a letter to 'the faithful Catholics of the parish of Gateshead’, asking them, among other things, to start a fund for the building of a church. He described himself in the letter as parish priest elect of Gateshead and the parish officially started in 1851 when Father Betham took up residence at 51 St. Catherine Terrace. The first name of the parish was Our Lady and St. Wilfrid's, and the temporary chapel was in the top story of a warehouse in Hillgate.

Father Betham left in 1853 and then the parish was served by the priests of St. Mary's, Newcastle. After the fire of 1854, the Assembly Rooms of the Queen's Head Hotel on Bottle Bank were used as a chapel until St. Joseph's Church was opened. Under the first parish priest, Father Edward Consitt, the parish came to be known as St. Joseph's and not as its originally intended name of Our Lady and St. Wilfrid's.

On May 25, 1858, the foundation stone was laid by the Bishop of the Diocese, Bishop Hogarth. Father Edward Consitt was the parish priest. The architect appointed to complete the church was Mr. Archibald Dunn, and the contractor a Mr. Hogg. Over a year later, on 5 July 1859, Bishop Hogarth came again and opened and blessed St. Joseph’s. Bishop Briggs of Beverley was present at the ceremony together with a distinguished number of clergy and laity including consuls and titled people.

In 1864, St. Joseph’s School was opened on what is now the site of the Emmaus centre and car park. Father Thomas Matthews, the fourth parish priest of St. Joseph’s built the present presbytery. After Father Matthews came Father Green, remembered by the older members of the parish, for his love of the poor. Then after Father Green, Father Newsham, who, following in Father Matthew’s footsteps, built the Blessed Sacrament School. He left St. Joseph’s due to pressure from his bishop to build and reconstruct schools in Newcastle. After Father McDermott, who had to leave on account of ill health, Father Bull was appointed parish priest and he built the schools at All Saints’. Father Farrow followed later, who by his piety and strong faith deepened the piety of St. Joseph's people.

When St. Joseph's was first made a parish, the first Catholic parish in Gateshead, there were only about 3,000 Catholics in the town. In 1959 when the church celebrated its centenary there were seven Catholic parishes with about seven times as many Catholics.

The current Parish priest is Canon Michael Brown.
