= Our Lady Star of the Sea, Seaforth =

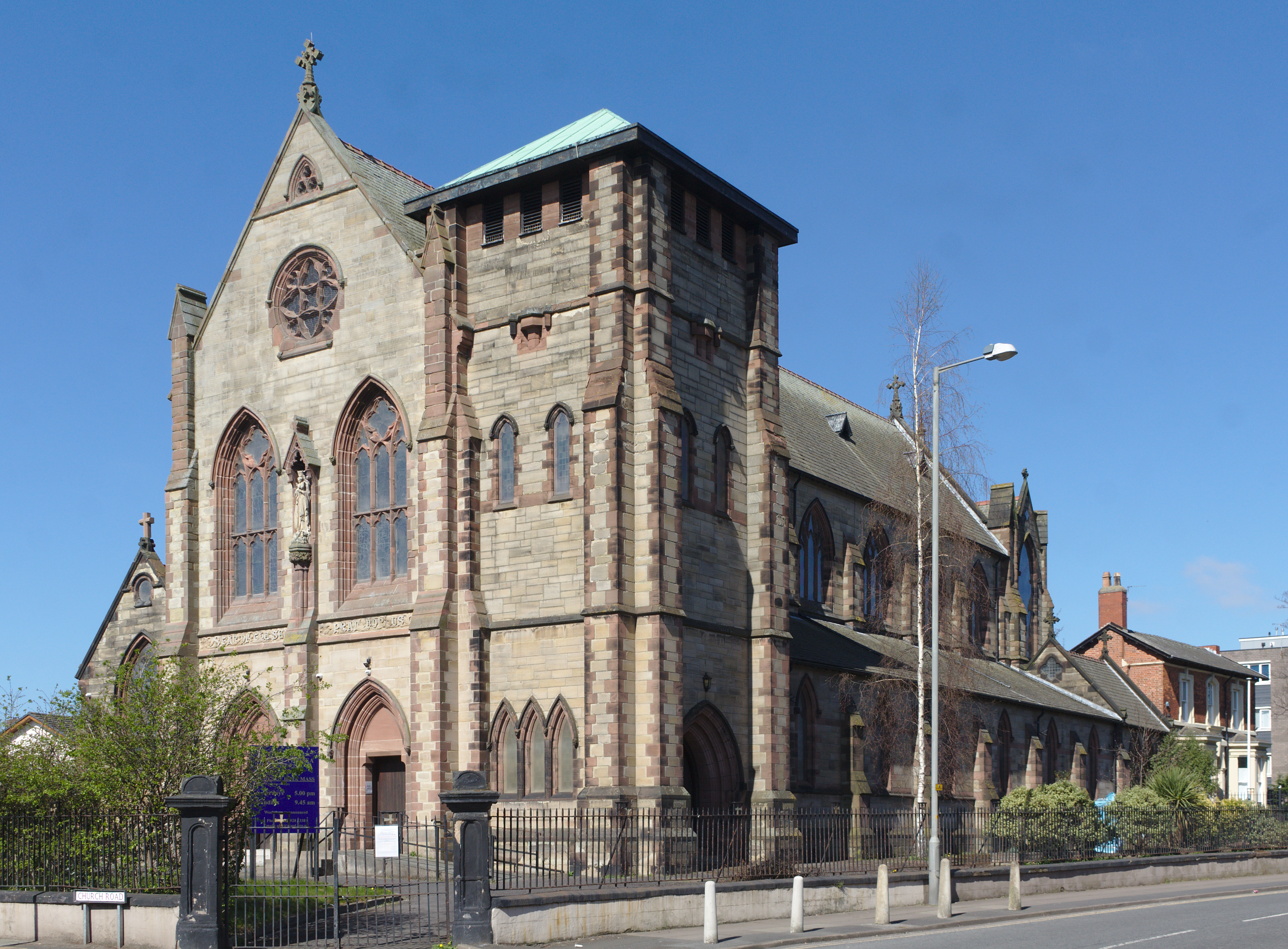
- Our Lady Star of the Sea, Seaforth
- 53.4633°N 3.0095°W
- OS grid reference: SJ 33080 96767
- Location: 1 Crescent Road, Seaforth, Merseyside
- Country: England
- Denomination: Roman Catholic
- Website: Church website

History
- Consecrated: 1909

Architecture
- Heritage designation

Listed Building – Grade II
- Official name: Church of Our Lady of the Sea
- Designated: 20 December 1996
- Reference no.: 1257655
- Architect(s): Sinnott, Sinnott & Powell
- Years built: 1898–1901

Administration
- Diocese: Liverpool

Our Lady Star of the Sea, Seaforth is a Roman Catholic church in Seaforth, Merseyside, England. Its building is listed.

== Origins ==
The church was founded in 1884, when it began services in a former stable. Its building was designed by Sinnott, Sinnott & Powell and built from 1898 to 1901. The church was consecrated in 1909.

== Listed building ==
The church building is a Grade II listed building.
