= Parafia Ealing =

Church building in Ealing, London, England

Coordinates: 51.5140°N 0.3008°W

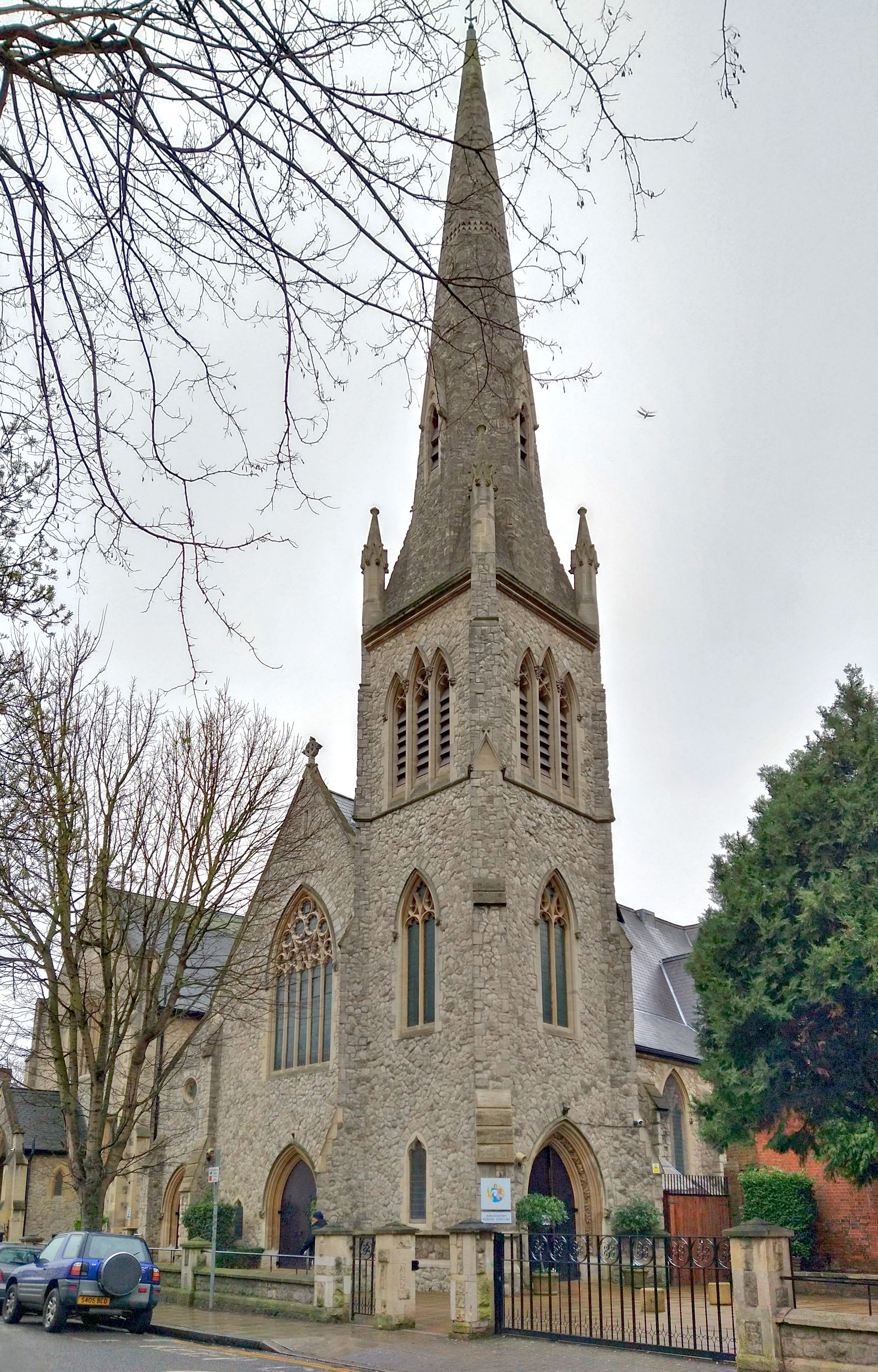
Parafia Ealing

Polish Roman Catholic Church of Our Lady Mother of the Church also known as Parafia Ealing is a Polish Catholic church in Ealing. It was formerly a Methodist church from 1892. Polish catholics formerly worshipped in Saint Matthew’s, Ealing Common, before settling in this church building. It is a Grade II listed building.
