= Our Lady of Compassion Church, Upton Park =

Church in Upton Park, London, England

Coordinates: 51°31′51.84″N 0°2′16.94″E

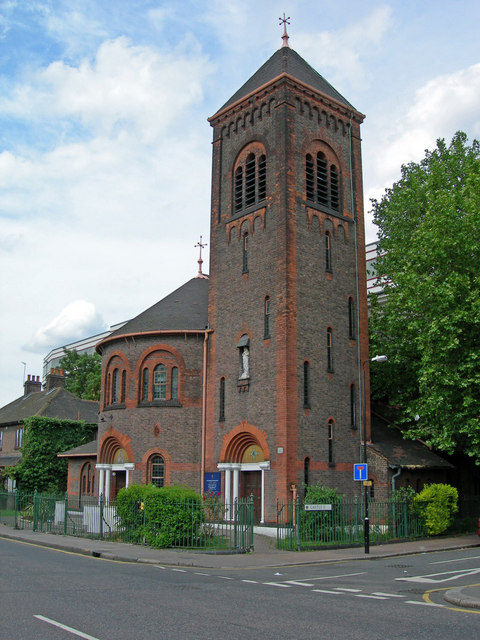
Our Lady of Compassion Church, Upton Park

Our Lady of Compassion Church is a Roman Catholic parish church in the Upton Park area of east London, dedicated to Our Lady of Compassion. Catholics in the area had previously worshipped at chapels attached to schools in the area until the church and its parish were both established in 1911.
