= St Edward the Confessor's Church, Scarborough =

Church in Scarborough, North Yorkshire, England

Coordinates: 54.271222°N 0.399585°W

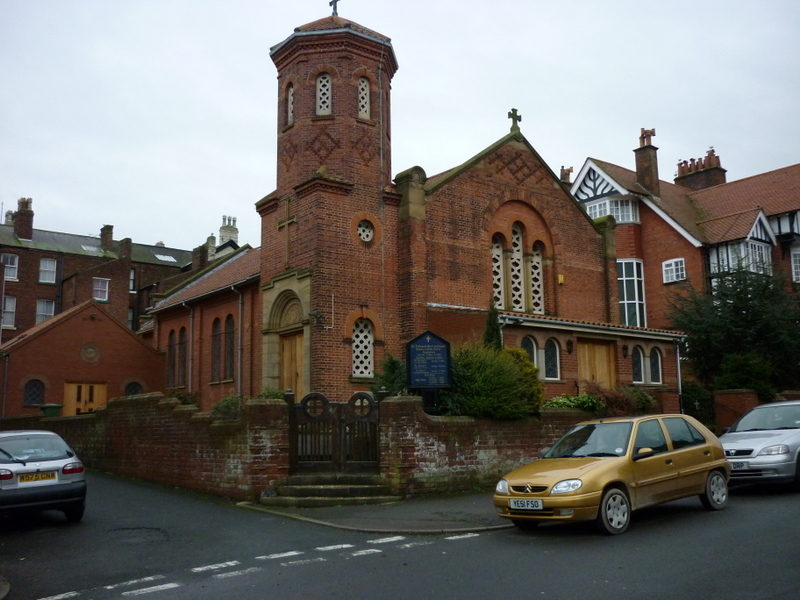
The building, in 2011

St Edward the Confessor's Church is a Catholic church in Scarborough, North Yorkshire, a town in England.

The first Catholic church in Scarbough was St Peter's. By the 1890s, the town had grown, and it was decided to establish chapels of ease in suburbs of the town. The first of these was St Edward the Confessor, in the South Cliff area of the town. Fundraising was slow, and work began in 1912, after a Mr Anderson from York donated £1,000. The building was designed by John Petch & Son, and was completed in 1914. It is in the neo-Byzantine style, described by Eugène Roulin as being "modernised with tactful taste". In 1968, the church was given its own parish, but it became a chapel of ease again in 1999.

The church is built of red brick with stone dressings, and has a pantile roof. It consists of a nave and sanctuary, porch and southwest tower. The tower is square in the lower stages and octagonal in its upper stage, with a tiled pyramidal roof. The windows have elaborate tracery, inspired by early Christian examples. The interior is simple, with a panelled dado, original oak pews, a stone altar with carvings of reindeer, and a stone reredos. There is a panelled canopy above the altar, and a wooden gallery at the west end.
