= St Joseph's Church, Preston =

Roman Catholic church in Lancashire, England

Coordinates: 53.7652°N 2.6792°W

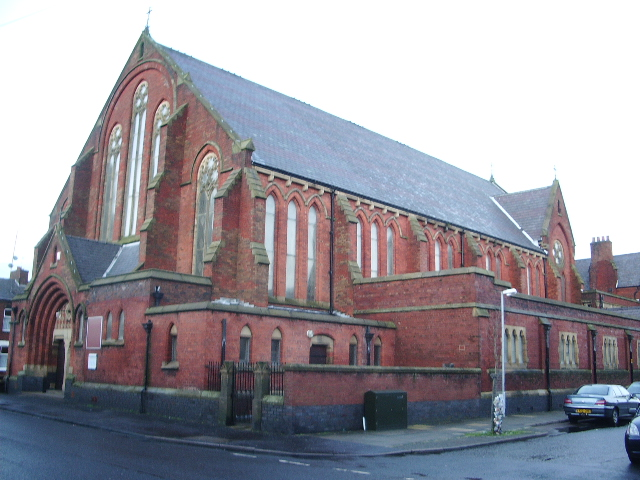
- St Joseph's Church, Preston, from the southwest

- Location within Preston
- OS grid reference: SD 553 301
- Location: Skeffington Road, Preston, Lancashire
- Country: England
- Denomination: Roman Catholic

History
- Dedication: Saint Joseph

Architecture
- Functional status: Active
- Heritage designation: Grade II
- Designated: 20 December 1991
- Architect: J. O'Byrne
- Architectural type: Church
- Style: Gothic Revival
- Groundbreaking: 1873
- Completed: 1874
- Construction cost: £8,000

Specifications
- Materials: Brick with sandstone dressings, slate roof

Administration
- Diocese: Lancaster

St Joseph's Church is in Skeffington Road, Preston, Lancashire, England. It is an active Roman Catholic church in the Diocese of Lancaster. The church is recorded in the National Heritage List for England as a designated Grade II listed building.

== History ==
The church was built in 1873–74 and designed by J. O'Byrne. It was built in a district of the town containing cotton mills, and was dedicated to Saint Joseph, the patron saint of workers. The church cost £8,000 to build. In 1897 improvements were carried out, including some decoration and the installation of the Stations of the Cross, at a cost of £2,000.

== Architecture ==
=== Exterior ===
St Joseph's is constructed in red brick with sandstone dressings and a slate roof. Its plan consists of a nave, north and south aisles, a sanctuary with side chapels (all of these in one vessel), and a north vestry and west porch. The gabled west end is divided into three parts by stepped buttresses, and there are similar buttresses at the corners. In the centre is a projecting porch, also gabled, containing an arched doorway with four orders of moulding, flanked by lancet windows. Above the porch are three tall stepped two-light windows within a round-headed arch, and on each side of these is a similar window under a hood mould. Along the sides of the church are six bays divided by stepped buttresses. Five of these contain triple lancet windows. The east bay is gabled and contains a wheel window. The apsidal sanctuary has an east window of five lancets.

=== Interior ===
The church has an "impressive hall-type interior". The arcades are carried on columns of polished pink granite, and the nave ceiling is barrel vaulted. The sanctuary and side chapels have mosaic floors. At the west end is a gallery with a wooden arcaded front. The reredos is elaborately carved. It has a central crocketed canopy with a spire, and side arcades with crocketed gablets. The reredos includes marble shafts, and in the side arcades are life-size statues. The marble pulpit is octagonal, contains statues in arched niches, and has a curved staircase. The stained glass in the east window is by Mayer of Munich. Elsewhere there is stained glass by Casolini of St Helens.

== External features ==
To the east of the church is a brick presbytery in Gothic style, with a crenellated porch. To the southeast of the church is the former school. This has a tower with a pyramidal spire containing triple arched bell openings.

== See also ==
- Listed buildings in Preston, Lancashire
