= Our Lady and St Cuthbert Church, Berwick =

Our Lady and St Cuthbert's Church
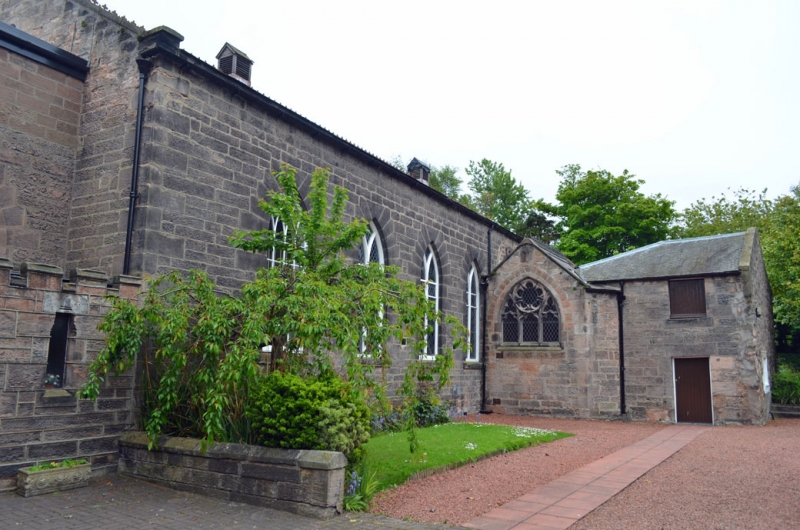
- Our Lady and St Cuthbert's Church
- 55.7696°N 1.9994°W
- OS grid reference: NU 00133 52922
- Location: Berwick-upon-Tweed
- Country: England
- Denomination: Roman Catholic
- Website: Official website

History
- Status: Parish church
- Dedication: Mary, mother of Jesus, Cuthbert

Architecture
- Functional status: Active
- Heritage designation: Grade II listed
- Designated: 9 February 1996
- Style: Gothic Revival
- Completed: 25 June 1829

Administration
- Province: Liverpool
- Diocese: Hexham and Newcastle
- Deanery: Lindisfarne
- Parish: Berwick

Our Lady and St Cuthbert Church is a Roman Catholic parish church in Berwick-upon-Tweed, Northumberland, England. It was built in 1829 in the Gothic Revival style, intentionally hidden away from the street. It is located on Ravensdowne to the south of Berwick Barracks in the centre of the town. It is a Grade II listed building.

== History ==
=== Foundation ===
During the Reformation the Catholics in Berwick and the surrounding area were served by Jesuit priests who were based in Berrington and Haggerston. In 1799, two French Catholic priests, escaping the French Revolution, were resident in Berwick in a property bought for them by the Sir John Haggerston. They celebrated Mass in a chapel next to the house. In 1810, they were replaced by Benedictine priests.

=== Construction ===
The Benedictine priests, with the Haggerston Baronets, bought the site of the current church. It was built to have a capacity of 300 people. On 25 June 1829, it opened. The old priest house became a school. In 1852, the church was given a painting of the Agony in the Garden by a local man, James Grieve, who was originally given the painting by King Charles X of France. In the 1880s, the church was extended, doubling in size. The current chancel and north window were built. The school building was replaced by St Cuthbert's School, which later moved and the building became the parish centre.

== Parish ==
At some point the Benedictine priests left the parish and were replaced by priests from the Diocese of Hexham and Newcastle. The church is currently served by a Carmelite, Fr Paul Jenkins. The parish is partnered with St Aidan's Church in Seahouses and St Aidan's Church on Lindisfarne. Our Lady and St Cuthbert's Church has two Sunday Masses at 6:00pm on Saturday and 9:30am on Sunday.

== Exterior ==
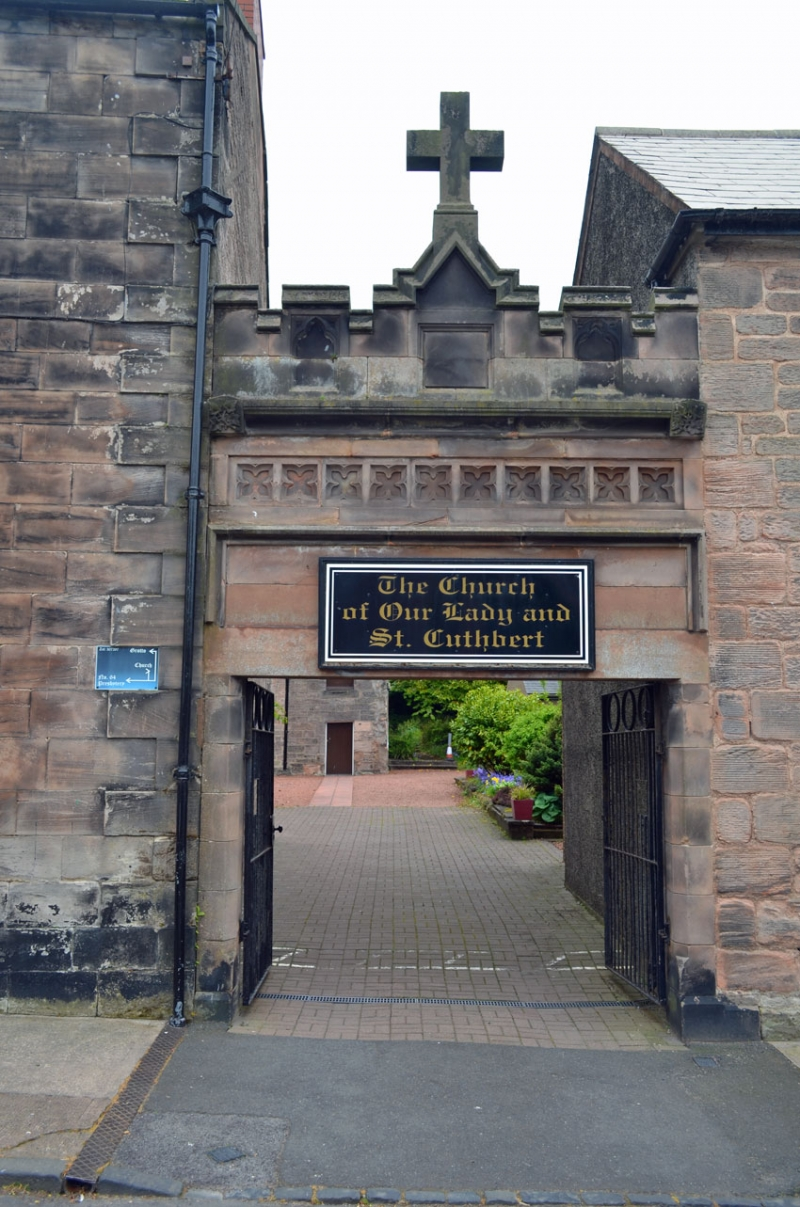
Entrance

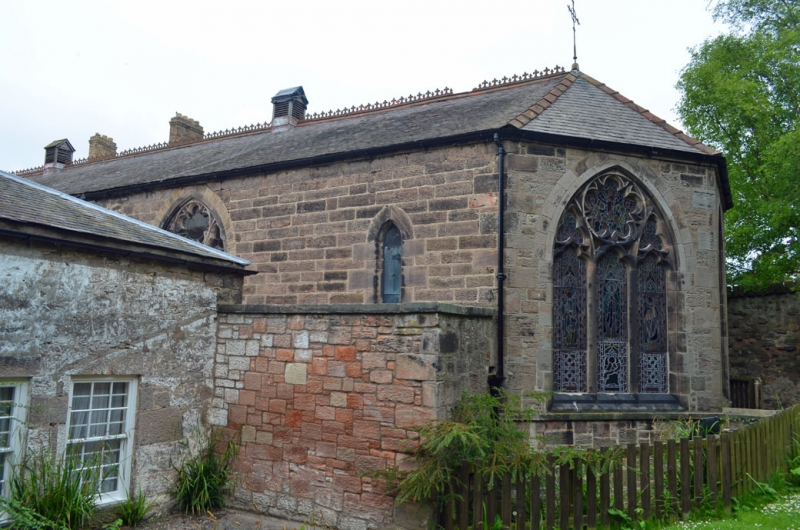
Back of church

== See also ==
- Media related to Our Lady and St Cuthbert's Church, Berwick-upon-Tweed at Wikimedia Commons
- Diocese of Hexham and Newcastle
