= Church of St Mary and St Michael, Llanarth =

Coordinates: 51.7899°N 2.8994°W

Church of St Mary and St Michael, Llanarth, Monmouthshire
- St Mary's and St Michael's Church
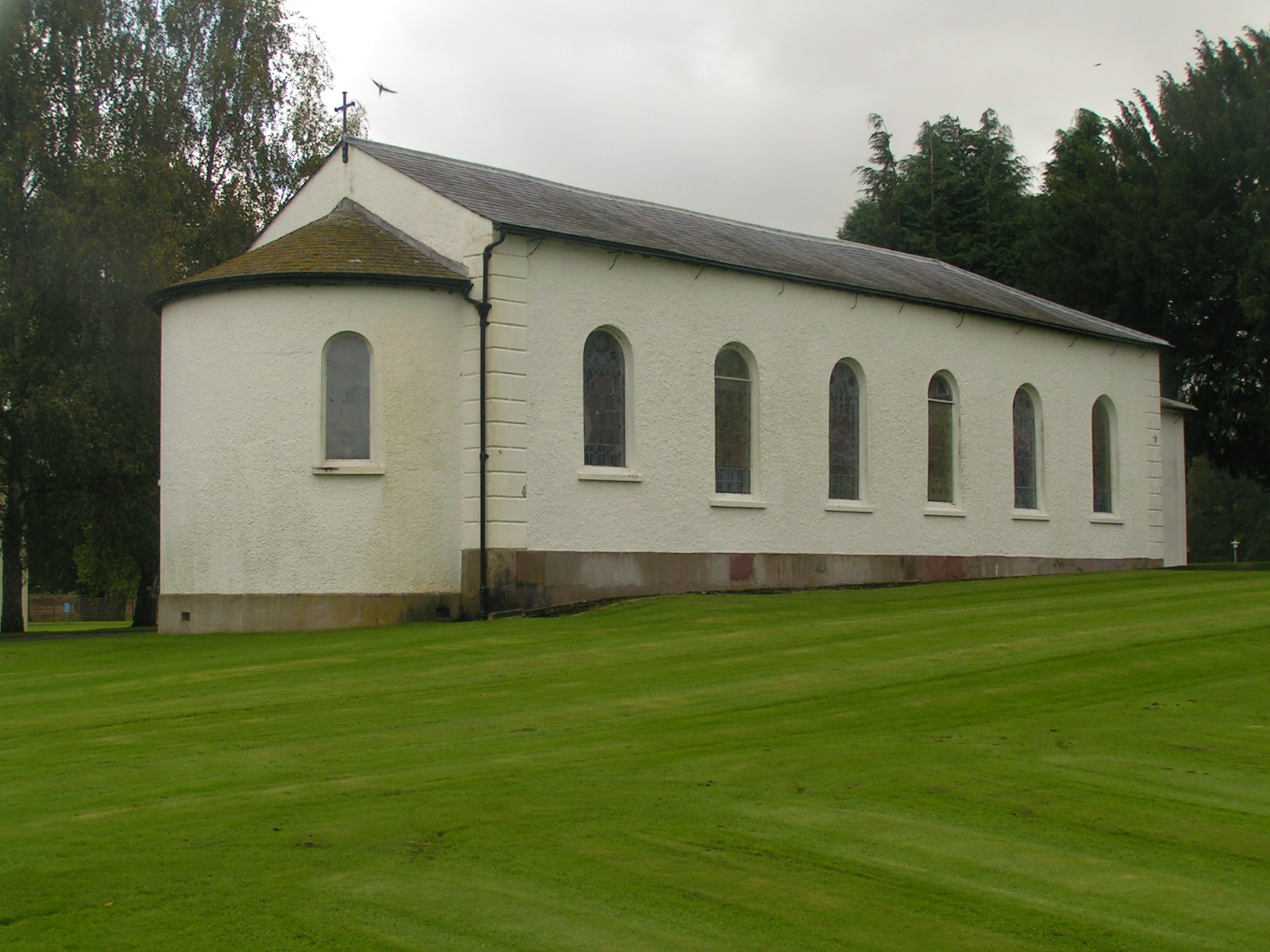

- Location in Monmouthshire
- Location: Llanarth, Monmouthshire
- Country: Wales
- Denomination: Roman Catholic

History
- Status: Roman Catholic church
- Founded: c.1790

Architecture
- Functional status: Active
- Heritage designation: Grade II*
- Designated: 9 January 1956
- Architectural type: Church

Administration
- Archdiocese: Cardiff-Menevia

Clergy
- Priest: Fr Matthew Carney OSB

The Church of St Mary and St Michael, Llanarth, Monmouthshire, was built as the family chapel for Llanarth Court. It was the first Roman Catholic church constructed in the county since the Dissolution of the Monasteries in the mid-16th century. Built circa 1790, some decades before the Roman Catholic Relief Act 1829, it was designed to look like an orangery, or barn, in order not to attract anti-Catholic hostility. It is considered one of the oldest, if not the oldest, Catholic churches in Wales.

== History ==
Following the Reformation, Monmouthshire, and particularly the north of the county, became an area of significant recusancy. The Joneses of Llanarth Court were an old Catholic family, and had supported a priest at Llanarth since 1781. In the late 18th century, the family chapel at the Court became insufficient to accommodate the numbers of worshippers and the family constructed a larger church in the grounds. Tradition suggests the building was disguised as a tool-shed, although later authorities suggest the scale of the church indicates it is more likely to have been constructed to look like a barn or an orangery.

Following the Roman Catholic Relief Act 1829, the Herberts felt able to be less circumspect as to their Catholic faith and the church was extended, and decorated internally, in 1829. In 1947, the last of the Herberts to live at Llanarth Court, Fflorens Roch left the Court, and the church, to the Dominican Order, which operated a school in the buildings. After closure in 1986, the church came under the responsibility of the Roman Catholic Archdiocese of Cardiff. St Mary and St Michael is one of the oldest Catholic churches in Wales.

== Architecture and description ==
The building is a long single-storeyed structure covered in white render. The architectural historian John Newman suggests its design ensured the building; "could be mistaken for an orangery, as was doubtless intended". It has six rounded windows on its west façade. There is a small apse at the western end, and a projecting vestry. The interior has much original 19th century work and stained glass dating from the 16th to the 20th centuries.
