= Sts Simon and Jude Catholic Church, Streatham Hill =

Saints Simon and Jude
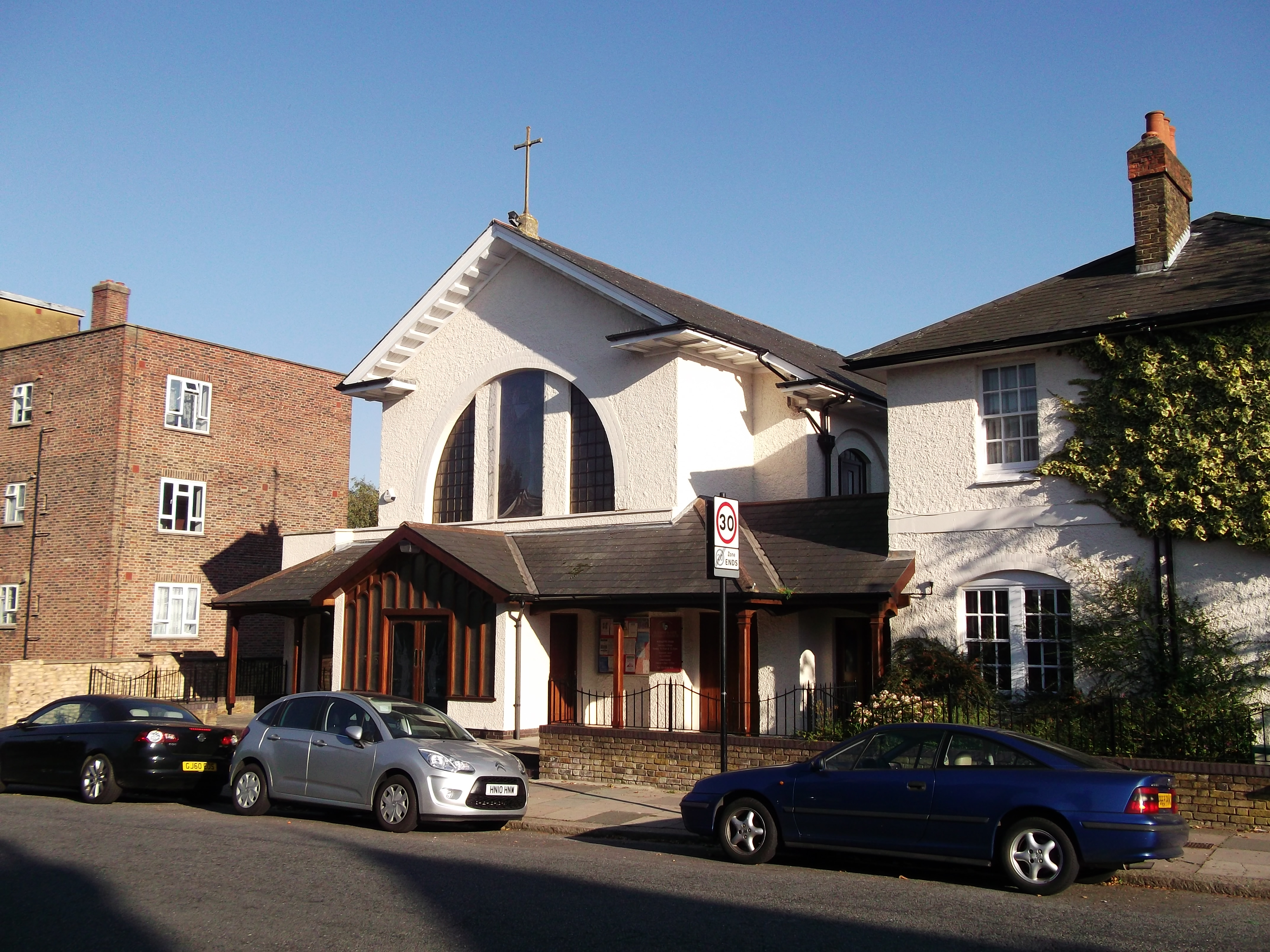
- Saints Simon and Jude
- OS grid reference: TQ 31102 72791
- Location: 5 Hillside, Streatham Hill, London
- Country: England
- Denomination: Roman Catholic

Administration
- Diocese: Archdiocese of Southwark

Clergy
- Priest: Father Valentine Erhahon

Saints Simon and Jude serves the parish of Streatham Hill

== History ==
The Catholic Community of Streatham Hill was founded in 1904 when Frances Elizabeth Ellis of Clapham Park gave Bishop Peter Amigo, fourth Bishop of Southwark, funds to build 12 churches in honour of the 12 apostles. Miss Ellis and her sister had bought the land from the London, Brighton and South Coast Railway Company. As in all the Ellis foundations, at Sts Simon and Jude there is a monthly Mass 'For all who have ever worshipped in this church'.

The church, designed by Clement Jackson, was opened in 1905 as the Tulse Hill Mission and Father (later Canon) Rory Fletcher, a former surgeon at Charing Cross Hospital, was appointed as the first Mission Priest.

The site of the Church was a cattle pond fed by a stream, which still runs underneath the church. Almost immediately, this stream was the cause of structural weakness, which has continued to give subsidence problems over the years. In the entrance hall to the sacristy, you can see plans for additions to the church which were never built for this reason.

By 1985, the whole property was suffering from subsidence, and daylight could be seen through many of the cracks in the walls of the church and house. An extensive and expensive programme of underpinning and repair to the whole structure had to be undertaken as a matter of urgency. At the same time, it was decided to start decorating the interior. The sanctuary was raised up one metre and a new altar of Ancaster stone backed by an oak dossal and damask hangings was installed. Cheshire sandstone was used for the Tabernacle pillar and the pulpit base. The great Cross and two hand-carved angels which came originally from Poland were gilded. A new Ahlborn electric organ was installed at the side of the sanctuary: it has an extra computer which reads and stores what the organist is playing, which means that it can play itself when the organist is not present, a great help when there are multiple Masses on one day. A programme to fill the windows with stained glass was undertaken by the artist Andrew Taylor of Devizes in a mediaeval style with the most recent addition of a central widow on the front of the Church with the image of the Divine Mercy. This is lit in the evening from inside the Church for the benefit of the local people. This window was designed and manufactured by Mrs Susan Ashworth of Blackheath, London. It was installed in 2004 to celebrate the Centenary of the building of the Church.
