= St Joseph's Church, Green Hammerton =

Former church in Yorkshire, England

Coordinates: 54°00′29″N 1°18′03″W

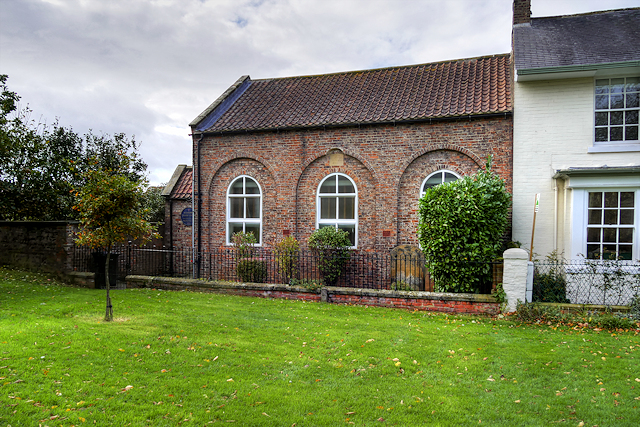
The church, in 2017

St Joseph's Church is a former Catholic church in Green Hammerton, a village in North Yorkshire, in England.

== History ==
The church was built as an independent congregationalist chapel, in 1797. It was well attended, and in 1801 a gallery was added. In 1851, it was recorded as able to seat 184 worshippers, with an average Sunday attendance of 55 adults and 39 children. It was linked with a chapel in Great Ouseburn, with the two sharing a minister. In 1902, a new porch was added at the front, and a room to hold Sunday school was added at the rear.

Catholics worshipped in nearby Nun Monkton until 1949, after which mass was celebrated in Green Hammerton's public reading room. In 1961, the parish of Our Lady, Acomb purchased the congregationalist chapel, and converted it into a Catholic church. The interior was entirely redesigned by Derek Walker, with a wooden altar on the north wall, and chairs arranged around it. It was later reordered, with the altar moved to the east end, and the chairs replaced by pews moved from St John's Church, Minskip. The schoolroom was converted into a kitchen, toilets and a sacristry. The church was closed in 2022.

== Appearance ==
The chapel is built of brick with a pantile roof. It is three bays wide, and the south facade has three brick arches set in recesses, each with an arched window. There is a stone sundial on the west gable. Inside, some elements of Walker's scheme survive, including the wooden former reredos on the north wall, and a cage of wood shielding the south windows.
