= St Michael's Church, Pillgwenlly =

Church in Newport, Wales

Coordinates: 51°34′34″N 2°59′07″W

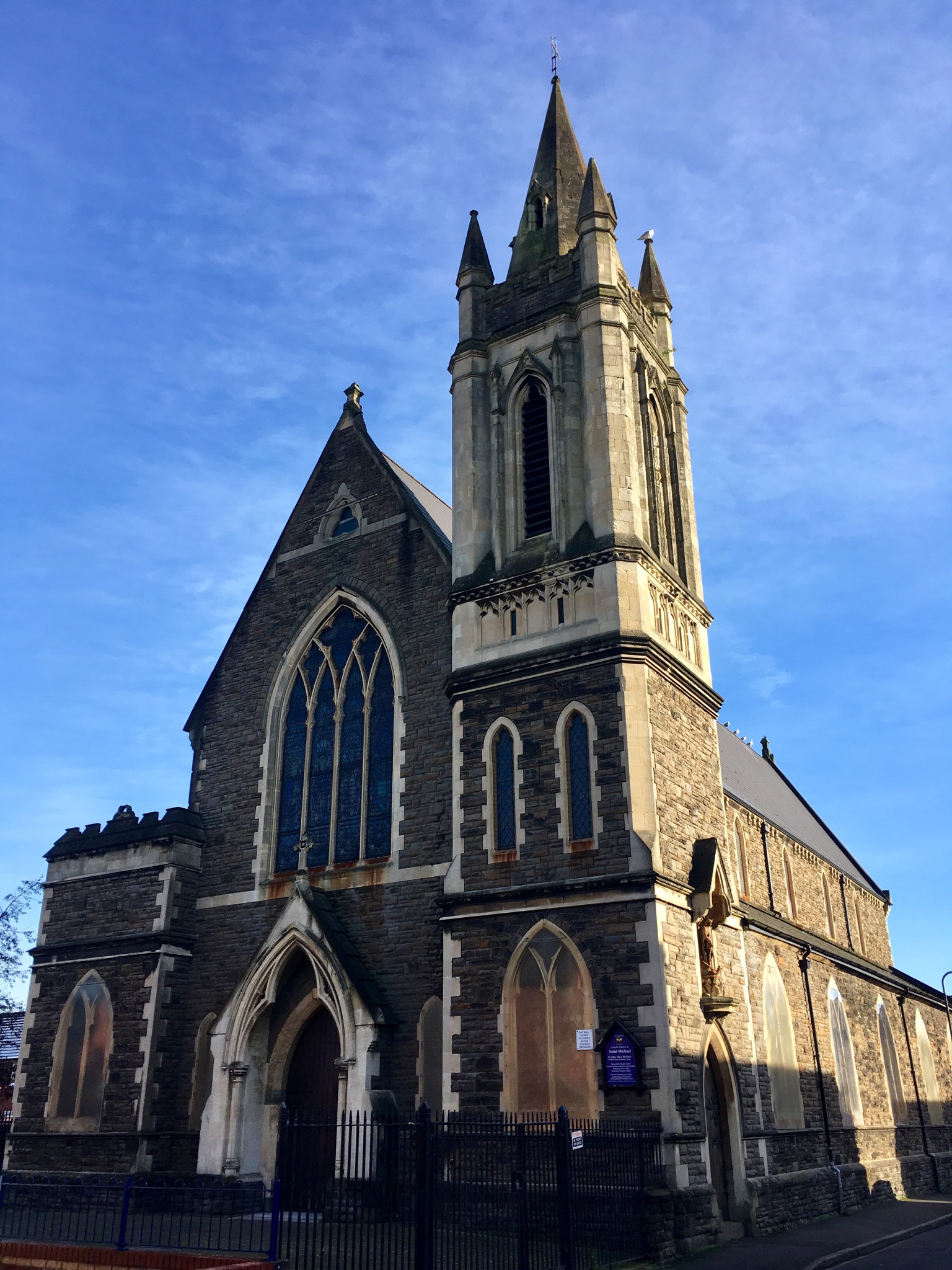
St Michael's in January 2020

St Michael's is a Roman Catholic church in Pillgwenlly in Newport, Wales. It located at the corner of Clarence Street and St Michael Street. St Michael's has been Grade II listed since January 1997.

The construction of the church was carried out by volunteer Irish immigrant labourers. The cost of the church was met by public subscription. The creation of the church served the Irish immigrants working at the Newport docks.

The church is built from Pennant sandstone dressed Bath stone. St Michael's has a slate roof with two prominent conical ventilators made from copper. The stained glass windows were installed in 1884. The windows were manufactured by Mayer of Munich.

The South Wales Echo described the church upon its completion in 1887 as a "fine, spacious edifice, having an elevation of 61 feet, and being divided by an arcading of six arches into nave and aisles. Provision is made for one thousand sittings, and when the design is fully carried out, a spire will be added to the present tower, of an altitude altogether of 100 feet...it has concrete foundations formed of Aberthaw pebble ground lime".

== See also ==
- Archdiocese of Cardiff-Menevia
