= Mythe Chapel =

Chapel at Tewkesbury on the Mythe, Gloucestershire, England

Coordinates: 52.003°N 2.162°W

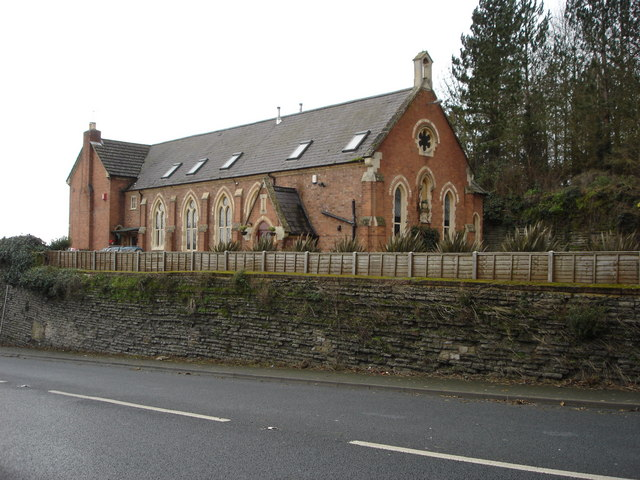
Mythe Chapel, now residential

The Mythe Chapel is located at Tewkesbury on the Mythe (off the A38 overlooking Mythe Bridge, between Severn Trent Water and the Tewkesbury Garden Centre). The Mythe Chapel was the only place of worship on the Mythe after the Dissolution. The chapel was built in 1870 with funds from the Marquis de Lys who had lived in Tewkesbury since 1863. An old group of stables originally occupied the site and were partly incorporated into the new building to which windows, niches and buttresses (in the Gothic style then fashionable) were added.

The re-awakening of Catholicism in Tewkesbury was signalled by an anonymous notice in the Laity Directory of 1834. It read. "A gentleman, in the neighbourhood, is willing to assist in establishing a chapel in Tewkesbury, when this desirable object can be entered upon with a probability of success".

The Mission was established in 1870. The first Missioner was Father Thomas William Fenn, D.D. who remained at Tewkesbury until his retirement in June 1905. The first St Joseph's Church opened at the Mythe on Saint Joseph's Day, 19 March 1870. Vicar General, Mgr Bonomi, performed the ceremony. On 8 December 1870 Pope Pius IX declared St Joseph to be Patron of the Universal Church. In 1977 the present St Joseph's Church, formerly a telephone exchange erected in 1938, was opened for Catholic worship and the old church at the Mythe was deconsecrated. The original stained glass windows were removed and relocated to the new facility. The Mythe Chapel was used for industrial purposes before being converted into residential housing by Peter and Wendy Vose between 1988 and 1990. The old presbytery was converted into September House and the main chapel was converted into a pair of cottages (1 and 2 September Cottages) retaining the original oak beams and carved oak chapel door as interior features.
