= History of Stonyhurst College =

Stonyhurst College as a school dates back to 1593 when its antecedent, the Jesuit College at St Omer, was founded in Flanders to educate English Catholics. The history of the present school buildings dates as far back as 1200 AD.

== Stonyhurst Hall ==
The earliest deed concerning the "Stanihurst" dates from 1200 AD and can now be found in the Arundell Library in the college, whilst the earliest evidence of a building on the site is from 1372 when John de Bayley was licensed to have an oratory there; the archway in the Bayley Room, within the 'Blind Tower', is believed to date from the fourteenth century, and may well be the only remnant of that earlier building. The oldest portion of the extant buildings however, the Shireburn Mansion (Stonyhurst Hall), was founded by the Roman Catholic, Richard Shireburn, a descendant of the Bayley family, whose son attended the College at St Omer. He built the gatehouse and open cupolas (known as "the towers") on top of an older settlement dating from 1592. The design of the gatehouse incorporates four of the classical orders (Doric, Ionic, Corinthian and Composite). Three similar designs appear on the buildings of Merton and Wadham College in Oxford, though those at Stonyhurs antedates them all by more than a decade. In places the exterior walls of this part of the building are as much as 6 feet (1.8 m) thick.

In 1648, during the English Civil War, Oliver Cromwell's army encamped near the hall on their way to the Battle of Preston. Cromwell spent the night at Stonyhurst and is reputed to have slept on a table, in the middle of the Great Hall, in full armour. He is said to have preferred this option to a bed because of fear of assassination and mistrust of his Catholic, royalist hosts. He was quoted as saying it was "the best half house" he had seen (the Hall was at that time still unfinished).

Richard Shireburn's successor and grandson, Sir Nicholas Shireburn, began an extensive building scheme to extend the "half house", and completed the great hall, gardens and avenue so that it could be a great manor house. Two ponds, each measuring 660 feet (200 m) by 112 feet (34 m) were constructed in 1696, along with the "causeway" between, today known as the Avenue. His son Richard was poisoned in the gardens in 1702, and with no male heir Nicholas ceased building. Upon his death in 1717, the buildings passed to his wife and then to their sole heir, Maria Shireburn, Duchess of Norfolk. The Duchess was married to Thomas Howard, 8th Duke of Norfolk, and lived at Arundel Castle in Sussex. Unoccupied, the buildings at Stonyhurst began to fall into disrepair.

In 1754, the estate was inherited by her cousin, Edward Weld (Senior). After his death it passed to Weld's eldest son, also Edward. Edward, who was to be Maria Fitzherbert's first husband, fell off his horse three months after the wedding and died intestate; the estate passed to Edward senior's third son and Edward's youngest brother, Thomas in 1761. Already living in Lulworth Castle, and able to dispense with an additional estate, and as a former pupil of the English Jesuit Colleges of St Omer and Liège, and a philanthropist, Weld stepped in to save the refugee Jesuit schools in France. He resolved in 1794 to donate his Lancashire estate, including the buildings, with 30 acres (120,000 m^{2}) of land to the Society of Jesus for the purpose of settling them and their evacuated charges from Northern France and the Austrian Netherlands.

The original hall has been altered and extended over the years to become one of the largest inhabited buildings in Europe and achieving Grade I listed status from English Heritage.

The village of Hurst Green, Lancashire developed with the hall. Richard Shireburn built the village school in 1686. He also built an almshouse on Longridge Fell, the predecessor of the Shireburn Almshouses, which his son Nicholas built in about 1707. The latter was dismantled in 1946 and re-erected in the village.

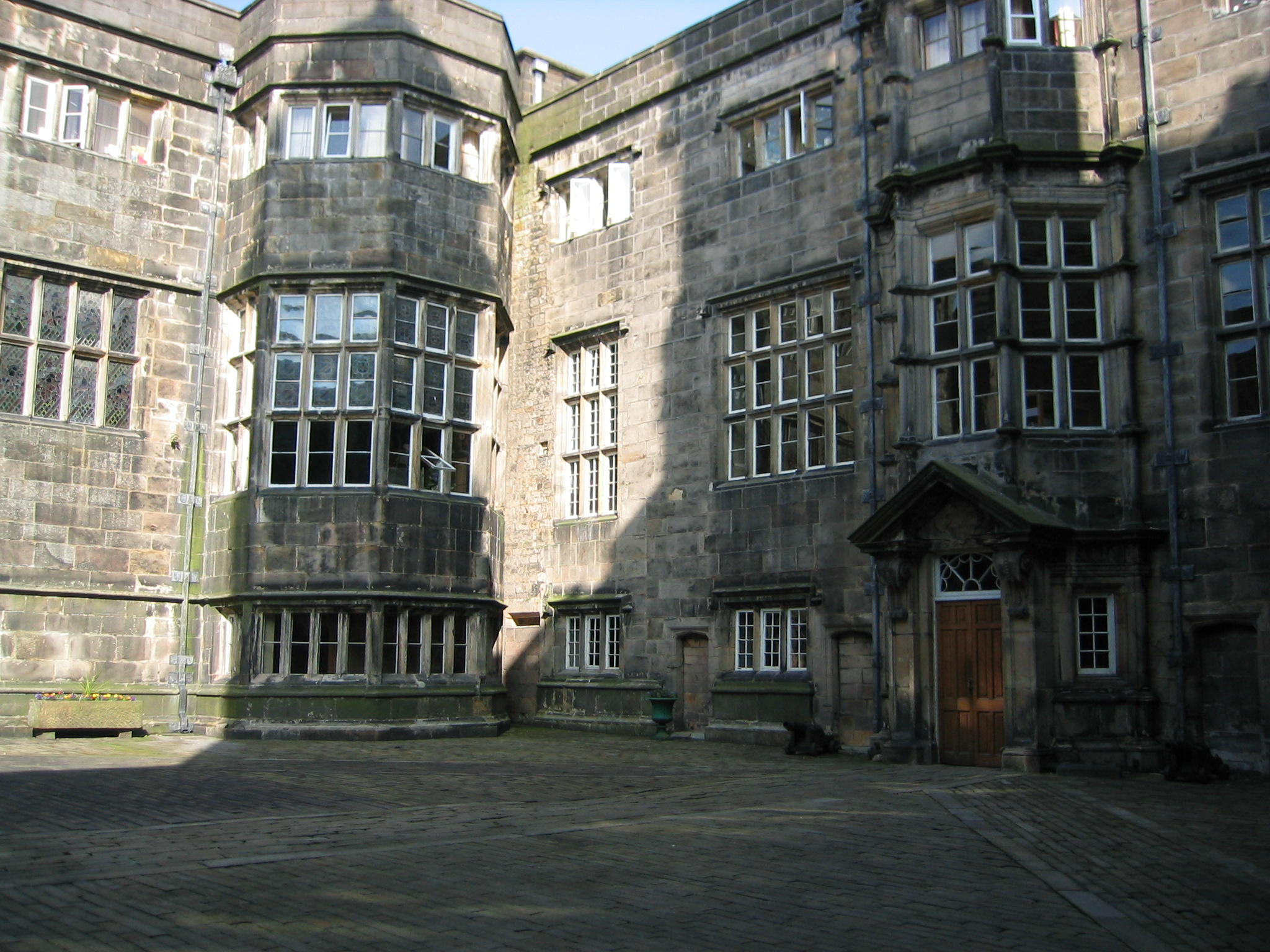
The Front Quadrangle, exterior of the Top Refectory.

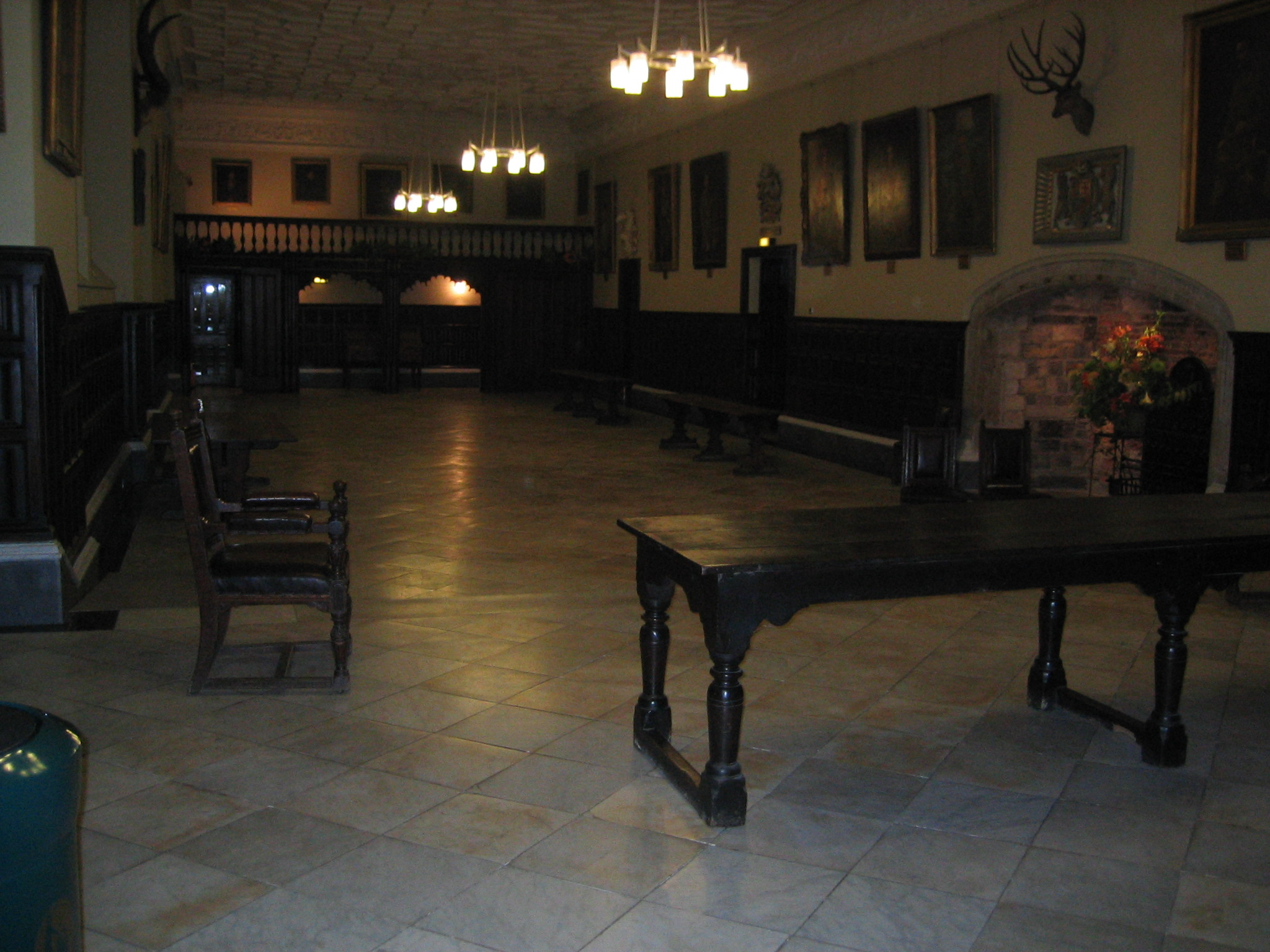
The Jacobean Great Hall, now known as the Top Refectory, where Cromwell spent the night.

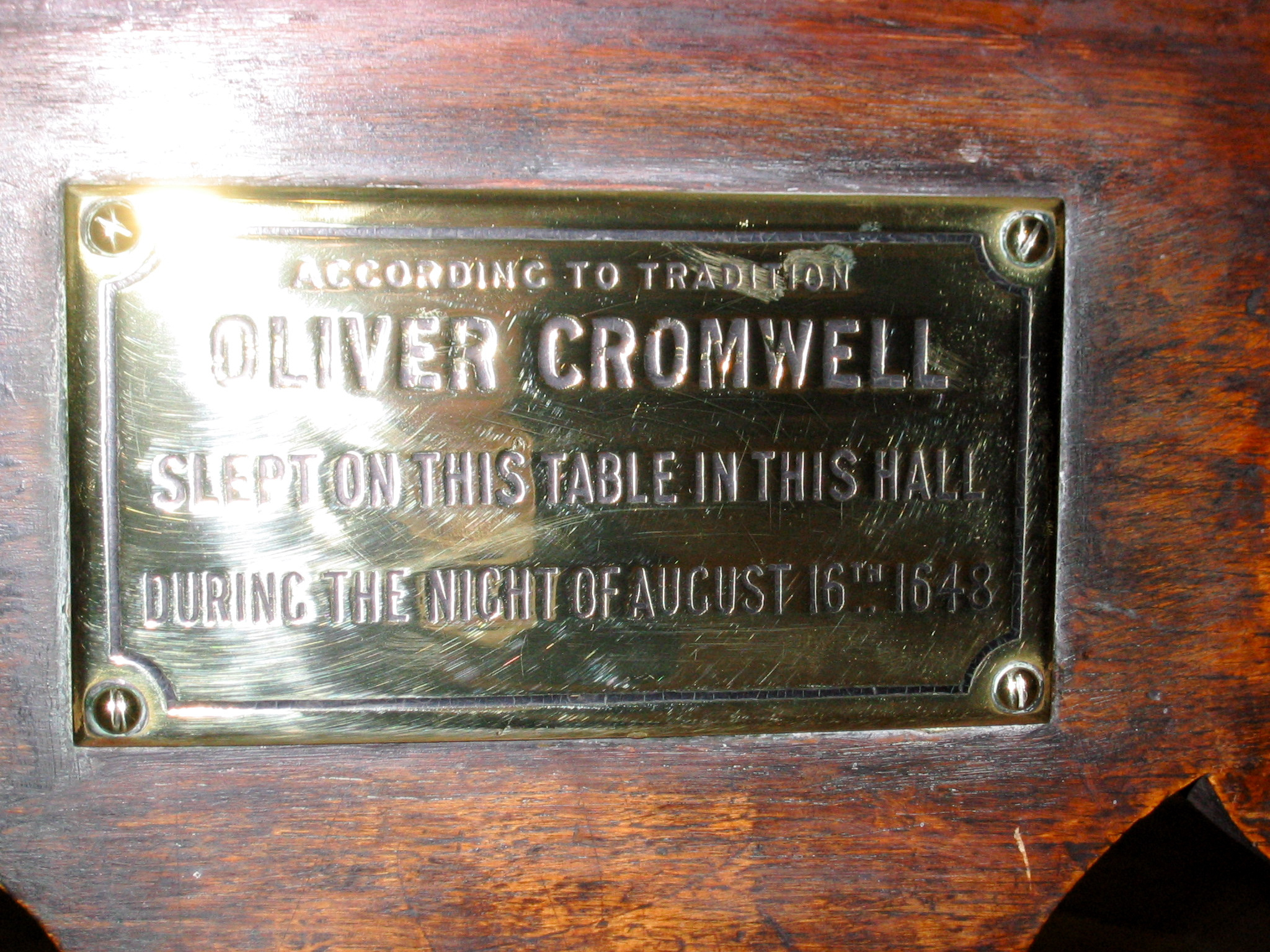
The table upon which Cromwell slept.

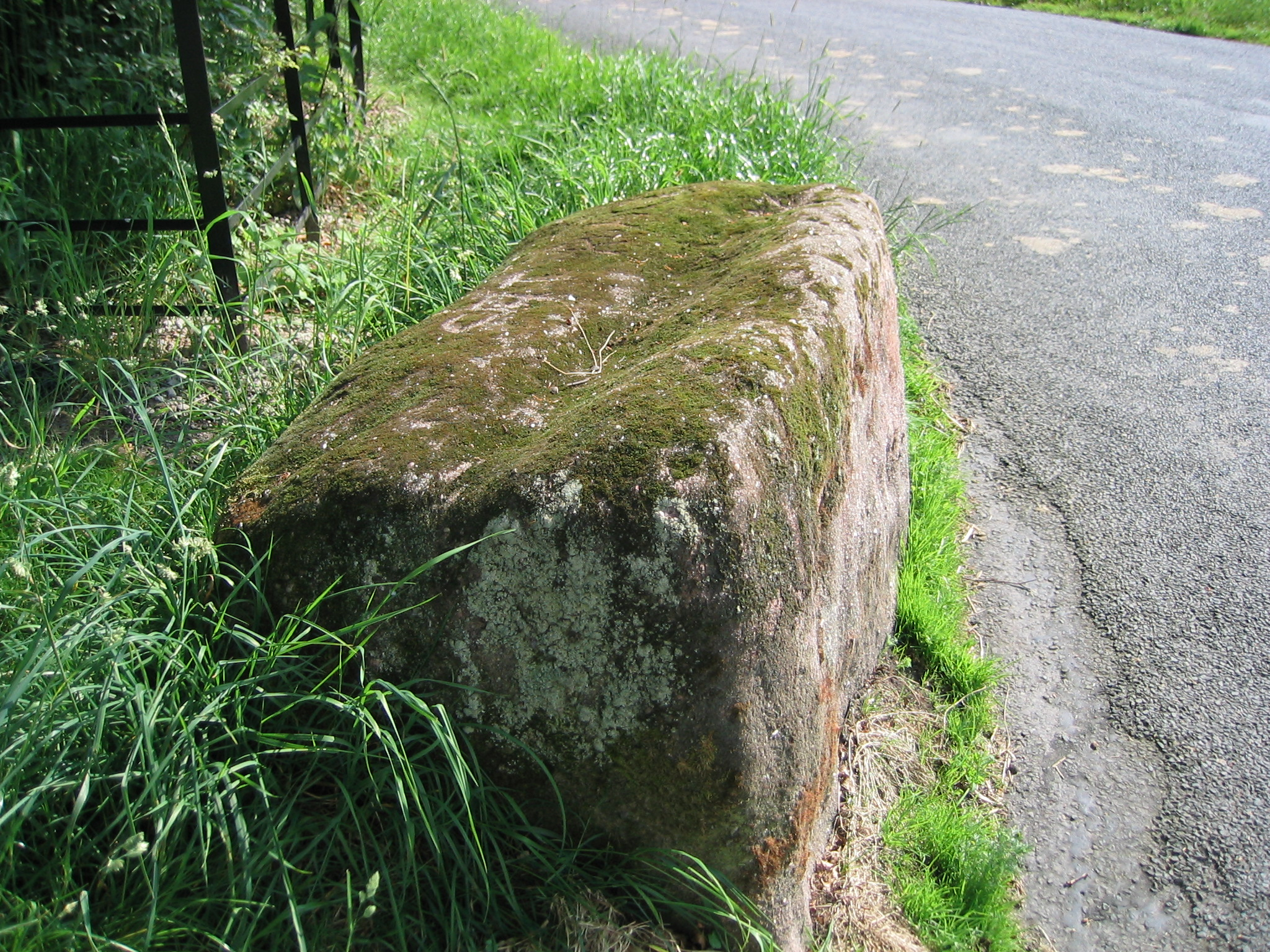
"Cromwell's Rock" where he is said to have called the Hall "the finest half-house in England".

== The College ==
=== 1593-1794 ===
The story of the school starts at St Omer in what was then the Spanish Low Countries in 1593, where a college was founded by Father Robert Parsons for English boys, unable to receive a Catholic education in Elizabethan England. As such it was one of a number of expatriate English schools operating on the European mainland during the centuries when Catholicism was proscribed in England.

In 1762, when the French Parlement turned against the Jesuits, the school, in what was then a part of France, was forced to move. During subsequent decades, when the Jesuit Order was suppressed in most countries, the college was one of the institutions through which it managed to maintain a continuous existence.

After St Omer (still known in Stonyhurst parlance by its old English name of St. Omers), the college settled in Bruges where it continued until 1773 when it was again forced to move, reassembling at Liège, under the protection of its bishop.

In 1794 yet another move was forced upon the school, and a new home was found at Stonyhurst Hall in Lancashire, an ideal county for the school to settle in because it was still a Catholic stronghold and its rural, isolated character provided the hope that the school would be left alone by the authorities. Not taking any chances however, a number of hiding places were created throughout the building should the Jesuits face persecution again, and when Saint Mary's Hall was constructed in the following century, a secret escape tunnel, which still survives, was also built linking the seminary to an exit in the gardens.

The honour of being the last student at Liège and the first at Stonyhurst was claimed by a George Lambert Clifford whose bust is today on display in the Do Room; it is recorded that he and a fellow pupil from Liège, Charles Brooke, were the first of the migrants to arrive at the Stonyhurst mansion and raced down the Avenue together, but whilst his antagonist was waiting to be let in, Clifford spotted an open window and darted in, to be remembered by posterity as Stonyhurst's first pupil.

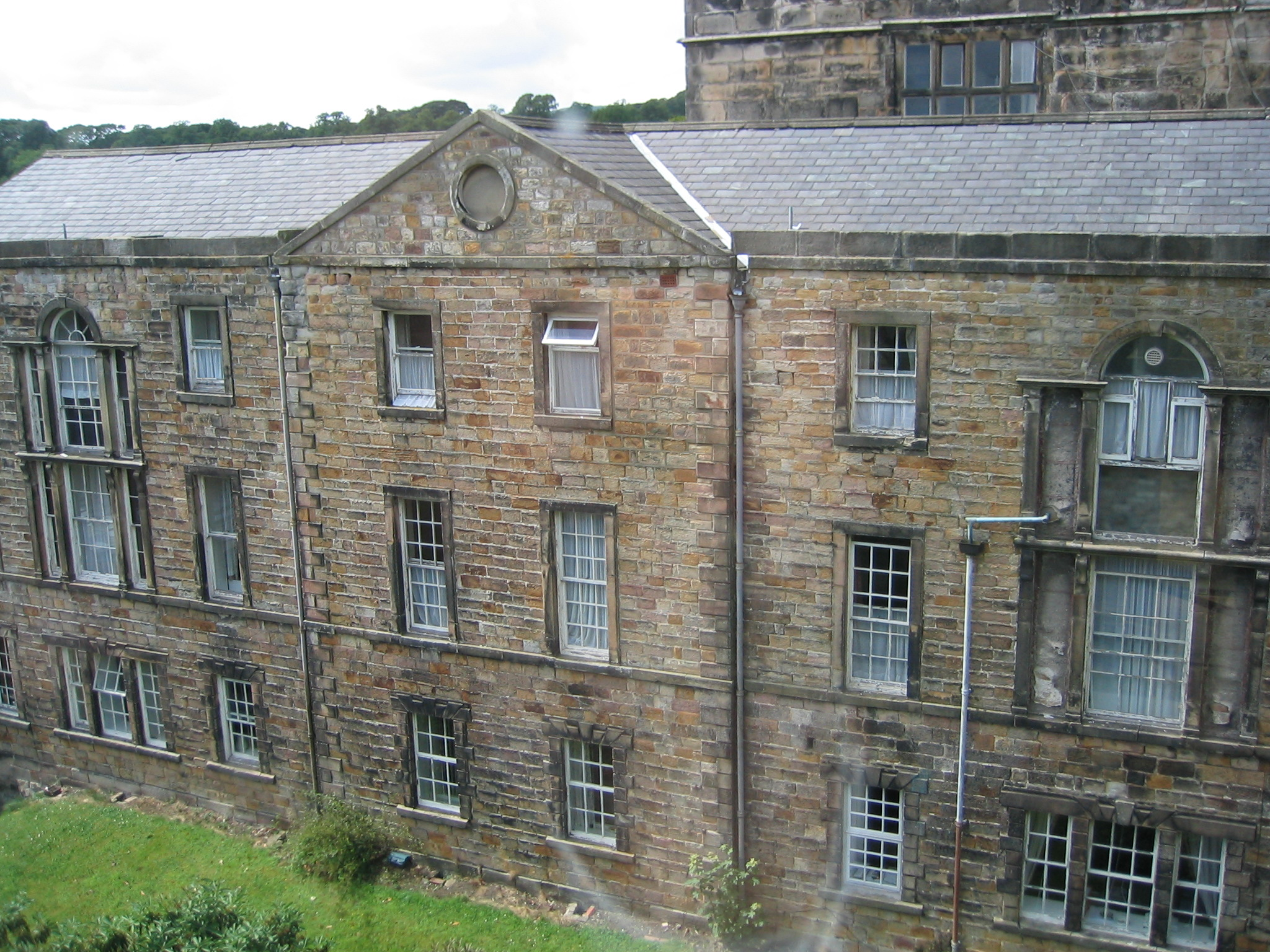
The Shirk Building. Built to accommodate the first pupils at Stonyhurst.

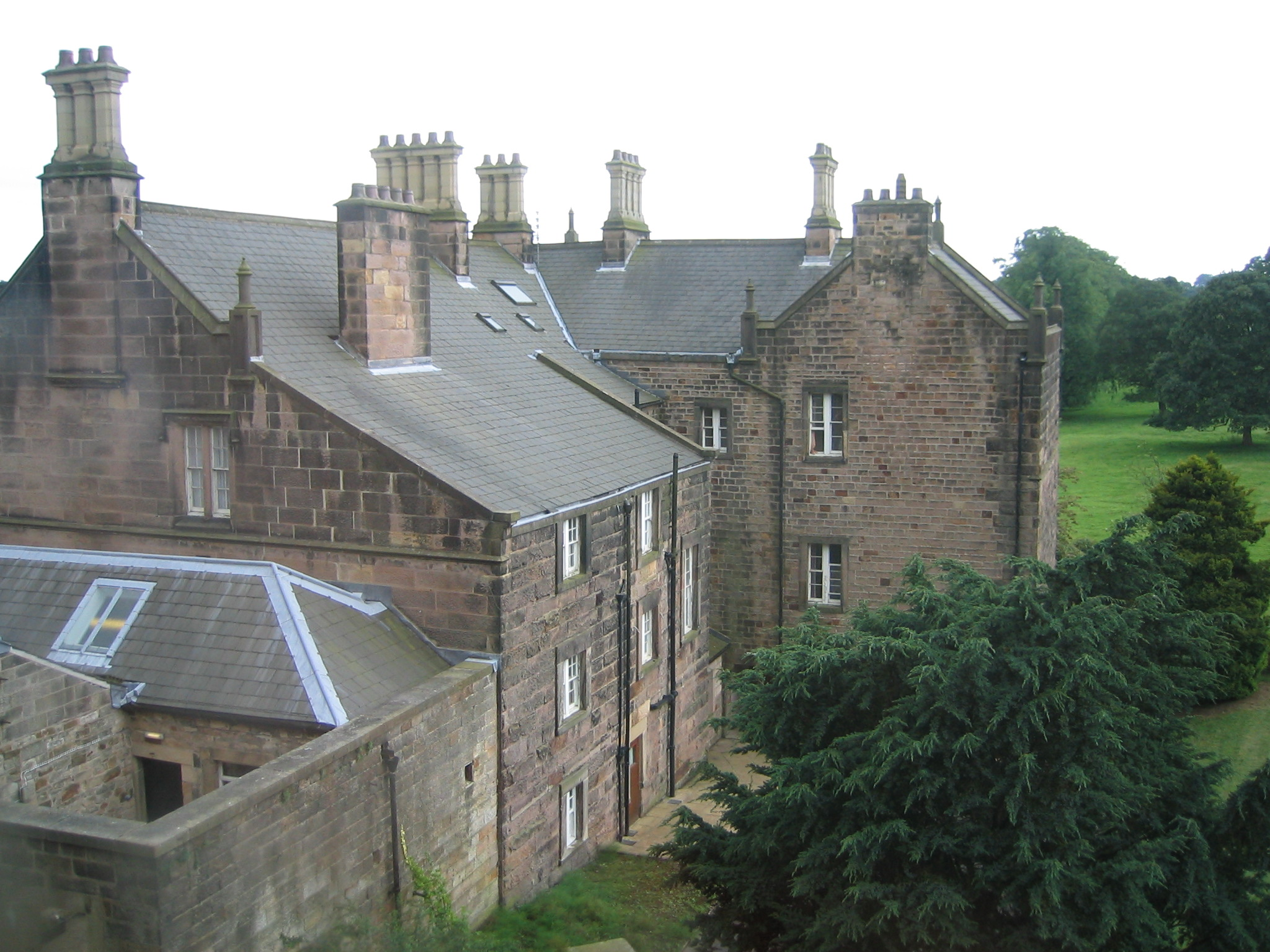
The Old Infirmary, now home to the Jesuit community, seen from New Wing.

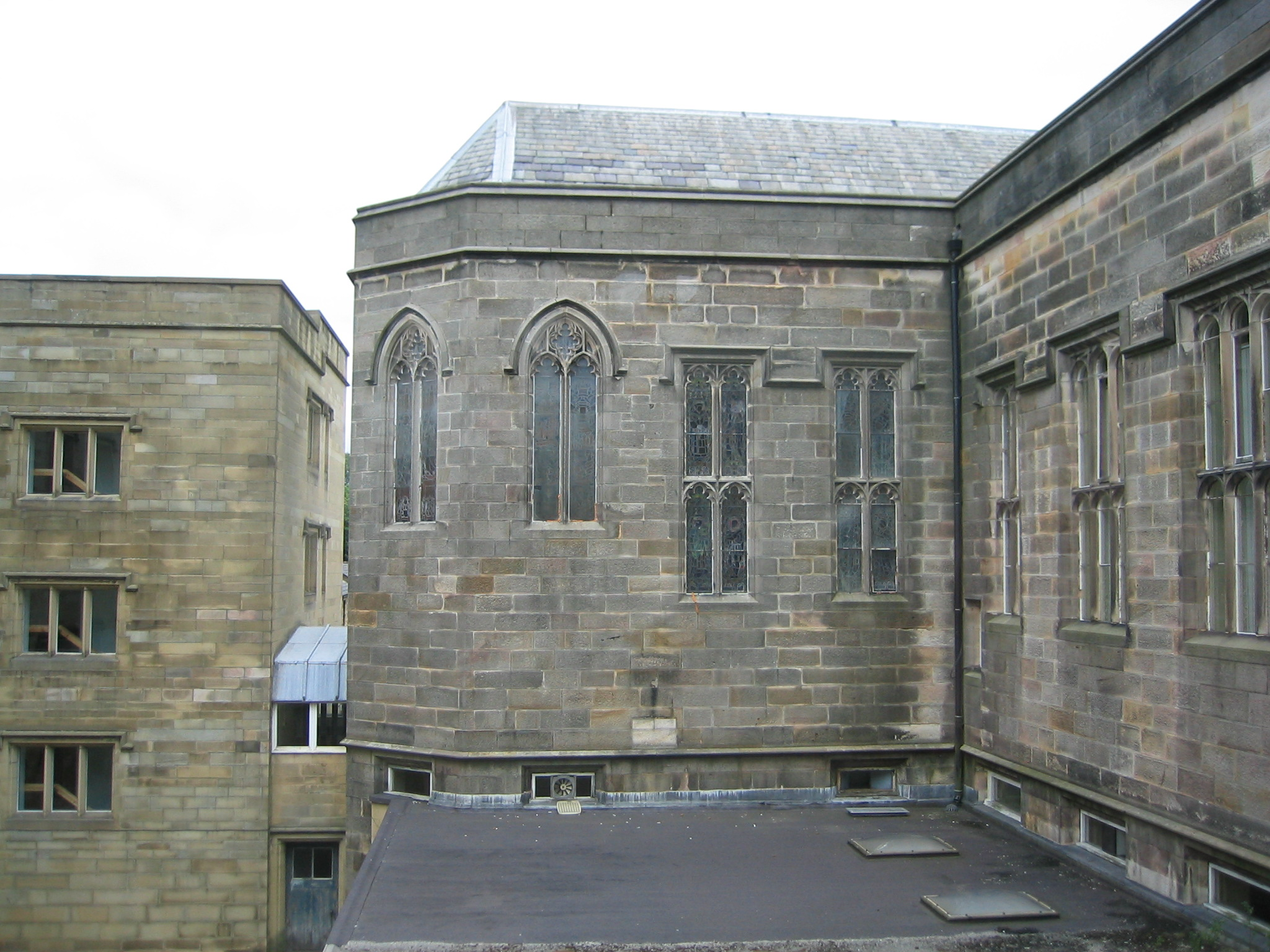
The exterior of the Sodality Chapel, right. The New Quadrangle, left.

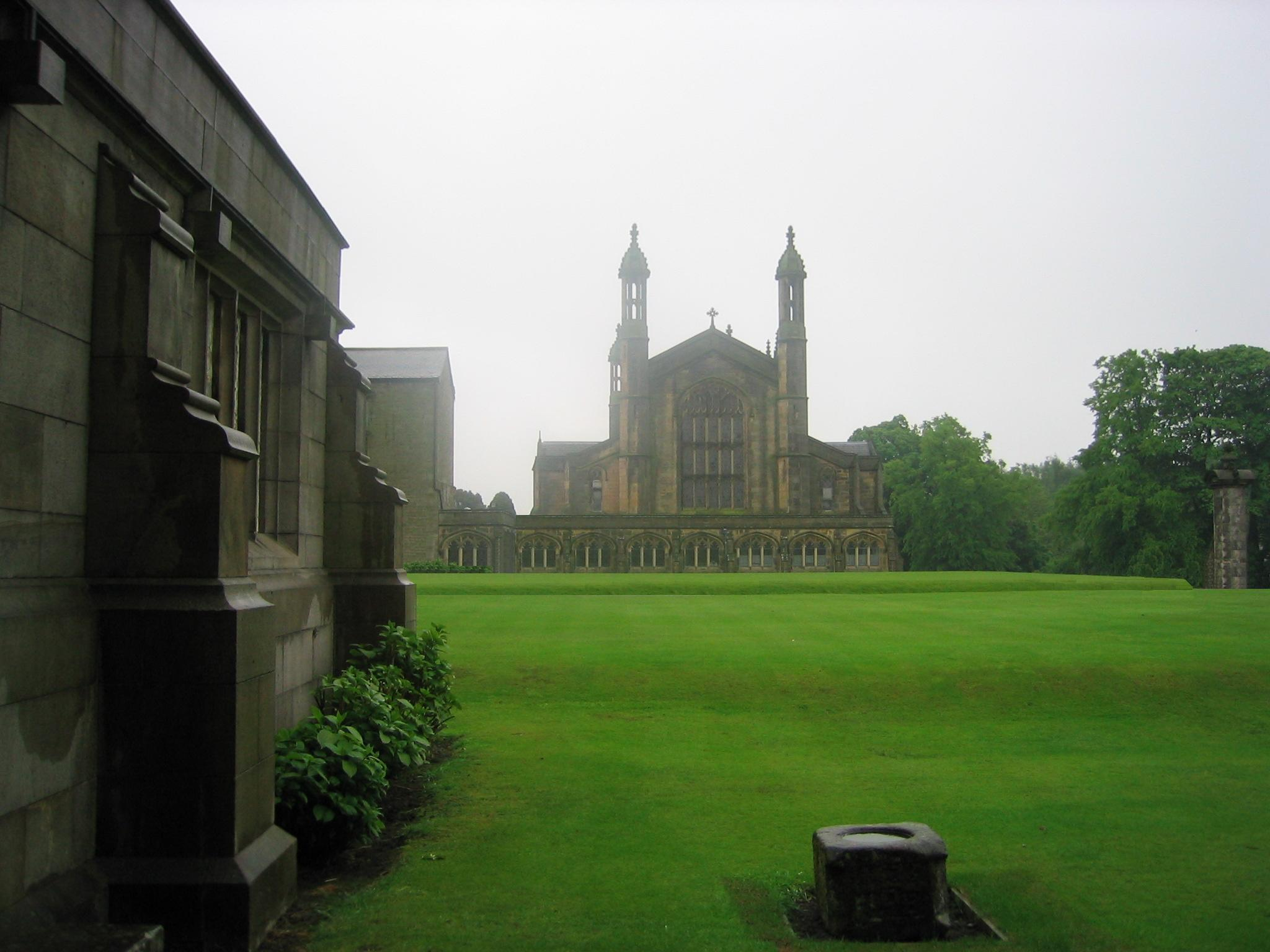
St Peter's Church viewed from the Old Infirmary.

=== 1794–1980s ===
When Clifford and his fellow pupils of Liège first arrived at Stonyhurst Hall, the buildings were in an extremely bad state of disrepair, and a temporary structure was built next to the east wing to house the boys. This "temporary" building still exists, and is known as Shirk.

A number of other buildings were added in the early 19th century, including the new church of St Peter's, in the Gothic style of the chapel at King's College, Cambridge.

By the 1880s new building works began on the school, including removal of the grand stairs in the quad and subsequently the west wing. The temporary structures of 'Shirk' and the new west wing served the school well, but by late 19th century it needed to expand again and work was started on the south front, including the building of the Boys Chapel and the Academy Room. The south front took a considerable amount of time to build, because much of the land was swamp, resulting in the need for deeper foundations, which also created extra space. The work began in 1876 to replace the Old Playground front of 1809; the total cost of the construction (minus architect's fees) was £123,205.5s.6d. (less than the cost of refurbishing the dormitories in the same building 130 years later).

Stonyhurst was notable for its scientific activities, including the meteorological records of the Observatory (built in 1838). The school also prided itself on producing gentlemen philosophers: philosophers was the term used for students pursuing a course of education above secondary level at a time when Catholics were forbidden from attending Oxford or Cambridge both by English law and also by a Papal prohibition. Gas lighting was another early technological innovation at the school during this period, and the school had its own power station.

From the 1960s onwards, the Stonyhurst went through a number of changes, partly reflecting those in the Catholic Church after the Second Vatican Council, but also attributable in part to the growing secular tone of British society. The number of Jesuit instructors fell steadily, reflecting the changed priorities of Catholic religious orders and the dwindling numbers of the English Jesuit province. These changes led to the closing of another Jesuit boys' public school, Beaumont College, in 1966; Beaumont and Stonyhurst amalgamated. With the addition of these new pupils, Stonyhurst had to expand again and the New Wing was built beside the wing erected in the 1800s to house the Arundell Library.

The former preparatory school to Beaumont College, St John's Beaumont School continues to send a significant number of its leavers to Stonyhurst.

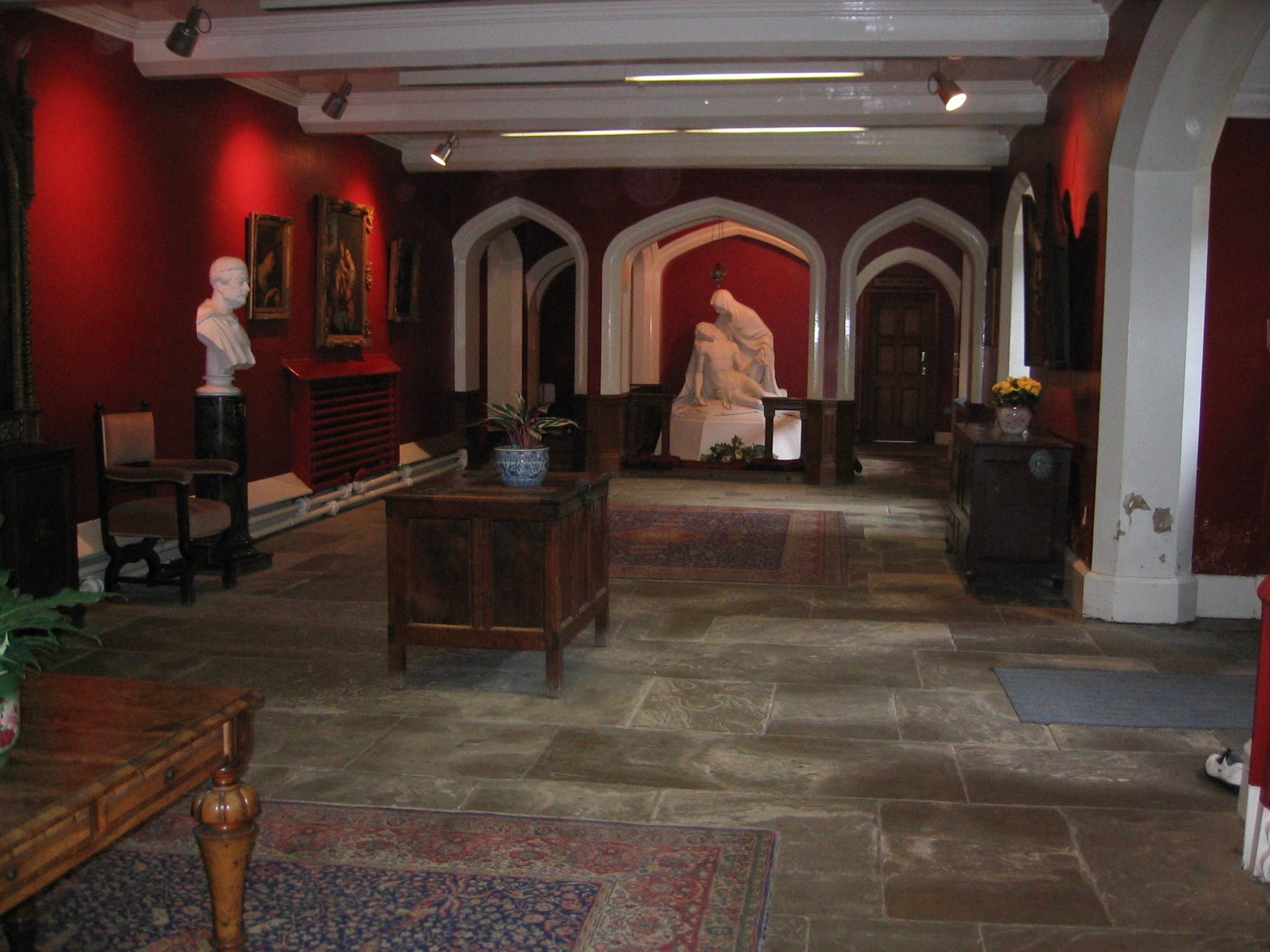
The Pieta Gallery, in the original Hall.

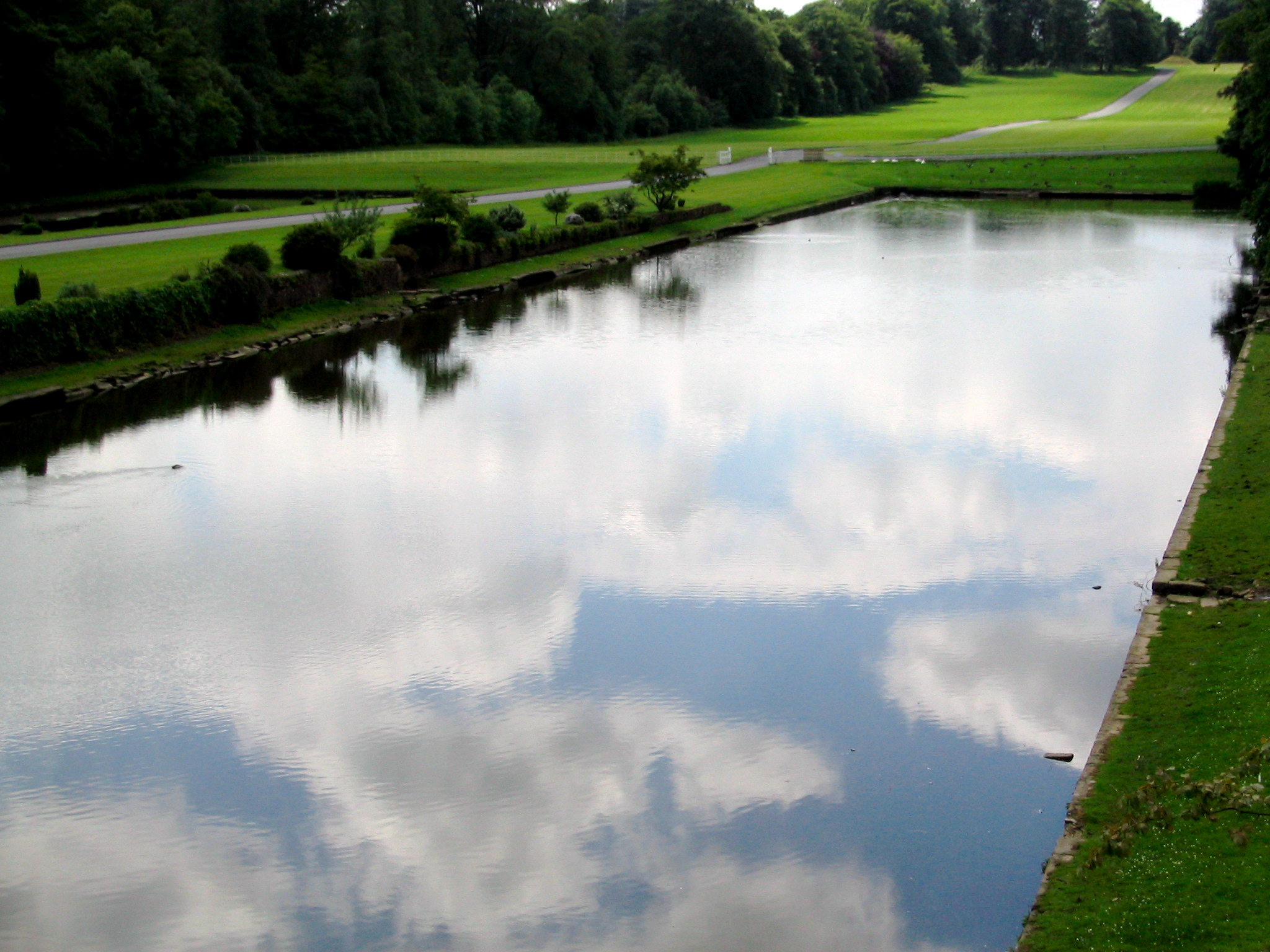
The Infirmary pond.

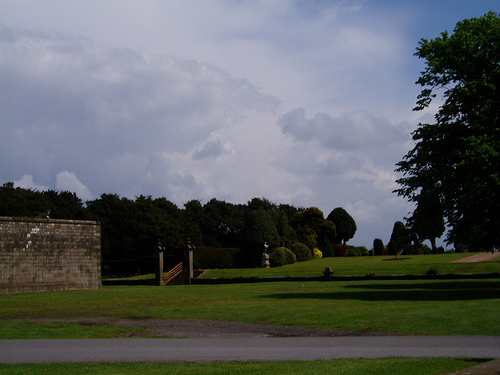
Gardens built by Sir Nicholas Shireburn, behind the Stonyhurst Football field.

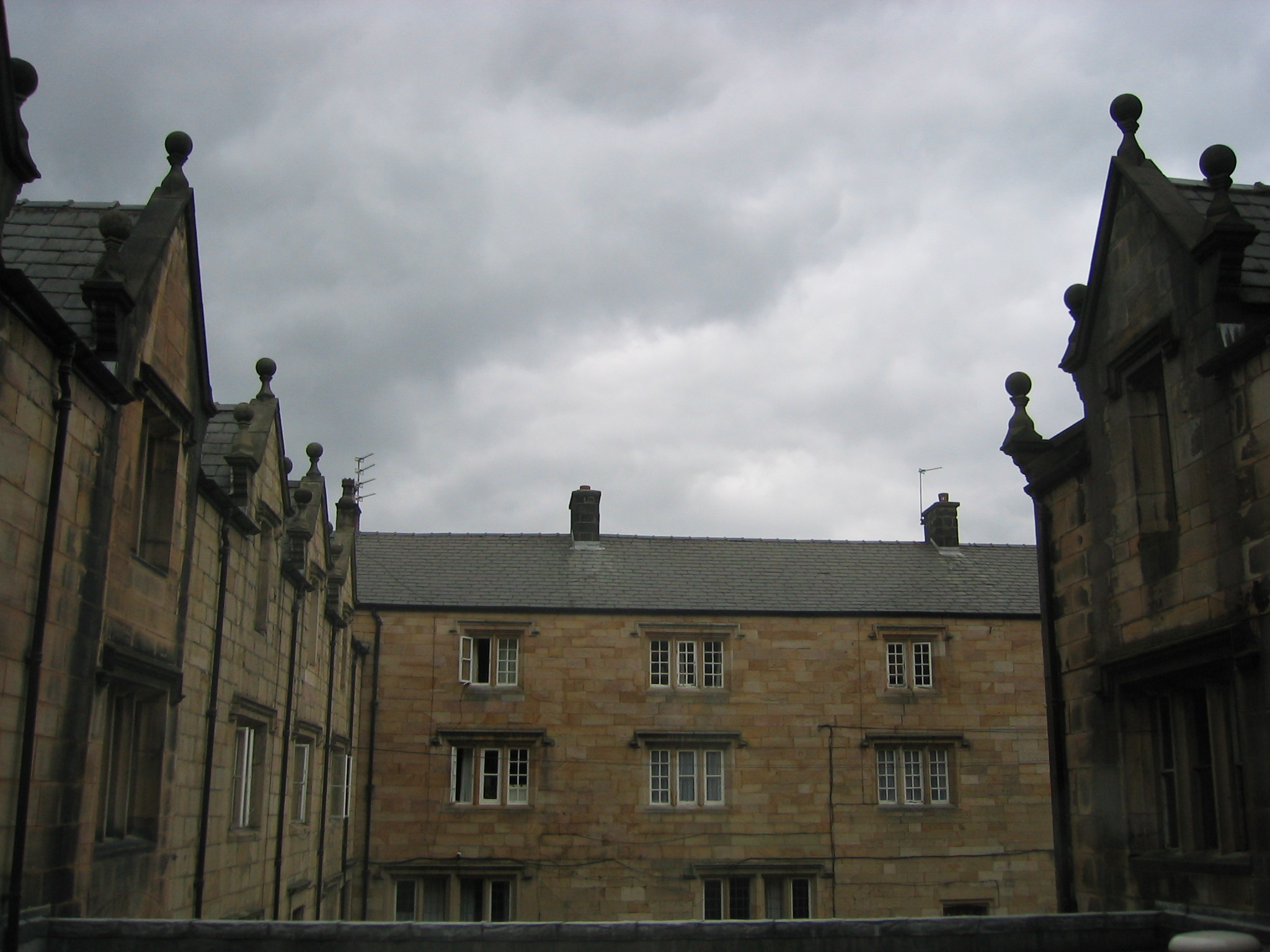
The Shireburn Quadrangle.

=== 1986–2006 ===
After Fr Michael Bossy's fifteen-year headmastership, in 1986 the college acquired its first lay headmaster, Giles Mercer. Mercer brought in a number of changes during his time, and developed particular areas of the school. By the end of the 1980s, the school opened a new indoor swimming pool, new squash courts, a new gym and various refurbished classrooms and playrooms. Scenes from the film Three Men and a Little Lady were shot at the college.

In 1993, the school celebrated 400 years since its foundation at Saint-Omer, and in 1994 200 years since its foundation at Stonyhurst Hall. Mercer set up the Centenaries appeal to raise money for new building works, including the refurbishment of the science laboratories, the Bread rooms (now English department classrooms), the language classrooms, the Ambulacrum (sports hall) and numerous other areas. The appeal also went towards building the new Centenaries Theatre. As part of the celebrations a play written by Fr William Hewett SJ was performed at the new theatre outlining the history of Stonyhurst.

Adrian Aylward succeeded Mercer in 1996, and the school continued to flourish during his ten-year leadership. In 1997, Stonyhurst began its run-up to becoming fully co-educational, and introduced girls to the preparatory school, St Mary's Hall. A building project was undertaken, such that by the time of Aylward's departure as headmaster refurbishment had taken place in the following areas of the school: the Old Infirmary (converted from girls' to Jesuit community accommodation), Lower Grammar, Grammar and Higher Line Playrooms, all dormitories (cubicles replaced by rooms on two storeys), the plunge (converted into dormitories and changing rooms on two storeys), the Sodality Chapel (restored), the Top Refectory, the Do Room, the Long Room, the Bayley Room, the More Library, the Syntax Wing and the shooting range. Five I.T. suites were created, CCTV was installed at all entrances, some disguised as Victorian lamp-posts, the back of the building outside the music basement was tidied up, and new landscaping and redesign of the road layout accompanied the building of the all-weather sports pitch on Harry Meadow. Classrooms were re-decorated and renamed after Saints associated with the school. At the same time, academic standards improved, with Oxbridge entry standing at around 10% in 2003. On a point of principle, Aylward withdrew Stonyhurst from academic league tables, claiming that they were of little relevance and devalued the worth of the individual. The Stonyhurst Access Appeal was set up in 2003 to widen access to the college to those from lower-income families and to generate funds for further redevelopment. Adrian Aylward also steered the school through a difficult investigation into claims of alleged child abuse said to have taken place in the 1970s. In 2005, after ten years, Aylward announced his resignation from June 2006. Andrew Johnson succeeded Aylward in September 2006.

=== 2006–Present ===
As headmaster, Andrew Johnson has presided over continued alterations to the building. A new spiritual centre (the Emmaus Centre) has opened adjoining the Do Room, the Sodality Chapel has been re-dedicated, and most recently the Campion Room has been converted into a new study centre. The school has returned to the league tables as Johnson works to improve the school's academic standing. New procedures have been put in place to support and prepare Oxbridge applicants, and a new mentoring system established. Extra-curricular activities have been increased, particularly with a view to community-based work, such as the "Arrupe Programme". Johnson also inspired the renaming of Saint Mary's Hall to Stonyhurst Saint Mary's Hall, and is encouraging the prep school's doubling in size. Johnson is keen to transform Stonyhurst's academic performance as well as its standing, focusing on the quality of teaching, and moving the school towards greater academic selection.

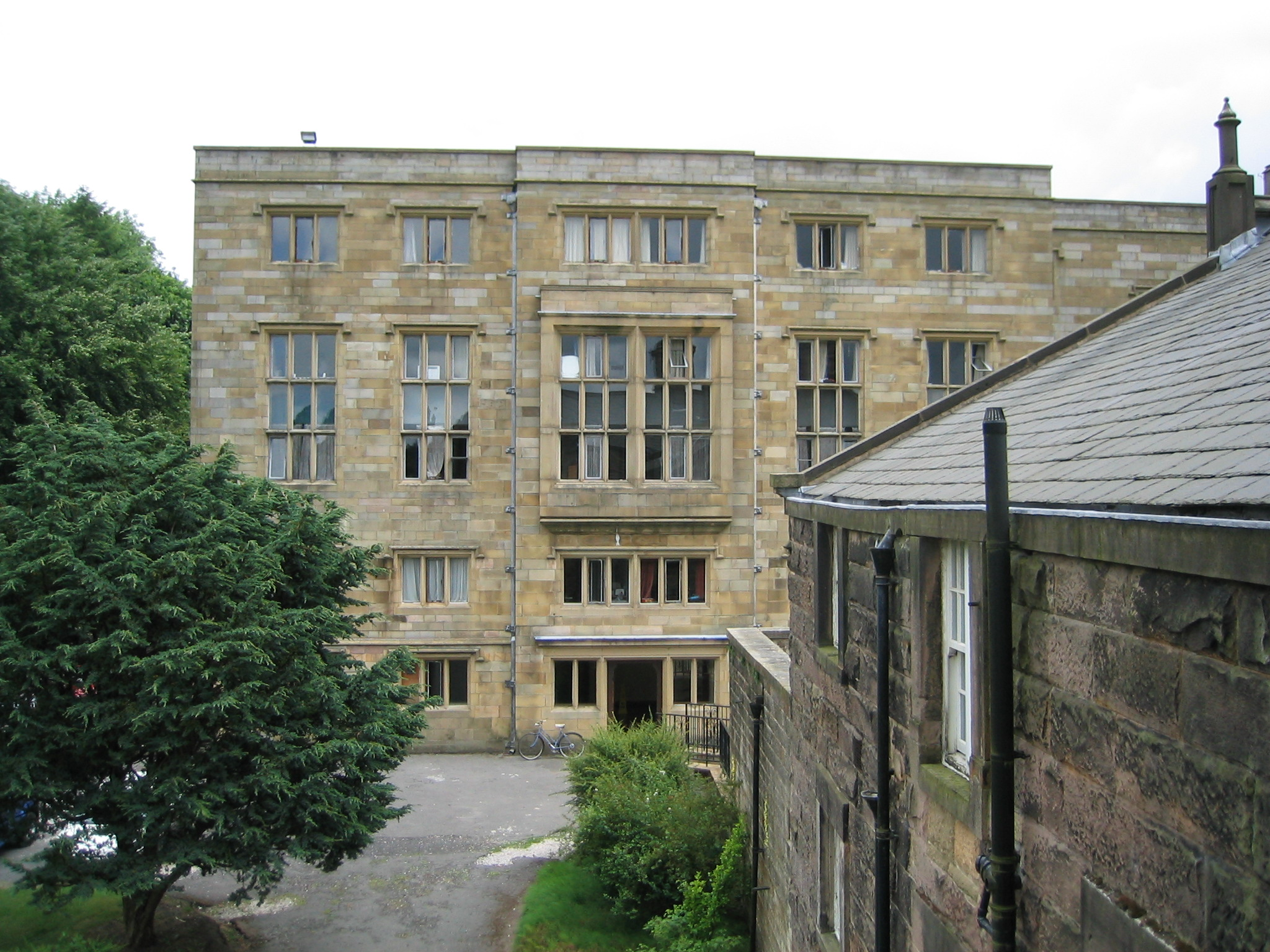
New Wing, begun in 1959.

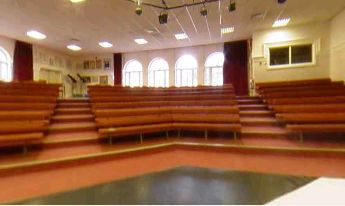
Centenaries Theatre, St Mary's Hall, Stonyhurst, built in 1993.

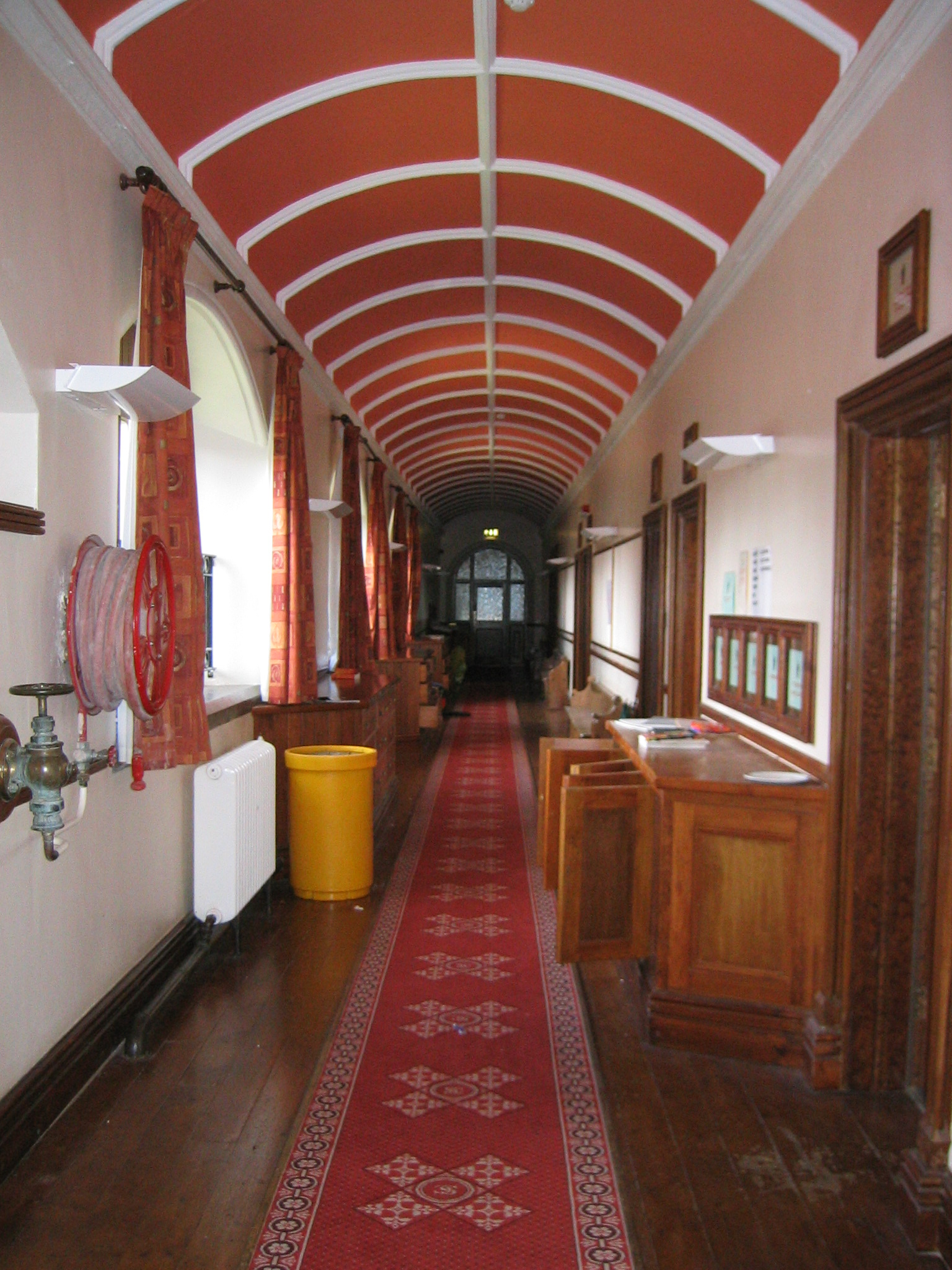
Top floor, Syntax Wing, 2003.

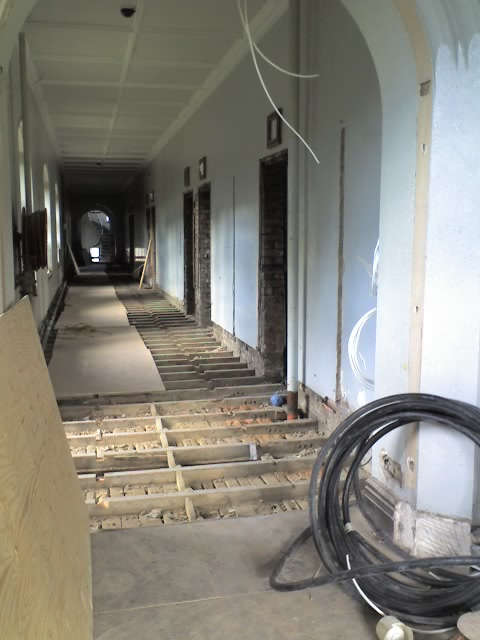
Refurbishment of the second floor of Syntax Wing, 2006.

== Local centre ==
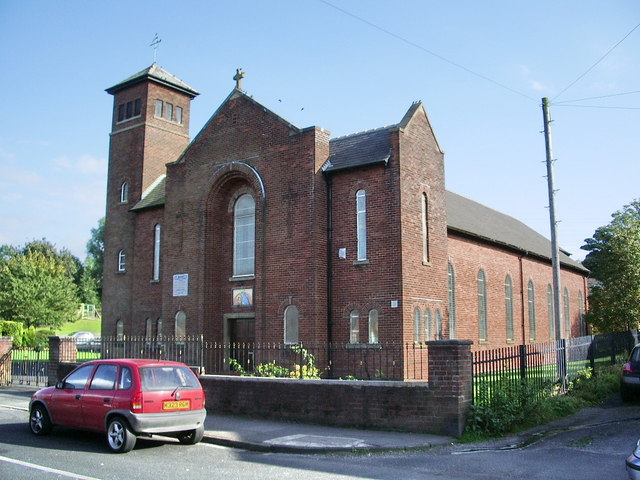
St Mary's Church, Clayton-le-Moors, founded by the Jesuits from Stonyhurst

=== Parishes ===
During the 19th century, Stonyhurst was a leading Jesuit centre. In 1794, it was the only Jesuit college in the country. From Stonyhurst, the Jesuits would travel to the Catholics in the surrounding towns to say Mass. Over time, churches were built for the Catholics in those places. The Jesuit priests from Stonyhurst built St Mary's Church in Clayton-le-Moors in 1810, St Ignatius Church, Preston in 1833, St Stephen's Church, Skipton in 1836, St Francis Xavier Church, Liverpool in 1840, the St Walburge's Preston in 1854, both Our Lady Immaculate and St Joseph Church, Prescot and Sacred Heart Church, Blackpool in 1857, Holy Cross Church, St Helens in 1860, St Joseph and St Francis Xavier Church, Richmond in 1866, Sacred Heart Church in Accrington in 1869 and Church of St Mary, Lowe House in 1924.

=== Clayton-le-Moors and Accrington ===
From 1810 to 1873, the Jesuits served the Catholics in Clayton-le-Moors from St Mary's Church, until they handed over the administration of the church over to the Diocese of Salford who continue to serve the parish.

The Jesuits arrived in Accrington in 1852 to start a mission and dedicated the parish to Oswald of Northumbria. In 1869, a church was built on Blackburn Road and was dedicated to the Sacred Heart instead. On 5 August 1869 the church was opened by the first Bishop of Salford, William Turner. In 1931, the parish needed expansion and Our Lady's Chapel was built in Huncoat. In 1958, the Jesuits handed over the administration of the church to the Diocese of Salford. In June 2003, the church was closed. Later that year, it was damaged in a fire and then demolished.

== See also ==
- Stonyhurst Estate
- Hodder Place
- List of Old Stonyhursts
- Stonyhurst Gospel
- St Ignatius, founder of the Jesuits
- St Aloysius Gonzaga, patron saint
- St Gordianus, interred in the school
- Forest of Bowland

== Sources ==
- Chadwick, Hubert, S.J. (1962). St Omers to Stonyhurst, Burns & Oats. No ISBN
- Walsh, R.R. (1989) Stonyhurst War Record
- Muir, T.E. (1992). Stonyhurst College 1593-1993, James & James (Publishers) Ltd. ISBN 0-907383-32-7
- Kirby, Henry L. and Walsh, R.Raymond (1987). The Seven V.C.s of Stonyhurst College, T.H.C.L. Books. ISBN 0-948494-04-2
- The Authorities of Stonyhurst College (1963), A Stonyhurst Handbook for Visitors and Others, Third edition
- Hewitson, A. (Preston, 1878), Stonyhurst College, Present and Past: Its History, Discipline, Treasures and Curiosities, Second edition
- Stonyhurst College website
