= St Peter's Church, Stonyhurst =

St Peter's Church
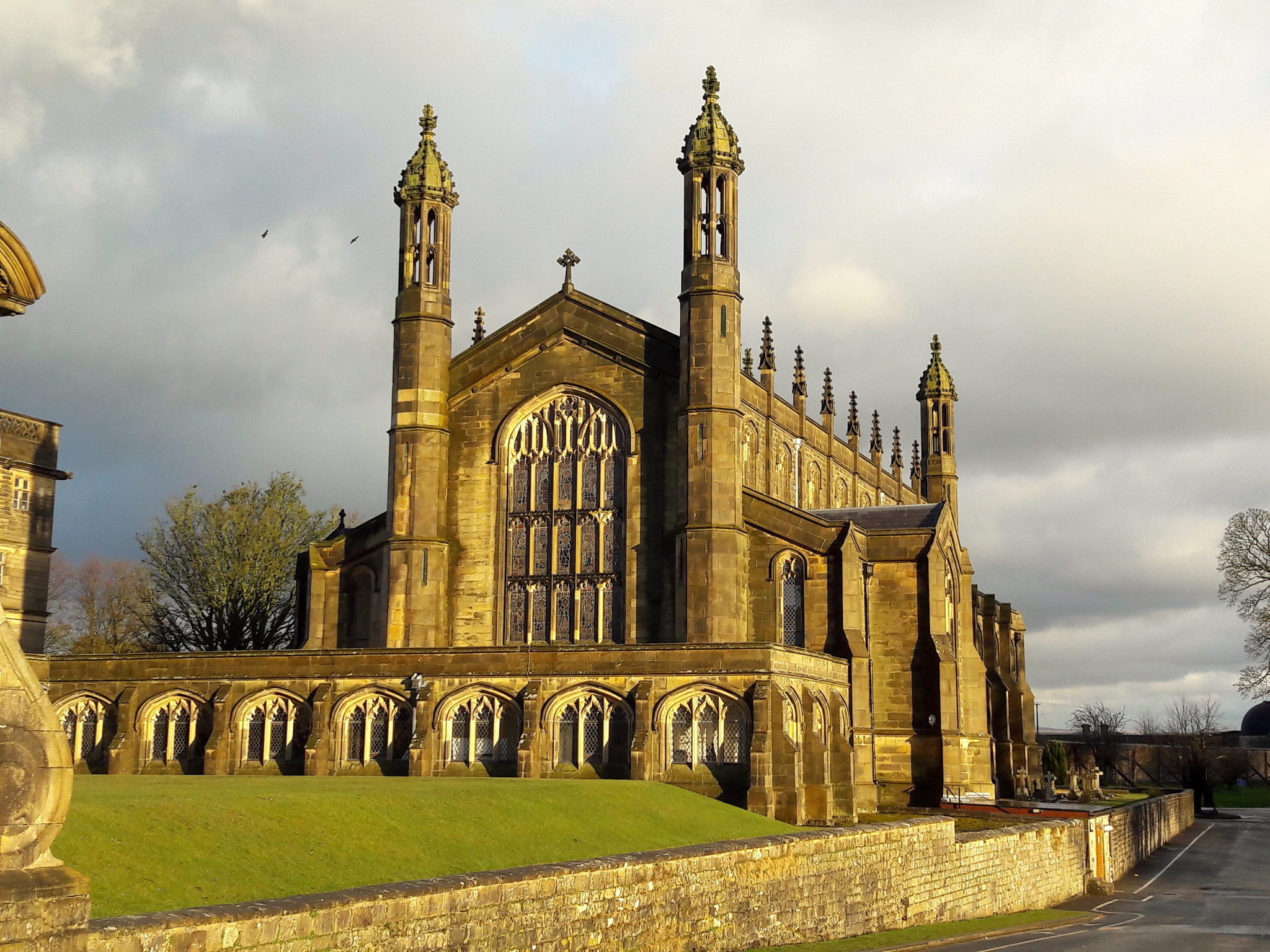
- St Peter's Church
- 53.8461°N 2.4723°W
- OS grid reference: SD 69021 38978
- Location: Stonyhurst
- Country: England
- Denomination: Roman Catholic
- Religious institute: Society of Jesus
- Website: stpetersstonyhurst.org.uk

History
- Status: Parish church
- Founded: 1835
- Dedication: Saint Peter
- Consecrated: 23 June 1835

Architecture
- Functional status: Active
- Heritage designation: Grade I listed
- Designated: 14 January 2015
- Architect: Joseph John Scoles
- Style: Gothic Revival
- Groundbreaking: 1832
- Completed: 1835

Administration
- Province: Liverpool
- Diocese: Salford
- Deanery: St John Southworth, Blackburn
- Parish: St Peter's & St Joseph's

St Peter's Church is a Roman Catholic Parish Church in Stonyhurst. It is the parish church for Hurst Green, Lancashire and a chapel for Stonyhurst College. It was built from 1832 to 1835 and designed by Joseph John Scoles in the Gothic Revival style. It was founded by the Society of Jesus and has been served by Jesuit priests since. It is a Grade I listed building.

== History ==
=== Foundation ===
During the Reformation, the Stonyhurst Estate was owned by the Catholic Shireburn baronets. In 1794, during the French Revolution, the Jesuit College of St Omer had to flee France and was invited to Stonyhurst by Thomas Weld. The school was re-established in Stonyhurst, and became a place of worship and education for the local Catholic community. From Stonyhurst, Jesuits travelled to other local Catholic communities to say Mass and eventually built churches in those places such as in Preston, Skipton, St Helens and Richmond.

Originally, the local chapel was on the site of a former stable. However, with the expanding size of the college and local community, a new church had to be built.

=== Construction ===
In 1832, construction work on the church began. It was designed by the architect Joseph John Scoles who would go on to build St Ignatius, Preston in 1835, St James the Less and St Helen Church, Colchester in 1837, Cardiff Cathedral in 1842, and Immaculate Conception, Farm Street and St Francis Xavier's, Liverpool both in 1844. King's College Chapel in Cambridge was the inspiration for the design of the church. On 23 June 1835, the church was consecrated by Bishop John Briggs, Vicar Apostolic of the Northern District.

In 1837, Augustus Pugin visited Stonyhurst. In the 1850s several alterations were made to the church. Windows, designed by Pugin, were installed and the interior was refurbished according to the designs of Frederick Settle Barff.

=== Developments ===
In 2011, a refurbishment of the church was completed. A permanent marble altar was installed. The frescos and wooden fittings were all repaired and cleaned. The altar replaced a timber one that was given to the Church of St Vincent de Paul in Liverpool.

In 2019, the statue of Saint Mary, a replica of the Column of the Immaculate Conception in Rome, was returned to the college after a year-long renovation costing £80,000. It stands at the entrance to the college on the road to the church.

== Parish ==
The church serves both as a chapel for Stonyhurst College and as the parish church for the village of Hurst Green. The other church in the parish is the chapel of St Joseph in St Joseph's Roman Catholic Primary School. The parish three Sunday Masses, 5:30pm on Saturday in St Peter's Church, 9:30am on Sunday at St Joseph's Chapel and at 11:00am in St Peter's Church.

== See also ==
- Diocese of Salford
- Stonyhurst Saint Mary's Hall
- Grade I listed churches in Lancashire
- Listed buildings in Aighton, Bailey and Chaigley
- List of Jesuit sites in the United Kingdom
- List of Catholic churches in the United Kingdom
