= St Mary's Church, Great Yarmouth =

Coordinates: 52°36′27″N 1°44′0.7″E

St Mary Church
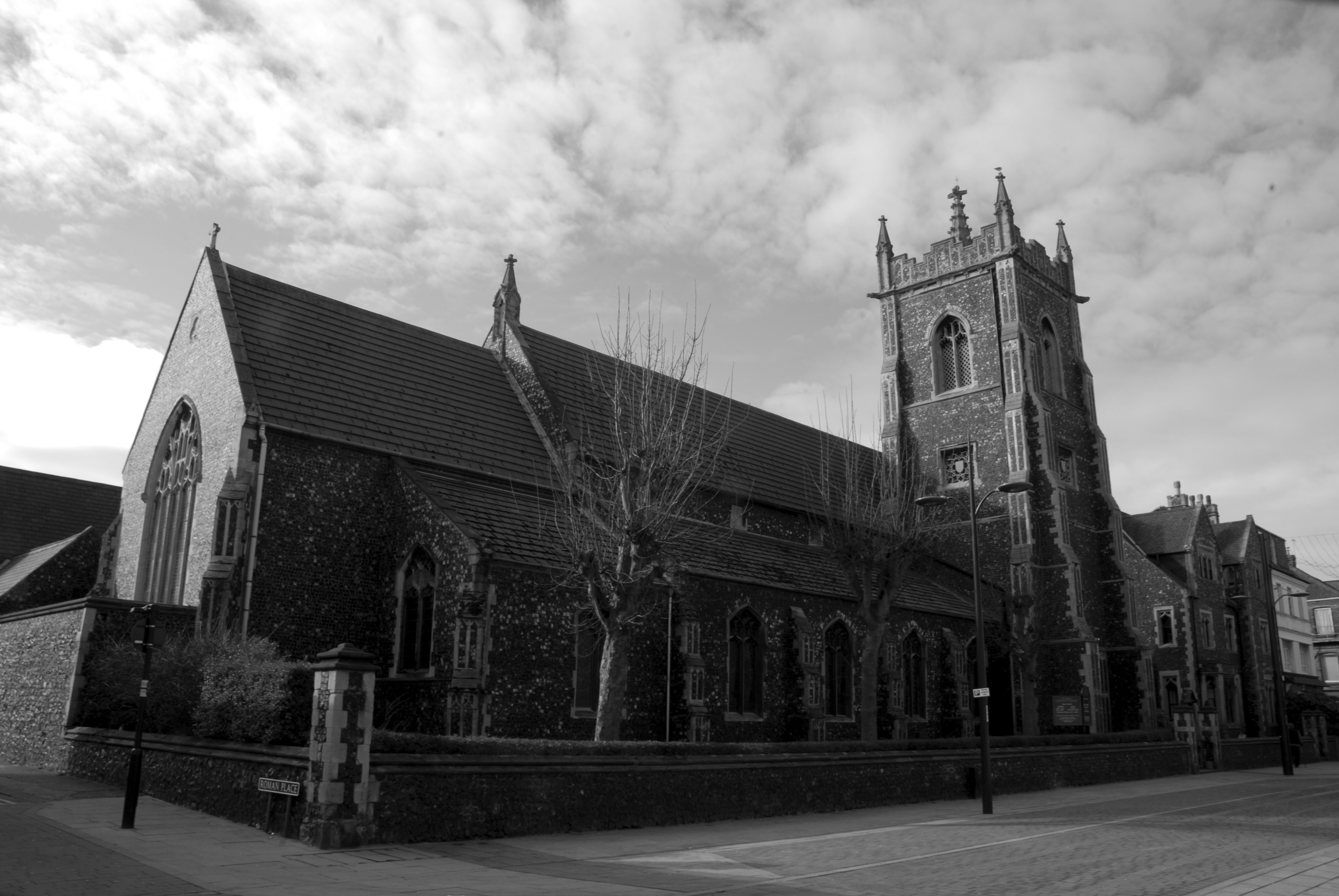
- Exterior

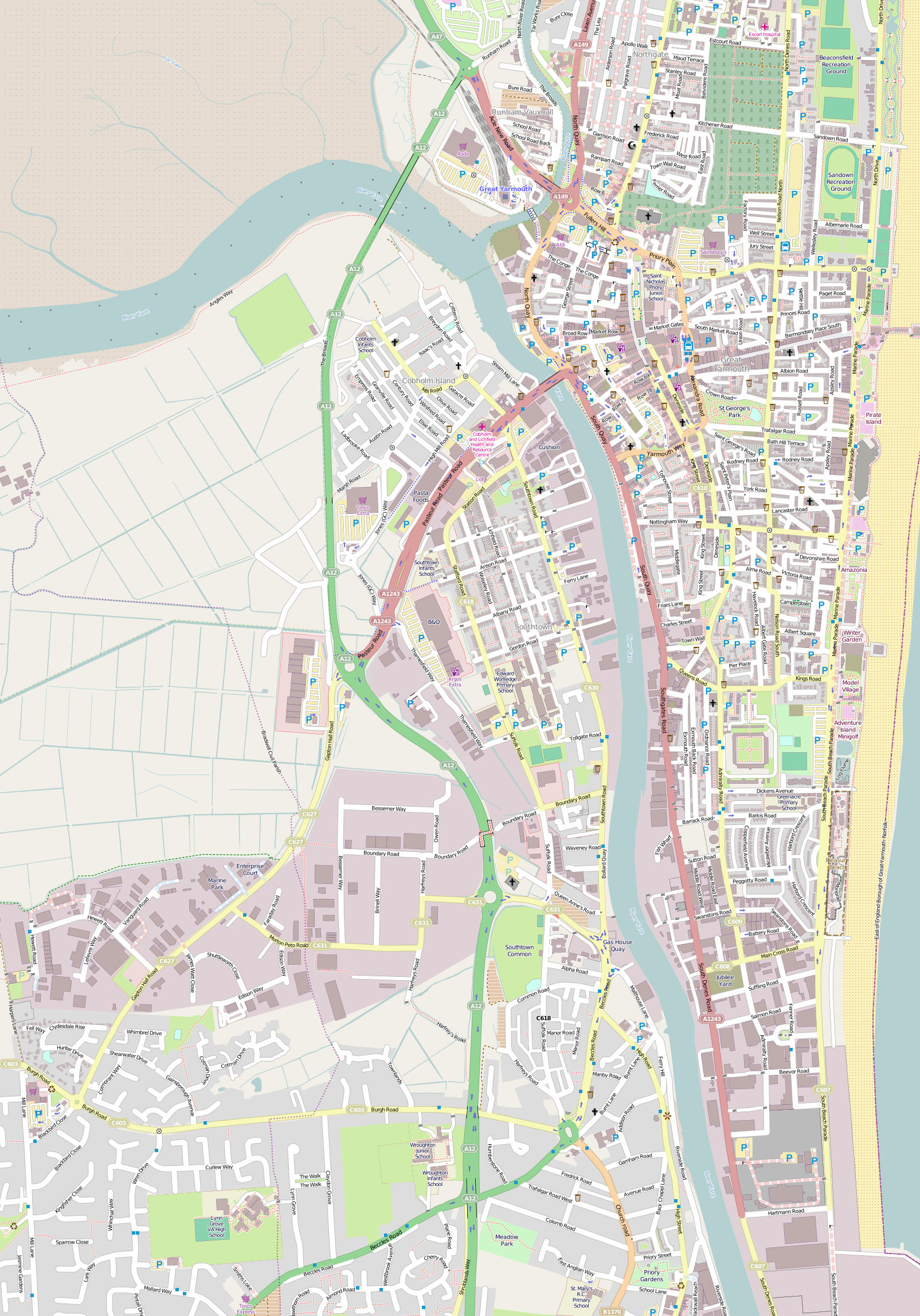
- Location in Great Yarmouth
- OS grid reference: TG 52896 07634
- Location: Great Yarmouth
- Country: England
- Denomination: Roman Catholic
- Website: StMarysGY.org.uk

History
- Status: Parish church
- Founder: Society of Jesus
- Dedication: St Mary

Architecture
- Functional status: Active
- Heritage designation: Grade II* listed
- Architect: Joseph John Scoles
- Style: Gothic Revival
- Groundbreaking: 1848
- Completed: September 1850
- Construction cost: £10,000

Administration
- Province: Westminster
- Diocese: East Anglia
- Deanery: Coastal

Clergy
- Bishop: Rt. Rev. Peter Collins
- Priest: Fr Anthony Nwankwo SMMM Fr Alvan Ibeh SMMM Fr Alex Ibe SMMM

St Mary's Church is a Roman Catholic Parish church in Great Yarmouth, Norfolk. It is situated on Regent Road in the centre of the town. It was originally built by the Society of Jesus in the late 1840s and it is now administered by the Diocese of East Anglia. The architect was Joseph John Scoles who also designed the Anglican St Mary's church in the Southtown area of Great Yarmouth and it is a Grade II* listed building.

It is listed on the Heritage at Risk Register with a Priority Grade of F, indicating that a repair scheme is in progress and, where applicable, an end use or user has been identified, or that the building is functionally redundant, with a new use agreed but not yet implemented.

== History ==
=== Foundation ===
In 1824, the Jesuits started a mission in the town for the Catholics of the area. It began under a Fr Tate. Originally, he purchased a house and warehouse in the town for the congregation to worship in. However, by 1841, the congregation had become too numerous and a new larger location had to be sought. Fr Tate's replacement, Fr Lopez, bought the land for St Mary's and construction started in 1848.

=== Construction ===
The church was completed two years later and it was opened by the Bishop of Northampton, William Wareing on 24 September 1850. The architect was Joseph John Scoles who designed numerous churches for the Jesuits, such as Immaculate Conception Church, Farm Street in London, St Francis Xavier Church in Liverpool, St Ignatius Church in Preston and Holy Cross Church in St Helens. In Great Yarmouth, he also designed the Bure Bridge in 1829 and the Anglican church in Southtown in 1831, which is also dedicated to St Mary. Despite the Bure Bridge collapsing on 2 May 1845 (because construction workers made the bridge wider than specified), Joseph Scoles was still invited back to the town to design St Mary's church. In 1962 the Jesuits left Great Yarmouth and handed the church over to the Diocese of East Anglia. From 1972 to 1995, the Augustinians served parish before it was again handed back to the diocese, who have remained there ever since.

=== Interior ===
The church has stained glass windows from Franz Mayer & Co. installed in 1860 and 1890 as well as glass by Hardman & Co. in Birmingham, installed in the 1850s. The church organ was installed in the 19th century and has 1032 pipes.

=== News ===
On Tuesday during holy week, 29 March 2018, the church was a victim of a hate crime when an arsonist started several small fires in the church and left a picture of the devil on the altar. The church remained open for the Easter weekend and the altar was rededicated on 31 May 2018.

== Parish ==
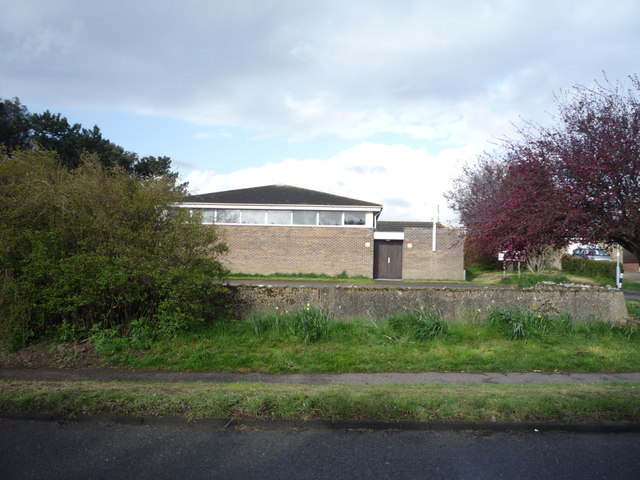
St Ignatius Church, Caister-on-Sea

Within the parish is St Ignatius of Loyola Church in Caister-on-Sea. It was built in the 1960s. In 1965, the diocese bought the land, commissioned the architects Wearing & Hastings, and built the church two years later. The church was dedicated to the founder of the Jesuits in recognition for their local contribution.

The parish has a close relationship with the nearby St Mary's Primary School. The school was founded for the children of local Catholic families, and now it accepts children from all faiths and communities.

The parish is the main Catholic church for Great Yarmouth and has Masses at 10:00 on Saturday and at 11:00 on Sunday.

== See also ==
- Diocese of East Anglia
- Media related to St Mary's, Great Yarmouth at Wikimedia Commons
