= Merrick Farran =

British composer, arranger and violinist (1906–1991)

William Merrick Farran (14 January 1906 – 26 November 1991) (sometimes credited as William Farran), was a London-born composer, conductor, arranger and violinist.

Farran was educated at Stonyhurst Castle. He won a scholarship to the Manchester Royal College of Music to study violin and composition, and claimed to have had composition lessons from E. J Moeran (though Moeran is not known for his teaching). As an orchestral player he toured America with Sir Thomas Beecham and the Royal Philharmonic Orchestra.

He established himself as a conductor of both classical and popular music. He composed some concert works, most notably the 40 minute exotica piece Symphonic Variations On A Rock 'N Roll Theme of 1958, the theme being from 'Rock Around the Clock' and the variations orchestrated in the styles of different cultures. This was issued on a Melodisc LP in 1958 and re-issued by Trunk Music in 2016. There was also a three movement orchestral suite, Stranger in London.

In 1960 Farran met singer Matt Monro at the White Lion pub in Denmark Street and asked him to record six demonstration discs as a pitch for the BBC. Two of these tracks, 'The Ghost of Your Past' and 'Quite Suddenly', both composed and arranged by Farran, were issued by Ember Records in 1961 despite a court injunction issued by Monro's official record label EMI intended to prevent their release. The songs came out as a single and were later included on the album Matt Monro and Don Rennie.

Farran featured as conductor and arranger on several recordings with the Westminster Sinfonia in the 1960s, including the 1965 LP Mine Eyes Have Seen the Glory with the Irish tenor Brendan O'Dowda, and The Maid of the Mountains (1968), which was produced, orchestrated and conducted by Farran. From the mid-1960s he also composed library music for KPM and later for Bruton. His House of Horror music composed for Bruton was later used in TV productions such as Prisoner Cell Block H and SpongeBob SquarePants.

He died at the Acland Hospital in Oxford, aged 85, survived by his wife Maude.
