= Church of St Mary, Lowe House =

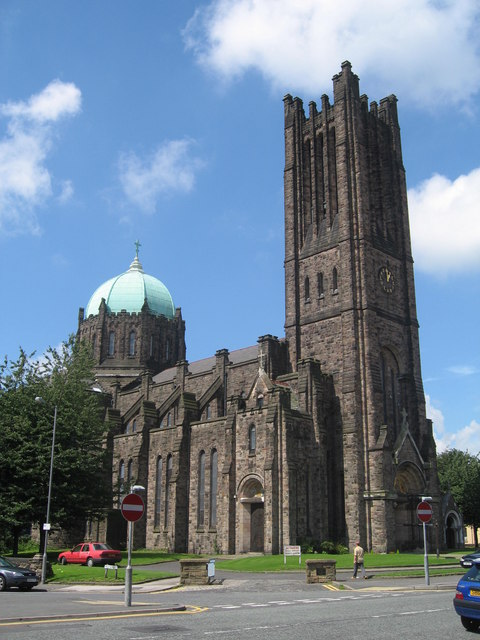
- South side of the church
- Church of St Mary, Lowe House
- 53.4571°N 2.7404°W
- OS grid reference: SJ 50935 95844
- Location: St Helens, Merseyside
- Country: England
- Denomination: Roman Catholic
- Website: stmaryslowehouse.org

History
- Status: Active
- Founded: 1924

Architecture
- Functional status: Parish church
- Heritage designation: Grade II listed
- Designated: 11 September 1951
- Architect: Charles B. Powell

Administration
- Province: Liverpool (aka Northern)
- Archdiocese: Liverpool
- Deanery: St Helens – St Monica Pastoral Area
- Parish: St Mary's and St. Thomas of Canterbury

Clergy
- Archbishop: Most Rev. Malcolm McMahon O.P.
- Priest: Rev. Michael Harwood

The Church of St Mary, Lowe House is a Roman Catholic Parish church situated on North Road in St Helens, Merseyside. The present church was founded in 1924 and staffed by the Society of Jesus until 1981. It is a Grade II listed building with Romanesque and Gothic features.

== History ==
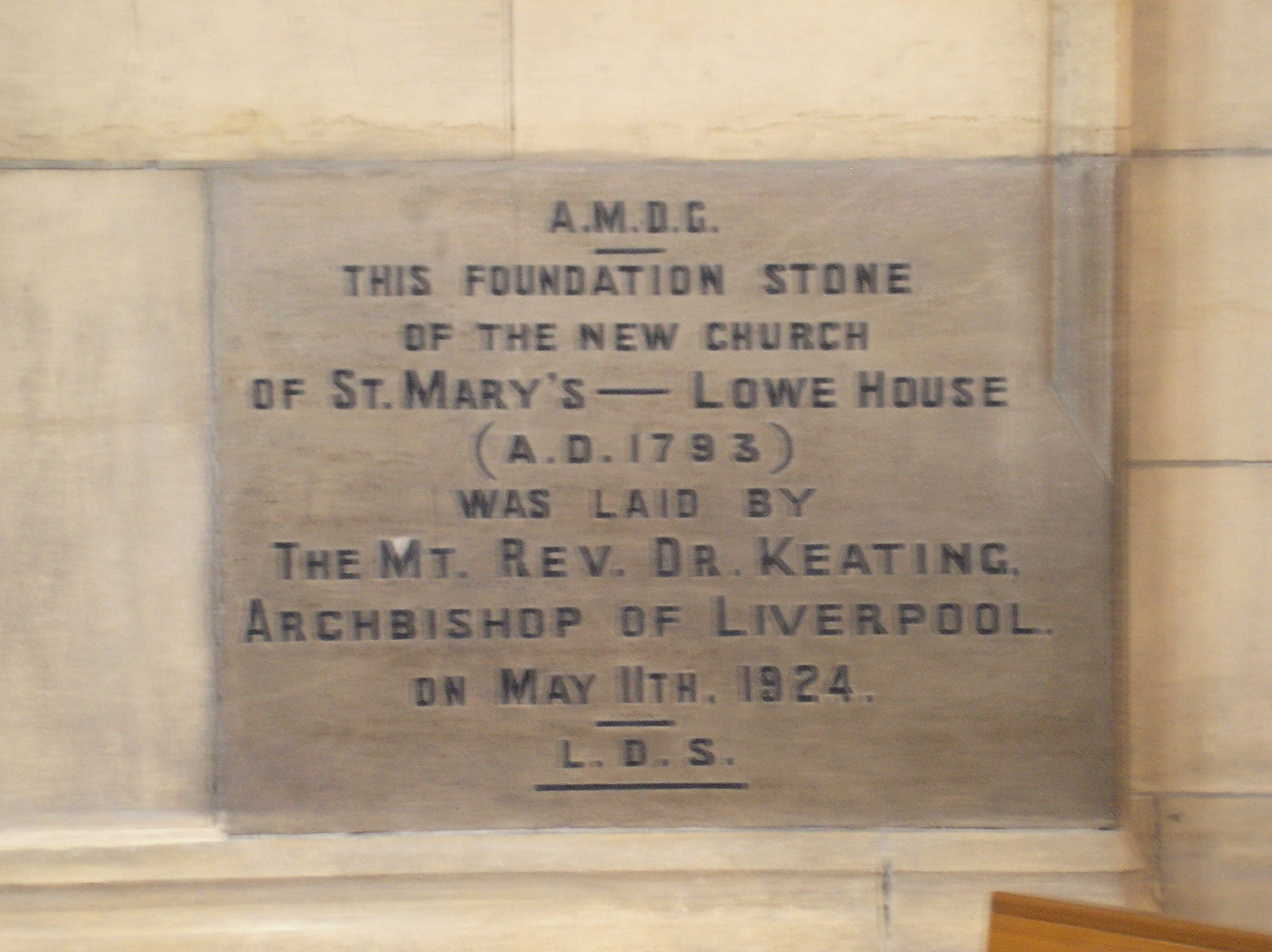
Foundation stone

=== Origin ===
The church is named St Mary's Lowe House because it was built on a piece of land gifted by Winefred Eccleston, née Lowe, near to her home on Cowley Hill. Winefred was the widow of John Gorsuch Eccleston, a former owner of Eccleston Hall that had previously provided for a Roman Catholic Chapel until later owners closed it. The first chapel was constructed and opened in 1793 and was known as Lowe House. It was enlarged three times, the final time being in 1857.

=== Foundation ===
To accommodate the growing Catholic population in the town, construction of a new church was started in 1924 by the side of the original church (which was eventually demolished in 1930). The foundation stone was laid by the Archbishop of Liverpool, Frederick Keating on 11 May 1924. The scale was decided on by Fr Reginald Riley SJ, who wanted a larger size church for the local Catholic community. He was parish priest at the church from 1912 to 1946. The church was opened in 1929, and was designed by Charles B. Powell, an Irish architect who did other architectural work for the Jesuits in Dublin. It is colloquially referred to as 'The Basilica of St Helens' and 'The Poor Man's Cathedral' by people in St Helens, because construction of the church was funded by donations from the local population during a time of economic struggle.

The dome, designed in a Romanesque crossed with Gothic style, is on the point where the nave, sanctuary and transepts meet, sitting on a castellated octagonal tower. There is a copper cross on the dome that is 16 feet high. It was given to the church by the family of a local builder, James Yearsley whose company helped lay the foundations. The clock face on the 130 ft tall tower is set in gold mosaic.

=== Carillon ===
A major feature of the clock tower is the historic Carillon (bells playable in musical notation by a keyboard, rather than in sequences by ropes). Cast and built by renowned bellfounders John Taylor & Co. of Loughborough, it is the largest in the North West of England housing 47 bells. The Carillon is regularly played and there are also occasional recitals by visiting Carillonneurs.

== Parish ==
Every week, the church has Mass every Sunday, at 11:00 am.

On 27 July 1980, the head of the Jesuits in Britain announced to the congregation that, as of Easter 1981, the church would no longer be staffed by Jesuits and would be handed over to the Archdiocese of Liverpool.

In 2010, the parish was merged with the nearby Holy Cross and St Helen parish in the centre of St Helens to become the parish of Holy Cross and St Mary. However in 2014, following changes in the archdiocese, St Mary's Lowe House was paired with the parish of St Thomas of Canterbury, Dentons Green. The church of Holy Cross & St. Helen reverted to a single parish under a new parish priest.

== Gallery ==
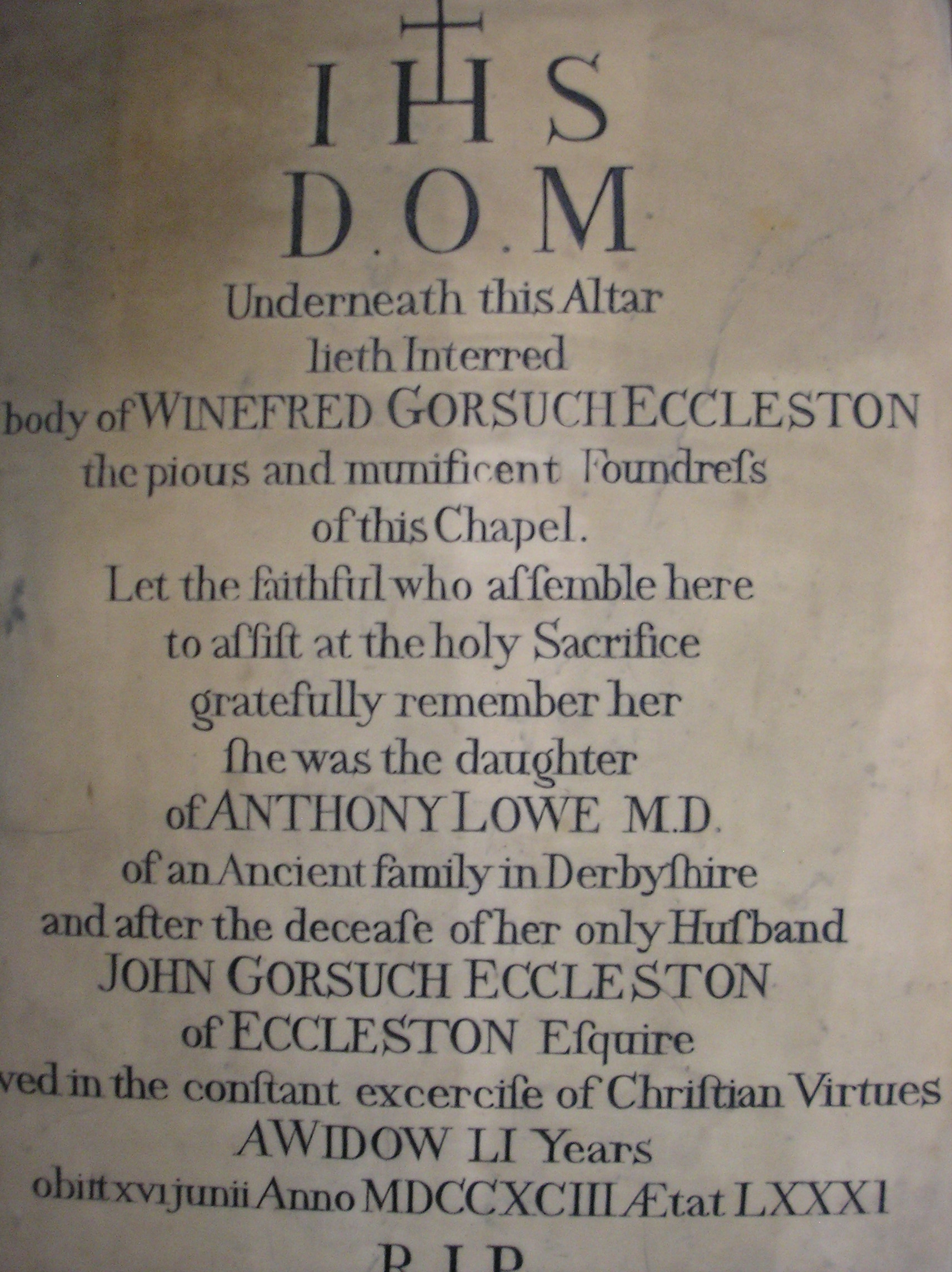
Memorial stone for Winefred Eccleston

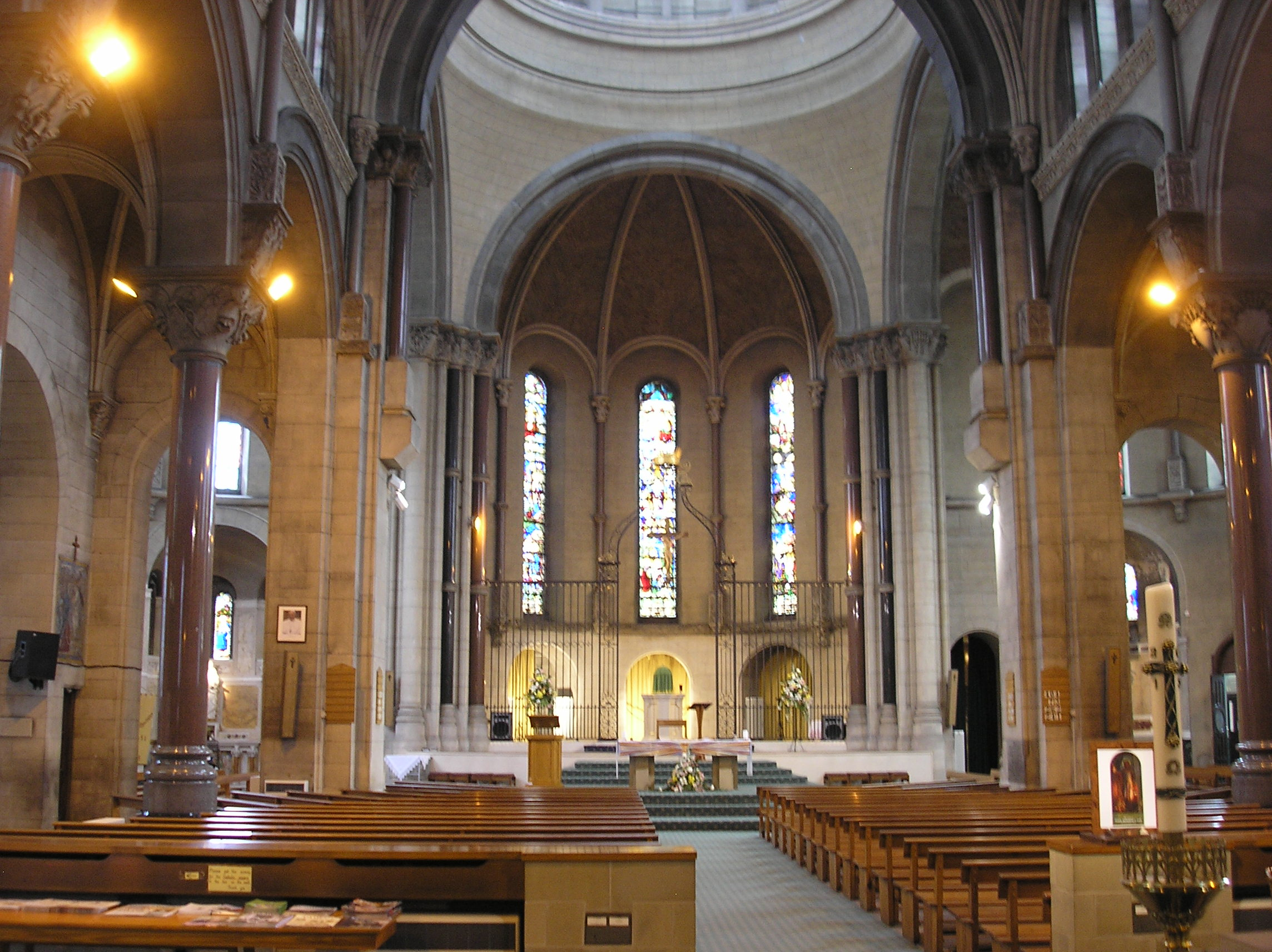
Nave

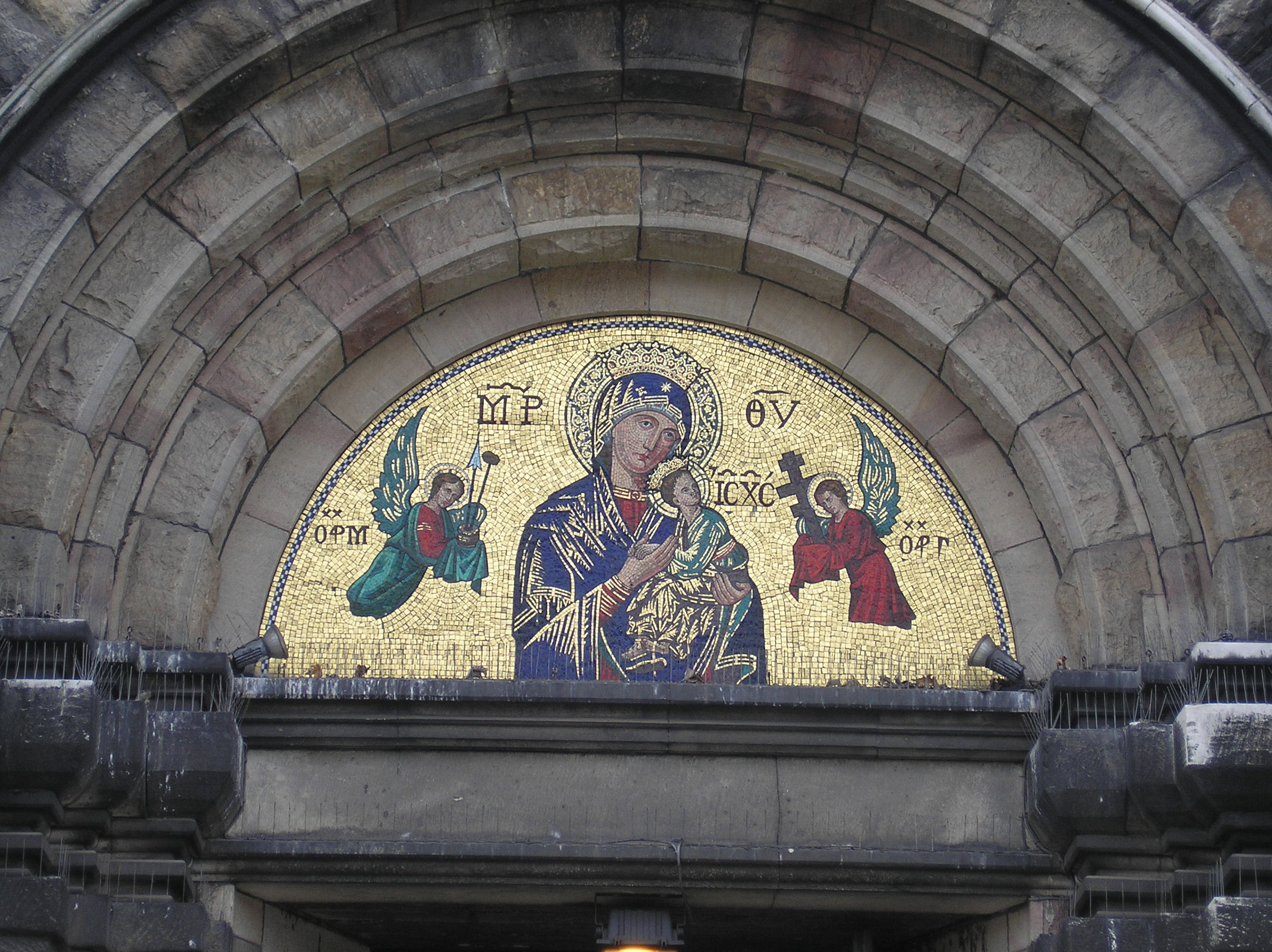
Entrance

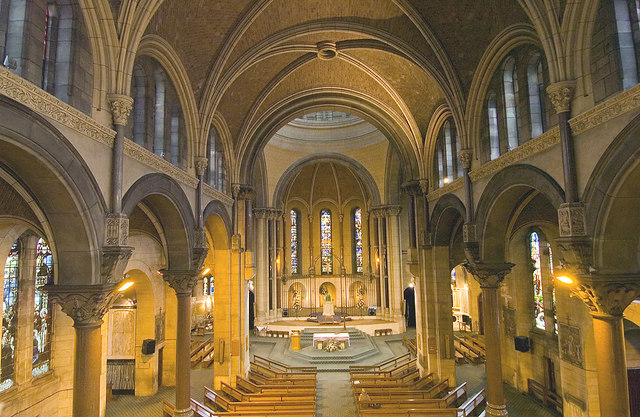
Interior

== See also ==
- Listed buildings in St Helens, Merseyside
- List of carillons of the British Isles
- 1888–1913 Overlay OS Map via National Library of Scotland showing positions of the old and present churches
