= Joseph John Scoles =

English Gothic Revival architect

Joseph John Scoles (1798–1863) was an English Gothic Revival architect, who designed many Roman Catholic churches.

== Early life and education ==
Scoles was born in London on 27 June 1798, the son of Roman Catholic parents Matthew Scoles, a joiner, and Elizabeth Sparling. He was educated at the Roman Catholic school at Baddesley Green and then, in 1812, apprenticed for seven years to his relative, Joseph Ireland, an architect who was extensively employed by John Milner, then the Roman Catholic vicar-apostolic of the Midland District. Ireland built several Roman Catholic churches, one of the earliest of which was at Hinckley, in Nottinghamshire. He was probably advised on the Gothic detailing of these designs by John Carter. Between 1816 and 1819 Scoles was resident at Hassop Hall, Bakewell, and in Leicester, superintending works for Ireland.

== Travel ==
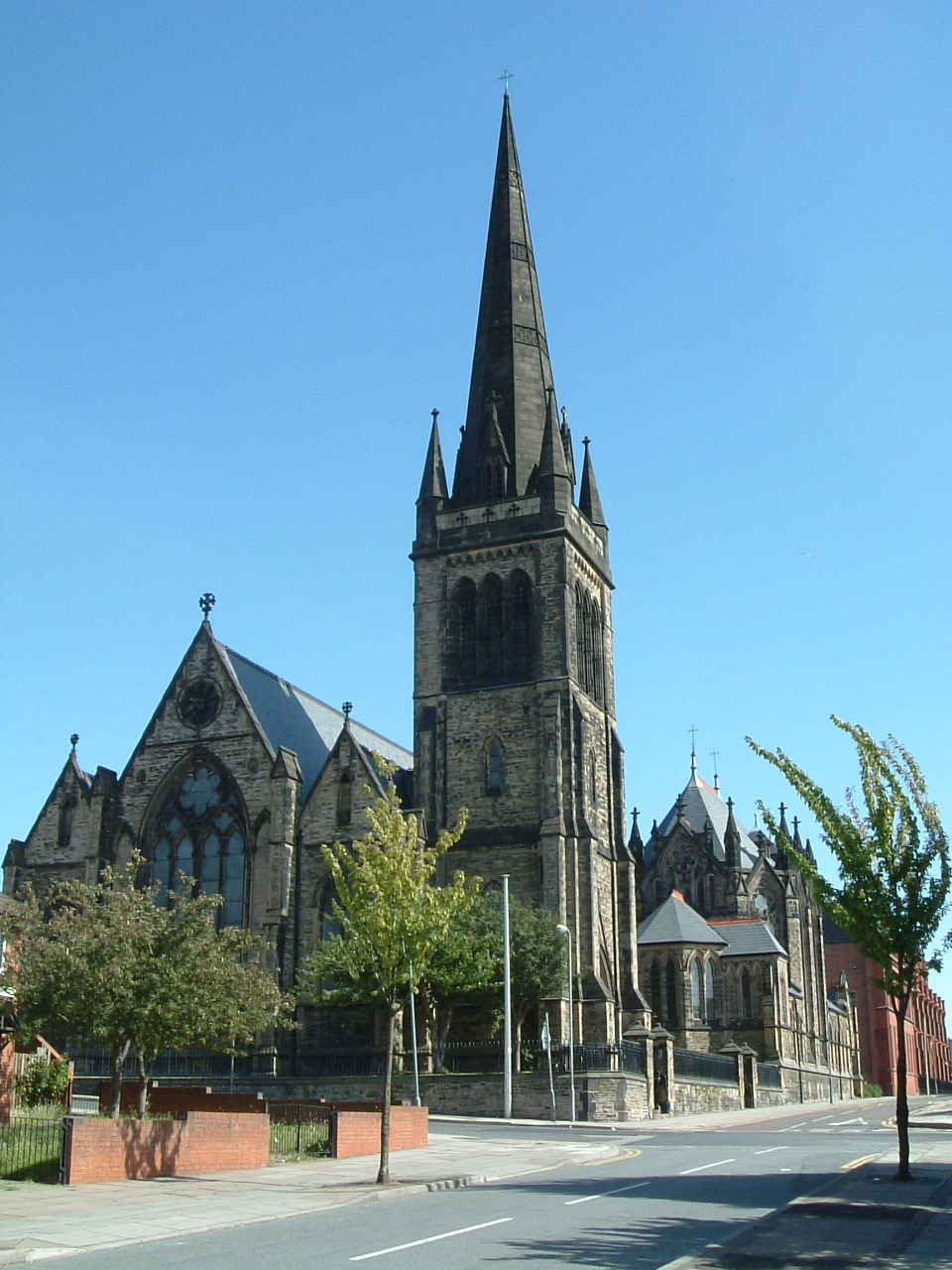
St Francis Xavier, Liverpool

In 1822 Scoles left England in the company of Joseph Bonomi the Younger for further study. He carried out archaeological and architectural research in Rome, Greece, Egypt, and Syria, often in the company of Henry Parke and Frederick Catherwood. In 1829 he published an engraved map of Nubia, showing the area between the first and second cataracts of the Nile, from a survey made in 1824 jointly by him and Parke, and a map of the city of Jerusalem; his plan of the church of the Holy Sepulchre, Jerusalem, with his drawings of the Jewish tombs in the valley of Jehoshaphat, was published by Robert Willis in 1849.

== Early secular work ==
In 1826 he returned home and resumed architectural work. In 1828 he planned and carried out the building of Gloucester Terrace, Regent's Park, for which John Nash supplied the general elevation. Gloucester Villa, at the entrance to the park, was built completely to his design. At around this time he constructed a suspension bridge over the River Bure at Great Yarmouth. It collapsed with fatal results in 1845, due to concealed defects in two suspending rods.

== Anglican churches ==
Scoles designed three Anglican churches: St Mary's Chapel, Southtown, Yarmouth (1830), St Peter's Church, Great Yarmouth (a commissioner's church, 1831), and St George's Church, Edgbaston, for Lord Calthorpe. His only other work for the established church consisted of some small additions and restorations to Burgh Castle and Blundeston churches in Suffolk.

== Roman Catholic buildings ==
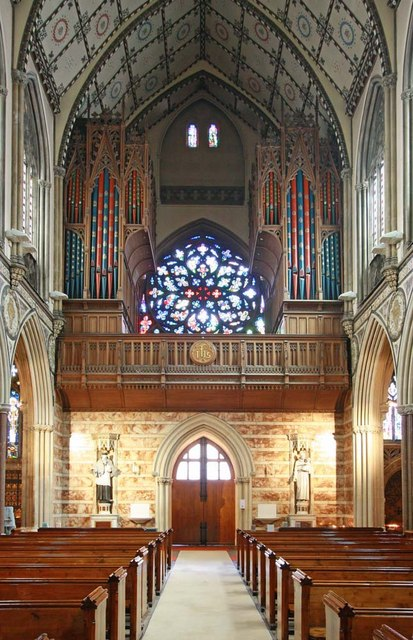
Interior of the Immaculate Conception, Farm Street, London

His works for the Roman Catholic church included Our Lady's Church, St John's Wood (1832), St Peter's Church in Stonyhurst College, Lancashire (1832), Our Lady Church, Bangor (1834, now closed), St Ignatius, Preston, Lancashire (1835), St James the Less and St Helen Church, Colchester (1837), St Mary's, Newport, Monmouthshire (1840), St David's, Cardiff (1842), St John the Evangelist Church, Islington (1843), the Immaculate Conception, Farm Street, London (1844), St Francis Xavier's, Liverpool (1844), Our Lady Immaculate, Chelmsford (1847), St Mary's Church in Great Yarmouth (1848–1850), the chapel of Ince Hall, Lancashire (1859), and the Holy Cross, St Helen's, Lancashire (1860).

His design for the church of St John in Duncan Terrace, Islington – a neo-Romanesque brick building with stone facings – was censured by Pugin in an article on "Ecclesiastical Architectures" in the Dublin Review in 1843.

In 1853 he designed a group of buildings for the London Oratory at Brompton, consisting of the Oratory House – a building in a simple Italianate style, incorporating a chapel, known as the Little Oratory, and a library – and a plain red brick temporary church, which survived until 1880. He also built a convent nearby in Sidney Street.

The chapel of Prior Park College, Bath, designed by Scoles, was erected after his death by his son. Unlike Scoles' other ecclesiastical work, this was Neoclassical in style, in sympathy with the mansion to which it was attached. It was built to a simple aisled basilican plan with an apse.

== Royal Institute of British Architects ==
Scoles was elected a fellow of the Royal Institute of British Architects in 1835, was honorary secretary from May 1846 to May 1856, and vice-president in 1857–1858. Most of his contributions to the society's Proceedings were about the monuments of Egypt and the Holy Land, studied during his early travels.

== Family ==
He died on 29 December 1863 at his home, Crofton Lodge, Hammersmith. He was survived by four sons and eight daughters from his marriage to Harriet Cory of Great Yarmouth, whom he had married in 1831. The eldest was Ignatius Scoles who followed his father as an architect, then joined the Jesuits and designed Georgetown City Hall and St Wilfrid's Church, Preston. His third son was Alexander Joseph Cory Scoles who became a Roman Catholic priest and canon and followed his brother and father in becoming an architect. He designed many lancet style Gothic Revival churches in the south of England.

== Sources ==
- Eastlake, Charles Locke (1872). A History of the Gothic Revival. London: Longmans, Green & Co.
- This article incorporates text from a publication now in the public domain: Nicholl, Samuel Joseph (1897). "Scoles, Joseph John" . In Lee, Sidney (ed.). Dictionary of National Biography. Vol. 51. London: Smith, Elder & Co.
