= St James the Less and St Helen Church, Colchester =

Coordinates: 51.889355°N 0.908454°E

St James' Church
- St James the Less and St Helen Church
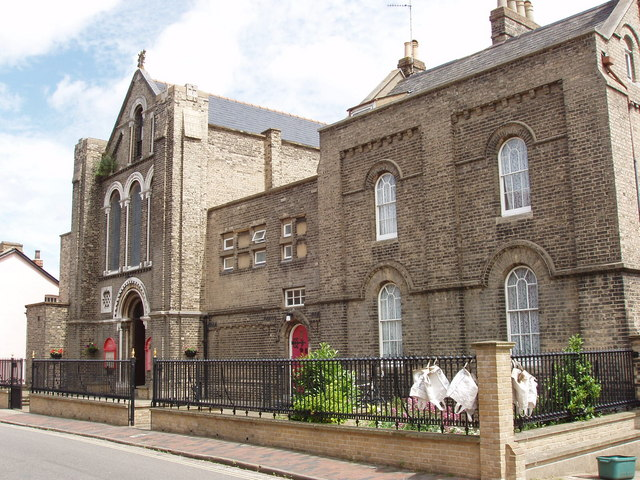

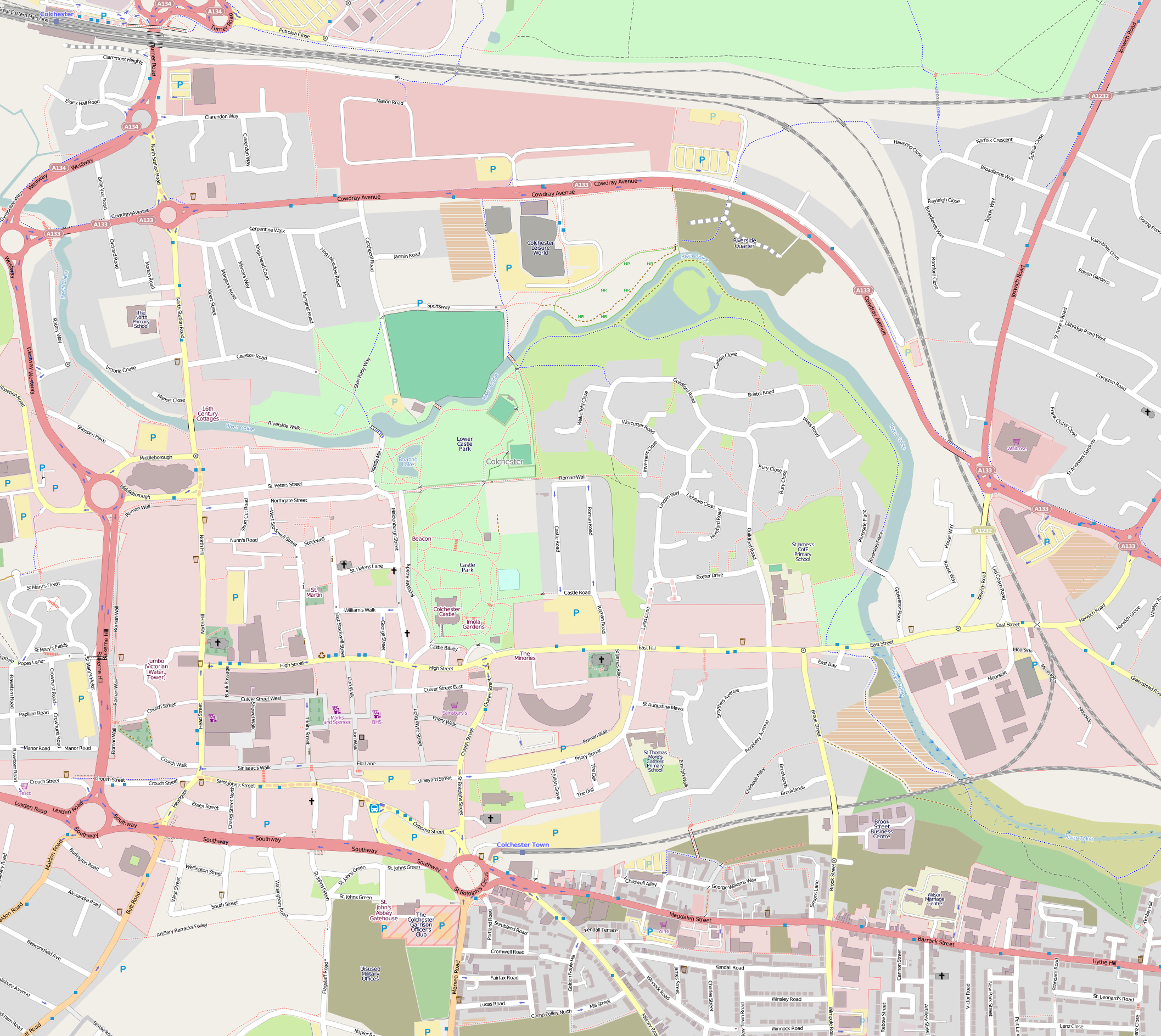
- Location in Colchester
- Location: Colchester, Essex
- Country: England
- Denomination: Roman Catholic
- Website: StJamestheLessandStHelen.org

History
- Former name(s): St James the Great Church; St James the Less Church
- Status: Parish church
- Dedication: James the Less and Helena

Architecture
- Functional status: Active
- Architect: Joseph John Scoles
- Style: Romanesque Revival
- Groundbreaking: 3 March 1837
- Construction cost: £2,750

Administration
- Province: Westminster
- Diocese: Brentwood
- Deanery: Colchester

St James the Less and St Helen Church is a Roman Catholic Parish church in Colchester, Essex, England. It was built in 1837 and designed by Joseph John Scoles. It is situated on Priory Street between the junction with East Hill and St Thomas More Catholic Primary School in the city centre. Next to it is the church hall which was built in 1911 and designed by Alexander Scoles.

== History ==
=== Foundation ===
At the end of the eighteenth century, the Roman Catholic community in Colchester consisted of exiles from the French Revolution. In the early nineteenth century Irish Catholic soldiers were stationed in the town. In 1814, a French priest, Fr Amand Benard, served the community and the local garrison.

In 1831, a building was provided for the local Catholic community near North Hill. It was given by William Dearn, a former soldier and local tradesman. A priest would come from Witham to say Mass there.

=== Construction ===
The site for the present church was donated by James Hoy, a farmer from Stoke-by-Nayland. The church mission there was funded by Alfred Stourton, 23rd Baron Mowbray. On 3 March 1837, the foundation stone for the church was laid by the Vicar Apostolic of the London District, Thomas Griffiths. Construction of the church cost £2,750 in total. The architect was Joseph John Scoles. He designed the church in the Romanesque Revival style reminiscent of the nearby ruins of St Botolph's Priory. Scoles later used a similar plan when he designed St John the Evangelist Church in Islington four years later. The church was originally dedicated to Saint James the Greater. Also it had no external statues or images, to lessen any hostility from the local non-Catholic community.

=== Developments ===
In 1900, the church was renamed as St James the Less so as to avoid confusion with the nearby Anglican St James the Great Church on East Hill. Two years later, in 1902, the church name was again changed, to St James the Less and St Helen. Saint Helen was reported to have been born in Colchester by local historical accounts.

In the 1850s, during the Crimean War the civilians in the congregation were outnumbered by the locally garrisoned Catholic soldiers. In 1865, a separate military chaplain was appointed to Colchester. In 1867 the chaplain used the camp chapel in Military Road. In 1904, St James' Church again became the garrison's centre for worship. In 1954, a garrison church was built in the Colchester Garrison. This closed in the 1980s. Since then, Masses for the army families have been said at St John the Baptist Church in the Shrub End part of the town, which is served from St Teresa of Lisieux Church in Lexden.

In 1891, a community Sisters of Mercy moved into the parish from Brentwood. In 1896, they built a school next door.

=== Extensions ===
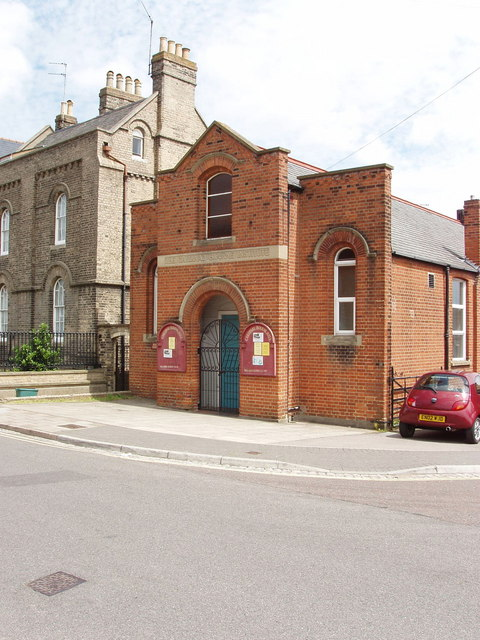
Church hall

In 1861, to make more space for the soldiers in the increasing number in the congregation, the church organ was removed from the church gallery. From 1902 to 1932, the parish priest was a Canon Bloomfield, who oversaw the enlargement of the church. In 1904 the north aisle and sacristy were added. In 1907 the south aisle was added. The architect for these additions to the church was Charles Edward Butcher. They cost £2,000 and were paid for by Dean Lucas.

In 1911 the church hall was built next door, with the architect being Canon Alexander Scoles, the son of Joseph John Scoles. It was opened by the Archbishop of Westminster, Cardinal Francis Bourne. It was renamed as the Cardinal Bourne Institute.

In 1975, the church was reordered. In 1987, stained-glass windows were added to the Blessed Sacrament chapel in the church. They were taken from a redundant church and were originally designed by Augustus Pugin.

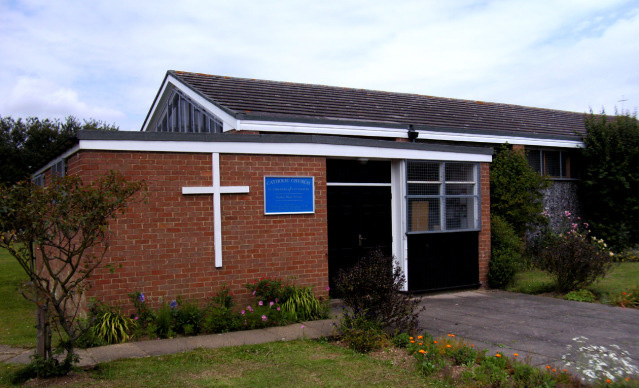
St Theodore of Canterbury Church, Monkwick, served from St James' Church

== Parish ==
The nearby churches in and around Colchester are served from St James' Church: St Cedd and St Gregory's Church in West Mersea, St Joseph's Church in Mile End and St Theodore of Canterbury Church in Monkwick. Each of these churches has one Sunday Mass: St Cedd and St Gregory Church at 8:30am, St Joseph's Church at 9:15am and St Theodore of Canterbury's Church at 10:15am.

St James' Church has five Sunday Masses: 6:15pm on Saturday, as well as 8:00am, 10:30am, 2:00pm (in Polish) and 6:30pm on Sunday.

== See also ==
- Roman Catholic Diocese of Brentwood
