= Holy Cross Church, St Helens =

Holy Cross Church
- Church of the Holy Cross and St Helen
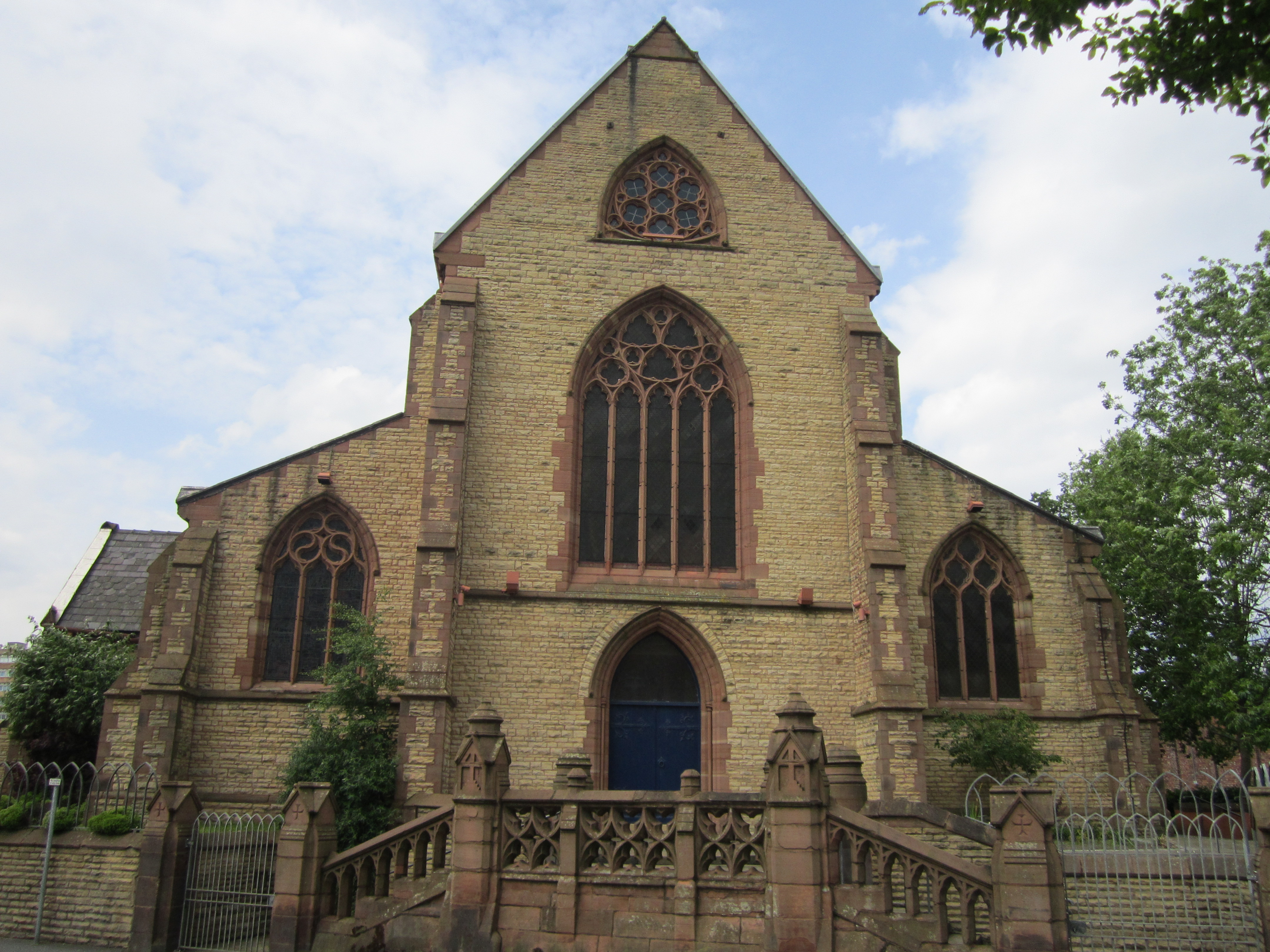
- Front - Eastern Aspect
- Holy Cross Church
- 53.4537°N 2.7320°W
- OS grid reference: SJ 51487 95464
- Location: St Helens, Merseyside
- Country: England
- Denomination: Roman Catholic
- Website: http://holycrosssthelens.business.site/

History
- Status: Active

Architecture
- Functional status: Church
- Heritage designation: Grade II listed
- Designated: 23 August 1985
- Architect: Joseph John Scoles
- Groundbreaking: 3 May 1860
- Completed: 1 May 1862

Administration
- Province: Liverpool (aka Northern)
- Archdiocese: Liverpool
- Deanery: St Helens - St Monica Pastoral Area
- Parish: Holy Cross

Clergy
- Archbishop: Most Rev. John Sherrington
- Priest(s): Rev. Fr. Jino Arikkatt MCBS, Rev. Fr. Anto Varghese MCBS

Holy Cross and St Helen Church is a Roman Catholic church in St Helens, Merseyside. The church was built in 1860 by the Society of Jesus. It was designed by Joseph John Scoles and is a Grade II listed building.

== History ==
The church was founded by the Society of Jesus in 1860. Fr Thomas Seed, the head of the Jesuits in Britain, who also founded Sacred Heart Church in Edinburgh laid the foundation stone of the church on 3 May 1860, what was then Feast of the Finding of the True Cross.

The church was designed by Joseph John Scoles who also designed St Ignatius Church, Preston in Lancashire, Immaculate Conception Church, Farm Street in London and the Church of Saint Francis Xavier, Liverpool. Construction of the church lasted for almost two years and the church was opened on 1 May 1862.

In the church there is a memorial stone dated 1933, showing when the Jesuits handed over the church to the Archdiocese of Liverpool, who have continued to administer it ever since.

== Parish ==
Sunday Mass is at 10am. Weekday Masses are as follows: 12.15pm Monday - Friday, and 10am on Saturday. Confessions are from 11am to 11.45am before the 12.15pm Mass. There are no confessions on Tuesdays. In addition Exposition takes place each day. The church is open for adoration 10am - 4pm on Monday, Wednesday and Friday.

Entrance to the church is via Corporation Street (southern side) or Parade Street (northern side), where there is also an additional gate for level access. The original front entrance is no longer used.

In July 2020, the church of SS Peter & Paul, Haresfinch was closed, and this parish was merged into the parish of Holy Cross and St Helen under its former Parish Priest, Rev. Fr. Kevan O'Brien.

In January 2025, Fr. O'Brien retired after more than 20 years serving the people of St. Helens. The parish is now under the care of Fr. Jino Arikkatt, of the Missionary Congregation of the Blessed Sacrament. Fr. Anto Varghese recently joined the parish as assistant parish priest.

== Gallery ==
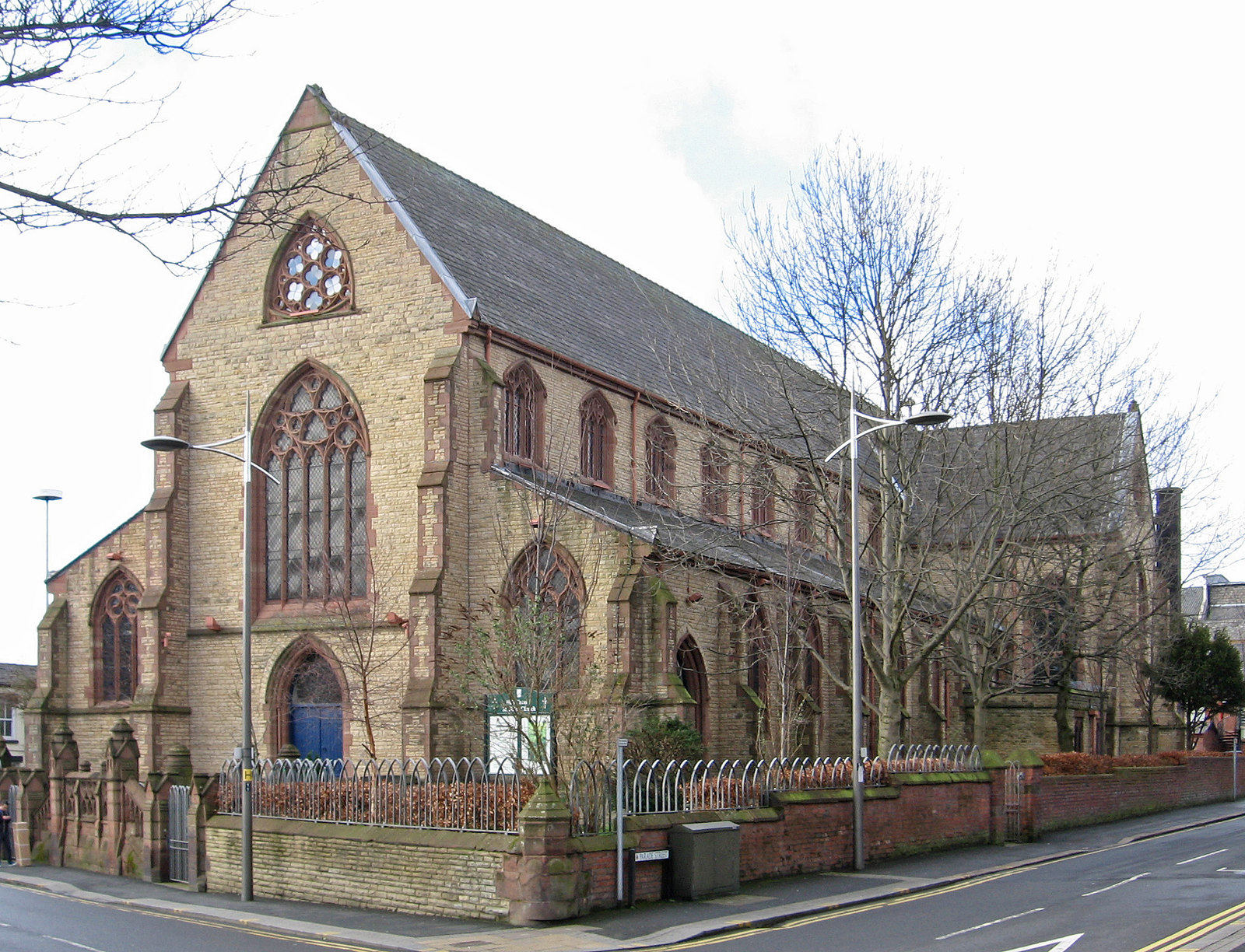
North-Eastern aspect of Church of Holy Cross & St. Helen, St. Helens, Merseyside

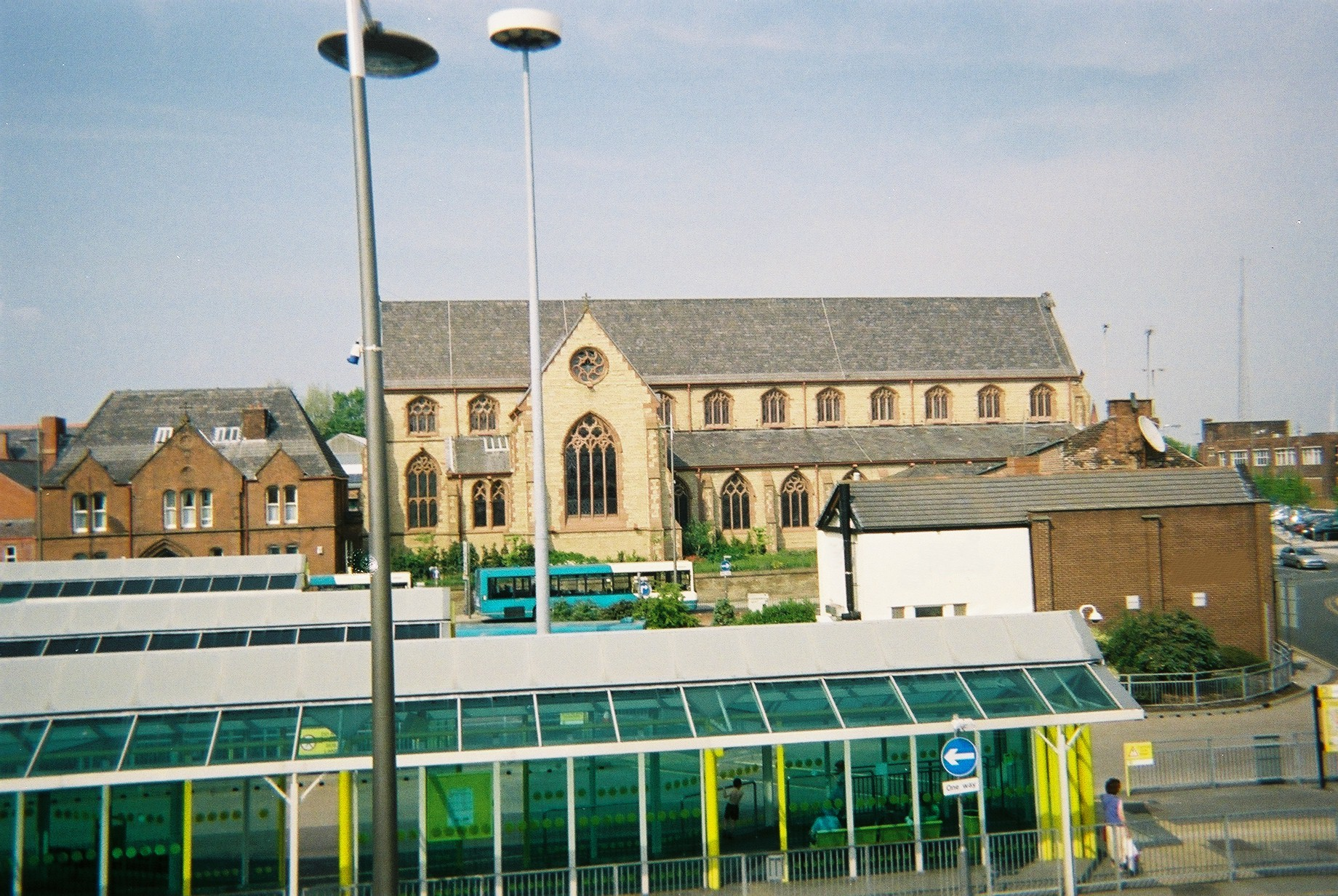
Southern aspect of Church of Holy Cross & St. Helen, St. Helens, Merseyside

== See also ==
- Listed buildings in St Helens, Merseyside
