= Syro-Malabar Cathedral of St Alphonsa, Preston =

Coordinates: 53.7637°N 2.6967°W

Syro-Malabar Cathedral of St Alphonsa
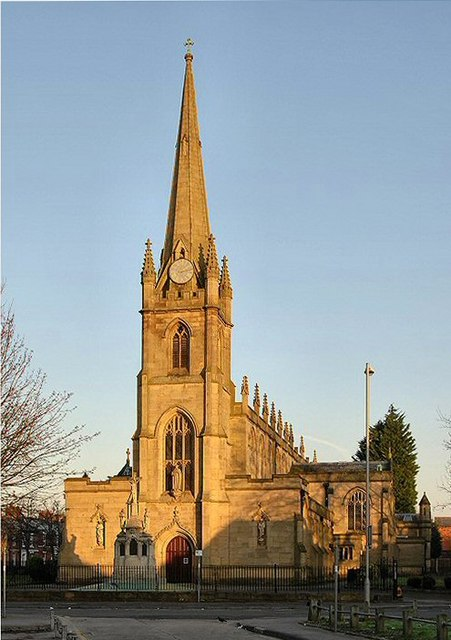
- Entrance from Meadow Street

- Location in Preston
- OS grid reference: SD5416929933
- Location: Preston, Lancashire
- Country: England
- Denomination: Catholic (Syro-Malabar Catholic Church)
- Tradition: East Syriac Rite
- Website: official website

History
- Former name: St Ignatius Church
- Status: Cathedral
- Founded: 1833
- Founder: Society of Jesus
- Dedication: Alphonsa of the Immaculate Conception; Ignatius of Loyola

Architecture
- Functional status: Active
- Heritage designation: Grade II*
- Designated: 27 September 1979
- Architect: Joseph John Scoles
- Style: Gothic Revival
- Groundbreaking: 1833
- Completed: 1886; 140 years ago

Administration
- Diocese: Eparchy of Great Britain

The Syro-Malabar Cathedral of St Alphonsa is a Catholic cathedral of the Syro-Malabar rite in Preston, Lancashire. It is the cathedral of the Syro-Malabar Catholic Eparchy of Great Britain, and was previously St Ignatius Church under the Diocese of Lancaster. It is situated close to the Preston city centre, with the entrance on Meadow Street. The building was opened in 1836 and was the first church in Preston to have a spire.

Since January 2015, the church has been used as a cathedral for the Syro-Malabar Catholic Church. In 2016 Pope Francis raised the status of the church to that of cathedral and appointed Monsignor Joseph (Benny Mathew) Srampickal as the first bishop.

== History ==
=== Foundation ===
Prior to the Catholic Emancipation Act 1829 the first legal Roman Catholic churches were built in a simple style similar to that used for Non-Conformist chapels and often incorporated the priest's house. The church was originally a Jesuit foundation.

=== Building ===
St Ignatius is one of the earliest examples of a Gothic style in the city of Preston. Work on the church started in 1833. The architect was Joseph John Scoles, who also designed the Church of the Immaculate Conception, Farm Street, in London and the Church of Saint Francis Xavier, Liverpool for the Society of Jesus.

St Ignatius is one of the oldest surviving Roman Catholic church buildings in the city, and the architectural historian Sir Nicholas Pevsner declared it to be of national interest along with the sister Preston church of St Walburge. He said that it was an unusually planned Roman Catholic complex for this date.

Originally the church was much smaller, but in 1858 five new bays were added, including a new chancel and side chapels. The architect was Joseph Hansom who designed St Walburge's in 1847. The church still possesses original designs for stained glass by John Hardman of Hardman & Co., but the windows were not made. Further alterations were made to the church in 1885–6 by Matthew Ellison Hadfield and George Webster. The confessionals were removed providing space for two new chapels, and the remodelling of the chancel. The altar was raised and a new super altar made from Hopton Wood Stone placed on it. New confessionals were built outside the walls and a third chapel, of the Sacred Heart, was added at the north end. Alabaster figures and much wood and stone carving were added by Frank Tory of Sheffield. In 1912 a side chapel and baptistery were added.

=== Developments ===
The church had a relationship with St Ignatius Catholic Primary School next door. The school was built in 1863 and extended in 2000. Masses were regularly held in the church for the school.

Outside the church is St Ignatius Square. In 1982 the square was declared to be a local conservation area, preventing any development that would significantly change the character of the historic part of Preston.

In 2001, the church saw the departure of its last resident parish priest, and it was merged with the parish of English Martyrs Church. Mass was celebrated in the church once a week, at 9:30 am every Sunday. On 11 October 2014, the parish was amalgamated to include the congregations of St Teresa's, St Joseph's and St Augustine's and was renamed the Parish of St John XXIII.

=== Syro-Malabar Church ===
On 2 December 2014, the church was closed. On 31 December 2014, Michael Campbell, Roman Catholic Bishop of Lancaster, was asked by George Alencherry, Major archbishop of the Syro-Malabar Catholic Church, for exclusive use of a church in Preston by the local Syro-Malabar community. The bishop offered St Ignatius church, which was accepted. Liturgies are celebrated in the Syro Malabar rite.

== People ==
The 19th century mystic poet Francis Thompson was baptised at the church in 1859, and the poet Fr Gerard Manley Hopkins SJ was a curate there during the late 1880s.

== Gallery ==
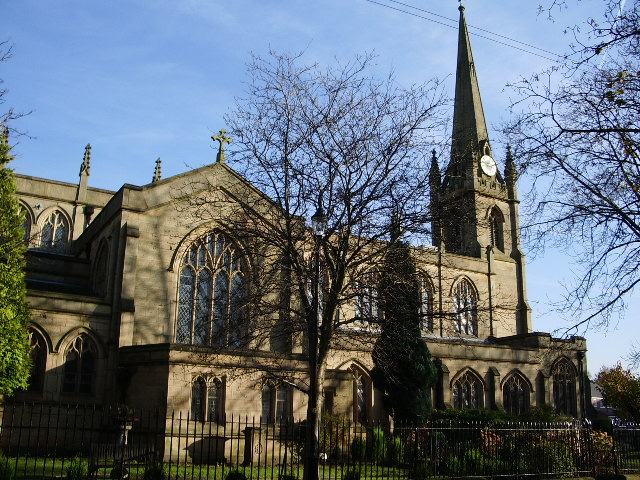
View of the west side, along St Ignatius Square

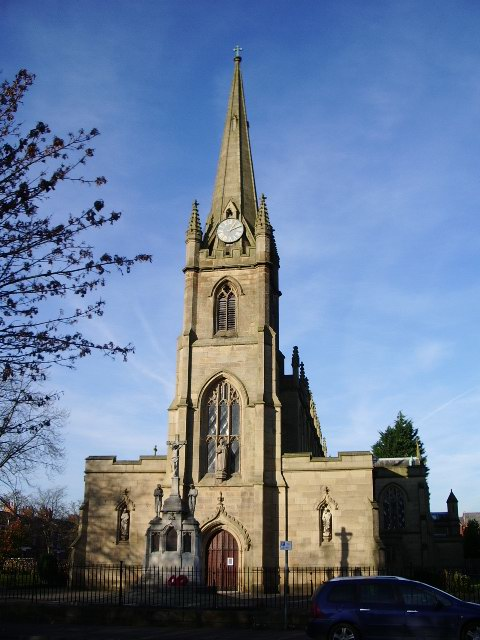
South side, along Meadow Street

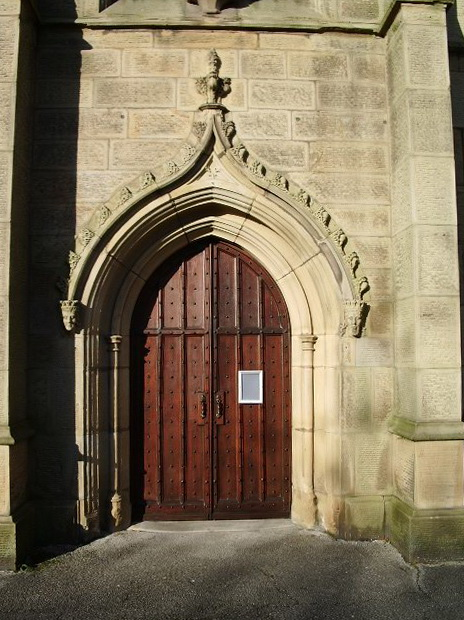
Main western doorway

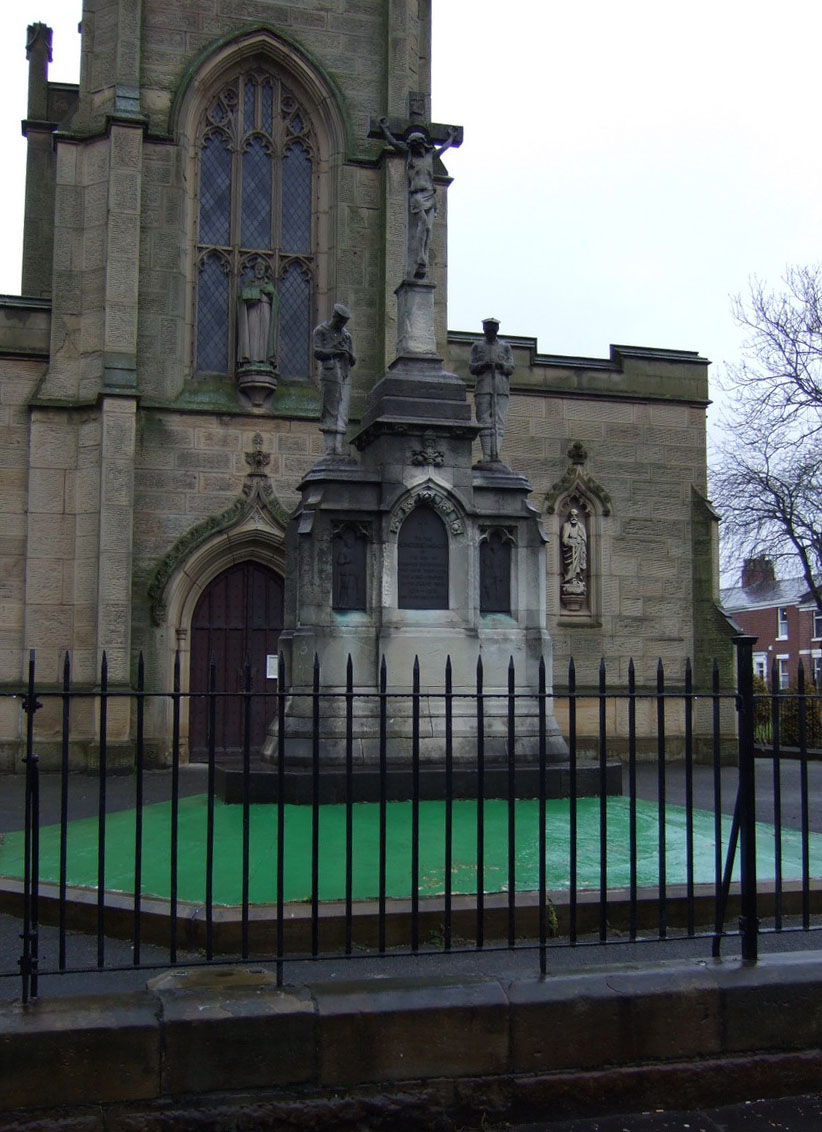
War Memorial outside

== See also ==
- List of Jesuit sites
- Listed buildings in Preston, Lancashire
