= St Mary's Church, Walsall =

St Mary's Church
- St Mary's the Mount Church
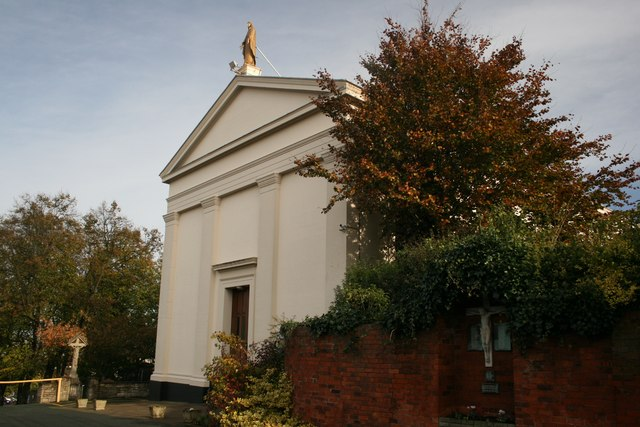
- St Mary's Church
- 52.5801°N 1.9835°W
- OS grid reference: SP 01216 98031
- Location: Walsall, West Midlands
- Country: England
- Denomination: Roman Catholic
- Website: StMarystheMount.co.uk

History
- Status: Parish church
- Founder: Fr Francis Martyn
- Dedication: Saint Mary

Architecture
- Functional status: Active
- Heritage designation: Grade II* listed
- Designated: 31 July 1986
- Architect: Joseph Ireland
- Style: Neoclassical
- Groundbreaking: 16 August 1825
- Completed: 10 May 1827

Administration
- Province: Birmingham
- Archdiocese: Birmingham
- Deanery: Walsall
- Parish: St Mary's the Mount

St Mary's Church or St Mary's the Mount Church is a Roman Catholic parish church in Walsall, West Midlands, England. It was built from 1825 to 1827 and designed by Joseph Ireland in the Neoclassical style. It is located between Glebe Street and Vicarage Place, backing on to Vicarage Walk in the centre of the town. Since 2012, it has been served by the Vocationist Fathers and it is a Grade II* listed building.

== History ==
=== Foundation ===
In 1794, Oscott College was founded in Old Oscott. From Oscott a mission was started in Walsall. In 1807, Fr Francis Martyn began serving the Walsall mission. He was the first Catholic priest since the English Reformation to have his entire training done in England. With the local Catholic population growing a larger space was needed to accommodate the increasing congregation. On 19 December 1819, Assembly Rooms at the Green Dragon Inn were hired as a place to celebrate a Catholic Mass.

=== Construction ===
With the population still increasing, a larger permanent church needed to be built. On 16 August 1825, the foundation stone of the present church was laid. The church was designed by Joseph Ireland who also designed St Peter and St Paul's Church, Wolverhampton. On 10 May 1827, the church was opened. In 1833, the presbytery next to the church was built.

=== Developments ===
In 1872, an altar made of Carrara marble was installed in the church. In 1879, the church was renovated. In 1887, new altar rails were added. In 1897, a new baptismal font was bought for the church. In 1909, stained glasses windows made by Hardman & Co. was installed in the church. Some of the reordering of the church done in the 1960s was undone in the 1970s, by the priest Fr Peter Taylor. On 31 July 1986, the church building was given Grade II* listed status.

== Parish ==
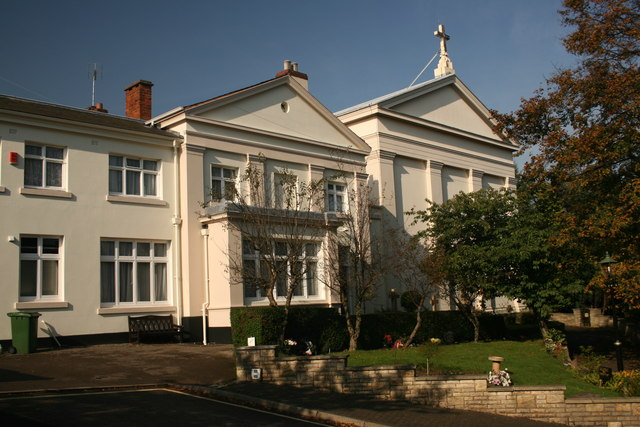
Back of the church

From St Mary's Church, other missions were started to serve other parts of Walsall. Some of those missions grew and became churches and parishes in their own right. In 1856, the mission on the corner of Blue Lane and Green Lane became St Patrick's Church. A new church was built there in 1967. From 1958 to 1960, St Thomas of Canterbury Church was built in Coal Pool. In 2012, the Vocationist Fathers came to serve the parish of St Mary's Church and also serve St Thomas of Canterbury Church and St Patrick's Church. St Mary's Church has three Sunday Masses at 5:30pm on Saturday and at 9:00am and 11:00am on Sunday. Both St Patrick's Church and St Thomas' Church have Sunday Masses at 6:30pm on Saturday and at 10:00am on Sunday, with St Patrick's having another Sunday Mass at 7:00pm.

== See also ==
- Archdiocese of Birmingham
- Grade II* listed buildings in the West Midlands
