= Listed buildings in Hassop =

Hassop is a civil parish in the Derbyshire Dales district of Derbyshire, England. The parish contains 18 listed buildings that are recorded in the National Heritage List for England. Of these, one is listed at Grade I, the highest of the three grades, one is at Grade II*, the middle grade, and the others are at Grade II, the lowest grade. The parish contains the village of Hassop and the surrounding area. The Church of All Saints is listed at Grade I, and the other major building in the parish, Hassop Hall, is listed at Grade II*. Many of the other listed buildings are associated with the hall, or are in the grounds. The rest of the listed buildings include a house and a public house, both with associated structures, a farmhouse and outbuildings, and three mileposts.

== Key ==
Grade	Criteria
I	Buildings of exceptional interest, sometimes considered to be internationally important
II*	Particularly important buildings of more than special interest
II	Buildings of national importance and special interest

== Buildings ==
Name and location	Photograph	Date	Notes	Grade
Dowager House; 53.24629°N 1.66700°W		Mid 17th century	The house, later divided into three, is in limestone with sandstone dressings, quoins, moulded floor bands forming continuous hood moulds, and a stone slate roof with coped gables and moulded and plain kneelers. There are three storeys, and a south front of three gabled bays, the outer bays projecting. The central doorway has a chamfered quoined surround and a massive lintel, and the windows are mullioned with two lights. At the rear are gabled bays, the one on the right forming a staircase tower.	II
Outbuilding west of Dowager House; 53.24629°N 1.66721°W	—	Mid 17th century	The outbuilding is in limestone with sandstone dressings, quoins, and a stone slate roof with coped gables and moulded kneelers. There is a single storey, and it contains a blocked central doorway with a quoined surround and a massive lintel. The flanking windows have single lights, and are recessed with chamfered surrounds.	II
Eyre Arms Public House and walls 53.24776°N 1.66464°W		17th century	A private house, later altered and converted into a public house, it is in limestone with gritstone dressings and a slate roof. There are two storeys, a symmetrical front of three bays, and to the right is a single-storey extension. The central doorway has a semicircular fanlight, and the windows date from the 19th century. The building is flanked by curved walls extending for about 6 metres (20 ft) on each side, the wall to the east containing a doorway.	II
Hassop Hall; 53.24658°N 1.66884°W		17th century	A country house, later a hotel, it has been altered and extended, and was extensively remodelled between 1827 and 1833. It is built in limestone with sandstone dressings, quoins, and a hipped Welsh slate roof. The main block has three storeys and a symmetrical front of seven bays, with floor and sill bands, a moulded cornice, and a parapet, partly balustraded. In the centre is a Tuscan Doric doorway with a pediment, above which is a sash window with a moulded architrave and a segmental pediment, and a circular window with an architrave and a decorated hood mould. The outer bays contain full-height canted bay windows, and the bays between contain a half-domed niche, above which is a sash window and a circular window.	II*
Home Farmhouse and outbuildings 53.24653°N 1.66695°W	—	Late 18th century	The farmhouse and attached outbuildings are in limestone with sandstone dressings and stone slate roofs. They form an irregular L-shaped plan, and have two storeys. The farmhouse has two bays, and a single-storey bay to the right. The doorway has a plain surround, and the windows are mullioned with two lights. To the right is a window and a cart entrance, both with segmental heads and voussoirs, and above is a coped parapet. Beyond is a range with three doorways and four windows.	II
Church of All Saints; 53.24747°N 1.66657°W		1816–18	The church was designed by Joseph Ireland in Neo-Classical style. It is in sandstone and has an overhanging Welsh slate roof with pedimented gables. In each pediment is a moulded circle containing a cross. At the west end is a Tuscan portico in the form of a tetrastyle prostyle temple, containing a doorway with a tapering moulded architrave and cornice. Along the south front are five windows with tapering moulded architraves, and the east end has three bays with Tuscan pilasters.	I
Ice house 53.24433°N 1.66963°W	—	Early 19th century {probable)	The ice house in the grounds of Hassop Hall is in limestone and brick. It consists of a circular domed brick chamber, that has a circular shute hole with two ring pulls. The chamber is entered through a limestone dogleg passage, and at the end is a doorway with a chamfered surround.	II
Orangery, Hassop Hall; 53.24696°N 1.67003°W	—	Early 19th century {probable)	The orangery is in red brick and sandstone on a plinth, with a sill band, a coped parapet, and a Welsh slate roof with coped gables and plain kneelers. There is a single storey and 17 bays, the outer bays projecting and containing doorways, and in the other bays are sash windows.	II
Stable Block, Hassop Hall; 53.24715°N 1.66772°W	—	Early 19th century	The stable block is in limestone with sandstone dressings, and a stone slate roof with coped gables and plain kneelers. There are two storeys and eleven bays, the outer three bays at the ends projecting. In the centre is a segmental-arched doorway flanked by flat-headed doorways, and above is a pediment containing a clock face, and a cupola with a bell and a weathervane. Elsewhere, there are sash windows, doorways and carriage entrances, most with segmental heads. To the left is a wall with an embattled parapet containing a cart entrance flanked by pedestrian gateways with pointed arches.	II
Mile Post at OS 212708; 53.23426°N 1.68501°W		Early 19th century	The mile post is on the south side of the A6020 road. It is in cast iron and consists of a circular shaft on which is a cylinder with a moulded top divided into two panels. The top is inscribed "LONDON" and the rest of the inscriptions are illegible.	II
Mile Post at OS 226703; 53.22964°N 1.66256°W		Early 19th century	The mile post is on the south side of the A6020 road. It is in cast iron and consists of a circular shaft on which is a cylinder with a moulded top divided into two panels. The top is inscribed "LONDON" and the rest of the inscriptions are illegible.	II
Mile Post at OS 235713; 53.23885°N 1.64875°W		Early 19th century	The mile post is on the south side of the A691 road. It is in cast iron and consists of a circular shaft on which is a cylinder with a moulded top divided into two panels. It is inscribed with the distance to London, and formerly the distances to Ashford-in-the-Water, Bakewell, Buxton, Baslow, Chesterfield, and Sheffield.	II
Ballroom and outbuildings, Hassop Hall; 53.24697°N 1.66902°W		1827–33	The ballroom and outbuildings, which include a dairy, a brewhouse, a laundry and a bothy, are in limestone with sandstone dressings, quoins, a Welsh slate roof, and a hipped stone slate roof. There are two storeys and an L-shaped plan, with one wing ending in an octagonal tower bay. In the south wing is a ballroom over a basement, and it has an end surmounted by a stepped and shaped gable with moulded coping, and a weathervane. On the front are floor bands, and in the ground floor is a round-arched entrance, and a segmental-arched opening o its left. The upper floor contains two sash windows with segmental heads, with a sundial between, and in the gable is an oval window with keystones and a moulded panel with a coat of arms.	II
Farm building south-southwest of the Eyre Arms Public House; 53.24744°N 1.66513°W	—	1845	The farmhouse building is in limestone with gritstone dressings, quoins, and a tile roof. There are two storeys, and it forms a long range along the roadside. The road front contains three taking-in doors. On the field side are paired doorways and windows with quoined surrounds under elliptical arches, and an arcade of eight round-headed archways, each with a keystone inscribed with a letter spelling out the date in Roman numerals.	II
Gazebo, entrance gates and walls, Hassop Hall; 53.24712°N 1.66695°W		1853	The gate piers flanking the entrance to the drive are in stone, with panels and moulded pyramidal caps, and between them are decorative wrought iron gates and an overthrow incorporating shields. To the south is a gazebo in Jacobean style, in limestone, sandstone and red brick. There is a single storey and a basement, a square plan, and a floor band. In the basement is a single-light window and a doorway with a chamfered surround. The upper floor contains a mullioned and transomed window in each face, a dated panel, and at the corners are square piers with moulded capitals and bases. At the top is a moulded cornice, a decorative moulded embattled parapet, and obelisk corner finials. Lining the drive to the west are parallel walls.	II
North Lodge and wall, Hassop Hall; 53.24714°N 1.66665°W		1853	The lodge is in sandstone, and has an overhanging roof in Welsh slate. There is a single storey, and the east front contains a two-light mullioned window. In the angle is a recessed porch with a two-bay arcade on square piers with moulded capitals. To the right is a square bay window with a pedimented gable, and the west front contains a decorative moulded chimney piece and single-light windows. Extending to the west is a wall with a balustrade.	II
South gates, Hassop Hall; 53.24308°N 1.66794°W		1853	The entrance to the drive and the pedestrian entrances are flanked by rusticated sandstone piers with acorn finials that are linked by round arches. Between them are decorative wrought iron gates. Outside the piers are curved walls with plain copings, ending in rusticated piers.	II
South Lodge, Hassop Hall; 53.24322°N 1.66794°W		1853	The lodge, which is in Italianate style, is in limestone with gritstone dressings, quoins, a sill band, a moulded cornice, and a hipped and gabled Welsh slate roof. There are two storeys, an L-shaped plan, and a main front of three bays. On the front is a bay window with a half-dormer above, to the right is a gabled porch, and further to the right is a two-light mullioned window rising to a half-dormer.	II
