= Church of Our Lady of the Assumption, Englefield Green =

Church of Our Lady of the Assumption
- Church of Our Lady of the Assumption, Englefield Green
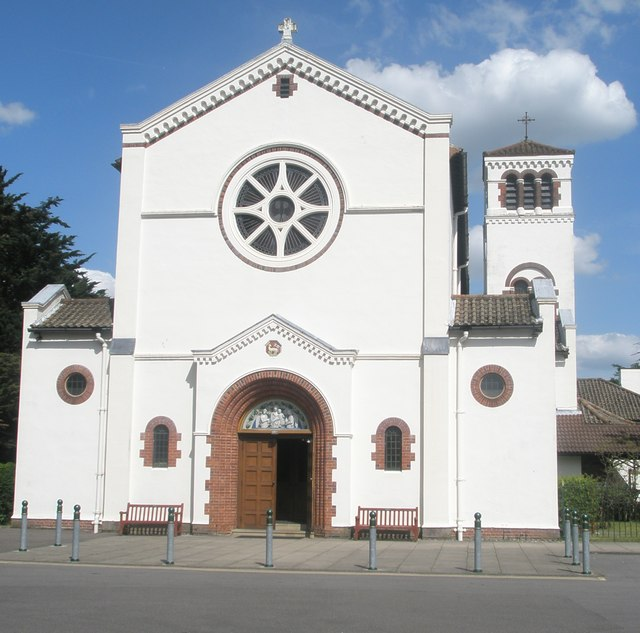
- West side of church
- Church of Our Lady of the Assumption
- 51.428866°N 0.566813°W
- Location: Englefield Green, Surrey
- Country: England
- Denomination: Roman Catholic
- Website: PoEgham.wordpress.com

History
- Former name: St Cuthbert Church
- Status: Active
- Founded: 1903
- Founder(s): A. K. Rideout; refounded by Jurgens family
- Dedication: Assumption of Mary
- Dedicated: 20 September 1931
- Consecrated: 20 September 1931

Architecture
- Functional status: Parish church
- Architect: Joseph Goldie
- Architectural type: Nave with small chapels and belfry tower
- Style: Italian Romanesque
- Years built: 1930 to 1931
- Groundbreaking: 25 October 1930
- Completed: 10 September 1931

Administration
- Province: Southwark
- Diocese: Arundel and Brighton
- Deanery: Weybridge
- Parish: Weybridge

The Church of Our Lady of the Assumption is a Roman Catholic church in Englefield Green, Surrey. It is situated on St Cuthbert's Close and faces Harvest Road in the older side of the village close to Egham Hill. It was built from 1930 to 1931 and designed by Joseph Goldie. Although the church is not a listed building, English Heritage, in two separate reports, stated "this is a thumping great church" and "many churches were being built in the Romanesque style in the 1930s ... but Goldie's church is better composed and more competently detailed than most."

== History ==
=== Foundation ===
In 1903, a priest came at least weekly from Twickenham to serve local Catholics in Englefield Green. Mass was held in a small chapel of an iron framework within the grounds of Sandylands, the home of Major General Arthur Kennedy Rideout who also arranged transport for the priest. In 1907, a larger wooden church was built on Harvest Road, named St Cuthbert's Church. The chapel at Sandylands was moved and attached to the church.

=== Construction ===
In the late 1920s, Gerard and Miriam Jurgens bought the site for a new church and paid its construction. The foundation stone was laid on 25 October 1930. On 20 September the next year, the church was opened. It is in an Italian basilica style and was designed by Joseph Goldie, son of Edward Goldie and grandson of George Goldie. He designed the Church of Our Lady and St Peter in Leatherhead. The Jurgens family asked for the dedication to be changed to the Assumption of Our Lady. After the church was built, the old wooden church was attached to the new church and became the parish hall.

== Architecture ==
=== Exterior ===
The church is in the form of a basilica with a polygonal sanctuary. A tower rounds off the southeast side. Chapels grace both transepts. The building is painted white and has Roman tiles on the roof. There is a priest's house to the east of the church and a parish hall to the south, all painted white similar to the church.

=== Interior ===
The church has a nave with narrow central aisle and cloistered aisles to the sides. The entire interior is painted. Above the main altar is a painting of the Assumption of Mary by the Spanish artist Antonio Palomino, painted in the seventeenth century. The organ was given to the church by David Greig, owner of the supermarket chain.

== Parish ==
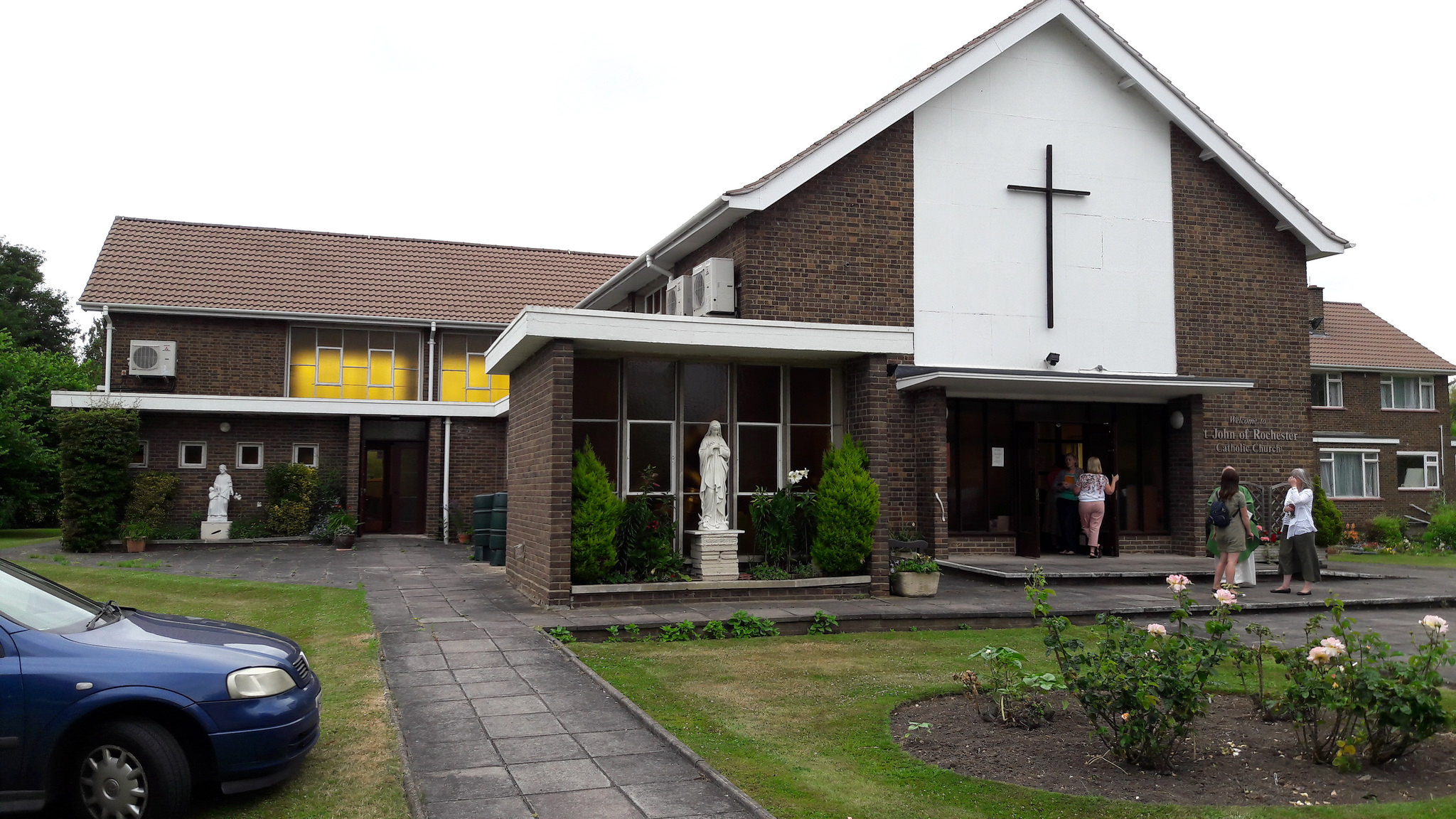
St John of Rochester Church in Egham Hythe

The church was previously in the parish of Saint Cuthbert, which included the Saint John of Rochester Church in Egham Hythe and the Catholic chaplaincy to the nearby Royal Holloway College of the University of London. In 2023, St Joh of Rochester Church closed. In 2025, the parishes were restructured and the church is now in the parish of Weybridge.

Our Lady of the Assumption Church has 3 Sunday Masses at 6:00pm on Saturday, and 9:15am and 11:00am on Sunday. St Joseph's Chapel, to the side of the church, has Weekday Mass at 9:30am on Monday, Tuesday, Thursday and Friday.

== Interior ==
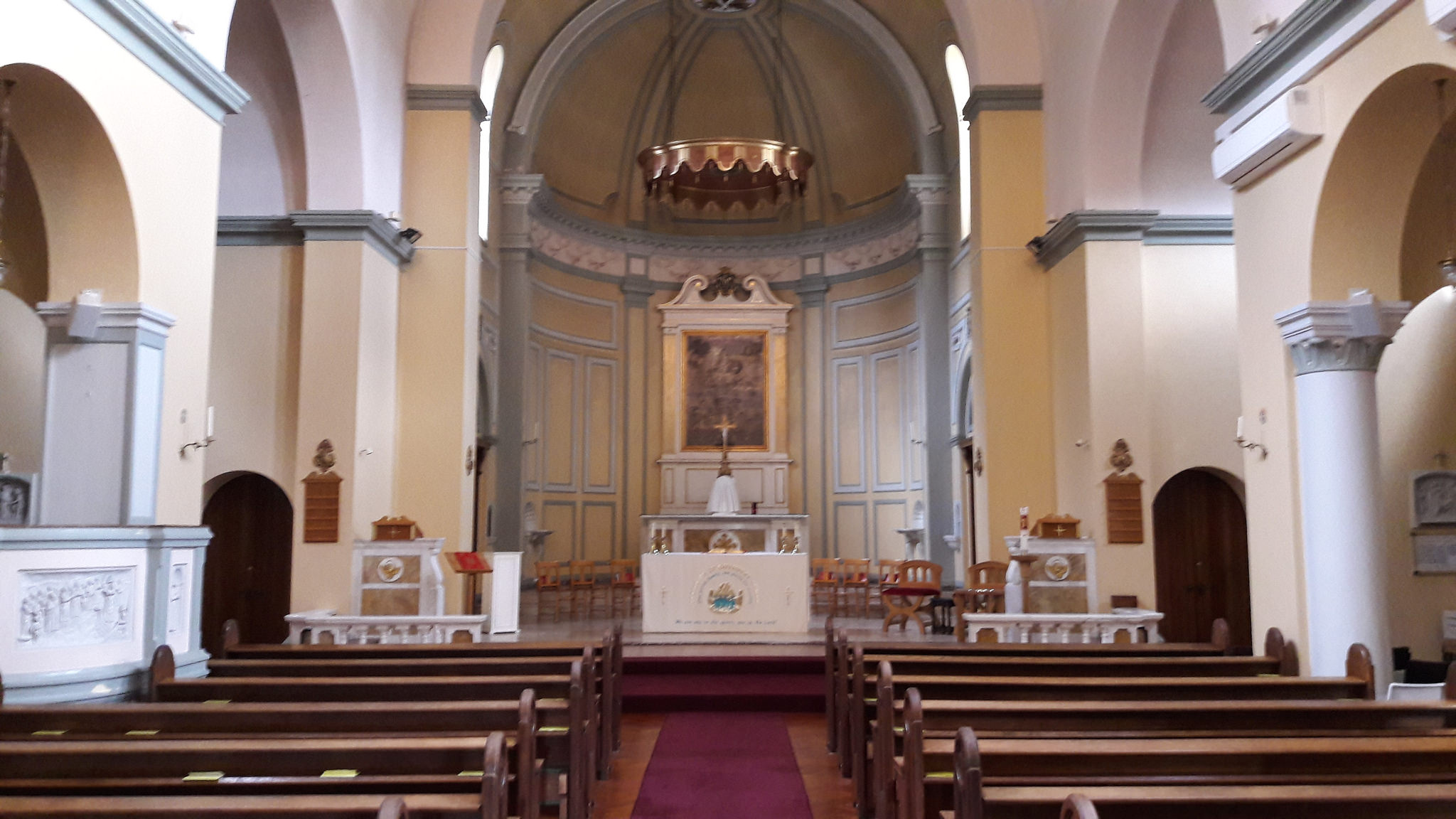
Interior

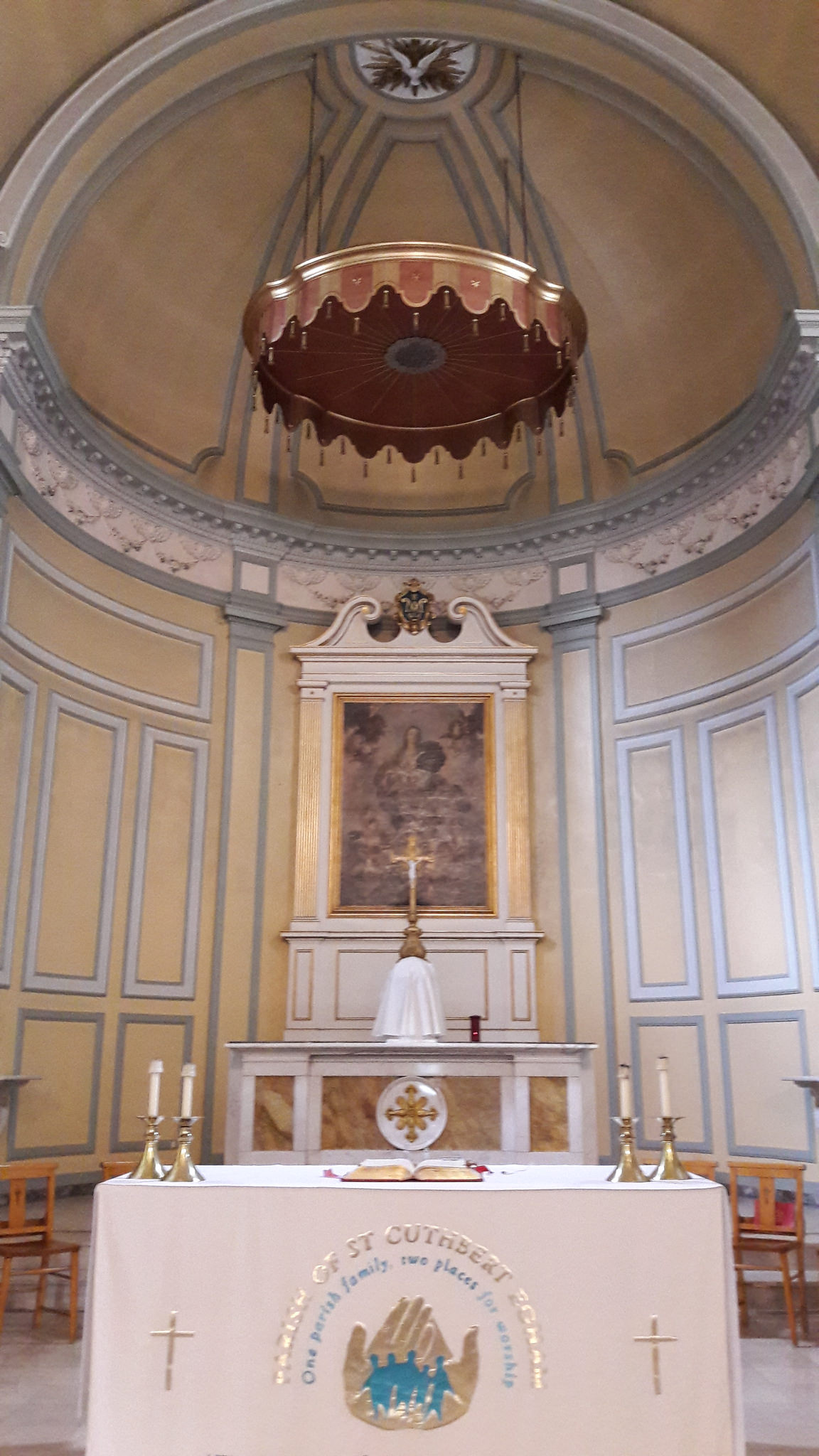
Altar

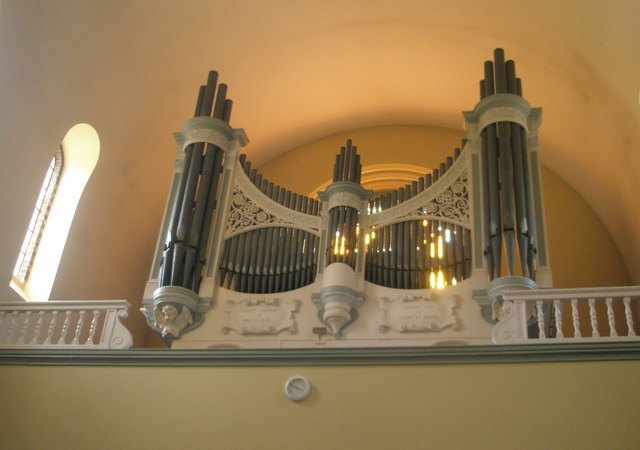
Organ

== See also ==
- Roman Catholic Diocese of Arundel and Brighton
