= Church of All Saints, Hassop =

Coordinates: 53.2475°N 1.6666°W

All Saints Church, Hassop, Derbyshire
- Church of All Saints
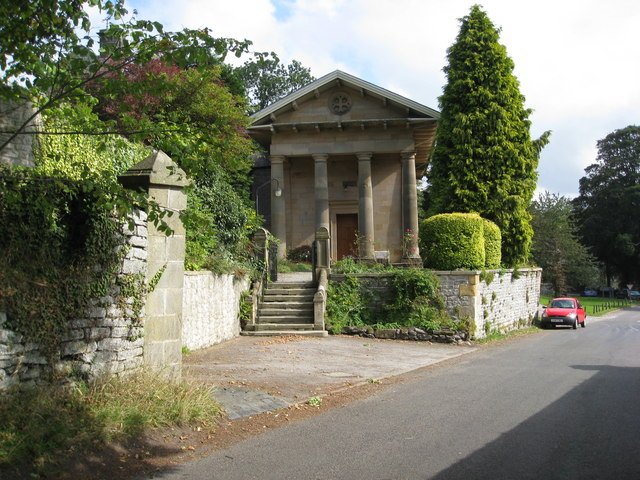
- Church of All Saints

- Location in Derbyshire
- Location: Hassop, Derbyshire
- Country: England
- Denomination: Roman Catholic

History
- Status: Parish church
- Founded: 1858
- Founder: Francis Eyre of Hassop Hall

Architecture
- Functional status: Active
- Heritage designation: Grade I
- Designated: 12 July 1967
- Architect: Joseph Ireland
- Architectural type: Church
- Style: Neoclassical
- Groundbreaking: 1816
- Completed: 1817

Administration
- Diocese: Roman Catholic Diocese of Nottingham

Clergy
- Priest: Fr Robbie O'Callaghan

The Church of All Saints is a Roman Catholic parish church in Hassop, Derbyshire. Built in 1816–17, the architect was Joseph Ireland. It is a Grade I listed building.

== History ==
Francis Eyre of Hassop Hall built the original chapel between 1816 and 1817. The Eyres had lived at Hassop since the 15th century and were prominent local Catholics. The architect, Joseph Ireland, worked for many Catholic families in the Midlands but few of his buildings survive.

== Description ==
The style of the building is Neoclassical, with the appearance of a Greek Temple. The building is constructed of sandstone, with a roof of Welsh slate. The main, western, front has a Tuscan Doric portico. The eastern front is windowless, with Tuscan pilasters.

The interior was remodelled in 1995 and features a coffered ceiling and a "rather wild Baroque altar and reredos".

== See also ==
- Grade I listed churches in Derbyshire
- Grade I listed buildings in Derbyshire
- Listed buildings in Hassop
