= Edward Goldie =

British architect

Edward Goldie (1856–1921) was an English ecclesiastical architect who was notable for building Roman Catholic churches, mainly in the form of Gothic Revival architecture. He was the son of George Goldie.

== Life ==
He was born in Sheffield in 1856. His father was the ecclesiastical architect George Goldie. Edward was the great-grandson of architect Joseph Bonomi, through his paternal grandmother, Mary Anne Bonomi, wife of George Goldie, a doctor.

He went to school at Ushaw College in County Durham, as his father had previously done. In 1875, he was articled to Goldie & Child. It was an architectural firm which his father ran with Charles Edwin Child. After his apprenticeship ended in 1880, he remained at the firm as a partner, so it became Goldie, Child & Goldie. From 1893, Edward ran the firm on his own. In 1913, he was joined by his son, Joseph Goldie, and the firm became Edward Goldie & Son until 1953.

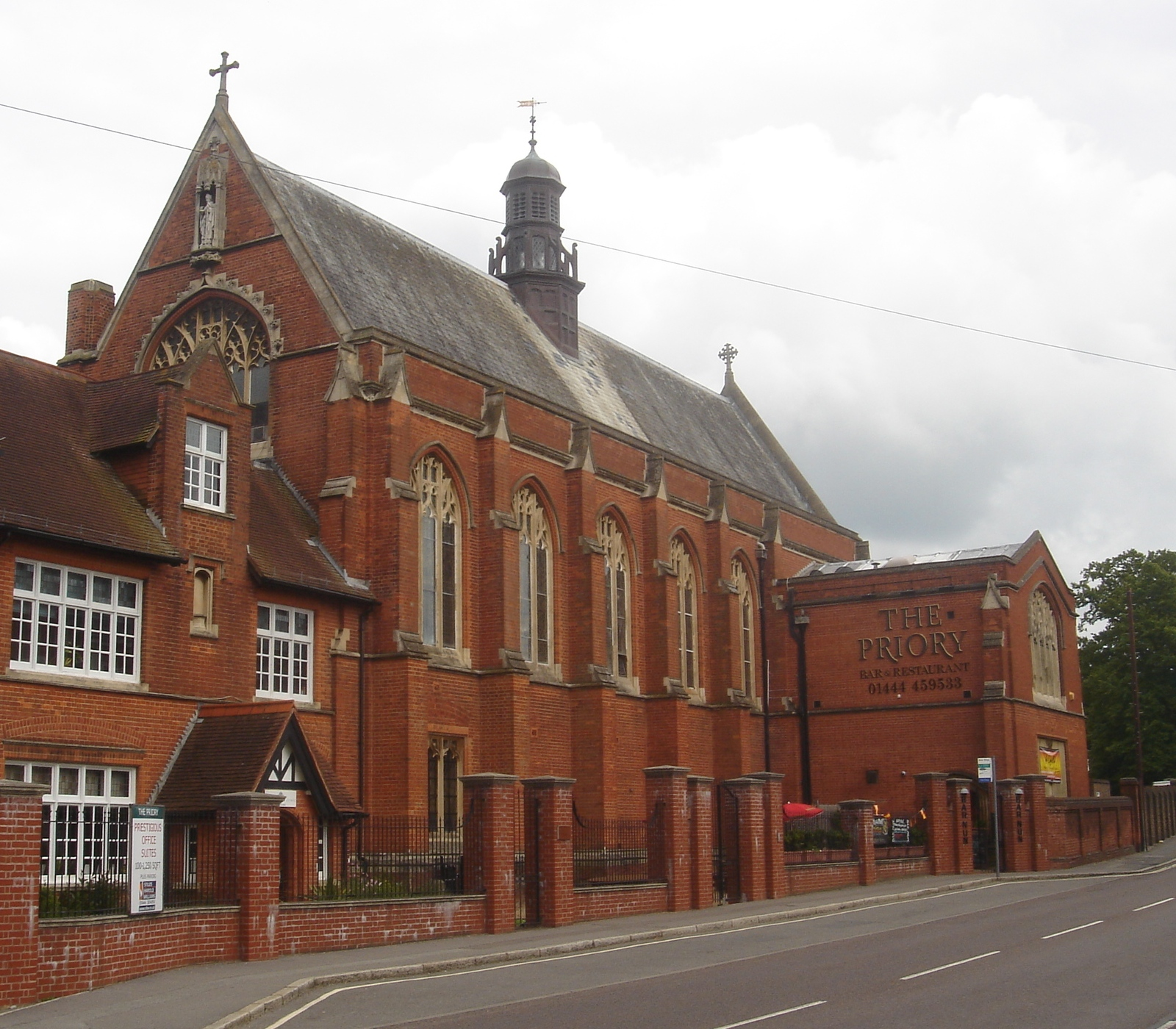
Former Priory of Our Lady of Good Counsel, Haywards Heath

Edward is perhaps best known for designing St James's, Spanish Place, whose original chapel had been designed by his great-grandfather, Joseph Bonomi. He also designed the Priory of Our Lady of Good Counsel in Haywards Heath for a community of nuns from Bruges.

== Joseph Goldie ==
Edward Goldie's son, Joseph Goldie (1882–1953), followed in the steps of his father and grandfather and became an ecclesiastical architect designing churches for the Roman Catholic church. Joseph Goldie, with his father, were the architects for St John the Evangelist Church in Horsham. After his father's death, he designed Church of Our Lady and St Peter in Leatherhead in 1923, St Thomas More Catholic Church in Dulwich in 1928, St Patrick's Church in Cardiff in 1929, Church of the Assumption of Our Lady in Englefield Green in 1930 and St Dunstan's Church in Woking, which was demolished in 2008.

== Works ==
His works include:

- Priory of Our Lady of Good Counsel, Haywards Heath (1887) -adaptive reuse.
- St James's, Spanish Place, London, completed in 1890.
- St Alban's Church, Larkhill, Lancashire, built from 1900 to 1901.
- St Cecilia's Abbey, Ryde, Isle of Wight, completed in 1907.
- St George's Retreat, Burgess Hill, built from 1905 to 1906.
- The Lees, 1 Manor Road, Brighton, built in 1906 for St George's Retreat's Reverent Superioress.
- St John the Evangelist Church, Horsham, West Sussex, built from 1919 until 1923.
- St Paul the Apostle, Wood Green, London; 1904, replaced 1971.
- St Peter and St Paul Church, Wolverhampton, extension built in 1901.
- St Thomas a Becket, Wandsworth, London, completed in 1895.
- Ashorne Hill House, Newbold Pacey, Warwickshire, built from 1895 to 1897.
- Hawkesyard Priory, Staffordshire, built from 1896 to 1914.
- Our Lady of England Priory, Storrington, West Sussex, built from 1904 to 1905.
- Our Most Holy Redeemer and St Thomas More, Chelsea, London, built from 1894 to 1895.
- Our Lady of Lourdes Church, Acton, built 1902.

== Gallery ==
St James' Church, Spanish Place

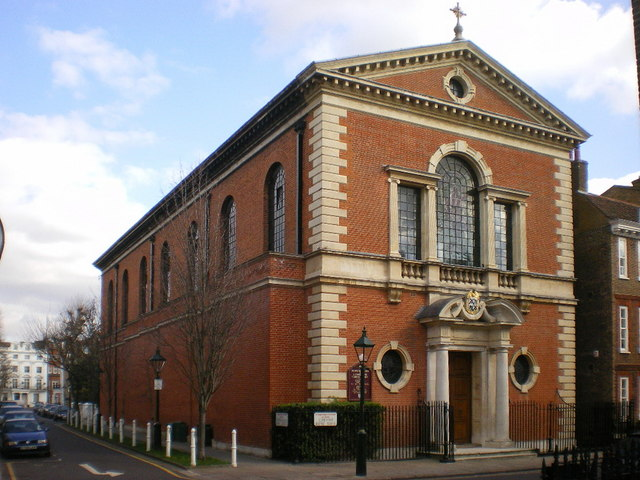
Church of Our Most Holy Redeemer and St Thomas More, Chelsea

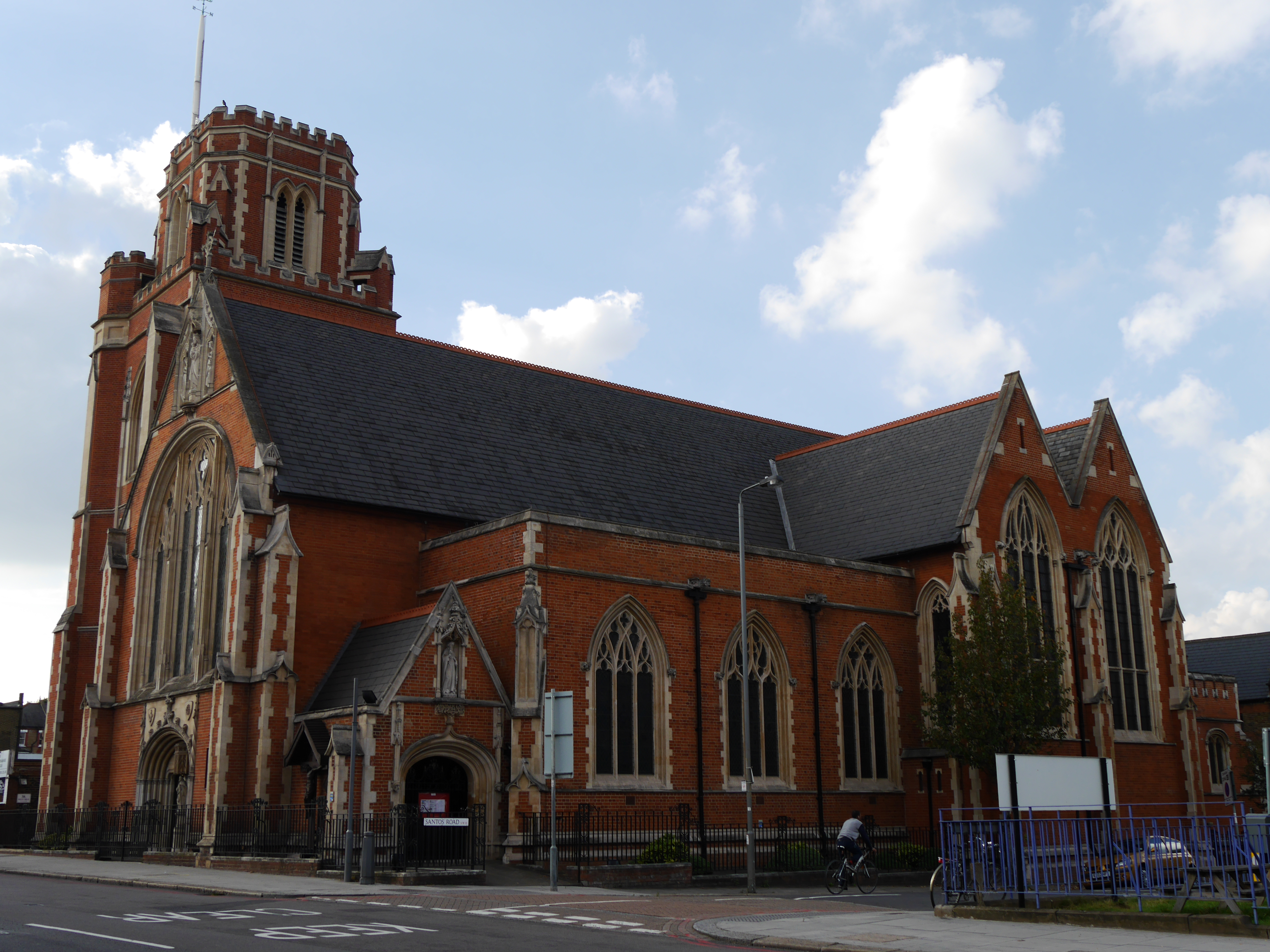
St Thomas a Becket, Wandsworth

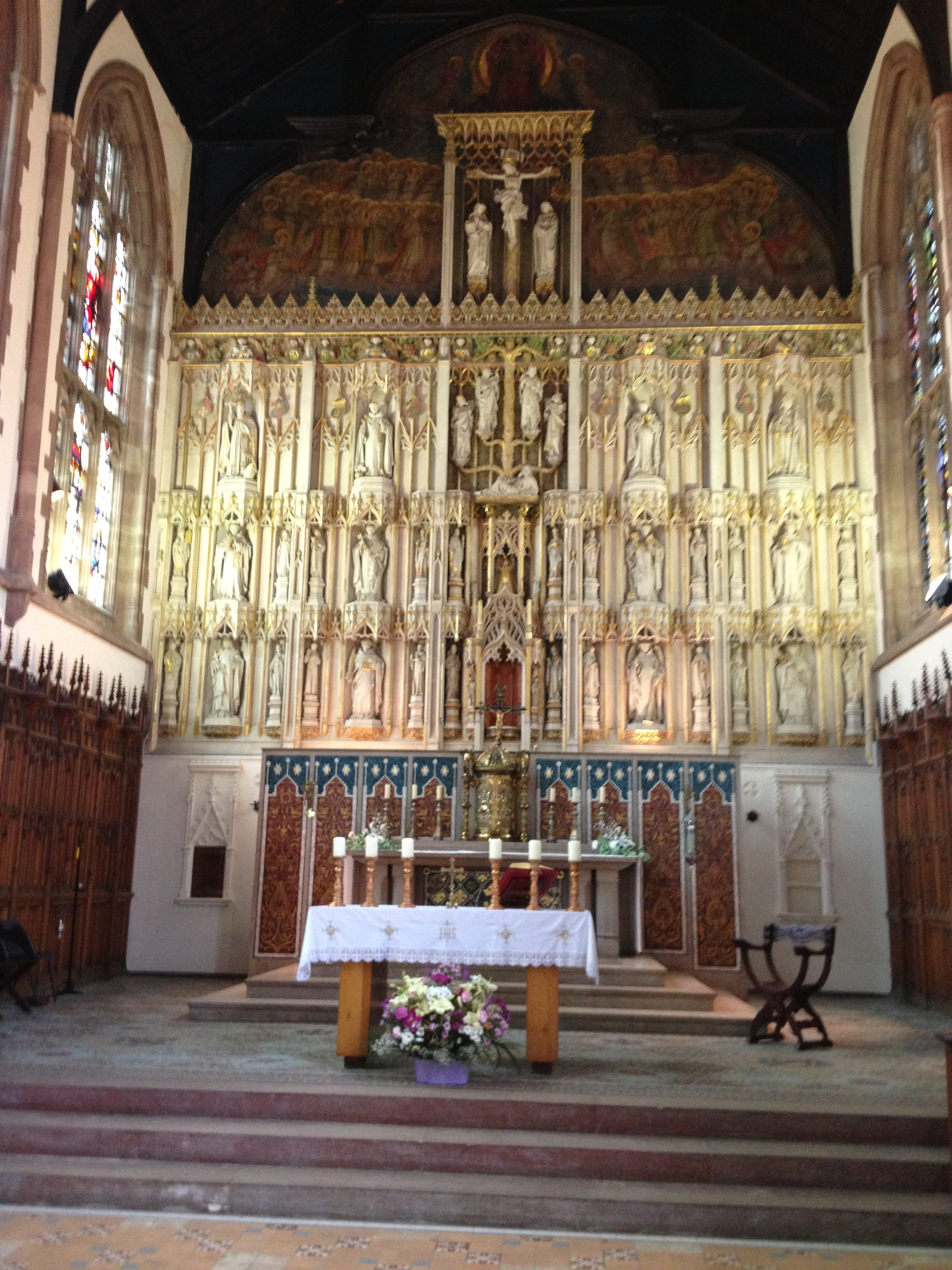
Hawkesyard Priory interior

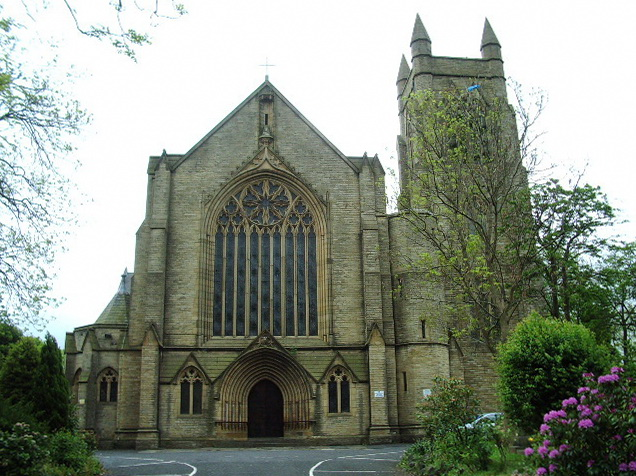
St Alban's Church, Larkhill, Blackburn

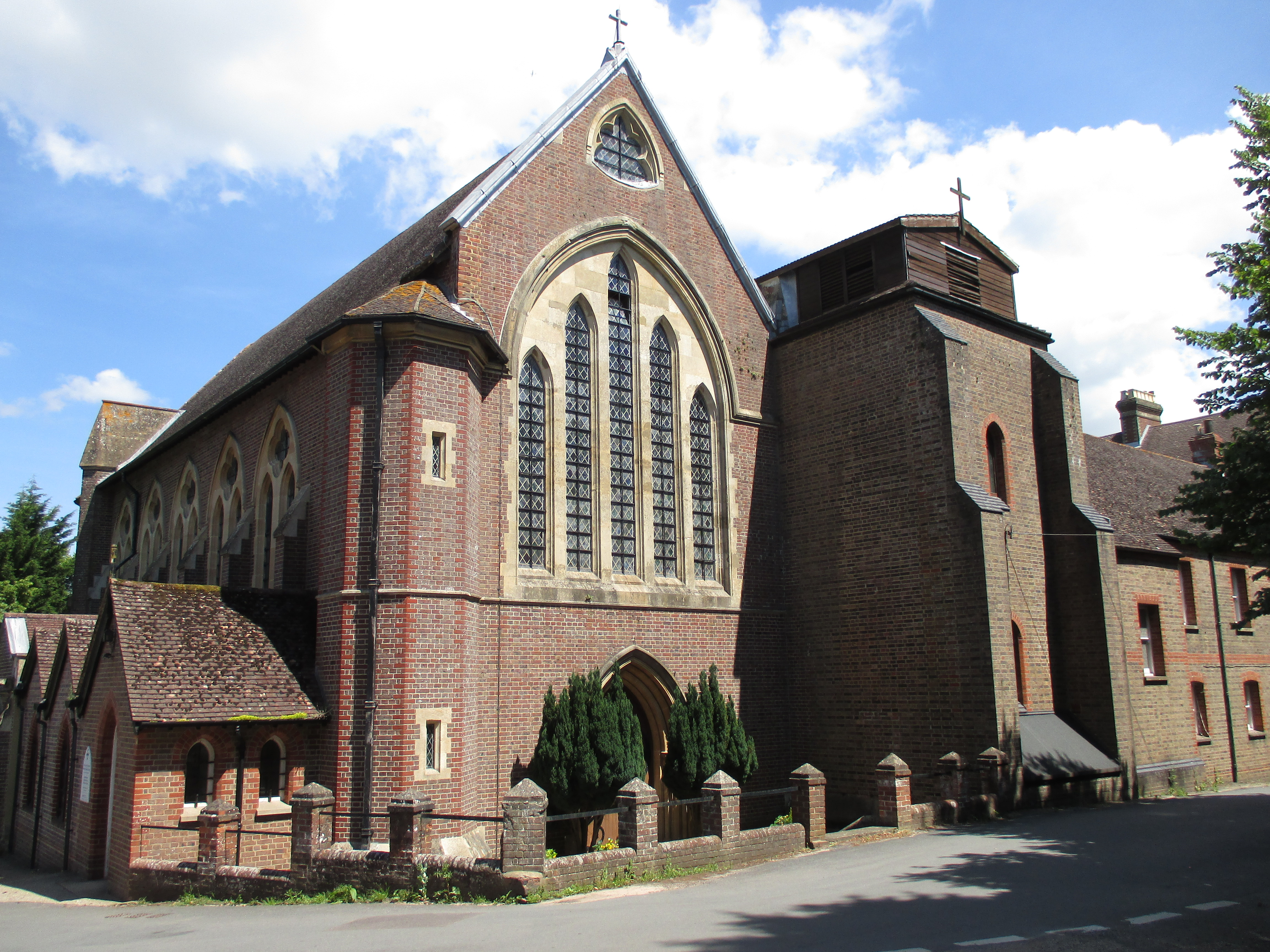
Our Lady of England Priory, Storrington

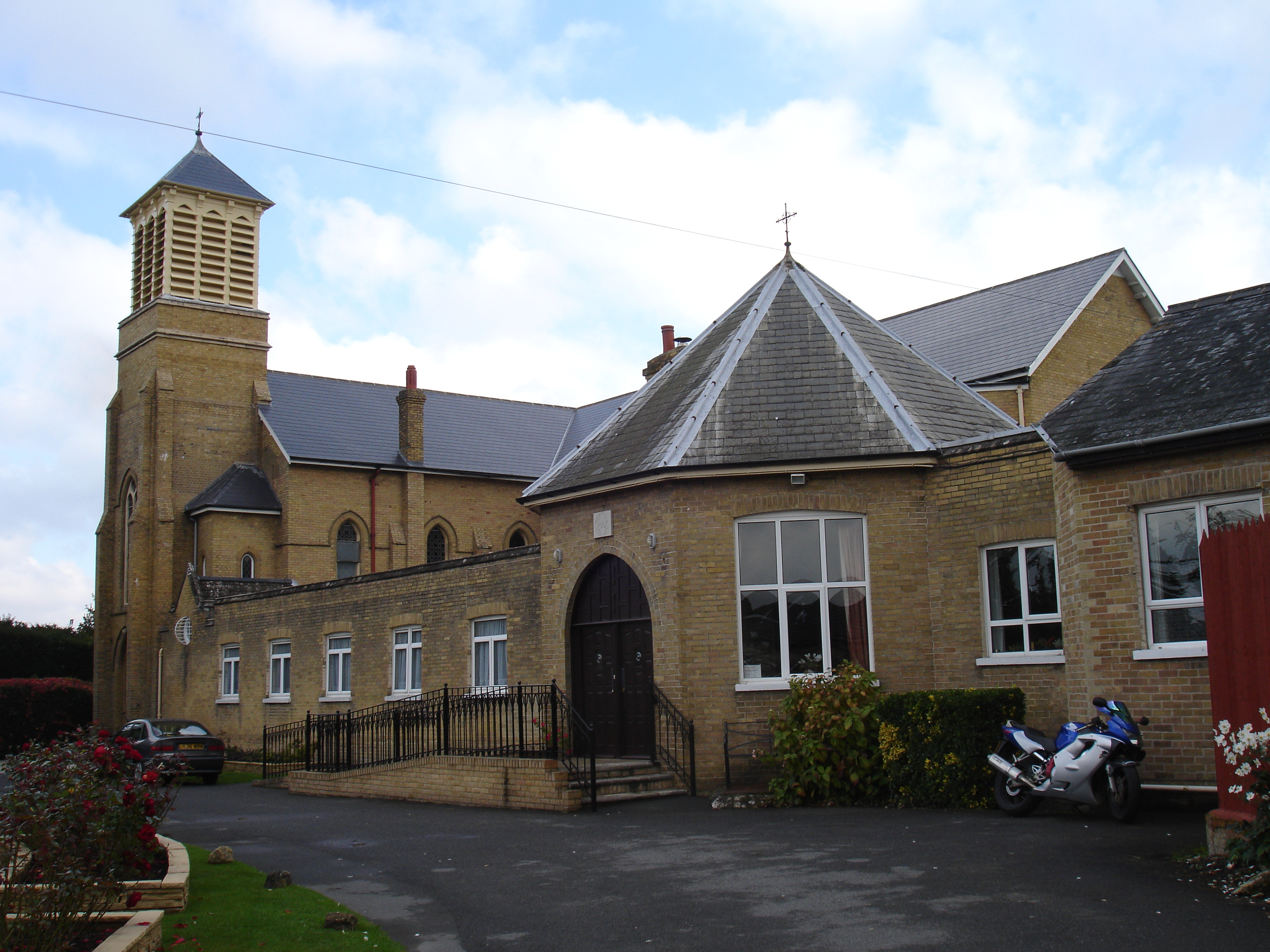
St Cecilia's Abbey, Ryde

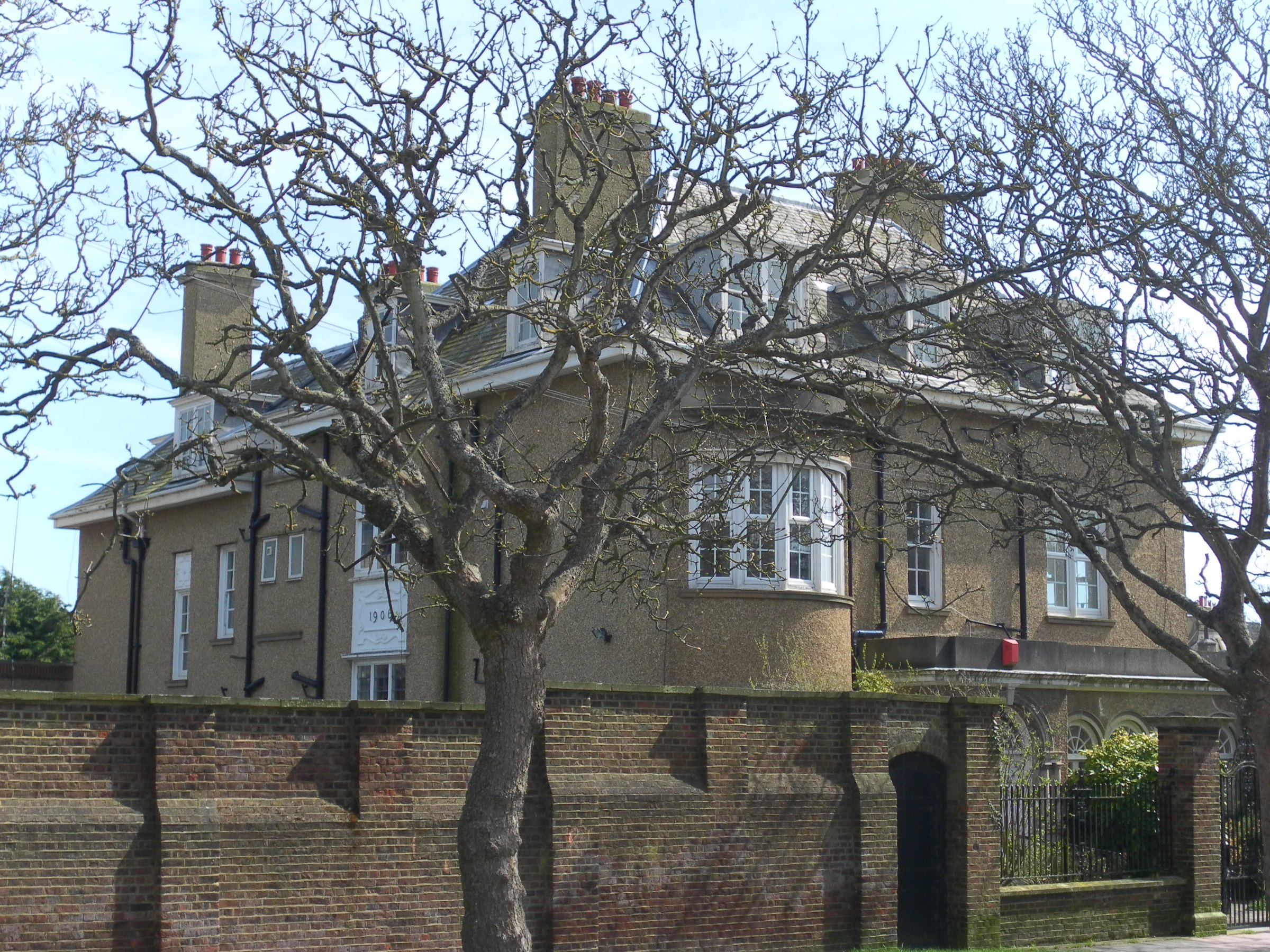
The Lees, Manor Road, Brighton

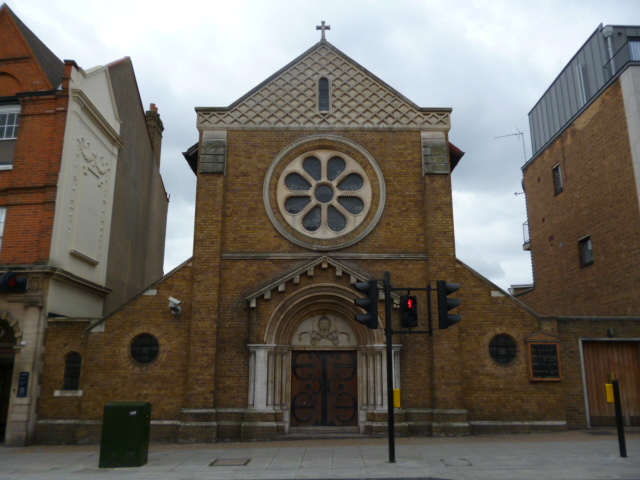
Our Lady of Lourdes Church, Acton

== See also ==
- Church of Our Lady and St Peter, Leatherhead
