= Our Lady of Lourdes Church, Acton =

Our Lady of Lourdes Church
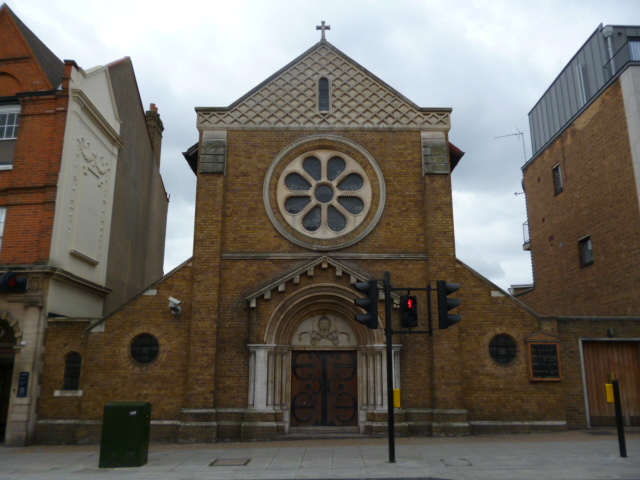
- Front entrance
- Our Lady of Lourdes Church
- 51.5068°N 0.2697°W
- Location: Acton
- Country: England
- Denomination: Catholic
- Website: Official website

History
- Status: Parish church
- Founder(s): Fr James O’Donnell; Fr Charles Rivers
- Dedication: Our Lady of Lourdes

Architecture
- Functional status: Active
- Architect: Edward Goldie
- Style: Romanesque Revival
- Completed: 28 September 1902
- Construction cost: £5000

Administration
- Province: Westminster
- Archdiocese: Westminster
- Deanery: Ealing
- Parish: Our Lady of Lourdes

Our Lady of Lourdes Church is a Roman Catholic parish church in Acton, London. It was built in 1902 and was designed by Edward Goldie in the Romanesque Revival style. It is located on Acton High Street, near Acton Town Hall.

== History ==
=== Foundation ===
After the English Reformation, during the time of recusancy, until the Roman Catholic Relief Act 1829, there were sporadic mentions of people in Acton recorded as Catholic. It was only after 1805 that a consistent Catholic community could be found in the town. From 1805, Nicolas Selby, and the Selby family, housed French nuns, a priest and a chapel in Acton House. Irish workers from Turnham Green would come for Mass in the house. A small chapel on King Street was also built to host public worship, but closed in 1858.

In 1878, a mission was started in Acton. A priest, Fr James O'Donnell, came to minister to the Catholics in the town. From 1880, Mass was being celebrated in a house, 2 Gloucester Villas, Shakespeare Road. In 1882, Our Lady of Grace Church, a temporary church building, made of corrugated iron, was built on Strafford Road. This church continued until the current one was built.

=== Construction ===
In 1892, the site of Our Lady of Lourdes Church on the High Street was purchased. The priest at the time was Fr Charles Rivers. He set about getting the funds together and an architect for a new larger church. The cost of the new church came to £5,000 and he hired Edward Goldie to design the church. Son of George Goldie, Edward Goldie also designed St James's, Spanish Place.

While the previous church was called Our Lady of Grace Church, the new church was decided to be named Our Lady of Lourdes. In 1886, the Church of Our Lady of Grace and St Edward had opened in Chiswick, and Our Lady of Lourdes had officially been endorsed in 1862, so the new church in Acton was called Our Lady of Lourdes.

On 21 September 1902, the old church on Stafford Road was closed, and a week later, on 28 September, the new church was opened. The church was blessed by Fr Rivers in a ceremony attended by the administrator of Westminster Cathedral, Canon Patrick Fenton, who became an auxiliary bishop of Westminster in 1904. The church was built to have a capacity of 500 people.

=== Developments ===
During the decades after its construction, furnishings and statues were added to the church. New benches, oak altar rails, a shrine to the Sacred Heart and statues of saints Patrick and Anthony of Padua were installed. A new font was put in the baptistry and new stations of the cross were made for the church. From 1955, significant changes were made: new marble altars for the church and lady chapel and altar rails replaced the old ones. This main altar was brought forward after the Second Vatican Council.

== Parish ==
The parish is currently administered by priests from the Congregation of the Holy Spirit or Spiritans. There are four Sunday Masses in the church: 7:00pm on Saturday, and 9:00am, 10:30am and 12 noon on Sunday. The parish also founded Acton Homeless Concern, which is housed next to the church in Emmaus House.

== Interior ==
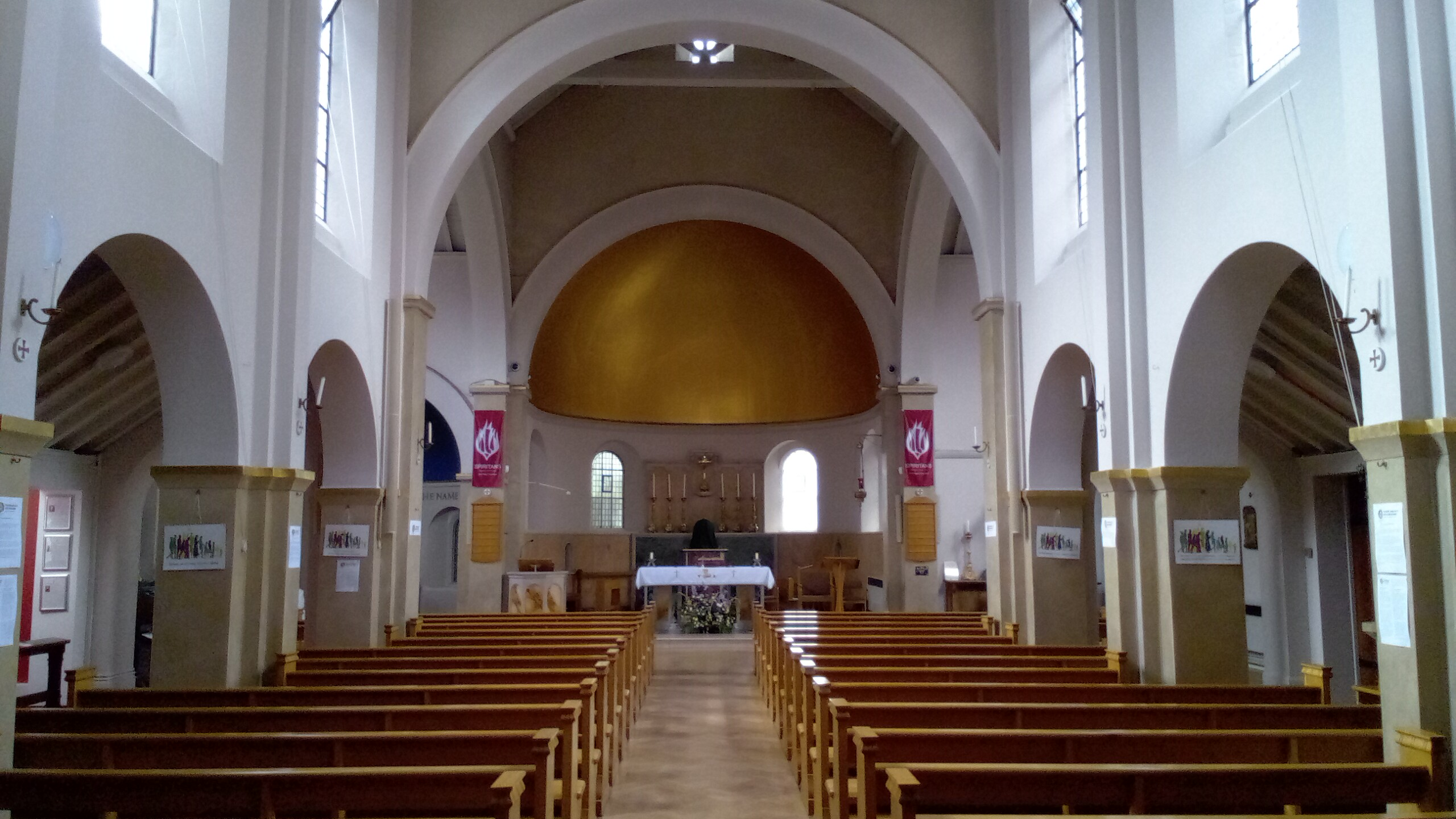
Interior

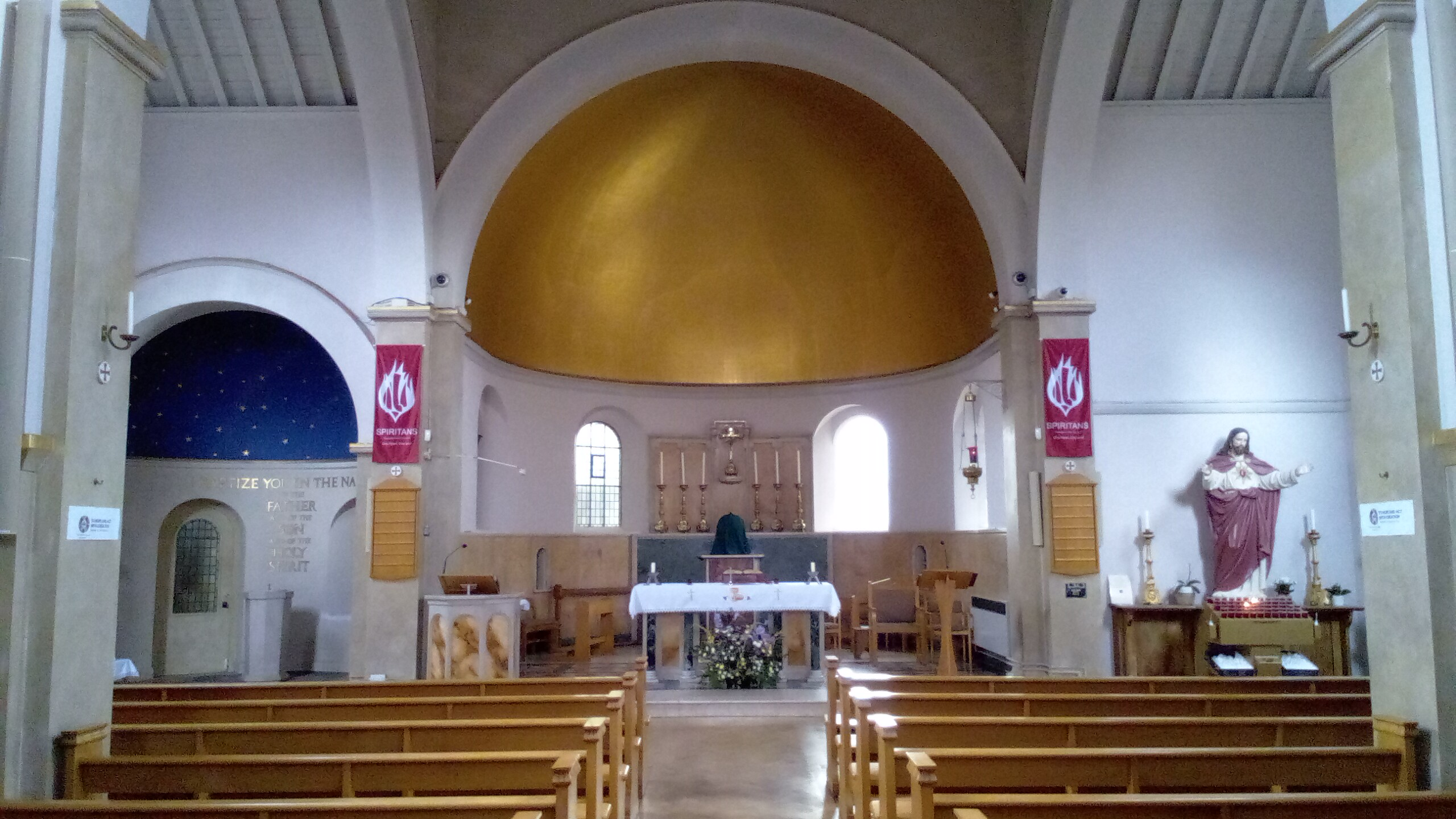
Chancel

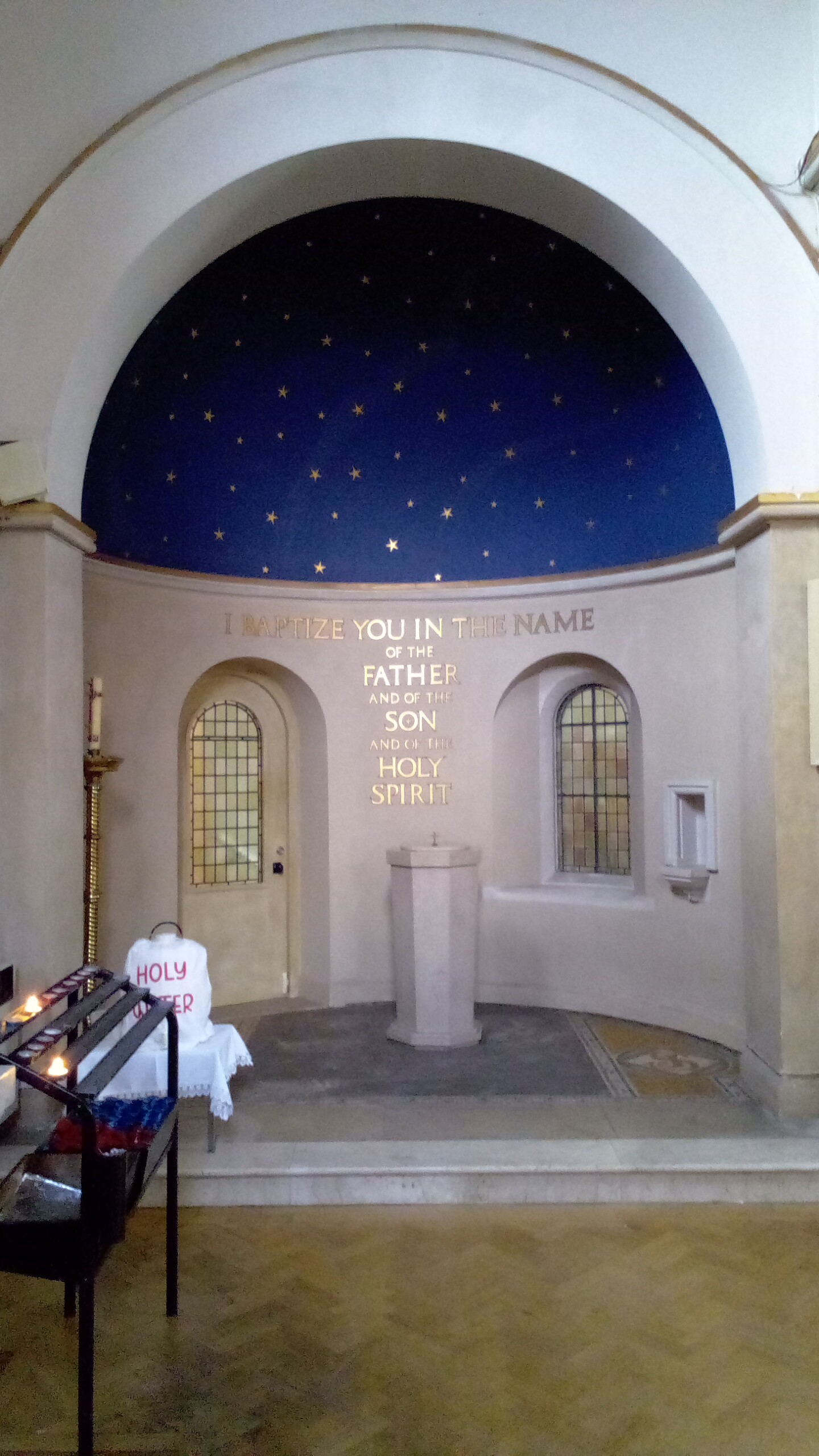
Baptistry

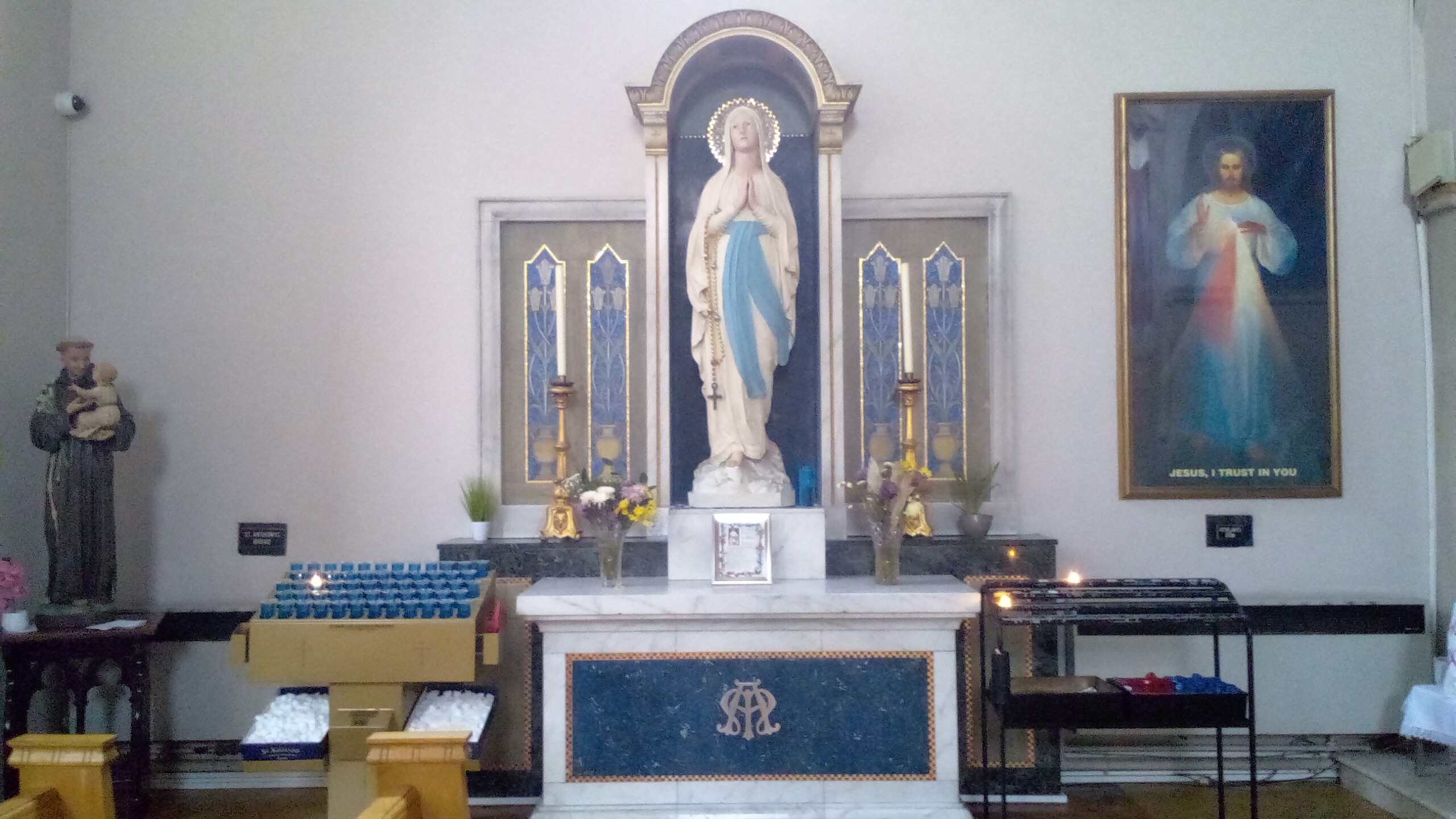
Lady chapel

== See also ==
- St Anselm's Church, Southall
- Ealing Abbey
