= Hassop Hall =

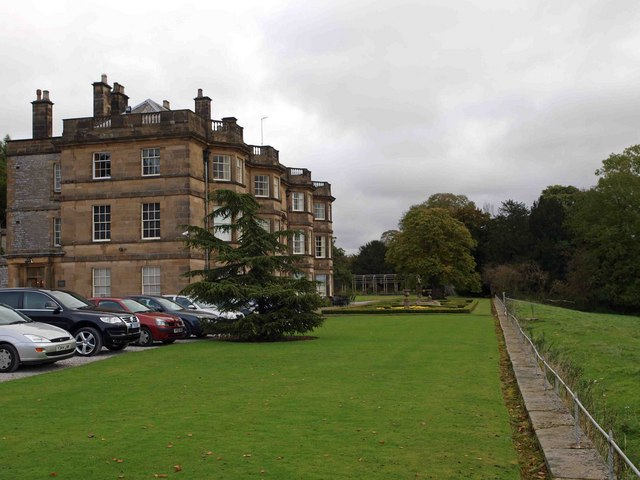
- Hassop Hall in 2008

- Location within Derbyshire

General information
- Location: Bakewell, England
- Coordinates: 53.2468°N 1.6689°W
- Ordnance Survey: SK2219572216
- Construction started: 17th century

Design and construction
- Designations: Grade II listed building

Hassop Hall is a 17th-century country house near Bakewell, Derbyshire, which was operated as a hotel until it closed on 29 September 2019. It is a Grade II* listed building.

== History ==
The Manor was owned by the Foljambe family until the 14th century when it passed by the marriage of Alice Foljambe to Sir Robert Plumpton. His son Sir William Plumpton served as High Sheriff of Derbyshire in 1453. The Plumptons sold the estate in 1498 to Catherine Eyre.

The manor house was substantially rebuilt in the early 17th century by Thomas Eyre. During this period the Eyres were strongly Royalist and during the Civil War the family allowed the Hall to be garrisoned by the King's Army. In 1646 the estate was sequestered by the Commonwealth and Rowland Eyre was obliged to compound at a cost of £21,000 for its return.

The house was rebuilt in about 1774. In 1814 it was inherited by Francis Eyre, who had wrongly claimed the title of 6th Earl of Newburgh. The claim to the earldom was based upon the marriage of Francis Eyre (d. 1804) to Mary Radclyffe, daughter of Charles Radclyffe, 5th Earl of Derwentwater, (3rd son of Edward Radclyffe, 2nd Earl of Derwentwater) and Charlotte Maria Livingstone, 3rd Countess of Newburgh. Although Mary's brother and his son had succeeded as 4th and 5th Earl of Newburgh, Mary's claim (and therefore that of Francis) ultimately proved subordinate to that of a daughter by an earlier marriage.

In 1816–17 Francis Eyre built a Roman Catholic chapel, Church of All Saints, Hassop, next to the entrance lodge of the hall; the design, by Joseph Ireland, was based on that of Inigo Jones' St Paul's Covent Garden. The building was later transferred to the Diocese of Nottingham. From 1827 Eyre altered the house itself considerably, creating a substantial mansion with a south front of three storeys and seven bays alternately canted to full height, and a pedimented Tuscan order doorway.

In 1833 Mary Dorothea Eyre, who married Charles Leslie, inherited the Hassop estate. In 1919 the Leslie family sold it to Sir Henry Stephenson. The Stephenson family sold the house and grounds in 1975 to Thomas Chapman, who converted it into a hotel. Thomas Chapman's sons, Richard and Tom, ran the hotel in later years. The hall was sold to care home owner John Hill and his wife Alex, and returned to private residential use in 2019.

== See also ==
- Grade II* listed buildings in Derbyshire Dales
- Listed buildings in Hassop
