= St Austin's Church, Wakefield =

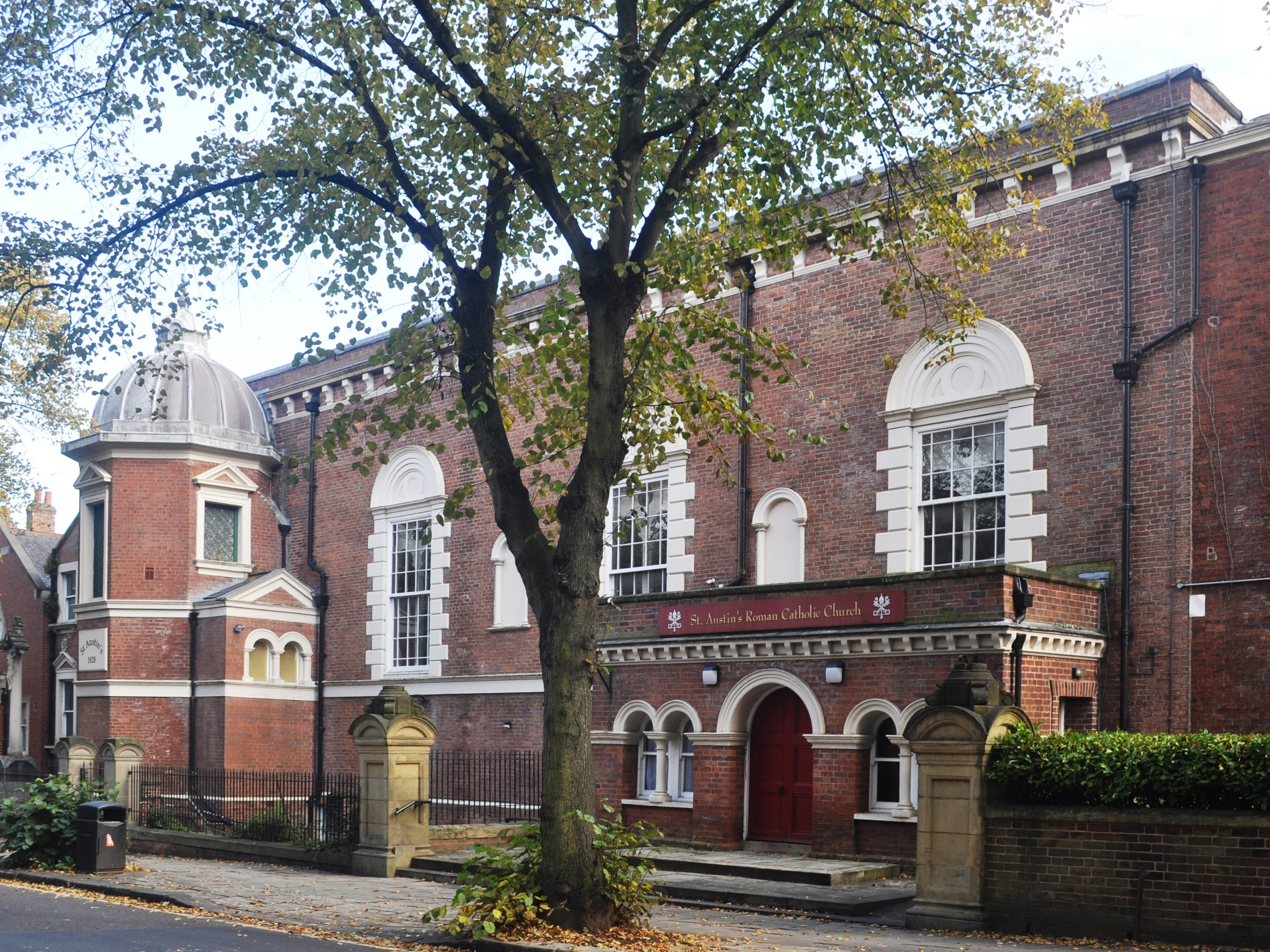
- The church in 2024
- St Austin's Church, Wakefield
- 53.687072°N 1.501813°W
- OS grid reference: SE 32984 21281
- Location: Wakefield
- Country: England
- Denomination: Roman Catholic
- Website: StMartinsWakefield.org

History
- Status: Active
- Founded: 1827

Architecture
- Functional status: Church building
- Heritage designation: Grade II
- Designated: 6 November 1969
- Completed: 1828

Administration
- Province: Liverpool
- Diocese: Leeds
- Deanery: Wakefield & Pontefract
- Parish: St Austin's and English Martyrs

St Austin's Church is a Roman Catholic Church building in Wakefield, England. It is situated near where Northgate meets Marsh Way close to the city centre. It was founded in 1827 by the Society of Jesus and is a Grade II listed building.

== Foundation ==
In 1824, plans were put into motion by the architect Joseph Ireland creating designs for the church. He was previously the architect for the chapel at Houghton Hall and worked with Joseph John Scoles. Two years later, a Jesuit priest, Fr John George Morris SJ, came to the parish to start a mission there. Construction of the church began the next year and on 4 March 1828 by the Vicar Apostolic of the Northern District, Thomas Smith.

== Expansion ==
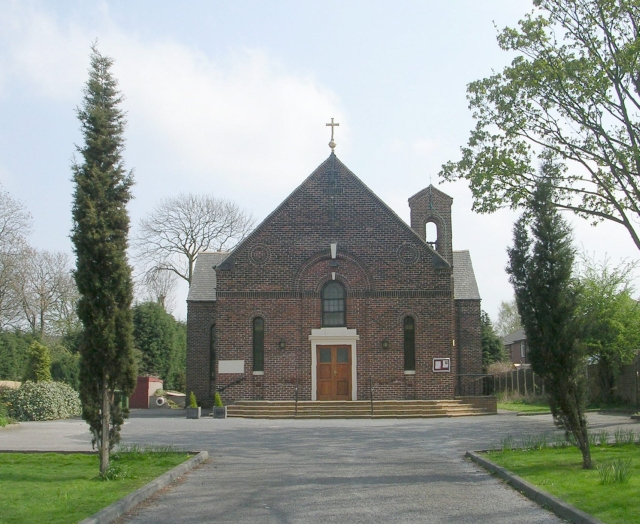
St Ignatius Church, South Ossett

=== Extension ===
In 1852, the Catholic population had increased to such an extent that the church needed to be extended and a school built to cope with larger congregation. The length of the church was increased and a balcony was added. In 1859, foundations for the school were laid. In the 1860s and 1870s the local Catholic population continued to rise and the church was again extended. The presbytery was moved to a separate house so that the church could be extended into the previous one. In 1878, a lady chapel, designed by Joseph Hansom was added to St Austin's.

=== Daughter church ===
In December 1877, the parish need to expand, because numbers were increasing and it was too spread out geographically. It was decided that the Jesuits would build a new chapel, in South Ossett so the Catholics there would not have to travel to Wakefield for Mass every Sunday. The church was St Ignatius and was dedicated to Ignatius of Loyola. It became a church and a parish in 1910 when it was handed over the Diocese of Leeds. The church that replaced the chapel was built in 1933 and it still remains as a parish.

In 1931, the Jesuits handed over St Austin's parish to the Diocese of Leeds who continue to serve the church.

== Parish ==
In 2008, the parish of English Martyrs (created in 1932) merged with St Austin's to form the parish of St Martin de Porres, which was subsequently renamed St Austin's and English Martyrs Parish. St Austin's Church has four Sunday Masses, one on Saturday evening at 6:15 pm, 8:15 am and 11:00 am on Sunday morning at another at 6:00 pm on Sunday evening. English Martyrs Church has one Sunday Mass at 9:30 am.

The two nearby school, St Austin's Catholic Primary School and English Martyrs Catholic Primary School, have a relationship with the parish and both state that they offer "a Catholic education within a Christian community".

== See also ==
- Society of Jesus
- John Wilson (bishop)
