= Joseph Ireland =

English architect (c. 1780-1841)

Joseph Ireland (c. 1780 – 1841) was an English architect who designed Roman Catholic Church buildings in the early nineteenth century. He specialized in Romanesque Revival architecture and worked with Joseph John Scoles.

== Life ==
Ireland was born into a Catholic family from Crofton, near Wakefield. He worked almost entirely for Roman Catholic patrons, notably the Vicar Apostolic of the Midland District, John Milner. From 1812 until 1819, he employed Joseph John Scoles, a relative, as an apprentice.

From 1816 to 1818, he was the architect of Church of All Saints, Hassop, originally built as a private chapel for Hassop Hall and its owner Francis Eyre. The design was based on Inigo Jones' St Paul's Covent Garden. In 1821, he built a Greek-style chapel beside Houghton Hall for Charles Langdale who had inherited the estate.

In 1824, he was behind the initial plans for St Austin's Church in Wakefield. In 1826, the Society of Jesus set up a mission there and building work started on the church the following year. For the next two years, he worked on St Peter and St Paul Church in Wolverhampton and a chapel for the Dominican Order in Hinckley. The priory in Hinckley was the centre for the Dominicans in Britain and the chapel was dedicated to St Peter. It was demolished in 1976.

Other works included Holy Cross Church in Leicester from 1817 to 1819, St Mary's the Mount Church in Walsall in 1825. In 1829 he built a chapel at Tixhall Hall, Staffordshire for the Clifford family; it was dismantled following the sale of the estate in 1840 and rebuilt as St John the Baptist Church at Great Haywood.

Nikolaus Pevsner, when writing about Catholic churches in Staffordshire praised Joseph Ireland writing, "The finest Catholic churches are Late Georgian Classical. They are the churches of Wolverhampton and Walsall, both of 1825-7 ... both by Ireland."

== Churches ==
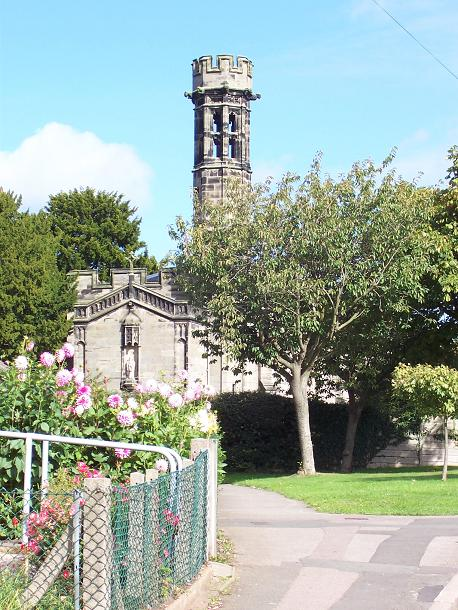
St John the Baptist Church, Great Haywood

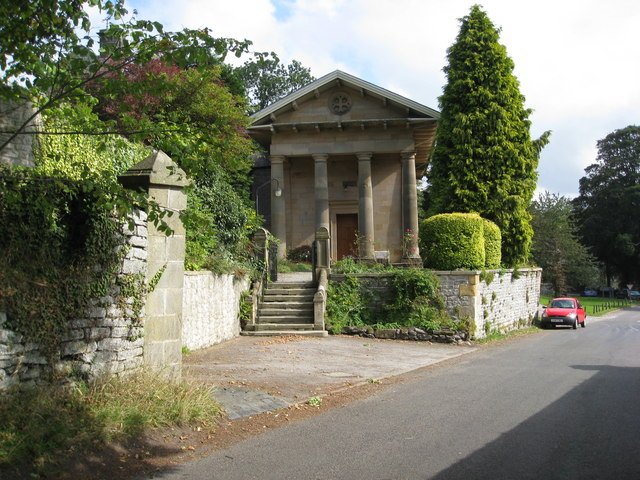
All Saints Church, Hassop

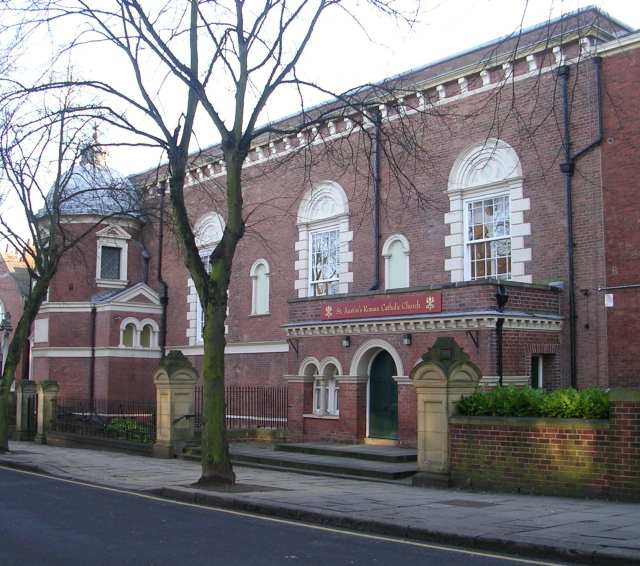
St Austin's Church, Wakefield

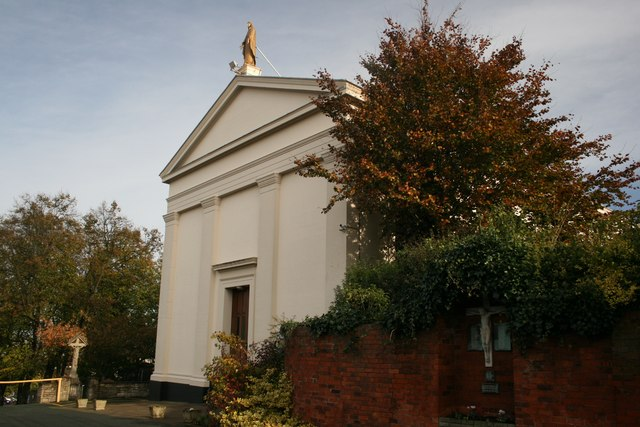
St Mary the Mount Church, Walsall

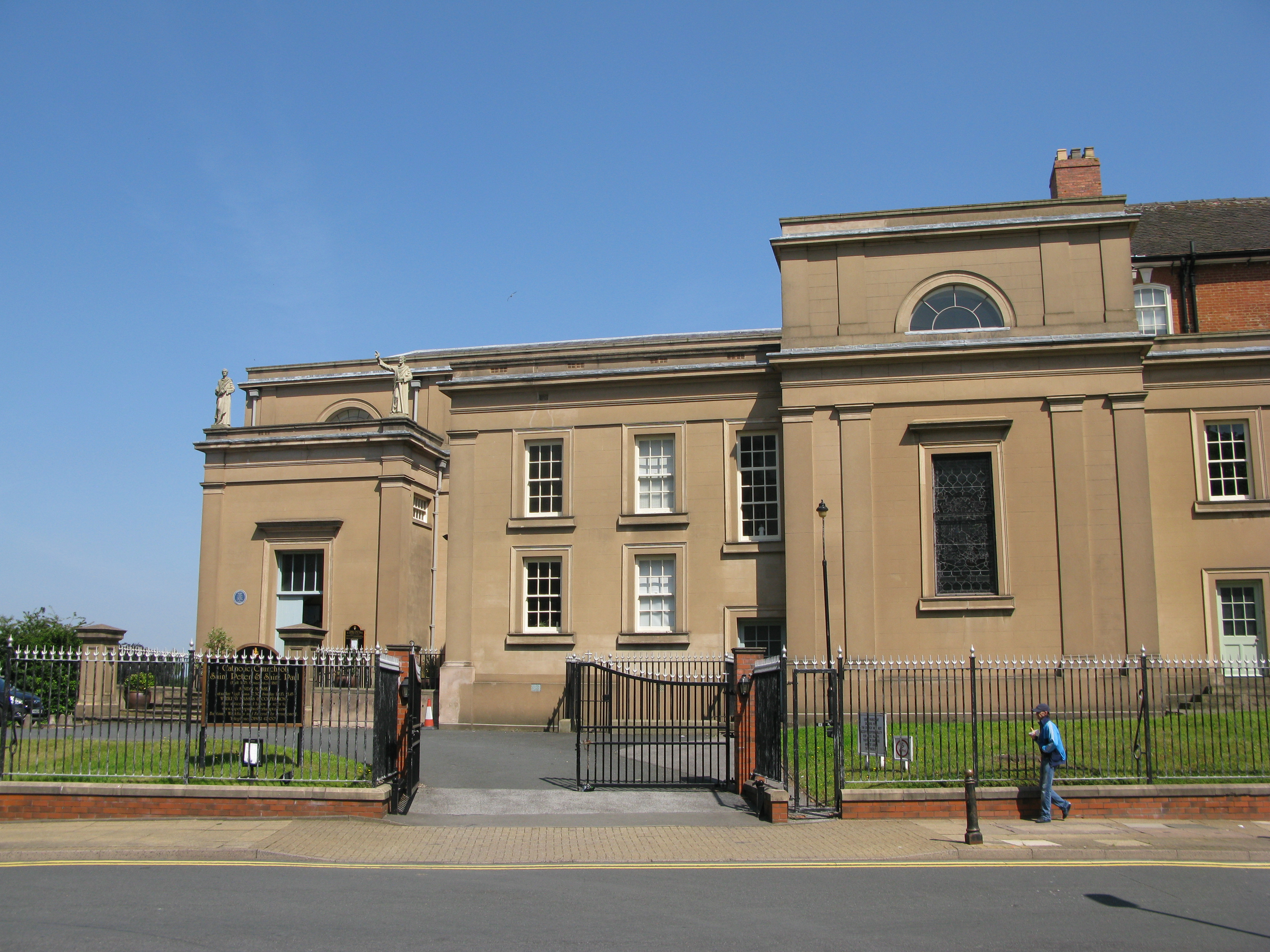
St Peter and St Paul Church, Wolverhampton
- Grace Congregatiobal Church of Harlem, formerly a Presbyterian Church built in 1892

== See also ==
- Joseph John Scoles
- John Milner
