= St Peter and St Paul's Church, Wolverhampton =

St Peter and St Paul Church
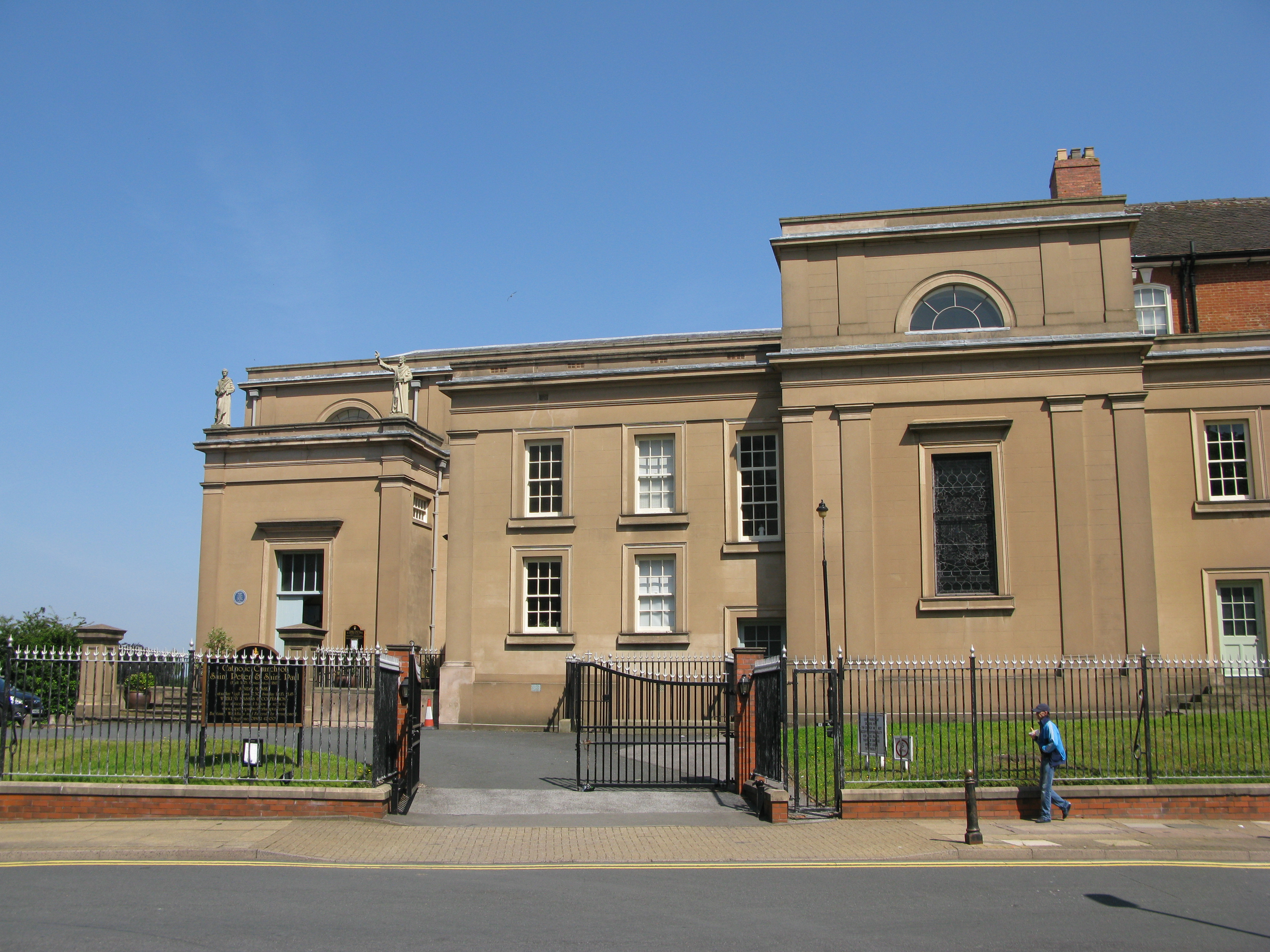
- St Peter and St Paul Church
- 52.5877°N 2.1305°W
- OS grid reference: SO 91255 98883
- Location: Wolverhampton, West Midlands
- Country: England
- Denomination: Roman Catholic
- Website: carloacutis.co.uk

History
- Status: Parish church
- Dedication: Saints Peter and Paul

Architecture
- Functional status: Active
- Heritage designation: Grade II* listed
- Designated: 16 July 1949
- Architect(s): Joseph Ireland and Edward Goldie
- Style: Greek Revival
- Years built: 1826–1828

Administration
- Province: Birmingham
- Archdiocese: Birmingham
- Deanery: Dudley and Wolverhampton

St Peter and St Paul Church is a Roman Catholic Parish church in Wolverhampton, West Midlands, England. It was built from 1826 to 1828, with extensions being built in 1901 and 1928. It was designed by Joseph Ireland and the architect for the extension in 1901 was Edward Goldie. It is built as part of Giffard House, which is now a presbytery for the church. It is situated on Paternoster Row, between Wolverhampton City Council and the Ring Road St Peters. Both the church and Giffard House are a Grade II* listed building.

== History of the building ==
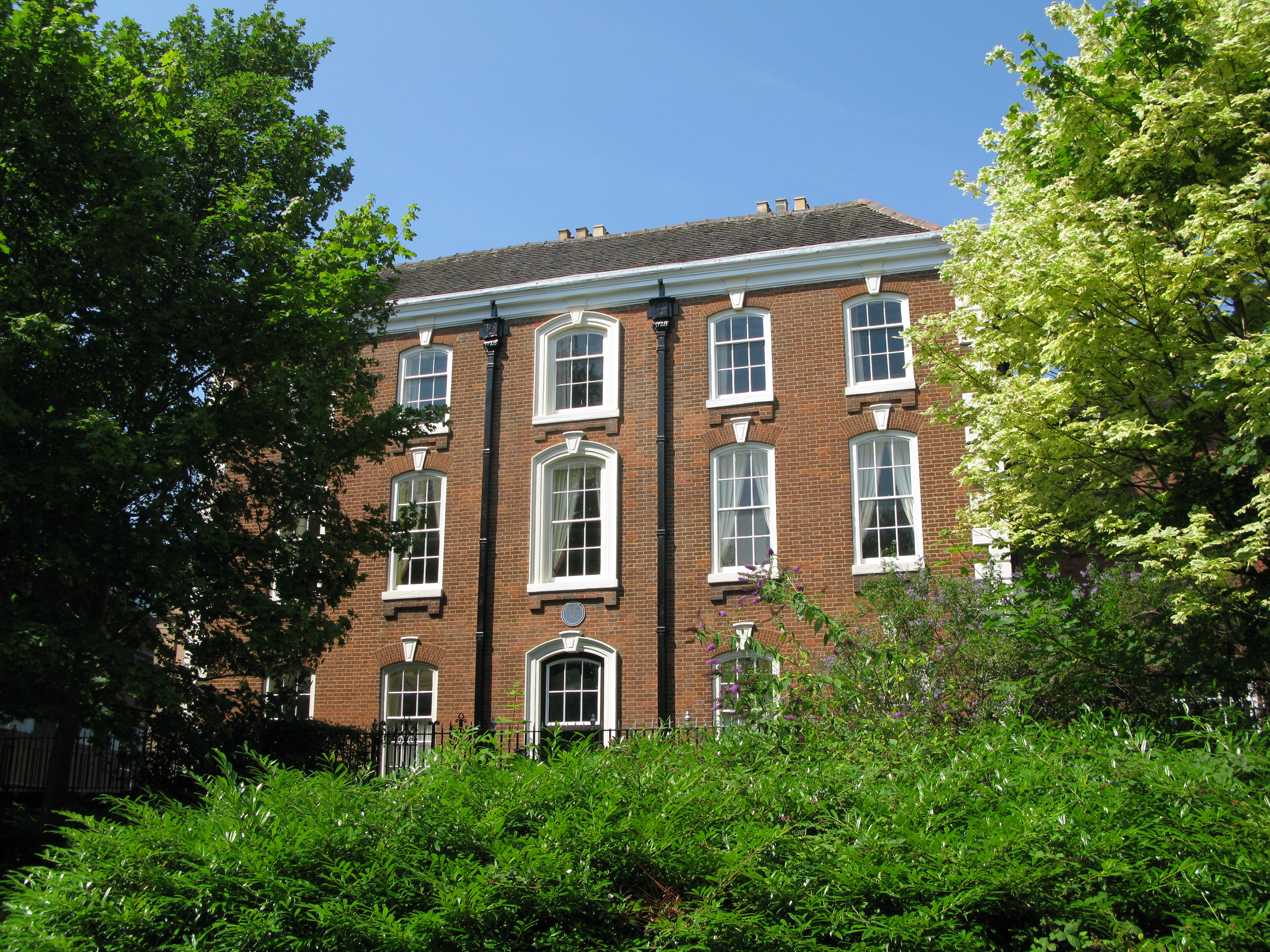
Giffard House

=== Giffard House and Catholic Wolverhampton ===
The Giffard family, who were a Catholic Recusant family, used their house as a home for spinsters or widowed sisters and daughters, who cared for priests and monks and travelling Catholics. During the aftermath of the Gunpowder Plot two Catholics were executed in High Green, Wolverhampton (now known as Queen Square). The church does have a Recusant Chalice from the English Civil War which is still used at Mass.

In 1678, during the reign of Charles II, there was the Titus Oates persecution and two Jesuit Priests were arrested in Wolverhampton, Father Gavin was executed in London and Father Atkins died in Stafford Prison. Peter Giffard was also arrested but survived and a local priest, William Ironmonger was also executed. There were more riots when the last Catholic King James II fled the country in 1688 and William of Orange and his wife Mary became the rulers. The Chapel in Giffard House was attacked and the priest's vestments burnt.

In the 17th century, there were a number of Roman Catholics in Wolverhampton. The town was known as "Little Rome", which was meant as an insult. Local gentry who remained Catholic were, the Giffards, the Levesons (pronounced "Looson") and the Whitgreaves. Bishop Bonaventure Giffard, the Vicar Apostolic of the London District, was the son of Andrew Giffard and Catherine Leveson. The Giffards of Chillington Hall were involved with St Peter and St Paul's Church. The Giffards owned two town houses in Wolverhampton, one was in Cock Street (now called Victoria Street) and one in Tup Street (sometimes Goat Street) and now North Street, and this is now the Presbytery to the attached church.

In the early 18th century, a new house was built on the site of the old one in North Street. The current house was built from 1727 to 1729 and it was designed by Francis Smith of Warwick. From 1804 to 1826, it was the home of the Vicar Apostolic of the Midland District, Bishop John Milner. The house became his place of burial and he bequeathed money for the building of the church.

=== Church building ===
St Peter's and St Paul's Church is the oldest Roman Catholic church building in England, that is, it was created during, and just after the English Reformation. The chapel of the Giffard town house, which was originally just for the Giffard family and their servants, opened to other Catholic worshippers.

The church of St Peter and St Paul as it is now on its current site was built in many stages.

==== Giffard House chapel extension (1743–1765) ====
There was first the chapel, built as a room in the rear of the house. This chapel was then extended in 1743 and decorated in 1765. Bishop Milner lived in Giffard House from 1804 to his death in 1826. His brass memorial designed by Pugin is in the Nave and the Bishop's grave is currently in the crypt, he was originally buried in the orchard where the Ring Road now lies.

==== Joseph Ireland's extension (1826–1828) ====
In 1826 the Chapel was again extended to the design of Joseph Ireland in the Greek Revival style. In 1828, the nave of St Peter and Paul's was completed and the church was opened. The inauguration Mass was attended by approximately 60 priests.. The side Chapels dedicated to Our Lady and the Sacred Heart were not yet built and as it was hidden by the surrounding buildings and only approached by an archway from the road outside. It was reasonably impregnable as far as burglars were concerned, because in James Quirke's M.A. Thesis, he quotes a letter written in defence of one Ann Williams in 1831 at the London Criminal Court. She was facing charges of attempted robbery at the church. James Peck wrote the following letter in her defence:

"As for Ennybody thinking to crack into that place, the might as well think of cracking into Newgate as there is no windows hall around this chapel. It consists of skuy lites and there is but one door, they have got to pass through two more doors which is very strong bard on the inside. It is a thing impossable to think about getting into that place without being found out".

The outcome of the trial is currently unknown.

==== Side chapels ====
There are two side chapels that were built as extensions from the Nave.

===== Sacred Heart Chapel =====
The Sacred Heart Chapel, (or South Chapel) was designed by Edward Goldie in 1901, he also designed the Sacristy wing.

===== Lady Chapel =====
In 1928 the Lady Chapel (or North Chapel) was built and designed by Sandy and Norris.

== Threat of demolition (1962–1982) ==
=== The redevelopment of Wolverhampton (1962) ===
The church, and the school that was there at the time, remained as a centre until 1962 when Father Kavanagh discovered that Wolverhampton City Council wished to demolish it because both the Local Government and National Government wished to redevelop the city. Councillor F. Clapham, the Chair of the Planning Committee, wanted a new Civic Centre built on the site of the church, (he did intend to build a new school and church, in Whitmore Reans). Father Kavanagh organised a committee composed of both Catholics and non-Catholics and Councillor Fletcher, Councillor Stokes and Miss Reidy were members. The Planning Application eventually was defeated.

=== Ring Road troubles (1967–1982) ===
In 1967 the Ring Road was being built and was planned to run through where the church stood. Everything nearby that could be demolished was demolished. The parish was assured that the graveyard was safe but 42 bodies were disinterred and moved to Jeffcock Road so that a new retaining wall could be built. It was then discovered that the church roof had dry rot and scaffolding was erected. Father Molloy was now the Priest and he was forced to say Mass in the school hall.

In July 1967, the Wolverhampton Express and Star reported that the house was not affected by the dry rot. The Archdiocese applied for a demolition order as they thought that the cost of repair was too high and they also conjectured that no one would come as: "the Church is cut off by the Ring Road and the Parishioner's homes were quite far from the town centre". A new church was to be built, possibly in Gatis Street, Whitmore Reans. The money would come from selling the land where the church and the House stood and an office block was to be built on the site. This time Wolverhampton Council and a new Church Committee worked together and the proposal for demolition was rejected in 1982 by the Secretary of State for the Environment (Michael Heseltine M.P.).

Grants were obtained from the Council and from English Heritage. The Appeal Secretary was Birmingham University Librarian Anthony Nicholls (who was a parishioner at St Mary and St John). Peter Giffard of Chillington was as involved as his ancestors had been. Father Joyce was the priest with Maurice Couve de Murville as the Archbishop of Birmingham.

== Refurbishment (2006) ==
By 2006, a complete refurbishment of the Church was needed. The church received a large amount of money from the will of the Armstrong brothers. Father Patrick Daly organised a Finance Committee under the guidance of Brian Middleton (and then Mrs Betty Green when Brian became ill); work then commenced. Bill Finnegan helped to co-ordinate the craftsmen. The architect was Stephen Oliver and the project was co-ordinated by Father Patrick Daly.

== Parish ==
The church currently has one Sunday Mass at 10:15 am on Sunday morning.

As well as being a presbytery, Giffard House is also the home of the University of Wolverhampton's Catholic Chaplaincy. The Catholic Society meets at the house every Tuesday at 7:00 pm during term time.

== See also ==
- Roman Catholic Archdiocese of Birmingham
