= St Anselm's Church, Southall =

Coordinates: 51.503729°N 0.380541°W

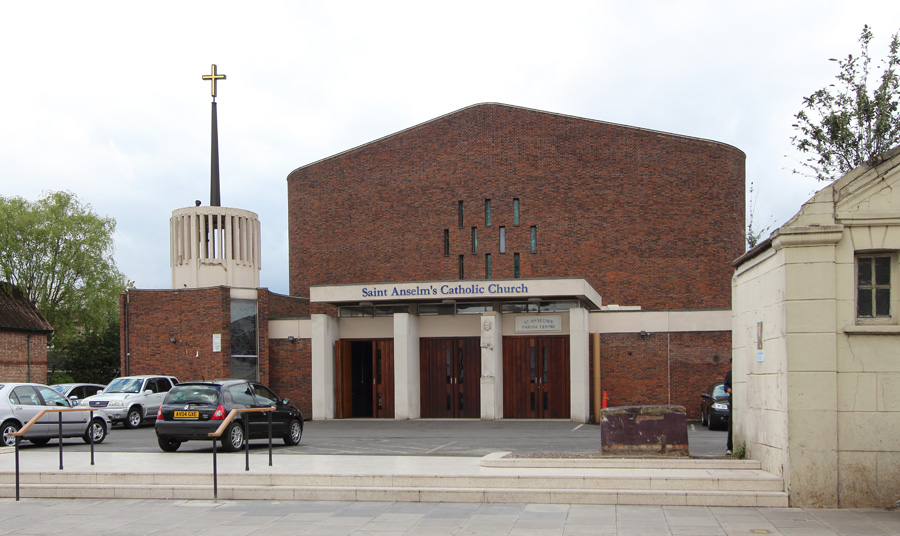
- View of church entrance

- Location of church within Ealing, London
- OS grid reference: TQ1698490416
- Location: Southall, London
- Country: England
- Denomination: Roman Catholic
- Website: StAnselmChurchSouthall.com

History
- Status: Active
- Founded: 1906
- Dedication: St Anselm of Canterbury

Architecture
- Functional status: Parish Church
- Architect(s): Burles, Newton & Partners
- Groundbreaking: 17 June 1967
- Completed: 20 April 1968
- Construction cost: £120,000

Administration
- Province: Westminster
- Archdiocese: Westminster
- Deanery: Ealing

St Anselm's Church in Southall is a Roman Catholic parish church served by the Society of Jesus in the London Borough of Ealing within the administration of the Archdiocese of Westminster. It is situated on The Green, a main thoroughfare into Southall. Built from 1967 to 1968, it has stained glass windows designed by Patrick Reyntiens and Jerzy Faczynski. The parish was home to the De Nobili Dialogue Centre; a Jesuit building for inter-religious dialogue. It is also the only Catholic church in Southall and the parish has more than fifty nationalities represented in the congregation.

== History ==
=== Foundation ===
During the time of recusancy, from the time of the English Reformation until the Roman Catholic Relief Act 1829, Catholics were recorded to be living in Southall. In 1768, the burial register of St Mary's Church in Norwood Green, recorded that "Mary widow of Cornelius Vanlewan, papist aged 54 years" died in the parish. In 1807, the local Anglican priest wrote that a Catholic priest, Dr Collins, was living in the area and had started a school in the manor.

From 1906, when the parish began, to the present church, St Anselm's has been in three different church buildings. The first St Anselm's church in Southall was situated in a tithe barn of Southall Manor House.

=== School and church building ===
In 1919, the parish priest was Fr William M. Buckle. He sought the funding and building of a church and school to accommodate the growing congregation. That year, he placed a full-page advert in The Tablet calling for donations to build a church and school with the title "Save us at Southall or we Perish". A year later in 1920, a new church and school building was opened. The church was dedicated to Saint Anselm, as he had a manor in neighbouring Hayes from 1095 and travelled through Southall to reach it. The building in 1920 was constructed in two halves. One half was the church, the other was a hall that housed a small mixed junior school. As the size of the school increased, in 1930, a new church was opened. This was built beside the school and was a long, low, brick building with a separate small wooden bell tower.

=== Construction ===
In 1932, Fr Leo A. Ward succeeded Fr Buckle as parish priest. With the church again needing to be enlarged, Fr Ward set about the building of the current church. On 17 June 1967, the foundation stone was laid by Bishop Patrick Casey. On 23 March 1968 the church was blessed. On 20 April 1968 it was opened by Cardinal John Heenan. The church was designed by John Newton of the firm Burles, Newton & Partners, and has stained glass windows designed by Patrick Reyntiens. Jerzy Faczynski, who also did the stained glass in St Ambrose's Church, Speke, designed the windows in the side chapels. The old church became the school hall. From 2001, priests from the Society of Jesus have been serving the parish. Nearby, they started the De Nobili Dialogue Centre, a centre for inter-religious dialogue. Named after Roberto de Nobili, it provided a space for different faiths to meet in prayer and dialogue. It was also associated with the Centre for Christianity and Interreligious Dialogue at Heythrop College, University of London.

== Parish ==
=== Groups ===
The church is involved with the West London branch of Citizens UK. Also, resident in the parish is a community of the Missionaries of Charity who work with the poor in the area. Hope for Southall Street Homeless is based in and around the church and the parish centre.

=== School ===
The parish enjoys a close relationship with the nearby St Anselm's Catholic Primary School. Different school year groups celebrate Mass each term and they also have regular Masses which are celebrated by the whole school throughout the year.

== Interior ==
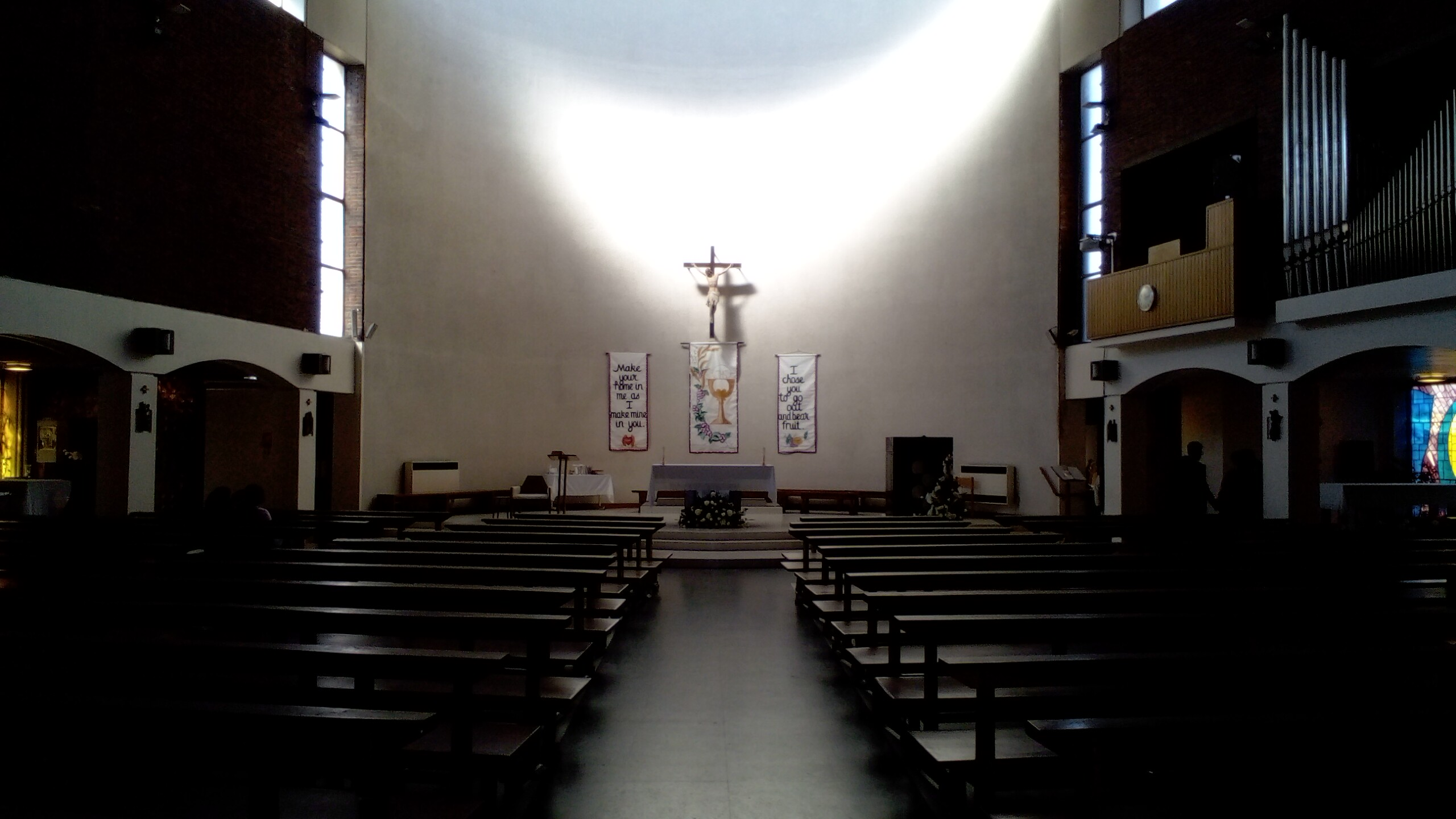
Interior

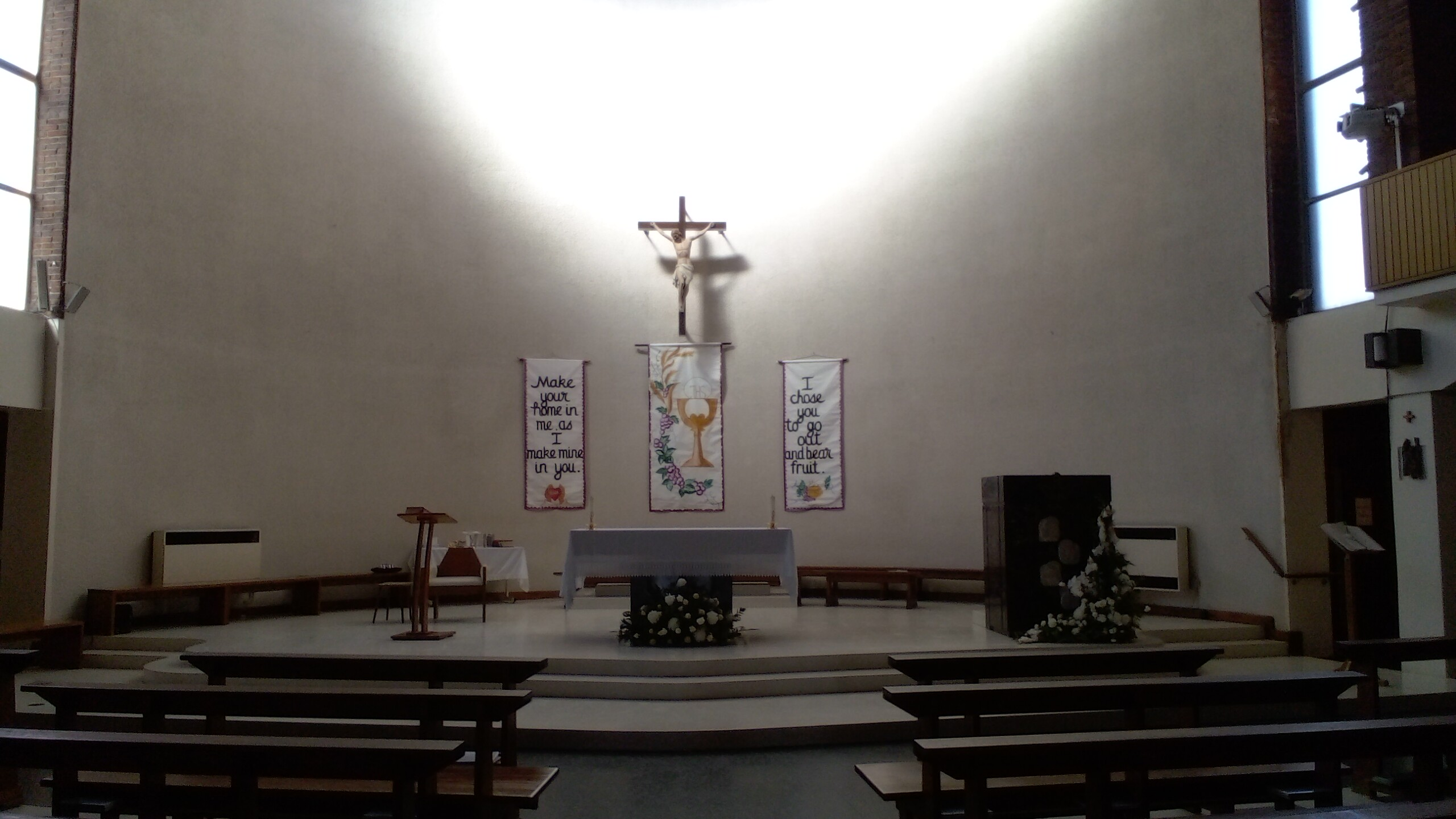
Sanctuary

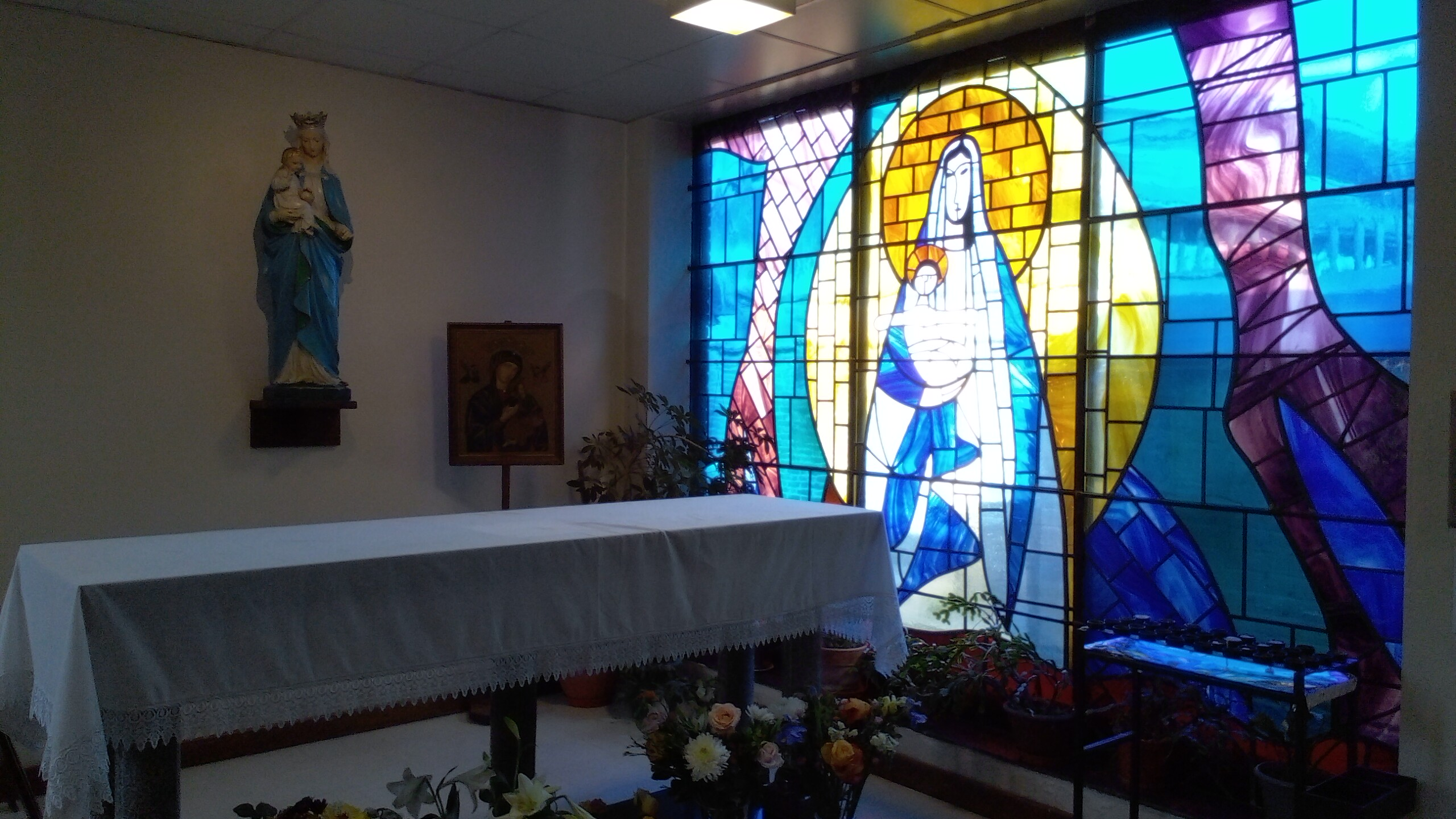
Lady chapel

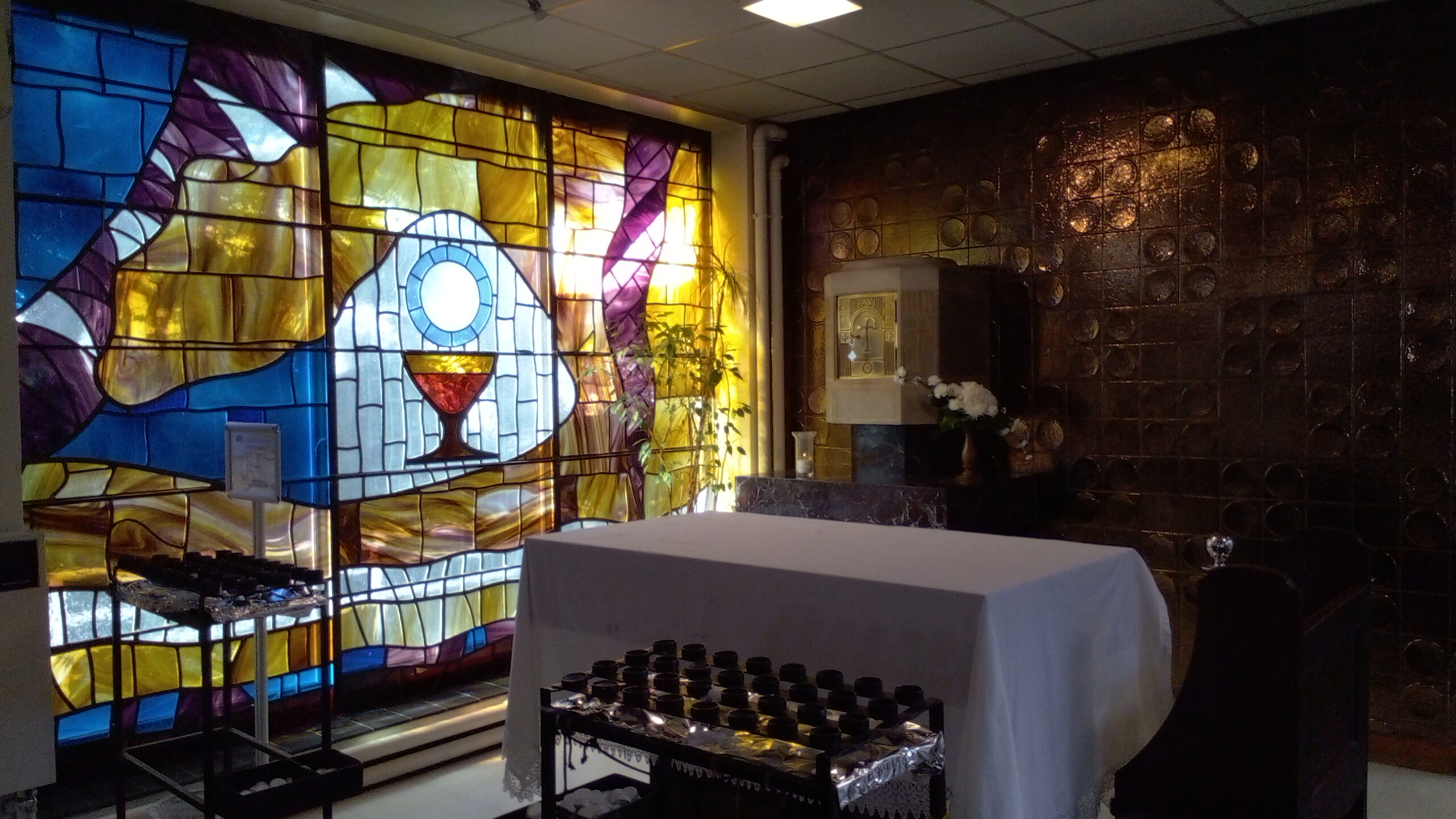
Blessed sacrament chapel

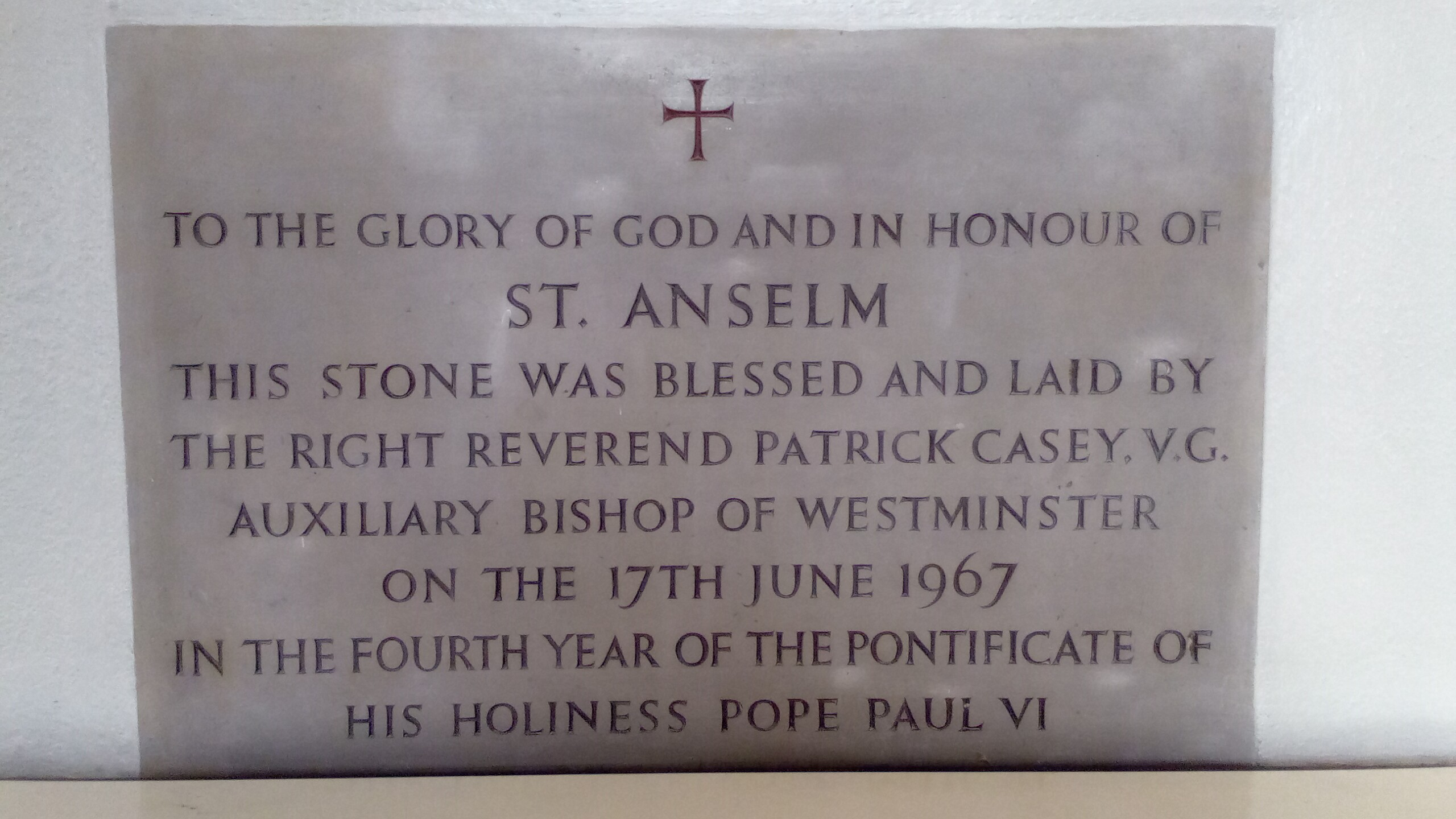
Foundation stone

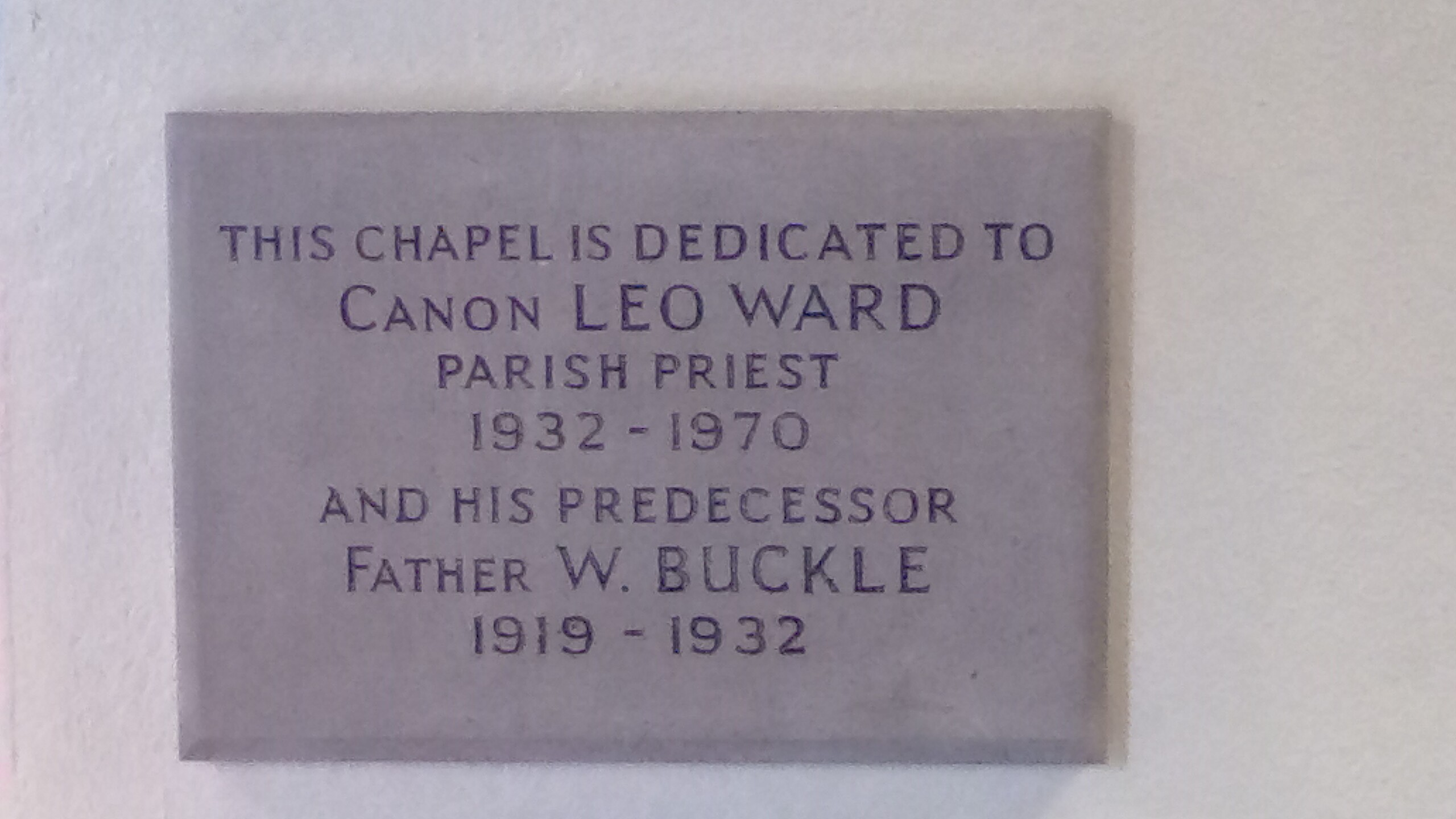
Plaque in lady chapel

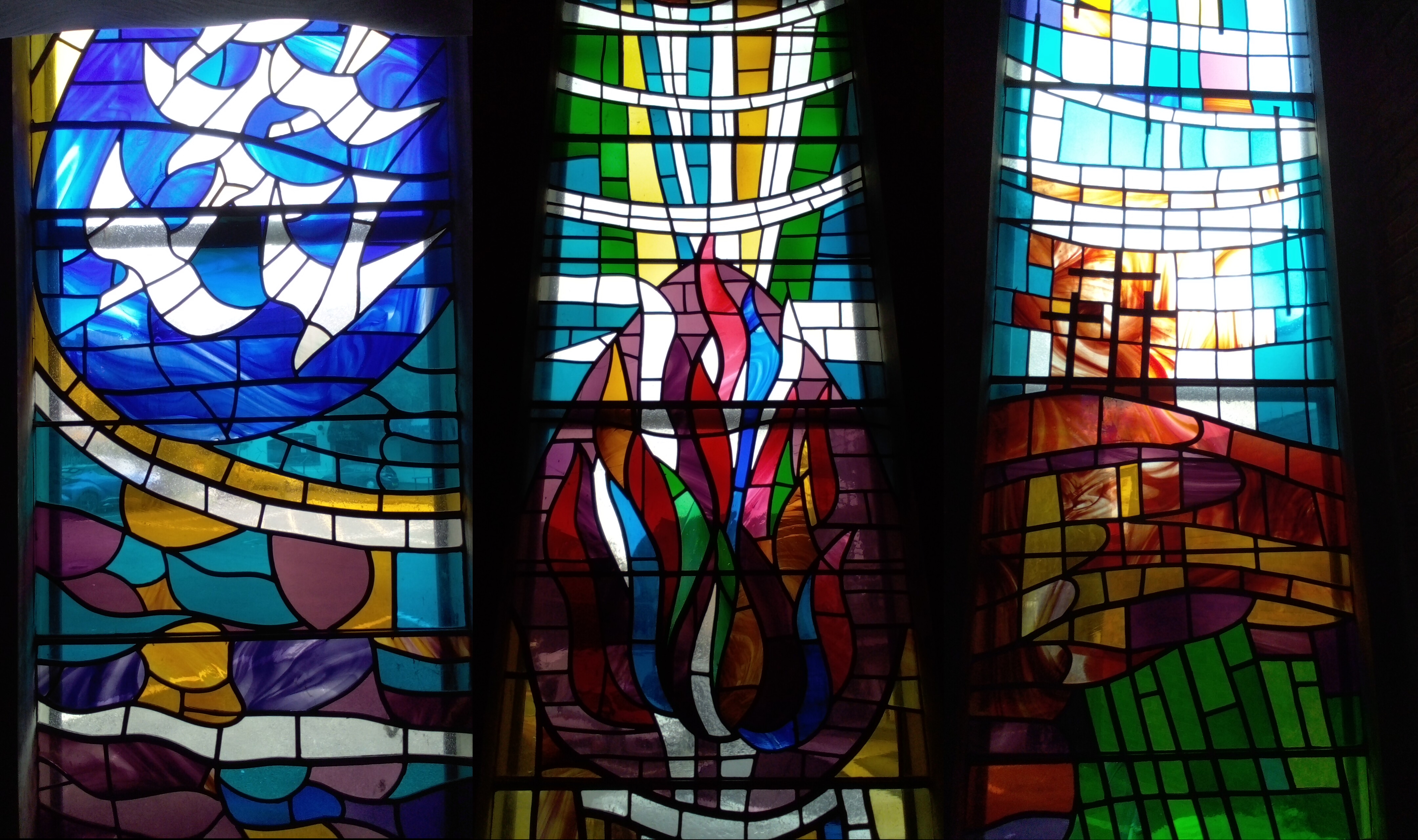
Windows in baptistry

== See also ==
- List of Jesuit sites in the United Kingdom
- List of Catholic churches in the United Kingdom
