= Allerton (surname) =

Allerton is a surname. Notable people with the name include:

- Elanor Allerton (born 1639, date of death unknown), American colonist
- Isaac Allerton, pilgrim on the Mayflower
- Isaac Allerton Jr., son of Isaac Allerton
- Jeremy Allerton (born 1944), English cricketer
- John Allerton, pilgrim on the Mayflower
- Mary Allerton (c. 1616–1699), pilgrim on the Mayflower
- Mary Allerton (1897–1985), pen name of Christine N. Govan
- Robert Allerton (1873–1964), American philanthropist

== See also ==
- Allerton (disambiguation)
