= Yuken Europe =

British advanced manufacturing and hydraulic technology company

- Founded: 1979
- Area served: Europe

Yuken Europe is an advanced manufacturing and hydraulic technology company based in the Speke area of Liverpool, on Merseyside, in the United Kingdom. It serves markets in the UK, Europe and Africa.

It was founded as Yuken UK in 1979 and is wholly owned by the global Japanese group, Yuken Kogyo, whose history dates back as far as 1928. It has affiliated companies in Hong Kong, three in China, Taiwan, South Korea, Thailand and India.

After its formation in 1979, Yuken UK acted solely as an assembler and distributor of hydraulic pumps, controls and valves which had been shipped in from the parent company in Japan. It continued performing this function until 2004 when it began designing bespoke hydraulic products and technology for customers.

Current general manager Mannie Saunders, who has been in the post since 2000, started with the company in 1981 as an apprentice after reading business studies at the then Liverpool Polytechnic.

== Manufacturing ==
Yuken Europe specialises in designing, building and distributing pumps, controls and valves using hydraulic technology. It produces its own line of products and also designs and builds new devices for customers on a bespoke basis. Its products are used by original equipment manufacturers working in a diverse range of sectors including shipping, ferries, construction and subsea. Its products can be found in machines which perform a variety of functions such as chocolate makers and contact lens manufacturing equipment.

Yuken Europe is based on Speke Hall Industrial Estate where it employs circa 20 staff. The plant in Liverpool is used for manufacturing, testing and development of new products. In 2013, Yuken invested a five-figure sum into a new laboratory at its base in Speke to test servo valves. This technology is used in extreme precision engineering to provide control for fast operating machines which carry out highly precise movements. The laboratory allows engineers to diagnose and repair faults with servo valves made by Yuken and other companies.

Yuken Europe has a relationship with Combilift, the Ireland-based manufacturer of industrial forklift truck vehicles.

It also has a subsidiary company, Yuken CZ Sro, based in Rakovník near Prague, which it opened in 2012 in order to expand into the Czech Republic.

It signed a new distribution deal with Basque Country company Diprax to expand its presence in the Spanish market in 2013.
