= Grade II listed buildings in Liverpool-L24 =

Liverpool is a city and port in Merseyside, England, which contains many listed buildings. A listed building is a structure designated by English Heritage of being of architectural and/or of historical importance and, as such, is included in the National Heritage List for England. There are three grades of listing, according to the degree of importance of the structure. Grade I includes those buildings that are of "exceptional interest, sometimes considered to be internationally important"; the buildings in Grade II* are "particularly important buildings of more than special interest"; and those in Grade II are "nationally important and of special interest". Very few buildings are included in Grade I — only 2.5% of the total. Grade II* buildings represent 5.5% of the total, while the great majority, 92%, are included in Grade II.

Liverpool contains more than 1,550 listed buildings, of which 28 are in Grade I, 109 in Grade II*, and the rest in Grade II. (Note: These figures are taken from a search in the National Heritage List for England in May 2013, and are subject to variation as further buildings are listed, grades are revised, or buildings are delisted.) This list contains the Grade II listed buildings in the L24 postal district of Liverpool. The district lies to the south of the centre of the city, and includes the area of Speke. It contains industrial estates, housing estates, and Liverpool John Lennon Airport. Its most important historical building is the Grade I listed Speke Hall. Five of the structures in this list are associated with the hall. The other listed buildings are two churches, a lychgate, a former school, houses, gate piers from a former airport, and a farmhouse.

Grade II listed buildings from other areas in the city can be found through the box on the right, along with the lists of the Grade I and Grade II* buildings in the city.

== Buildings ==
Name	Location	Photograph	Built	Notes
All Saints Church	Hale Road; 53.3440°N 2.8579°W		1872–75	The church was designed by J. L. Pearson. It is built in stone with a tiled roof. The church consists of a nave, a north aisle, a north transept, and a chancel with a north vestry. At the south west is a tower with a stair turret and a broach spire. The style has Decorated details, with Geometric tracery in some of the windows.
Lychgate, All Saints Church	Hale Road; 53.34393°N 2.85826°W		c. 1876	The lychgate is built in timber on stone walls. It has a hipped roof with gablets; it is shingled with tiles on the crest. On the sides are bracketed eaves.
30–34 Hale Road	30–34 Hale Road; 53.3436°N 2.8581°W		Late 18th century	A row of three brick houses with stone dressings and a slate roof. They are in two storeys. The central house projects forward and has three bays; the other houses have one bay. Most windows are sliding-sashes; the others are casements. The central door is in a round-headed recess.
St Ambrose's Church	Heathgate Avenue; 53.3402°N 2.8269°W		1959–61	A Roman Catholic church designed by Alfred Bullen. It has a rectangular plan, it is constructed on a reinforced concrete frame, and it has brick cladding. On the entrance front is a central campanile with a baptistry in its base. Around the upper parts on all sides are windows set in arcades. Inside the church is a free-standing altar.
Yew Tree Farmhouse	Oglet Lane; 53.32978°N 2.83726°W		Early 19th century	The only listed building in Oglet. The farmhouse is built in brick with stone dressings and a slate roof. It is in three storeys with a two-bay front. The windows are small-paned casements under segmental heads. The entrance is in the centre and has a 20th-century timber porch.
Village Hall	Speke Church Road; 53.3443°N 2.8590°W		c. 1870s	This originated as a school and was later converted into use as a village hall. It is built in stone with a tiled roof. The building is in a single storey, with a projecting gabled bay on the right containing a four-light window. There are similar windows on the sides of the building. To the left of the gabled bay is a porch, also gabled, with decorative bargeboards. On the left end of the building is a flèche with an open timber stage and a lead spirelet.
Bridge over moat (north)	Speke Hall; 53.33705°N 2.87393°W		Uncertain	The bridge leads to the main entrance to the hall. It includes two cutwaters with ball finials, one of which is carved with a face. There are seats on each side of the bridge.
Bridge over moat (east)	Speke Hall; 53.33660°N 2.87342°W		Uncertain	The bridge crosses the moat to the east of the hall. It is in stone.
North Lodge	Speke Hall; 53.34180°N 2.86812°W		1867–68	The lodge at the entrance to the drive was designed by Thomas Shelmerdine. It is a stuccoed building painted to resemble timber-framing. It has a T-shaped plan, with a porch in the angle, and is in one storey. The gabled bay on the right has a mullioned and transomed window; the other windows are sashes. The porch is in timber and is gabled.
Outbuilding	Speke Hall; 53.33648°N 2.87327°W		16th century (probable)	The outbuilding is a small rectangular structure standing to the east of the hall. The lower part is in stone, and the upper part is timber framed on the front and in brick on the sides. It is roofed in stone-slate, and has a central entrance.
Range of outbuildings	Speke Hall; 53.3363°N 2.8707°W		1885–88	These originated as a range of farm buildings for the Speke estate, and were converted in 2000–01 into a shop, café, and visitor centre. They are built in sandstone and brick with slate roofs, and form an E-shaped plan.
Gate piers	Speke Road; 53.34864°N 2.88052°W		c. 1940	These were the four gate piers to the original Liverpool Speke Airport. They were formerly at two entrances, and were moved here in 1998 by Herbert Tyson Smith. The piers are rectangular structures in limestone. Two of them are carved with a winged motif; the others are plain.

== See also ==
- Architecture of Liverpool

== References and notes ==
Notes

Citations

Sources

- Pollard, Richard; Pevsner, Nikolaus (2006), Lancashire: Liverpool and the South-West, The Buildings of England, New Haven and London: Yale University Press, ISBN 0-300-10910-5
