= St Mary's Church, Leyland =

Church in Lancashire, England

Coordinates: 53.692°N 2.7049°W

St Mary's Church
- St Mary's Catholic Church
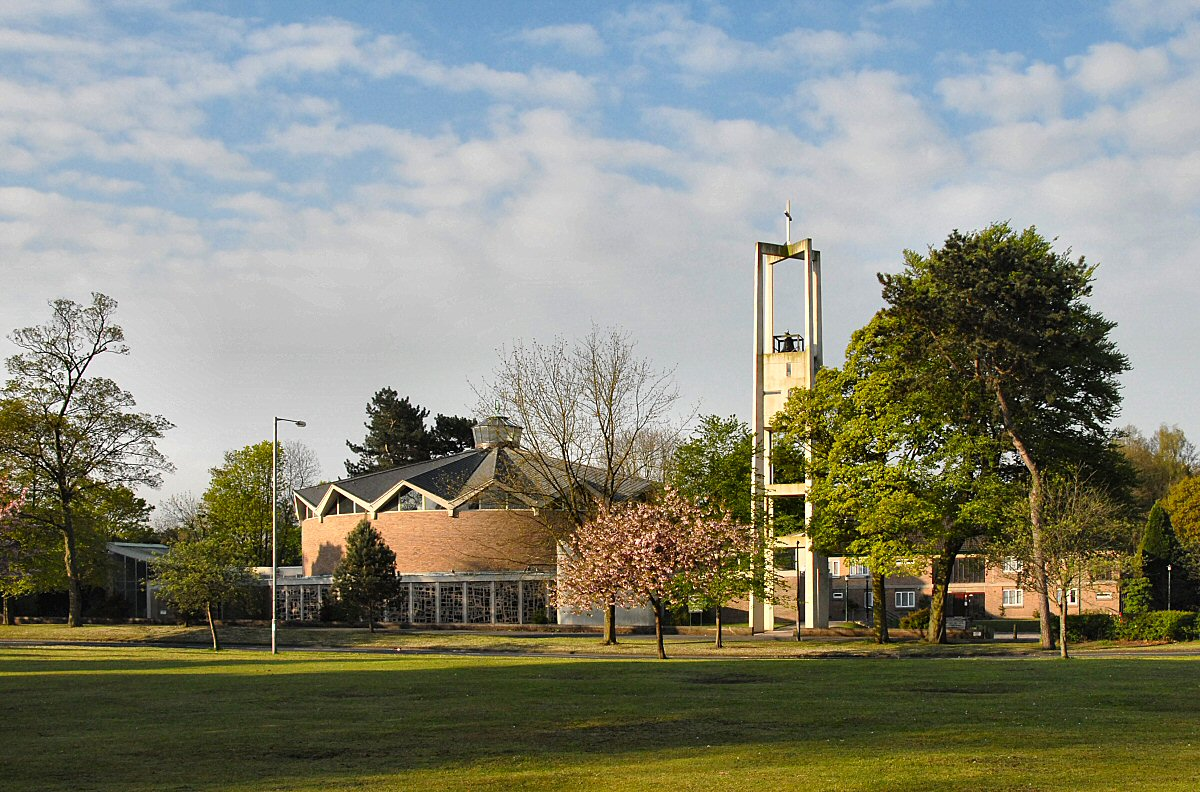
- St Mary's Church
- OS grid reference: SD535219
- Location: Leyland
- Country: England
- Denomination: Roman Catholic
- Website: LeylandStMarys.org.uk

History
- Status: Active
- Founder: Edmund Fitzsimmons OSB
- Dedication: Saint Mary

Architecture
- Functional status: Parish church
- Heritage designation: Grade II listed
- Designated: 25 September 1998
- Architect: Jerzy Faczynski
- Style: Modernist
- Groundbreaking: 1962
- Completed: 1964

Administration
- Province: Liverpool
- Archdiocese: Liverpool
- Deanery: Lancashire
- Parish: Leyland

St Mary's Church is a Catholic parish church in Leyland, Lancashire, UK. It was built from 1962 to 1964. The architect was Jerzy Faczynski, who designed the church in the Modernist style of architecture. According to Christopher Martin in his book A Glimpse of Heaven, "Art and architecture rarely come together in a late 20th-century church as successfully as they do here." It is located on Broadfield Drive in the town. It is a Grade II listed building.

== History ==
=== Origin ===
After the English Reformation, during the time of recusancy, and before the Roman Catholic Relief Act 1829, Catholics were recorded as living in South Ribble, Lancashire. From the 1530s to the late 1700s, the area comprising modern-day South Ribble and the area around it, was well known for being a place where numerous Catholics lived.

In the 19th century, Catholics in and around Leyland were served by Benedictine priests from Ampleforth Abbey. In 1845, the Benedictines came to Leyland. In 1854, the first St Mary's Church was built. It was located on Worden Lane. By 1900, the Catholic population had grown to around 500.

=== Construction ===
By 1945 and the end of Second World War, industry was experiencing a growth in and around Leyland. A new town was planned for this part of Lancashire. From 1952, the parish priest was Fr Edmund Fitzsimmons OSB. He saw the local population growing. By the early 1960s, the Catholic population in Leyland was 5,000. He decided that a new larger church was needed to accommodate the increasing Catholic congregation. He was influenced by the new churches being built on the European continent and travelled there to get ideas. He returned from Europe with a wooden model of what he wanted the church to look like.

In 1962, the foundation stone was blessed and laid by Cardinal John Heenan, Archbishop of Liverpool. The architect was Jerzy Faczyński. He worked for the architectural firm Weightman and Bullen and was a student of the Polish School of Architecture. Faczynski was an ex-serviceman who studied at the architectural school during the war, while it was based in Liverpool. In addition to the church, he also designed the church tower, which is detached from the church and is also a Grade II listed building. In April 1964, the church was completed and it was dedicated and consecrated by Archbishop George Beck.

== Design ==
The church features many parts and sculptures that were designed by notable artists from the time of its construction. Above the entrance to the church is a large depiction of the Last Judgement made in ceramic and designed by Adam Kossowski. He also made the rood above the altar showing Christ the King. The stations of the cross were designed by Arthur Dooley. There are numerous stained glass windows, including 36 abstract panels along the aisle designed by Patrick Reyntiens. The Blessed Sacrament chapel has a tapestry depicting the Holy Trinity, which was designed by the church's architect, Jerzy Faczynski.

== Parish ==
In April 2025, the Benedictines left the parish and it was handed over to the Archdiocese of Liverpool, who continue to serve it today. While the church has a parish of its own, it is also part of a family of parishes in the surrounding area, these are: St Mary Magdalen & St Teresa, Penwortham; St Oswald's, Longton; Our Lady Help of Christians, Tarleton and St Catherine Labouré, Farington. The church has two Sunday Masses, at 6:00pm on Saturday and at 10:00am on Sunday, with a 10:00am Mass from Monday to Thursday.

== See also ==
- St Mary's Catholic High School, Leyland
