= All Saints Church, Speke =

Coordinates: 53.3440°N 2.8579°W

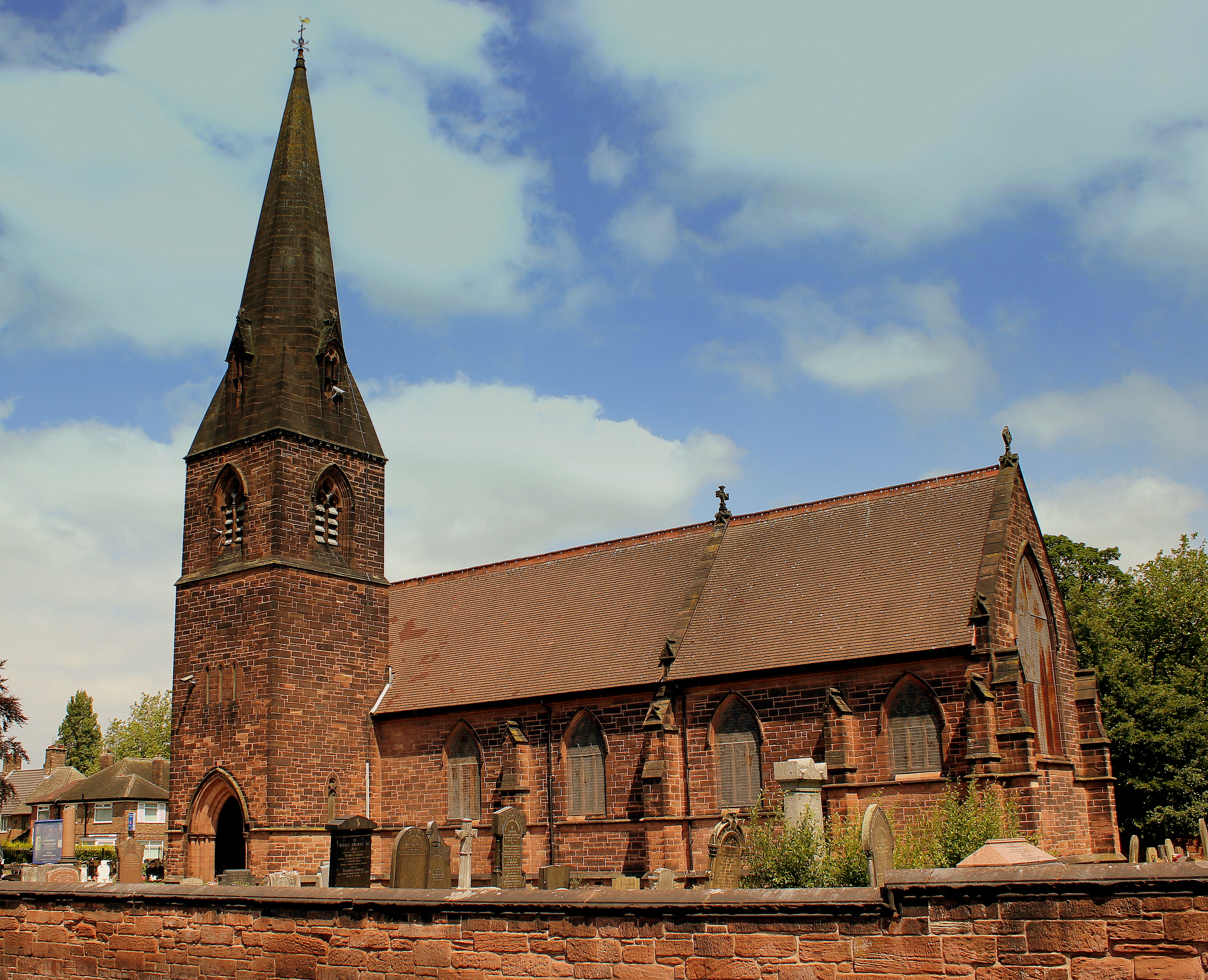

- Location in Merseyside
- OS grid reference: SJ 430 834
- Location: Speke, Liverpool, Merseyside
- Country: England
- Denomination: Anglican

History
- Consecrated: 21 June 1876

Architecture
- Groundbreaking: 1872
- Completed: 1875

Specifications
- Materials: Stone, tiled roofs

Administration
- Province: York
- Diocese: Liverpool
- Archdeaconry: Liverpool
- Deanery: Liverpool South Childwall

Clergy
- Rector: Revd Phil Saltmarsh

All Saints Church is in Speke, Liverpool, Merseyside, England, standing at the junction of Hale Road and Speke Church Road. It is an active Anglican parish church in the deanery of Liverpool South Childwall, the archdeaconry of Liverpool, and the diocese of Liverpool. Its benefice is united with that of St Aidan, Speke. The church is recorded in the National Heritage List for England as a designated Grade II listed building.

== History ==
The church was built between 1872 and 1875, and designed by John Loughborough Pearson. It was consecrated by the Bishop of Chester on 21 June 1876. The church was enlarged in the 1930s; this included a new vestry, offices, and the installation of electric lighting.

== Architecture ==
=== Exterior ===
All Saints is constructed in snecked red stone, with a tiled roof. Its architectural style includes Decorated details, including Geometric tracery in some of the windows. Its plan consists of a nave, a north aisle, a north transept, a chancel with a north vestry, and a southwest steeple. On the northwest side of the tower is a stair turret, and the entrance to the church is on the south side of the tower. Above the entrance are three lancet windows, and above them, the bell openings have two lights. The tower is surmounted by a broach spire with lucarnes. At the west end of the church, the nave has a four-light window, and the aisle window has two lights. The windows along the side of the nave have three lights, and those along the aisle have two lights. The east window has five lights; this window is flanked by gabled buttresses. In the transept is a three-light window.

=== Interior ===
Inside the church is a four-bay arcade carried on round columns. The chancel arch is carried on corbelled responds (half-columns). Between the chancel and the organ loft is a pair of arches with a tympanum containing a quatrefoil. The stained glass in the windows was made by Clayton and Bell. The original pipe organ had two manuals, and was made by Gray and Davidson. It was replaced in the 1930s. There is a ring of three bells, which were cast in 1874 by John Taylor & Co, but these are no longer ringable.

== Appraisal ==
The church was designated as a listed building on 14 March 1975. It is listed at Grade II, which is the lowest of the three grades, and includes buildings that are "of special interest, warranting every effort to preserve them.". The church is discussed by Pollard and Pevsner in the Buildings of England series. They are of the opinion that it is "not on a par" with Pearson's Church of St. Agnes elsewhere in Liverpool, and state that it is "simple, reasonable and serious, but devoid of Pearson's great enthusiasm".

== See also ==
- Grade II listed buildings in Liverpool-L24
- List of new ecclesiastical buildings by J. L. Pearson
