= St Francis de Sales, Hampton Hill and Upper Teddington =

Church in Middlesex, England

Coordinates: 51.4313°N 0.3522°W

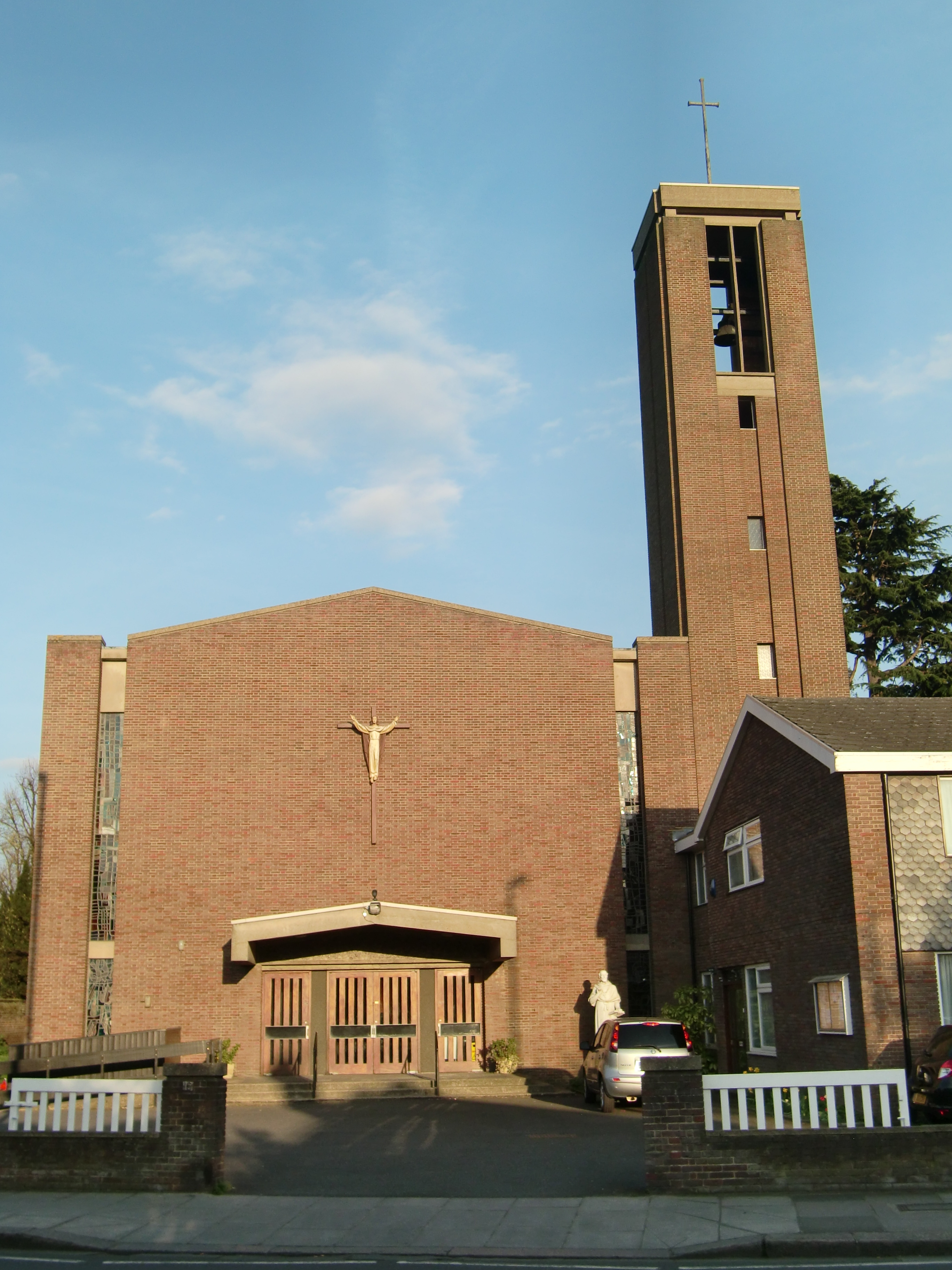
- View from Wellington Road, April 2011
- St Francis de Sales, Hampton Hill and Upper Teddington
- Location: 16 Wellington Road, Hampton Hill, Middlesex TW12 1JR
- Country: England
- Denomination: Roman Catholic
- Website: stfrancisdesales.co.uk

Architecture
- Architect(s): Burles, Newton & Partners
- Years built: 1966

Administration
- Division: Upper Thames
- Diocese: Roman Catholic Archdiocese of Westminster

Clergy
- Priest: Fr Wojciech Stachyra SChr

The Church of St Francis de Sales is a Roman Catholic church in Hampton Hill, in the London Borough of Richmond upon Thames. It is the parish church for the parish (Catholic Church) of Hampton Hill and Upper Teddington in the Upper Thames Deanery of the Diocese of Westminster.

The parish was formed in 1920 and the original church completed in 1928. The current church, constructed in 1966, was designed by Burles, Newton & Partners, who also completed the nave at St Aidan's Roman Catholic Church, Coulsdon in the London Borough of Croydon. The stained glass in the church's nave was designed by Jerzy Faczynski. It was consecrated on 18 December 1976.
