= Jerzy Faczyński =

Polish soldier, architect and artist

- Born: Jerzy Faczyński; 25 April 1917; Yenakiieve
- Died: 22 April 1994 (aged 76); Liverpool, UK
- Education: Academy of Fine Arts; Warsaw Polytechnic; Polish School of Architecture Liverpool
- Known for: Drawings, architecture, churches, stained glass
- Military career
- Allegiance: Poland
- Branch: Polish Air Force
- Service years: 1939-1945

Jerzy Faczyński (1917 to 1994) was a Polish soldier, architect and artist.

== Biography ==
On 25 April 1917, he was born in Yenakiieve, in what was then the Russian Empire, in present-day Ukraine, to a Polish family. His mother, Marian, came from Bydgoszcz, Poland. She was also an artist and teacher. He graduated from the Academy of Fine Arts in Kraków. In the late 1930s, he designed polychromes for a church in Kraków, held two exhibitions of his work in 1937 and 1938 and graduated from Warsaw Polytechnic in architecture.

During the Second World War, he served in the Polish Air Force. He fought on the Hungarian front, where he was captured, interred, escaped and rejoined the Polish Air Force. After the fall of France, he moved to the UK as a refugee. He continued in the Polish Air Force, fighting in Britain and France. In 1942, while serving as a sergeant in the Air Force, he joined the then-established Polish School of Architecture in Liverpool. The school was associated with the University of Liverpool School of Architecture, and opened by Władysław Sikorski, Prime Minister of Poland in November 1942. During his time in the war, he continued to sketch drawings, and these were published in 1945 in his book Studies in Polish Architecture. In 1946, the book was reprinted. The book contains a foreword by Lionel Bailey Budden and an introduction by Zbigniew Dmochowski, describing the life and work of Faczyński.

After the Second World War, he lectured in drawing in at the Polish School of Architecture from 1946 to 1952, worked at the Hammersmith School of Art and from 1952 to 1955, and went on to work for the architectural firm of Weightman and Bullen (established 1912). During his lifetime Faczynski designed more than fifty Catholic churches. According to Christopher Martin in his book A Glimpse of Heaven, Faczyński was one the Polish School of Architecture's "most successful students".

== Works ==
As well as designing many churches while working for Weightman and Bullen, he also designed stained glass windows for many other churches. His works include: St Ambrose's Church, Speke; St Mary's Church, Leyland; St Joseph's Church, Llangefni; and stained glass windows in St Anselm's Church, Southall; St Francis de Sales, Hampton Hill; St Gregory the Great Church, Swarcliffe; St Philip and St James Church, Bedford; and St Andrew and St Cuthbert Church in Kirkcudbright.

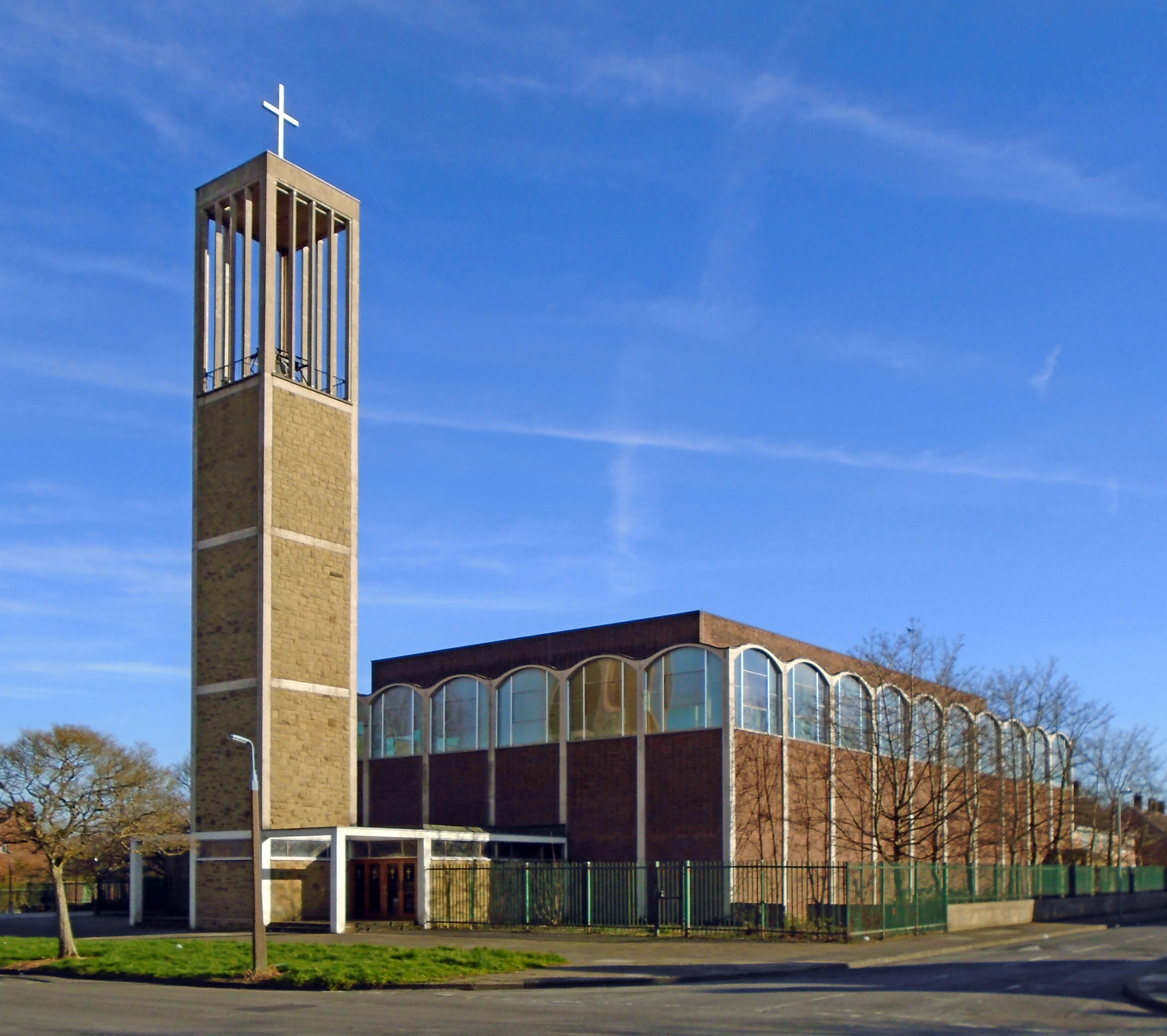
St Ambrose's Church, Speke

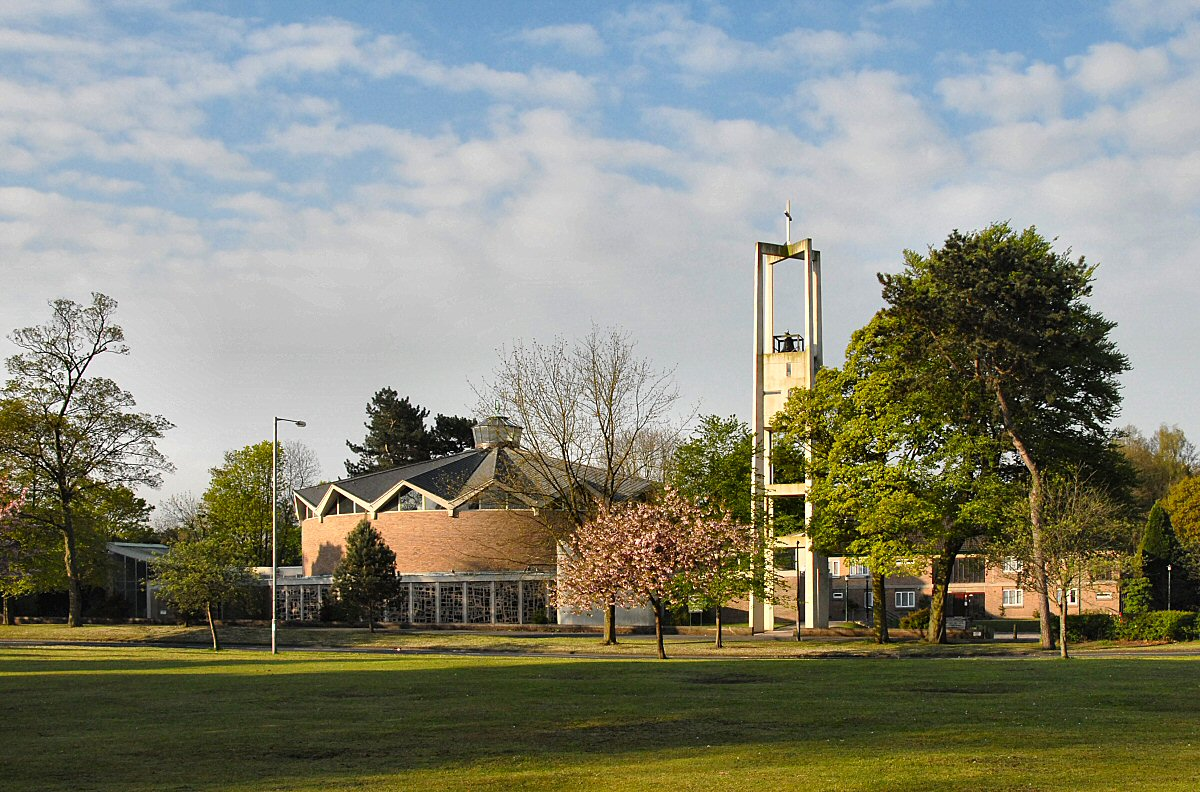
St Mary's Church, Leyland

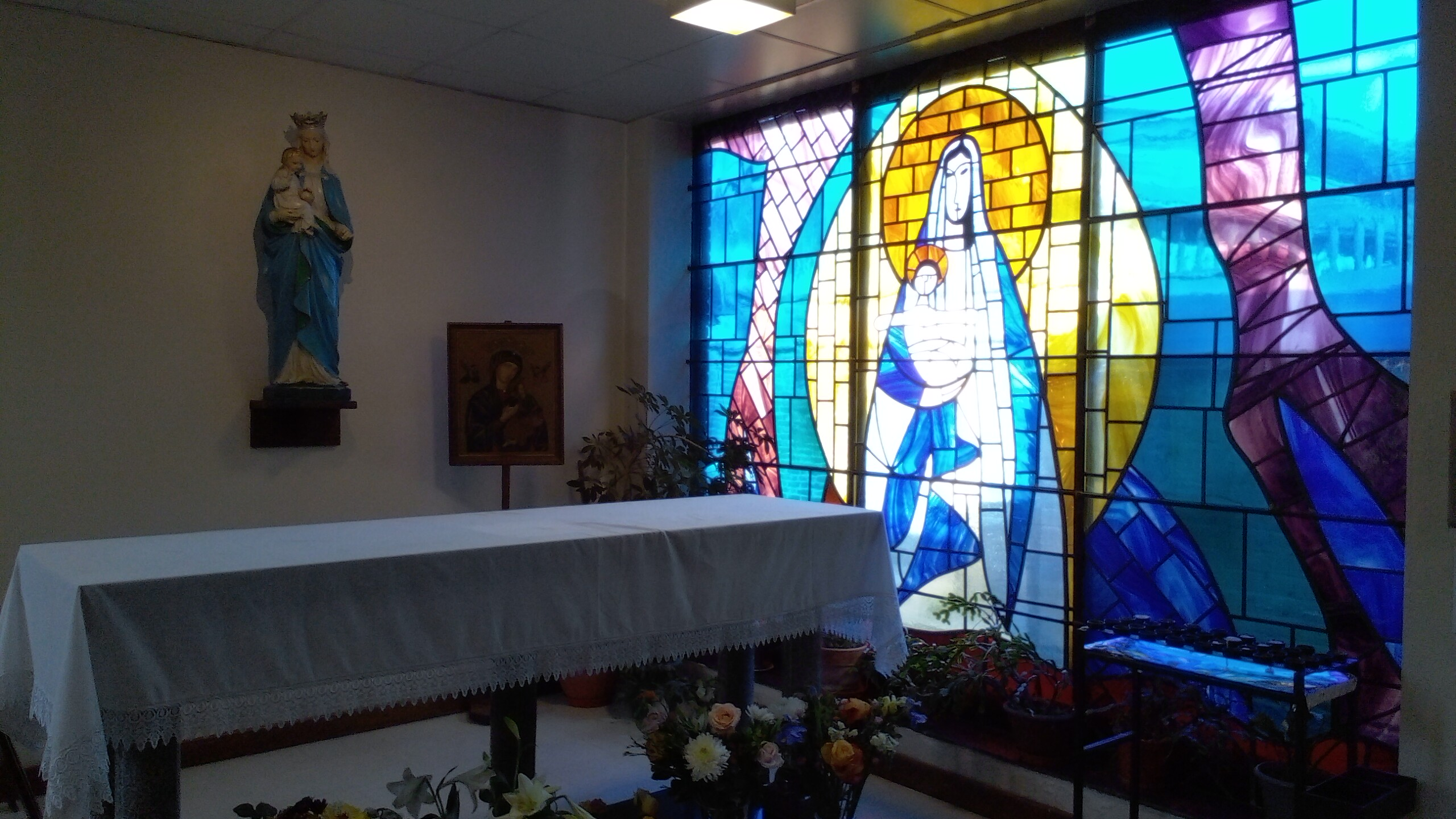
Lady chapel window in St Anselm's Church, Southall

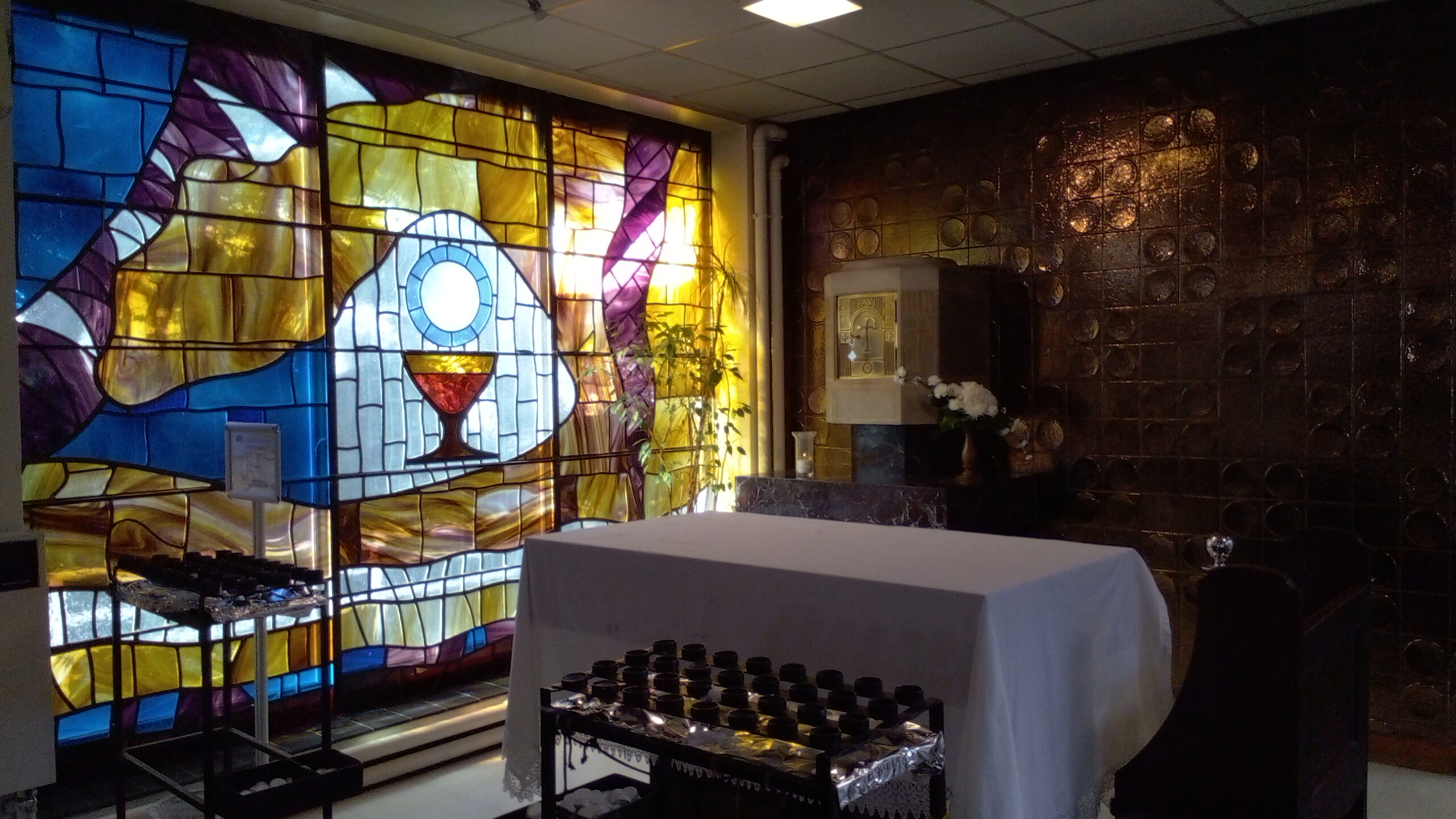
Blessed Sacrament chapel window in St Anselm's Church, Southall

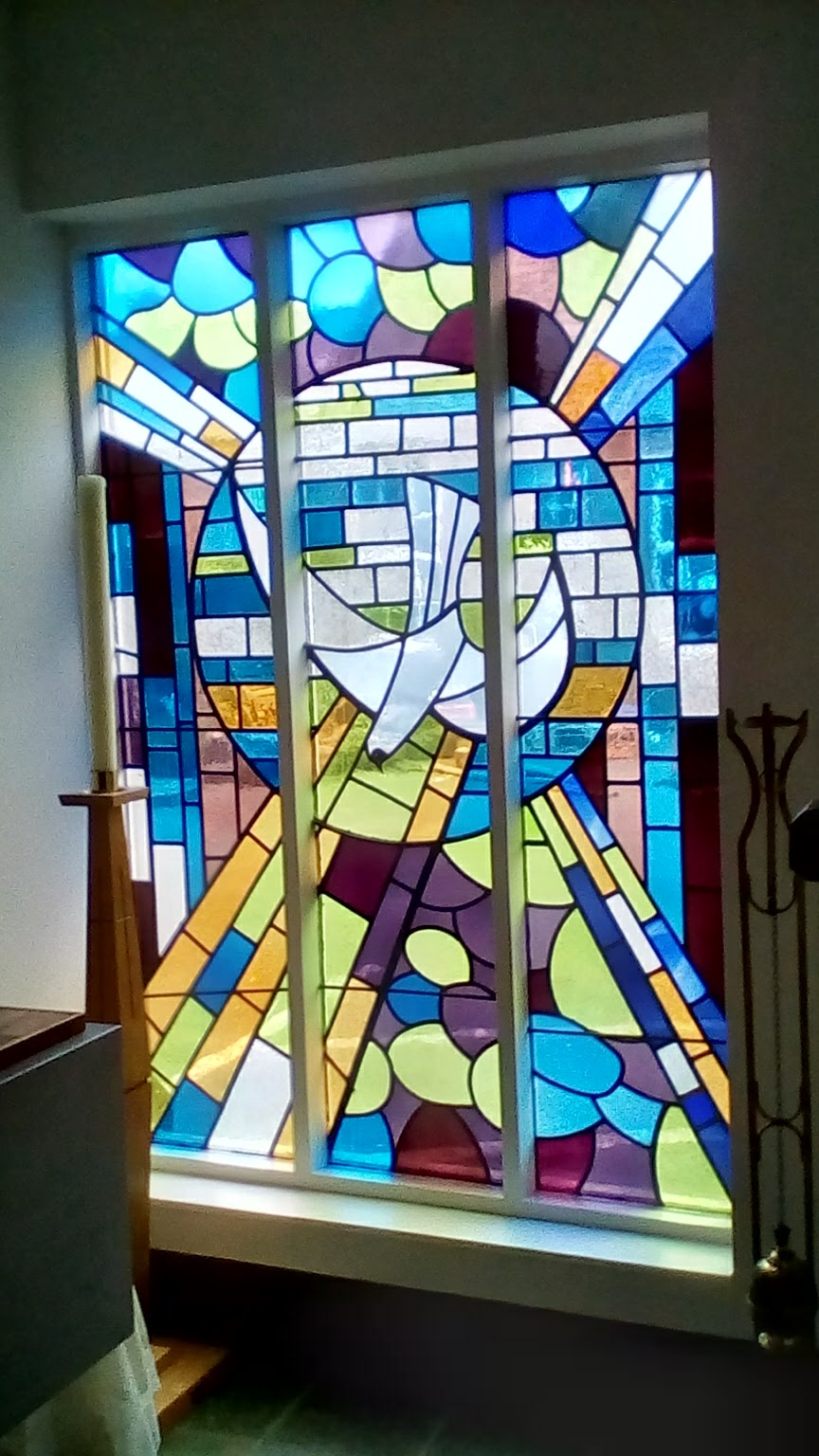
Baptistry window in St Andrew and St Cuthbert Church in Kirkcudbright

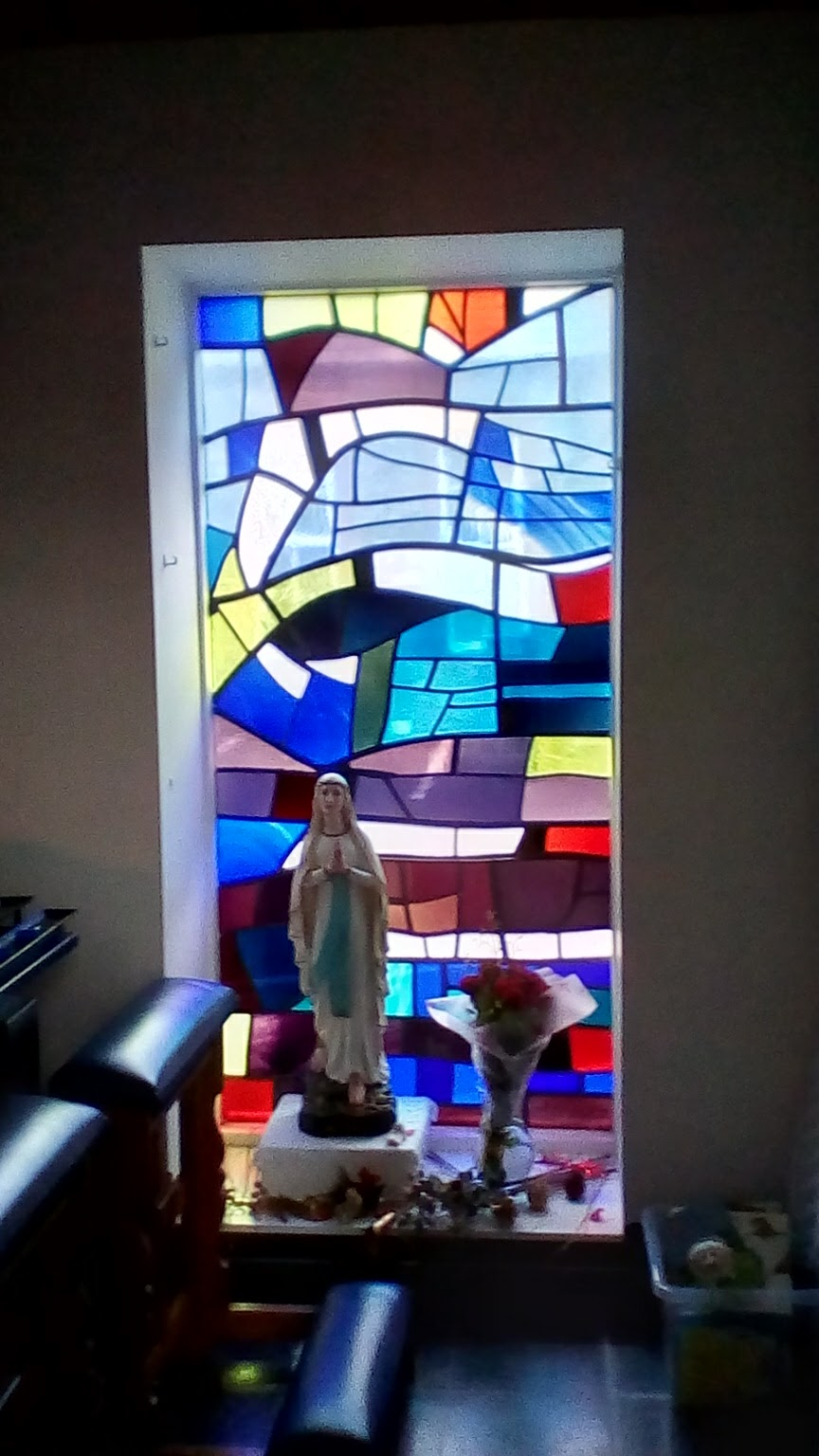
Lady chapel window in St Andrew and St Cuthbert Church in Kirkcudbright

== See also ==
- Liturgical Movement
- Patrick Reyntiens

== Bibliography ==
- Jerzy Faczyński, Studies in Polish Architecture, trans. Peter Jordan (Liverpool: University Press of Liverpool, 1945). Reprinted 1946.
- Lidia Gerc, "Studies of Polish Architecture by Jerzy Faczyński (Review)," Historia Sztuki 2012, Notebook 1-2 (16–17). https://doi.org/10.12775/AE.2012.022.
