= Jeremy Allerton =

English cricketer

Personal information
- Full name: Jeremy William Orde Allerton
- Born: 2 February 1944 (age 82); Windsor, Berkshire
- Batting: Left-handed
- Bowling: Right-arm medium

Domestic team information
- Years: Team
- 1967: Oxford University

Career statistics
Competition	First-class
Matches	15
Runs scored	605
Batting average	24.20
100s/50s	0/3
Top score	67
Catches/stumpings	2/–
- Source: CricketArchive, 6 August 2008

Jeremy William Orde Allerton (born 2 February 1944) is an English former first-class cricketer who played for Oxford University Cricket Club. All of his first-class games were for Oxford University. One of these was a Varsity match when Oxford played against Cambridge University Cricket Club.

He is also a squash Blue and former captain of Oxford University Squash Racquets Club. He is an alumnus of Stowe School.
