= Allerton =

Allerton may refer to:

== Places ==
=== United Kingdom ===
- Allerton, Liverpool
  - Allerton Cemetery
  - Allerton railway station
  - West Allerton railway station
  - Allerton (Liverpool ward)
- Allerton, West Yorkshire, a suburb of Bradford, England
- Allerton Bywater, a village in West Yorkshire
- Allerton Mauleverer, a parish between Harrogate and York in England
  - Allerton Castle
- Chapel Allerton, part of the city of Leeds, England
- Chapel Allerton, Somerset, a village in southwest England
- Moor Allerton, an area of Leeds, England
- Northallerton, a town in North Yorkshire, England, formerly Allerton
  - Allerton (wapentake), an ancient subdivision of the North Riding of Yorkshire

=== United States ===
- Allerton, Illinois, a village located in Champaign County
- Allerton, Iowa, a city located in Wayne County
- Allerton, a neighborhood in Hull, Massachusetts
- Allerton Garden in Hawaii, named after Robert and John Gregg Allerton
- Allerton, The Bronx, a neighborhood in New York City, New York
- Robert Allerton Park, park, nature center, and conference center on an estate donated by Robert and John Gregg Allerton

== Other ==
- Allerton Hotel, Chicago, Illinois
- Allerton (surname)
- Baron Allerton, a title in the peerage of the United Kingdom
