= Speke =

Suburb of Liverpool, in Merseyside, England

Coordinates: 53.3409°N 2.8410°W

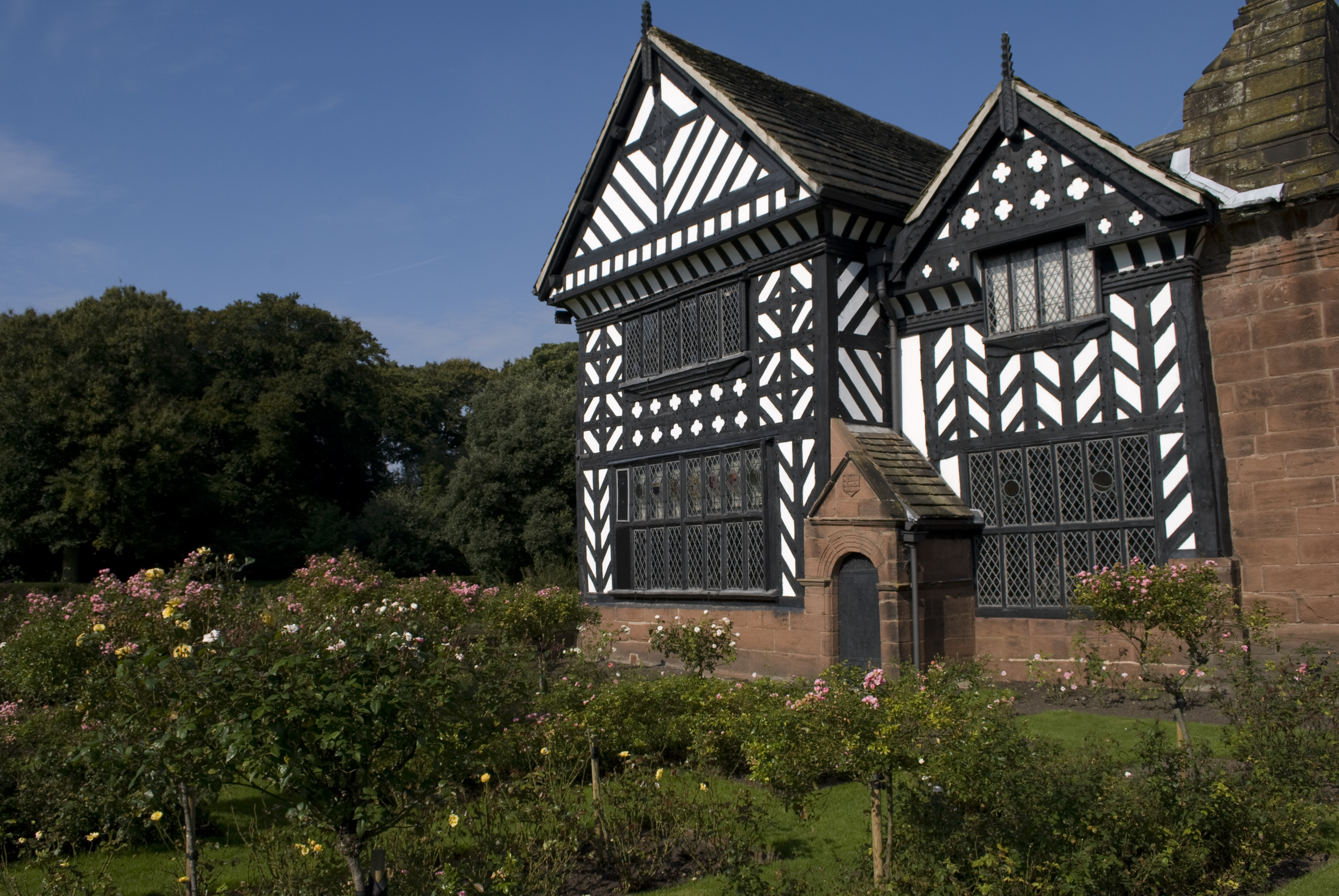
- Speke Hall

- Location within the United Kingdom
- OS grid reference: SJ441835
- Metropolitan borough: Liverpool
- Metropolitan county: Merseyside
- Country: England
- Sovereign state: United Kingdom
- Post town: LIVERPOOL
- Postcode district: L24
- Dialling code: 0151
- UK Parliament: Liverpool Garston

Speke (/ˈspiːk/) is a suburb of Liverpool, in Merseyside, England. It lies 8 miles (13 km) south-east of the city centre and near to the widest part of the river Mersey. It is bordered by the suburbs of Garston and Hunts Cross, and the rural area of Oglet to its south; it is located near to Halewood, Hale and Widnes.

== History ==
The name derives from the Old English Spec, meaning 'brushwood' or from Middle English Spek(e), meaning 'woodpecker'. It was known as Spec in the Domesday Book, which gave Speke Hall as one of the properties held by Uctred; today, the hall is a Tudor wood-framed house and is open to the public.

In the mid 14th century, the manors of Speke, Whiston, Skelmersdale, and Parr were held by William Dacre, 2nd Baron Dacre.

Speke was formerly a township in the parish of Childwall; in 1866, Speke became a separate civil parish and the parish was abolished and merged with Liverpool on 1 April 1932. In 1931, the parish had a population of 384.

Until the 1930s development by Sir Lancelot Keay, Speke was a small village with a population of 400; by the end of the 1950s, more than 25,000 people were living in the area. The local All Saints Church was built by the last resident owner of Speke Hall, Miss Adelaide Watt.

From 1795 until 1921, the Speke estate had belonged to the Watt family; when the family died out, the estate was placed in trust. It was bought by the Liverpool Corporation in 1928 for £200,000; the corporation's intention was to build a complete self-contained satellite town, at a time when the garden city movement was underway. The parish of Speke became part of the county borough of Liverpool in 1932, having previously belonged to the Whiston Rural District.

Constructed between 1930 and 1933, Speke Airport was the second busiest in the UK by the start of World War II. Retention of control by the Ministry of Civil Aviation in London after the war meant that it had lost its leading position in the UK by the 1950s. The industrial rise of Speke continued until the mid-1970s, when an equally rapid decline ensued over the next 20 years, particularly during the recessions of the early 1980s and early 1990s. The closure of the Bryant and May match factory in December 1994 was a noted example of these problems, as was the closure of the Triumph car plant more than a decade before. The area has however retained a cluster of pharmaceutical facilities, with companies operating there including Elanco, MedImmune and Novartis.

When the 2000 Index of Multiple Deprivation was published, Speke was revealed to be the second most deprived of all 8,414 wards in England and Wales. Only Benchill, in Manchester, had a higher level of poverty.

== Community ==
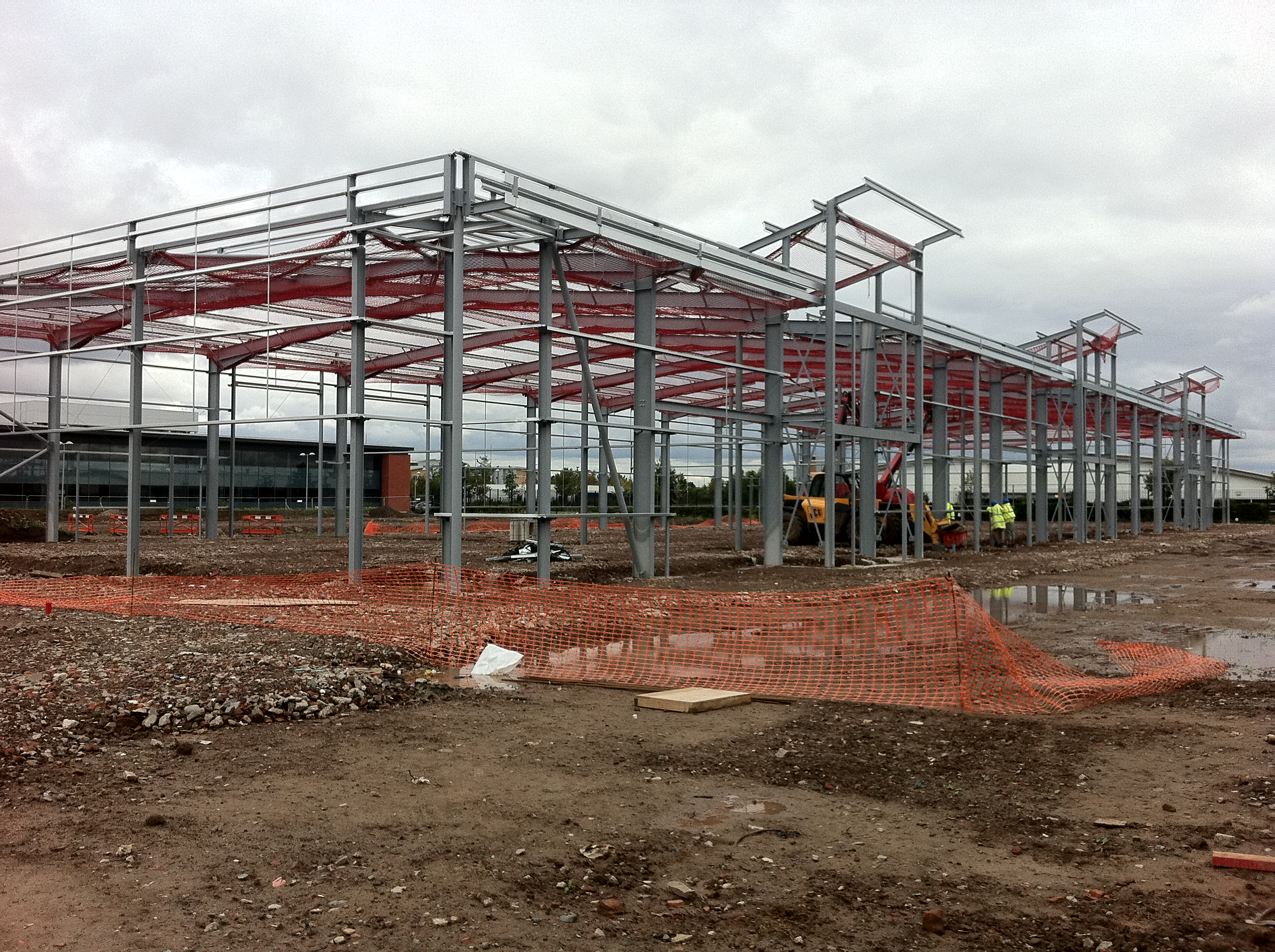
Estuary Commerce Park under construction in June 2012

The area is known for Speke Hall, a Tudor wood-framed house now owned by the National Trust and is open to the public. It is also notable as the location of Liverpool John Lennon Airport, known until 2001 as Liverpool Speke Airport. From the mid-1990s, the redevelopment of the original airport site, enabled by the construction of the new airport complex and runway, had left land available for the construction of a business park. The completion of the A5001 road consolidated the rise of the airport and improved communications in the area. (Note: The Speke Liverpool local history website shows a lot of the developments that changed Speke the village into Speke the estate with photographs and documents from the 1870s onwards.)

The New Mersey Shopping Park was redeveloped in 1999 from an older retail site; it houses many large retail and textile outlets, as well as mainstream restaurants. The New Mersey Retail Estate is situated between Speke and Garston, directly opposite to the Old Liverpool Airport main terminal building, which is now a hotel complex.

The area also features the Mersey Wave, opened officially on 15 December 2003, a 200 ft-long (61 m) and 100 ft (30 m) high illuminated sculpture comprising two sets of six aluminium fins. The sculpture, designed by Peter Fink, was removed for repairs within weeks of opening, a problem causing its fins to move dangerously in high winds having been discovered. It was rebuilt in June 2005 and the structure, 30 ft (9.1 m) taller than the Angel of the North at Gateshead, is visible from as far as Winter Hill in Horwich.

In 2011, planning was submitted and subsequently granted for Estuary Banks, a £6 million business park scheme developed by Capital & Centric Plc and Barnfield Construction. Constructed started on 80,000 sq ft (7,400 m^{2}) of speculative construction in November 2011. The latest phase (120,000 sq ft) has been completed with 80,000 sold to Business First in June 2012.

Recent developments in Speke have seen a multi-million pound Morrisons supermarket, situated directly next to the A561 Speke Boulevard, which is located only metres away from the Mersey Wave. Planning was granted in May 2012 for Speke Business Park on Goodlass Road; it comprises 45,000 sq ft (4,200 m^{2}) of business units.

== Transport ==
=== Roads ===
The main road network in Speke is the A561 Speke Boulevard, which links the area to Garston, Aigburth, Dingle and Toxteth in the west, and Widnes and Runcorn in the east. Close by is the A5300 Knowsley Expressway which provides links to the A562 to Widnes and Runcorn, the M62 motorway and eventually becomes the M57 at Tarbock Interchange.

The Speke estate was generally built around two notable roads, Western Avenue and Eastern Avenue, which linked to a former shopping parade in Central Way in more recent years this was replaced by an extensive shopping and retail development off Eastern Avenue and Speke Boulevard.

Speke is also approximately 8 miles (13 km) away from the western terminus of the M62, at Rocket roundabout in Broadgreen.

=== Buses ===
Speke has a good bus network, which uses the Aigburth Road/Park Road and Allerton Road/Penny Lane corridors in south Liverpool; routes are mostly operated by Arriva North West.

Routes 80/80A, 82/82A, 86A and 500 link Speke to the city centre and these services provide links to Dingle, Toxteth, Aigburth, Mossley Hill, Allerton, Grassendale and Garston with the 82A continuing further afield to Widnes and Runcorn. Other notable bus services include the 81/81A to Bootle and the 89 to St Helens.

=== Railway ===
Hunts Cross railway station, on the Merseyrail network, is the nearest National Rail station to Speke, about 1 mile (1.6 km) away. It is also served by Northern Trains and East Midlands Railway services between Liverpool Lime Street, Warrington Central, Manchester Piccadilly and beyond.

Liverpool South Parkway is in nearby Garston, which facilitates additional services by Avanti West Coast and London Northwestern Railway to the West Midlands and London Euston via the West Coast Main Line. Bus routes 80A and 86A provide a regular connection to the airport.

=== Air ===
Liverpool John Lennon Airport is located at the base of the Speke estate, near to the river Mersey; it has undergone expansion in recent years. The airport's strategy is to cater largely for 'low cost' operators such as easyJet, Ryanair and Jet2, which operate the majority of routes; services are also provided by Loganair, Aer Lingus and Wizz Air. The airport serves various destinations in mainland Europe, with some to North Africa, the Mediterranean and the Middle East.

== Sport ==
Speke South Liverpool, a local amateur football side, was founded at the Austin Rawlinson Sports Centre. However, late 2005 saw the club relocate a short distance away to Mossley Hill.

The leading amateur football club in the area is now St Christophers FC, which is located at Central Way playing fields.

== Notable residents ==
- George Harrison – musician
- Paul McCartney – musician
- Les Dennis – comedian and television presenter
- Mo Marley – football player and manager
- Leonard Rossiter – actor
- Alan Rudkin – boxer
- Peter Withe – football player and manager
- Robert Maudsley – murderer.

== See also ==
- St Ambrose's Church, Speke
