= St Ambrose's Church, Speke =

Coordinates: 53.3402°N 2.8269°W

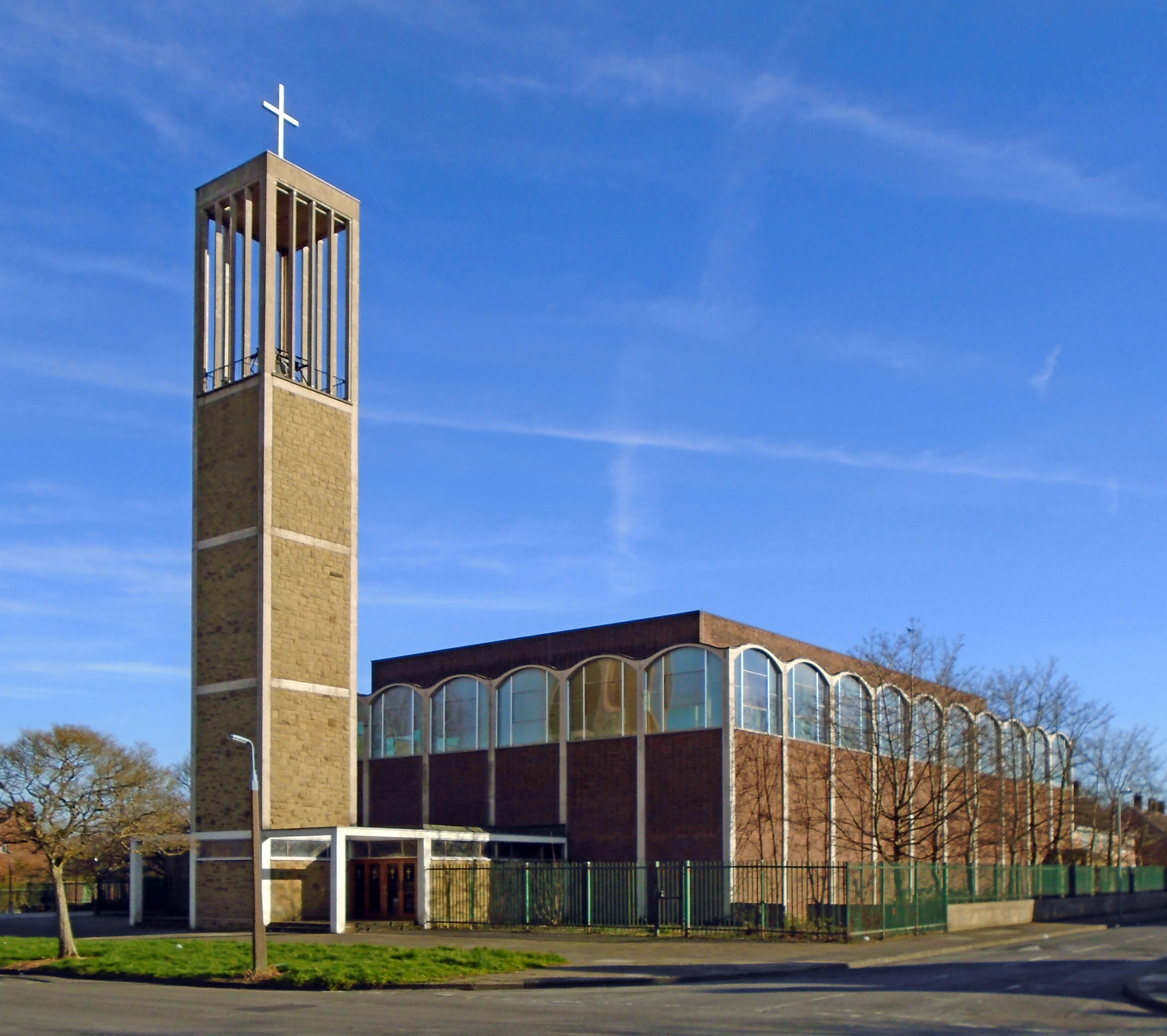
- St Ambrose's Church, Speke

- Location in Merseyside
- OS grid reference: SJ 45042 82907
- Location: Heathgate Avenue, Speke, Liverpool, Merseyside
- Country: England
- Denomination: Roman Catholic

History
- Status: Parish church

Architecture
- Functional status: Active
- Heritage designation: Grade II
- Designated: 16 November 2007
- Architect: Alfred Bullen
- Architectural type: Church
- Style: Modernist
- Groundbreaking: 1959
- Completed: 1961

Specifications
- Materials: Reinforced concrete and brick

Administration
- Diocese: Archdiocese of Liverpool

Clergy
- Priest: Revd Edward Cain

St Ambrose's Church is a Roman Catholic parish church in Heathgate Avenue, Speke, Liverpool, Merseyside, England. It is an active parish church in the Archdiocese of Liverpool and the Pastoral Area of Woolton and Halewood. The church is recorded in the National Heritage List for England as a designated Grade II listed building.

== History ==
The church was built between 1959 and 1961. It was designed by Alfred Bullen of Weightman and Bullen, with assistance from Jerzy Faczyński. It was built to serve the housing estate of Speke, which had been started in the 1930s, and which was expanded in the 1950s.

== Architecture ==
=== Exterior ===
The church is built on a reinforced concrete frame, with cladding in brick. It has a rectangular plan with a free-standing sanctuary. To the north is a campanile 84 feet (26 m) high, joined to the body of the church by a low entrance range. To the south of the church is a Lady Chapel, also joined to the rest of the church by a low range. The body of the church is surrounded by tapering concrete pilasters. Between the pilasters, the lower part is in brick, and the upper part is glazed. The windows have curved heads, forming an arcade around the building. The campanile is in brick, and divided by concrete bans into four stages. The top stage contains a bell, and is open between mullions. Surmounting the campanile is an illuminated cross.

=== Interior ===
Inside the church are tunnel vaults on three sides with a segmental arcade carried on square columns; this forms an ambulatory. The roof is flat and trabeated, with pyramidal acoustic panels. The floor is in terrazzo, with the sanctuary area raised and in marble. A stone altar slab stands on three steps, and is flanked by a font and a pulpit. There are pews on three sides of the sanctuary. The organ is in a raised position above the entrance. Around the church are Stations of the Cross by Adam Kossowski. The stained glass is by Gounil and Philip Brown. Wall paintings behind the altar date from the 1990s. The pipe organ has two manuals, and was made by Rushworth and Dreaper.

== Appraisal ==
The church was designated as a listed building on 16 November 2007. It is listed at Grade II, which is the lowest of the three grades, and includes buildings that "are nationally important and of special interest". The listing description states that the building is "on an unusually broad and ambitious scale that is relatively little altered". Pollard and Pevsner in the Buildings of England series are of the opinion that the church is the best building on the Speke estate, "though it is unshakeably redolent of a sports hall and boiler chimney". The church claims to be the first Roman Catholic church in England to be completed to a rectangular plan with a free-standing altar.

== See also ==
- Grade II listed buildings in Liverpool-L24
