= Augustinian Province of England and Scotland =

Administrative division of Roman Catholic order

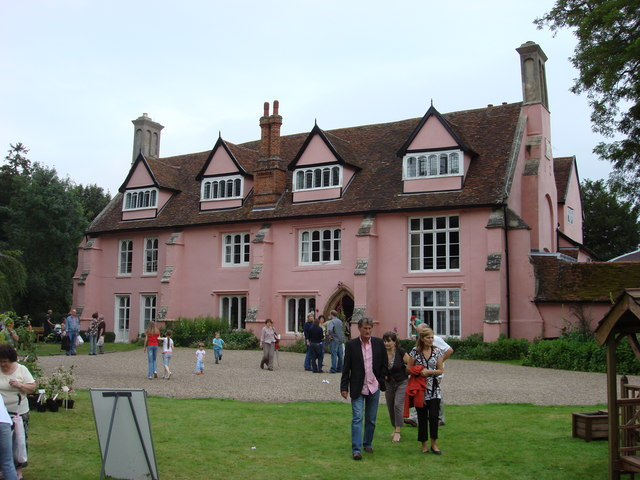
Clare Priory

The Augustinian Province of England and Scotland is an administrative unit for the Order of Saint Augustine that covers England and Scotland. It comprises all the Augustinian works that take place in England and Scotland.

== The Province of England and Scotland ==
The Order of Saint Augustine is a Roman Catholic religious order. It was created in the 13th century and based upon the Rule of St. Augustine of Hippo. There are Augustinians in the majority of countries around the world, including Europe, Oceania and the Americas.

=== History ===
==== England ====
The Augustinians, known from medieval times in England as the Austin Friars, came to England in 1248, when Richard de Clare, Earl of Gloucester and Hertford offered Augustinian friars in Normandy, land on which to establish their first foundation in England. Clare Priory thus became the first Augustinian foundation in the English-speaking world. Other houses were opened in quick succession. In 1253 they settled in London where "Austin Friars" was to become the most important house of the Order in England.

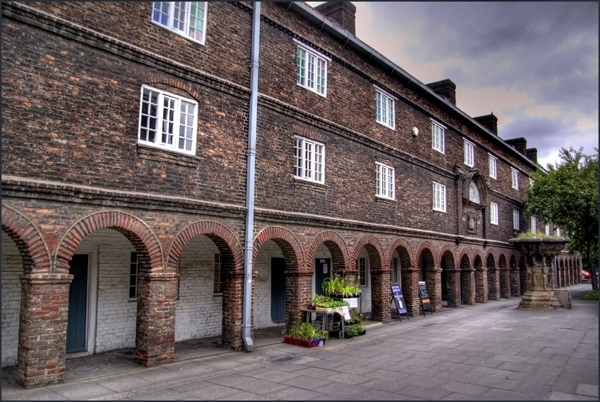
Front of Holy Jesus Hospital

The priory at Clare reflected the contemplative nature of the friars. The foundation in London reflected the missionary zeal of the new mendicant order. The next development, the setting up of houses in the university cities of Oxford (1266) and Cambridge (1289), represented the Order’s desire to further the study of theology and to maintain high standards of scholarship. Initially the houses in England had been part of the French Augustinian Province. By the year 1265 when the first provincial chapter was celebrated at Clare, England had become a separate province with its own prior provincial. Like all provinces, the English priories came under the authority of the Prior General. In 1291, Holy Jesus Hospital was founded at Newcastle upon Tyne. The priory served as a lodgings house because it was on one of the main roads to the north. (The building is used as the central office of the National Trust; The site holds remains of a 14th century church wall and window from the priory.

In 1300, the Austin Friars had twenty-two houses in Britain and a five priories in Ireland, which were then occupied principally by English Augustinians. Further expansion in England raised this number to thirty-four before the end of the fourteenth century. At the moment of its greatest expansion in 1350 the province would have numbered more than 700 friars and yet the fifteenth century saw it decline until at the moment of suppression in 1538 there were only 317 members. Fathers John Stone, Martin de Condres, and Paul of Saint William (all of Droitwich) were martyred at Canterbury in December 1538 for their adherence to papal supremacy despite Henry VIII's claims to the contrary.

Among the members of the Province there were noteworthy writers: poet Osbern Bokenham, Biblical commentator and historian John Capgrave, Biblical translator Myles Coverdale, and William Flete, spiritual adviser to St Catherine of Siena.

==== Scotland ====
In 1260 there was an Augustinian house in Berwick-upon-Tweed, then in Scotland. Robert the Bruce contributed £20 towards the building of a new Augustinian church.

==== Wales ====
Around 1344, Ralph Stafford, 1st Earl of Stafford founded a house for the Austin friars at Stafford; this was late followed by a house at Newport, Wales, where they also had a hospital.

==== Restoration ====
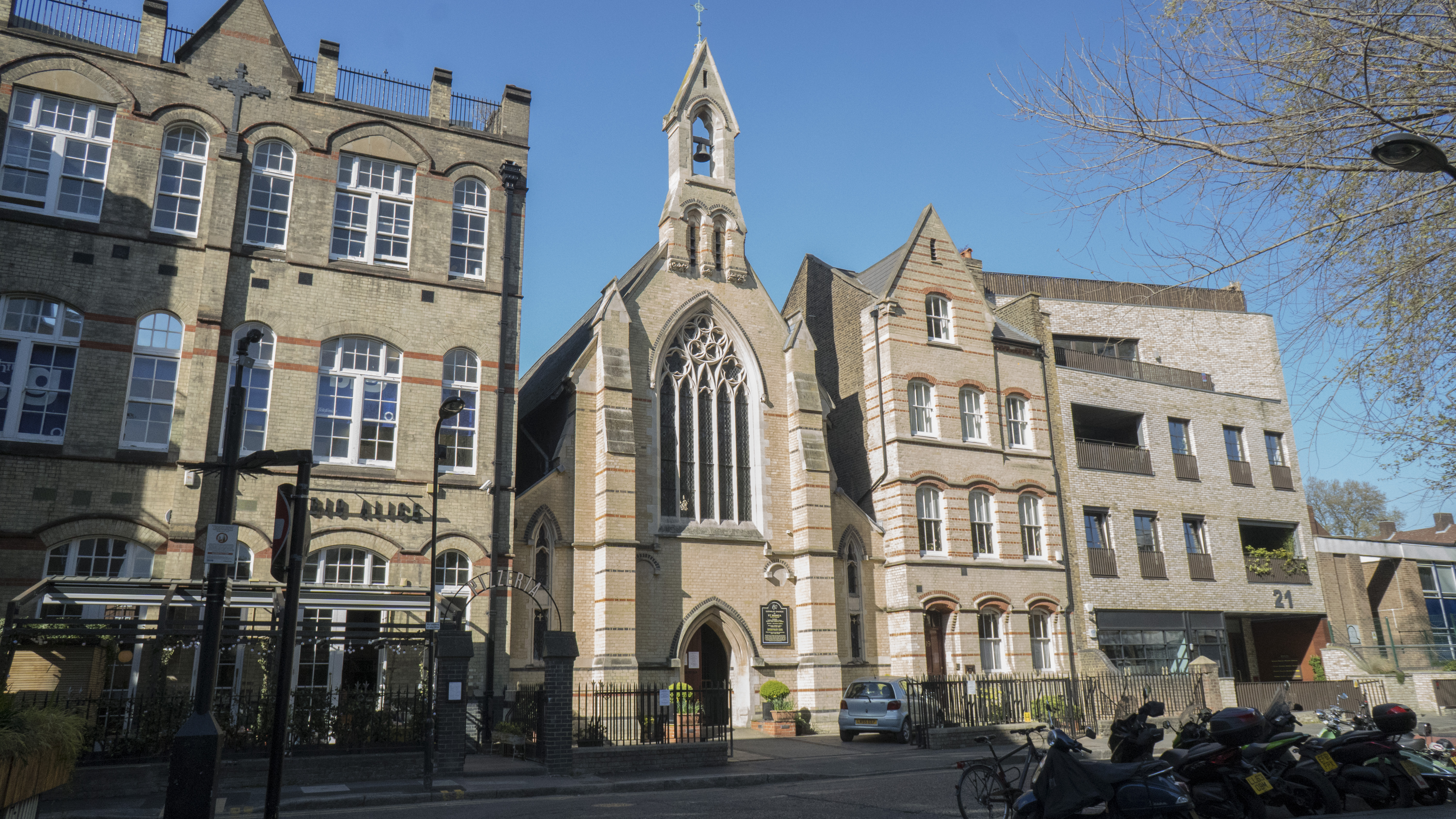
Church of St Monica and Priory Of The Augustinian Friars

There were some attempts to restore or to continue Augustinian life by individuals who came from Spain, Rome and Ireland. Eventually, thanks to the Irish Province, it was possible to make a new start in the second half of the nineteenth century when St Monica’s, Hoxton Square, the first permanent foundation since the Reformation, was opened in 1864, followed by Our Lady of Good Counsel, Hythe (1891) and St Augustine's Church, Hammersmith (1903). The consolidation of these communities continued and was followed by significant expansion in the second half of the century. The Order took on the responsibility of the parish of SS Peter and Paul, Dundee, in 1948. The return to Scotland heralded the renaissance of the Anglo-Scottish province. Further development took place in 1951: a new school, Austin Friars, was established in Carlisle, in the north of England. Austin Friars began as a boarding school for boys (11 yrs – 18yrs), with some day pupils. In the twenty-first century, it is co-educational, educates only day pupils.

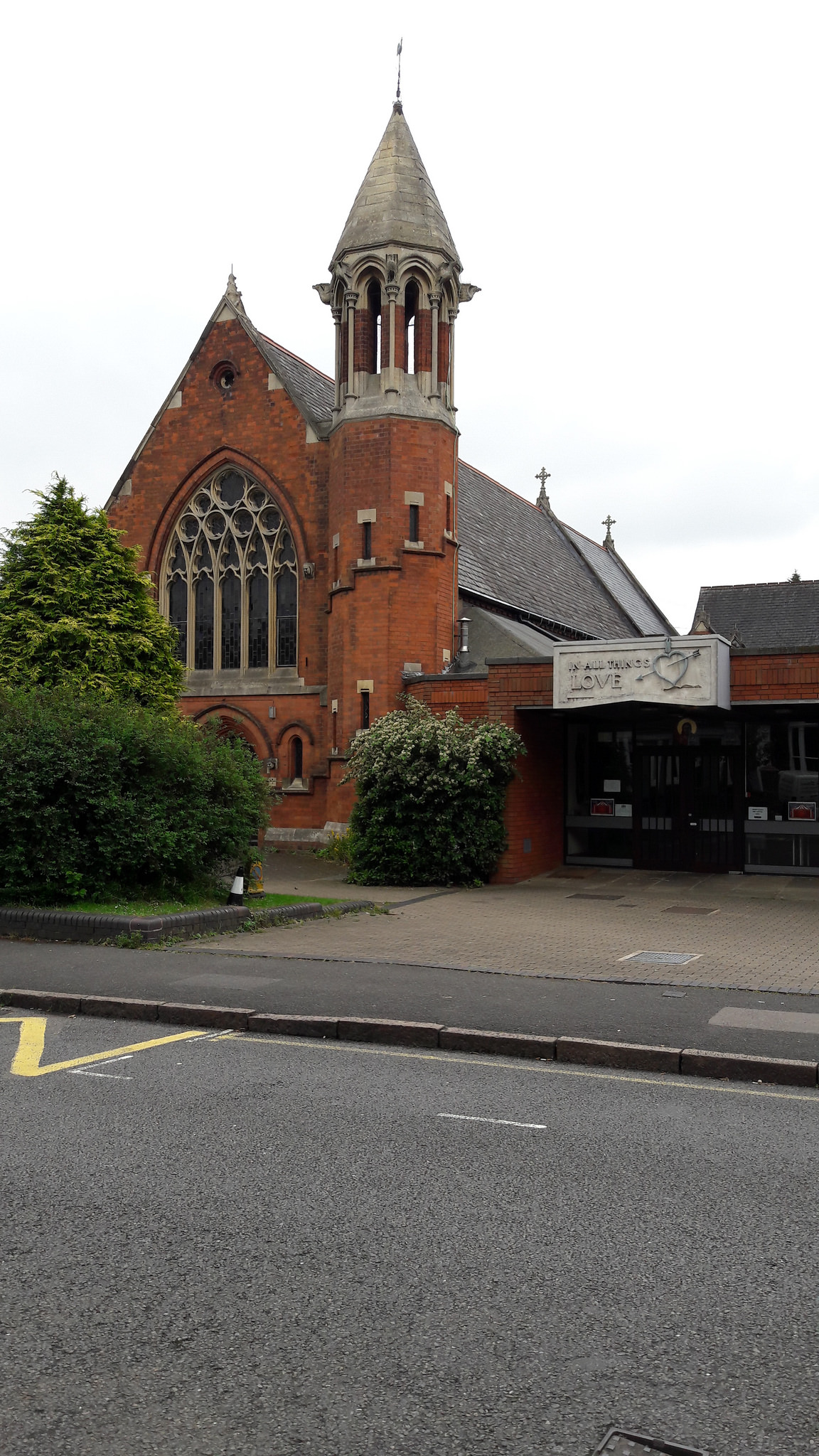
St Mary's Church, Harborne

Clare Priory, the first-ever Augustinian foundation in Britain, was bought back and became the novitiate for the vice-province. The first chapter of the Order to be held in England since 1532 took place at Clare in 1970. The 1970s saw further, considerable growth, with the establishment of parishes in Woodvale, Southport, and Bishop’s Court Preparatory School nearby, together with St Mary’s, Great Yarmouth. In 1973, the friars took over the parish of St Mary's Church, Harborne, Birmingham from the Passionists.

With such growth, supported by generous assistance from the mother Province in Ireland and encouraged by several vocations from England and Scotland, the vice-province was granted full Province status in September 1977. Fr Bernard O’Connor became Provincial of the new Anglo-Scottish Province. Saint John Stone, martyred under Henry VIII, was named patron of the re-established Province.

=== Present Day ===
As of 2024, there are 4 Augustinian communities around the UK; St. Mary's, Harborne, Clare Priory in Suffolk, St Augustine's Church, Hammersmith and St Monica's Church, Hoxton. There are around 20 Augustinian Friars in total serving in the UK involved in a variety of ministries, including prison and University chaplaincy. Clare Priory, serves as a parish and retreat centre and also houses a shrine dedicated to Our Lady, Mother of Good Counsel.

There is also a community of Augustinian Canonesses at the Boarbank Hall in Cumbria.

== See also ==
- Order of Saint Augustine
