= Monastery of the Holy Saviour =

Historic monastery in Lecceto, Tuscany, Italy

Coordinates: 43°19′13″N 11°14′56″E

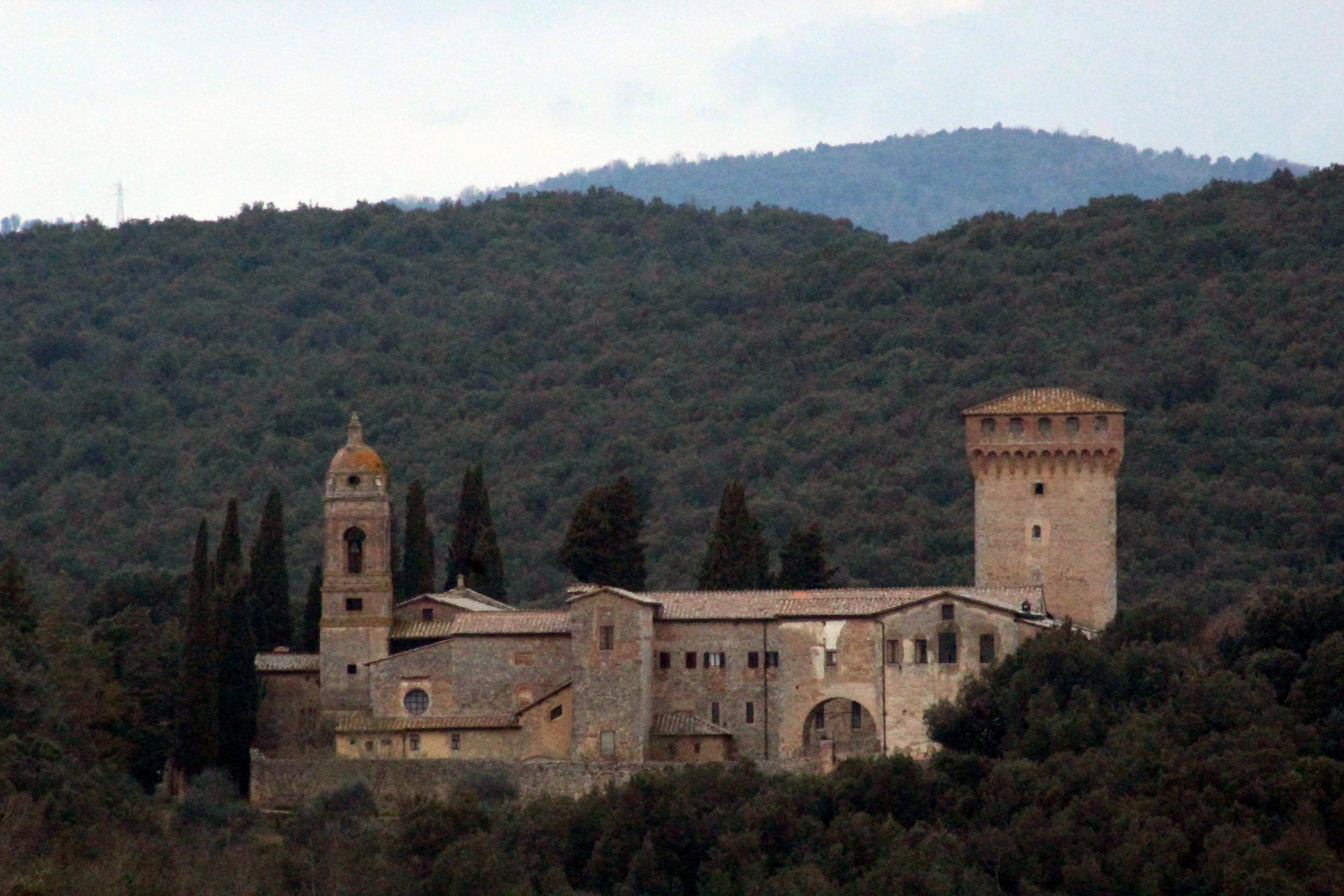
Monastery of the Holy Saviour

The Monastery of the Holy Saviour at Lecceto in Tuscany, was the principal House of the order of the Hermit Friars of Saint Augustine (not to be confused with the Augustinian Canons Regular) in 1256, when Pope Alexander IV constituted the Augustinian order internationally. It was dedicated to Jesus as Saviour.

== History ==
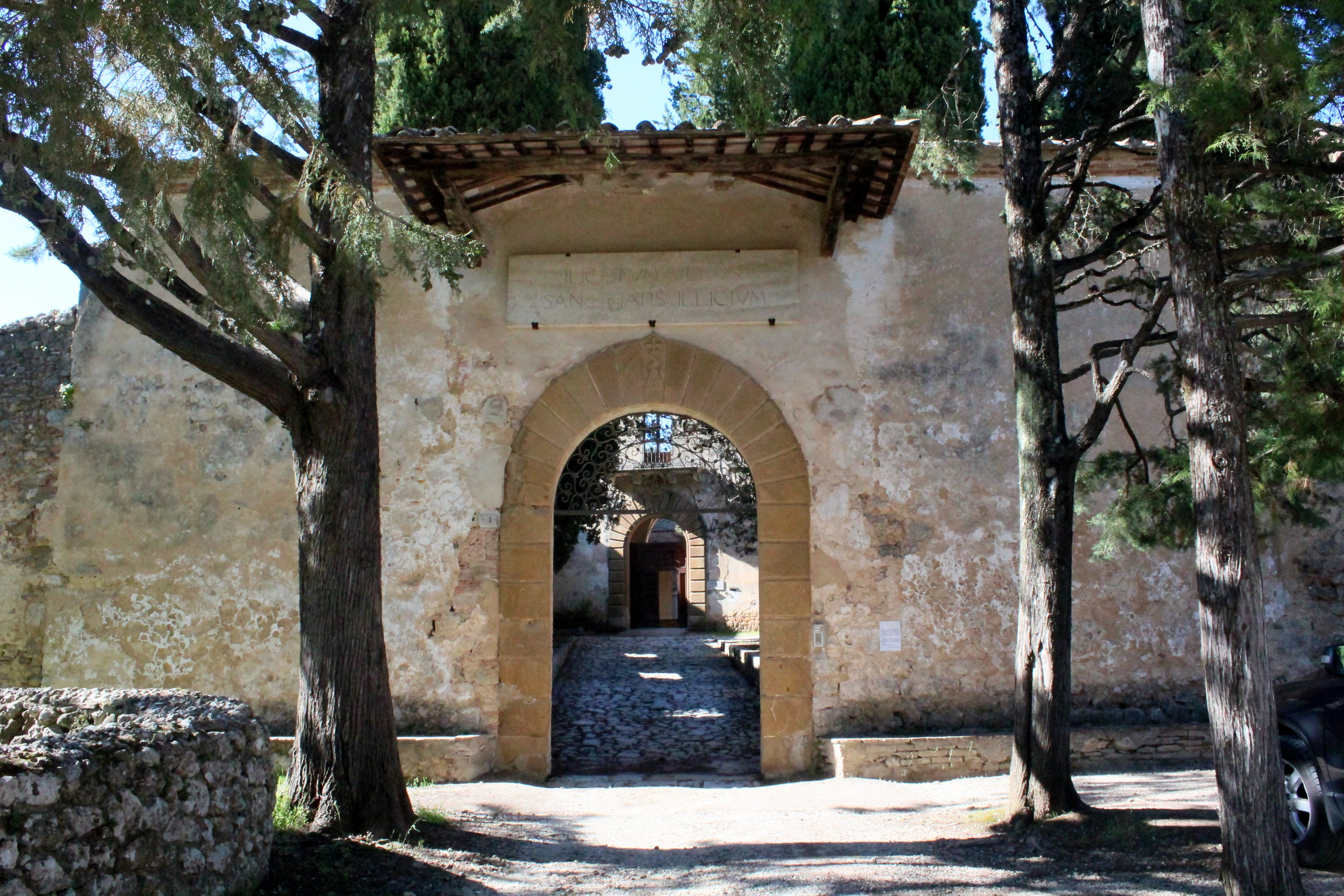
Entrance

The earliest-known reference to any sort of hermitage at Lecceto is dated 1223. It is about a mile from S. Leonardo al Lago, which lies to the northwest.

The hermitage was first known as San Salvatore di Foltignano. Later it was called San Salvatore di Selva di Lago, a reference to the surrounding thick forest of holm oaks. A church was built in 1227. In 1228, Bishop Bonfilius of Siena gave the various groups of hermits in the area the Rule of Saint Augustine. In 1243 the Tuscan hermits petitioned Pope Innocent IV to unite them all as one group, which he did with the papal bull Incumbit Nobis.

On 4 May 1256 Pope Alexander IV issued a papal bull "Licet ecclesiae catholicae" uniting five monastic congregations into the Tuscan community of Lecceto. The other four were the houses of St. William, of Brother John Bono, of Favale and of Brettine. From this act of union, the modern Order expanded rapidly, and it is from this act of union that Tuscany is regarded as the homeland of the modern Augustinian Friars, and Lecceto is its principal monastic house.

Probably the most famous member of the Lecceto community was William Flete, an English friar. In 1359, when Flete was about to attain his Master of theology degree at Cambridge University, he had a change of heart and chose to leave England and go to Lecceto to intensify his experience of contemplation. A little beyond the monastery are caves to which some of the friars would retreat for solitude. One such was William Flete, a friar from England. He would spend his days in study and contemplation in one of these caves, and return to the monastery at night to sleep. He was regarded by his contemporaries as a master of the spiritual life. A number of friars opted to withdraw themselves from the monastery to small hermitages or caves in the surrounding forest.

In 1385 Lecceto was designated as the first Augustinian house of strict observance. Lecceto became a centre of reform for the Augustinians, and developed methods of encouraging a more faithful practise of the Augustinian Rule, and the Constitutions of the Order. From Lecceto, other like-minded groups developed over the centuries.

Pope Pius II visited Lecceto in 1459 on his way to the Diet at Mantua. Giles of Viterbo spent four years at Lecceto, before responsibilities as vicar-general of the order drew him away.

Between 1317 and 1345 the church was enlarged and a cloister built. The tower was begun in 1405. A new refectory and dormitory was built in 1484. In 1554 during war between Florence and Siena near Lecceto, troops of Florence sacked the hermitage. In the seventeenth century, the monastery owned eleven farms, but the land was poor; it also owned some property in the city of Siena.

During the turmoil of the Napoleonic era, the monastery was suppressed and the sixteen Augustinians resident were forced out. The building was abandoned.

== Present day ==
By 1968 of the modern era, the monastery had declined, and the roof had fallen in. In that year, the Dominican bishop of Siena decided that he wanted to revitalise Lecceto Augustinian spirituality at Siena. He began a project to restore it, and to invite the Augustinian contemplatives to transfer their community there. Augustinian nuns arrived back in 1972.

The re-established community of Augustinians there have revived the Augustinian tradition of contemplation. The monastery welcomes overnight guests, who are also welcome to join the nuns at the Divine Office.

== Sources and external links ==
- Order of St Augustine, International Homepage
- Catholic Encyclopaedia – Hermits of St. Augustine
- Augustinian Abbey of St. Thomas at Brno
- Bl. Anthony Patrizzi and the Blessed of Lecceto (Augustinians of the Midwest)
