= St Monica's Church, Hoxton =

St Monica's Church
- St Monica's Priory Church
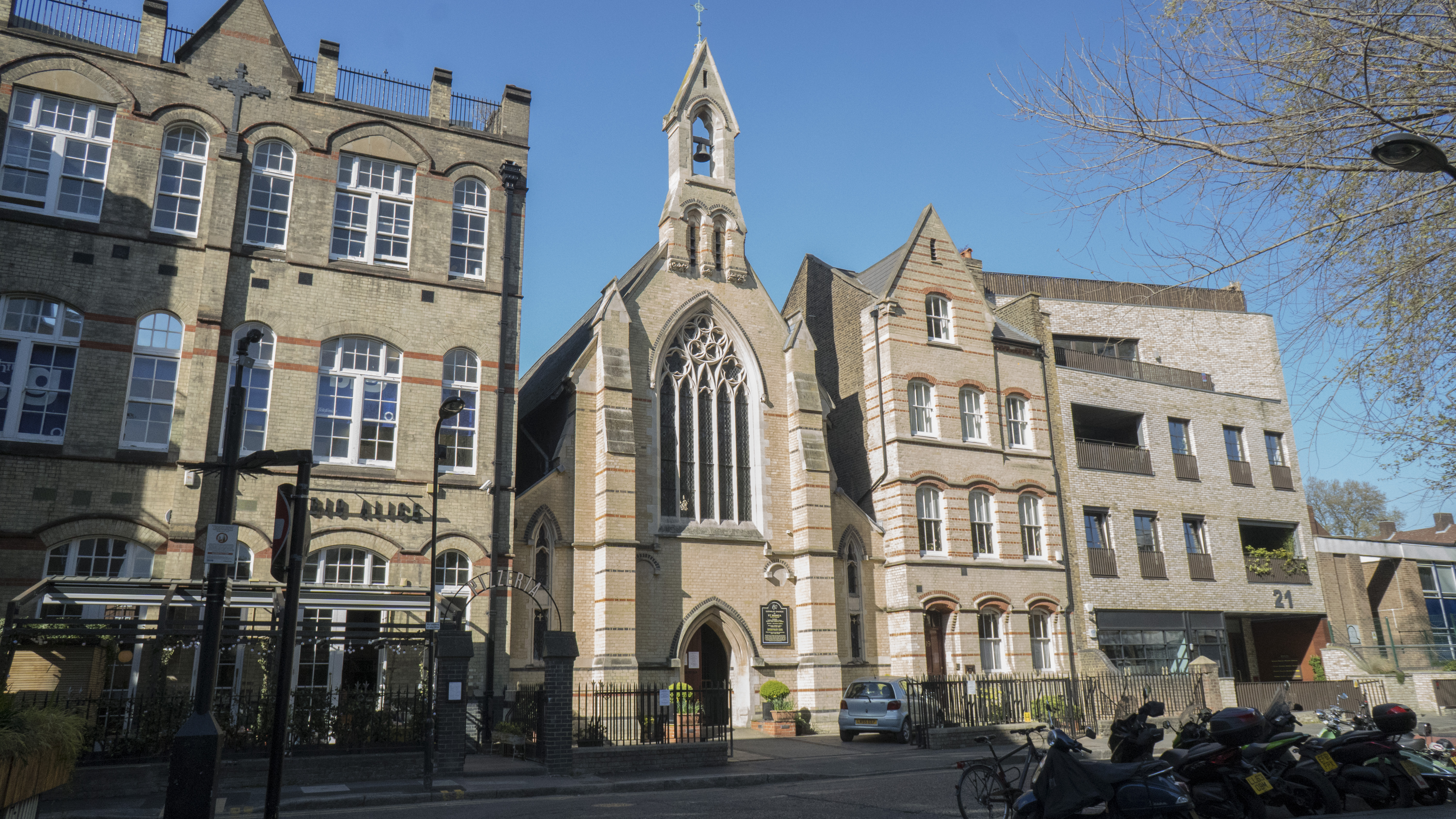
- St Monica's Church
- 51.5284°N 0.0815°W
- Location: Hoxton
- Country: England
- Denomination: Roman Catholic
- Religious institute: Order of St Augustine
- Website: StMonicasChurchHoxton.org

History
- Dedication: Saint Monica

Architecture
- Functional status: Active
- Heritage designation: Grade II listed
- Designated: 13 July 1994
- Architect: E. W. Pugin
- Groundbreaking: 20 September 1864
- Completed: 4 May 1866

Administration
- Archdiocese: Westminster
- Deanery: Hackney

St Monica's Church is a Roman Catholic parish church in Hoxton, London. It was founded by the Augustinian Friars, built in 1866 and designed by E. W. Pugin. It is located on Hoxton Square. It is a Grade II listed building.

== History ==
=== Construction ===
In August 1864, Cardinal Nicholas Wiseman invited the Order of Saint Augustine to start in a mission for the local Catholic community. 18 Hoxton Square was bought by Charles Walker for £1609 as a site for the building of a church. On 20 September 1864, the foundation stone of the church was laid by the Vicar General of the Archdiocese of Westminster, Edward Hearn. The church was designed by E. W. Pugin and built by Mr Oxborn of Clapton. In late March 1865, a concert was held in the sanctuary and part of the nave of the incomplete church. On 4 May 1865 the church was opened by the Bishop of Southwark Thomas Grant. At the opening the sermon was done by Henry Edward Manning. After its opening, the church was extended, and a priory was built next door for the Augustinians. On 4 May 1866, the feast of St Monica, the completed church was opened.

=== Developments ===
In 1875, a reredos by Franz Mayer of Munich was installed. In 1880, a lady chapel was added to the church, it was designed by John Young, the son of the architect John Young. From 1903, the Augustinian friars started going out to Hammersmith to serve the Catholic community there, eventually building St Augustine's Church in 1916. In 1907, the school next to St Monica's Church was demolished and replaced with a new one that was opened on 4 July 1908 by Archbishop of Westminster Francis Bourne.

== Parish ==
The church has five Sunday Masses at 6.30pm on Saturday and 9am, 11am & 6.30pm on Sunday. There are Masses 9:30am on weekdays and 11am on Saturday.

== Interior ==
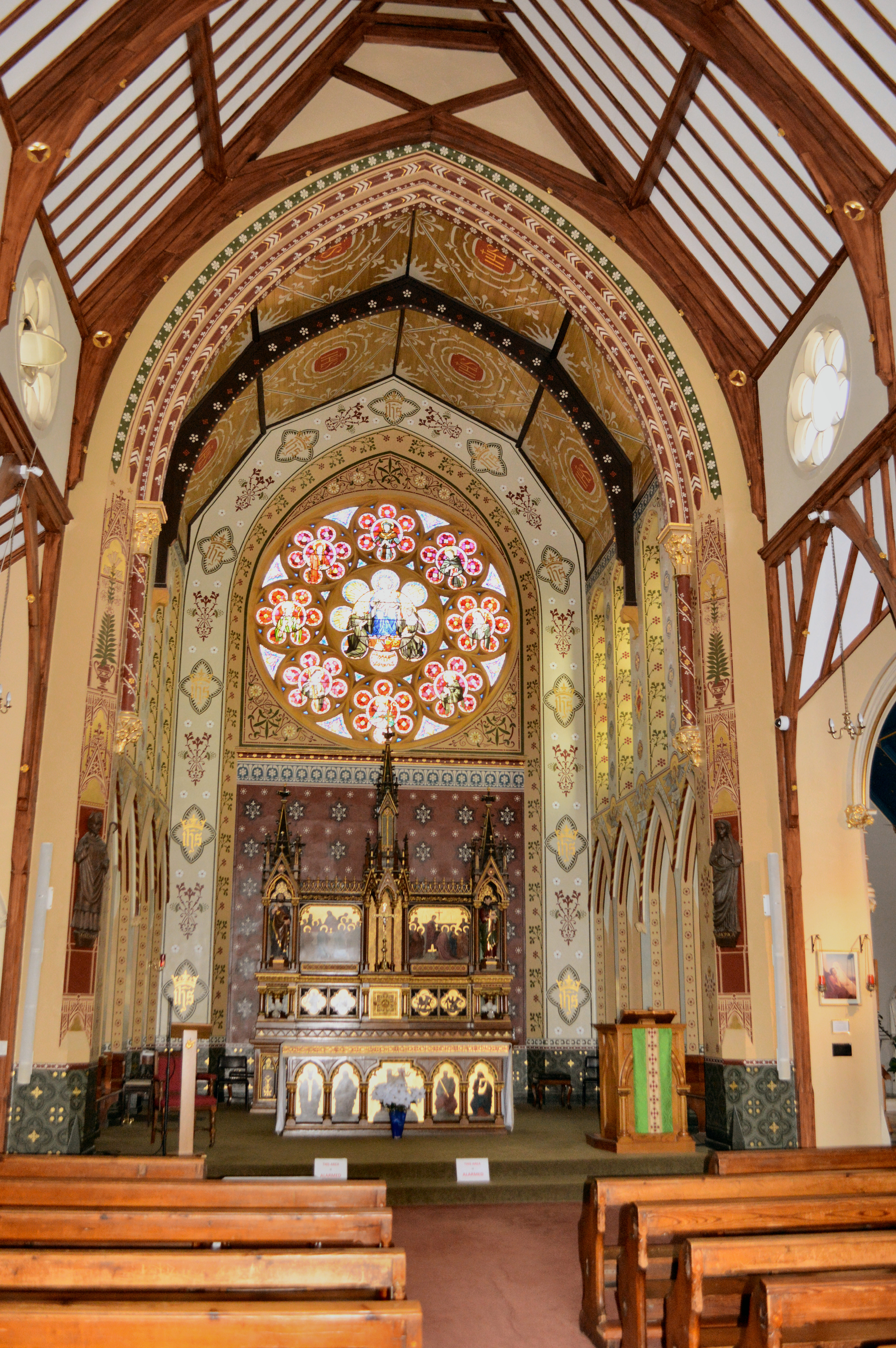
Chancel

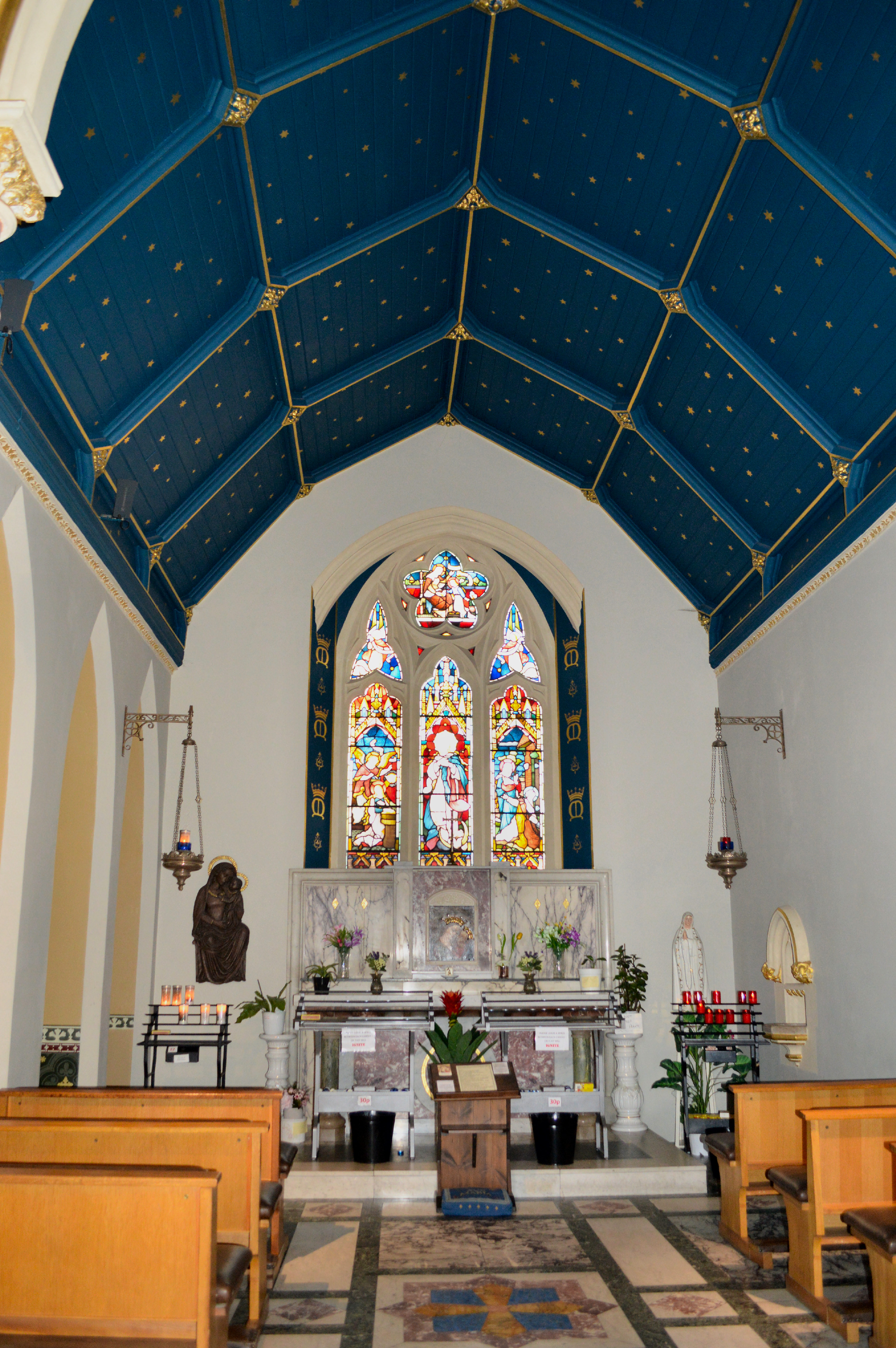
Lady chapel

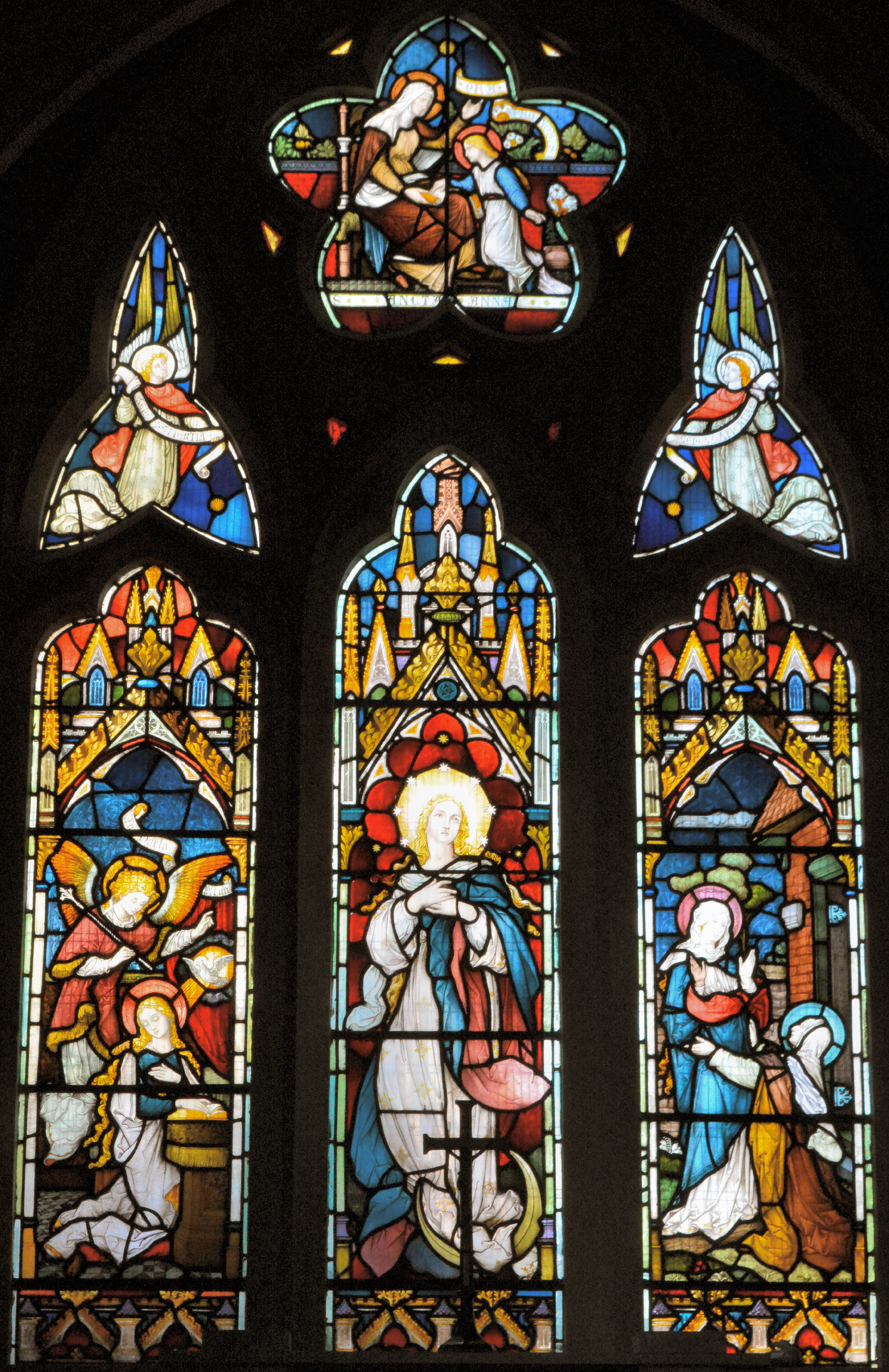
Lady chapel window

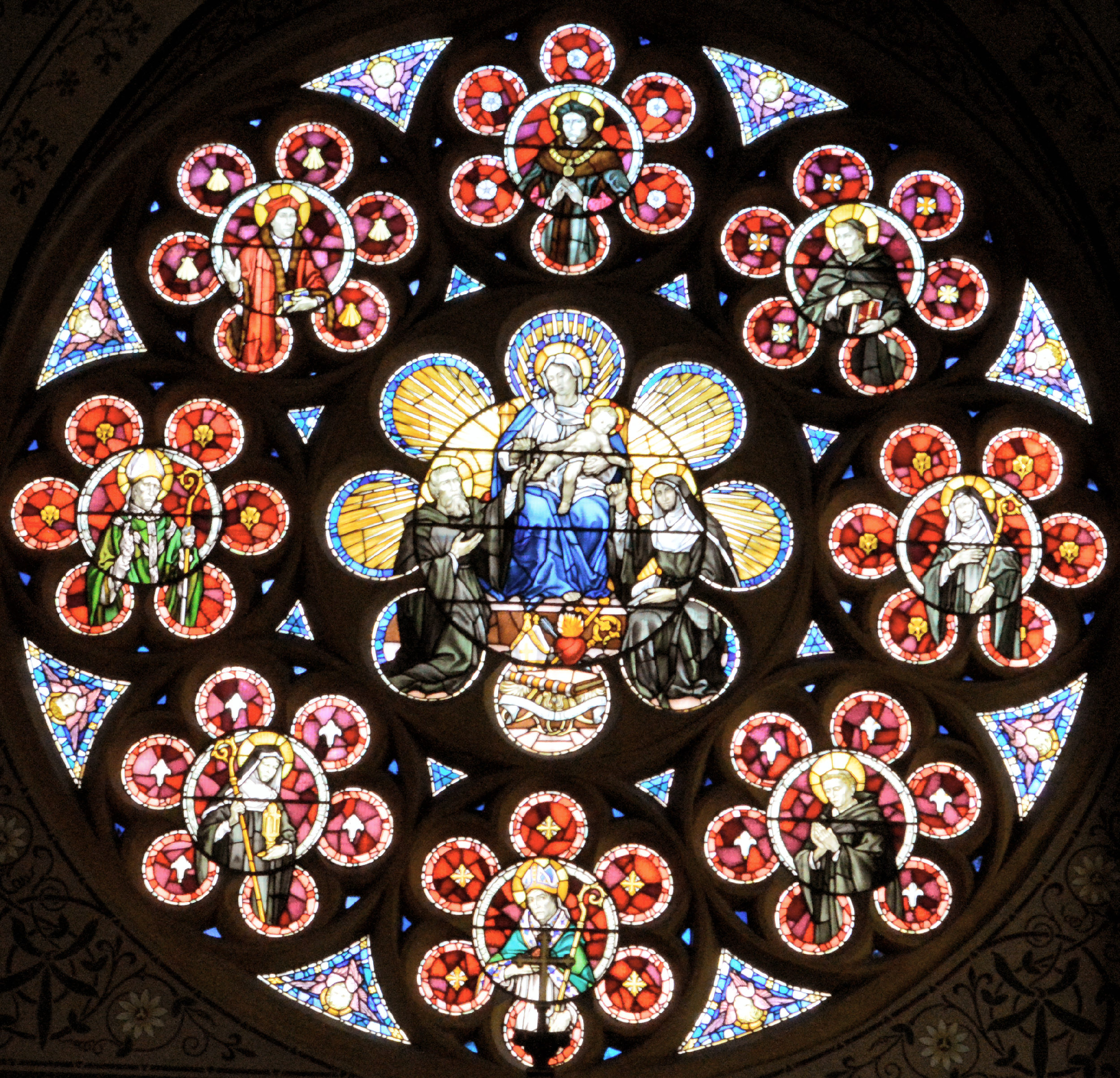
Rose window

== See also ==
- Augustinian Province of England and Scotland
