= John Stone (martyr) =

16th-century English Augustinian Catholic saint and martyr

Saint John Stone OSA
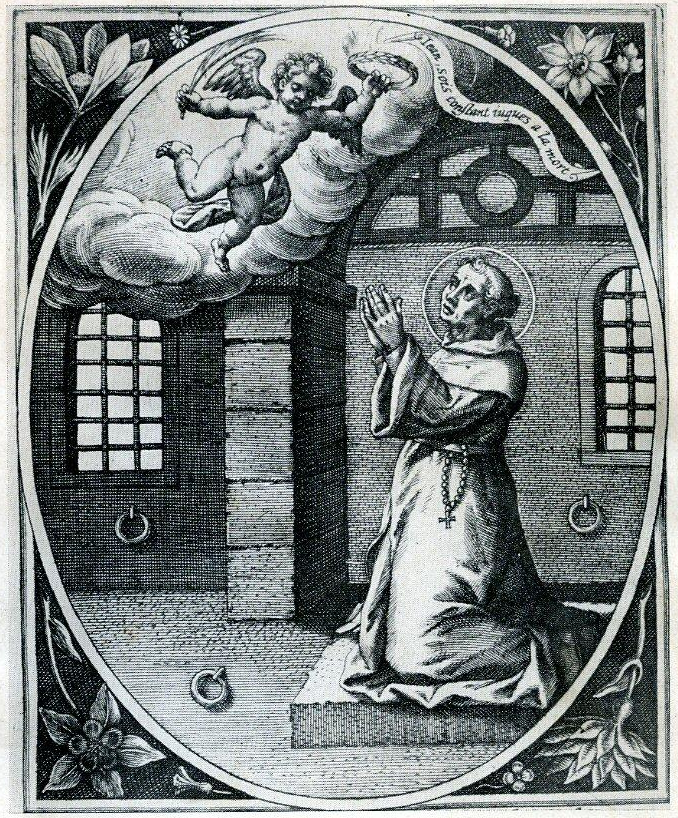

Augustinian Friar and Martyr
- Died: 7 or 27 December 1539; Canterbury, England
- Venerated in: Roman Catholic Church
- Beatified: 9 December 1886 by Pope Leo XIII
- Canonized: 25 October 1970 by Pope Paul VI
- Feast: 23 December (individual, formerly 12 May), 25 October (collectively with Forty Martyrs of England and Wales)
- Attributes: Augustinian habit, martyr's palm, shackles
- Patronage: University of Kent Catholic Society Anglican converts to Catholicism Archdiocese of Westminster

John Stone, OSA was an English Augustinian friar who was executed, probably in December 1539; he was canonized in 1970 by Pope Paul VI, and is one of the Forty Martyrs of England and Wales. He was a doctor of theology from Canterbury.

== Life ==
Nothing is known of Stone's early life, education, or activities in the Order, though it is conjectured that he joined the Augustinians at Canterbury since this is the place of his death. Stone was a doctor of theology, living in the Augustinian friary at Canterbury. The place where the Augustinian friary once stood on St George's Street is still called Whitefriars. Stone was a native of Canterbury. After his ordination, he was sent to Droitwich, where he filled the office of professor and Prior for some time before returning to Canterbury.

During the quest for supporters for the contemplated divorce of Queen Catherine, Stone was approached by the agents of the King. Being a doctor of theology, every effort was made to win his influence and to gain the weight of his opinion at the Council convoked at Canterbury; but he was resolute in his denunciation of the divorce as being contrary to the tenets of morality and justice.

During the time of the Reformation Parliament, Stone publicly denounced from the pulpit of the Austin Friars the claim of King Henry VIII to spiritual supremacy over the English Church. It may be on account of Cromwell's close intimacy with the Provincial of the Order that immediate proceedings were not taken against him at that time.

The Act of Supremacy of 1534 declared the king to be the only supreme head of the Church in England. This was followed by the Treasons Act which enjoined the penalty of high treason on anyone who might maliciously desire to deprive the king of his title of supreme head of the Church. All bishops, priests and religious were required to sign a formal document explicitly acknowledging Henry VIII as head of the church in England.

On 14 December 1538 the Bishop of Dover Richard Yngworth visited Canterbury and called on the Augustinian friary with an order to close it down as part of the dissolution of monasteries in England. He found the Austin Friars to be in great poverty. "Their debts were £40, and their implements not worth £6, except a little plate weighing 126 oz." As each friar was expelled he had to sign two documents: one acknowledging the king as supreme head of the church in England, and another declaring their surrender of their friary to be voluntary. Stone alone among his brothers refused to sign, and spoke in clear terms of his objections to the king's claims over the Church. He was immediately separated from his confreres in order to forestall his influence over them and was urged with threats to alter his position.

The visiting officers sent Stone to Thomas Cromwell in London. Cromwell failed to change Stone's mind and ordered him imprisoned in the Tower. In October 1539 he was sent back to Canterbury for trial. On 27 October 1539 a commission of Oyer et Terminer (Hear and Determine) was addressed to the Mayor of Canterbury, John Starky, and four other worthy gentlemen. Stone was tried for treason under the 1535 Treason Act, which declared that the penalty for high treason was death. There was no appeal allowed.

Being in prison Stone had been praying all the time, and it strengthened his soul not to betray his faith.

== Trial and execution ==
The trial took place in Guildhall (now demolished) in Guildhall Street. The presiding judges were the new mayor Thomas Bele, Sir Christopher Hales and probably Baron John Hales. It was a very short trial. A jury confronted with an indictment for High Treason had no alternative but to find Stone guilty. The sentence was handed down on 6 December. Stone was taken to Westgate tower to await his execution.

Usually such a sentence was carried out without delay but in this instance an extraordinary event complicated matters. Anne of Cleves, who was coming to England to be the fourth wife of King Henry VIII, was due to arrive on Sunday, 7 December 1539, and would be stopping at Canterbury overnight on her way to London. Her arrival, however, was delayed by bad weather. Her visit and Stone's execution probably happened on Saturday, 27 December 1539. Stone's execution was timed to be part of the reception festivities arranged for Anne, despite the shortness of her stay. This conclusion is deduced from the extraordinary expenses for the execution and from the fact that the paraphernalia needed for it were removed only after her departure. However, the historian Michael Benedict Hackett, who was an expert on Stone, questioned whether the execution occurred during Anne of Cleves' time in Canterbury. The bill for the execution amounted to £15.9.11d (fifteen pounds, nine shillings and eleven pence — equivalent to £13,005 in 2025). This was a great sum when compared to a previous execution which had cost only six pence.

Part of the additional expense for Stone's death was because the place of execution was not Holloway, the traditional site which had a gibbet permanently in place, but the most striking landmark of the city, the Dongeon, now called the Dane John, a prominent hillock inside the city walls near the present Canterbury East railway station. In the account books of Canterbury, there appears an expense of two shillings and six pence "Paid for a half-ton of wood to build the gallows on which Friar Stone was brought to justice." As a prisoner Stone was being carried to a hill outside the city walls. He was not only hanged there but also drawn and quartered. For him being a traitor his head and body were exhibited at the entrance to the city for everyone observing as a warning to other rebels.

"Behold I close my apostolate in my blood, in my death I shall find life, for I die for a holy cause, the defence of the Church of God, infallible and immaculate", Stone said as the executioners prepared to do their work. Stone was hanged, drawn and quartered. His heart and viscera were thrown into the fire. Because he was considered a traitor, his head and body were put on display at the entrance to the city.

== Veneration ==
Stone was soon venerated as martyr. Later in the century, Pope Gregory XIII sanctioned a painting in the English College at Rome depicting Stone as martyr, and likewise permitted an engraving of him to be printed in 1584.

Stone's name was placed at the top of the list of martyrs of the English Reformation which was presented to Rome for the process of beatification. Stone was beatified by Pope Leo XIII on 9 December 1886 and canonised by Pope Paul VI on 25 October 1970 along with other 39 English martyrs. He is one of the Forty Martyrs chosen to represent Roman Catholics martyred in England and Wales between 1535 and 1679.

Stone is patron saint of the University of Kent Catholic Society. His feast day is 12 May; the Augustinians commemorate him on 25 October.

== Iconography ==
There is a fresco of Stone - along with other Augustinian saints and blesseds - in the Our Mother of Good Counsel Church in Los Angeles.

There is an illustration of St. John Stone by János Hajnal in "Il Fascino di Dio: Profili de Agiografia Agostiniana" by Fernando Rojo Martínez, O.S.A. The original art is preserved in the office of Augustinian Postulator of Causes, in Rome.

"Saint John Stone; Austin Friar Martyr 1539" was published in 1970 by Benedict Hackett. The title page has an lithograph of Stone.

There are stained glass windows of the martyr within the following churches:

- St. Maurice at Resurrection Church, Dania Beach, in Miami.
- St. Augustine's Church, Hammersmith, London
- St. Nicholas of Tolentine Church in Philadelphia, Pennsylvania.
