= William Flete =

William Flete was a 14th-century Augustinian hermit friar, an English mystic, and lived in the latter half of the fourteenth century. He was a contemporary and friend of St. Catherine of Siena.

== Biography ==
William Flete was born about 1320 in the village of Fleet in southeast Lincolnshire, England. He was educated at Cambridge and afterwards joined the Austin Friars in England, presumably at Boston, the nearest friary.

Desiring a stricter observance to the rule than they were living, and hearing that there were two monasteries of his order which had returned to primitive discipline near Siena, he set out for Italy. On reaching the forest of Lecceto, near Siena, in which one of these monasteries stood, he found the place, which abounded in caves, suited to the contemplative life. With the consent of his superiors he joined this community. Henceforth he spent his days in study and contemplation in one of these caves, and returned to the monastery at night to sleep. He was called the "Bachelor of the Wood"; here he became acquainted with St. Catherine, who occasionally visited him at Lecceto and went to confession to him. He had so great a love for solitude, that he declined to leave it when invited by Pope Urban VI to go to Rome, to assist him with his counsel at the time of the papal schisms then disturbing the Church.

For at least nineteen years he led a most holy and austere life in this wood, and is said by Torellus to have returned to England, immediately after St. Catherine's death in 1383, and, after introducing the reform of Lecceto, to have died the same year. Others say he spent the rest of his life at Lecceto. There is no mention of his death in the book of the dead at Lecceto. He was considered a saint by his contemporaries.

== Works ==
He wrote a long panegyric on St. Catherine at her death, which, with another of his works, is preserved in the public library at Siena.

His works consist of six manuscripts:

- an epistle to the provincial of his order
- a letter to the doctors of the province
- an epistle to the brethren in general
- predictions to the English of calamities coming upon England (in this he prophesied that England would abandon Catholicism)
- diverse epistles
- a treatise on remedies against temptations. A fifteenth-century manuscript of this last was presented by George I to the University Library at Cambridge.

Only Remedies Against Temptations (a Middle English version of De remediis contra temptationes) has been printed.

== Sources ==
- William Flete, 'Remedies against Temptations: The Third English Version of William Flete', ed. Eric Colledge and Noel Chadwick, Archivio Italiano per la Storia della Pieta`, Vol. 5, pp. 201–240 (Rome, 1968).
- Michael Benedict Hackett, 'William Flete's "De Remediis contra temptationes" in its Latin and English Recensions. The Growth of a Text' Medieval Studies, Vol. 26 (1964), pp. 210–230.
- William Flete, "Remedies Against Temptations"
