= St Augustine's Church, Hammersmith =

St Augustine's Church
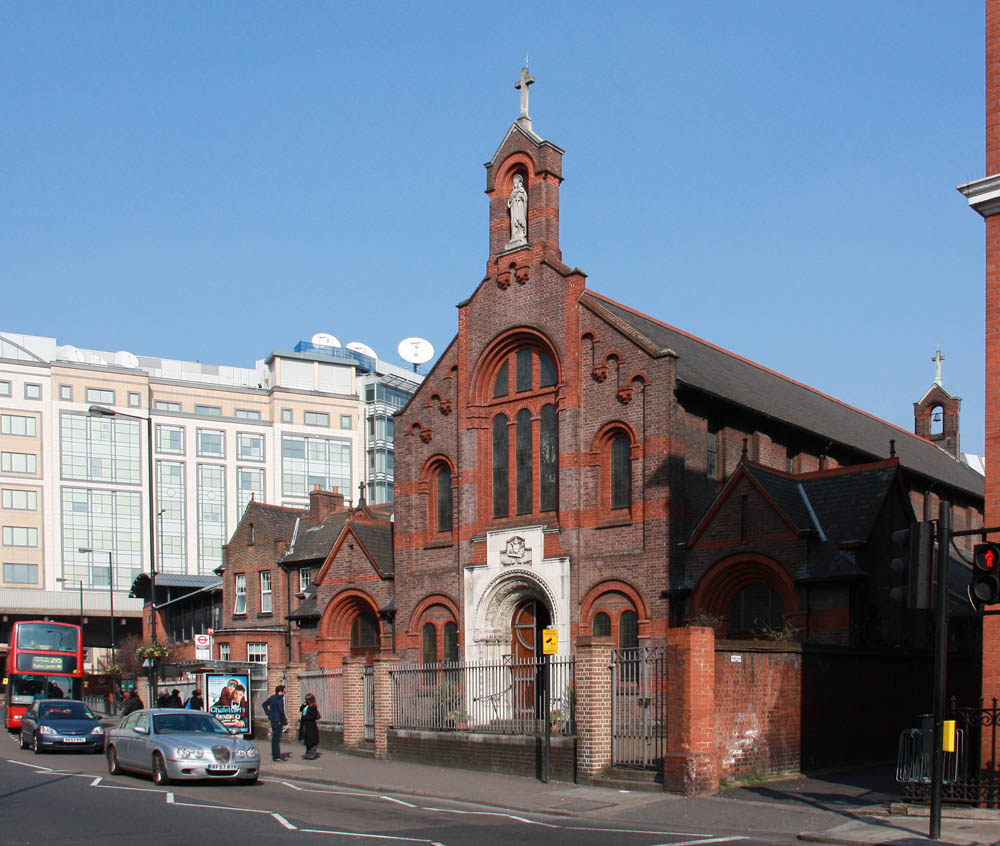
- St Augustine's Church
- 51.4905334°N 0.2231233°W
- Location: Hammersmith
- Country: England
- Denomination: Roman Catholic
- Religious institute: Augustinians
- Website: parish.rcdow.org.uk/hammersmith

History
- Status: Active
- Founded: 1903
- Dedication: Augustine of Hippo

Architecture
- Architect: Robert Leabon Curtis
- Style: Romanesque revival
- Groundbreaking: March 1915
- Completed: 14 October 1916

Administration
- Archdiocese: Westminster
- Deanery: Hammersmith

St Augustine's Church is a Roman Catholic parish church in Hammersmith, London, England. It is a Romanesque revival style church and was built in 1916. It is located on Fulham Palace Road, south of the Hammersmith Flyover. It was founded by Augustinian Friars from St Monica's Church in Hoxton who continue to serve the church.

== History ==
=== Construction ===
In 1903, the Archbishop of Westminster Herbert Vaughan invited the Augustinian Friars in Hoxton to come to Hammersmith and start a mission serving the local immigrant Irish Catholic community. A building was bought at 71 Comeragh Road to house a chapel and the friars. It was opened on Easter Sunday, 12 April 1903. Afterwards, the site of the current church was bought. On 16 September 1903, a temporary iron church on the site was opened. In March 1915, during the First World War, the foundation stone for St Augustine's Church was laid. The church was designed by Robert Leabon Curtis. On 14 October 1916, the church was opened.

The original London Irish Welfare Bureau was founded by the early friars. It was based for many years in the church's parish centre, until it was formally established as an independent charity in 1974 and relocated to its own building in Hammersmith Grove. It closed in 2013.

=== Developments ===
In 1920, a new altar was added to the chapel of St Nicholas of Tolentino. In 1933, the church was consecrated. In 1952 a window depicting Nicholas of Tolentino was installed. The central panel in the stained glass windows above the main entrance includes a depiction of Hammersmith Bridge, conveying the founding community's commitment to the local area.

In 1960, a new altar, designed by Donald Plaskett Marshall, was installed the lady chapel. In 1988, the church underwent a renovation with a new altar, ambo and font being installed.

In 2018, the church underwent a refurbishment that included works and designs by Julian Stair and John Morgan. The church has since been further added to by pieces commissioned by the Augustinian community from other craftsmen, including a new central altar and tabernacle, and gilding work on the pillars.

== Parish ==
The church holds a Saturday Vigil Mass at 6:00pm and four Sunday Masses at 9:00am, 10:30am, 12:15pm and 6.30pm. There are weekday Masses 8:00am and 12:15pm Monday to Friday and at 12:15pm on Saturday. All services are currently live-streamed online at churchservices.tv.

== Old Interior shot ==
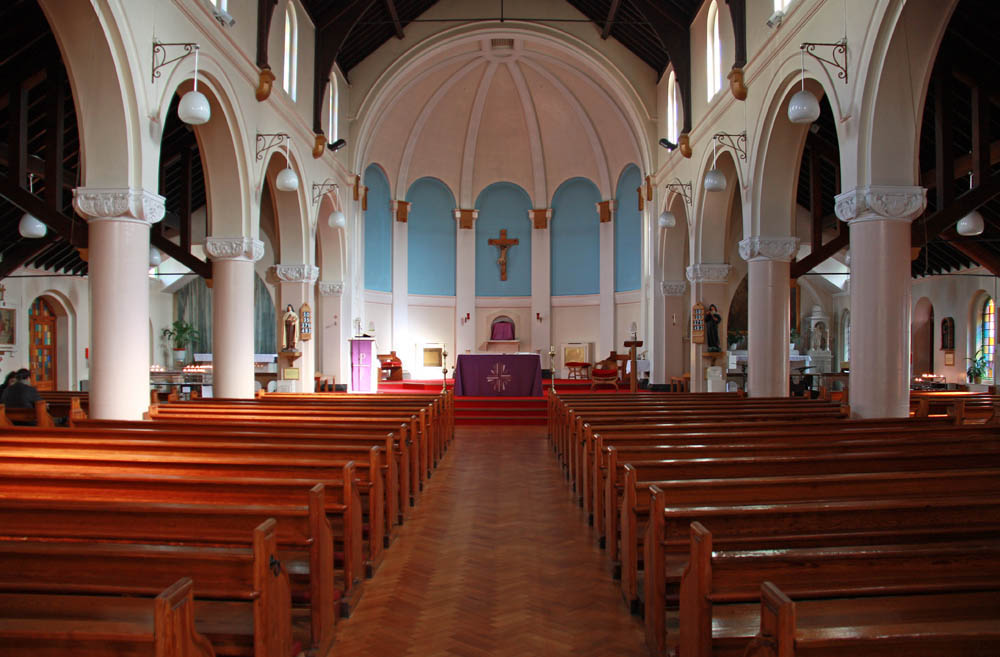
Interior

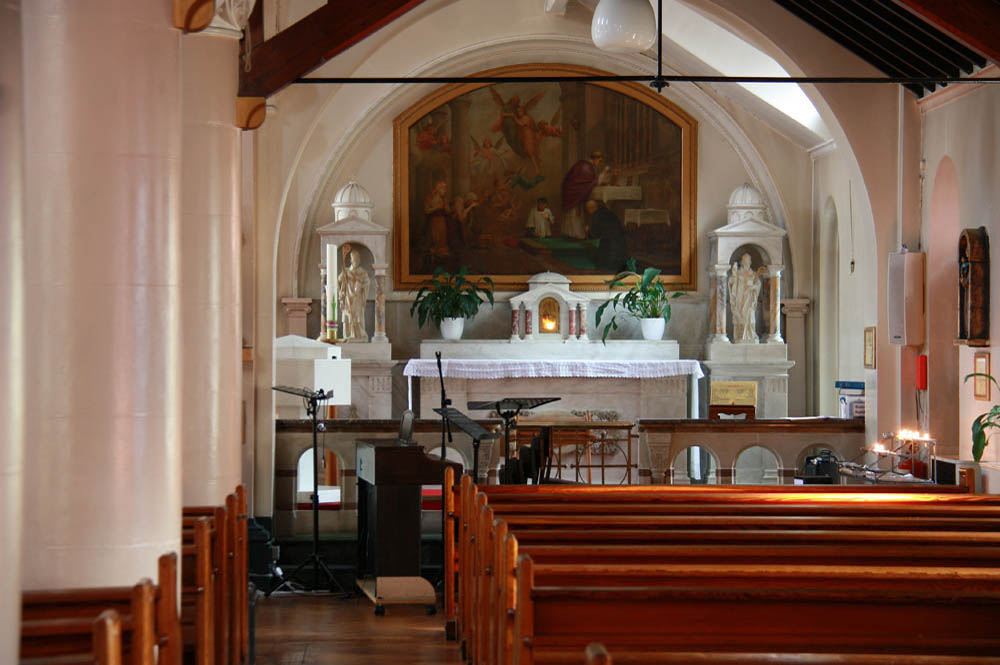
Side chapel

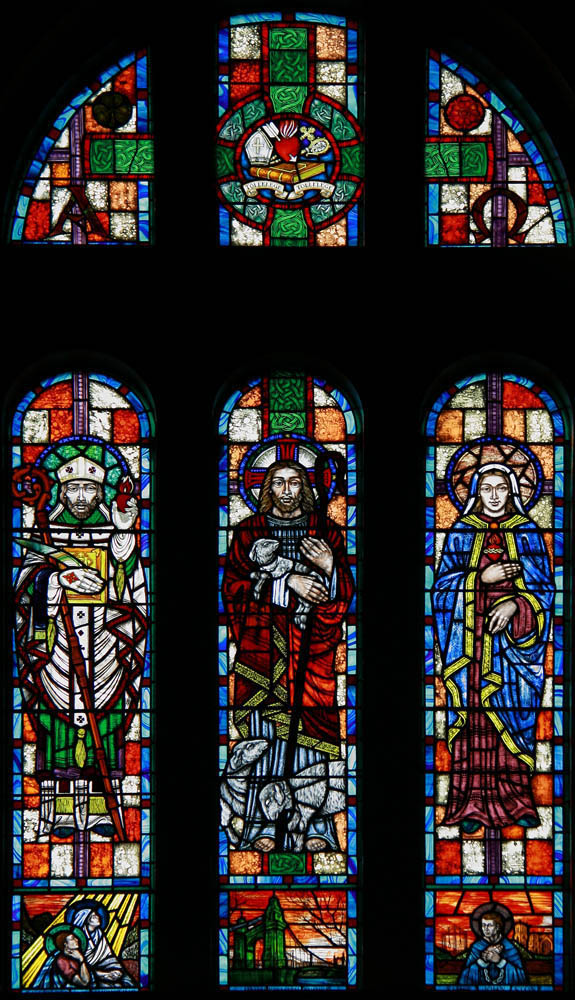
Stained glass

== See also ==
- Archdiocese of Westminster
