= St Mary's Church, Harborne =

St Mary's Church, Harborne, Birmingham
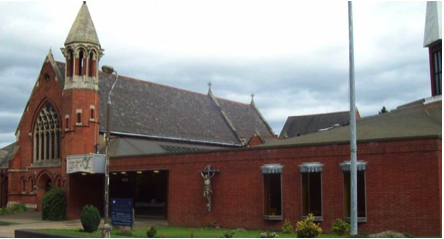
- Church entrance
- St Mary's Church, Harborne, Birmingham
- 52°25′25.61″N 1°55′32.40″W
- OS grid reference: SP 03248 84302
- Location: Harborne
- Country: England
- Denomination: Roman Catholic
- Website: saintmarysharborne.org.uk

Architecture
- Groundbreaking: 8 September 1875

Administration
- Diocese: Roman Catholic Archdiocese of Birmingham
- Parish: Harborne

St Mary's Church is a Roman Catholic parish church in Harborne, Birmingham. It is situated on Vivian Road next to St Mary's Primary School. It was founded by the Passionists in 1875 and is currently served by the Augustinians.

== History ==
The first congregation was formed by the Passionists who worshipped in a disused Methodist Chapel on Harborne High Street from 1870. Building work started on the current St Mary's Church, in Vivian Road, on 8 September 1875 and it opened on 6 February 1877.

It had long been felt that the old house at the rear, Harborne Lodge, was too confined and inconvenient for a religious community. Accordingly, a new Retreat was planned, linking up the original house with the present church. With impressive ceremonial the new building was blessed and opened towards the end of May 1911 by the Bishop of Birmingham Edward Ilsley.

== Interior ==
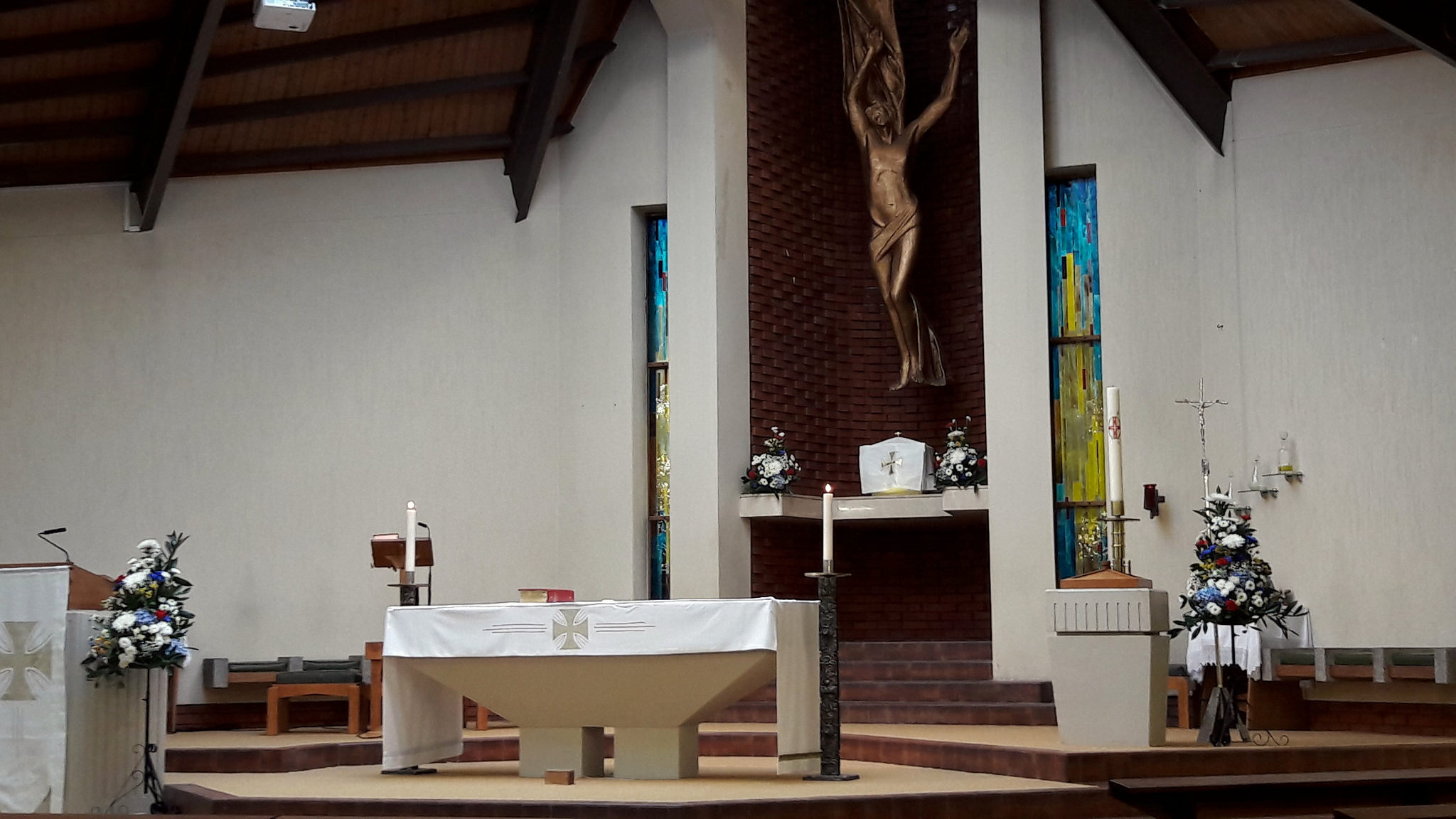
Interior

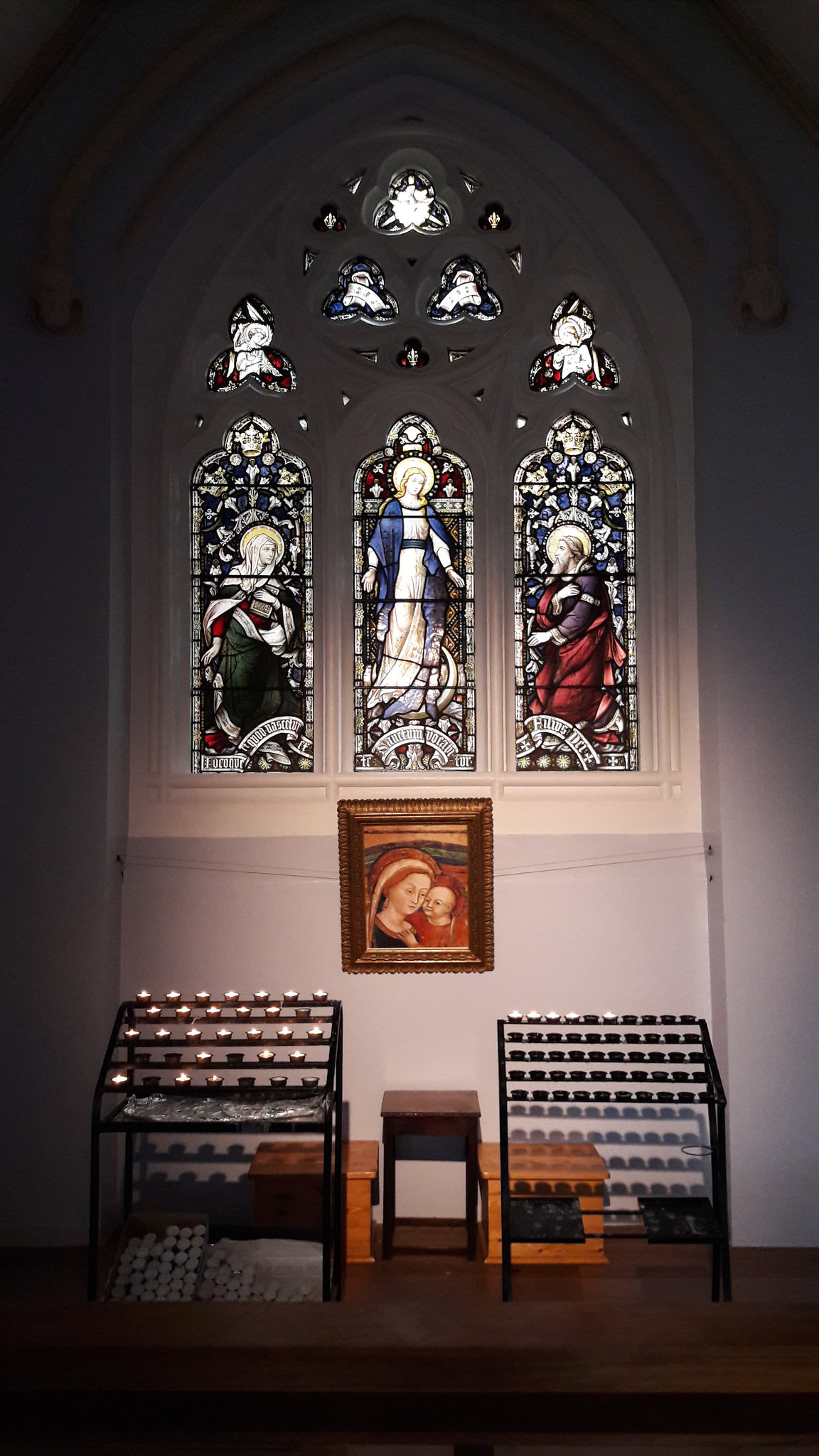
Shrine to St Mary
