= Austin Friars =

Private day school in Cumbria, England

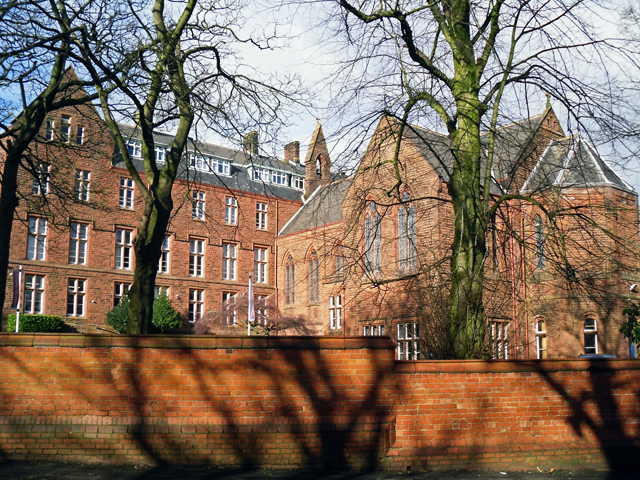

Location
- Etterby Scaur; Carlisle, Cumbria, CA3 9PB; United Kingdom; 54.908°N 2.947°W

Information
- Type: Private day school
- Motto: In Omnibus Caritas (Latin: In All Things Charity)
- Religious affiliation: Catholicism/Christian
- Established: 1951
- Department for Education URN: 112453 Tables
- Chair of the Board of Trustees: Ewen Swinton
- Headmaster: Chris Hattam
- Staff: 70 (approx.)
- Gender: Co-educational
- Age: 3 to 18
- Enrolment: 425 (approx.)
- Houses: Clare; Lincoln; Stafford
- Colours: Maroon & Blue
- Website: www.austinfriars.co.uk

Austin Friars is a coeducational private day school located in Carlisle, England. The Senior School provides secondary education for 350 boys and girls aged 11–18. There are 150 children aged 4–11 in the Junior School and the Nursery has places for 16 children aged 3–4. Founded by the Augustinian friars in 1951, it is one of the network of Augustinian schools in other parts of the world and welcomes pupils of all denominations.

== History ==
At the request of the Diocese of Lancaster, the Order of Saint Augustine founded Austin Friars School, a day and boarding grammar school, to provide a Catholic education for boys in Cumbria and the city of Carlisle. The property was originally used by the Sisters of the Sacred Heart who had founded a school there before leaving for Newcastle upon Tyne in 1903 (and subsequently establishing Sacred Heart Catholic High School) and the Poor Sisters of Nazareth who ran an orphanage. It was then acquired by the Augustinians in 1951 and has been occupied by the school ever since. Girls were admitted in 1986. Boarding ceased in 1998 due to declining interest.

St Monica's, a coeducational junior school, was founded by parents as an independent charity when St Gabriel's closed. It was relocated to the same site as Austin Friars in 1985.

The two schools legally merged in 2003 and were renamed Austin Friars St Monica's School. It became a trust after the last Augustinian priest, Father Bernard Rolls, who had himself been a pupil at the school, left for another assignment in 2005. Since then, the school has been operated entirely by lay staff and board of governors. It maintains its Catholic ethos and religious character.

In September 2015, the School was renamed as 'Austin Friars'.
