= St Mary on the Quay =

Coordinates: 51.4545°N 2.5972°W

St Mary on the Quay Church
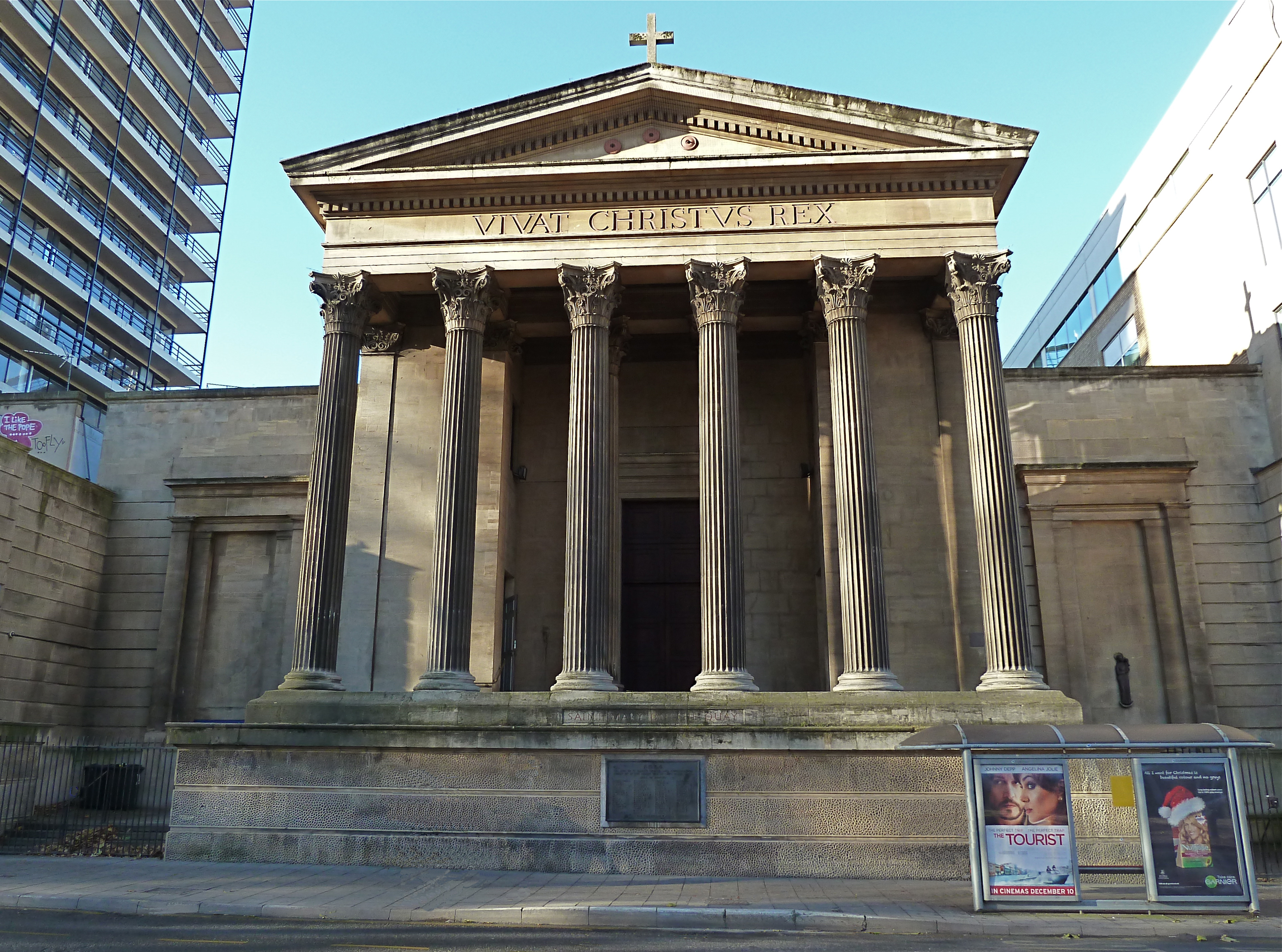
- Front entrance

- Location in Bristol St Mary on the Quay Church (England)
- Location: Bristol
- Country: England
- Denomination: Roman Catholic
- Previous denomination: Catholic Apostolic Church
- Website: St Mary site

History
- Former name: Irvingite chapel
- Status: Active
- Dedication: Blessed Virgin Mary
- Dedicated: 1843

Architecture
- Functional status: Parish church
- Heritage designation: Grade II* listed
- Architect: R. S. Pope
- Style: Neoclassical
- Groundbreaking: 1839
- Completed: 1840

Administration
- Province: Birmingham
- Diocese: Clifton
- Deanery: St Edmund of Abingdon

Listed Building – Grade II*
- Official name: Roman Catholic Church of St Mary on the Quay
- Designated: 8 January 1959
- Reference no.: 1052289

St Mary on the Quay is a Roman Catholic Parish church in Bristol, England. It is situated on Colston Avenue, next to Beacon Tower in the centre of the city. It is the oldest Roman Catholic church in Bristol; the first one built after the Reformation. it was formerly administered by the Society of Jesus and is currently served by the Divine Word Missionaries. It is a Grade II* listed building.

== History ==
=== Foundation ===
From the 1740s, Catholics in Bristol could pray in a private chapel, on St James Back (which was later renamed as Silver Street). The chapel's own records date from 1777. With the Catholic population of the city increasing, a new, larger place of worship had to be sought. In 1786, the Earl of Arundel paid for a new site on Trenchard Street for a chapel, which became St Joseph Chapel. Construction work on the new chapel began in March 1788. On 27 June 1790, it was opened and congregation moved to the new chapel. The St James Back chapel was sold off that year.

=== Construction ===
The St Mary on the Quay church building was originally intended to be a chapel for the Catholic Apostolic Church (also called 'Irvingites') in Bristol. It was designed by Richard Shackleton Pope and construction began in 1839. It was built in a Neoclassical style and completed in 1840. However, the Irvingite congregation could not afford the church. Meanwhile, St Joseph Chapel was becoming too small to hold the increasing numbers of parishioners and it was a very short distance from the Irvingite chapel. In 1843, the Catholics bought it and renamed it St Mary on the Quay Church.

The purchase of St Mary's was necessitated by the failure of a more ambitious project led by the Reverend Francis Edgeworth. In 1834, Edgeworth had commissioned a massive Neoclassical church dedicated to the Holy Apostles on Honeypen Hill (the site of the future Pro-Cathedral of the Holy Apostles). However, the project was hampered by geological instability, including landslides in 1842, and Edgeworth's own financial difficulties. During this period, Edgeworth also held the title to the site of the former Georgian Armoury in Easton (1840–1844), now Armoury Square. His eventual bankruptcy and flight to Belgium in the late 1840s left the Clifton project unfinished, leading the Catholic community to pivot and purchase St Mary's instead.

=== Establishment ===
The first priest was a Franciscan, Fr Patrick O'Farrell. He served the parish until 1857. That year, the parish was handed over to the Society of Jesus.

The St Joseph Chapel continued as a place of worship until 19 November 1871. It was turned into a school and parish hall for St Mary on the Quay Church.

When the church was built, the Bristol Floating Harbour came to the front the church. There were boating rings in the front wall so that boats could be tied to the church, while they were docked at the harbour. In 1893, the harbour was covered over and now a road, Colston Avenue, is in front of the church. The boating rings were later removed.

In 1978, the parish hall, the old St Joseph Chapel, was sold to become housing. In May 1981, it was demolished with only the façade remaining.

The Jesuits administered the parish until 1996, when the church was placed under the care of the Diocese of Clifton. In 2004, the Bishop of Clifton, Declan Lang, invited the Divine Word Missionaries to serve the parish which they continue to do.

== Archives ==
Archives for St Mary on the Quay church, Bristol (and the preceding chapel, St Joseph's Chapel, Bristol) are held at Bristol Archives (Ref. 37553) (online catalogue) including baptism, confirmation, marriage and death registers. The archive also includes registers of sick calls and records of the Heavens Orphanage, schools and societies.

== Parish ==
There are four Sunday Masses held in the church. The first one is at 6:15pm on Saturday evening, then 9:30am and 11:00am on Sunday morning and at 5:15pm on Sunday evening.

== Gallery ==
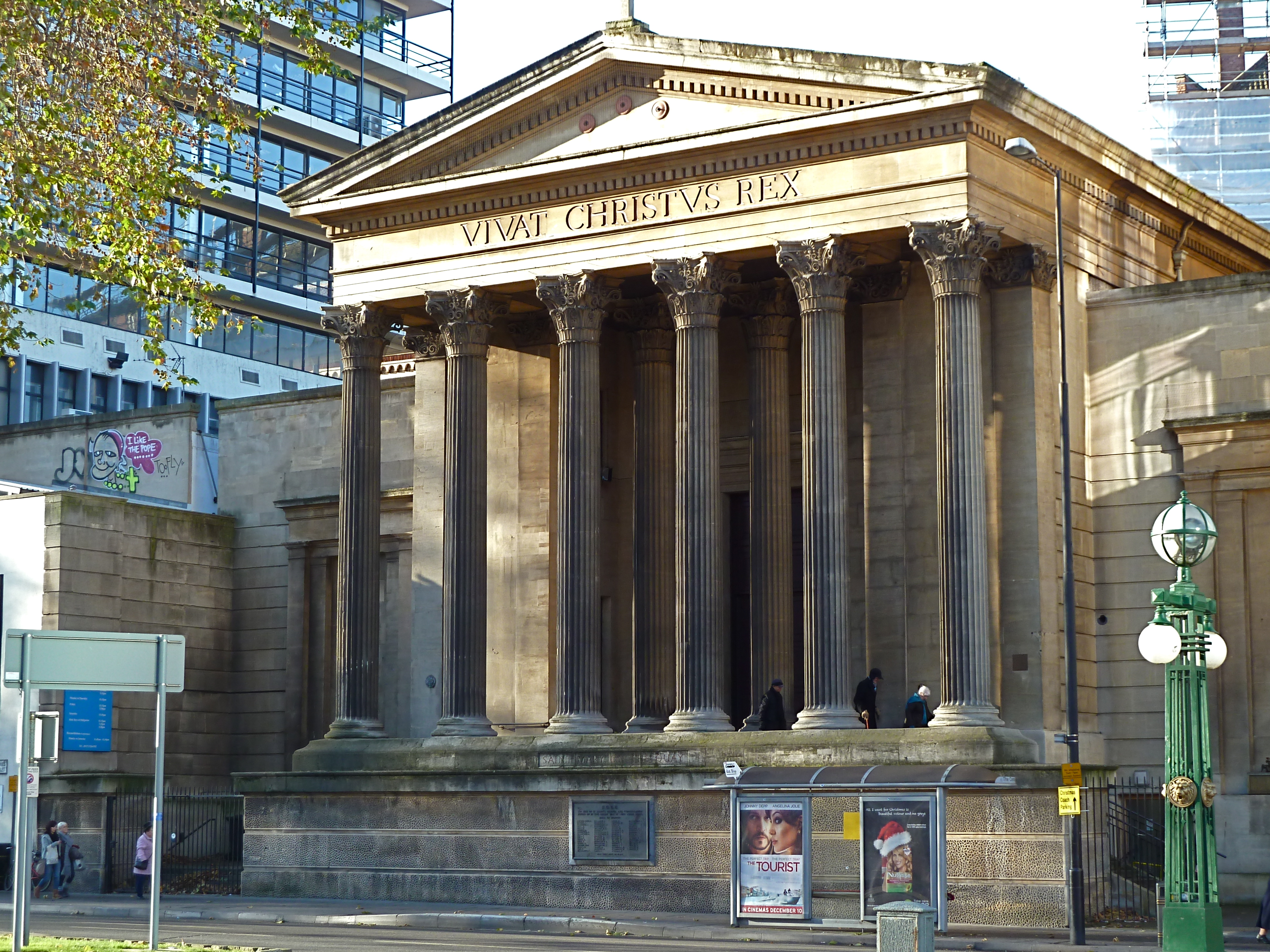
View across Colston Avenue

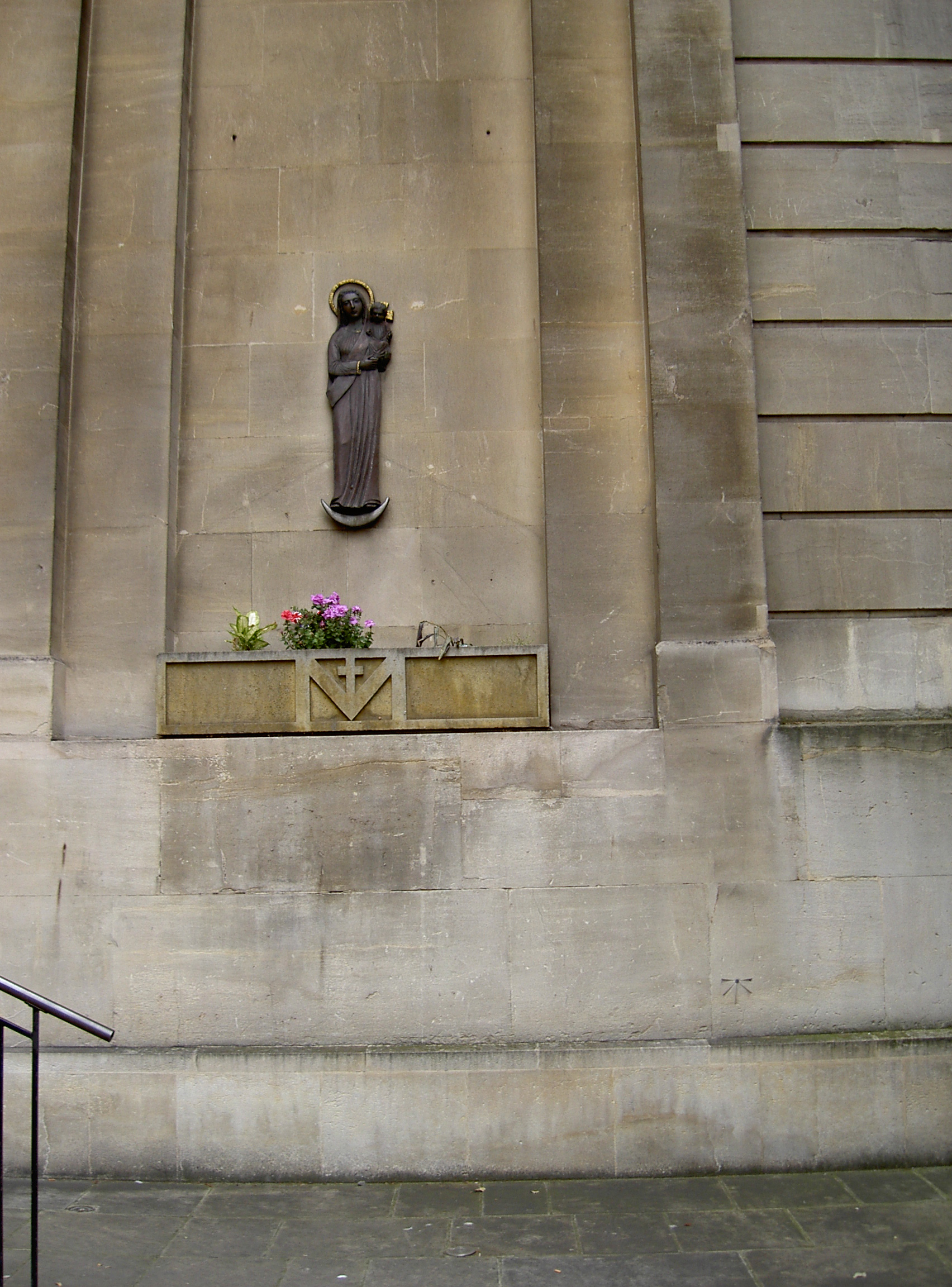
Statue on wall

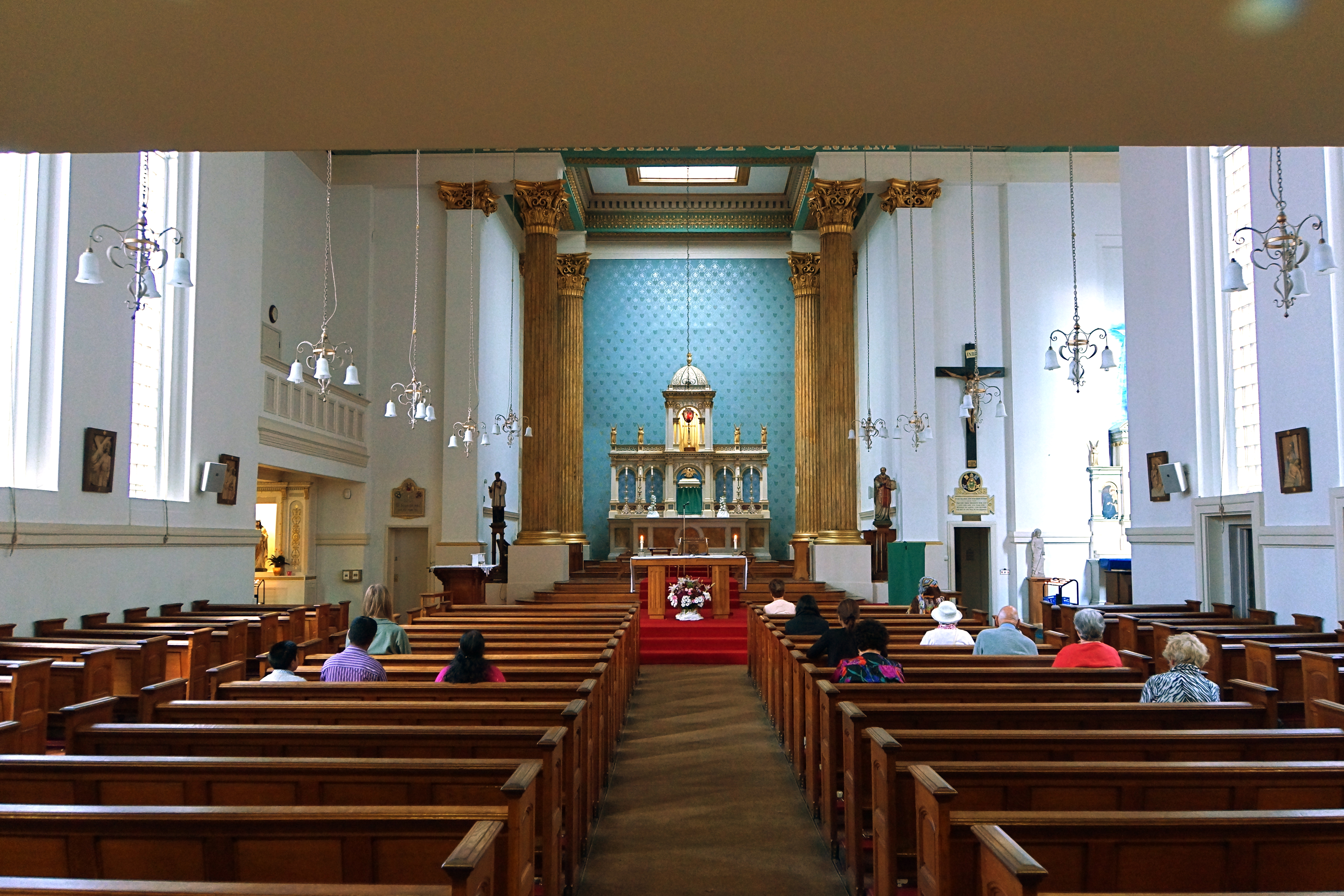
Interior

== See also ==
- Churches in Bristol
- Grade II* listed buildings in Bristol
