= St Joseph's Church, Weston-super-Mare =

Church in Somerset, England

St Joseph's Church
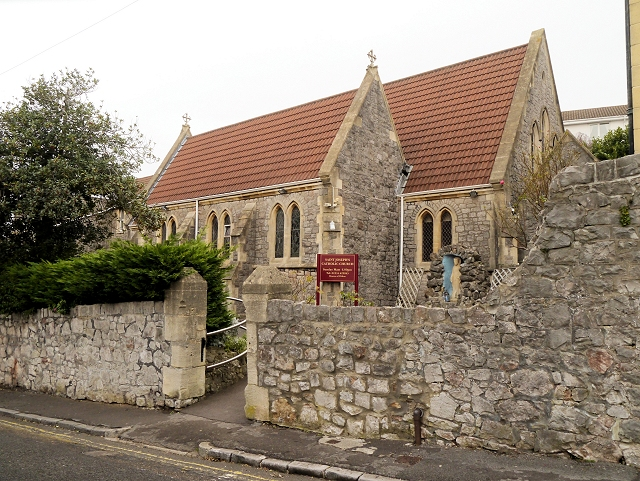

- Location within Somerset Location within England
- 51.355882°N 2.992063°W
- Location: Weston-super-Mare
- Country: England
- Denomination: Roman Catholic
- Website: StJosephsWSM.org.uk

History
- Status: Parish church
- Founder: Joseph Ruscombe Poole
- Dedication: Saint Joseph
- Consecrated: 26 October 1958

Architecture
- Functional status: Active
- Architect(s): Charles Francis Hansom; Alexander Scoles
- Style: Gothic Revival
- Groundbreaking: 8 July 1858

Administration
- Province: Birmingham
- Diocese: Clifton
- Deanery: St Dunstan
- Parish: St Joseph

St Joseph's Church is a Roman Catholic parish church in Weston-super-Mare, Somerset, England. It was built in 1858, and was designed by Charles Francis Hansom and extended by Alexander Scoles in 1893. It is located on Camp Road to the north of the town centre. It was first Catholic church to be built in Weston-super-Mare since the Reformation and it is in the Gothic Revival style.

== History ==
=== Construction ===
In 1806, a mission was started in Weston-super-Mare. The priest was a Franciscan Fr Pascal O'Farrell. He bought Greenfield Cottage so that Mass could be celebrated there. Around 1858, a local convert to Catholicism and lawyer to the Bishop of Clifton, William Clifford, Joseph Ruscombe Poole, bought Westgate House, the current site of the church. He commissioned the architect Charles F. Hansom to design the church, paid for its construction and provided an annual stipend of £50 for the priest. The stone that was used to build the church was donated by the owner of the Worlebury Hill quarry, John Hugh Smyth-Pigott. On 8 July 1858, the foundation stone was laid by Ruscombe Poole's son. The church was designed so that it could be later extended. It was opened before Christmas 1858.

=== Extension ===
In 1893, the church was extended. The architect who was behind the extensions was Alexander Scoles. Side chapels, a sacristy, and a loft for the organ were added. The side chapels were donated by the Smyth-Pigott family. In 1901, the current presbytery was built next to the church. On 26 October 1958, the church was consecrated. In the late 1990s, the old parish hall was demolished and replaced with housing. In February 1999, a current parish hall was opened. In 2007, the last resident priest at the church left, he was the retired Bishop of Clifton, Mervyn Alexander.

== Parish ==
After the construction of the church, it served as a centre from which missions were started in other parts of Weston-super-Mare. These missions eventually grew to become parish churches in their own right. In 1921, a mission was started in the centre of Weston-super-Mare. It would become Corpus Christi Church. The church was built from 1928 to 1929 in the Romanesque Revival style and cost a total of £16,000. In 1923, the mission for Our Lady of Lourdes Church was started in Milton in the east of the town. Our Lady of Lourdes Church was built in 1938 in the Gothic Revival style and cost £4,000. Each church remains a parish in the town, with the same parish priest. St Joseph's Church has one Sunday Mass at 6:00pm. Corpus Christi Church has Sunday Masses at 6:00pm on Saturday and at 11:00am on Sunday, with a Mass in Polish at 9:00am and a Syro-Malabar Mass at 3:00pm. Our Lady of Lourdes Church has a Sunday Mass at 9:15am.

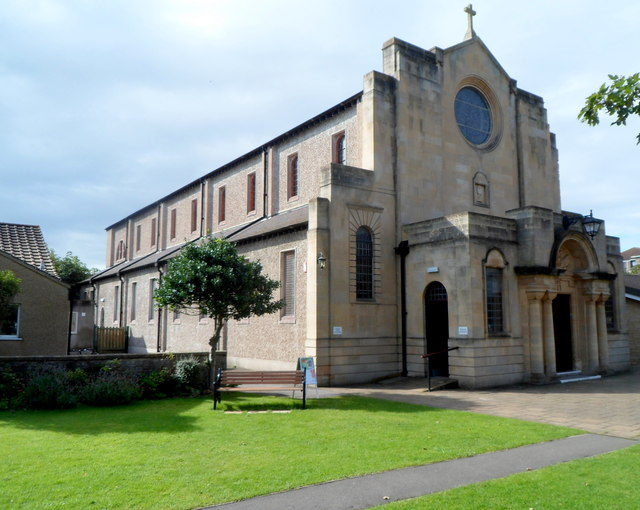
Corpus Christi Church

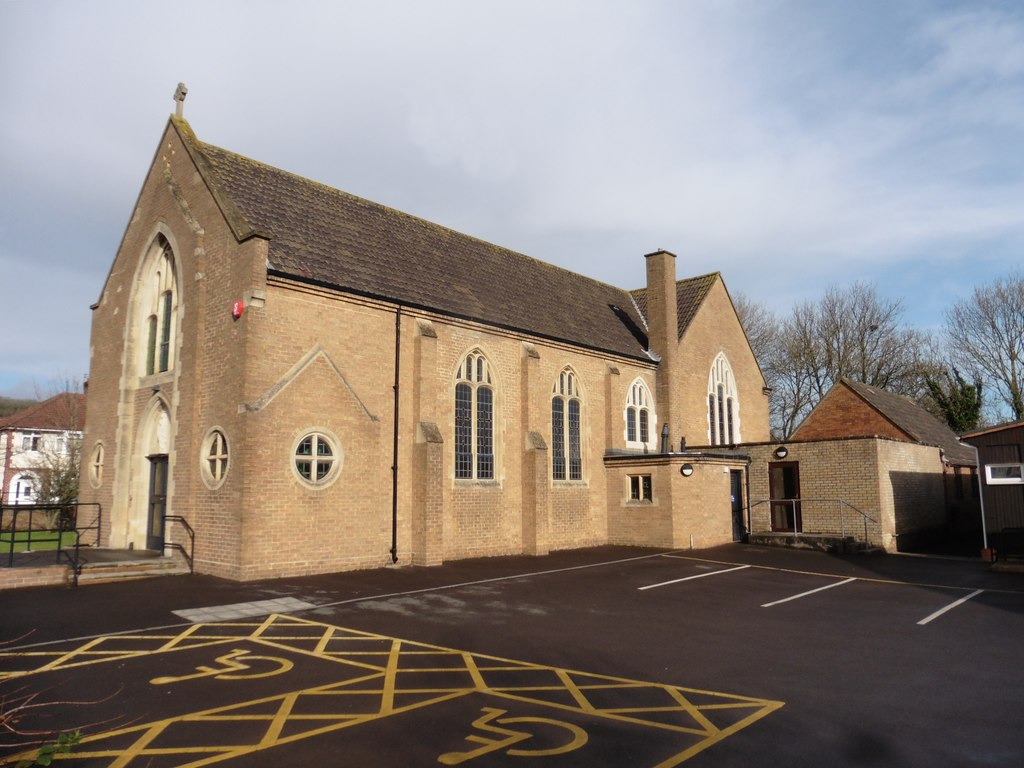
Our Lady of Lourdes Church

== See also ==
- Diocese of Clifton
