= Holy Rood Church, Swindon =

Holy Rood Church
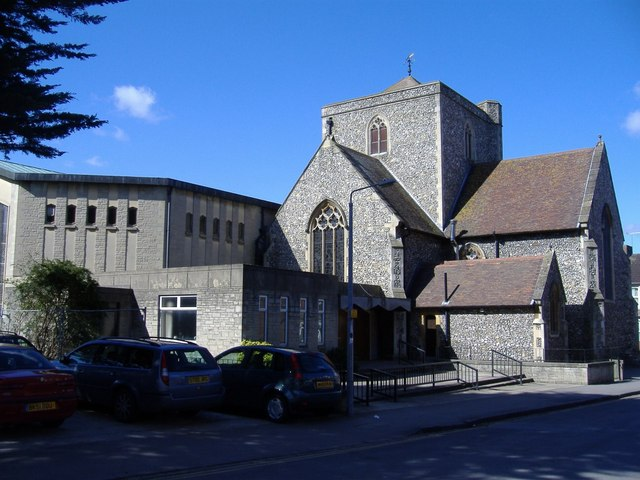

- Location within Wiltshire Location within England
- 51.558505°N 1.778172°W
- OS grid reference: SU 15474 84425
- Location: Swindon
- Country: England
- Denomination: Roman Catholic
- Website: HolyRoodSwindon.co.uk

History
- Status: Parish church
- Dedication: Feast of the Cross
- Consecrated: 1 September 1932
- Events: Moved in 1882; Rebuilt in 1905

Architecture
- Functional status: Active
- Architect: Edward Doran Webb
- Style: Gothic Revival
- Completed: 1905

Administration
- Province: Birmingham
- Diocese: Clifton
- Deanery: St Aldhelm

Holy Rood Church is a Roman Catholic parish church in Swindon, Wiltshire, England. It was founded in 1851 as a chapel and was rebuilt as a church in 1905. It is situated on the corner of Groundwell Road and Lincoln Street in the centre of the town. It was designed by Edward Doran Webb as a Gothic Revival church and was the first Roman Catholic church built in and around the town since the Reformation.

== History ==
=== Foundation ===
In 1848, two years before the Restoration of the English hierarchy, a Roman Catholic mission was started in Swindon. A priest would come from St Thomas of Canterbury Church in Fairford to say Mass once a month in the town.

In 1851, a chapel was built in the town between Regent Street and Sanford Street. From 1857, the chapel had its own resident priest. By 1882, the chapel was seen to be too small to accommodate the increasing local Catholic congregation so they bought a disused Unitarian church in Regent Circus in the town. The church was built by the Unitarians in the 1860s, on the site of an old chapel made of iron. The church was completed in 1875 and cost £2,500. It was a Gothic Revival church. In 1887, a vestry was added to the church.

=== Construction ===
In the 1900s, with the local Catholic population increasing, plans were made to build a new, larger church. The architect Edward Doran Webb was commissioned to design the church. He was also the architect of the Birmingham Oratory. The new church, on Groundwell Road, was also in the Gothic Revival style. In 1905, the church was opened.

From 1926, efforts were made by the parish priest, Canon J. J. Noonan, to raise between £6,000 and £7,000, to pay the debt from the construction of the church. Six years later, the debt was paid off. On 1 September 1932, the church was consecrated by the Bishop of Clifton, William Lee.

== Parish ==
The church is situated next to Holy Rood Catholic Primary School.

The church has five Masses celebrating the Sunday liturgy: 6:15 p.m. on Saturday; and 8:00 a.m., 9:30 a.m., 11:00 a.m., and 5:30 p.m. on Sunday.

== See also ==
- Roman Catholic Diocese of Clifton
