= Henry Wakefield (bishop of Birmingham) =

Henry Russell Wakefield (1 December 1854 – 9 January 1933) was an Anglican bishop and author in the first quarter of the 20th century. Born on 1 December 1854 he was educated at Tonbridge School and the University of Bonn. Ordained in 1877 after a period at Ripon College Cuddesdon, following two London curacies he was Incumbent at several parishes before senior posts as Prebendary of St Paul's Cathedral, Dean of Norwich and finally Bishop of Birmingham. He was also a member of the London School Board representing the Marylebone Division from 1897 to 1900 and Mayor of St Marylebone from 1903 to 1905.

Wakefield was politically active and a close associate of both Sir Henry Campbell-Bannerman and H H Asquith, Liberal Prime Ministers. At that time, since bishoprics were Crown appointments, the Prime Minister was the key figure in the process and, in 1907, Campbell-Bannerman nominated Wakefield for Bishop of Chichester. The King, Edward VII, asked Campbell-Bannerman to reconsider the appointment and consult the Archbishop of Canterbury who described Wakefield as 'not a very refined or scholarly or cultured man'. Eventually Charles Ridgway, the Dean of Carlisle, was appointed to Chichester and in 1911, Wakefield was offered and accepted what was seen as the more suitable post of Bishop of Birmingham.

Between 1908 and 1914, he was the sole Church of England representative on the Executive Committee of the National Service League. Wakefield was a strong supporter of British participation in the First World War. He wrote 'I am quite certain that Germany regards England as her greatest competitor, and if she is at war with her she will wish to inflict upon her the severest defeat possible .... but I feel honestly that on this occasion England goes into battle with clean hands and noble motives'. One of Wakefield's own sons was in the Royal Navy, in command of HMS Lysander in 1914, and both his other sons served in the military including Gilbert who was wounded on the Western Front and later became a playwright. Henry Russell Wakefield was active in recruitment to the forces, notable at a large Town Hall gathering in 1914, and in 1918 was still pressing clergy to volunteer as chaplains. 'I am, frankly, not over-pleased if I find a parish still thoroughly well-staffed with youngish men. I dislike intensely exercising episcopal pressure in these matters; the persuasion of a tender conscience and of a true patriotism should be more than enough.'

During the War, Wakefield once controversially referred to British Roman Catholics as "guests of the nation". This earned him a rebuke from the Roman Catholic Bishop of Clifton, George Burton. Wakefield's Roman Catholic counterpart at Birmingham at the time was Edward Ilsley, under whose metropolitan jurisdiction Clifton Diocese fell.

In October 1918, Wakefield went to Canada, travelling some 18,000 miles explaining the moral issues behind the War. For this, he was awarded the CBE.

Wakefield was described in his Times obituary in January 1933 as a "layman's bishop."

His second son was the author H. Russell Wakefield.

Church of England titles
Preceded by William Lefroy	Dean of Norwich; 1909–1911	Succeeded by Henry Charles Beeching
Preceded by Charles Gore	Bishop of Birmingham; 1911–1924	Succeeded by Ernest William Barnes
