= Diocese of Clifton =

Latin Catholic ecclesiastical jurisdiction in England

Diocese of Clifton Diœcesis Cliftoniensis

Catholic
- Symbol of the Diocese of Clifton

- Coat of arms

Location
- Country: England
- Territory: Gloucestershire; Somerset; Wiltshire
- Episcopal conference: Catholic Bishops' Conference of England and Wales
- Ecclesiastical province: Province of Birmingham
- Metropolitan: Archbishop of Birmingham
- Coordinates: 51.456°N 2.616°W

Statistics
- Area: 10,916 km^{2} (4,215 sq mi)
- Population: Total; Catholics: (as of 2021); 2,664,300 (Note: Annuario Pontificio (2022) via Catholic-Hierarchy.org); 173,000 (6.5%)
- Parishes: 104

Information
- Denomination: Catholic
- Sui iuris church: Latin Church
- Rite: Roman Rite
- Established: 29 September 1850
- Cathedral: Cathedral Church of SS. Peter and Paul, Clifton
- Secular priests: 83, plus 33 religious priests

Current leadership
- Pope: Leo XIV
- Bishop: Bosco MacDonald
- Metropolitan Archbishop: Bernard Longley
- Vicar General: Liam Slattery
- Episcopal Vicars: Richard Dwyer
- Bishops emeritus: Declan Lang

Map
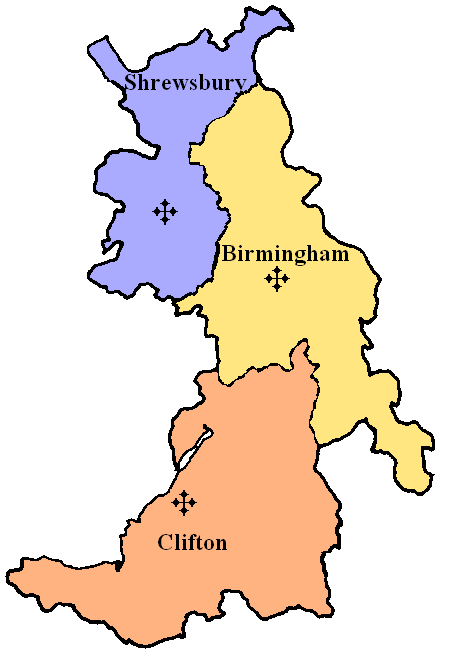
- Diocese of Clifton within the Province of Birmingham

Website
- cliftondiocese.com

The Diocese of Clifton is a Latin Church diocese of the Catholic Church centred at the Cathedral Church of Saints Peter and Paul in Clifton, England.

The diocese covers the historic counties of the West of England and includes the City and County of Bristol, the counties of Gloucestershire, Somerset, Wiltshire, North Somerset, South Gloucestershire and Bath and North East Somerset

== Diocese of Clifton ==
Clifton Diocese covers the West of England and includes the City and County of Bristol, the counties of Gloucestershire, Somerset, Wiltshire, North Somerset, South Gloucestershire and Bath and North East Somerset Cities and towns include Bath, Wells, Cheltenham, Gloucester, Salisbury, Taunton, Shepton Mallet and Weston-super-Mare.

The Clifton Diocese makes up part of the Catholic Association Pilgrimage.

The diocese was erected in 1850; from then until 1911 it was in the ecclesiastical province of Westminster, and has been in the province of Birmingham since then.

== Statistics ==
The Diocese has 104 Parishes, or the equivalent. Many have chapels-of-ease or other Mass centres, adding a total of 99 chapels. The parishes are run by a mixture of Diocesan priests, and priests who belong to Religious Orders such as the Benedictines, Franciscans and others.

== Diocesan boundaries ==
In 2023, the diocese's 13 deaneries (originally six) were replaced by 9 pastoral areas, each led by a dean and named after a saint associated with the diocese. These pastoral areas comprise the following parishes:

- St Edmund of Abingdon Bishopston; Bristol City Centre; Downend; Easton; Filton; Fishponds; Henbury; Kingswood; Chipping Sodbury; Lawrence Weston; Patchway; Redfield; Shirehampton; Southmead; Westbury-on-Trym; Yate.
- St Alexander Briant Chew Magna; Clevedon; Keynsham; Knowle; Knowle West; Nailsea; Portishead; Whitchurch; Withywood.
- St Kenelm Charlton Kings; Cheltenham St Gregory; Cheltenham St Thomas More; Chipping Campden; Cirencester; Fairford; Kemerton; Stow-on-the-Wold; Tewkesbury; Winchcombe.
- St Wulstan Brockworth; Churchdown; Cinderford; Coleford; Dursley; Gloucester; Matson; Newent; Nympsfield; Stonehouse; Stroud; Thornbury; Tuffley; Woodchester; Wotton-under-Edge.
- St Aldhelm Devizes; Malmesbury; Tetbury; Marlborough; Royal Wootton Bassett; Swindon Holy Family; Swindon Holy Rood; Swindon St Mary; Swindon St Peter; Wroughton.
- St Oliver Plunkett Bath Our Lady and St Alphege; Bath St John; Bath St Mary; Combe Down; Bradford-on-Avon; Calne; Chippenham; Corsham; Frome; Melksham; Peasedown St John; Stratton-on-the-Fosse; Trowbridge.
- Blessed Richard Whiting Chard; Cheddar; Glastonbury; Shepton Mallet; Somerton; Wells; Wincanton; Yeovil.
- St Edith of Wilton Amesbury; Salisbury; Tisbury; Warminster.
- St Dunstan Bridgwater; Burnham-on-Sea; Dulverton; Minehead; Taunton St George; Taunton St Teresa of Lisieux; Wellington; Weston-super-Mare Corpus Christi; Weston-super-Mare Our Lady of Lourdes; Weston-super-Mare St Joseph.

== History ==
The English Reformation suppressed the Catholic hierarchy in England by the mid-16th century. In 1622 the Sacred Congregation for the Propagation of the Faith created an apostolic vicariate for the whole of England, which was divided into four districts in 1688. The Western District, comprising the whole of Wales and the present Dioceses of Plymouth and Clifton, was by far the poorest. The hierarchy was restored in 1850 by Pope Pius IX, and the Western District was created the Diocese of Clifton, so-called because the Ecclesiastical Titles Act 1851 (repealed 20 years later by the Ecclesiastical Titles Act 1871) made it illegal for Catholic dioceses to use the same title as current or former Anglican dioceses, despite the fact that the Diocese of Clifton had its Cathedral Church within the City of Bristol. The apostolic vicar William Joseph Hendren was appointed as the first bishop.

In 1830, in an attempt to ensure a supply of priests for the district, Bishop Peter Baines, the Vicar-Apostolic, had bought the Prior Park estate near Bath and had established there a school and a seminary, now Prior Park College. Although an academic success the college was a financial disaster. Bishop Hendren resigned in 1851 realising his inability to do anything about the huge debts on the college. His successor, Bishop Thomas Burgess, died in 1854 without doing anything to solve the problem.

A Decree of the Sacred College promulgated on 22 December 1855 prevented the appointment of a new Bishop of Clifton until the problems of the college had been solved. Instead, an administrator was appointed who would manage the affairs of the diocese until a bishop was appointed. He was Archbishop Errington, Co-Adjutor to Cardinal Wiseman the Archbishop of Westminster. He arrived at Prior Park at the end of October 1855, but was not able to do anything to preserve the college. A Court Order was enforced against the college for non-payment of rent, and the contents of the college were sold by auction, and the premises vacated.

The problem of Prior Park having been settled, a new Bishop of Clifton was appointed. William Clifford, the second son of Lord Clifford of Chudleigh in Devon, was consecrated by Pope Pius IX on 15 February 1857, and enthroned at the pro-cathedral on 17 March 1857. For the next 36 years he guided the diocese to prosperity.

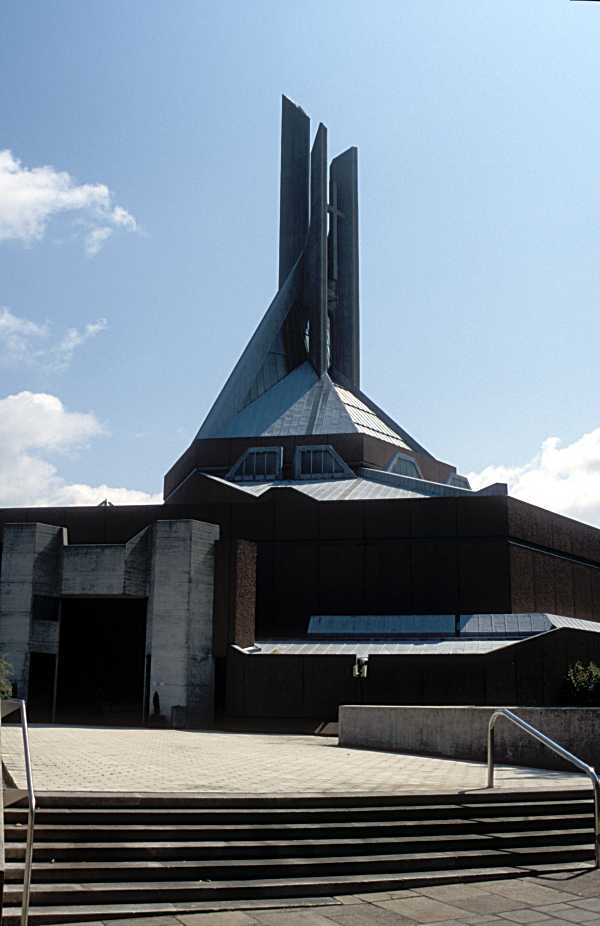
Clifton Cathedral

The pro-cathedral had an unfortunate history. Work on the building started in 1834 but ceased the following year when the foundations failed. The half-finished building was abandoned in 1843 when a second attempt to reinforce the foundations again failed. Bishop William Ullathorne, Vicar-Apostolic from 1846 to 1848, had a roof placed on the half-finished building so that it could be used as a church, but Bishop Clifford, with the advice of the architect Charles Hansom, had it converted into a reasonable pro-cathedral. He also re-purchased Prior Park and re-opened the school and the seminary, much of the expense being found by the bishop's family. Bishop Clifford died in 1893. His successor, Bishop William Brownlow, was consecrated in 1894 and died in 1901.

Brownlow's successor, Bishop George Ambrose Burton, a priest of the Diocese of Hexham and Newcastle, was Bishop of Clifton for the next 29 years. An outstanding scholar, he was an authority on ancient manuscripts and catalogued the documents which now form the basis of the Diocesan Archives. He saw the magnificent Benedictine Downside Abbey completed, and he welcomed a second Benedictine community when the convert community from Caldey Island came to the diocese to settle at Prinknash Abbey.

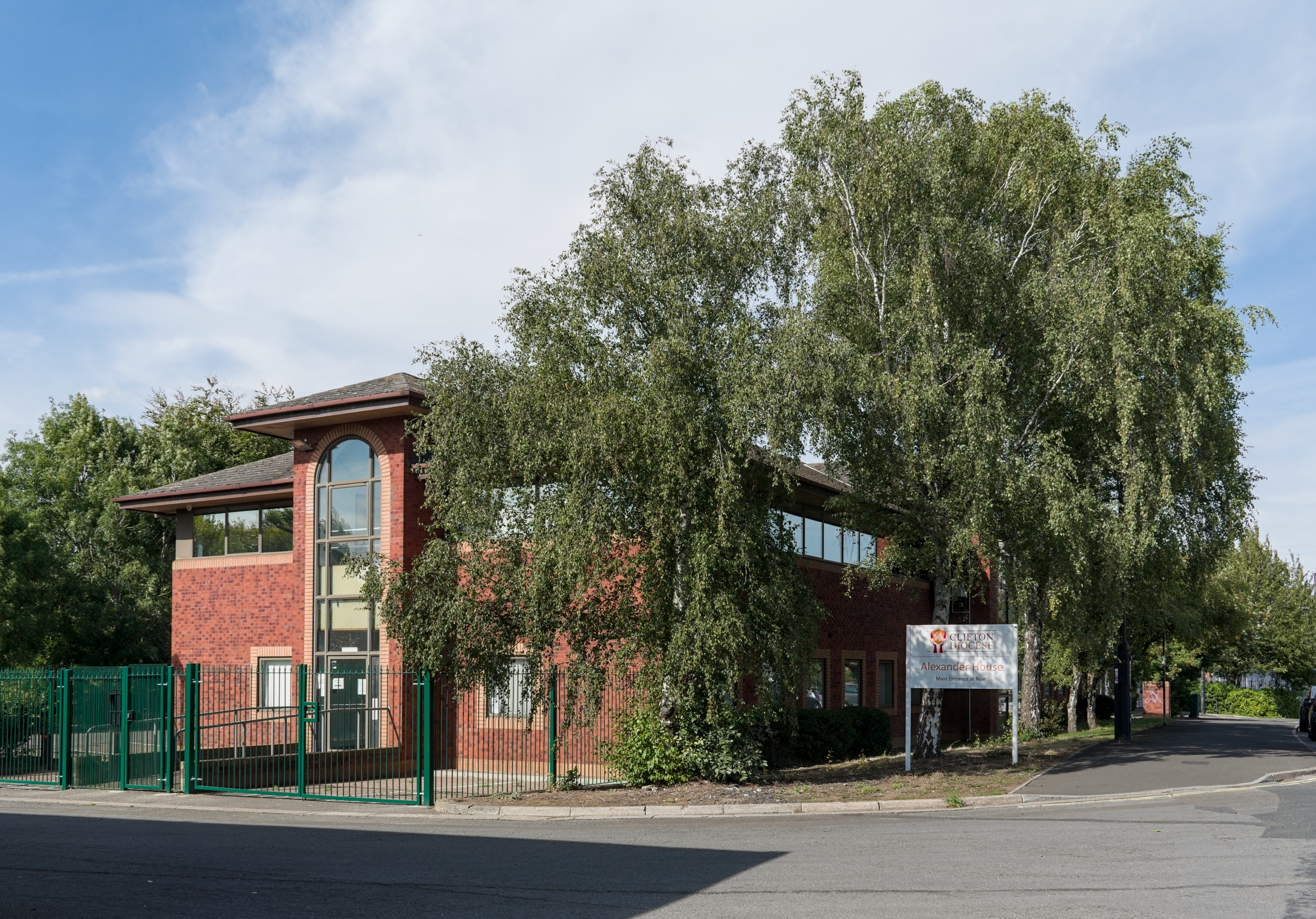
Alexander House on Pennywell Road in Easton, Bristol, which serves as the Curia offices of the diocese

Bishop William Lee, who had been secretary to Bishop Burton, succeeded him in 1931. During his 16 years as bishop, he founded 72 new parishes and Mass Centres. His successor, Bishop Joseph Rudderham, a priest of the Diocese of Northampton, was consecrated at Clifton on 26 July 1949. The financial demands made on the people of the diocese to provide new schools to comply with the provisions of the Education Act 1944 resulted in expenditure of £332,000 between 1949 and 1960. In spite of these demands, the building of a new cathedral was undertaken in 1968. On the Feast of Saints Peter and Paul, 1973, in the presence of a vast gathering of religious and civic dignitaries, Bishop Rudderham took possession of the current Clifton Cathedral.

Bishop Rudderham resigned his See in August 1974 and died in retirement in February 1979. His auxiliary bishop, Bishop Mervyn Alexander was appointed eighth Bishop of Clifton in December 1974 and guided the diocese for the next 27 years. He then retired to Weston-super-Mare as parish priest at St Joseph's. In March 2001, Bishop Declan Lang was ordained as the ninth Bishop of Clifton.

== Bishops ==
=== Bishop ===
Bishop John Bosco MacDonald, known as Bosco. Pope Francis appointed him the Tenth Bishop of Clifton on 14 March 2024. Bishop Bosco's Episcopal Ordination was on 8 May 2024 in Clifton Cathedral, Bristol.

=== Ordinaries ===
The ninth bishop was the Right Reverend Declan Lang, who was born on 15 April 1950 in Cowes, Isle of Wight. Ordained in 1975, he was a priest in the Diocese of Portsmouth, serving as vicar general from 1996. He was appointed the ninth Bishop of Clifton by Pope John Paul II on 27 February 2001. His resignation was confirmed by Pope Francis on 14 March 2024 on which date his successor as the tenth Bishop of Clifton was also confirmed as Bosco MacDonald.

==== Vicars Apostolic of Western District ====
- Michael Ellis, O.S.B. (1688–1705); later appointed Bishop of Segni, Italy
- Andrew Giffard (1705); did not take effect
- Matthew Pritchard, O.F.M. Rec. (1713–1750)
- Laurence York, O.S.B. (1750–1763)
- Charles Walmesley, O.S.B. (1763–1797)
- William Gregory Sharrock, O.S.B. (1797–1809)
- Peter Bernardine Collingridge, O.F.M. Rec. (1809–1829)
- Peter Augustine Baines, O.S.B. (1829–1843)
- Charles Michael Baggs (1844–1845)
- William Bernard Ullathorne, O.S.B. (1846–1848), appointed Vicar Apostolic of Central District
- Joseph William Hendren, O.F.M. Rec. (1848–1850); see below

==== Bishops of Clifton ====
See also Bishop of Clifton.

- Joseph William Hendren, O.F.M. Rec. (1850–1851), appointed Bishop of Nottingham; see above
- Thomas Lawrence Burgess, O.S.B. (1851–1854)
- William Joseph Hugh Clifford (1857–1893)
- William Robert Bernard Brownlow (1894–1901)
- George Crompton Ambrose Burton (1902–1931)
- William Lee (1931–1948)
- Joseph Edward Rudderham (1949–1974)
- Mervyn Alban Alexander (1974–2001)
- Declan Ronan Lang (2001–2024)
- Bosco MacDonald (2024–)

=== Coadjutor Vicars Apostolic ===
- Peter Augustine Baines, O.S.B. (1823–1829)
- Peter Bernardine Collingridge, O.F.M. Rec. (1807–1809)
- Charles Francis McDonnel, O.F.M. Rec. (1816), did not take effect
- James Jerome Sharrock, O.S.B. (1806), did not take effect
- William Gregory Sharrock, O.S.B. (1779–1797)
- Charles Walmesley, O.S.B. (1756–1763)
- Laurence York, O.S.B. (1741–1750)

=== Auxiliary bishop ===
- Mervyn Alban Alexander (1972–1974), appointed Bishop here

=== Other priests of this diocese who became bishops ===
- Francis Edward Joseph Grimshaw, appointed Bishop of Plymouth in 1947
- Roger Francis Crispian Hollis, appointed auxiliary bishop of Birmingham in 1987
- Michael Joseph Lawrence McGrath, appointed Bishop of Menevia, Wales in 1935
- William Vaughan, appointed Bishop of Plymouth in 1855

== See also ==
- Catholic Church in England and Wales
- Catholic Church in the United Kingdom
- List of Catholic dioceses in Great Britain
- List of Catholic dioceses in the United Kingdom
- List of Catholic dioceses (alphabetical) (including archdioceses)
- List of Catholic dioceses (structured view) (including archdioceses)
- List of Catholic churches in the United Kingdom
