= Pro-Cathedral of the Holy Apostles =

Pro-cathedral in City of Bristol, UK

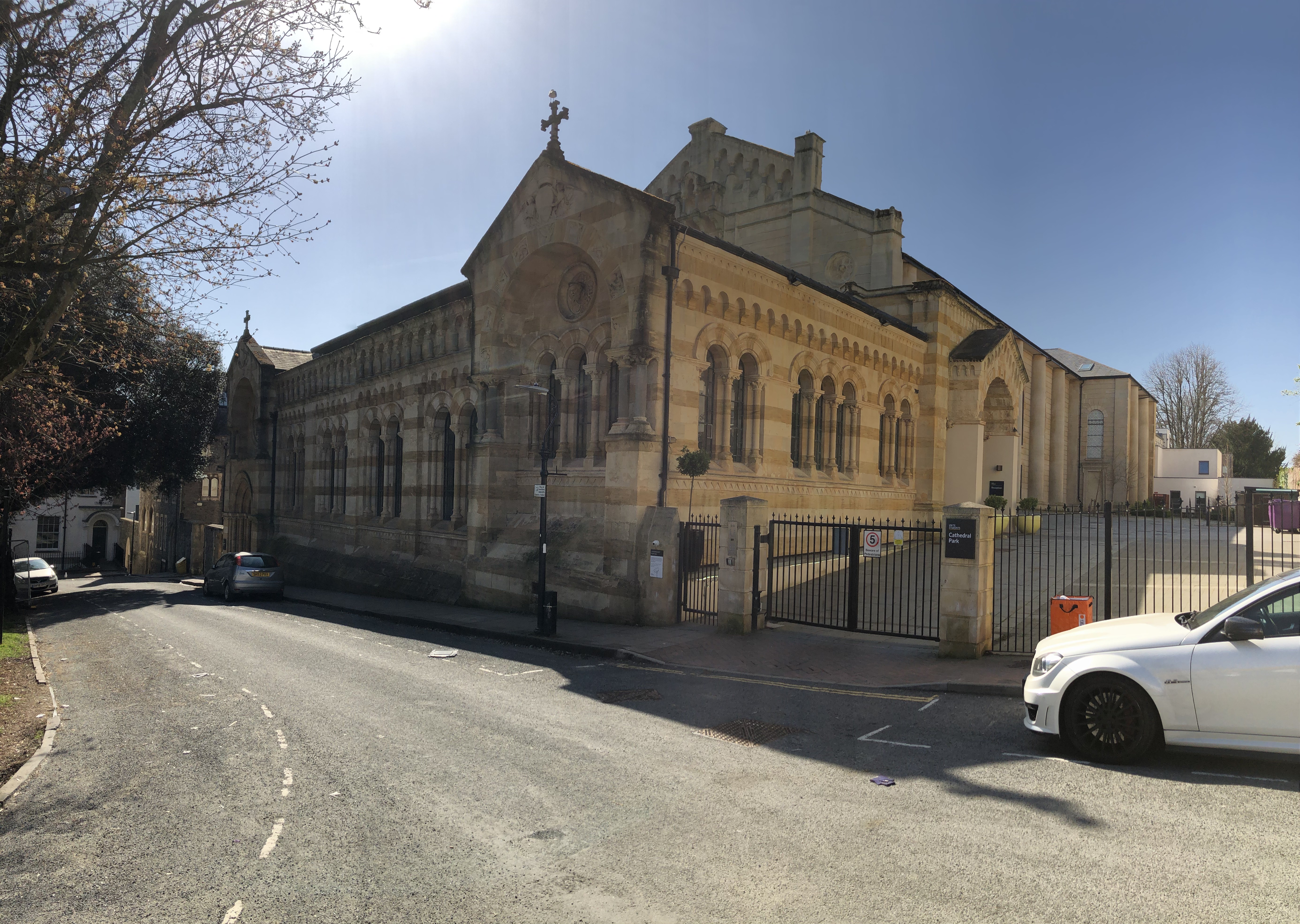
- Pro Cathedral of the Holy Apostles, front

- Location within Bristol

Religion
- Affiliation: Roman Catholic
- Ecclesiastical or organizational status: Cathedral
- Year consecrated: 1850

Location
- Location: Bristol, England
- Interactive map of Pro-Cathedral of the Holy Apostles
- Coordinates: 51.4563°N 2.6098°W

Architecture
- Architects: Henry Goodridge; Charles Francis Hansom
- Type: Ecclesiastical
- Style: Palladian
- Completed: 1850

The Pro-Cathedral of the Holy Apostles was the Roman Catholic cathedral in the city of Bristol, England from 1850 to 1973. The Pro-Cathedral was replaced in 1973 by the Cathedral Church of SS. Peter and Paul, also known as Clifton Cathedral. It is a Grade II Listed Building.

== Early Catholicism in Bristol ==
Prior to the Roman Catholic Relief Act 1791 (31 Geo. 3. c. 32), Roman Catholics suffered from religious discrimination and were not allowed to hold public office. Whilst no longer an act of high treason punishable by hanging, drawing and quartering, being a Catholic priest was then liable to life imprisonment. General prejudice ran deep: in the anti-Catholic Gordon Riots of 1780, an estimated 1,000 people died.

== History ==
By Catholic emancipation, and the Roman Catholic Relief Act 1829, the Roman Catholics in Bristol used places of worship in private houses or above a Public house. They had used a third party to discretely buy a plot, known as Stoney Fields, on Honeypen Hill (now Park Place, Clifton).

=== The Palladian building ===
Under Bishop Peter Augustine Baines, Vicar-Apostolic of the Western District, in 1834, work commenced on the building. The parish priest of the Trenchard Street Chapel, Fr. Edgeworth laid the foundation stone. The Georgian Palladian design was by Henry E. Goodridge, a Bath architect employed by Bishop Baines at Prior Park.

A nave, on an imposing basement storey in Bath stone ashlar was to be surrounded by Corinthian three-quarter Columns, with further Corinthian columns on the Transepts. No drawings survive of the planned sanctuary end or interior, but a circular lantern tower surrounded by Corinthian columns was to light the sanctuary from above and the main entrance was through a Corinthian portico.

=== Problems with the site ===
The weight of the rising structure, on what was a challenging hillside site, caused the foundations to repeatedly give way. This was a similar problem to that faced by Isambard Kingdom Brunel at Clifton Suspension Bridge at around the same time. A second attempt to reinforce the foundations was made in 1843. Faced with financial difficulties (for which as Parish priest he was personally responsible), Fr. Edgeworth fled to Antwerp, bankrupt, where he died in 1850. Bishop Baines was encumbered with the restoration of Prior Park after a fire in 1836, and was unable to assist. The ruined building and land was repossessed by the Newport Bank. The building lay abandoned until 1848, although mass was celebrated in the chapel of St Augustine, lower down the hill, from 1842.

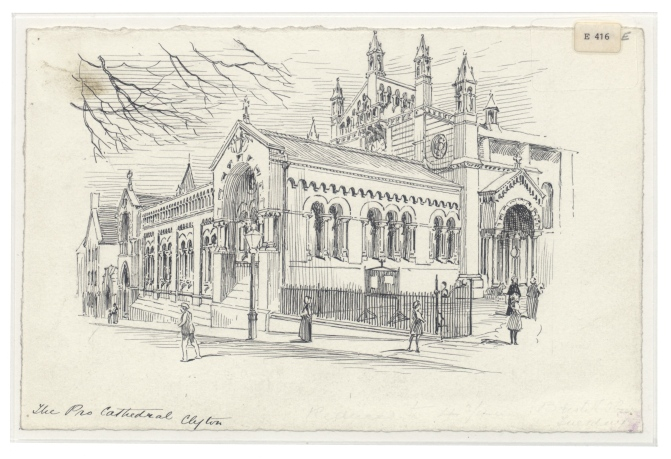
Samuel Loxton, ProCathedral exterior, 1914, Ink Drawing for Bristol Evening Post, Bristol, Bristol Libraries E416, Bristol Archives

=== Roofing the building ===
With the Protestant Reformation the Catholic hierarchy had been abolished, and the Church in Rome regulated religious life in England and Wales. The Vatican department of Propaganda Fide appointed Vicars Apostolic (ordained bishops but without the title of bishop) until the restoration of the hierarchy in 1850. In 1846 Bishop William Ullathorne was appointed to the apostolic vicariate of the Western District.

Bishop William Ullathorne (Vicar Apostolic of the Western District, 1846–1848) wrote in 1868:

‘My earnest desire was to build a new church in Bristol which might serve as a cathedral…which might serve as a centre for the district. Messrs. Vaughan and Estcourt searched in all directions for a site for the purpose, but all in vain. Mr Vaughan then suggested the consideration of repurchasing the ruin of the great church begun by Father Edgworth at Clifton…a useless ruin for many years, and a disgrace to the Catholic body. It consisted of…the present church standing without any side windows up to within two feet of their present height, and a colonnade of six huge columns raised to half their height in front… It was the opinion of architects and builders that the ruin could not have been roofed, the span being so large, and the walls so thin for carrying the requisite beams… As it stood, except for two windows at the entrance end, it was altogether blind and dark.'

Charles Hansom was a Roman Catholic from Yorkshire. He was the architect later employed on the nearby Clifton College in the 1860s, and was brother to Joseph Hansom the ‘cab maker’. Charles had a house at Arlington Villas in Wetherell Place just around the corner from where Bishop Ullathorne lived at 22 Meridian Place. Bishop Ullathorne continues:

'I sent for Mr. Hansom; told him he must put his architectural reputation into his pocket, and simply follow my directions… I directed him to raise the walls round to a level for about two feet above their actual height, and then to put in two rows of columns, not of stone, for they would have to come on the crown of the crypt vaultings, but of wood, to be made stouter to the eye by casings. As for their foundation, I said, here is none, and we must run two beams the whole length upon the crown of the vaulting, like the keels of two ships, joint the separate pieces together upon the supporting sub-walls, mortice them into the end walls, and then step the wooden pillars upon them. Having raised these pillars, cased them and expanded the tops into capitals at the height of the walls, we next raised wooden semi-circular arches above them, so as to receive an open roof. This will give us the requisite height and enable the building to carry a roof. We thus succeeded at a small cost in converting the ruin into the present cathedral of Clifton.'

This 'ingenious, comparatively lightly aisled structure of timber uprights and arches supported a timber roof', was compared to an upturned boat, familiar to Ullathorne from his naval childhood.

The church was opened by Bishop Ullathorne on 21 September 1848. In 1850, Clifton was made an episcopal see and the church became the Pro-Cathedral, intended to act in this capacity until a more fitting cathedral church could be constructed. Bishop Joseph Hendren became the first Bishop of Clifton (the ceremonial counties of Gloucestershire, Wiltshire and Somerset and Bristol), and Ullathorne was made Bishop of Birmingham, and later Archbishop of Birmingham.

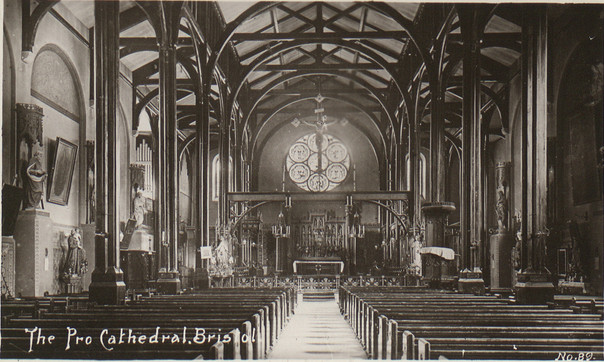
Postcard, ProCathedral interior, undated (probably early 20th cent.), from the Roy Vaughan Collections, BRO43207/29/19/10, Bristol Archives

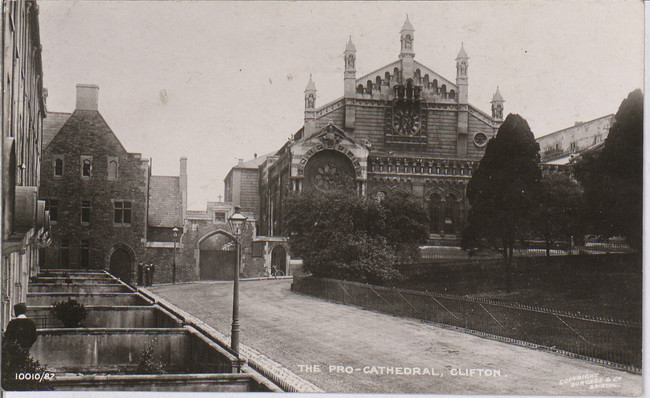
Postcard, ProCathedral, 9 February 1912, Roy Vaughan Collection, BRO43207/29/19/9, Bristol Archives

In the ProCathedral Church there were twelve larger-than-life statues of the Apostles standing atop the plinths covering and disguising the original stone columns of the failed building. In addition, there were two or three statues of the Virgin Mary, a statue of the Sacred Heart, and a multiplicity of other statues of other saints including St John the Baptist, St Therese of Lisieux, St Anthony of Padua and St Rock. By the rear door, there was a statue of the Apostle St Peter, his extended foot rubbed smooth by the repeated touching of the faithful as they entered and left the building.

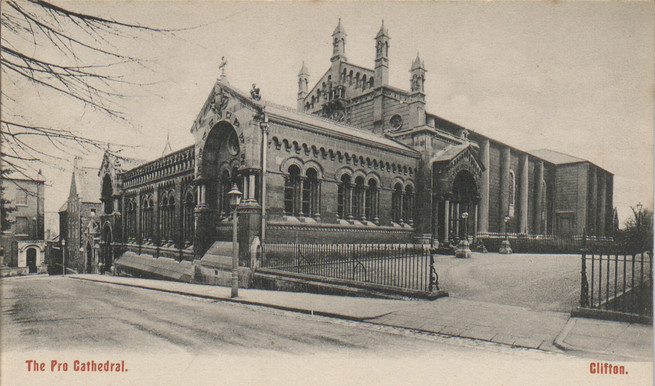
Postcard, ProCathedral exterior, undated (probably early 20th cent.), Roy Vaughan Collection, BRO43207/29/19/6, Bristol Archives

In the 1870s Bishop William Clifford started to replace the unfinished portico, with a schoolroom. The whole entrance and exterior, including the school, atrium and porch, and pinnacled façade, were remodelled, by Charles Hansom (who still lived locally) in a North Italian Romanesque style in Pennant rubble stone. The first part of the scheme was completed by 1876, but the exterior re-styling, a tall tower with Octagonal lantern and short spire (totalling 61m or 200 ft), were not completed. The nave and choir remained unaltered, though round-topped windows were added in the 1870s and in 1903 to increase light in the nave, with 'rich Renaissance canopies' by Hardmans of Birmingham.

=== Later history ===
During the Second World War, part of the crypt was remodelled with blast walls to form an air raid shelter. There was some bomb damage to the slate roof from shrapnel, but no structural damage during the Bristol Blitz.

==== A new Cathedral ====
From the 1930s to 1950s the ProCathedral parishioners and clergy had raised £250,000 (1967) for the decoration and restoration of the ProCathedral. In 1964, civil engineers reported that they could not recommend the integrity of the ground on which the ProCathedral stood. This caused a serious problem for the Bishop of Clifton, Dr Joseph Rudderham and Monsignor Thomas Hughes, the parish priest: whether to restore the old building or rebuild elsewhere. In 1965 architects were commissioned to undertake the design of a new cathedral on a different site in Clifton. In 1967 the construction of a multi-storey car park on the former quarry below the site caused cracks to appear in the masonry of the ProCathedral. There were serious concerns that a foundation collapse might occur. However, expensive remedial works by the car park contractor temporarily stabilised the foundations.

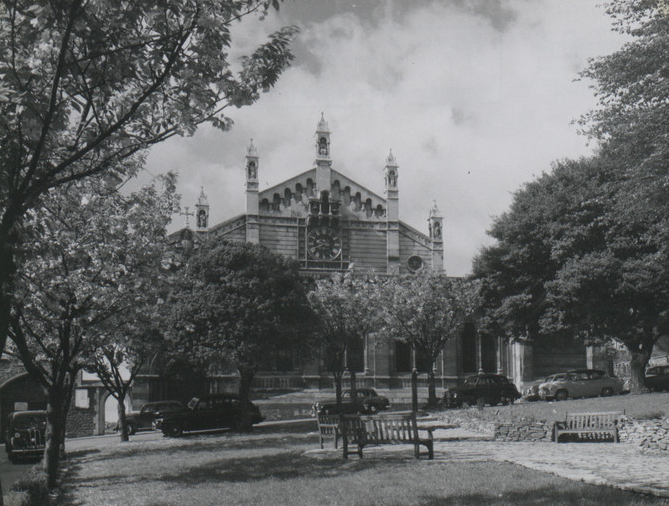
ProCathedral, 1950s, a Bristol Public Relations Photograph, BRO40826/CHU/21, Bristol Archives

By late 1967 the decision had been made to purchase a site elsewhere and to build a church there, without much formal consultation with the parishioners. An anonymous group of business people contributed £450,000 (1967) on the strict condition that a new site was found and a new building was constructed. The donors had 'a vision of a place of worship and a monument to Almighty God'

The new Cathedral was begun at a site on Clifton Park, in March 1970 and was consecrated on the Patronal feast of Saints Peter and Paul, 29 June 1973. The ProCathedral was closed. The ProCathedral parish priest, Rt Rev Mgr Thomas J Hughes (Protonotary apostolic and Vicar general), transferred to the new Cathedral parish, serving Clifton, Redland and Hotwells.

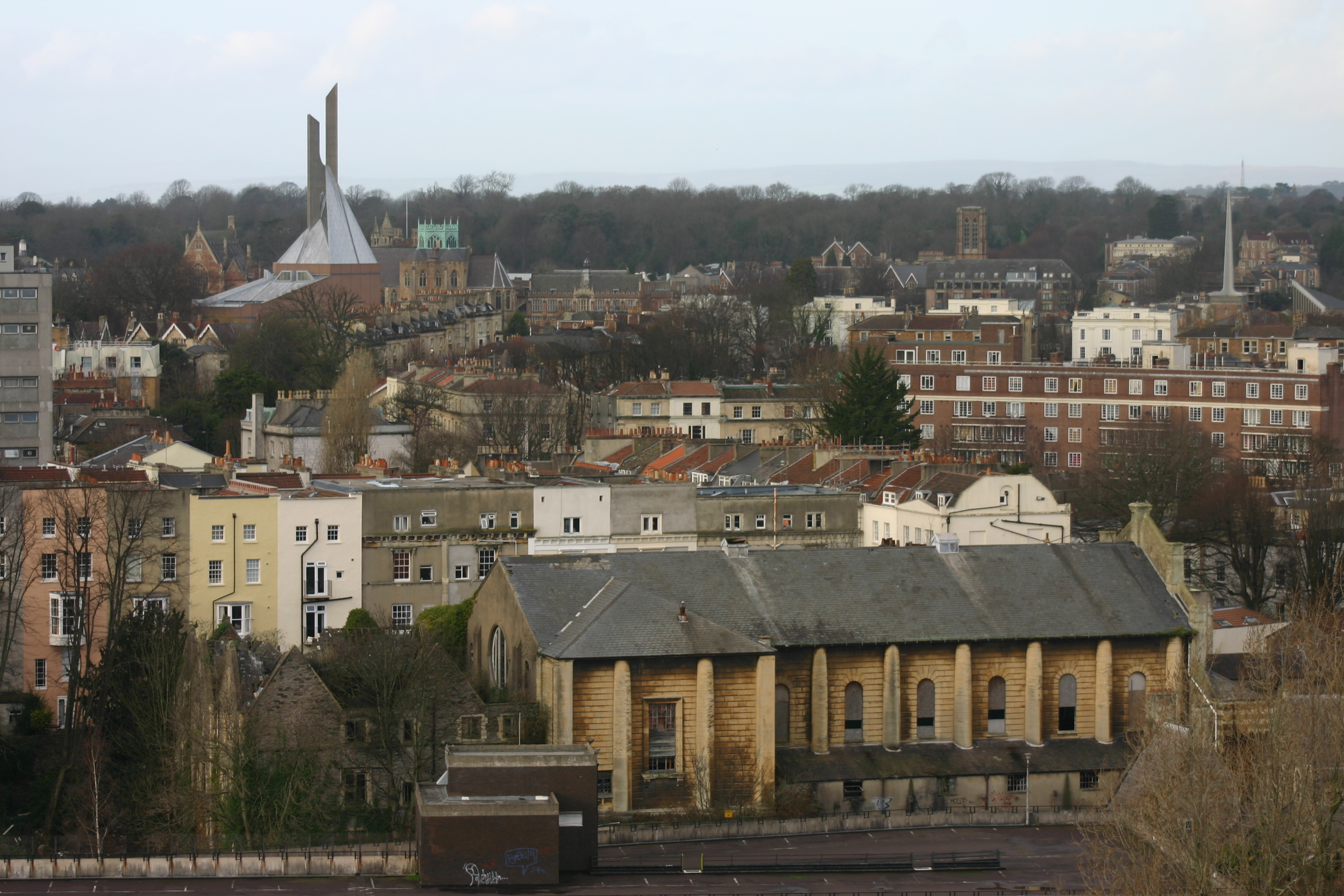
The Pro-Cathedral in the foreground with the replacement Clifton Cathedral visible at upper rear left

The Bishop's chair or Cathedra ‘a late nineteenth century carved oak Bishops’ elbow chair with Grecian key patterns, upholstered in American cloth’ was auctioned off, along with many redundant ecclesiastical furnishings. The removal of the Victorian organ (made up of three other organs of varying vintage and in poor condition) would have required £25,000 (1973), so a new Rieger organ was commissioned.

Very little was transferred from the ProCathedral to the new Cathedral, mostly for aesthetic reasons:

- Two bronze Bells, originally manufactured by John Taylor & Co in 1901 (tuned to F and C with diameter 1’10" and 2’5½", weights 1-3-26 and 4-2-26), and
- A sixteenth or seventeenth century carving in ivory of the figure of Jesus crucified, which was re-mounted on an ash wood cross-shaped pole for the Processional cross. During the 1990s, this artistic treasure was dropped and shattered. Although restored, it has now retired to the wall of the Blessed Sacrament Chapel.

==== Disposal of the ProCathedral Site ====
The diocese sold the site to a German charity – Steiner Waldorf Schools Fellowship – and the proceeds were used for the replacement for the ProCathedral Primary School, SS. Peter & Paul, constructed in Aberdeen Road, Redland, and opened in 1974. The cathedral and site became the home of a Steiner school until 2002, when it was sold for redevelopment.

During 2007 the space was run as a theatre and art venue by The Invisible Circus and Artspace Lifespace. Following this, the building fell into extensive disrepair.

==== A new future ====
In May 2011, the site was purchased by Student Castle – a student accommodation provider – which undertook extensive works to refurbish and re-purpose both the Pro-cathedral building and the adjacent 'Upper School' building into student flats. The buildings were then sold to Liberty Living, another student accommodation provider who ran the site until 2020 when Liberty Living was purchased by Unite Students, another provider of student accommodation. The site currently holds 263 student beds.

== In popular culture ==
In 1985, the building was used for some of the filming of the third series of ITV's Robin of Sherwood.
