= George Burton (bishop) =

English prelate

George Crompton Ambrose Burton
- Bishop of Clifton
- Church: Catholic Church
- Diocese: Diocese of Clifton
- In office: 15 March 1902 – 8 February 1931
- Predecessor: William Brownlow
- Successor: William Lee

Orders
- Ordination: 31 May 1890 by Lucido Parocchi
- Consecration: 1 May 1902 by Arthur Riddell

Personal details
- Born: 7 June 1852 Kingston upon Hull, East Riding of Yorkshire, United Kingdom of Great Britain and Ireland
- Died: 8 February 1931 (aged 78) Leigh Woods, Somerset, United Kingdom

George Crompton Ambrose Burton (7 June 1852 – 8 February 1931) was an English prelate of the Roman Catholic Church. He served as Bishop of Clifton from 1902 to 1931.

Born in Kingston upon Hull on 28 April 1856, he was ordained to the priesthood on 31 May 1890. He was appointed the Bishop of the Diocese of Clifton by the Holy See on 15 March 1902. His consecration to the episcopate took place on 1 May 1902 at the pro-Cathedral in Clifton, the principal consecrator was Arthur George Riddell, Bishop of Northampton, and the principal co-consecrators were Thomas Whiteside, Bishop (later Archbishop) of Liverpool and Richard Preston, Auxiliary Bishop of Hexham and Newcastle.

He served as Bishop of Clifton during the Great War, during which he consecrated the Woodchester wayside cross (thought to be the first Great War memorial in the country) and condemned the Anglican Bishop of Birmingham Henry Wakefield for anti-Catholic bigotry, after he referred to British Roman Catholics as "guests of the nation".

Burton died in office on 8 February 1931, aged 74.

Catholic Church titles
| Preceded by William Robert Brownlow | Bishop of Clifton; 1902–1931 | Succeeded by William Lee |
