= Vicar Apostolic of the Western District =

The Vicar Apostolic of the Western District may refer to:

- Vicar Apostolic of the Western District (England), a precursor title of the Roman Catholic Bishop of Clifton.
- Vicar Apostolic of the Western District (Scotland), a precursor title of the restored Roman Catholic Archbishop of Glasgow.
