= William Clifford (bishop) =

English prelate

William Hugh Joseph Clifford
- Bishop of Clifton
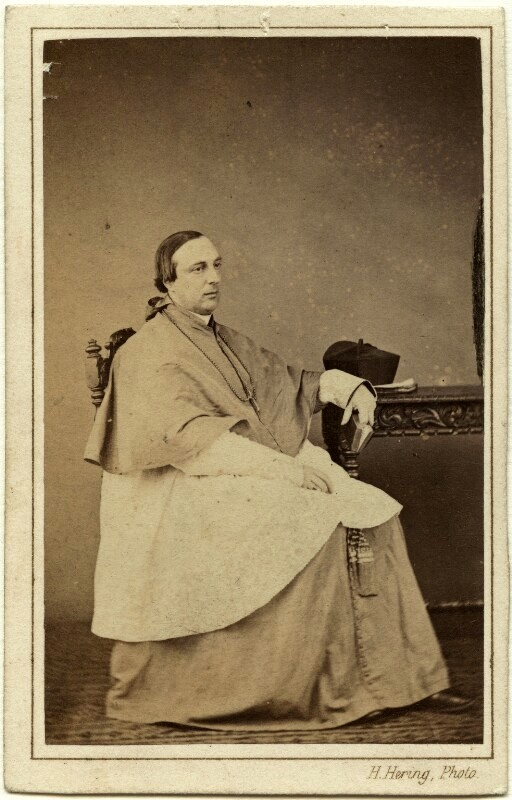
- Church: Catholic Church
- Diocese: Diocese of Clifton
- In office: 6 February 1857 – 14 August 1893
- Predecessor: Thomas Burgess
- Successor: William Brownlow

Orders
- Ordination: 25 August 1850 by Joseph William Hendren
- Consecration: 15 February 1857 by Pope Pius IX

Personal details
- Born: 24 December 1823 Irnham, Lincolnshire, United Kingdom of Great Britain and Ireland
- Died: 14 August 1893 (aged 69)

William Hugh Joseph Clifford (24 December 1823 – 14 August 1893) was an English prelate of the Roman Catholic Church. He served as Bishop of Clifton from 1857 to 1893.

== Life ==
He was born in Irnham, Lincolnshire on 24 December 1823, the son of Hugh Clifford, 7th Baron Clifford of Chudleigh and Mary Lucy Weld, daughter of Cardinal Thomas Weld. He had schooling at Hodder Place, and attended Prior Park College, run by Augustine Baines. He then went to the Accademia dei Nobili Ecclesiastici in Rome.

=== Priest ===
Clifford was ordained to the priesthood on 25 August 1850, at the Pro-Cathedral of the Holy Apostles, by Joseph William Hendren. He became curate to William Vaughan there, and then moved on as vicar capitular in the new Diocese of Plymouth. In 1851 he traveled to Rome with Herbert Vaughan and William Maskell. From 1852 Clifford was also head of the mission at Stonehouse, Plymouth.

=== Bishop ===
On 29 January 1857 Clifford was appointed the Bishop of the Diocese of Clifton. His consecration to the Episcopate took place at the Sistine Chapel on 15 February 1857. The principal consecrator was Pope Pius IX, with George Errington as co-consecrator.

When Nicholas Wiseman died in 1865, a prevailing view was that Clifford should succeed him as Archbishop of Westminster. Liberal Catholics were pleased with his response at that time to the Syllabus of Errors. Robert Aston Coffin briefed in a papal audience with Pius IX against this choice as "less than worthy". The formal process involved the Westminster Chapter submitting a terna (list of three candidates, alphabetical, as suggestions with no binding effect) to the Pope. As the Chapter met, it was told by John Morris of advice from Rome not to nominate George Errington; Errington had clashed with Wiseman in the later 1850s, causing Wiseman to ask for his removal from office, and had been in retirement from 1860. In the event, the Chapter nominated Clifford, Errington and Thomas Grant. Further, Clifford and Grant wrote to say that they did not wish to be considered. Lord Palmerston conveyed through Odo Russell the British government's view that Grant was the best candidate.

The Pope took these proceedings very badly. In a letter to George Talbot in Rome, Henry Edward Manning explained his objections to Errington, and to Clifford, saying of the latter "We should be overrun with worldly Catholics and a worldly policy without his meaning or knowing it." In the end Manning became the new Archbishop.

In 1866 Clifford bought the Prior Park College premises, sold during the 1850s, which again became a Catholic school.

=== Vatican I ===
Clifford attended the First Vatican Council held from 8 December 1869 to 20 October 1870. He was there as one of the 693 council fathers. The standard Catholic history of the Council by Cuthbert Butler is now taken to be unfair in its account of Clifford's part. He made his views known on clerical discipline, and a catechism. He spoke against papal infallibility as the Council would define it.

=== Later life ===
In the run-up to the apostolic constitution of 1881, Romanos Pontifices, Clifford played a major role, from around 1877. He drafted a document in canon law terms, with William Ullathorne, addressing the relationship of the British Catholic hierarchy and the regular clergy. He went to Rome with it, and later Manning came with Edward Bagshawe to join him in discussions. Clifford may have contributed in draft to Romanos Pontifices, intended to deal with the whole Catholic Church.

In 1887 Clifford helped the nuns of Syon Abbey to create a new monastery in his family town, Chudleigh Abbey. He died in office on 14 August 1893, aged 69.

== Bibliography ==
- Brady, W. Maziere (1876). The Episcopal Succession in England, Scotland and Ireland, A.D. 1400 to 1875. Vol. 3. Rome: Tipografia Della Pace.

Catholic Church titles
Preceded by Thomas Burgess	Bishop of Clifton; 1857–1893	Succeeded by William Robert Brownlow
