= Thomas Burgess (bishop of Clifton) =

Catholic bishop in England (1791–1854)

Thomas Burgess O.S.B.
- Bishop of Clifton
- Church: Catholic Church
- Diocese: Diocese of Clifton
- In office: 27 June 1851 – 27 November 1854
- Predecessor: Joseph William Hendren
- Successor: William Clifford

Orders
- Ordination: 1814
- Consecration: 27 June 1851 by Nicholas Wiseman

Personal details
- Born: 1 October 1791 Clayton Green (in present-day Clayton-le-Woods), Lancashire, Kingdom of Great Britain
- Died: 27 November 1854 (aged 63) Westbury-on-Trym, Bristol, United Kingdom of Great Britain and Ireland

Thomas Burgess OSB Thomas Burgess OSB (1 October 1791 – 27 November 1854) was an English Roman Catholic prelate who served as Bishop of Clifton from 1851 to 1854.

== Early life and ministry ==
Born in Clayton Green, Lancashire on 1 October 1791, he was educated at Ampleforth Abbey, where he made his profession as a Benedictine on 13 October 1807. Burgess was ordained to the priesthood in 1813 and elected Prior of Ampleforth in July 1818. He left Ampleforth and the Benedictine Order in 1830, becoming a secular clergyman in order to assist Bishop Peter Baines in establishing Prior Park College, Bath. His subsequent ministry appointments were first to Cannington, then to Portland Chapel, Bath, and finally to Monmouth where he served from 1835 to 1851. When he was appointed, the local Roman Catholics were meeting in the Robin Hood Inn; they were not allowed to build St Mary's Roman Catholic Church until 1837.

His last appointment before being elevated to the Episcopate was as Vicar General of Newport.

== Episcopal career ==
He was appointed Bishop of the Diocese of Clifton by the Holy See on 27 June 1851, and consecrated at St George's Cathedral, Southwark on 27 July 1851. The principal consecrator was Cardinal Nicholas Wiseman, Archbishop of Westminster, and the principal co-consecrators were Bishop William Wareing of Northampton and Bishop William Bernard Ullathorne of Birmingham.

He died in office in Westbury-on-Trym, Bristol, on 27 November 1854, aged 63.

Catholic Church titles
Preceded by Joseph William Hendren	Bishop of Clifton; 1851–1854	Succeeded by William Hugh Joseph Clifford
