= The Invisible Circus =

The Invisible Circus may refer to:

- The Invisible Circus, the 1995 debut novel by Jennifer Egan
- The Invisible Circus (film), a 2001 movie adaptation of Egan's novel, starring Cameron Diaz
- The Invisible Circus (play), a play by Sumner Locke Elliot, first performed in 1946
- The Invisible Circus (circus troupe), a circus troupe based in Bristol
