= St Mary's Roman Catholic Church, Monmouth =

St Mary's Roman Catholic Church
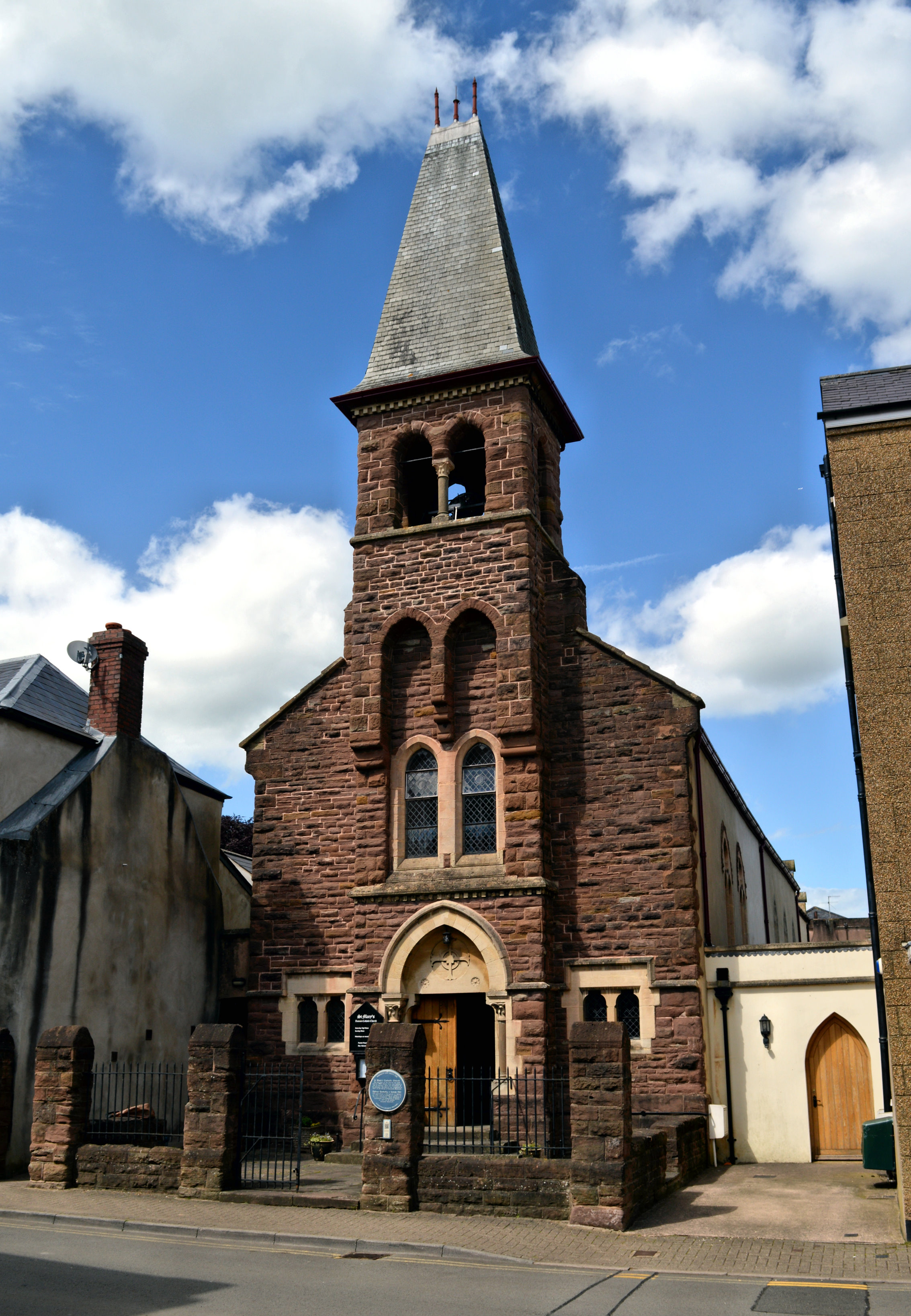
- St Mary's Catholic Church
- St Mary's Roman Catholic Church
- 51°48′44.3″N 2°42′47.1″W
- Location: Monmouth, Monmouthshire
- Country: Wales
- Denomination: Roman Catholic
- Website: monmouthandrosscatholicchurches.uk

Architecture
- Architect: including Benjamin Bucknall
- Years built: 1778

Clergy
- Priest: Fr Nicholas James

St Mary's Roman Catholic Church, in St Mary's Street near the centre of Monmouth, is the earliest post-Reformation Catholic public place of worship to be permitted in Wales. The church is a late Georgian Roman Catholic church with later Victorian additions by the Catholic convert architect Benjamin Bucknall. It has been designated as a Grade II listed building since 15 August 1974, and is one of 24 buildings on the Monmouth Heritage Trail.

== History and architecture ==
After the sixteenth century, Monmouth was a centre for recusancy. The town had, in 1773, one of the highest proportions of Catholics in England and Wales. The Penal Laws against Catholics were relaxed in 1778, through the Papists Act, and Monmouth magistrates were petitioned to erect a "Public Catholick Chapel in the Town". One of the petitioners, Michael Watkins, was then the landlord of the Robin Hood Inn in Monnow Street, where Mass had been celebrated hitherto in an upper room. Lobbying resulted in permission being given for this church three years before a similar church in Chepstow. However, because of a local by-law aimed at making Nonconformist and Catholic buildings as inconspicuous as possible, it had to concede that the building should not look like a church. The entrance was not allowed to open on to the highway and Catholic worshippers were required to arrive at the chapel one at a time. The church was originally set back discreetly from the road, concealed by a row of cottages. The cottages were demolished in Bucknall's rebuilding, after discrimination against Catholics had been eased.

The original building forms the area of the present sanctuary and sacristy, and the stained glass window to the left of the sanctuary is Georgian Gothic in style. The earliest part of the church is the east end, of 1793. In 1829 came Catholic Emancipation, and the chapel was extended in 1837 with the completion of the chancel, half the length of the present nave. This was followed in 1871 by an extensive rebuilding by Benjamin Bucknall. This included the demolition of the cottages fronting the church and the erection of the tower and an elaborate frontage in Old Red Sandstone. Newman describes the "double bellcote crowned by a precipitously steep slate roof." Internally, the font depicts the serpent of Eden entwined around the stem.

From 1835 to 1851 the Roman Catholic priest in Monmouth was Thomas Burgess who went on to be the Bishop of Clifton.

== Internal features ==
The church includes many features, but of especial note is its association with Saint John Kemble, who was a missionary in Monmouthshire and Herefordshire. He was martyred for his faith at Hereford on 22 August 1679 and lies buried at nearby Welsh Newton. The Marches were an area where the old faith continued long after the Reformation, and many of the local big houses gave sanctuary to Catholic services conducted clandestinely by priests who could suffer extreme penalties if they were discovered. The parish of St Mary's organises a pilgrimage to St John Kemble's tomb on the Sunday nearest to the date of his martyrdom. The church also includes an altar dedicated to the saint's memory, which was used for the celebration of Mass during penal times at Pembridge Castle: this consists of two benches that could be separated to disguise its purpose. These historic buildings were refurbished in 2009/2010.

The church possesses a fourteenth-century processional cross; an embroidered red chasuble dating from about 1502; and a hinged cross, possibly of Spanish origin, dating from the seventeenth century.
