= William Brownlow (bishop) =

Catholic bishop

William Robert Brownlow
- Bishop of Clifton
- Church: Catholic Church
- Diocese: Diocese of Clifton
- In office: 20 March 1894 – 9 November 1901
- Predecessor: William Clifford
- Successor: George Burton

Orders
- Ordination: 22 December 1866
- Consecration: 1 May 1894 by Herbert Vaughan

Personal details
- Born: 4 July 1830 Wilmslow, Cheshire, United Kingdom of Great Britain and Ireland
- Died: 9 November 1901 (aged 71)

William Robert Brownlow (4 July 1830 – 9 November 1901) was an English prelate of the Catholic Church. He served as Bishop of Clifton from 1894 to 1901.

Born in Wilmslow on 4 July 1830, Brownow was the son of Reverend William Brownlow, Rector of Wilmslow, Cheshire. He was educated at Rugby and at Trinity College, Cambridge, where he graduated in 1852. In 1853 he was appointed Curate of Great Wyrley, Staffordshire. He subsequently served as curate at St Bartholomew's, Moor Lane, at Tetbury, Gloucestershire, and at St. John's, Torquay, before being received into the Roman Catholic Church on 1 November 1863. After further studies of theology at the English College, Rome, he was ordained to the priesthood on 22 December 1866.

Back in the United Kingdom, Brownlow was appointed missioner at St Mary's church, Torquay, in 1867, and Canon of Plymouth in 1878. He was appointed the Bishop of the Diocese of Clifton by the Holy See on 20 March 1894. His consecration to the Episcopate took place on 1 May 1894, the principal consecrator was Cardinal Herbert Vaughan, Archbishop of Westminster, and the principal co-consecrators were Bishop John Vertue of Portsmouth and Bishop Charles Graham of Plymouth.

Brownlow was co-editor of the Roma Sotteranea; or an Account of the Roman Catacombs alongside James Spencer Northcote and was also the author of various papers on slavery and serfdom in Europe, and on Christian antiquities. He was an active supporter of the Society for the Prevention of Cruelty to Children.

He died in office on 9 November 1901, aged 71.

Catholic Church titles
Preceded by William Hugh Joseph Clifford	Bishop of Clifton; 1894–1901	Succeeded by George Ambrose Burton
