= Edward Doran Webb =

British architect (1864–1931)

Edward Doran Webb FSA (1864–1931) was a British ecclesiastical architect.

Based in Wiltshire, he worked on several churches including at Salisbury, Finchley, Swindon and Aldermaston. Webb also designed the Birmingham Oratory. He had strong connections to the University of Cambridge, and designed a large stone country house for a senior member of St John's College in the west of the city before retiring; the limestone house is in the stately Queen Anne style.

Webb was a fellow of the Society of Antiquaries of London, and this affiliation may be the source of his connection to scholars at the University of Cambridge. He was married to Elise Jeanette Charlton on 30 January 1899 and lived at Gaston Manor in Tisbury, Wiltshire almost until the end of his life.
