= St Osmund's Church, Salisbury =

St Osmund's Church
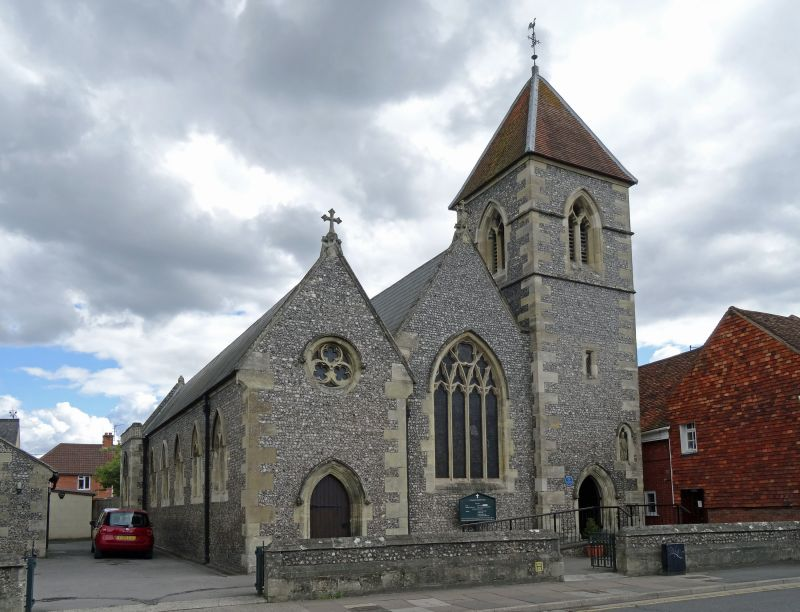

- Location within Wiltshire Location within England
- 51.0646°N 1.7937°W
- OS grid reference: SU 14555 29498
- Location: Salisbury
- Country: England
- Denomination: Roman Catholic
- Website: salisburycatholics.org

History
- Status: Parish church
- Founder: John Lambert
- Dedication: Saint Osmund
- Consecrated: 6 September 1848

Architecture
- Functional status: Active
- Heritage designation: Grade II listed
- Architect(s): Augustus Pugin; Edward Doran Webb
- Style: Gothic Revival
- Groundbreaking: 8 April 1847

Administration
- Province: Birmingham
- Diocese: Clifton
- Deanery: St Edith of Wilton
- Parish: Holy Redeemer & St Osmund

Listed Building – Grade II*
- Official name: Church of St Osmund (Roman Catholic)
- Designated: 28 February 1952
- Reference no.: 1241985

St Osmund's Church is a Roman Catholic church in Salisbury, Wiltshire, England. It was designed by Augustus Pugin in the Gothic Revival style and built in 1847–1848. It is on Exeter Street, opposite Bishop Wordsworth's School, in the city centre. It is a Grade II listed building.

== History ==
=== Background ===
After the Reformation, the Catholic community in Salisbury celebrated mass in a house on Cathedral Close owned by Baron Arundell of Wardour. In the early 1800s, the Arundells left the area. In 1811, a former inn, the World's End Inn on St Martin's Lane, was bought so that a small chapel could be built there.

=== Construction ===
In the 1840s, the chapel was too small to accommodate the increasing Catholic population of the city. John Lambert (1815–1892), later the first Catholic mayor of Salisbury, bought the site for the current church and presbytery, and commissioned Augustus Pugin to design the church; Pugin had converted to Catholicism in 1835 and had previously lived in Salisbury for some years. On 8 April 1847, the foundation stone was laid by Bishop William Ullathorne, the Vicar Apostolic of the Western District. On 6 September 1848, the church was consecrated.

=== Description ===
The church is built of flint and stone, and originally had a chancel, nave and south aisle, and a south-west tower with a pyramidal roof. Enlargement of the church in 1894 was designed by Edward Doran Webb: a gabled north aisle was added and the south aisle altered.

The altars were designed by Pugin. In 1850, stained glass designed by Pugin and made by Hardman & Co. was installed in the church. In the 1980s, the walls in the chancel were repainted according to the original Pugin design. In 1982, stained glass was installed, showing the Martyrs of England and Wales.

Nikolaus Pevsner wrote in 1963 that the church is "Really of no architectural interest inside or out". Julian Orbach, revising Pevsner's volume in 2021, prefers to describe the church as "plain rather than inspiring".

A church school was built in 1867 on the north part of the site, in matching flint and stone, to designs by Pugin's son E. W. Pugin. Now used as the church hall, it too is Grade II listed.

== Parish and services ==
St Osmund's Church is one of two churches in the titular parish of St Osmund's, the other being St Gregory and the English Martyrs Church on St Gregory's Avenue. St Osmund's has four Sunday masses at 9:00, 11:00, and 18:00, with an Ordinariate Mass at 12:15pm. St Gregory's has a Saturday Vigil Mass at 18.00 and a Sunday Mass at 9:00am. There are also occasional masses at the Chapel of the Good Shepherd, Downton.

== See also ==
- Roman Catholic Diocese of Clifton
