= Mervyn Alexander =

Bishop of Clifton from 1974 to 2001

- Church: Diocese of Clifton
- In office: 1974 – 2001
- Previous post: Prelate

Orders
- Ordination: 18 July 1948

Personal details
- Born: 29 June 1925 London, England
- Died: 14 August 2010 (aged 85)

Styles of Mervyn Alexander
- Reference style: The Right Reverend
- Spoken style: My Lord
- Religious style: Bishop

Mervyn Alban Alexander (29 June 1925 – 14 August 2010) was the Bishop of the Roman Catholic Diocese of Clifton from 1974 to 2001.

He was born on 29 June 1925 in Highbury, London, the eldest son of William and Grace Alexander. In 1926 the family moved from London to Salisbury, Wiltshire.

== Education/priesthood ==
He began his education at Bishop Wordsworth's School in Salisbury. He later attended Prior Park College, Bath, then run by the Irish Christian Brothers. He trained for the priesthood at the Venerable English College, Rome and was ordained Priest on 18 July 1948 in the Leonine College, Rome. He continued his theological studies at the Pontifical Gregorian University, Rome, and obtained his Doctorate in Divinity in 1951.

Returning to England he was appointed curate in the Pro-Cathedral parish where he served from 1951 to 1964. He acted as Chaplain to the Bristol Maternity and Homeopathic Hospitals. He also became part-time Chaplain to the University of Bristol in 1953 and was appointed full-time Chaplain in 1964. During this time he opened the University Catholic Chaplaincy which continues to serve students today.

In 1967 he was appointed as Parish Priest of Our Lady of Lourdes, Weston-Super-Mare, until he was appointed Auxiliary Bishop of Clifton on 25 April 1972. He succeeded Joseph Rudderham on 20 December 1974 to become the 8th Bishop of Clifton.

== Posts ==
In addition to his work in the diocese he held a number of national posts. He was a member of the Vatican Secretariat for Non-Believers (1973 to 1983), and Chairman of the National Commission for Non-Believers (1973 to 1983), Vice-Chairman of the Liturgy Commission (1977 to 1983), and also Episcopal President of the Catholic Child Welfare Council (1976 to 1983).

In 1982 he was Chairman of the committee concerned with spiritual preparation for the visit of Pope John Paul II to England and Wales. He was Chairman of the Committee for Art and Architecture from 1983 until 1999, as well as Episcopal Adviser to Marriage Encounter from 1980. He presided at a Diocesan Synod which took place from 1987 to 1988.

From the early 1990s until 1999, Bishop Alexander was the Patron of the Catholic Association Pilgrimage Hospitalité.

During 1996, Alexander organised a panel to review the Neocatechumenal Way and later banned the organisation within the Clifton Diocese.

In February 2001 Bishop Alexander was recognised by the University of Bristol for his contribution to the life of the City and the University and was awarded an honorary Doctorate of Laws (LLD). The commendation speech was given by the then Bishop of Bristol, Right Reverend Barry Rogerson.

In 1985 he was decorated by Commander's Cross of Order of Polonia Restituta (polish government-in-exile).

== Retirement ==
He was succeeded as Bishop of Clifton by Bishop Declan Lang on 28 March 2001. On retiring as Bishop of Clifton he served as Parish Priest of St Joseph's, Weston-super-Mare. Bishop Mervyn died on 14 August 2010 at St Angela's Home, Clifton, at the age of 85.

Catholic Church titles
Preceded by Joseph Rudderham	Bishop of Clifton; 1974—2001	Succeeded by Declan Lang
