= John Lambert (civil servant) =

British solicitor and civil servant

Sir John Lambert KCB PC (4 February 1815 – 27 January 1892) was a British solicitor and civil servant.

The son of Daniel Lambert, of Milford Hall, Salisbury, Lambert was educated at Downside School, the Catholic institution in Somerset, before becoming a solicitor in Salisbury. In the 1840s, he was behind the construction of the first Catholic church in Salisbury, St Osmund's, in the city centre. In 1854, he was elected Mayor of Salisbury, the first Roman Catholic mayor of a cathedral city since the Reformation.

In 1857, Lambert was appointed an inspector under the Poor Law Board. In 1863, he was called upon by Charles Pelham Villiers to frame relief measures for the Lancashire Cotton Famine: his work resulted in the Union Relief Aid Acts and the Public Works (Manufacturing Districts) Act 1864. In the following years, Lambert was involved in the preparation of the Reform Bill 1866 for Lord John Russell's government, which was introduced by William Ewart Gladstone. He subsequently was involved in the framing of the Reform Act 1867 for Benjamin Disraeli, and the Irish Church Act 1869 and the Landlord and Tenant (Ireland) Act 1870 for Gladstone. He also drew up the scheme for the Metropolitan Poor Act 1867 (30 & 31 Vict. c. 6) and served on many government commissions.

In 1871, Lambert was appointed Permanent Secretary to the Local Government Board, resigning in 1882.

Lambert was appointed a CB on the recommendation of Gladstone, and a KCB in 1879 on the recommendation of Disraeli. He was sworn of the Privy Council in 1885. An authority on church music, he helped to revive the singing of plainchant, and received a gold medal for service in connexion to church music from Pope Pius IX. With the publisher James Burns, he established the Catholic publishing house Burns & Lambert (later Burns & Oates).

Lambert died in January 1892 and was buried in the graveyard behind St Osmund's Church, Salisbury.
