= Bosco MacDonald =

English Catholic bishop (born 1963)

The Right Reverend Bosco MacDonald
- Bishop of Clifton
- Church: Catholic Church
- Province: Birmingham
- Diocese: Clifton
- Appointed: 14 March 2024
- Predecessor: Declan Lang

Orders
- Ordination: 6 July 1991
- Consecration: 8 May 2024 by Bernard Longley

Personal details
- Born: John Bosco MacDonald; 21 July 1963 (age 63) Bath, Somerset
- Denomination: Catholic
- Coat of arms

John Bosco MacDonald (born 21 July 1963) is an English prelate of the Catholic Church. He was appointed as the tenth bishop of Clifton by Pope Francis on 14 March 2024.

== Biography ==
John Bosco MacDonald, known as Bosco, was born in Bath on 21 July 1963 and was baptised at the parish church of St Mary’s in the city. He was educated at St Brendan's College in Bristol before completing his studies in formation for the priesthood at the English College, Valladolid, Spain. He was ordained to the clergy of the Diocese of Clifton on 6 July 1991.

The first appointment of his diocesan ministry was at the Cathedral parish as an assistant priest, before being made parish priest of St John Fisher in Wellington from 1995-1998. He then moved to Holy Family Church in Patchway. In November 1997, Bishop MacDonald was appointed the Diocesan Coordinator of Chaplains for Primary, Secondary and Sixth Form sectors, and from 1998–2023 was a member of the Retired Priests Committee.

On New Year's Day 2003, he was appointed Dean of Bristol North West and held the role for four years. His next parish appointment was to St Gregory the Great with St Thomas More in Cheltenham. During this time, in March 2009, he was installed as Canon of the Cathedral Chapter.

In 2010, MacDonald was appointed Amicus Clero for the diocese. The term means "friend of the clergy" and the incumbent offers a listening ear for any priest with pastoral or personal concerns. He was appointed Dean of Clifton Cathedral in September 2015, a position he held until Pope Francis appointed him the tenth Bishop of Clifton on 14 March 2024. During the covid lockdown livestream from Clifton Cathedral was established and MacDonald celebrated Mass on his own, but available online, from the Blessed Sacrament chapel.

He has held the following positions: Parochial Vicar at the Cathedral Church of Saints Peter and Paul in Bristol (1991–1995); parish priest of St John Fisher in Wellington (1995–1998); diocesan coordinator of school chaplains (1997); parish priest of Holy Family, in Patchway (1998–2008); Vicar Forane (Dean) of the Bristol North area (2003–2007); parish priest of St Gregory the Great with St Thomas More in Cheltenham (2009–2015); Dean and Parish Priest of the Cathedral Church of Saints Peter and Paul in Bristol since 2015 and Canon of the same Cathedral since 2009.

Catholic Church titles
| Preceded by Declan Lang | Bishop of Clifton; 2024—present | Succeeded by incumbent |
