= Church of Our Lady St Mary of Glastonbury =

Roman Catholic diocesan shrine and parish church in Glastonbury, Somerset, England

Our Lady St Mary of Glastonbury
- Shrine and Parish Church of Our Lady, Glastonbury
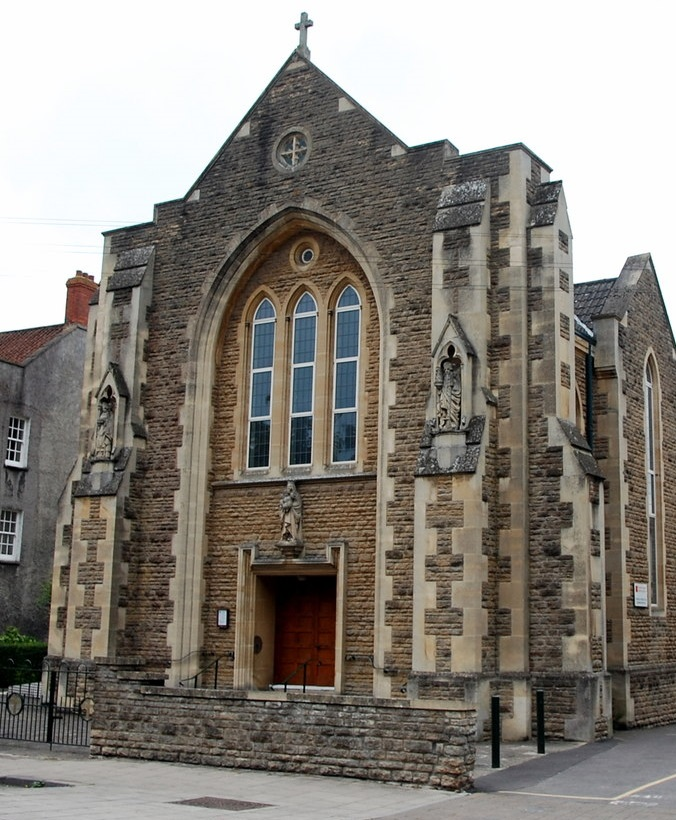
- The front of the church from Magdalene Street

- Location within Somerset Location within England
- 51.1450°N 2.7178°W
- Location: Glastonbury, Somerset
- Country: England
- Denomination: Catholic Church

History
- Dedication: St Mary

Architecture
- Groundbreaking: 1939
- Completed: 1940
- Construction cost: £11,000

Administration
- Province: Ecclesiastical province of Birmingham
- Metropolis: Archdiocese of Birmingham
- Diocese: Diocese of Clifton
- Deanery: Blessed Richard Whiting

Clergy
- Priest: Fr Mark Moran

The Church of Our Lady St Mary of Glastonbury in Glastonbury, Somerset, England, is a Roman Catholic church that was completed in 1940, which includes the Diocesan Shrine of Our Lady of Glastonbury.

== History ==
The church sits along Magdalene Street facing the medieval Abbot's Kitchen across the road in Glastonbury Abbey. On the same site once stood the original Catholic church in an old converted stable, which was pulled down in 1938. Behind the church there was once the St Louis Convent school, which operated from 1925 until 1984. The new church was made at a cost of £11,000 and was built using Bath and Corsham stone. At the front of the church, carved into the stone, are statues of the Madonna and Child, Saint Dunstan to the left and Richard Whiting, the last abbot of Glastonbury, on the right. Father Michael Fitzpatrick worked on raising these funds and relied upon local donations to do so.

== Relics ==
After its consecration on July 2, 1941, by Bishop Lee of Clifton, the church was blessed and relics from saints placed within the altar and reliquaries from:

- Oliver Plunkett – Patron saint of peace and reconciliation in Ireland
- Thomas Becket – Patron saint of the Roman Catholic Secular Clergy
- Pope Innocent I – Once pope for 16 years
- Benedict of Nursia – Patron saint of students and the dying, et al.
- Victoria of Albitina – Patron of Anticoli, Italy
- Saint Barbara – Patron saint of artillerymen and miners
- Pope Clement I – Patron saint of stone cutters and sailors

== Interior ==
Behind the altar is the statue of Our Lady St Mary of Glastonbury, which was executed in 1955. Either side is a large tapestry which was woven by the Edinburgh Tapestry Company. It depicts the three Glastonbury Martyrs – Abbot Richard Whiting, his treasurer John Thorne and their companion Roger James – before they were hanged, drawn and quartered at Glastonbury Tor during the Dissolution of the Monasteries. Also depicted are Saints Dunstan, Patrick, Brigid, Joseph of Arimathea, and David, and the monk Richard Bere who was beheaded for refusing to "take the Oath of Henry's supremacy over the Church".

Above the tapestry is a stained glass window depicting the Crucifixion with Mary Magdalene at the feet of Jesus. On the left is the Virgin Mary and on the right is Saint John, a disciple of Jesus.

== List of priests ==
- Fr Francis Burdett, 1926–1928
- Fr Patrick O'Beirne, 1929–1938
- Fr Michael Fitzpatrick, 1938–1944
- Fr William Ryan, 1944–1948
- Fr Joseph Sheehan, 1948–1952
- Fr James O'Brien, 1952–1962
- Fr Sean McNamara, 1962–1967
- Fr John O'Connor, 1968–1982
- Fr Nicholas Tranter, 1982–1984
- Fr Paul Sankey, 1984–1998
- Fr Kevin Knox-Lecky, 1999–2012
- Fr James Finan, 2012–2017
- Fr Bede Rowe, 2017–2019
- The Community of Our Lady of Glastonbury, 2019–2021
- Fr Dominic Findlay-Wilson, 2021–2025
