= List of Catholic dioceses in Great Britain and Ireland =

List of Catholic dioceses in Great Britain and Ireland may refer to:

- List of Catholic dioceses in Great Britain
  - List of Catholic dioceses in Scotland
  - List of Catholic dioceses in England and Wales
- List of Catholic dioceses in Ireland

The Catholic Church is not organised on a state basis in the United Kingdom. In the island of Great Britain, the Church is organised into two separate hierarchies or episcopal conferences: the Catholic Church in England and Wales, and the Catholic Church in Scotland. In the island of Ireland, while Northern Ireland is a constitutional part of the United Kingdom, no separate episcopal conference exists for Northern Ireland; instead, the Church is part of the hierarchy or episcopal conferences of the Catholic Church in Ireland. There are also a number of Eastern Catholic dioceses in the UK.
