= The Invisible Circus (circus troupe) =

The Invisible Circus is a theatre and circus troupe based in Bristol in the United Kingdom. Set up in the 1990s, the group collaborates with Artspace Lifespace to make site-specific performances.

== History ==
The Invisible Circus is a theatre and circus troupe which began performing in 1996 and which is based in the UK since 2002. The circus has performed at events such as Glastonbury Festival 2008. It shares a director with Artspace Lifespace, a sister cooperative which seeks out derelict spaces and converts them into temporary cultural spaces venues. In 2007, the two groups ran a series of performances events called Revelations at the Pro-Cathedral of the Holy Apostles in Clifton, Bristol, winning the Venue magazine's Top Banana award in January 2008. In early 2008 they took over the Bridewell police station in the centre of Bristol.

The circus performed their cabaret shows Carny-Ville and Combustion Club at the Bridewell. It has also organised events at Ashton Court and a club under the railway station.

Doug Francisco, director of the Invisible Circus, formed the Red Rebel Brigade as street theatre in the 1990s and converted the concept into silent, red-robed figures in support of Extinction Rebellion in the late 2010s. The performances inspired other groups to repeat the street theatre at protests in Berlin, Canberra, New York and Tel Aviv.

Artspace Lifespace and The Invisible Circus won funding from Bristol City Council’s 2018 to 2022 Cultural Investment Programme. The Invisible Circus received an emergency grant of £65,000 in 2020 from the Culture Recovery Fund.
