= Declan Lang =

Catholic bishop (born 1950)

The Right Reverend Declan Lang
- Bishop of Clifton
- Province: Birmingham
- Diocese: Clifton
- See: Clifton
- Appointed: 27 February 2001
- Installed: 28 March 2001
- Term ended: 14 March 2024
- Predecessor: Mervyn Alban Alexander
- Successor: Bosco MacDonald

Orders
- Ordination: 7 June 1975 by Derek Worlock
- Consecration: 28 March 2001 by Mervyn Alban Alexander

Personal details
- Born: Declan Ronan Lang; 15 April 1950 (age 76) Cowes, Isle of Wight
- Denomination: Roman Catholic
- Motto: Evangelii Nuntiandi (Proclaim the Gospel)
- Coat of arms

Styles of Declan Lang
- Reference style: The Right Reverend
- Spoken style: My Lord
- Religious style: Bishop

Declan Ronan Lang (born 15 April 1950) is an English prelate of the Roman Catholic Church. He served as the ninth bishop of Clifton from 2001 to 2024.

== Biography ==
Declan Lang was born in Cowes, on the Isle of Wight, to Irish parents. He attended Ryde School, Allen Hall, and St. Edmund's College, Ware. He also earned a Bachelor of Arts degree in history from Royal Holloway, University of London. Lang was ordained to the priesthood by Bishop Derek Worlock on 7 June 1975. He has been particularly noted for the influence he had as a youth chaplain and subsequently on those now playing leading roles in the Catholic community such as the evangelist and charismatic Catholic Sr Maria Natella OP and the ministerial adviser and author Francis Davis; and also for his work as an adult educationalist and as an ecumenist.

He then served as an assistant priest at the cathedral and chaplain to St Edmund's comprehensive school in Portsmouth. Four years after ordination he was appointed secretary to Bishop Emery and chancellor. During this time he also worked on the Diocesan Youth Commission, which he later chaired. For a number of years he went as chaplain with the Portsmouth Group to Lourdes at Easter.

In 1983 he was appointed to the Religious Education Council as Adult Religious Education Adviser, a position he held until 1990; he held this post for seven years. While doing this work he was also Parish Priest of Our Lady, Queen of Apostles, Bishop's Waltham, for four years, and then Parish Priest at Sacred Heart, Bournemouth. As a result of his work in adult religious education he produced together with John O'Shea, Vicky Cosstick and Damian Lundy the book Parish Project. This was to help parishes look at what they were currently doing, evaluate it and plan together its future direction. This scheme has been taken up by a number of parishes throughout the country.

In September 1990 he was appointed Moderator of the Curia and Administrator of St John’s cathedral in Portsmouth. During this time he was also involved in organising a summer conference for the Diocese of Portsmouth and helping with conferences in Southwark and Shrewsbury. In January 1996 he was appointed as one of the Vicars General in the Diocese moving from Portsmouth to Abingdon.

Whilst in there he chaired a Working Party jointly sponsored by the Bishop's Conference and the National Conference of Priests looking at clergy appraisal. The Working Party Report was accepted by the Bishop's Conference and since then he has spoken in a number of dioceses about the reasons for and the benefits arising from clergy appraisal.

Lang was consecrated as Bishop of Clifton on 28 March 2001 in Clifton Cathedral by his predecessor, Bishop Mervyn Alexander.

Bishop Lang chairs the committee for Theology Faith and Culture. He is the co-chair of the Anglican-Roman Catholic Committee (ARC) and also the co-chair for the Committee for Roman Catholic and United Reformed Church dialogue in England. Bishop Lang was elected to be the Moderator of the next Churches Together in England Forum to be held in 2009. He is a member of the Mixed Commission of Bishops and Major Religious Superiors and is a trustee of the Pontifical Missionary Societies. Outside the Bishops' Conference he is the President of the Catholic Association which organises a pilgrimage to Lourdes on behalf of the Dioceses of Clifton, East Anglia, Northampton, Portsmouth and Southwark, and of Stonyhurst College.

Within the diocese Bishop Lang instigated a review of diocesan structures and as a result created the Diocesan Department for Evangelisation and Adult Education and a new Department for Schools and Colleges. During this time the Diocesan Liturgical Commission has also been reformed. In 2002 Bishop Lang was appointed an Ecumenical Prebendary of Bristol Cathedral. He is the current chairman of Somerset Churches Together and previous chairman of Bristol Churches Together.

As part of his work as the chairman of the Department of International Affairs in the Catholic Bishops' Conference of England and Wales, Bishop Lang travelled to Lebanon at the request of the Maronite Catholic Church. Bishop Lang hopes that the visit will 'deepen the relationship' between the Bishops of England and Wales and the Catholic community in Lebanon. Bishop Lang said: "I felt the best way to show the Bishops' solidarity with the people of Lebanon and, in particular, the Maronite Catholic community was to accept the invitation to travel to the country and learn about the challenges, hopes and expectations of the people firsthand."

Lang's resignation was accepted by Pope Francis on 14 March 2024; Canon Bosco MacDonald was appointed his successor.

== Sources ==
- Catholic Church of England and Wales

Catholic Church titles
| Preceded by Mervyn Alban Alexander | Bishop of Clifton; 2001—2024 | Succeeded by Bosco MacDonald |
