= Robin Hood Inn, Monmouth =

The Robin Hood Inn
- Tafarn Robin Hood
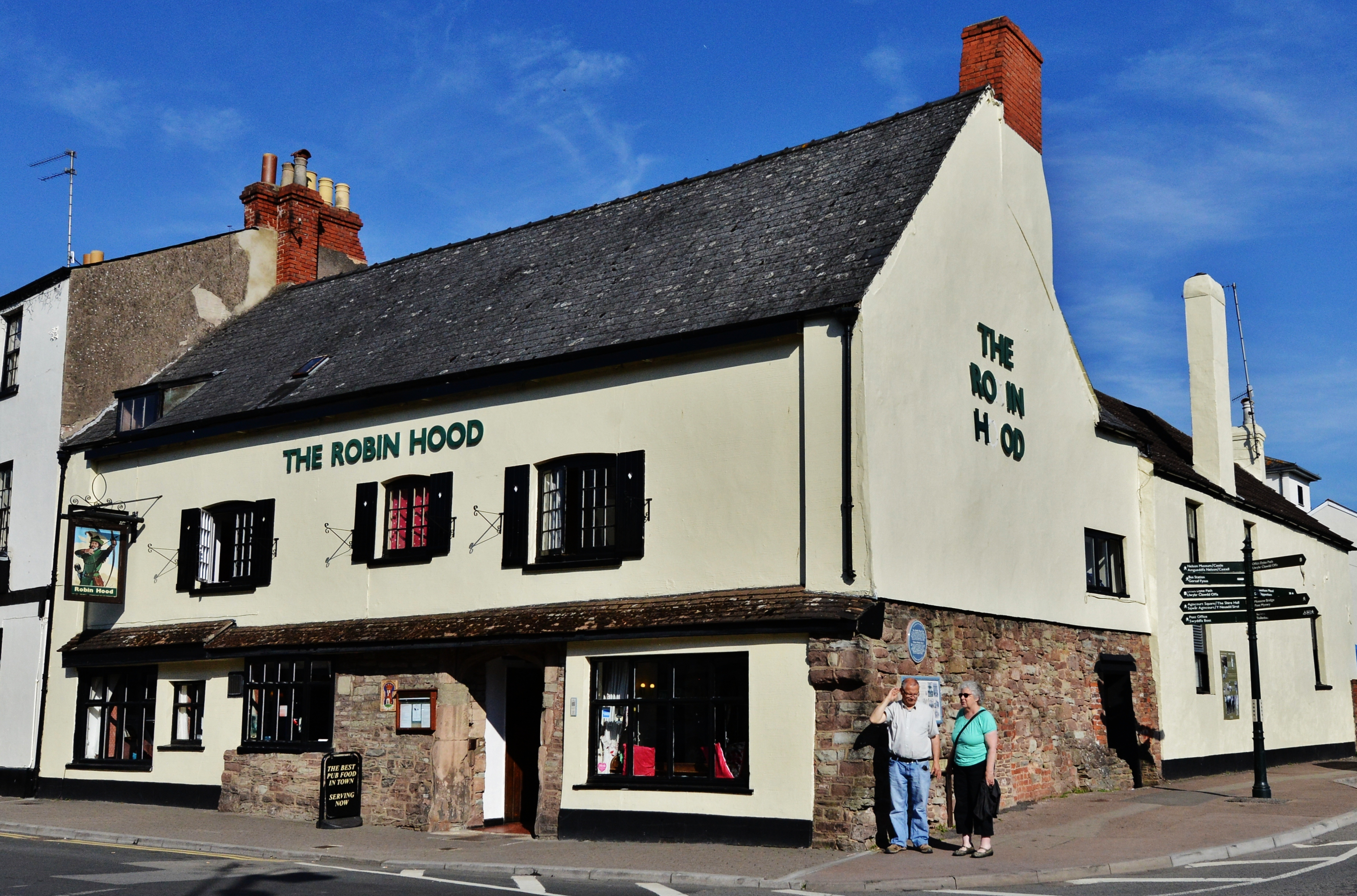
- The Robin Hood in 2015
- Interactive map of the The Robin Hood Inn area

General information
- Type: Public house
- Location: 124 and 126, Monnow Street, Monmouth, Wales
- Coordinates: 51°48′34.2″N 2°43′9.5″W

Design and construction
- Designations: Grade II* listed

The Robin Hood Inn, Nos. 124 and 126, Monnow Street, Monmouth, Monmouthshire, Wales, is a public house of late medieval origins. It was Grade II* listed in 1952.

== History ==
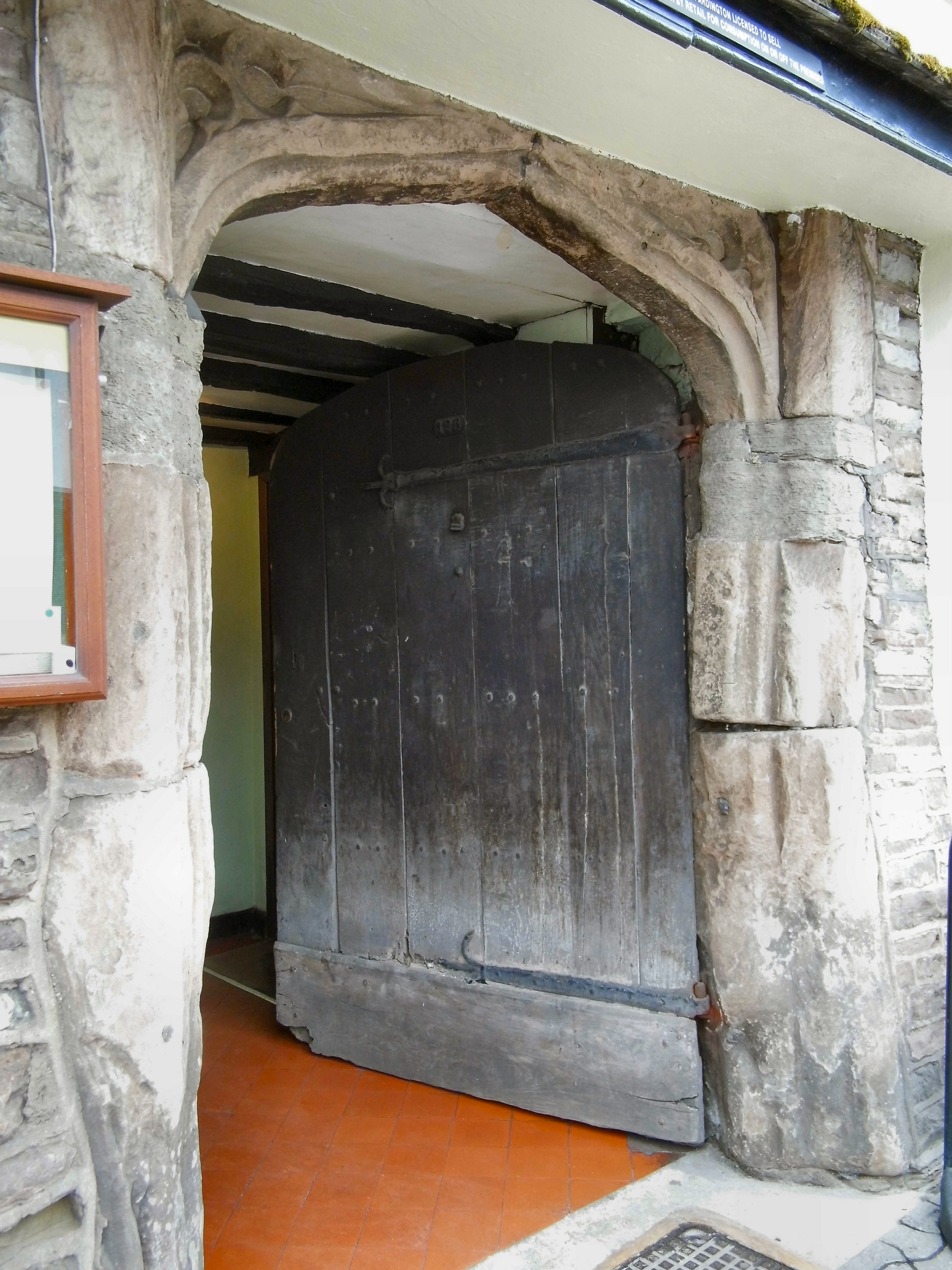
The fifteenth-century doorway

The Robin Hood Inn building has late medieval origins. It is constructed in stone, with a wide, four-centre doorway dating to the fifteenth century, and is a rare medieval survival in Monmouth. After the Reformation, the town was a centre for Catholicism and the landlord in the 1770s, Michael Watkins, allowed Mass to be celebrated in an upper room of the pub. The Penal Laws against Catholics were in force until the Papists Act 1778, and Watkins was amongst those who successfully petitioned Monmouth magistrates to allow a building that would become St Mary's Roman Catholic Church. This public house and the church that Michael Watkins lobbied for are two of the 24 buildings in the Monmouth Heritage Trail. A blue plaque was added to the exterior of the building in 2009, which celebrated the religious history of the building.

In 1882, the landlord, John Richards, was charged with being drunk and disorderly in his own house. He was found guilty and fined 10s and 7s costs. It was designated as a Grade II* listed building on 27 June 1952.
