= Joseph Rudderham =

English prelate

Joseph Edward Rudderham
- Bishop of Clifton
- Church: Catholic Church
- Diocese: Diocese of Clifton
- In office: 14 May 1949 – 31 August 1974
- Predecessor: William Lee
- Successor: Mervyn Alexander

Orders
- Ordination: 31 October 1926
- Consecration: 26 July 1949 by Joseph Masterson

Personal details
- Born: 17 June 1899 Norwich, Norfolk, United Kingdom of Great Britain and Ireland
- Died: 24 February 1979 (aged 79) Cheltenham, Gloucestershire, United Kingdom

Joseph Edward Rudderham (17 June 1899 – 24 February 1979) was an English prelate of the Roman Catholic Church. He served as Bishop of Clifton from 1949 to 1974.

Born in Norwich, Norfolk on 17 June 1899, one of seven children of William Rudderham, a Norwich wine merchant, and his wife Agnes Mary Ann Coan. He received his early education at Norwich Convent, then was sent to attend Junior Seminary at St Bede's College, Manchester in September 1910. He was forced to leave St Bede's in July 1917 when he was conscripted into the army, but returned to the College after the war. In 1919, he went on to St Edmund's College, Ware, Christ's College, Cambridge and the Venerable English College, Rome.

Rudderham was ordained a priest for the Diocese of Northampton on 31 October 1926. He was appointed the Bishop of the Diocese of Clifton by the Holy See on 14 May 1949. His consecration to the Episcopate took place on 26 July 1949, the principal consecrator was Archbishop Joseph Masterson of Birmingham, and the principal co-consecrators were Bishop Thomas Leo Parker of Northampton and Bishop Francis Joseph Grimshaw of Plymouth. He participated in all the four sessions of the Second Vatican Council, held between in 1962 and 1965. Between 1965 and its opening in 1973 Rudderham (as Bishop of Clifton) oversaw the design and construction of a new Clifton Cathedral, the first to be built to the new requirements of the Second Vatican Council.

He retired on 31 August 1974 and assumed the title Bishop Emeritus of Clifton; his successor was Bishop Mervyn Alexander, who had been his auxiliary since 1972. He died on 24 February 1979, aged 79.

Catholic Church titles
Preceded by William Lee	Bishop of Clifton; 1949–1974	Succeeded by Mervyn Alexander
