= Romanos Pontifices =

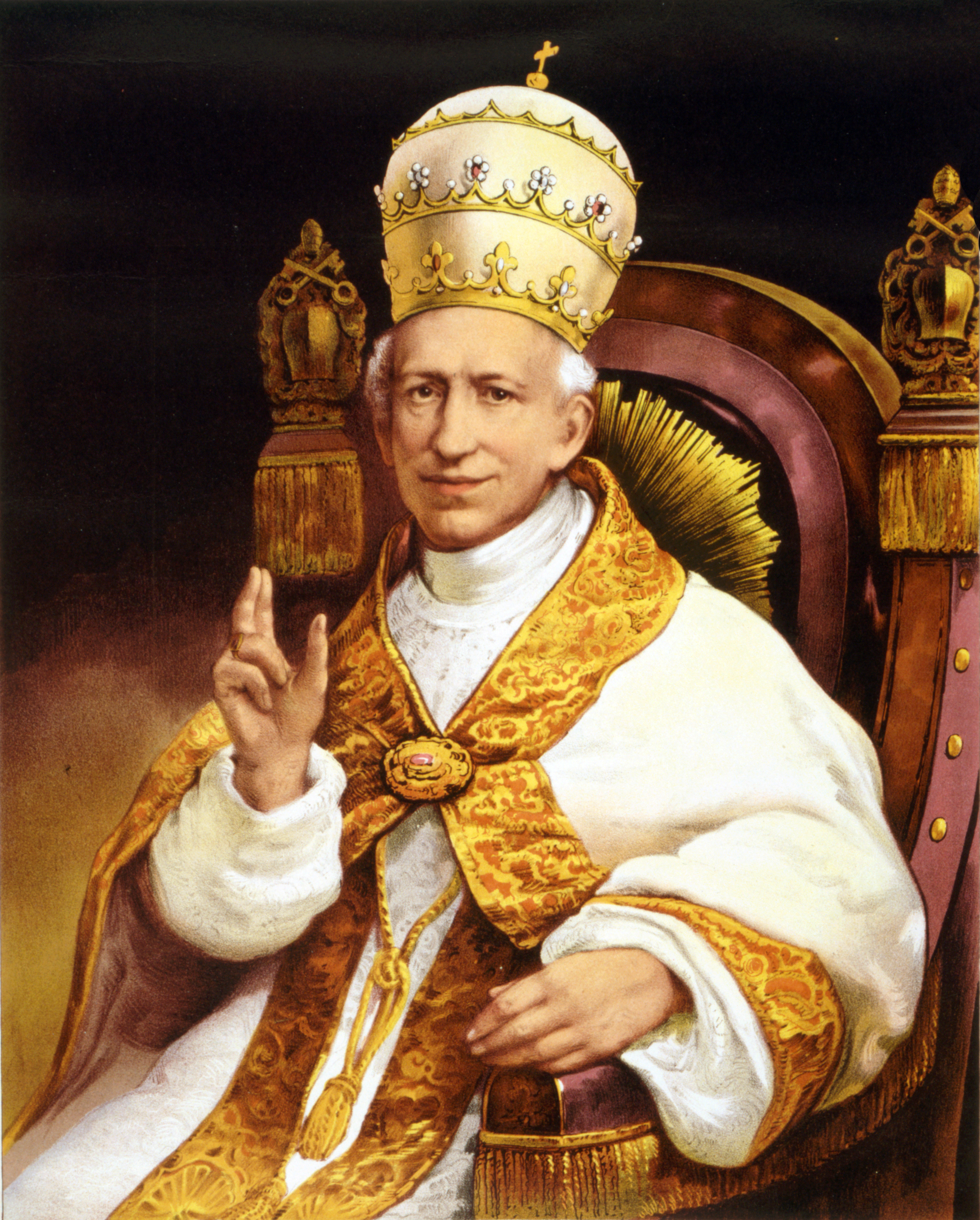
Pope Leo XIII

The apostolic constitution Romanos Pontifices, by Pope Leo XIII, was issued 8 May 1881, and defined the relations in England and Scotland between bishops and members of religious institutes. This constitution was later extended to the United States (25 September 1885), to Canada (14 March 1911), to South America (1 January 1900), to the Philippine Islands (1 January 1910), and quite generally to missionary countries.

== Background ==
The restoration by Pius IX, 29 September 1850, by letters Apostolic Universalis ecclesiæ of the Catholic hierarchy in England, and the consequent transition, gave rise to discussion in various matters of jurisdiction and discipline, particularly between the episcopate and religious institutes.

The chief points of controversy related to the exemption of regulars from the jurisdiction of bishops; the right of bishops to divide parishes or missions conducted by regulars, and to place secular priests in charge of these newly created missions; the obligation of regulars engaged in parish work to attend conferences of the clergy and diocesan synods; the force of their appeal from synodal statutes; their liberty to found new houses, colleges and schools, or to convert existing institutions to other purposes; the right of bishops to visit canonically institutions in charge of regulars; and certain financial matters.

A proposition of Cardinal Manning, made at an annual meeting of the English hierarchy in 1877, to submit these difficulties to Rome for definite settlement, met with unanimous approval. In July, 1878, the bishops of Scotland formally associated themselves with their English brethren in the controversy. Negotiations were opened with Propaganda, but Cardinal Manning later suggested to Pope Leo XIII the appointment of a special commission to examine the claims of the contestants and to prepare a constitution. Repeated delays ensued, so that it was not until 20 September 1880, that a special commission of nine cardinals chosen to consider the question had its first sitting. Four other sessions followed, and in January, 1881, a report was made to the pope.

== Provisions of the Constitution ==
The provisions of the Romanos Pontifices may be grouped into three heads:

- the exemption of religious from episcopal jurisdiction;
- relations to bishops of religious engaged in parochial duties;
- and matters pertaining to temporal goods.

The constitution makes clear the following: though regulars according to canon law are subject immediately to the Holy See, bishops are given jurisdiction over small communities. The constitution Romanos Pontifices makes a further concession exempting regulars as such, living in parochial residences in small numbers or even alone, almost entirely from the jurisdiction of the ordinary. "We hesitate not to declare", it states, "that regulars dwelling in their own monasteries, are exempt from the jurisdiction of the ordinary, except in cases expressly mentioned in law, and generally speaking in matters pertaining to the cure of souls and the administration of the sacraments." In parochial ministrations, then, regulars are subject in all things to episcopal supervision, visitation, jurisdiction, and correction. If engaged in parochial work, religious are obliged to assist at conferences of the clergy as well as at diocesan synods. "We declare," says the constitution, "that all rectors of missions are bound by their office to attend the conferences of the clergy; and moreover we ordain and command that vicars also and other religious enjoying ordinary missionary faculties, living in residences and small missions, do the same."

The Council of Trent prescribes that all having the cure of souls be present at diocesan synods. The constitution says in regard to this question: Let the Council of Trent be observed. Another point of controversy related to appeals from synodal decrees. Regulars are not denied this right. Their appeal from the ordinary's interpretation of synodal statutes in matters pertaining to common law has a devolutive effect only; in matters pertaining to regulars as such, owing to their exemption, an appeal begets a suspensive effect. The bishop's right to divide parishes, even though under the management of regulars, is maintained, providing the formalities prescribed in law be observed. The opinion of the rector of the mission to be divided must be sought; while a bishop is not free to divide a mission in charge of religious without consulting their superior. An appeal, devolutive in character, to the Holy See, should the case require it, is granted from the bishop's decision to divide a parish or mission. The ordinary is free to follow his own judgment in appointing rectors of new missions, even when formed from parishes in charge of regulars. The claim of regulars to preference in these appointments is thus denied. It is unlawful for religious to establish new monasteries, churches, colleges, or schools without the previous consent of the ordinary and of the Apostolic See. Similar permission is required to convert existing institutions to other purposes, except where such change, affecting merely the domestic arrangements or discipline of regulars themselves, is not contrary to the conditions of the foundation. The bishop may exercise the right of canonical visitation in regard to churches and parochial or elementary schools, though they be in charge of regulars. This right does not extend to cemeteries or institutions for the use of religious only; nor to colleges in which religious, according to their rule, devote themselves to the education of youth.

The temporal affairs of a parish or mission are determined by a decree of Propaganda, published 19 April 1969. All goods given to parishes or missions must be accounted for according to diocesan statutes; not, however, donations made to regulars for themselves. It is the duty of the ordinary to see that parochial goods are devoted to the purposes designated by the donors. Inventories (Propaganda, 10 May 1867) will distinguish parochial belongings from those of regulars. These regulations of former decrees are embodied in Romanos Pontifices.
