= William Lee (bishop, born 1875) =

Irish-born prelate

- Bishop of Clifton
- Church: Catholic Church
- Diocese: Diocese of Clifton
- In office: 18 December 1931 – 21 September 1948
- Predecessor: George Burton
- Successor: Joseph Rudderham

Orders
- Ordination: 2 March 1901
- Consecration: 26 January 1932 by Thomas Leighton Williams

Personal details
- Born: 27 September 1875 Mitchelstown, County Cork, United Kingdom of Great Britain and Ireland
- Died: 21 September 1948 (aged 72)

Styles of William Lee
- Reference style: The Right Reverend
- Spoken style: My Lord
- Religious style: Bishop

William Lee (27 September 1875 – 21 September 1948) was an Irish-born prelate of the Roman Catholic Church. He served as Bishop of Clifton from 1931 to 1948.

Born in Mitchelstown, County Cork on 27 September 1875, he was educated at St. Colman's College, Fermoy and at the seminaries of St. John's College, Waterford and St Mary's College, Oscott. He was ordained to the priesthood on 2 March 1901. He was appointed the Bishop of the Diocese of Clifton by the Holy See on 18 December 1931. His consecration to the Episcopate took place on 26 January 1932, the principal consecrator was Archbishop Thomas Leighton Williams of Birmingham, and the principal co-consecrators were Bishop Francis John Vaughan of Menevia and Bishop John Patrick Barrett of Plymouth.

He died in office on 21 September 1948, aged 72.

Catholic Church titles
| Preceded by George Ambrose Burton | Bishop of Clifton; 1931–1948 | Succeeded by Joseph Edward Rudderham |
