= List of Catholic dioceses in Scotland =

The Roman Catholic Church in Scotland comprises two ecclesiastical provinces each headed by a metropolitan archbishop. The provinces in turn are subdivided into 6 dioceses and 2 archdioceses, each headed by a bishop or an archbishop, respectively.

== List of Dioceses ==
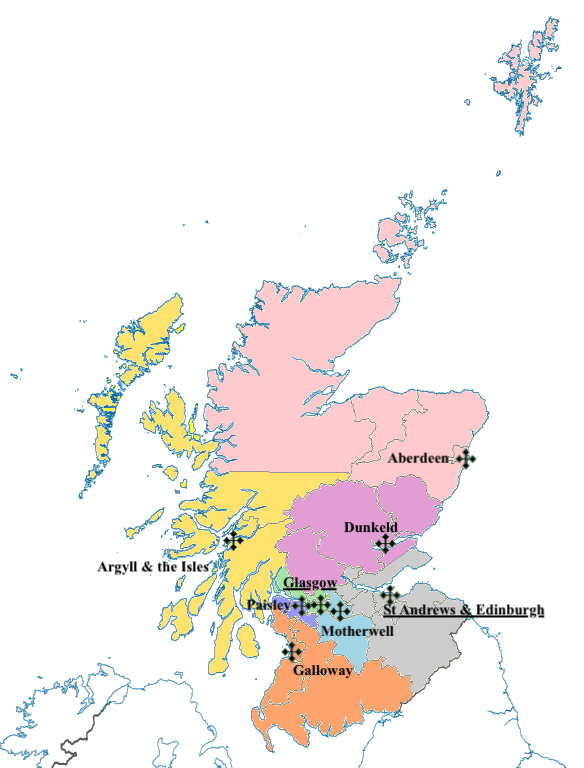
Map of dioceses in Scotland

=== Ecclesiastical province of Saint Andrews and Edinburgh ===
- Archdiocese of Saint Andrews and Edinburgh
  - Diocese of Aberdeen
  - Diocese of Argyll and the Isles
  - Diocese of Dunkeld
  - Diocese of Galloway

=== Ecclesiastical province of Glasgow ===
- Archdiocese of Glasgow
  - Diocese of Motherwell
  - Diocese of Paisley

== See also ==
- Roman Catholicism in Scotland
- List of Roman Catholic dioceses (alphabetical) (including archdioceses)
- List of Roman Catholic dioceses (structured view) (including archdioceses)
- List of Roman Catholic archdioceses (by country and continent)
- List of Roman Catholic dioceses in Great Britain
- Bishops' Conference of Scotland
- Nunciature to Great Britain
- Category:Roman Catholic cathedrals in Scotland
