= Joseph William Hendren =

English Roman Catholic bishop (1791-1866)

The Right Reverend Joseph Hendren O.F.M
- Bishop of Nottingham
- Church: Roman Catholic Church
- Province: Westminster
- Diocese: Nottingham
- Appointed: 22 June 1851
- Installed: 2 December 1851
- Term ended: 23 February 1853
- Predecessor: New Title
- Successor: Richard Roskell
- Previous posts: Bishop of Clifton; Vicar Apostolic of the Western District

Orders
- Ordination: 28 September 1815
- Consecration: 28 July 1848 by William Bernard Ullathorne

Personal details
- Born: 19 October 1791 Birmingham, England
- Died: 14 November 1866 (aged 74)
- Denomination: Roman Catholic

Joseph William Hendren OFM (1791–1866) was an English Roman Catholic bishop. He served three ecclesiastical jurisdictions, first as the Vicar Apostolic of the Western District (1848–1850), then Bishop of Clifton (1850–1851), and finally Bishop of Nottingham (1851–1853).

== Biography ==
Born in Birmingham on 19 October 1791, he was ordained a priest in the Order of Friars Minor on 28 September 1815. He was appointed the Vicar Apostolic of the Western District and Titular Bishop of Verinopolis on 28 July 1848. His consecration to the Episcopate took place on 10 September 1848, the principal consecrator was William Bernard Ullathorne, and the principal co-consecrators were John Briggs and Nicholas Wiseman.

On the restoration of the Catholic Hierarchy in England and Wales, the Western District was divided into the dioceses of Clifton and Plymouth. Hendren was appointed the first Bishop of Clifton on 29 September 1850. The following year, he was appointed the first Bishop to the Diocese of Nottingham on 22 June 1851 and installed on 2 December 1851. He resigned as Bishop of Nottingham on 23 February 1853 and was appointed Titular Bishop of Martyropolis.

He died on 14 November 1866, aged 75.

Catholic Church titles
Preceded by Charles Michael Baggs	Vicar Apostolic of the Western District; 1848–1850	Last appointment
New title	Bishop of Clifton; 1850–1851	Succeeded by Thomas Burgess
New title	Bishop of Nottingham; 1851–1853	Succeeded by Richard Butler Roskell
