= Bishop of Clifton =

- Bishopric

catholic
- Incumbent: Bosco MacDonald

Location
- Ecclesiastical province: Birmingham

Information
- First holder: Joseph William Hendren
- Established: 29 September 1850
- Diocese: Clifton
- Cathedral: Clifton Cathedral

The Bishop of Clifton is the Ordinary of the Roman Catholic Diocese of Clifton in the Province of Birmingham, England.

The see is in the suburb of Clifton in the city of Bristol where the bishop's seat is located at the Cathedral Church of SS. Peter and Paul. The bishop of Clifton has jurisdiction over the counties of Gloucestershire, Somerset and Wiltshire and the city of Bristol.

The current bishop-elect is the Right Reverend Bosco MacDonald, who was appointed the 10th Bishop of Clifton on 14 March 2024.

== History ==
The Apostolic Vicariate of the Western District was created on 30 January 1688 and consisted of the counties of Cornwall, Devon, Dorset, Gloucestershire, Herefordshire, Somerset and Wiltshire, together with all of the principality of Wales. In 1840, the Western District lost territory on the creation of the Welsh District. On the restoration of the Catholic hierarchy in England and Wales by Pope Pius IX in 1850, the Western District was divided into the dioceses of Clifton and Plymouth.

== List of bishops of Clifton ==
Bishops of Clifton
From	Until	Incumbent	Notes
1850	1851	Joseph William Hendren, O.F.M.	Previously Vicar Apostolic of the Western District (1848–1850). Appointed the first Bishop of Clifton on 29 September 1850. Translated to Nottingham on 22 June 1851.
1851	1854	Thomas Burgess	Appointed bishop on 27 June 1851 and consecrated on 27 July 1851. Died in office on 27 November 1854.
1854	1857	See vacant	
1857	1893	William Hugh Joseph Clifford	Appointed bishop on 29 January 1857 and consecrated on 15 February 1857. Died in office on 14 August 1893.
1894	1901	William Robert Brownlow	Appointed bishop on 20 March 1894 and consecrated on 1 May 1894. Died in office on 9 November 1901.
1902	1931	George Ambrose Burton	Appointed bishop on 15 March 1902 and consecrated on 1 May 1902. Died in office on 8 February 1931.
1931	1948	William Lee	Appointed bishop on 18 December 1931 and consecrated on 26 January 1932. Died in office on 21 September 1948.
1949	1974	Joseph Edward Rudderham	Appointed bishop on 14 May 1949 and consecrated on 26 July 1949. Retired on 31 August 1974 and died on 24 February 1979.
1974	2001	Mervyn Alban Alexander	Formerly an auxiliary bishop of Clifton (1972–1974). Appointed Bishop of Clifton on 20 December 1974. Retired on 27 February 2001 and died on 14 August 2010.
2001	2024	Declan Ronan Lang	Appointed bishop on 27 February 2001 and consecrated on 28 March 2001. Retired 14 March 2024.
2024		Bosco MacDonald	Appointed Bishop of Clifton on 14 March 2024.

== Bibliography ==
- Brady, W. Maziere (1876). The Episcopal Succession in England, Scotland and Ireland, A.D. 1400 to 1875. Vol. 3. Rome: Tipografia Della Pace.
