= Makoszowy =

- District of Zabrze
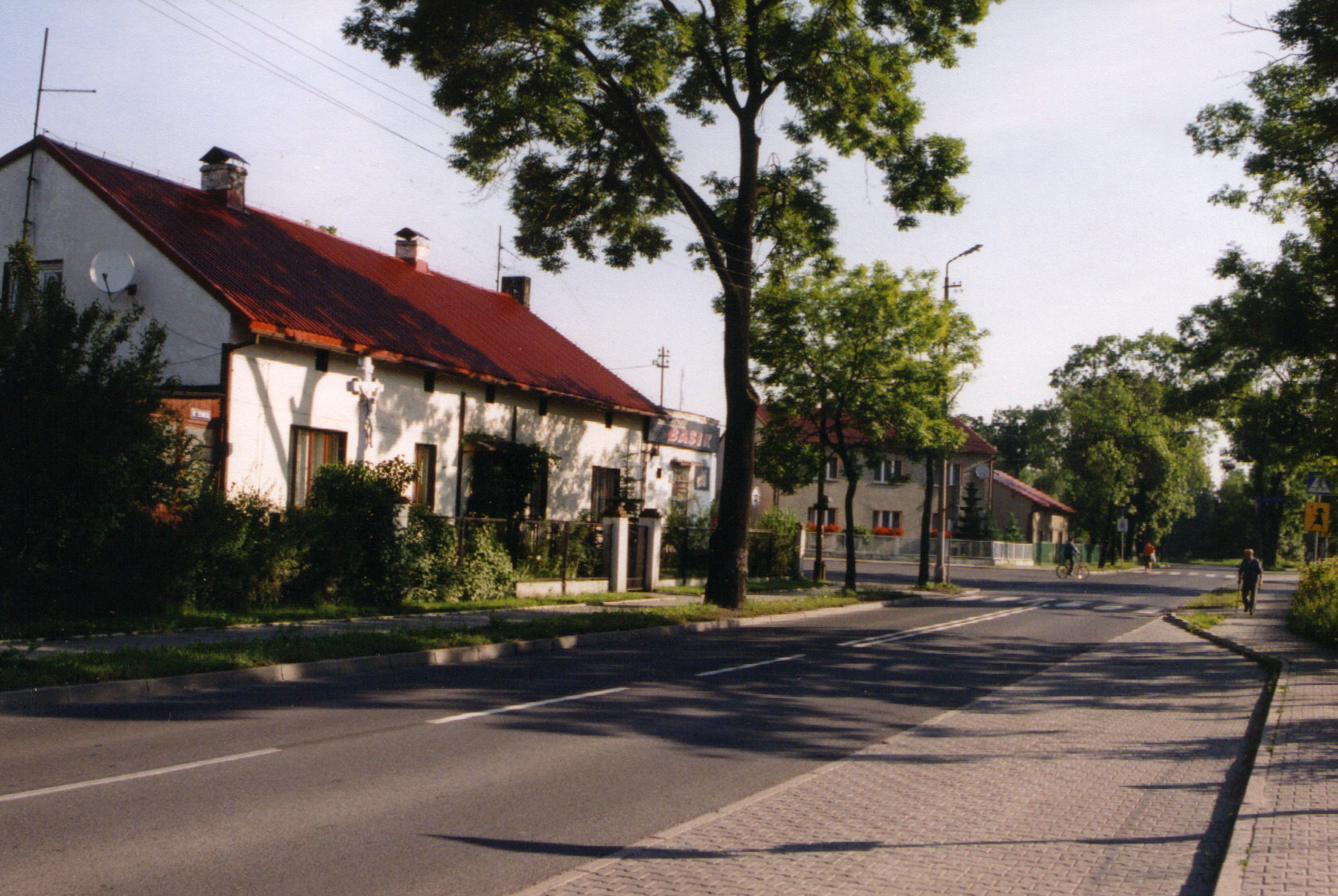
- Legnicka Street in Makoszowy, circa 2001

- Location of Makoszowy within Zabrze
- Coordinates: 50°16′13″N 18°46′33″E
- Country: Poland
- Voivodeship: Silesian
- County/City: Zabrze
- Within city limits: 1951

Area
  - Total: 8.84 km^{2} (3.41 sq mi)
- Time zone: UTC+1 (CET)
  - Summer (DST): UTC+2 (CEST)
- Vehicle registration: SZ
- Primary airport: Katowice Airport

Makoszowy (Zabrze-Makoszowy, German: Makoschau) is a district of Zabrze, Silesian Voivodeship, Poland, located in the southern part of the city.

Makoszowy is located on the Kłodnica river with its two tributaries, Bielczanka and Czarnawka, surrounded with forests and ponds. Anglers like to fish here or just come and have a rest. There is a coal mine. There are about 2,000 people. Easy communication with adjacent towns.

Makoszowy borders the districts of Kończyce and Guido (in the north), the cities of Gliwice (in the west) and Ruda Śląska (in the east), and the villages of Przyszowice and Paniówki (in the south).

== History ==
Makoszwy was an independent settlement for a long time. In early decades of 19th century most of its inhabitants were farmers, but towards the end of the 19th century its character gradually changed into industrial, chiefly connected with coal mines, as Upper Silesian industrial region developed. In 1906, a coal mine was established in the settlement.

During the German occupation (World War II), the occupiers established and operated the E902 forced labour subcamp of the Stalag VIII-B/344 prisoner-of-war camp in the coal mine. The local police chief and four other Polish policemen were murdered by the Russians in the Katyn massacre in 1940.

In 1951, Makoszowy was included within the city limits of Zabrze, and since that time it has been district of Zabrze called Zabrze-Makoszowy.

== Transport ==
The Polish east–west A4 motorway, which is part of the European route E40, runs through Makoszowy, and the junction between the A4 and the north–south A1 motorway (part of European route E75) is located just west of the district, in the neighbouring city of Gliwice. In addition, the Voivodeship road 921 also runs through the district.

== Sports ==
The local football club is Walka Makoszowy. It competes in the lower leagues.

== Notable people ==
Karl Godulla (Polish: Karol Godula), a pioneer of the industrial development of Upper Silesia, was born in Makoszowy.

== Gallery ==
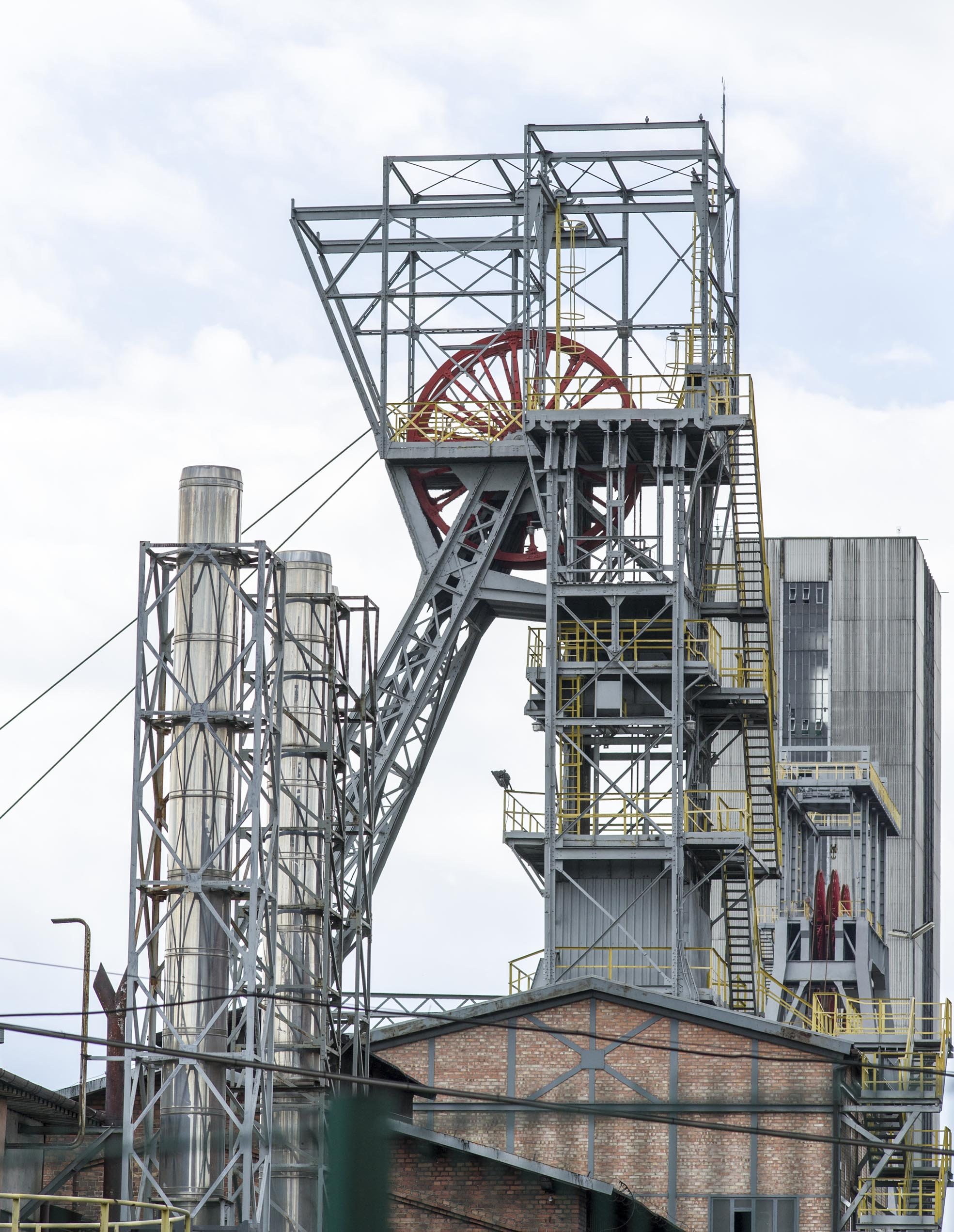
Makoszowy Coal Mine

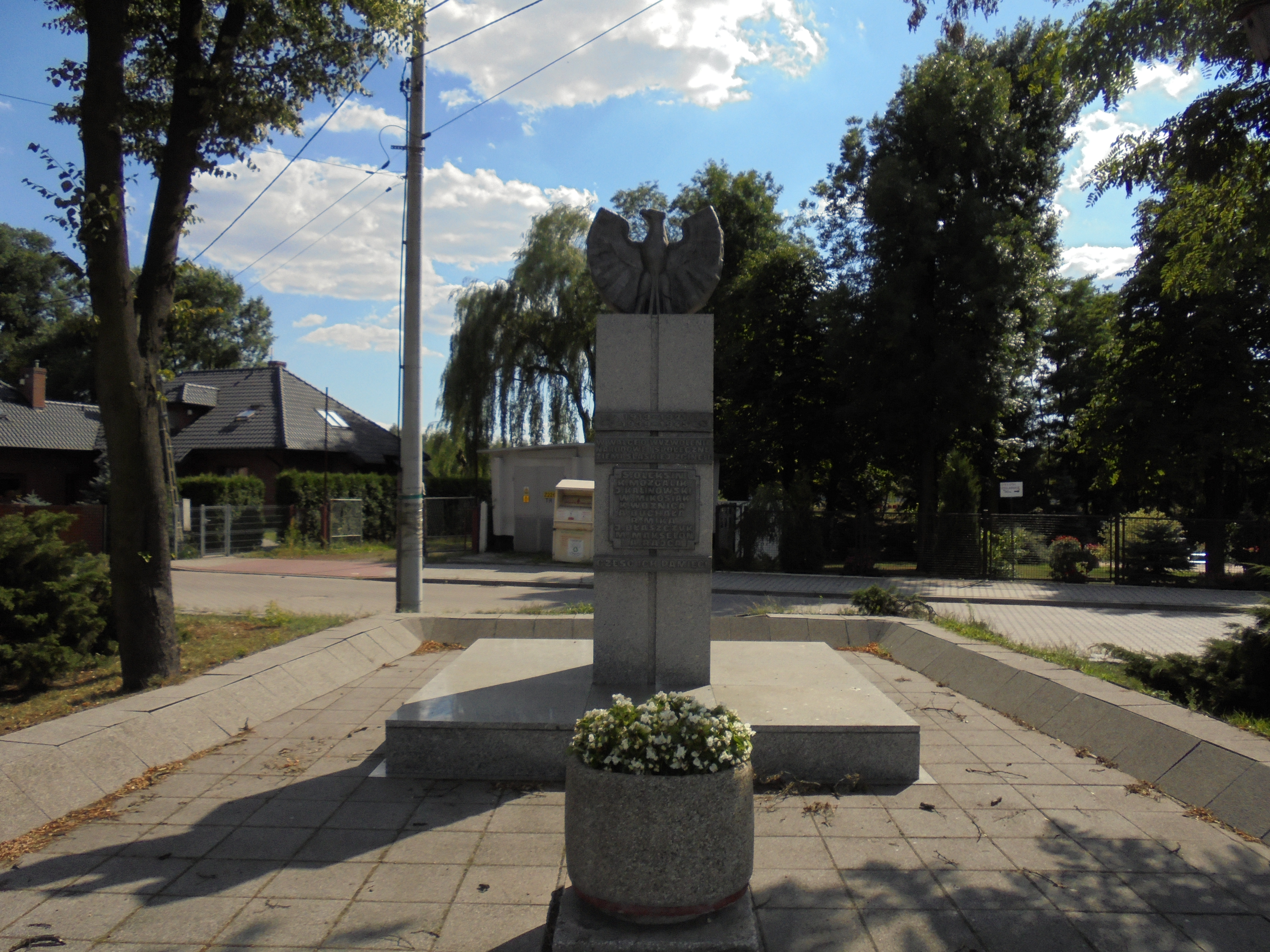
Monument commemorating Poles fallen in the fight for the liberation of Silesia in the Silesian Uprisings and World War II

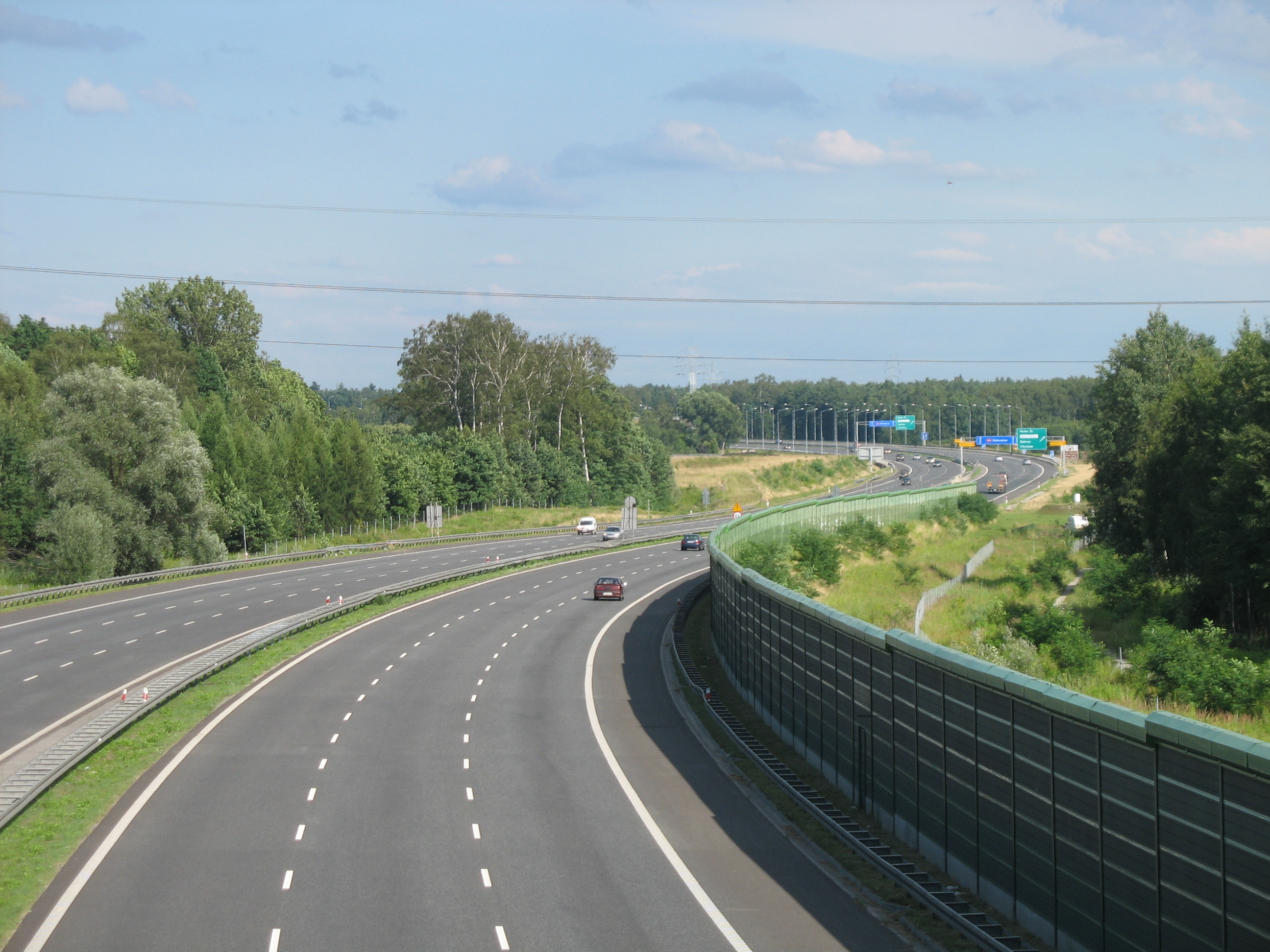
A4 motorway in Makoszowy

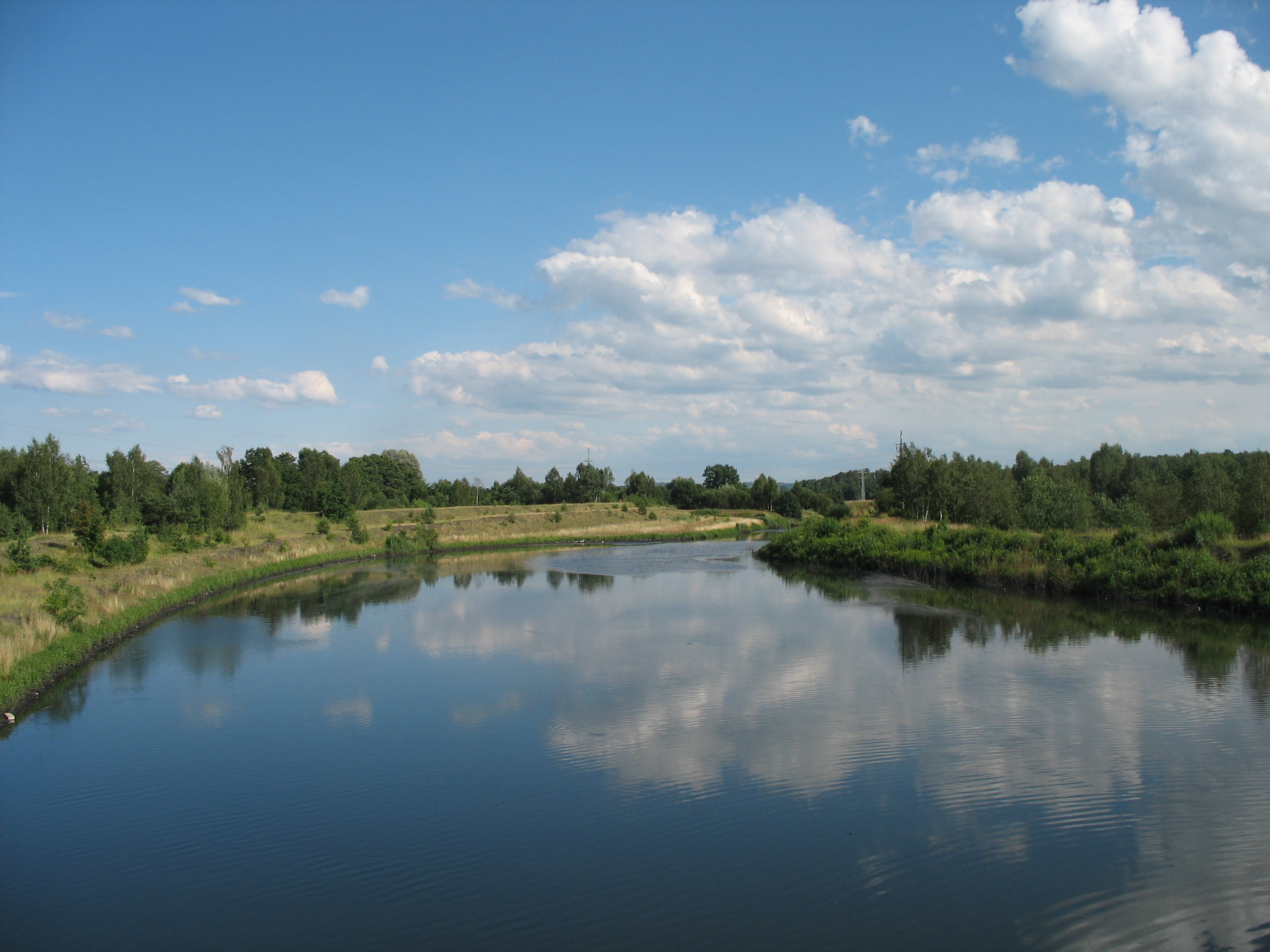
Kłodnica River in Zabrze-Makoszowy
