= Fritz Katz =

Fritz Katz (born in 1898 in Zaborze near Hindenburg, Prussian Silesia; died in 1969 in Athens) was a pioneer in organ transplant techniques, performing one of the first successful grafts of adrenal glands.

After appointments at the medical faculties at Breslau, Fribourg, Frankfurt and Berlin, in the late 1920s he went to Alexandria, Egypt, where he became the chief surgeon at the Jewish Hospital. The hospital was supported by donations from the Jewish community; its staff were of all faiths and its services were freely available to Jews, Christians, Muslims and others.

In 1941, as reported in the British Medical Journal, Dr Katz performed one of the first successful adrenal gland grafts in medical history, saving the life of a patient who had not responded to synthetic hormones and drugs.

Katz was a very public figure, widely known and greatly admired in Alexandria, and had a tendency to be outspoken, a quality which did not put him in good stead with the Nasser regime. In 1959 he was charged with spying for Israel; he was tortured, convicted, and sentenced to death, but the sentence was commuted to life and in 1962 he was released following diplomatic intervention by the West German government and many professional testimonials from around the world. By then almost the entire Jewish community in Alexandria and the rest of Egypt had been driven out by the regime. Broken by his experiences in prison, Katz lived out the remainder of his life quietly in Switzerland and died while on a visit to Athens in 1969 at the age of 71.
