= Zabrze =

City in Silesian Voivodeship, Poland

Zabrze Zŏbrze (Silesian)
- City county
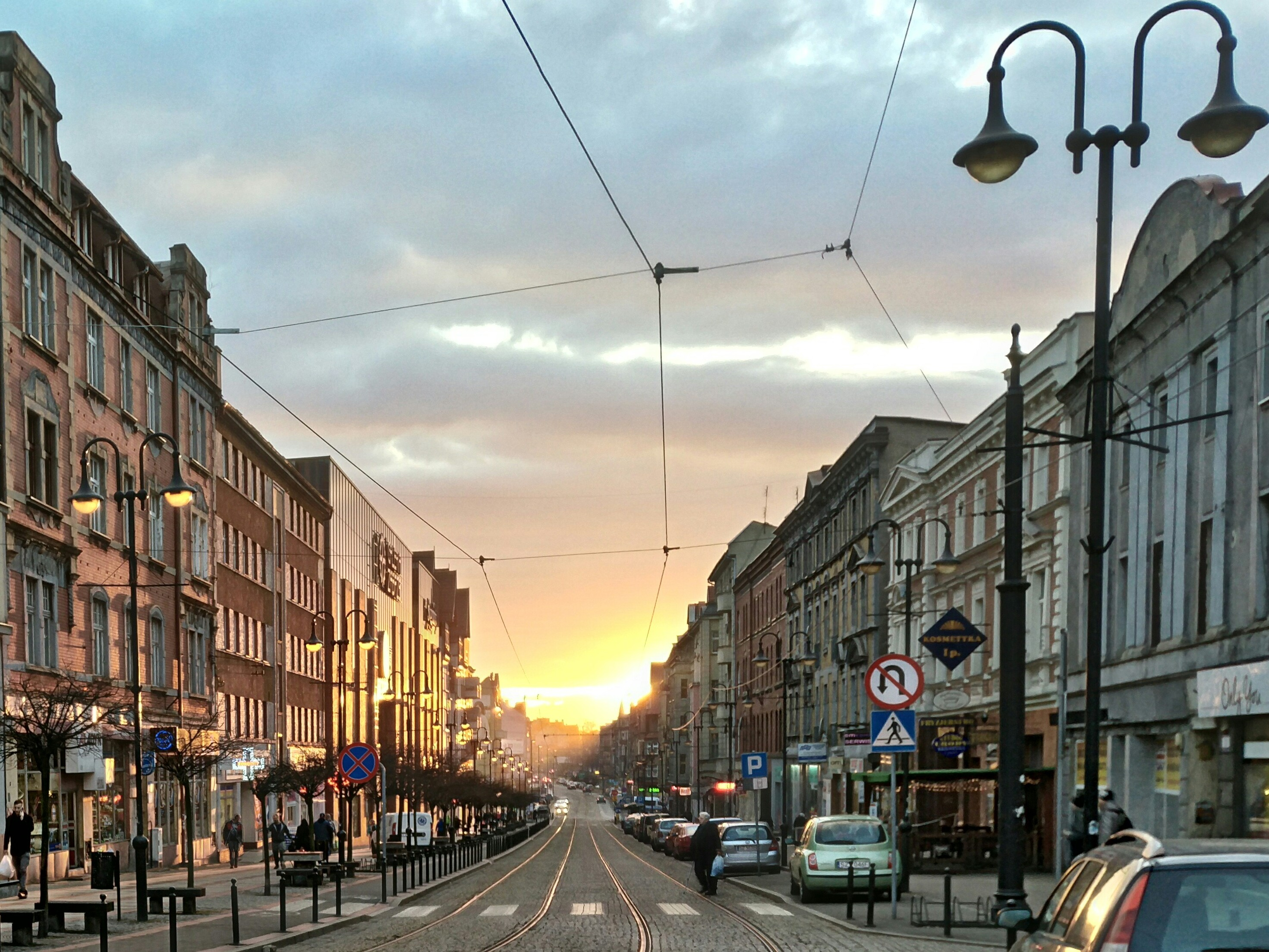
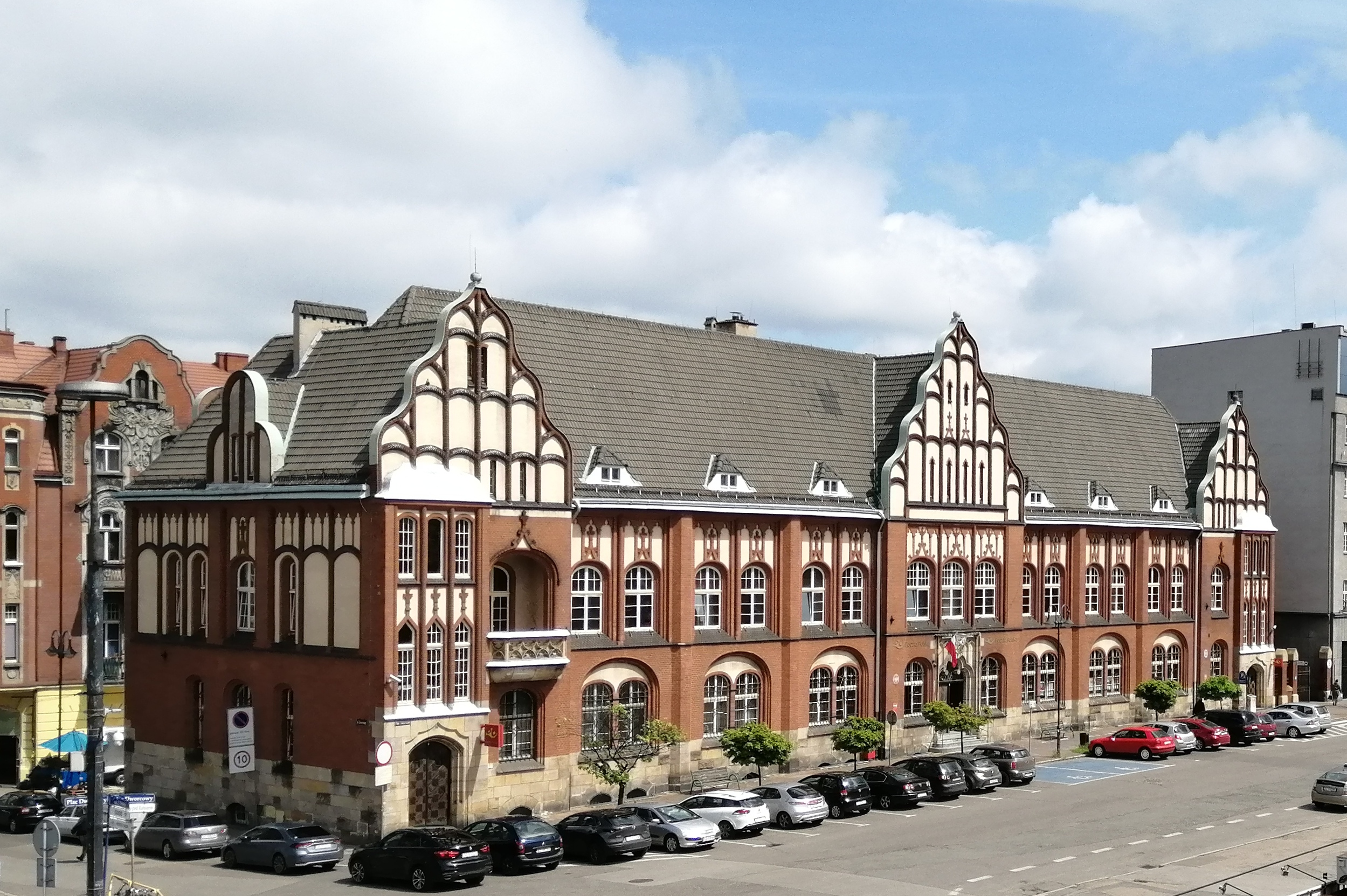
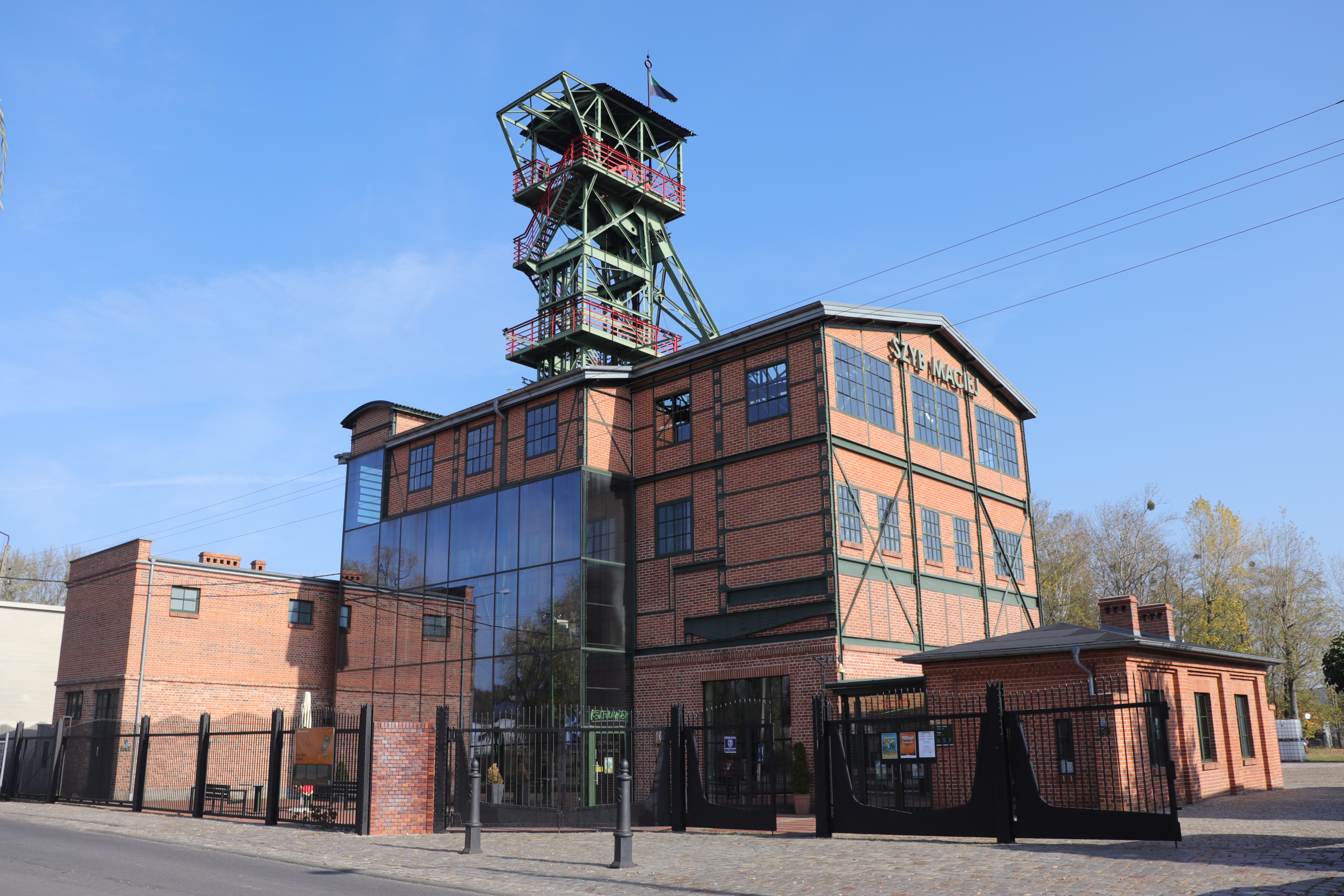
- Wolności Street Main post office Maciej mine shaft

- Flag Coat of arms

- Location within Poland
- Coordinates: 50°18′09″N 18°46′41″E
- Country: Poland
- Voivodeship: Silesian
- County: city county
- Established: thirteenth century
- City rights: 1922

Government
  - President: Kamil Żbikowski

Area
  - City county: 80.40 km^{2} (31.04 sq mi)

Population (31 December 2021)
  - City county: 152,461 ▼ (21st)
  - Density: 2,140/km^{2} (5,500/sq mi)
  - Urban: 2,746,000
  - Metro: 4,620,624
- Demonym(s): zabrzanin (male) zabrzanka (female) (pl)
- Time zone: UTC+1 (CET)
  - Summer (DST): UTC+2 (CEST)
- Postal code: 41–800 to 41–820
- Area code: +48 32
- Car plates: SZ
- Primary airport: Katowice Airport
- Website: https://www.um.zabrze.pl

Zabrze ([ˈzabʐɛ]; 1915–1945: Hindenburg; Silesian: Zŏbrze; Yiddish: זאַבזשע, romanized: Zabzhe) is an industrial city in Silesia in southern Poland, near Katowice. It lies in the western part of the Metropolis GZM, a metropolis with a population of around 2 million. It is in the Silesian Highlands, on the Bytomka River, a tributary of the Oder.

Zabrze is located in the Silesian Voivodeship. It is one of the cities composing the 2.7 million inhabitant conurbation referred to as the Katowice urban area, itself a major centre in the greater Katowice-Ostrava metropolitan area which is populated by just over five million people. The population of Zabrze as of December 2021 was 168,946, down from June 2009 when the population was 188,122. Zabrze is bordered by three other cities of the metropolitan area: Gliwice, Bytom and Ruda Śląska. The city is particularly known as the home of Górnik Zabrze, one of the most accomplished Polish football clubs. The local historic coal mine complex is listed as a Historic Monument of Poland as one of the most valuable of its kind in Poland.

== History ==
=== Early history ===
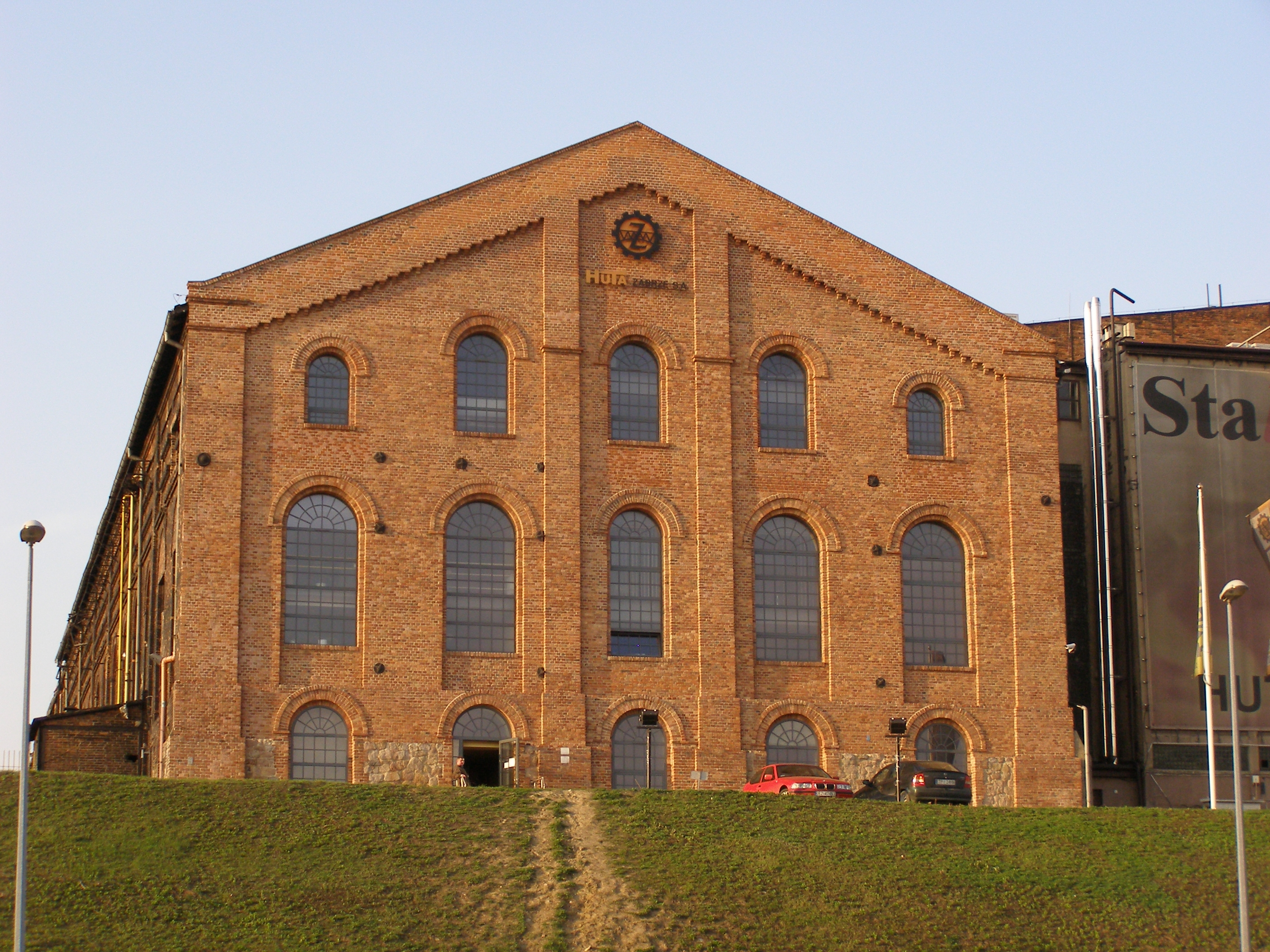
A historic metallurgical building in Zabrze

Biskupice, which is now a subdivision of Zabrze, was first mentioned in 1243 as Biscupici dicitur cirka Bitom. Zabrze (or Old Zabrze) was mentioned in 1295–1305 as Sadbre sive Cunczindorf (German for Konrad/Kunze's village; sive = "or"). According to historical sources, mining in Zabrze dates back to the 13th century. The present-day districts of Mikulczyce and Rokitnica were locations of motte-and-bailey castles from the 13th-15th century, which are now archaeological sites. In the 1970s, archaeologists discovered an Epipalaeolithic flintwork and flint tools from the Mesolithic at the Mikulczyce archaeological site. In the Late Middle Ages, the local Silesian Piast dukes invited German settlers into the territory, resulting in increasing German settlement. The settlement was part of the Silesian duchies of fragmented Poland. Zabrze became part of the Habsburg monarchy in 1526. In 1645, along with the Duchy of Opole, Zabrze returned to Polish rule under the House of Vasa, in 1666 it fell back to the Habsburgs, and was later annexed by the Kingdom of Prussia during the Silesian Wars. In 1774, the Dorotheendorf settlement was founded.

=== Industrial growth ===
In 1791, a coking coal seam was discovered in Zabrze, and then its first coking coal mine was opened. In the 19th century, new coal mines, steelworks, factories and a power plant were created. A road connecting Gliwice and Chorzów and a railway connecting Opole and Świętochłowice were led through Zabrze.

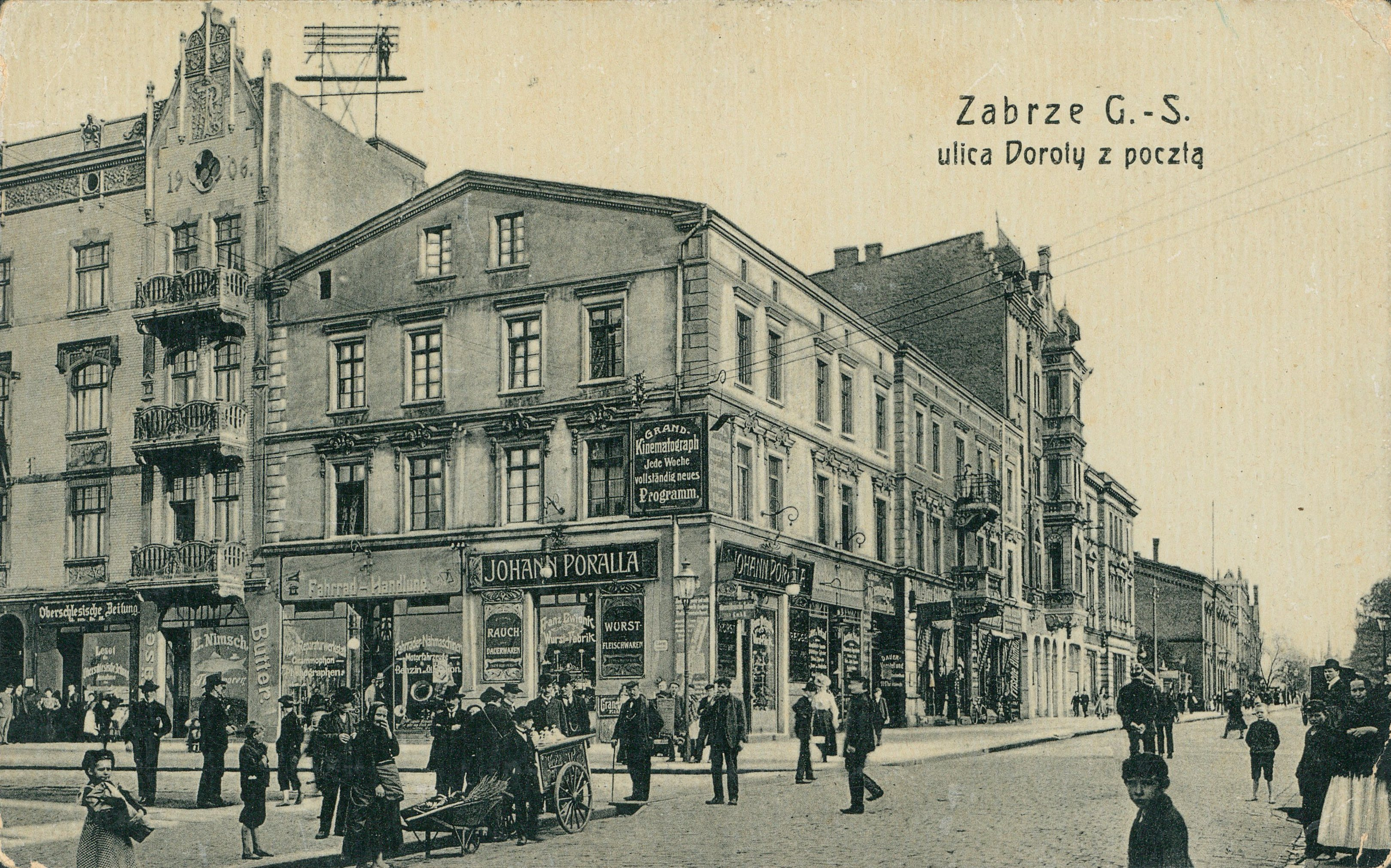
Zabrze in the 1910s

In 1905, the Zabrze commune was created from the former communes of Alt-Zabrze, Klein-Zabrze, and Dorotheendorf. In 1915, it was renamed Hindenburg in honour of Generalfeldmarschall Paul von Hindenburg, with the change approved by Emperor Wilhelm II on 21 February 1915. Until that time, it was among the few cities in Upper Silesia whose Polish name had been retained under German rule.

In 1904, the "Sokół" Polish Gymnastic Society was established in Zabrze as both a sporting and patriotic organization promoting Polish national identity. It was dissolved by Prussian authorities in 1911 but reactivated twice, in 1913 and 1918. Members of the organization later took an active role in the Upper Silesia plebiscite campaign and in the Silesian uprisings.

=== Interwar period ===
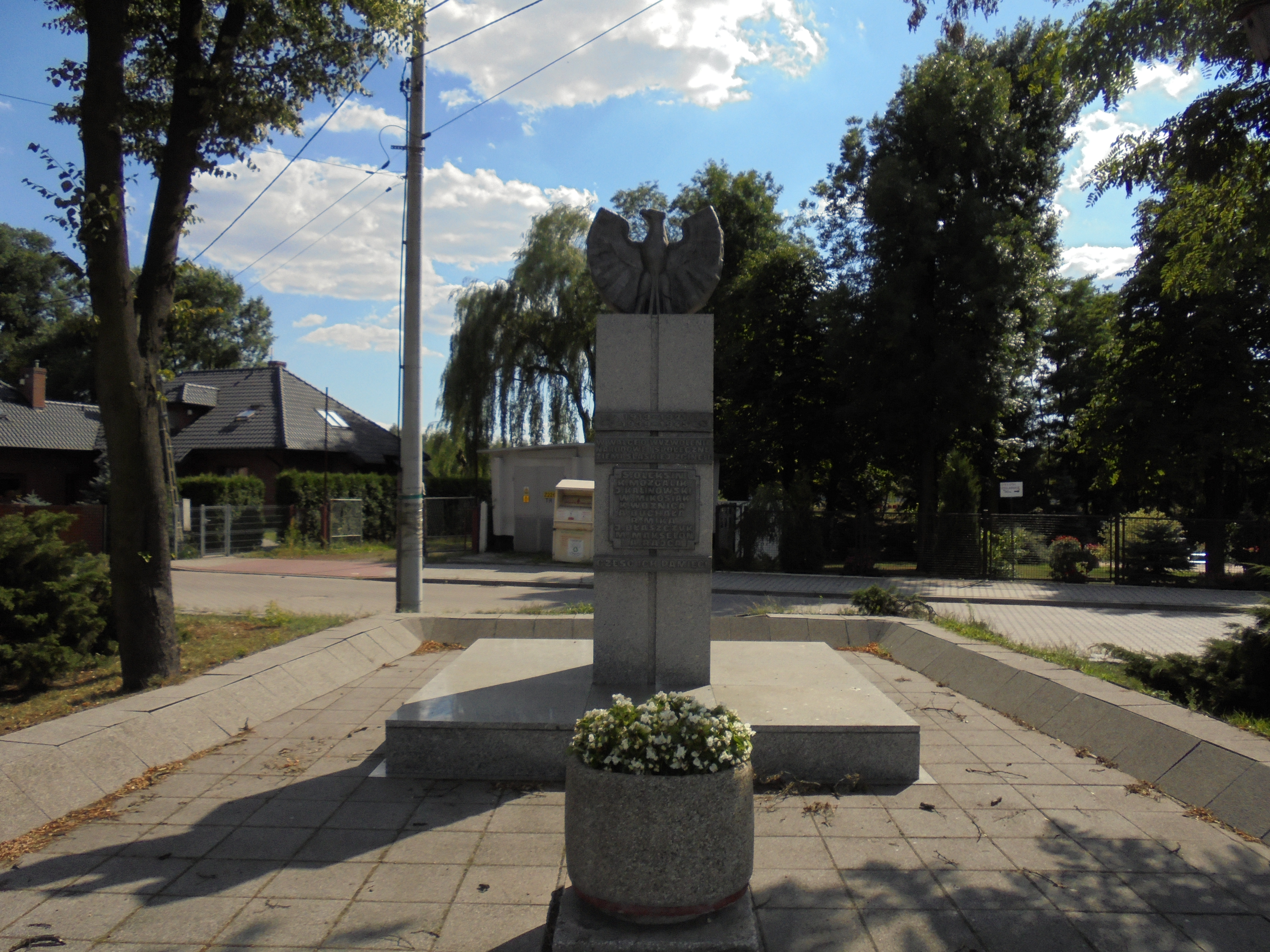
A monument commemorating the fallen in the fight for the liberation of Silesia in the Silesian uprisings and World War II

During the plebiscite held after World War I, 21,233 inhabitants (58.4%) in Hindenburg voted to remain in Germany, while 14,837 (40.8%) voted for incorporation to Poland, which had just regained its independence. The present-day northern and southern districts have voted in favor of returning to Poland. In the present-day northern districts of Grzybowice, Rokitnica, Mikulczyce 86.7%, 80.7%, 73.0%, respectively, voted for Poland, whereas in the present-day southern districts of Makoszowy, Kończyce and Pawłów 69.0%, 62.1% and 49.8% (relative majority), respectively, voted for Poland. In May 1921 the Third Silesian Uprising broke out and Hindenburg was captured by Polish insurgents, who held it until the end of the uprising. When Upper Silesia was divided between Poland and Germany in 1921, the Hindenburg commune remained in Germany, while the present-day districts of Kończyce, Makoszowy and Pawłów were reintegrated with Poland. It received its city charter in 1922. Just five years after receiving city rights Hindenburg became the biggest city in German-ruled western Upper Silesia and the second biggest city in German-ruled Silesia after Wrocław (then Breslau). Nevertheless, various Polish organizations still operated in the city in the interbellum, including a local branch of the Union of Poles in Germany, Polish libraries, sports clubs, credit unions, choirs, scout troops and an amateur theater. Polish newspaper Głos Ludu was published in the city. In a secret Sicherheitsdienst report from 1934, Zabrze was named one of the main centers of the Polish movement in western Upper Silesia. In terms of religion, most of the city's population adhered to the Catholic Church.

Historical population
Year	Pop.	±%
1950	128,005	—
1960	188,800	+47.5%
1970	197,300	+4.5%
1980	196,000	−0.7%
1990	201,400	+2.8%
2000	197,111	−2.1%
2010	186,913	−5.2%
2020	170,924	−8.6%

In the 1920s, the communists, Christian democrats and nationalists enjoyed the greatest support among the German population, while Poles supported Polish parties. In 1924 the Communist Party of Germany won the local elections and proposed changing the name of the city to Leninburg. In 1928, among the largest cities in western Upper Silesia, Polish parties received the most votes in Zabrze. In the March 1933 elections, most of the citizens voted for the Nazi Party, followed by Zentrum and the Communist Party. Nazi politician Max Fillusch became the city's mayor and remained in the position until 1945.

The anti-Polish organization Bund Deutscher Osten was very active in the city, it dealt with propaganda, indoctrination and espionage of the Polish community, as well as denouncing Poles to local authorities. When, the Barbórka (traditional holiday of miners) church services were organized separately for Poles and Germans in 1936, the Polish service enjoyed a greater attendance, however, due to Nazi oppression and propaganda, the attendance at Polish services in the 1930s gradually decreased, according to Bund Deutscher Osten. Polish activists were increasingly persecuted since 1937. People were urged to Germanise their names, Polish inscriptions were removed from tombstones. Some Polish priests were expelled from the city, both before and during World War II. As a result of German persecution the Jewish community dropped from 1,154 people in 1933 to 551 in 1939, and its remainder was deported to concentration camps in 1942. The town's synagogue, that had stood since 1872, was destroyed in the Kristallnacht pogroms of November 1938.

=== World War II ===
During World War II, the chiefs of the Polish police and further seven policemen of Kończyce, Makoszowy and Pawłów were murdered by the Russians in the Katyn massacre in 1940.

In 1941 the German authorities requisitioned church property and removed Polish symbols and memorabilia. Church bells were confiscated for war purposes in 1942. The Germans also established three forced labour subcamps of the Stalag VIII-B/344 prisoner-of-war camp in the city, two of which operated in the local coal mines, and one subcamp of Auschwitz III was also located there. Another subcamp of Stalag VIII-B/344 (E51) operated at a coal mine in the present-day Mikulczyce district.

On 24 January 1945, the city was captured by the Red Army. According to historian Andrzej Hanich, around 100 inhabitants were killed during and after the takeover. Some inhabitants were later deported to the Soviet Union, and others were resettled west in accordance with the Potsdam Agreement.

=== Contemporary history ===
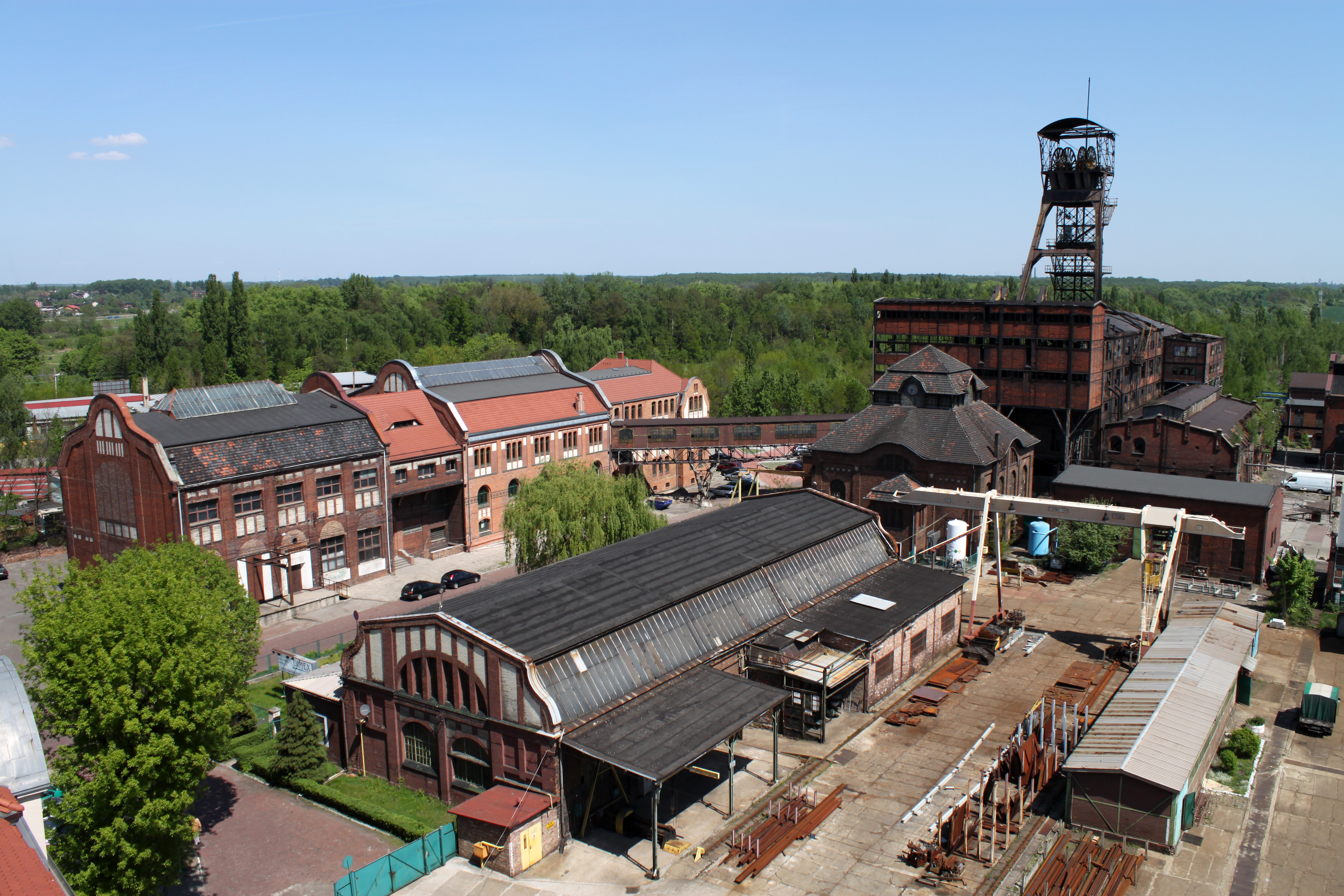
Ludwik coal mine, closed down in 1978

Following World War II, according to the Potsdam Agreement the city was handed over to Poland in 1945 and the town's name was changed to the historic Zabrze on 19 May 1945. The first post-war mayor of Zabrze was Paweł Dubiel, pre-war Polish activist and journalist in Upper Silesia, prisoner of the Dachau and Mauthausen concentration camps during the war. The pre-war Polish inhabitants of the region, who formed the majority of the city's population in 1948, were joined by Poles expelled from former eastern Poland annexed by the Soviet Union. Moreover, Polish settlers from the central part of Poland also settled in Zabrze.

The city limits were largely expanded in 1951, by including Mikulczyce, Rokitnica, Grzybowice, Makoszowy, Kończyce and Pawłów as new districts. New neighbourhoods were built from the 1950s to 1990s. In 1948, Górnik Zabrze football club was founded, which won its first Polish championship in 1957, and soon became the pride of the city as one of the most successful clubs in Poland. Zabrze was administratively part of the Katowice Voivodeship until 1998.

== Administrative division ==
Districts of Zabrze

On 17 September 2012, the Zabrze city council decided on a new administrative division of the city. Zabrze was subsequently divided into 15 districts and 3 housing estates.

1. Helenka
2. Grzybowice
3. Rokitnica
4. Mikulczyce
5. Młody Górnik estate
6. Mikołaj Kopernik estate
7. Biskupice
8. Maciejów
9. Tadeusz Kotarbiński estate
10. Centrum Północ
11. Centrum Południe
12. Guido
13. Zaborze Północ
14. Zaborze Południe
15. Pawłów
16. Kończyce
17. Makoszowy
18. Zandka

== Infrastructure ==
The Polish north–south A1 and east–west A4 motorways, which are parts of the European routes E75 and E40, respectively, run through Zabrze, and their junction is located just outside the city limits. In addition the Polish National roads 78, 88 and 94 also run through the city. The Drogowa Trasa Srednicowa leads through the town.

== Culture and sights ==
Among the cultural institutions of the town are the Zabrze Philharmonic and Teatr Nowy ("New Theatre"). Dom Muzyki i Tańca ("House of Music and Dance") indoor arena is located in Zabrze. The local museums are the Coal Mining Museum, the Municipal Museum, the Military Technology Museum and the Museum of Historic Vehicles. The Maciej mine shaft and the Main Key Hereditary Adit (Główna Kluczowa Sztolnia Dziedziczna), one of the longest such structures in Europe, are open for tourists. The historic coal mines of Zabrze are listed as a Historic Monument of Poland.

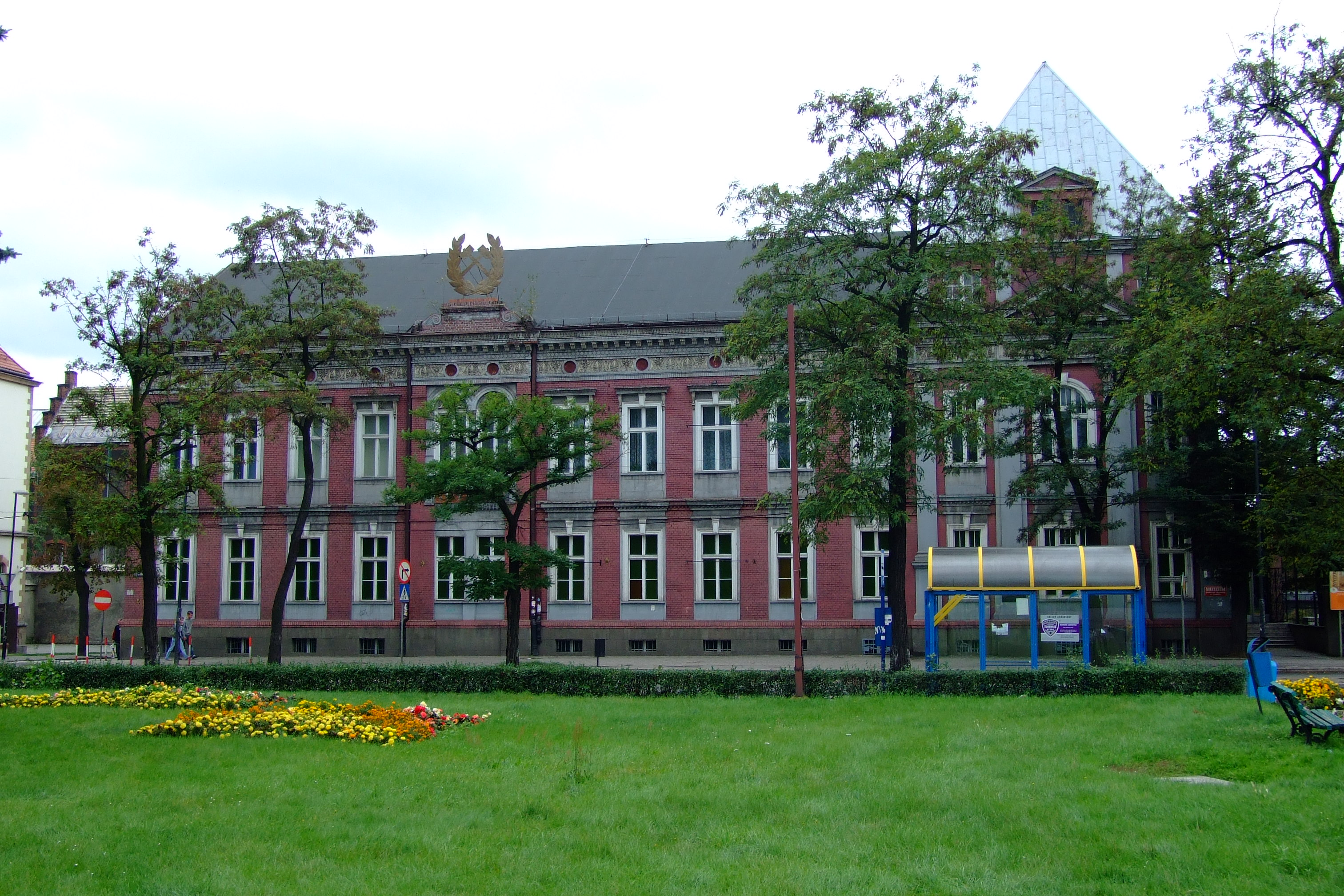
Coal Mining Museum

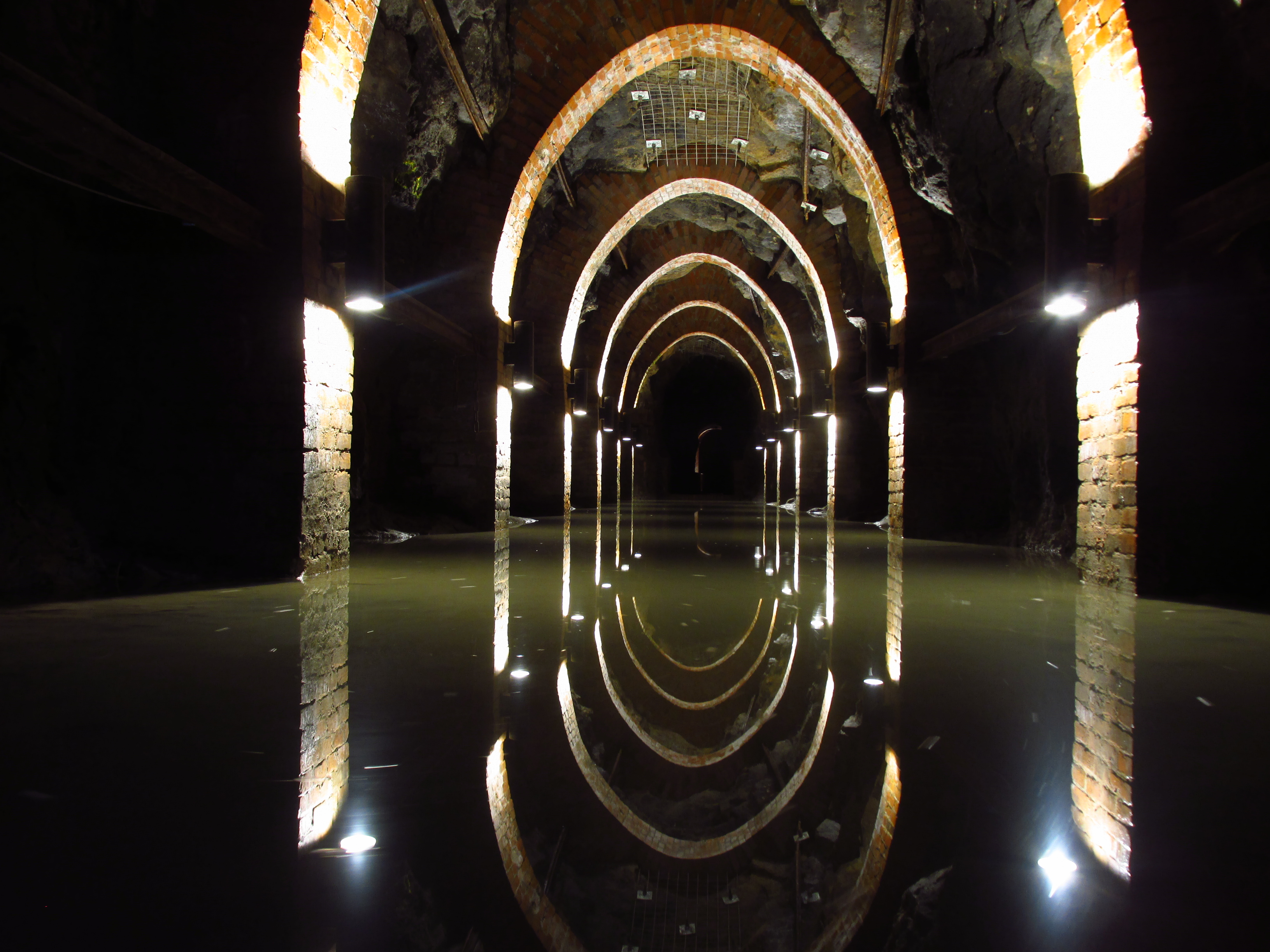
Main Key Adit

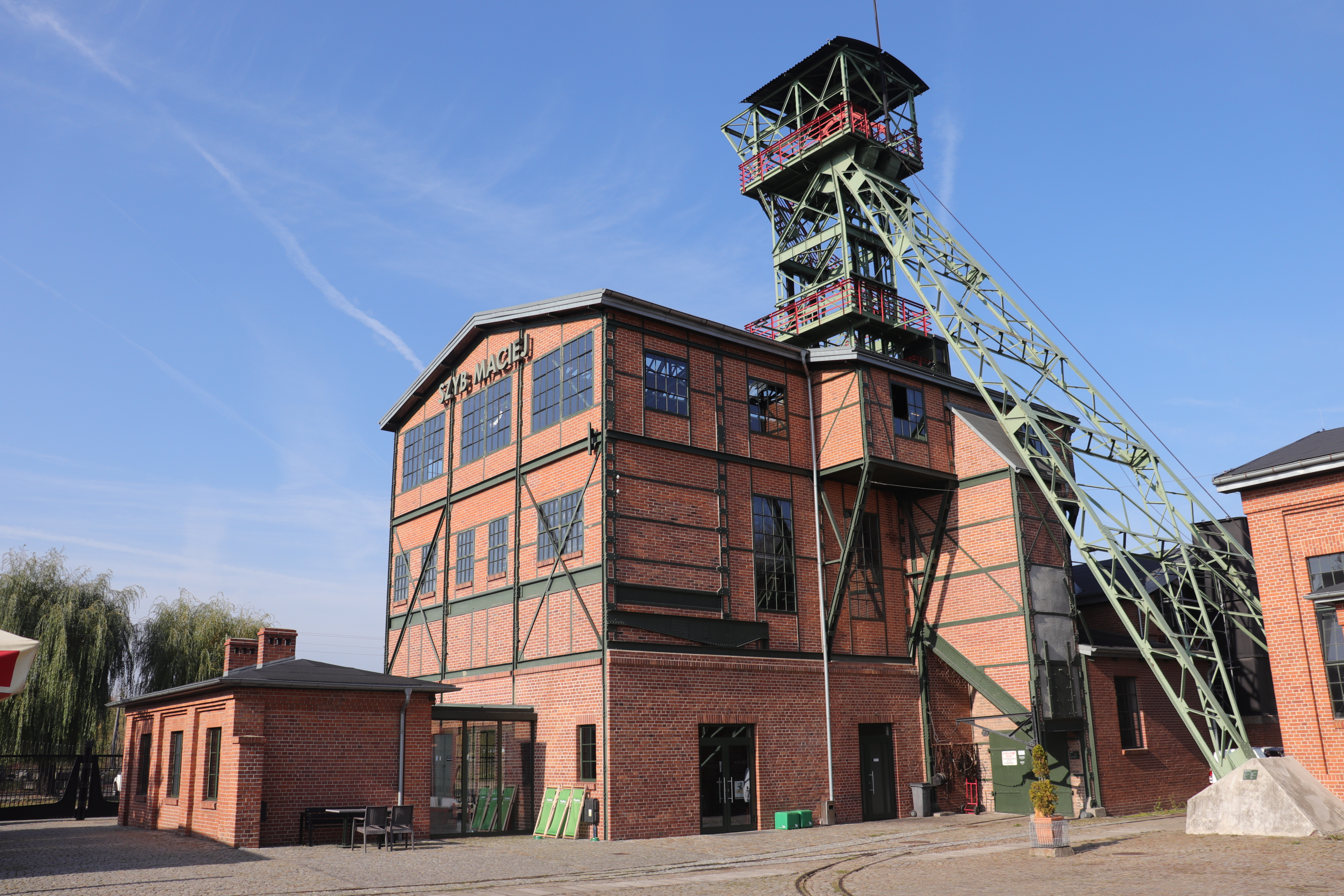
Maciej mine shaft

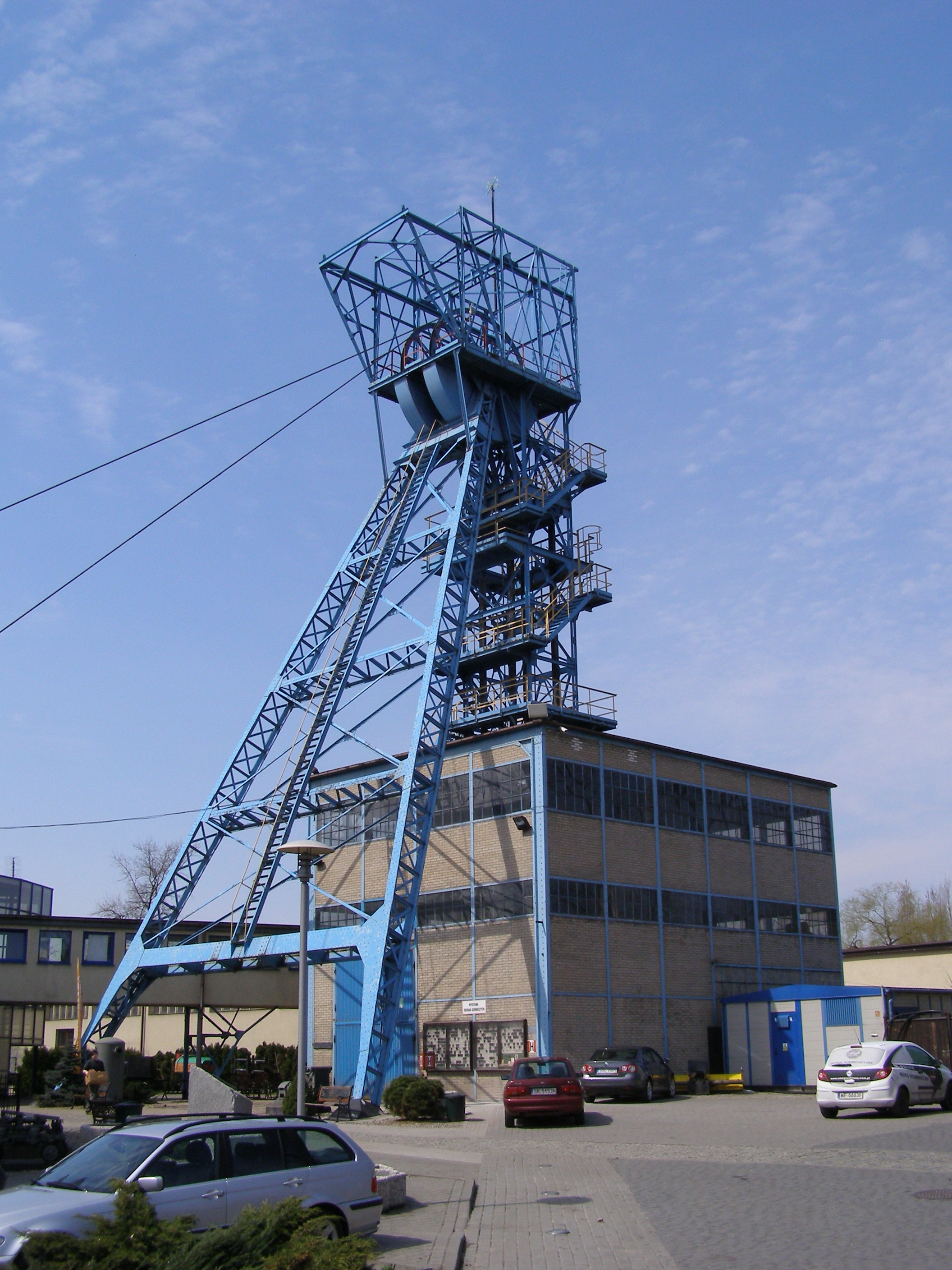
Guido mine shaft

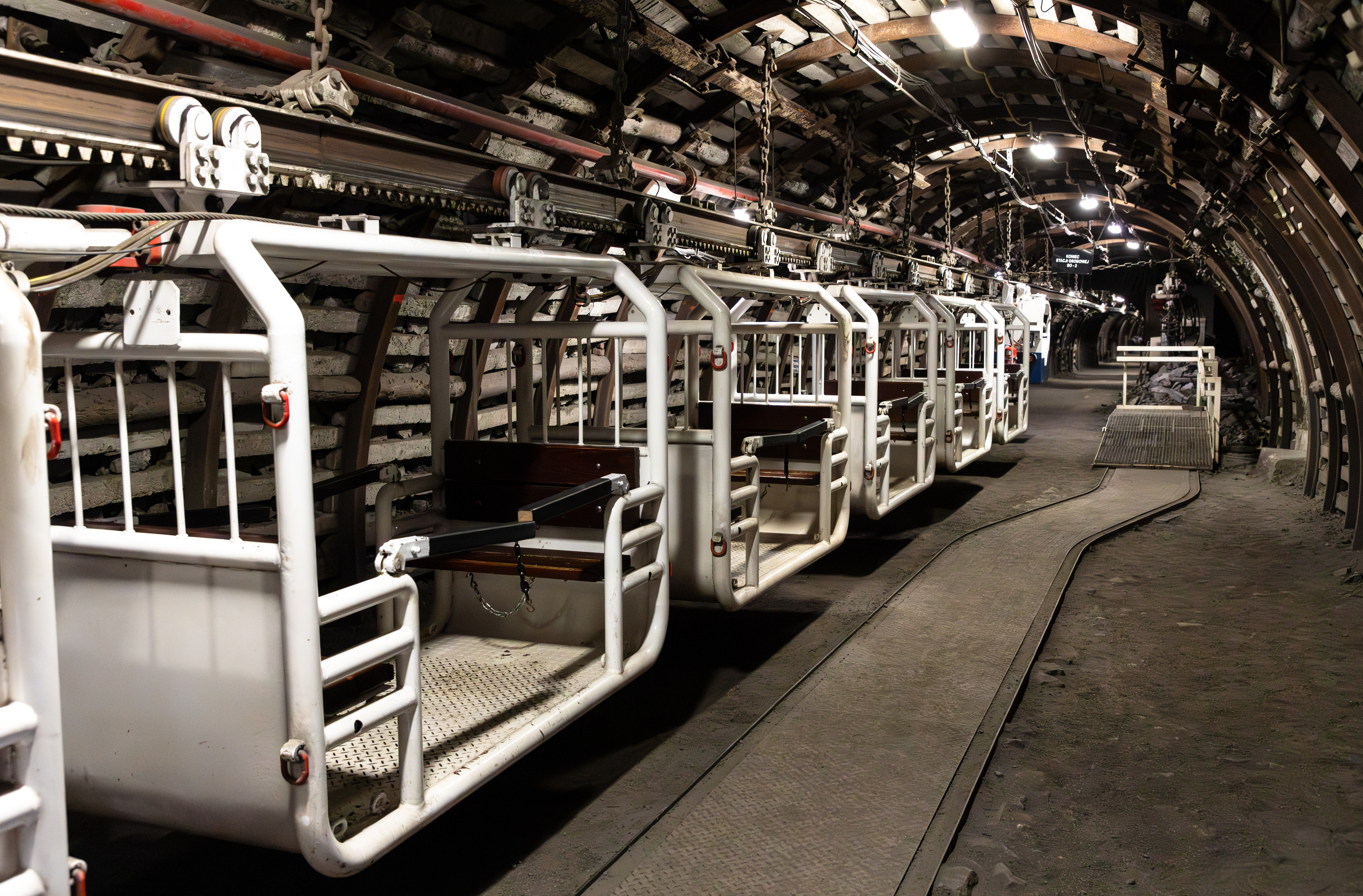
Guido mine

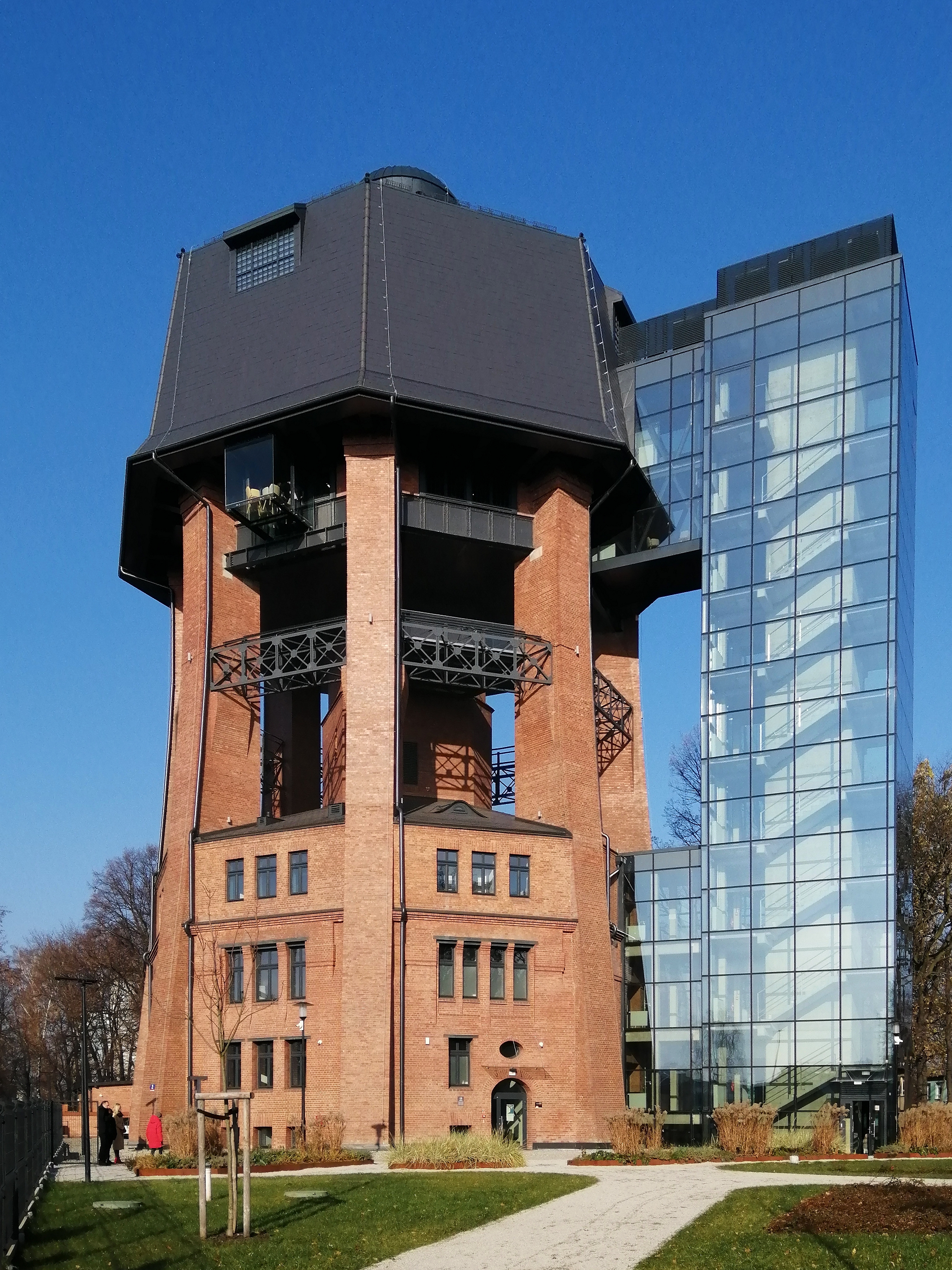
Water tower at Zamoyskiego Street

Among the historical architecture there are many industrial facilities, as well as various churches, houses, public buildings, etc. Important monuments of architecture were built the Expressionist and modernist styles, e.g. the Admiralspalast Hotel (1924–1927), housing estate on Słowiański Square (1927–1928) and St Joseph's Church (1930–1931, designed by Dominikus Böhm). There are also numerous monuments referring to the history of the city, especially the Silesian uprisings fought here and World War II.

There is also a botanical garden and several parks in Zabrze.

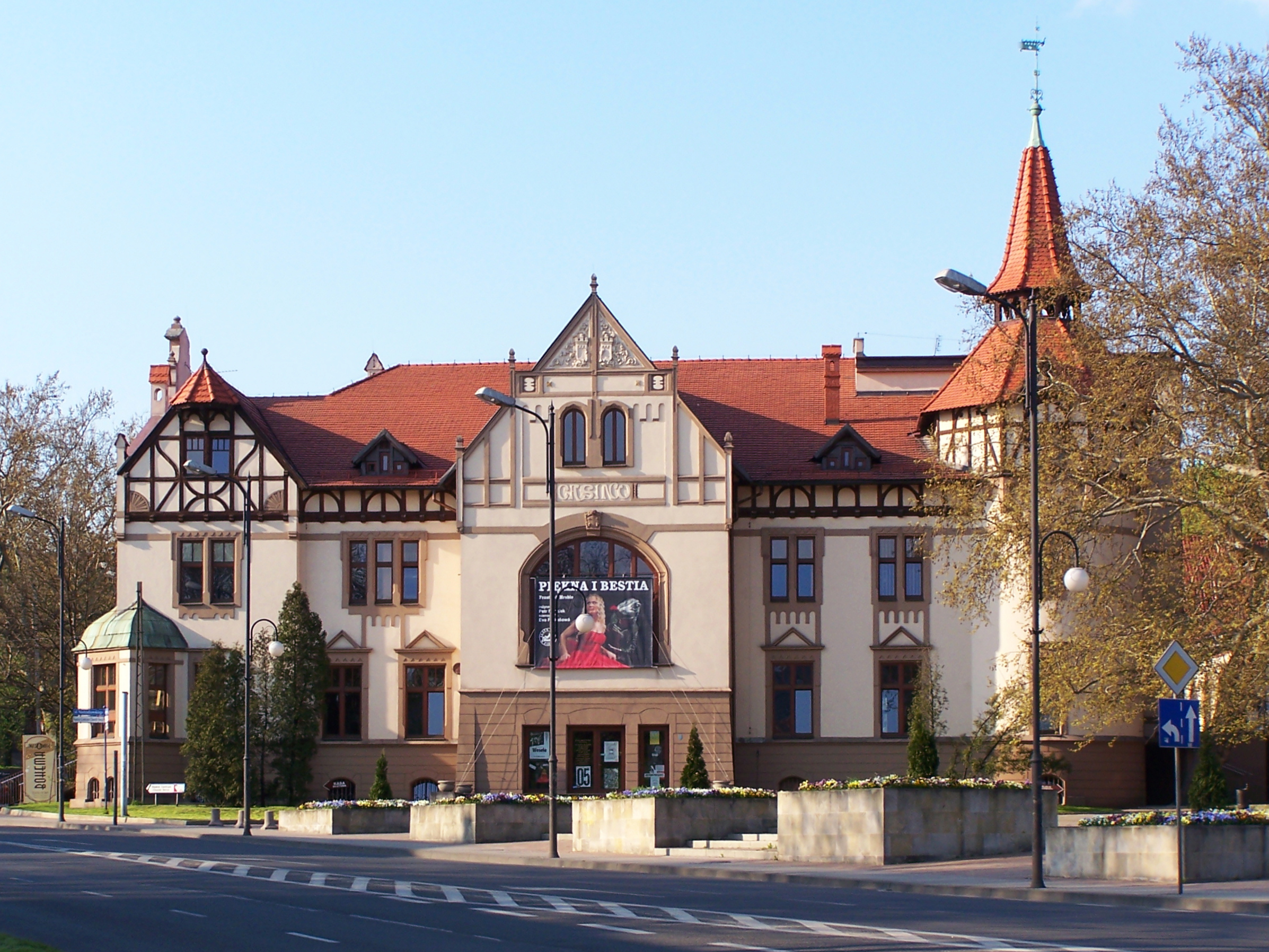
New Theatre

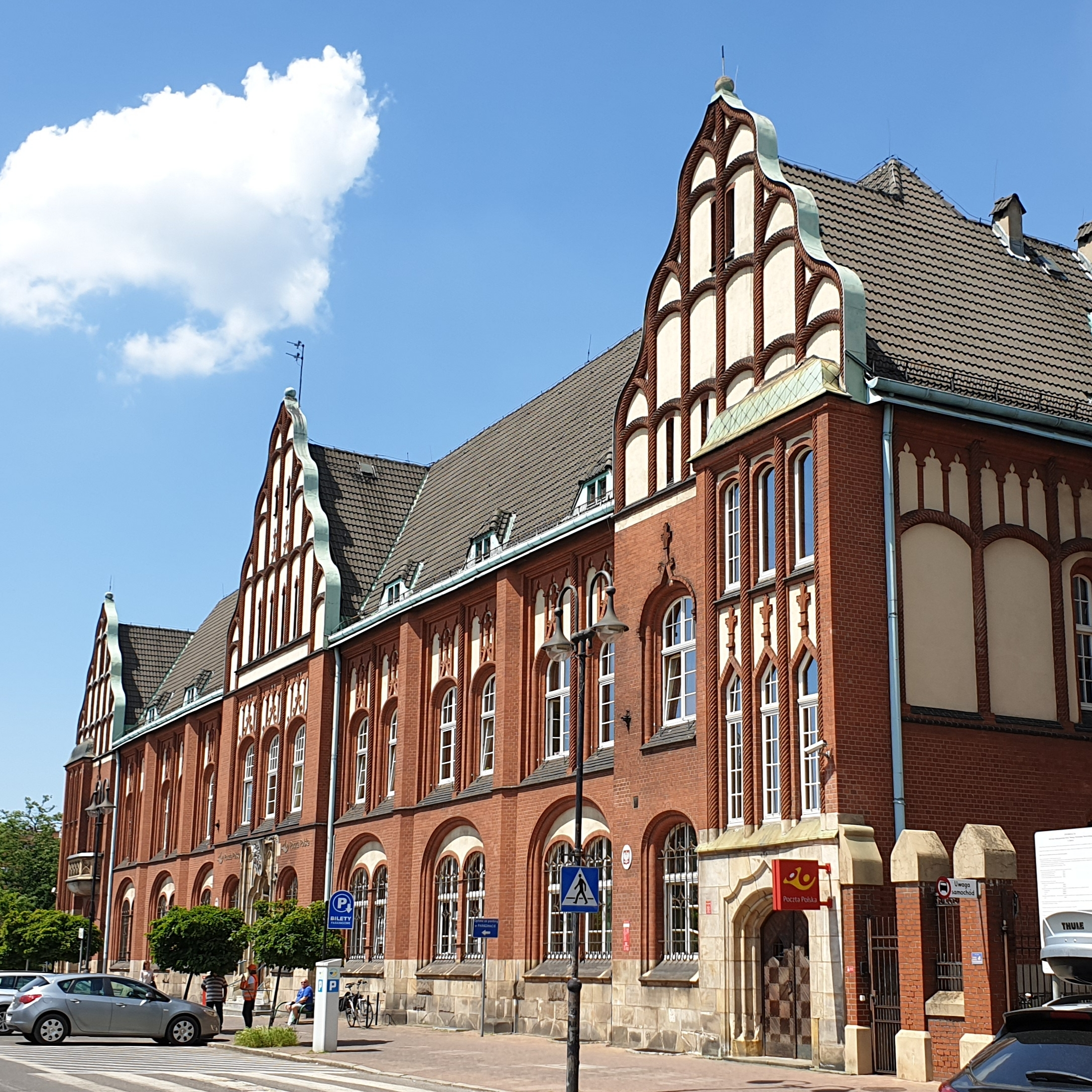
Main post office

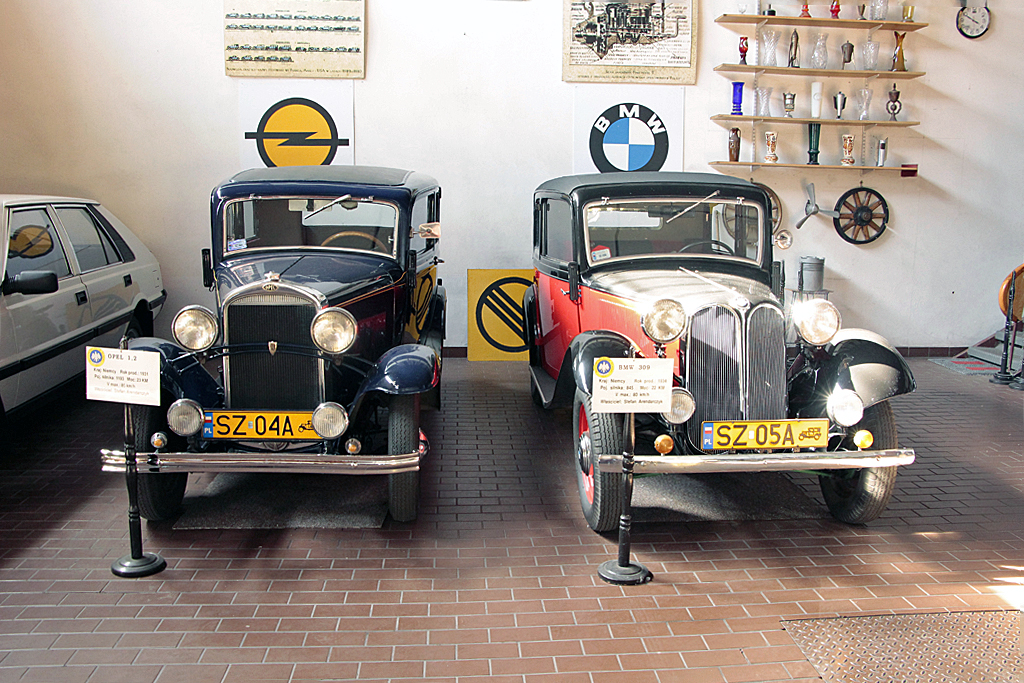
Museum of Historic Vehicles

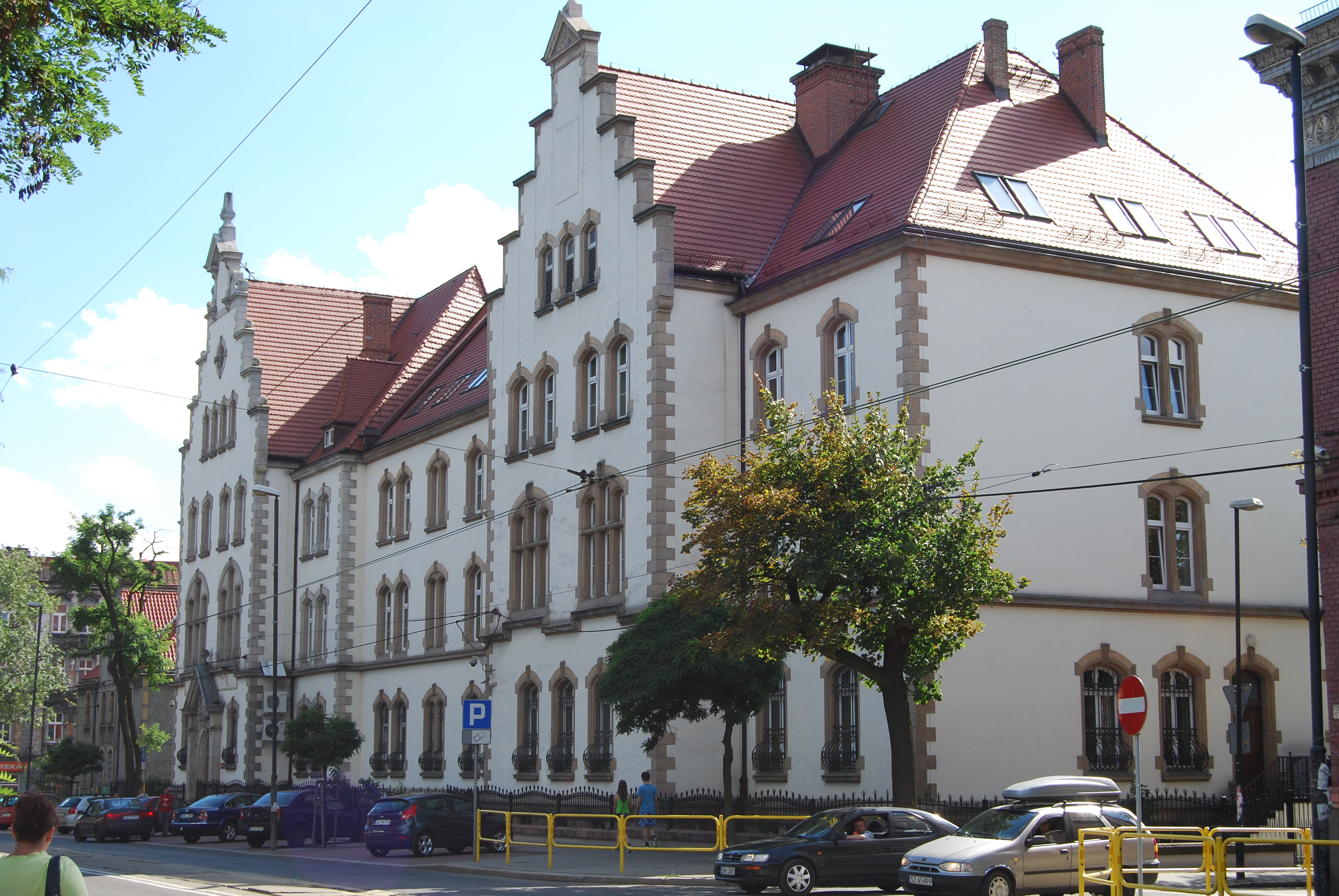
Regional Court

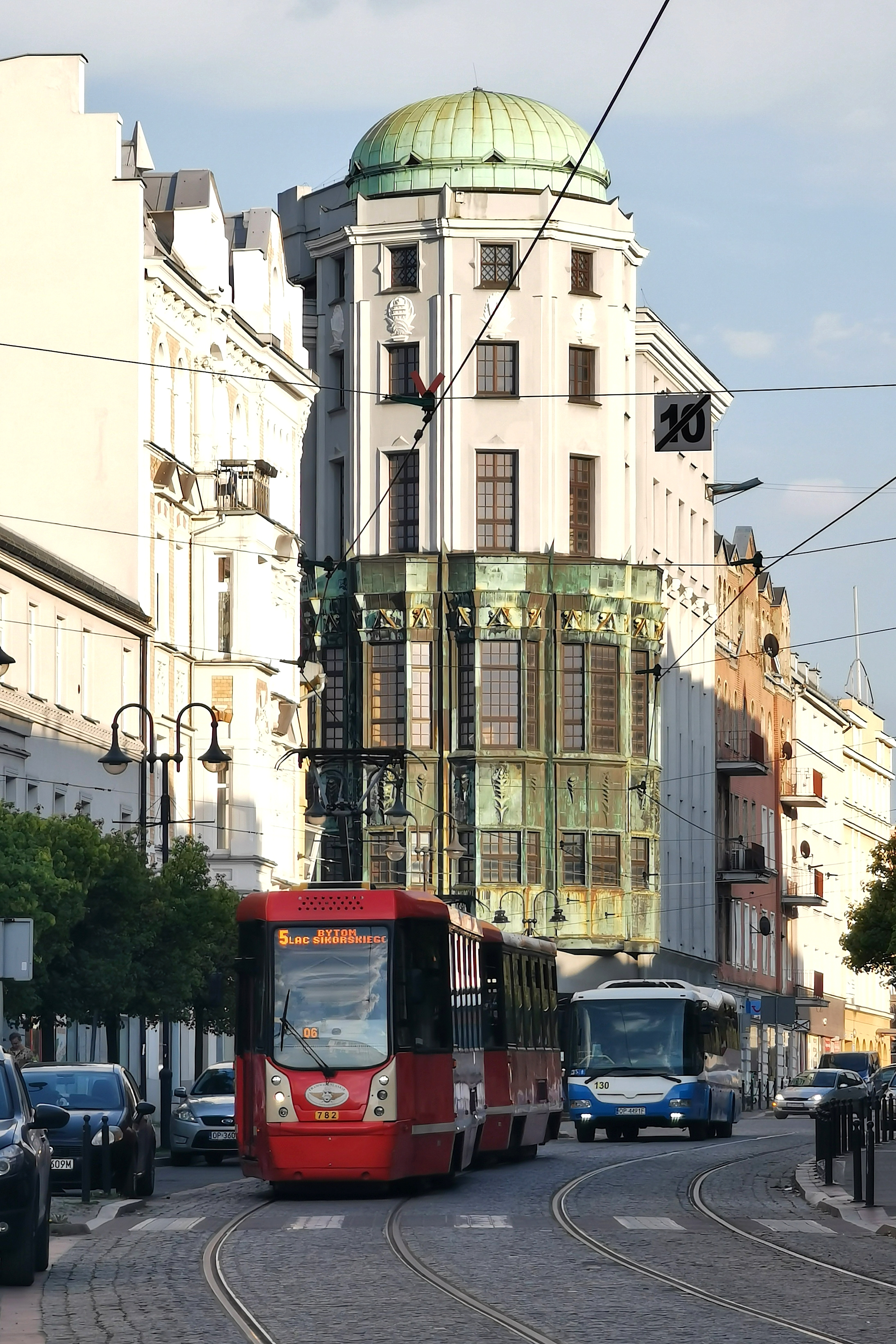
Admiralspalast Hotel

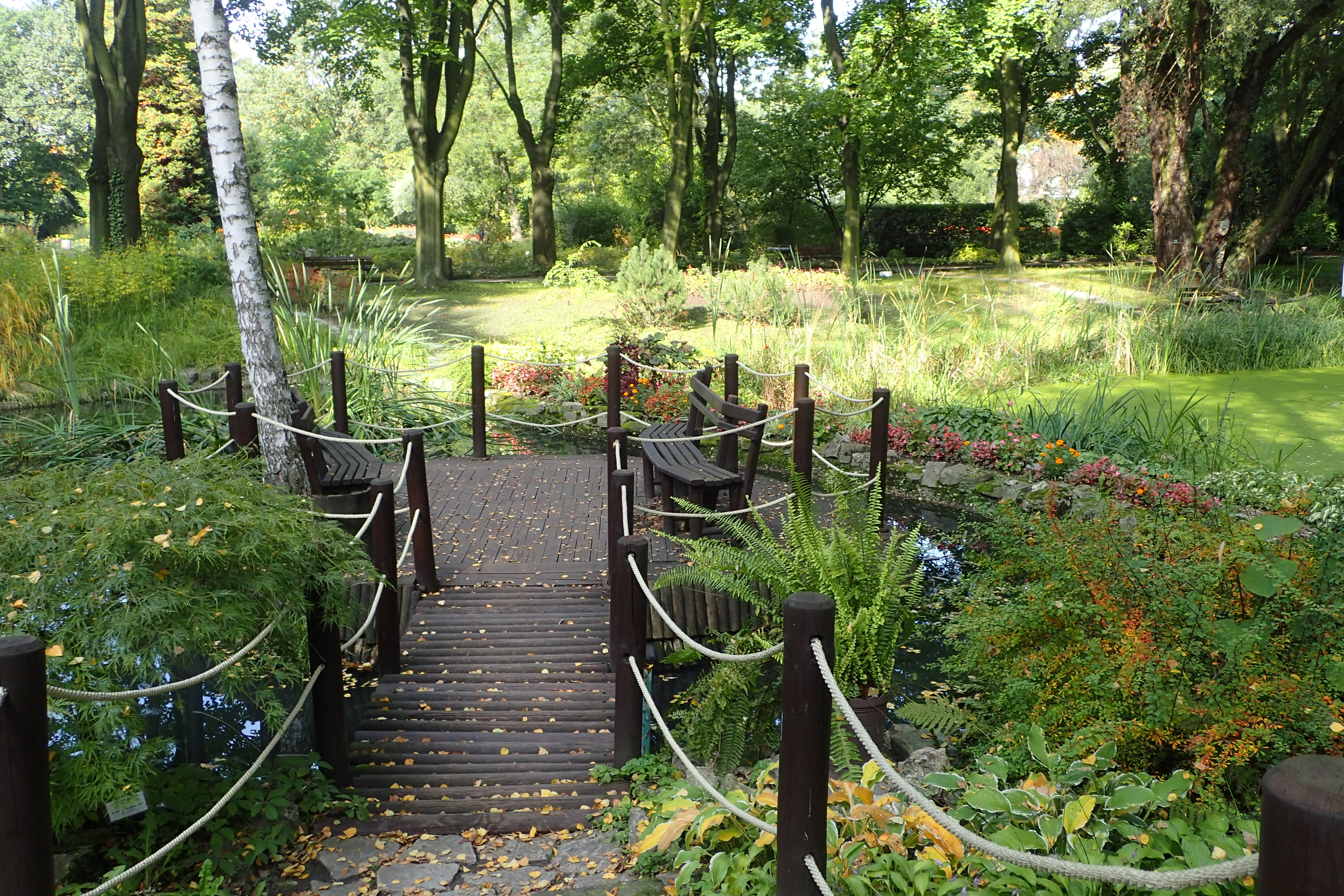
Botanical garden

== Politics ==
Selected historic churches

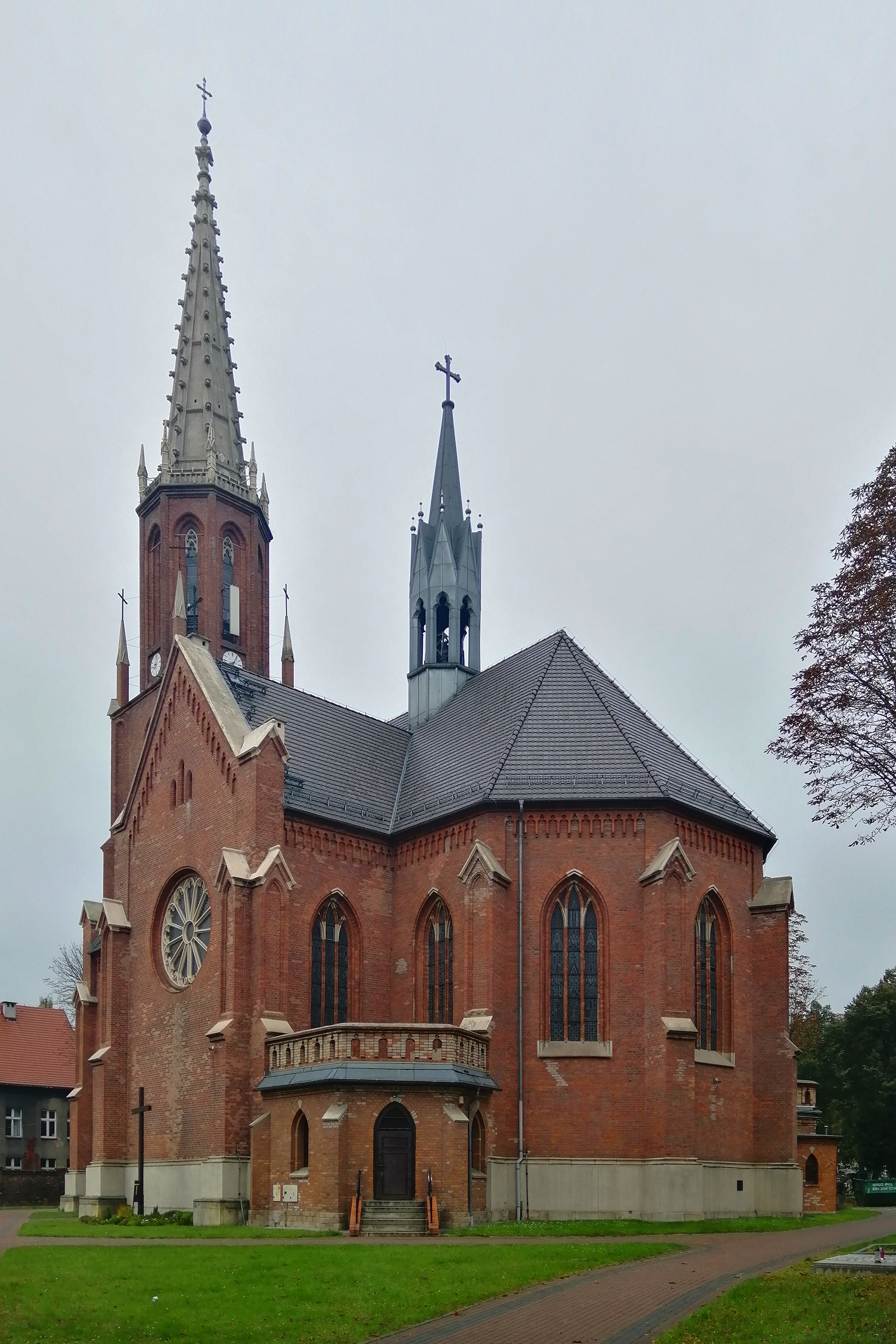
St. John the Baptist

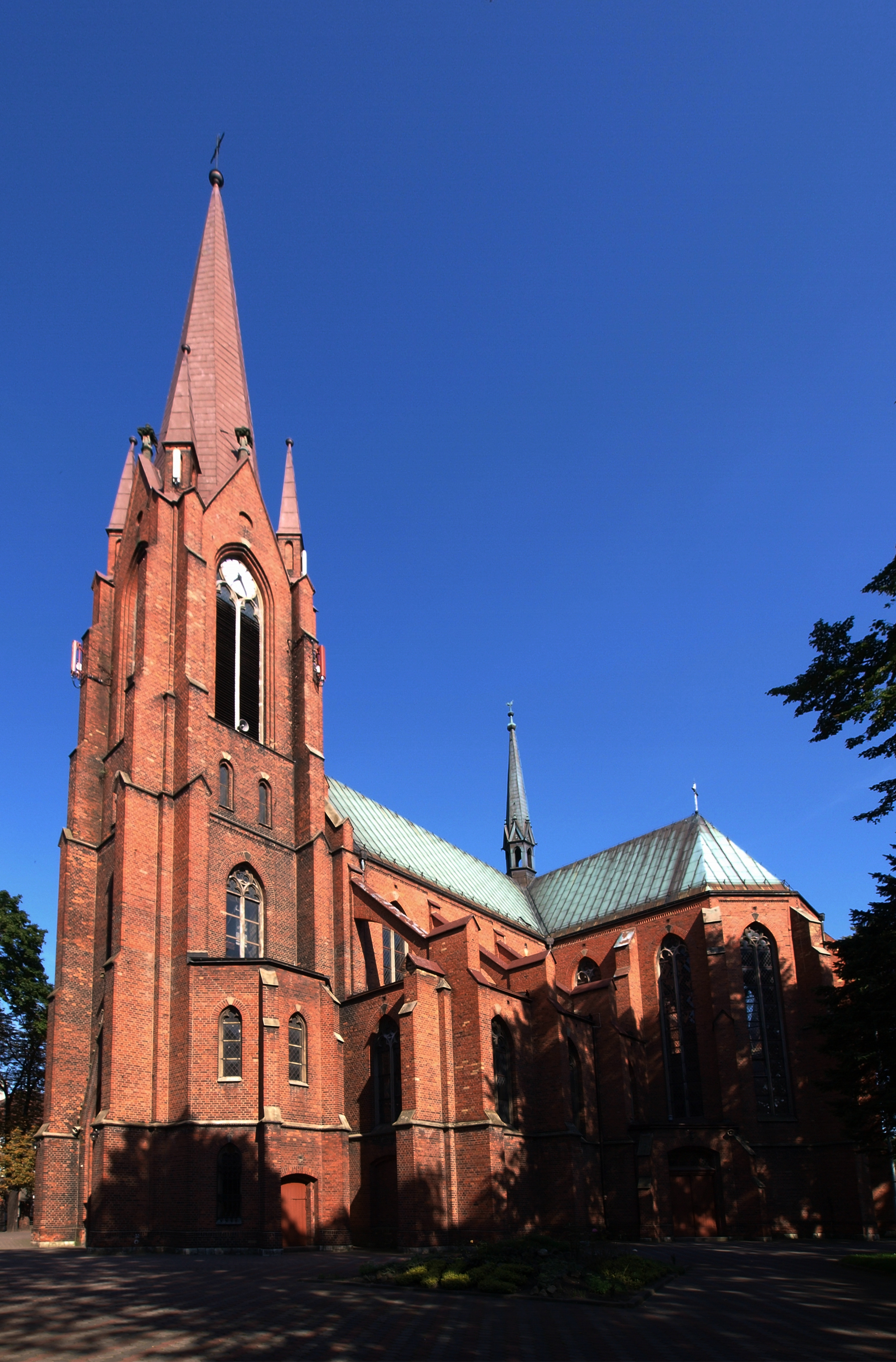
St. Lawrence

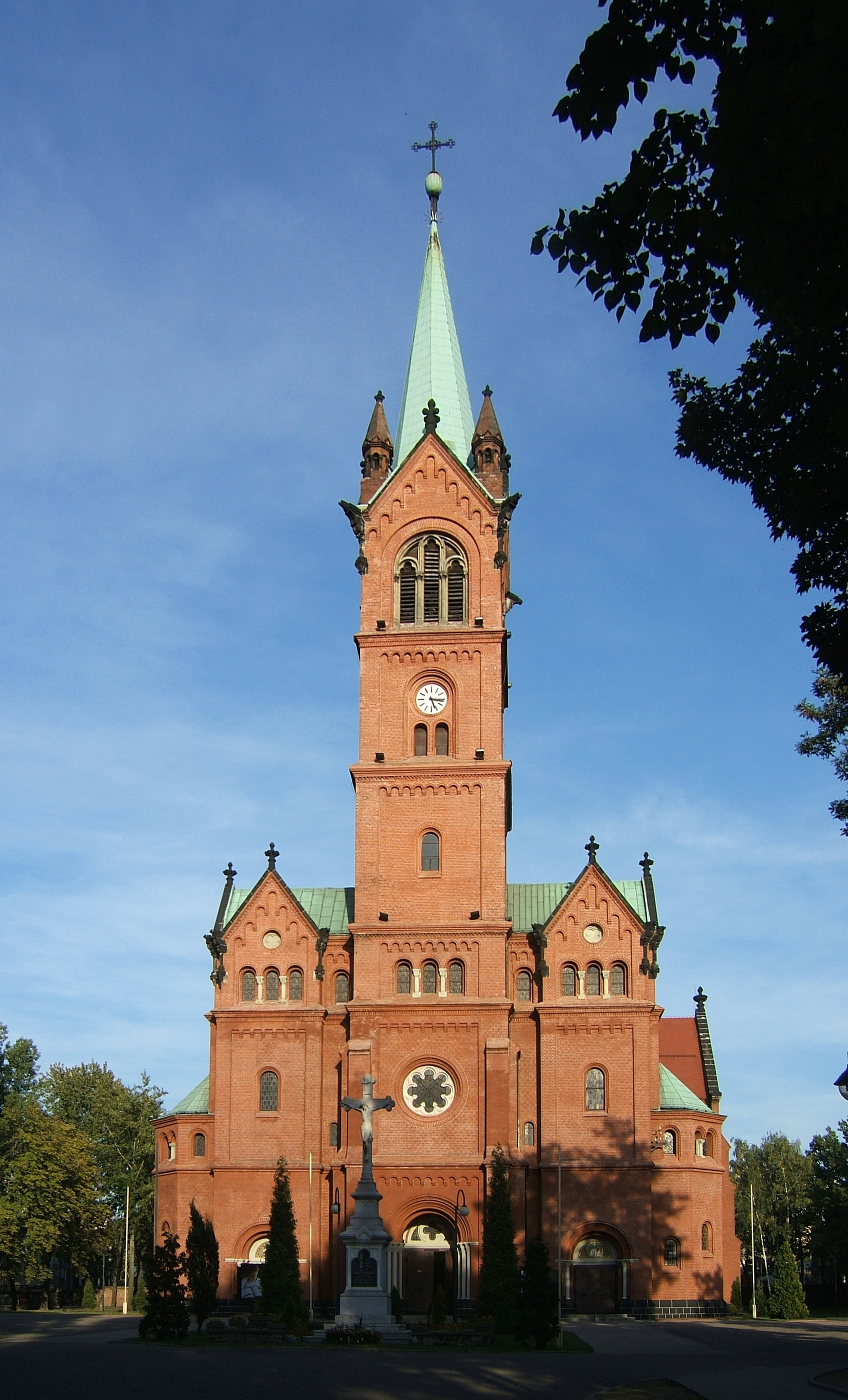
St. Anne

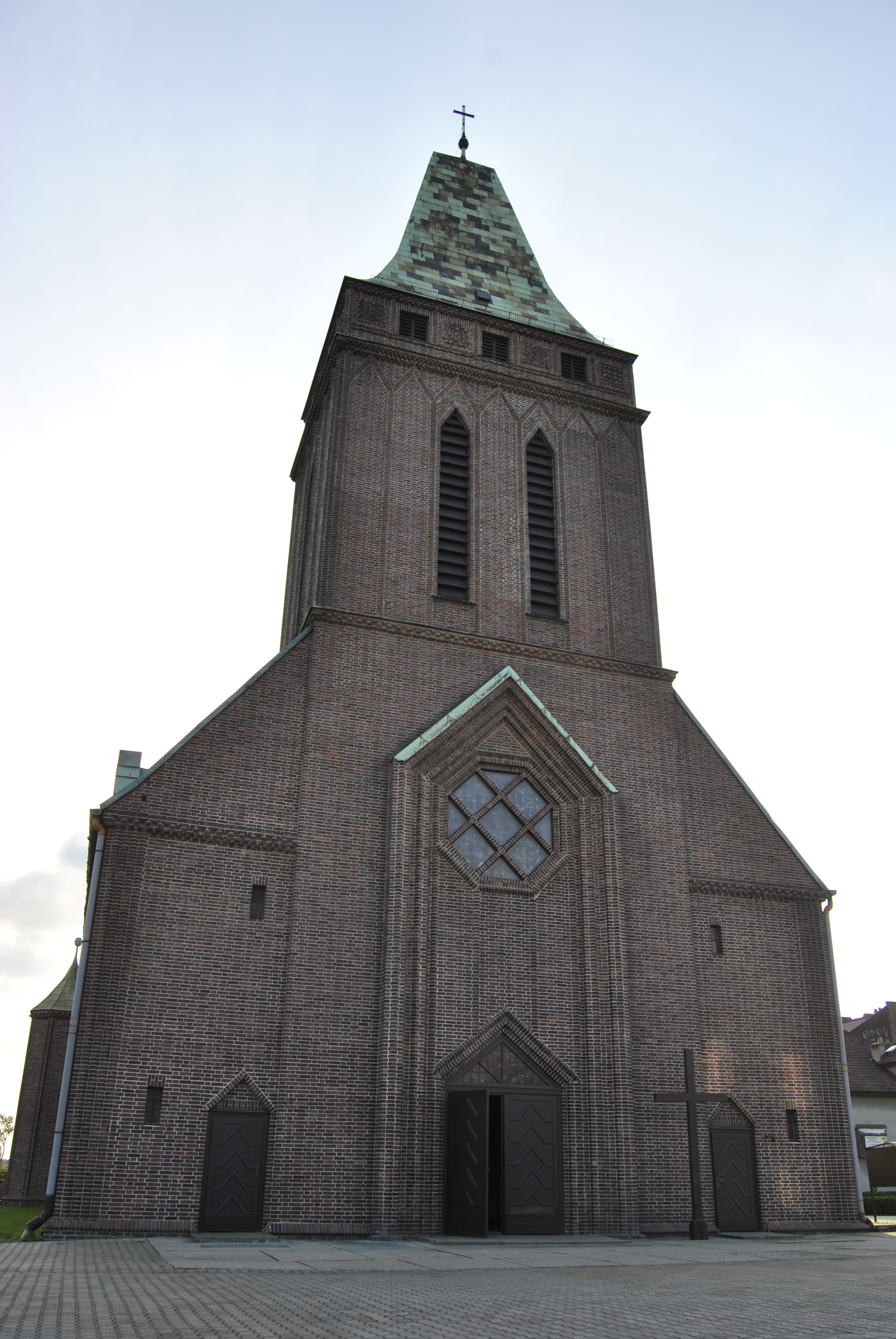
Assumption

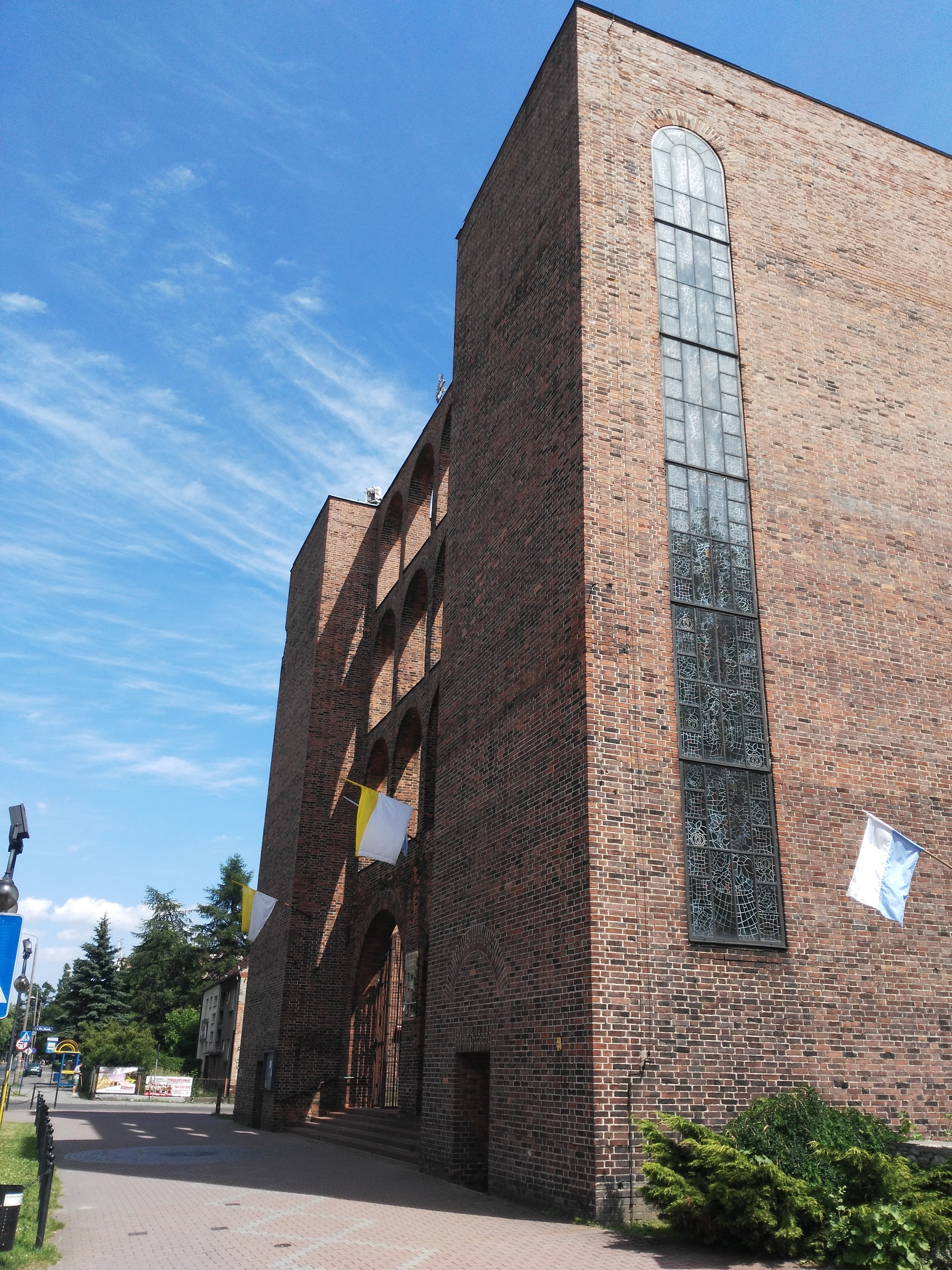
St. Joseph

Members of Parliament (Sejm) elected from Bytom/Gliwice/Zabrze constituency

- Chojnacki Jan, SLD-UP
- Dulias Stanisław, Samoobrona
- Gałażewski Andrzej, PO
- Janik Ewa, SLD-UP
- Kubica Józef, SLD-UP
- Martyniuk Wacław, SLD-UP
- Okoński Wiesław, SLD-UP
- Szarama Wojciech, PiS
- Szumilas Krystyna, PO
- Widuch Marek, SLD-UP

== Sports ==
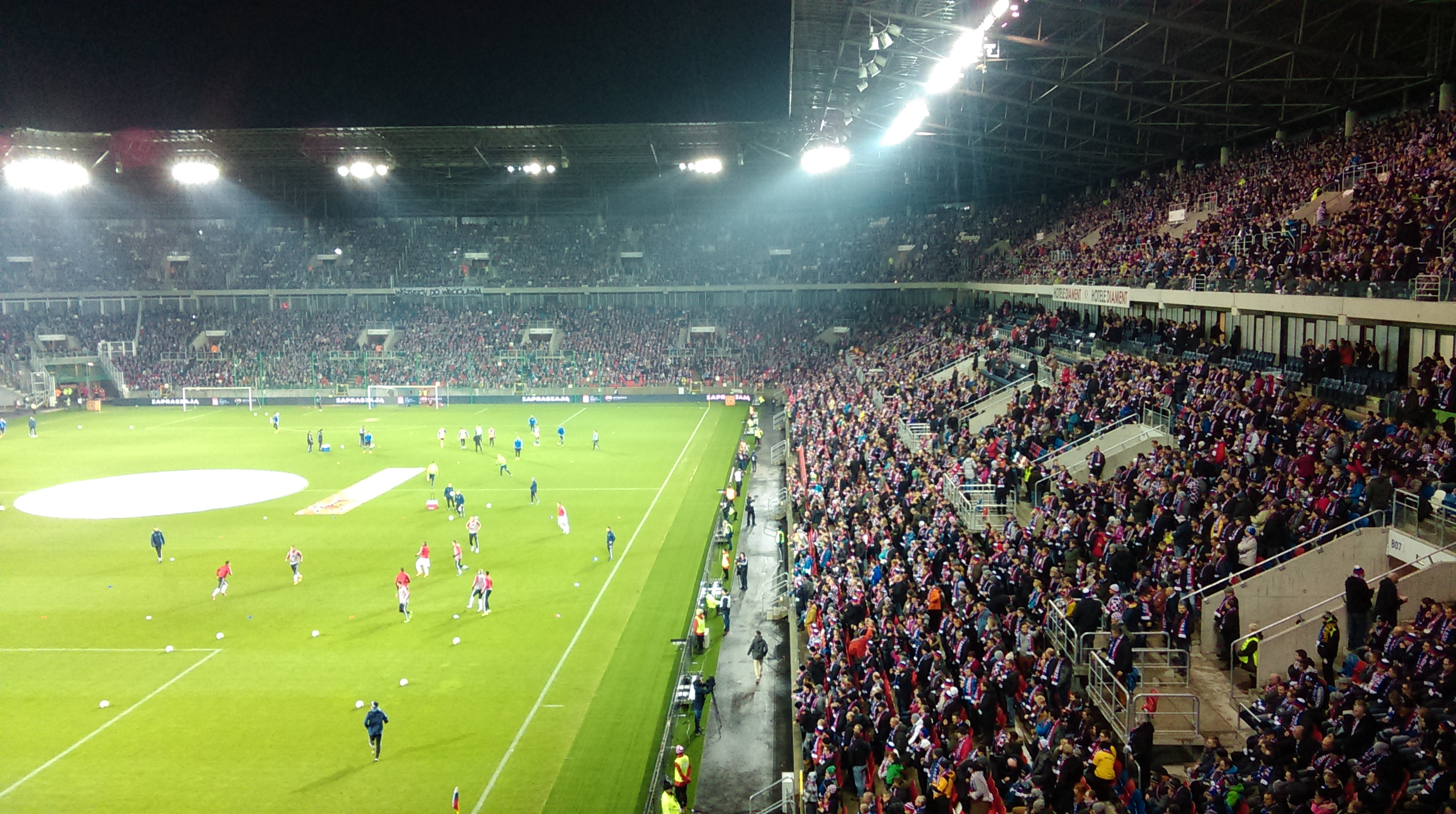
Ernest Pohl Stadium, home venue of Górnik Zabrze

The city's most renown sports team is Górnik Zabrze, one of the most accomplished Polish football clubs, 14 times Polish champions, 7 times Polish Cup winners, and 1969–70 European Cup Winners' Cup runners-up, as the only Polish team to reach the final stage of a major European football competition. Other popular team is NMC Górnik Zabrze, two times Polish men's handball champions and three times Polish Cup winners. Both teams compete in the national top leagues, the Ekstraklasa and Superliga respectively.

Many sportspeople were born in Zabrze, including footballers Jerzy Gorgoń, Łukasz Skorupski and Adam Bodzek, and pro ice hockey player of the National Hockey League, Wojtek Wolski.

== Economy ==
Like other towns in the Upper Silesian Industrial Region, Zabrze is an important manufacturing centre. Its industries have historically included coal mining and iron, wire, glass, and chemical production, as well as oil refining and the local Upper Silesia Brewery.

== Notable people ==
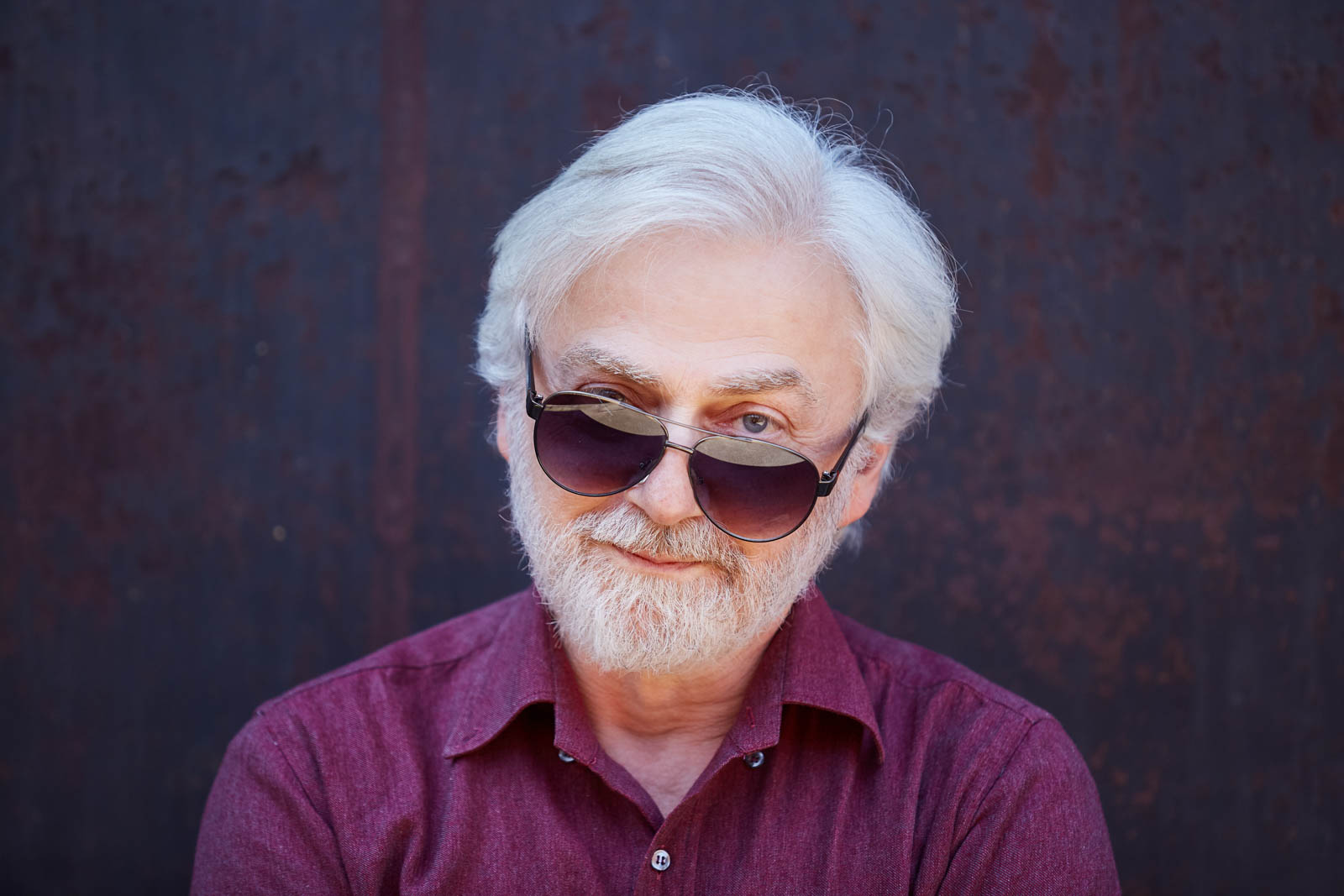
Krystian Zimerman

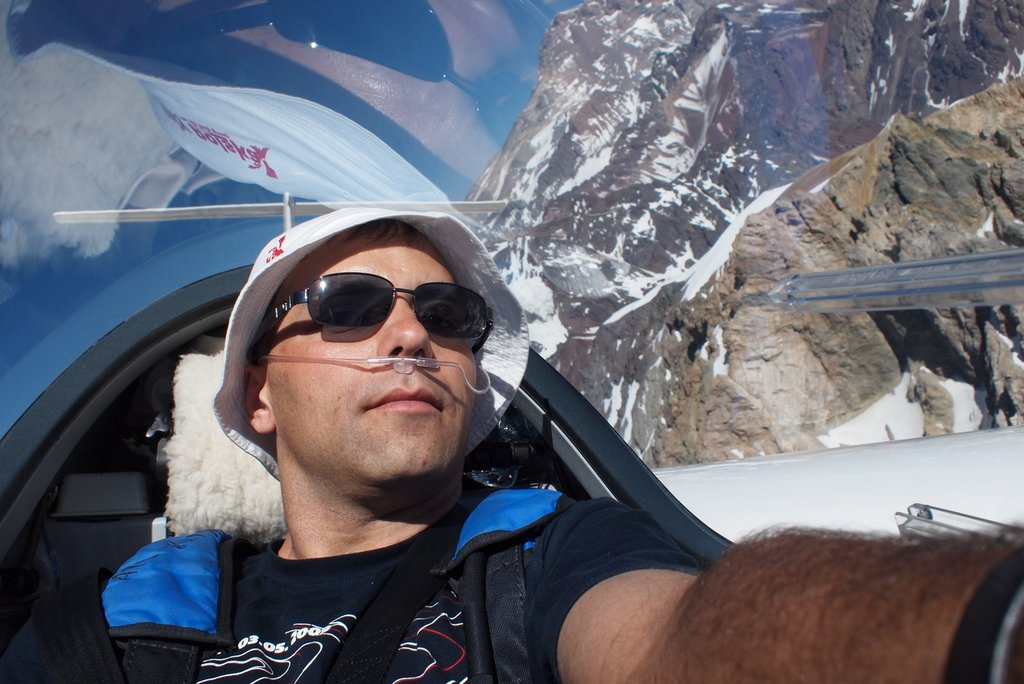
Sebastian Kawa

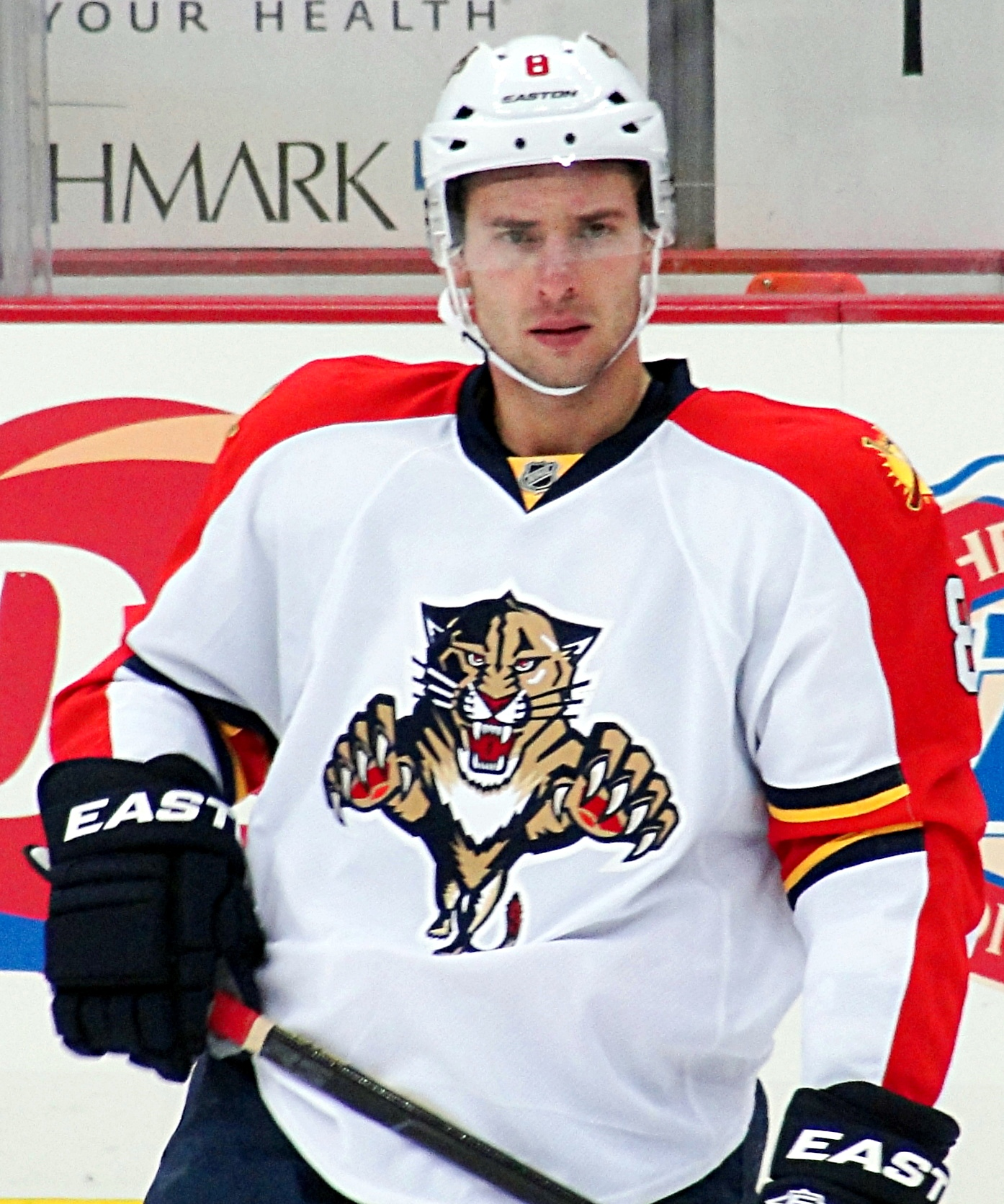
Wojtek Wolski

- James Kleist (1873–1949), German-American Jesuit scholar
- Heinz Fiebig (1897–1964), Wehrmacht general
- Jerzy Gorgoń (born 1949), Polish former football player
- Fritz Katz (1898–1969), pioneer of adrenal transplants
- Wolfgang Jörchel (1907–1945), Standartenführer in the Waffen SS
- Władysław Turowicz (1908–1980), Polish-Pakistani military scientist
- Vinzent Porombka (1910–1975), Communist activist
- Fritz Laband (1925–1982), German footballer
- Werner Heiduczek (1926–2019), German author
- Friedrich Nowottny (born 1929), German television journalist
- Janosch (1931-2026), German author
- Joachim Kroll (1933–1991), German serial killer
- Joachim Kerzel (1941–2026), German actor
- Jan Sawka (1946–2012), Polish-American artist, architect
- Krystian Zimerman (born 1956), Polish classical pianist
- Waldemar Sorychta (born 1967), Polish heavy metal musician and producer
- Sebastian Kawa (born 1972), Polish glider pilot, sixteen-time World Champion
- Grzegorz Rossoliński-Liebe (born 1979), Polish-German historian
- Czesław Śpiewa, (born 1979), Polish singer
- Wojtek Wolski (born 1986), Polish-Canadian ice-hockey player.
- Margarete Stokowski (born 1986), Polish-German writer
- Bartosz Bednorz (born 1994), Polish volleyball player
- The Dumplings (born 1996–1997), Polish electropop duo
- Damian Michał Heinisch (born 1968), Polish-German-Norwegian photographer

== International relations ==
=== Consulates ===
There is an Honorary Consulate of Armenia in Zabrze. There is a khachkar in Zabrze commemorating the Armenian–Polish friendship.

=== Twin towns – sister cities ===
Zabrze is twinned with:

- Essen, Germany
- Lund, Sweden
- Rivne, Ukraine
- Rotherham, England, United Kingdom
- Sangerhausen, Germany
- Seclin, France
- Trnava, Slovakia
- Zahlé, Lebanon
- Sønderborg, Denmark
