= Dorota (village) =

Former village in Poland

Coordinates: 50°17′56″N 18°47′15″E

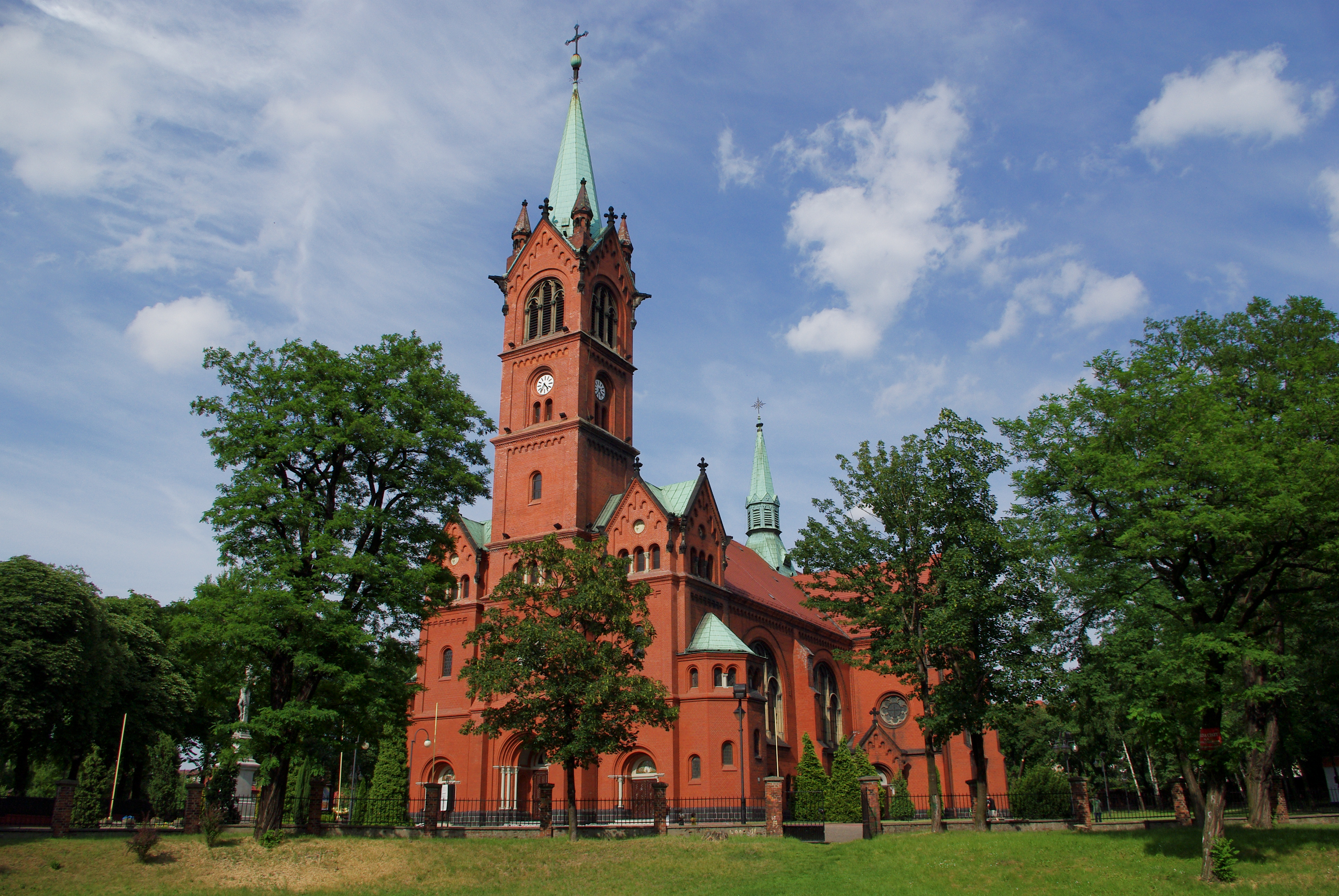
- St. Anna Church in Zabrze
- Interactive map of Dorota
- Merging with Zabrze: 1905

Dorota, also called Wieś Doroty and Dorotheendorf is a former Polish village; since 1905 it is a part of Zabrze in the Silesian Voivodeship. It was established between 1774 and 1775.

In 1873 it became a gmina in Bytom County, from 1873 it has been located in Zabrze Powiat.

On April 1, 1905, the Dorota gmina was merged with Stare Zabrze (Alt-Zabrze), Małe Zabrze (Klein-Zabrze) and with the manor areas Zaborze and Zabrze, creating the new gmina - Zabrze. Its name was changed on February 21, 1915, to Hindenburg O.S, and on October 1, 1922, it gained city status. On January 1, 1927, due to the liquidation of Zabrski Powiat, the town became independent city.

Now (2024), Dorota is part of Śródmieście and Centrum Południe.
