= Zaborze (Zabrze) =

- District
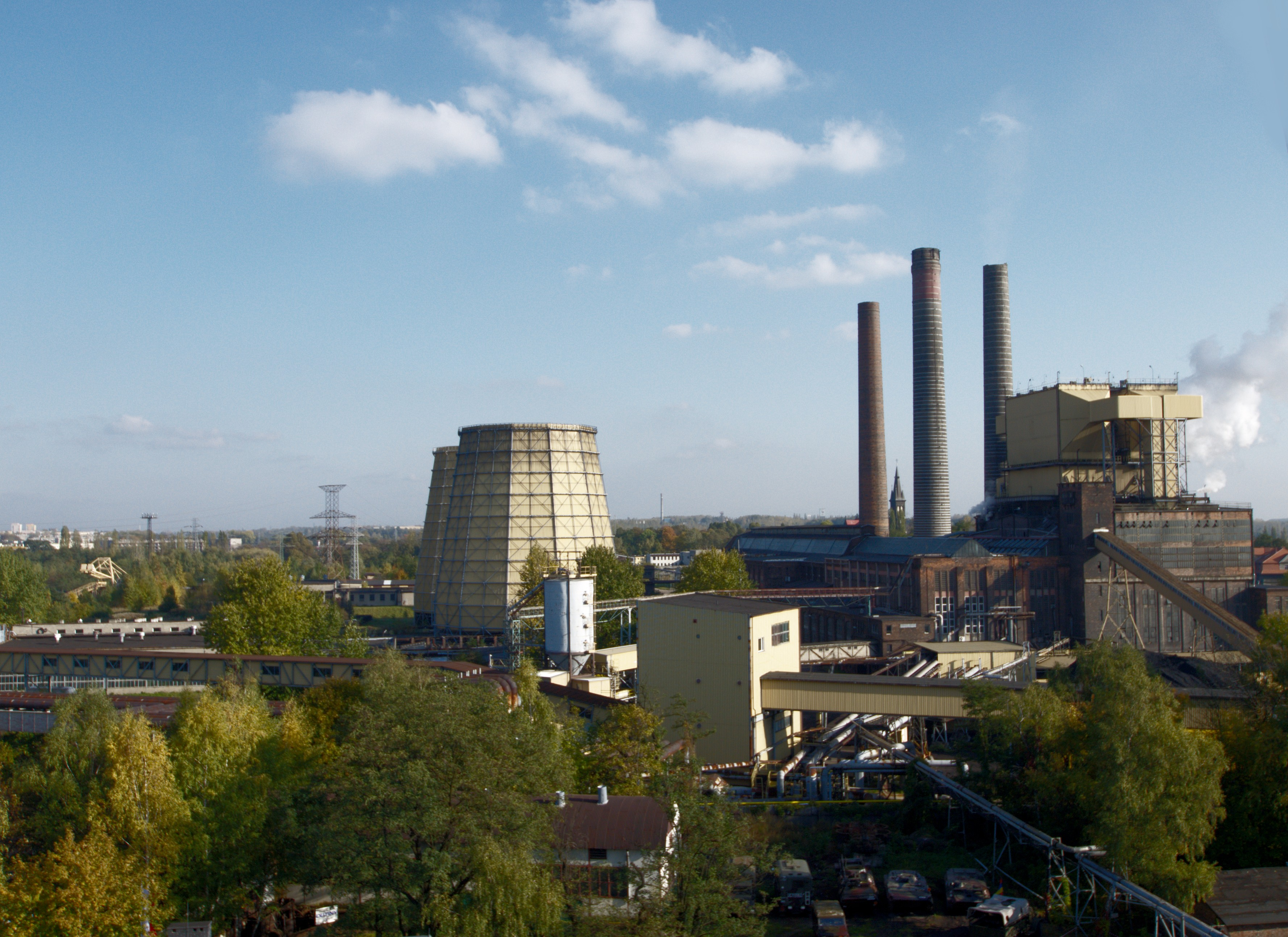
- CHP plant in Zaborze (2011)
- Interactive map of Zaborze
- Coordinates: 50°17′25″N 18°49′00″E
- Merged with Zabrze: 1927

Zaborze is a former village. Since 1927 it is a part of Zabrze, a city in Upper Silesia.

Until 1873, it had the status of an independent gmina and manor area in Bytomski powiat. In 1873, it was moved to Zabrski powiat. On 1 April 1905, the following gminas: Dorota (Dorotheendorf), Stare Zabrze (Alt-Zabrze), Małe Zabrze (Klein-Zabrze) and Zabrze were merged, creating a new gmina, which was named Zabrze.

After the Upper Silesia plebiscite, which took place in 1921, it was incorporated to Germany. It obtained city rights on 1 October 1922. On 1 January 1927, due to the liquidation of Zabrze powiat, Zaborze were merged with Zabrze.

Zaborze is as of 2024 split into two districts: Zaborze Południe and Zaborze Północ.
