= Charles Kent (English writer) =

English poet, biographer, and journalist

Charles (William Charles Mark) Kent (1823–1902) was an English poet, biographer, and journalist, born in London. After completing his education at Prior Park and Oscott, he became editor of the Sun (1845–1870), studied law at the same time and was called to the bar in 1859 as a member of Middle Temple, but thereafter devoted himself to literature. He edited Weekly Register, a Roman Catholic paper (1874–1881).

A personal friend of Charles Dickens, he contributed to Household Words and All the Year Round under Dickens's editorship and to other periodicals. Several volumes of poems, published previously in the forties, fifties, and sixties, provided the materials for his collected Poems (1870).

In later years he gave himself largely to editorial work—chiefly complete editions of the greater English writers, memoirs, and critiques, and notably Burns (1874), Lamb (1875 and 1893), Moore (1879), Father Prout (1881), and Lord Lytton (1875, 1883, and 1898). He also wrote Leigh Hunt as an Essayist (1888), The Wit and Wisdom of Lord Lytton (1883), and The Humour and Pathos of Charles Dickens (1884).

== Works ==
- Poems (1870)
- A mythological dictionary (1870)
- Charles Dickens as a Reader (1872)
- Leigh Hunt as an Essayist (1888)
- The Wit and Wisdom of Lord Lytton (1883)
- The Humour and Pathos of Charles Dickens (1884)

=== Contributions to the DNB ===
- Charles Michael Baggs
- Peter Augustine Baines
- William Barrett
- Hezekiah Linthicum Bateman
- Sidney Frances Bateman
- William Beckford
- Edward Bellasis
- John Chippendall Montesquieu Bellew
- Craven Fitzhardinge Berkeley
- Francis Henry Fitzhardinge Berkeley
- George Charles Grantley Fitzhardinge Berkeley
- Mary Berry
- Henry Digby Best
- Charles Bindley
- John Augustine Birdsall
- William Blanchard
- Countess Marguerite of Blessington
- John William Bowden
- George Bowyer
- James Yorke Bramston
- John Briggs (1788-1861)
- James Brown
- Thomas Joseph Brown
- William Henry Lytton Earle Bulwer
- James Calderbank
- Leonard Calderbank
- Thomas Carrick
- Thomas Chatterton
- Henry Cockton
- William Hepworth Dixon
- Charles Dolman
- John Doran
- Count D'Orsay, Alfred Guillaume Gabriel
- George Errington
- Frederick John Fargus
- Henry Ibbot Field
- John Forster
- James Robert Hope-Scott
- Edward George Fitzalan-Howard
- Henry Charles Howard
- Henry Granville Fitzalan- Howard
- Joseph Howe
- William Blanchard Jerrold
- Augustin Louis Josse
- Frances Maria Kelly
- Miles Gerald Keon
- Charles Mackay
- Pasquale Paoli
- Charles Reade
- Alfred Bate Richards
- George Rose (1817-1882)
- Marmion W. Savage
- John Palgrave Simpson
- George Augustus Frederick Percy Sydney Smythe
- Tom Taylor
- George Walter Thornbury
- George Alfred Walker
- Nicholas Patrick Stephen Wiseman

=== Contributions to Encyclopædia Britannica (1911) ===
- Henry Bulwer, 1st Baron Dalling and Bulwer

=== Pseudonym Mark Rochester ===
- The Derby Ministry: A Series of Cabinet Pictures (1858)
- The Gladstone Government: Being Cabinet Pictures (1869)

== Works about Kent ==
- Obituary: Mr. Charles Kent, man of letters in The Times
- Charles Kent in Notes by the Way by J. C. Francis, (1909).
