= Bishop Ellis =

Bishop Ellis may refer to:

== People ==
- Charles H. Ellis III, Bishop of the Pentecostal Assemblies of the World
- Edward Ellis, Bishop of Nottingham
- J. Delano Ellis, Chairman of the Joint College of African-American Pentecostal Bishops
- Philip Michael Ellis, Bishop of Segni
- Rowland Ellis, Bishop of Aberdeen and Orkney
- Tim Ellis, Bishop of Grantham
- Welbore Ellis, Bishop of Kildare

== Other ==
- Bishop Ellis Catholic Primary School in Leicestershire
