= Osiedle Młodego Górnika =

Osiedle Młodego Górnika Osiedle Młodego Górnika
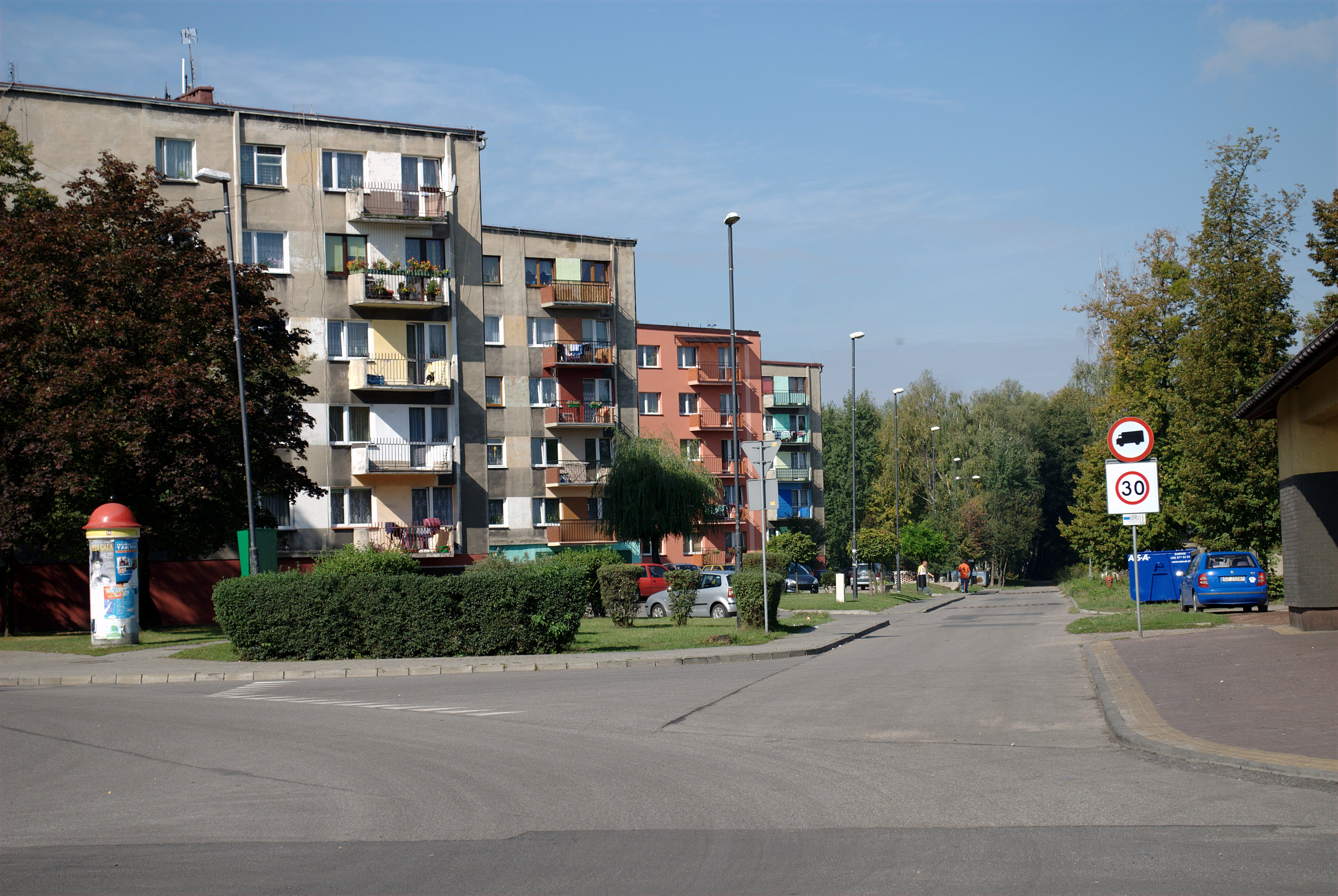
- Buildings in Młody Górnik's Street (2013)

- Osiedle Młodego Górnika is located in the north-eastern part of Zabrze

Area
  - Total: 22 km^{2} (8.5 sq mi)

Osiedle Młodego Górnika is a residential area located in north-eastern Zabrze. It was established in 2003.

== Location ==
Osiedle Młodego Górnika is located in northeastern Zabrze, it has an area of 2.2 square kilometers (approximately 1.37 sq mi). From the south it borders with Biskupice district, from the west with Mikulczyce and Rokitnica, and from the south with Miechowice, Bytom. The borders of the residential area are defined by Jan Nowak-Jeziorański Alley, Wojciech Drzymała Street, Ziemska Street and Pod Borem Street from the south, Franciszek Ballestrem Street and Ziemska Street from the west and by the border of the city from the north.

== Religion ==
The Saint Barbara's Church, which was erygated on December 7, 2013, is located in the residential area.

== Public communication ==
Public communication in the Osiedle Młodego Górnika consists of bus transport, which since January 1, 2019 is organized by Zarząd Transportu Metropolitalnego. As of February 2024, there are two bus lines: 111 and 280.

== Gallery ==
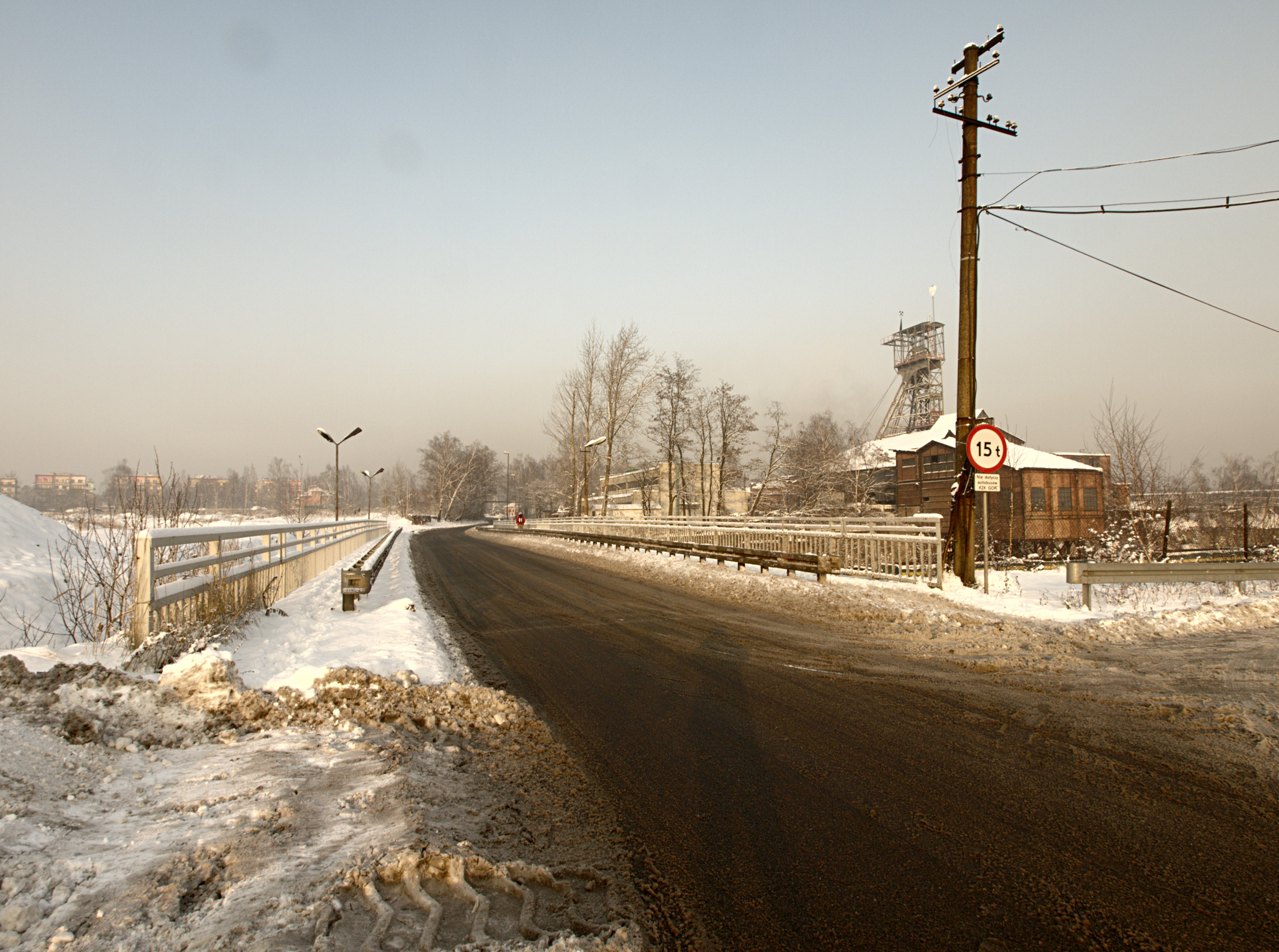
Szybowa Street (2010)

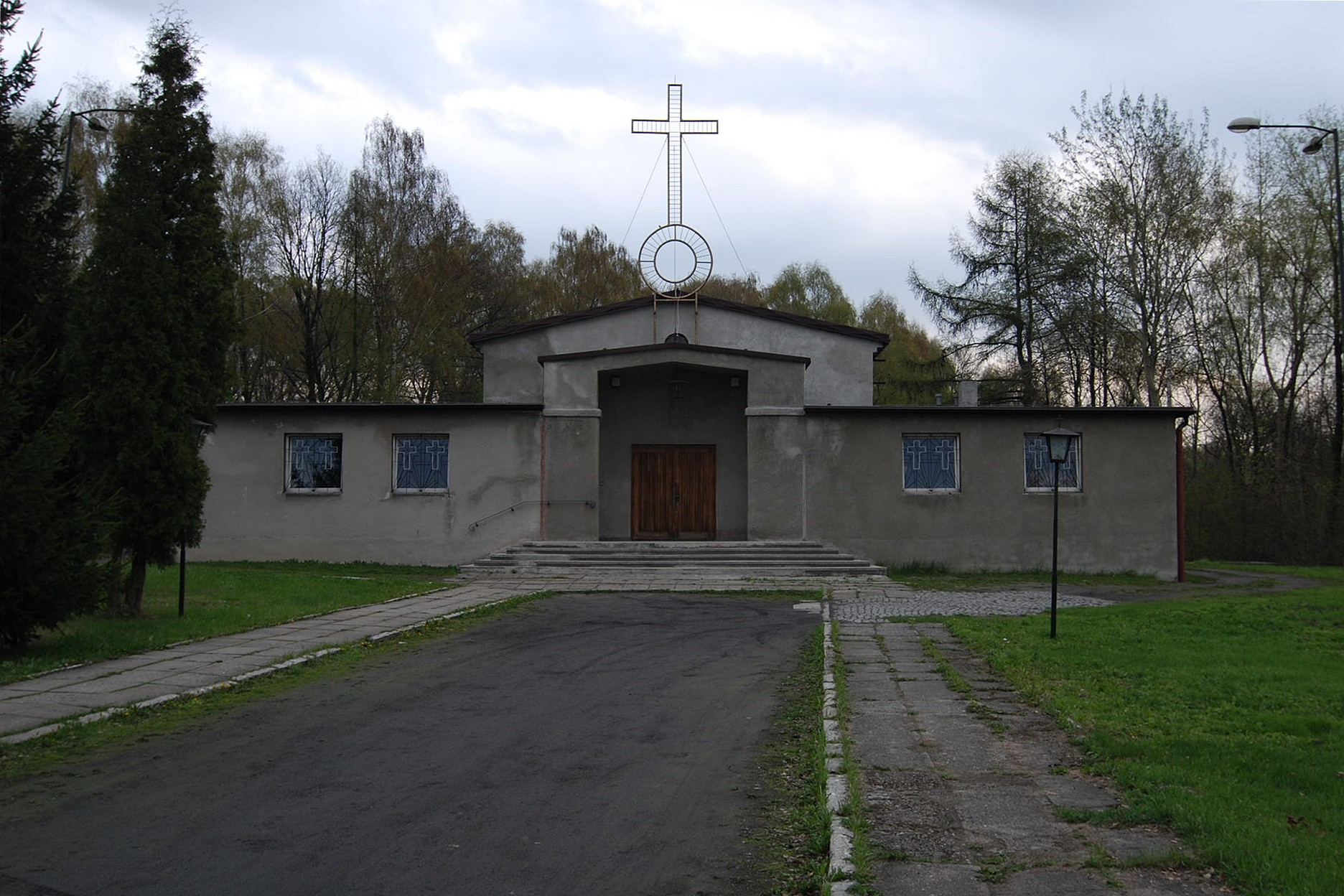
The St. Barbara's Church (2012)

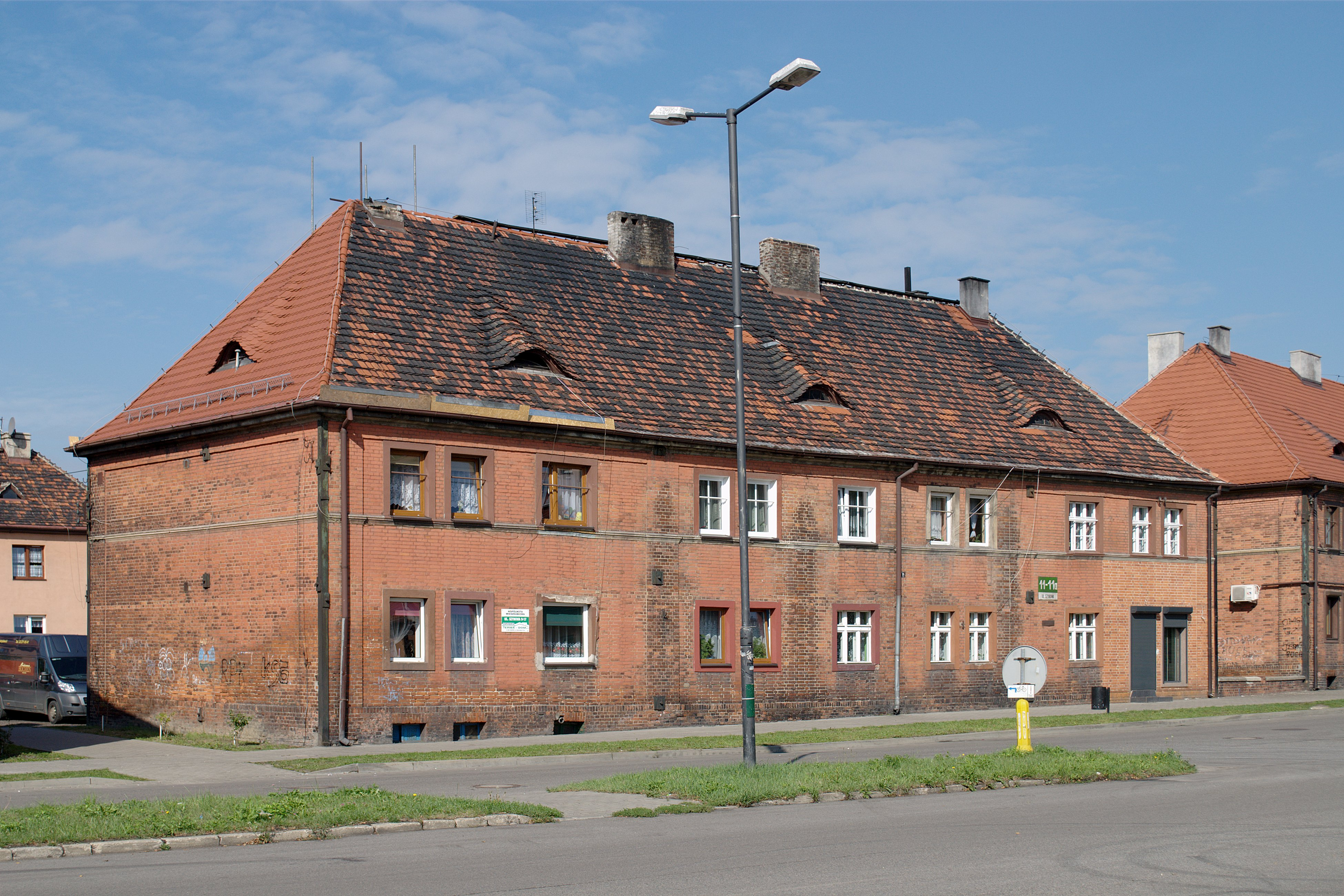
The house located at 11-11A Szybowa Street (2013)

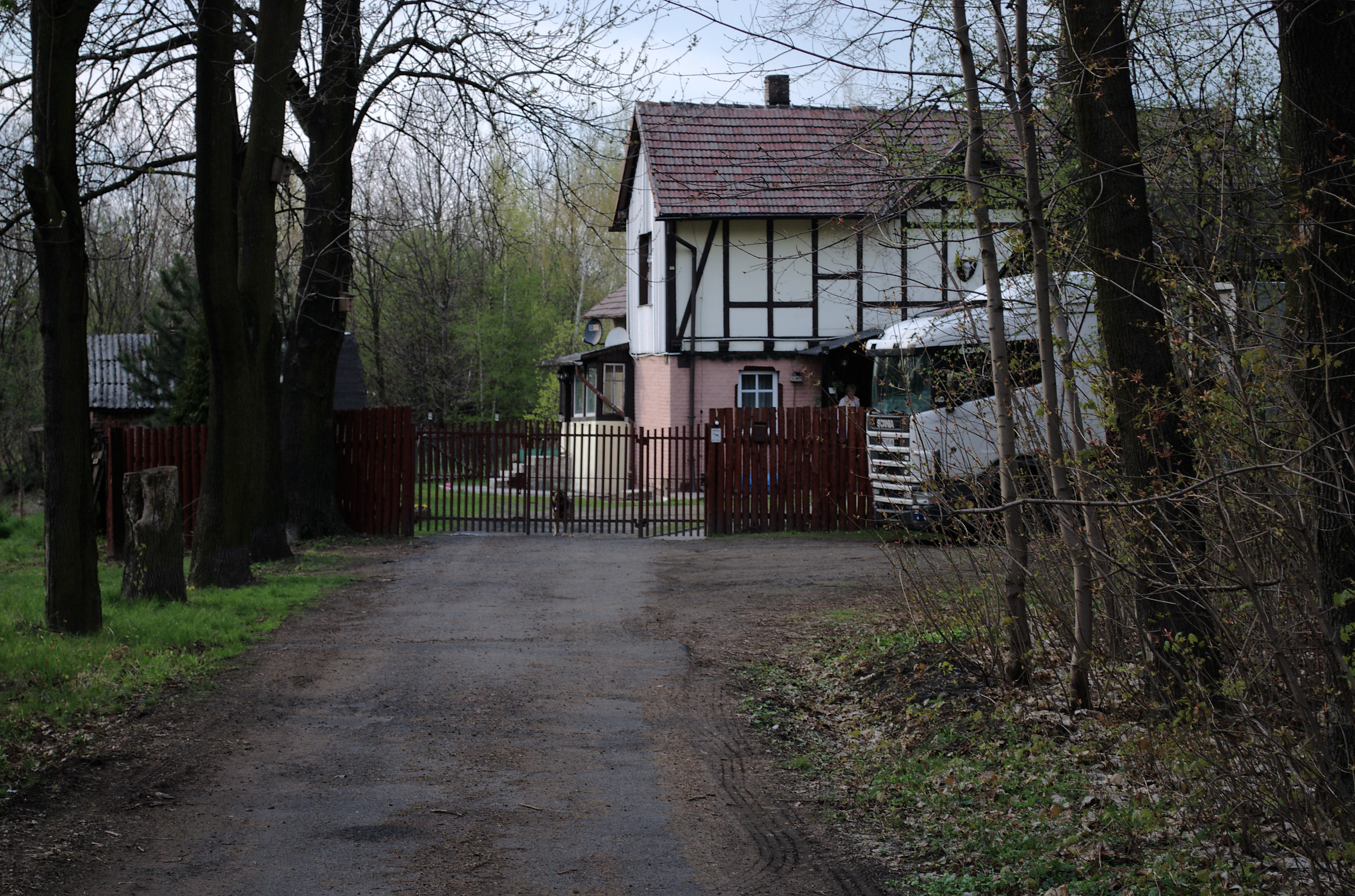
Forester's house located at 1 Pod Borem Street (2012)

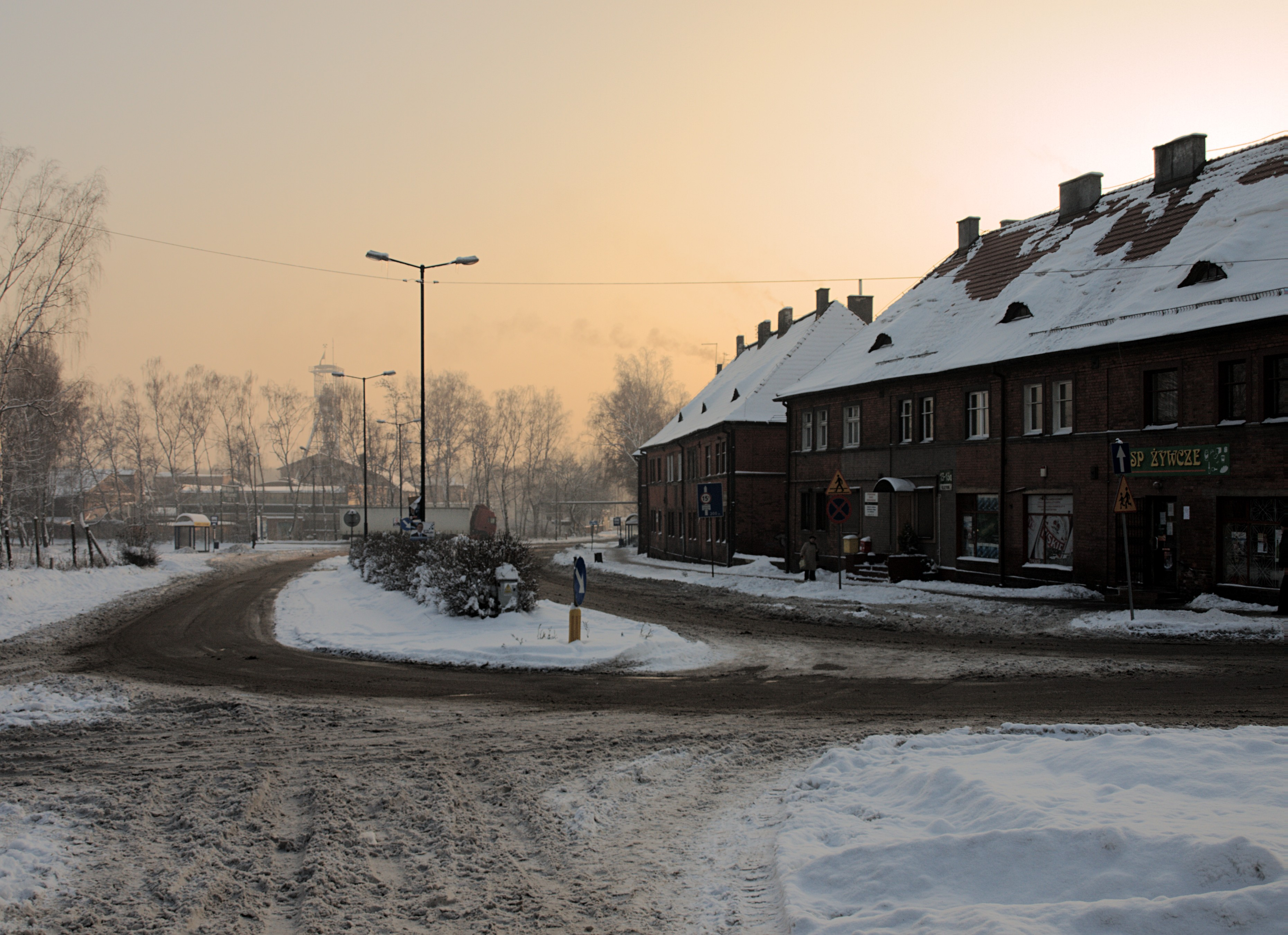
Szybowa Street during winter (2010)

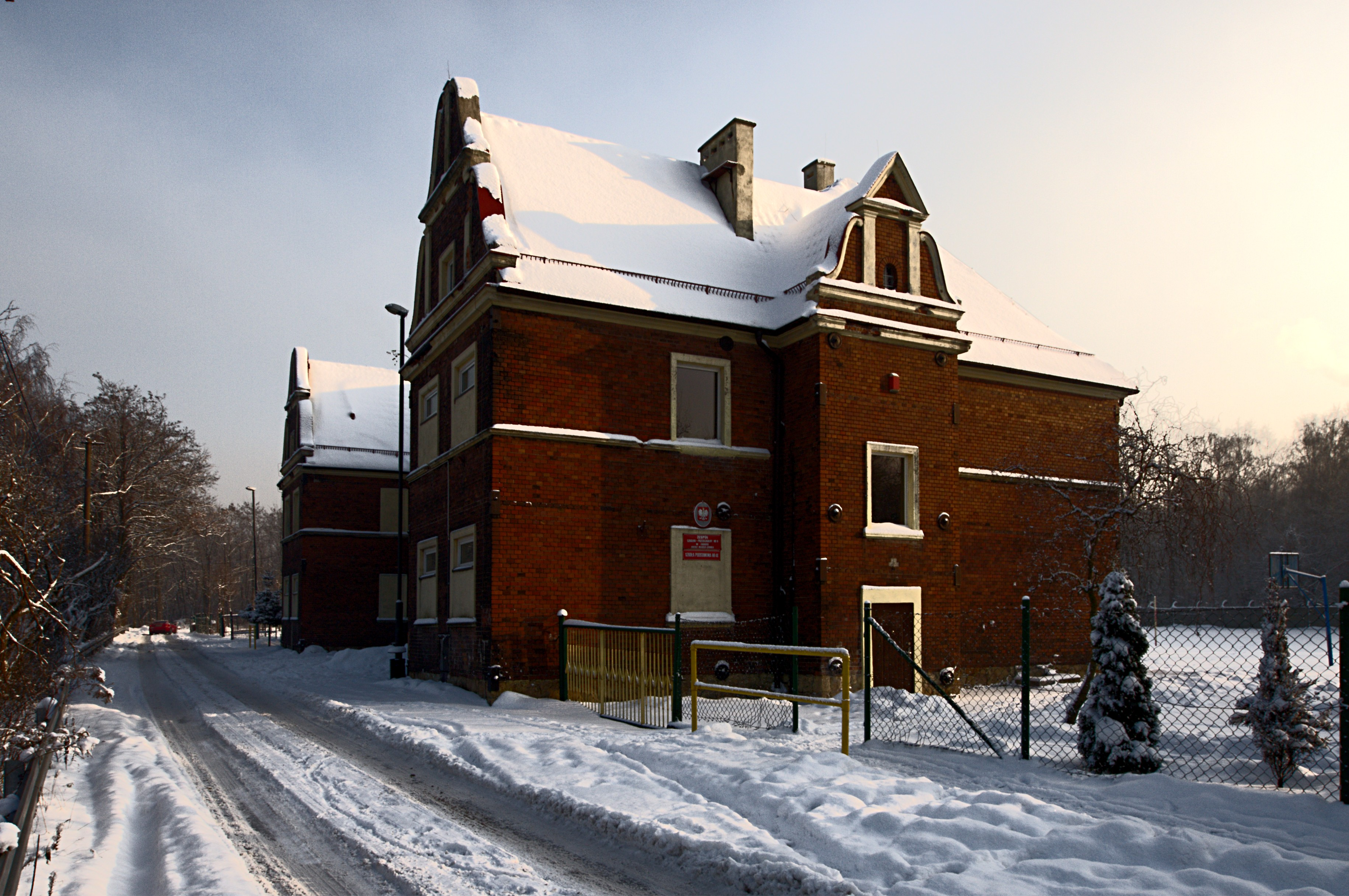
School building located at 15 Gwarecka Street, during winter (2010)
