= Charles Baggs =

The Right Reverend Charles Michael Baggs
- Vicar Apostolic of the Western District
- Church: Roman Catholic Church
- Appointed: 9 January 1844
- Term ended: 16 October 1845
- Predecessor: Peter Augustine Baines
- Successor: William Bernard Ullathorne
- Other post: titular Bishop of Pella

Orders
- Ordination: December 1830 (priest) by Giacinto Placido Zurla
- Consecration: 28 January 1844 by Giacomo Filippo Fransoni

Personal details
- Born: 21 May 1806 Belville, County Westmeath, Ireland
- Died: 16 October 1845 (aged 39) Prior Park, near Bristol, England
- Buried: (1) Prior Park Chapel; (2) Midford Castle Chapel; (3) Arnos Vale Cemetery
- Denomination: Roman Catholic
- Parents: Charles Baggs and Eleanor Kyan

Charles Michael Baggs (1806–1845) was a Roman Catholic bishop, controversialist, scholar and antiquary. He briefly served as the Vicar Apostolic of the Western District of England from 1844 to 1845.

== Biography ==
=== Early life and family ===
He was born in Belville, County Westmeath, Ireland, on 21 May 1806, the eldest son of Charles Baggs and Eleanor Kyan. His father was a Protestant barrister of Dublin (Ireland), who afterwards was judge of the court of vice-admiralty in Demerara, British Guyana (South America). His mother was the fourth daughter of John Howard Kyan of County Wicklow. Through his mother's family he is directly descended from the O'Cahans, a significant Irish clan in Ulster.

=== Education ===
His father being a member of the Church of Ireland, he was sent to a Protestant academy at Englefield Green in Berkshire. Early in 1820, his father died suddenly at Demerara, three days after hearing of the death of a friend for whom he had become security for 60,000 shillings. Upon the news of this double calamity, Charles Baggs was removed by his mother from Englefield Green to a Roman Catholic seminary at Sedgley Park, Staffordshire in June 1820. Twelve months later, he was transferred, at the instance of Bishop William Poynter, to St. Edmund's College, Ware, Hertfordshire, as an ecclesiastical student.

Three years later, he was sent to the English College, Rome to complete his ecclesiastical studies, arriving there on 9 June 1824. He became a distinguished student, winning prizes in logics, Hebrew, physics, mathematics and theology.

=== Priestly career ===
In 1830, he was ordained a subdeacon in November, a deacon in November or December, and a priest by Cardinal Zurla in December 1830. After his ordination, he remained in Rome, becoming Vice-Rector, and subsequently Rector, of the English College.

He was also made an honorary chamberlain (cameriere d'onore) by Pope Gregory XVI, with whom he was always an especial favourite.

=== Apostolic Vicar ===
He was appointed the Apostolic Vicar of the Western District of England (and Wales) and titular Bishop of Pella on 9 January 1844. His consecration took place at the church of San Gregorio Magno al Celio on 28 January 1844; the principal consecrator was Cardinal Giacomo Filippo Fransoni, assisted by Dr. Brown, Apostolic Vicar of the Lancashire District, and Dr. Collier, Bishop of Port-Louis, as co-consecrators.

He left Rome on 19 April 1844, and was welcomed by a large gathering of the clergy and laity at Prior Park near Bath, where he formally took possession of his vicariate on 30 May 1844. There, two days afterwards, he held his first ordination. He visited his extensive vicariate during the course of that summer, hand newly organised it in the autumn, by portioning it out, on 2 October, into four deaneries.

Shortly after taking up his residence at Prior Park, Bishop Baggs delivered a remarkable course of lectures on the supremacy of the Pope at the church of St. John the Evangelist, Bath.

At the beginning of the second year of his episcopate, Bishop Baggs died at Prior Park on 16 October 1845, aged 39. His remains were first interred in Prior Park Chapel, then reinterred at Midford Castle Chapel, and finally at Arnos Vale Cemetery, Bristol.

== Publications ==
He became a controversialist when he published two discourses as a young priest in 1836: "On the Supremacy of the Roman Pontiffs", which was delivered at the Church of Gesù e Maria in the Corso, Rome, on 7 February 1836; and the "Letter addressed to the Rev. R. Burgess, Protestant Chaplain at Rome", which appeared on 8 March 1836.

He also produced three ecclesiastical works:

- "The Papal Chapel Described and Illustrated from History and Antiquities" (1839).
- "The Ceremonies of Holy Week at the Vatican and S. John Lateran's: Described and Illustrated from History and Antiquities" (1839) and dedicated to Hugh Charles Clifford, 7th Baron Clifford of Chudleigh.
- "The Pontifical Mass sung at St. Peter's Church on Easter Sunday, on the Festival of SS. Peter and Paul, and Christmas Day, with a Dissertation on Ecclesiastical Vestments" (1840) and dedicated to Cardinal Giacomo Giustiniani, bishop of Albano and protector of the English College.

Baggs preached the funeral oration for his cousin, Gwendoline, widow of Marcantonio Borghese, 5th Prince of Sulmona, in the church of San Carlo ai Catinari on 23 December 1840. In its printed form, he inscribed it to the father of the young princess, John Talbot, 16th Earl of Shrewsbury.

Catholic Church titles
Preceded by Peter Augustine Baines	Apostolic Vicar of the Western District; 1844–1845	Succeeded by William Bernard Ullathorne
Preceded by Ignaz Bernhard Mauermann	titular Bishop of Pella; 1844–1845	Succeeded by Alexandre-Hippolyte-Xavier Monnet
