= Calderbank (surname) =

Calderbank is a surname. Notable people with the surname include:

- Anthony Calderbank, British translator
- Leonard Calderbank (1809–1864), British Roman Catholic priest
- Robert Calderbank (born 1954), American computer scientist, electrical engineer, and mathematician
