= Perth-hir House =

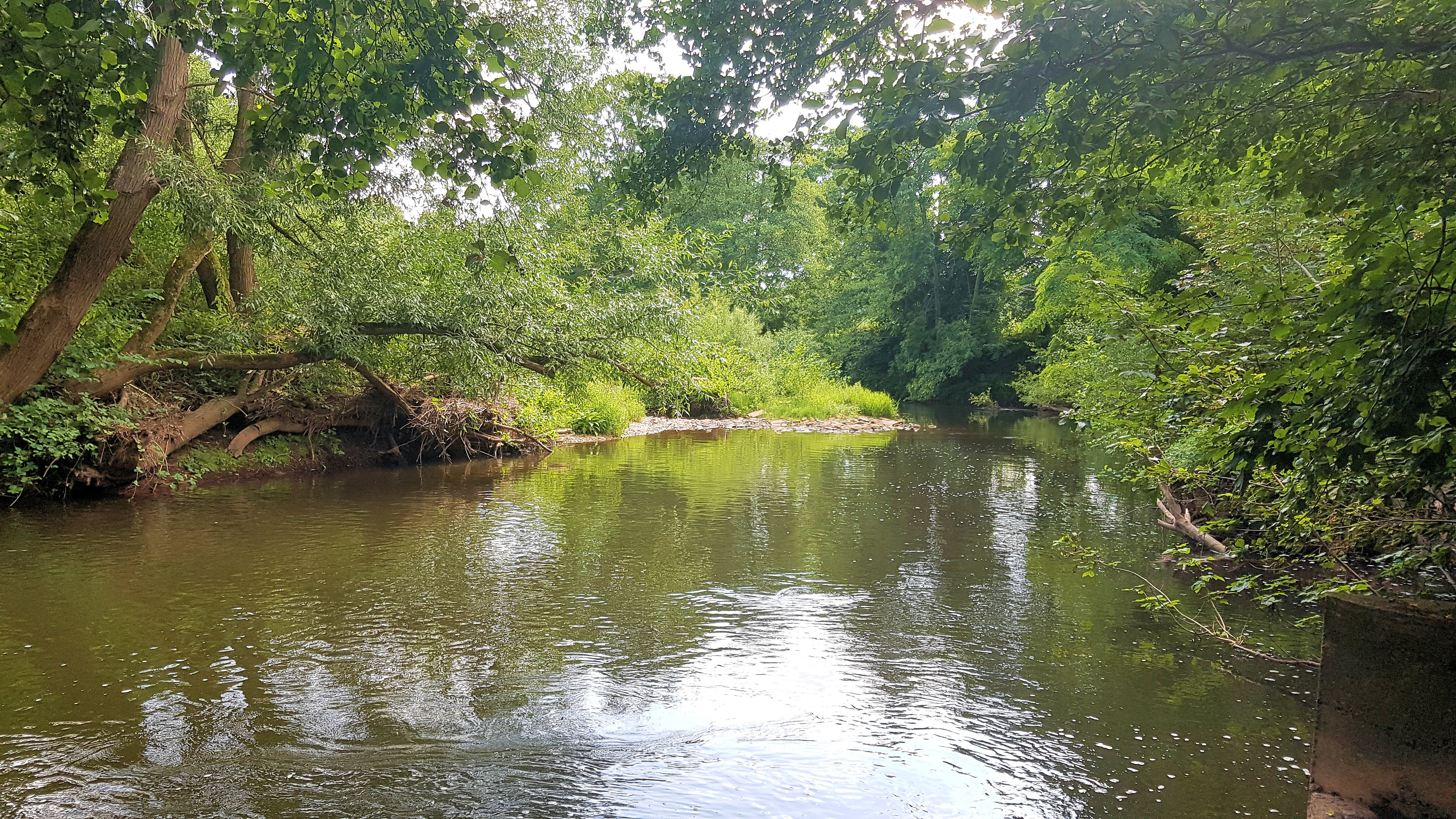
- The River Monnow just below the site of Perth-hir House

- Location within Monmouthshire
- 51.8396°N 2.7463°W
- Type: House
- Location: Rockfield, Monmouthshire

Scheduled monument
- Official name: Perth-Hir House (Remains of)
- Designated: 9 September 1952
- Reference no.: MM144

Perth-hir House, Rockfield, Monmouthshire, Wales, was a major residence of the Herbert family. It stood at a bend of the River Monnow, to the north-west of the village. At its height in the 16th century, the mansion, entered by two drawbridges over a moat, comprised a great hall and a number of secondary structures. Subsequently in the ownership of the Powells, and then the Lorimers, the house became a centre of Catholic recusancy following the English Reformation. By the 19th century, the house had declined to the status of a farmhouse and it was largely demolished in around 1830. Its ruins, and the site which contains considerable remnants of a Tudor garden, are a scheduled monument.

== History ==
The Herbert family is an Anglo-Welsh noble family that rose to prominence under William Herbert, the son of William ap Thomas, the builder of Raglan Castle. (Note: John Newman, in his Gwent/Monmouthshire volume of the Pevsner Buildings of Wales, records the many monuments to the family in the medieval Herbert Chapel at the Priory Church of St Mary in Abergavenny.) The family traditionally claimed descent from the Jenkins of Wern-ddu, a farmhouse in the north of the county. The American journalist and diplomat Wirt Sikes, United States consul at Cardiff in the 1870s and 1880s, recorded an encounter between Wern-ddu's last hereditary owner, Roger ap Probert, and a stranger, in his Rambles and Studies in Old South Wales, published in 1881. Questioned as to the history of the house, Probert replied; "Werndu (is) a very ancient house. Out of it came the Earls of Pembroke, the Lords Herbert of Cherbury, the Herberts of Coldbrook, the Joneses of Treowen and Llanarth and all the Powells; also, by the female line, came the Dukes of Beaufort". Sir Joseph Bradney, in his multi-volume work on the county, A History of Monmouthshire from the Coming of the Normans into Wales down to the Present Time, suggests that Perth-hir was bought from the de Clares in the 14th century by Thomas ap Thomas, fourth son of Gwilym ap Jenkin. (Note: These historic pedigrees should be treated with scepticism; Sir Cyril Fox and Lord Raglan, in the first of their three-volume study Monmouthshire Houses, wrote of the pedigrees of the Monmouthshire families; "Sir Joseph Bradney gives a large number (which) trace their ancestry to Welsh kings or Norman lords but are, like those of their English contemporaries, mostly fictitious".)

Following the English Reformation, Monmouthshire, particularly the northern part of the county, was an area noted for recusancy. Its relative remoteness, and the patronage of a number of powerful Catholic families, led by the Marquesses of Worcester (later Dukes of Beaufort) of Raglan Castle, enabled Catholic priests to operate with a degree of safety. The later owners of Perth-hir, the Powells and the Lorimers, were strongly Catholic in their sympathies. Their home became a refuge for Catholic priests and services were held in a small chapel, dedicated to St Catherine, which existed until the mid-18th century. The most notable priest in residence was Matthew Pritchard (or Prichard) (1669-1750), Catholic bishop and Vicar Apostolic of the Western District for much of the first half of the 18th century. The local church at Rockfield, St Cenedlon's became a place of burial, in contravention of the prevailing ecclesiastical laws, and a number of priests were laid to rest in the churchyard, while Pritchard is interred within the church itself. (Note: John Morgan-Guy, in his essay, Religion and Belief, 1660-1780, in the third volume of the Gwent County History, notes that the grave has a memorial stone inscribed with "R.I.P (Requiescat in pace), "an explicit prayer for the repose of his soul".)

At the beginning of the 19th century, Perth-hir became a popular attraction, as an extension of the Wye Tour. Both William Coxe and John Thomas Barber Beaumont described their visits in volumes published in 1801 and 1803. (Note: Both Coxe and Barber Beaumont relate, in almost identical wording, a long tale in which two members of the family argue at length over which of their branches of the family enjoys lineal precedence.) By this time, the house was already in decline, Coxe recording that the owner during his visit, Mr John Powell Lorimer, had "took down a part of the house, containing 13 bed chambers and other offices". Barber Beaumont describes the remains as a "diminished and patched-up building; … but a sorry remnant of past opulence." Within 30 years the house was almost entirely demolished.

South of the house, towards the B4347 Skenfrith-Monmouth road, are the ruins of Perthir Mill, the first paper mill established in Wales. D. G. Tucker gives a date for the mill of c. 1700.

== Architecture and description ==
The site of Perth-hir stands in a bend of the River Monnow, to the north-west of Rockfield village. Perth-hir appears to have been rectangular in plan, covering an area of roughly 50M square. Evidence of the moat, referenced by both Coxe and Barker Beaumont, remains. Elisabeth Whittle, in her Glamorgan and Gwent volume of the Ancient and Historic Wales series of guides published in 1992, notes the large ditch to the north and east of the house. Cadw dates the mansion to the 16th century, while the Royal Commission on the Ancient and Historical Monuments of Wales (RCAHMW) favours a slightly earlier date in the 15th. The extant remains comprise a section of wall, with an inset window, some 6M in length, and between 2 and 3M high. (Note: The RCAHMW notes that another section of wall, with an inset gateway, and known as the Perthir Gate, was removed to the gardens at Clytha Park, where it now stands.) (Note: The Dicamillo guide records that Jacobean panelling was also removed from Perth-hir and installed in the dining room at Clytha.) Fox and Raglan note the window's "ogee arch", a popular style in Monmouthshire at that date. The house was obviously of some grandeur; Coxe referenced the "long and lofty" great hall, and Peter Smith, in his study, Houses of the Welsh Countryside, records both an "ornate roof", and evidence of decorative heraldry.

The garden surrounding the site of the house is also recorded by the RCAHMW. It dates the gardens to the 15th century and notes their considerable extent, 68m by 88m. Part of a tower, or turret, stands at the eastern edge of the garden. RCAHMW is clear that it was not a dovecote but is uncertain as to its purpose. The remains of the house, and its site, are a scheduled monument.

== Sources ==
- Barber Beaumont, John Thomas (1803). A tour throughout South Wales and Monmouthshire. London: T. Cadell. OCLC 1051488179.
- Bradney, Joseph (1991) [1907]. The Hundred of Skenfrith. A History of Monmouthshire. Vol. 1 (Part 1). London: Academy Books. ISBN 978-1-873-36109-2. OCLC 896118881.
- Coxe, William (1995) [1801]. An Historical Tour of Monmouthshire: Volume 1. Cardiff: Merton Priory Press. ISBN 978-1-8989-3709-8. OCLC 34476778.
- Fox, Cyril; Raglan, Lord (1994) [1951]. Medieval Houses. Monmouthshire Houses. Vol. 1. Cardiff: Merton Priory Press Ltd & The National Museum of Wales. ISBN 9780720003963. OCLC 916186124.
- Hando, Fred (1987). Chris Barber (ed.). Hando's Gwent. Vol. 1. Abergavenny, Wales: Blorenge Books. ISBN 9780951044452. OCLC 18745431.
- Kissack, Keith (1975). Monmouth: The Making of a County Town. London: Phillimore and Co., Ltd. ISBN 0-85033-209-5. OCLC 2597663.
- — (1996). The Lordship, Parish and Borough of Monmouth. Hereford: Lapridge Publications. ISBN 978-1-899-29003-1. OCLC 59587626.
- Morgan-Guy, John (2009). "Religion and Belief, 1660-1780". In Gray, Madeleine; Morgan, Prys; Griffiths, Ralph A. (eds.). The Making of Monmouthshire, c.1536–1780. The Gwent County History. Vol. 3. Cardiff: University of Wales Press. ISBN 978-0-7083-2198-0. OCLC 552064875.
- Newman, John (2000). Gwent/Monmouthshire. The Buildings of Wales. London: Penguin Books. ISBN 978-0-140-71053-3.
- Smith, Peter (1975). Houses of the Welsh Countryside. London: Her Majesty's Stationery Office. ISBN 0-11-700475-8. OCLC 868639211.
- Sikes, Wirt (1992). Alan Roderick (ed.). Travels in Gwent. Newport, Wales: Handpost Books. ISBN 9780951521328. OCLC 26549951.
- Tucker, D. G. (1972). "The first Paper Mill in Wales? Perthir Mill on the Monnow, 1700" (PDF). Monmouthshire Antiquary. 3: 155–158.
- Whittle, Elisabeth (1992). Glamorgan and Gwent. Ancient and Historic Wales. London: HMSO. ISBN 978-0-117-01221-9.
