= St Cenedlon's Church, Rockfield =

Church located in Monmouthshire, Wales

Coordinates: 51.83°N 2.7535°W

St Cenedlon's Church
- Church of St Cenedlon (or Cenhedlon) (aka Rockfield Church)
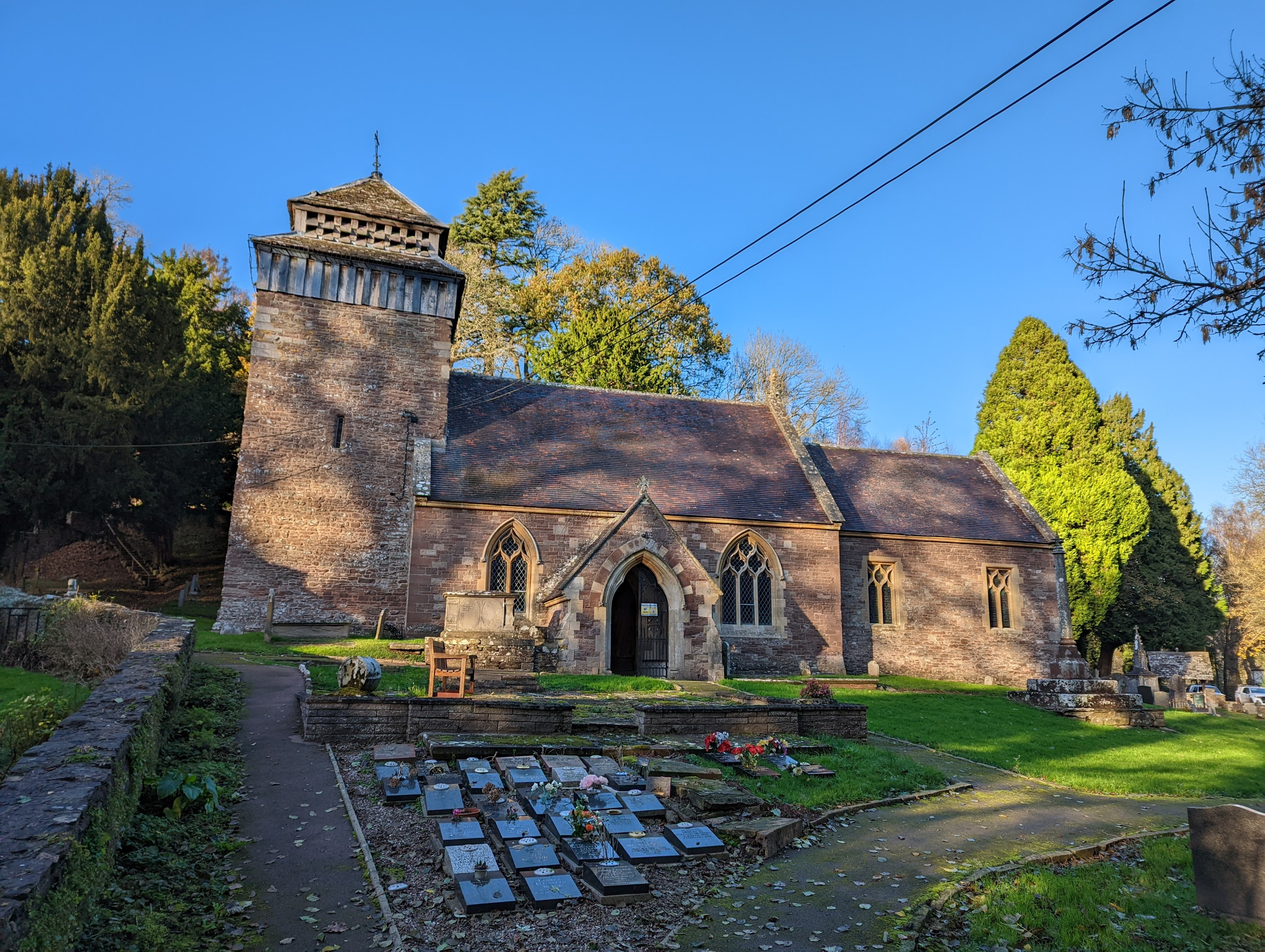

- Location in Monmouthshire
- Location: Rockfield, Monmouthshire
- Country: Wales
- Denomination: Church in Wales
- Website: Rockfield Church

History
- Founded: Medieval / restored 1859-1860

Architecture
- Functional status: Active
- Heritage designation: Grade II
- Designated: 27 November 1953
- Architect(s): John Pollard Seddon & John Prichard
- Architectural type: Church
- Style: Gothic Revival

Specifications
- Materials: Body of church: rubble Roof: slate

St Cenedlon's is a parish church in the village of Rockfield, Monmouthshire, Wales. The dedication to St Cenedlon is unusual and the history of the saint is obscure. Some sources suggest that she was a daughter of Brychan king of Brycheiniog while others identify her as the wife of King Arthfael ab Ithel, king of Glywysing. The existing church dates from the Middle Ages but only the tower remains from that period. After the English Reformation, the surrounding area of north Monmouthshire became a refuge for Catholics and Matthew Pritchard (1669-1750), Roman Catholic bishop and Vicar Apostolic of the Western District is buried at the church. By the mid-19th century the church was in ruins and a complete reconstruction was undertaken by the ecclesiastical architects John Pollard Seddon and John Prichard in around 1860. St Cenedlon's is an active parish church in the Diocese of Monmouth. It is designated by Cadw as a Grade II listed building.

== History ==
The dedication to St Cenedlon (or Cenhedlon) is rare, and details of the saint herself are obscure. The Monmouthshire antiquarian Sir Joseph Bradney, in his multi-volume A History of Monmouthshire from the Coming of the Normans into Wales down to the Present Time, identifies her as a daughter of Brychan, king of Brycheiniog (Brecknockshire) in the 5th century. Other sources suggest she was the wife of Arthfael ab Ithel, a king of Glywysing in the 7th century. Nothing remains of a building from either period, with the oldest existing part being the tower, which Cadw dates to the 14th century.

Following the English Reformation, Monmouthshire, particularly the northern part of the county, was an area noted for recusancy. Its relative remoteness, and the patronage of a number of notable Catholic families, led by the Marquesses of Worcester (later Dukes of Beaufort) of Raglan Castle, enabled Catholic priests to operate with a degree of safety. The church at Rockfield became a favoured refuge and a number of Catholic priests are buried in the churchyard, while Matthew Pritchard (1669-1750), Roman Catholic bishop and Vicar Apostolic of the Western District for much of the first half of the 18th century, is interred within the church itself. (Note: Matthew Pritchard (the name is also spelt Prichard) lived at Perth-hir House just over the River Monnow from Rockfield, which was owned successively by the Powell and Lorymer families, both strongly Catholic in their sympathies.) (Note: John Morgan-Guy, in his essay, Religion and Belief, 1660-1780, in the third volume of the Gwent County History, notes that the grave has a memorial stone inscribed with "R.I.P (Requiescat in pace), "an explicit prayer for the repose of his soul".)

By the mid-19th century, the building was a near ruin, and almost complete reconstruction was undertaken by John Pollard Seddon and John Prichard in around 1860. (Note: Cadw dates the reconstruction to 1858 to 1860, while John Newman, in his Gwent/Monmouthshire volume in the Pevsner Buildings of Wales series, dates it from 1859-1860.) The restoration was largely funded by John Etherington Welch Rolls, owner of The Hendre, a country estate surrounding the village of Rockfield. Rolls, and his son and heir, John Rolls, 1st Baron Llangattock, funded the restoration of a number of Monmouthshire churches, while serving the county as High Sheriff and Deputy lieutenant and undertaking a series of expansions that turned The Hendre into "the only full-scale Victorian country house in the county", with "the grandest and most important Victorian park and garden in Monmouthshire." Fred Hando, who chronicled the history, character and folklore of Monmouthshire in a series of nearly 800 newspaper articles for the South Wales Argus, published between the 1920s and the 1960s, noted during his visit to Rockfield that two vicars of the church had served as staff members at Monmouth School; the Rev. Thomas Hughes as usher in the late-18th century, and the Rev. George Monnington as headmaster in the mid-19th.

St Cenedlon's remains an active Church in Wales parish church in the Monmouth Marches Ministry Area within the Diocese of Monmouth. In 2022 the church was subject to a robbery that saw the loss of the ten original coping stones which topped the churchyard wall.

== Architecture ==
The “prominent” tower dates from the 14th century. It has a pyramidal roof with timber-cladding. The remainder of the building dates from Pritchard and Seddon's reconstruction. It is constructed of Red sandstone rubble and roofed in red tiles. Cadw calls the style Decorated Gothic Revival. Next to the altar is the grave of Matthew Pritchard. The church contains a plaque commemorating the men of the parish who died in the First World War, headed by the name of John Rolls, 2nd Baron Llangattock, who died in October 1916 from wounds received at the Battle of the Somme. It also houses a Royal Arms of Wiliam III dating from 1700. (Note: The Royal Arms were discovered in a local school, where they were being utilised as a bulletin board, and were returned to the church in 1976.) The church is a Grade II listed building.

== Gallery ==
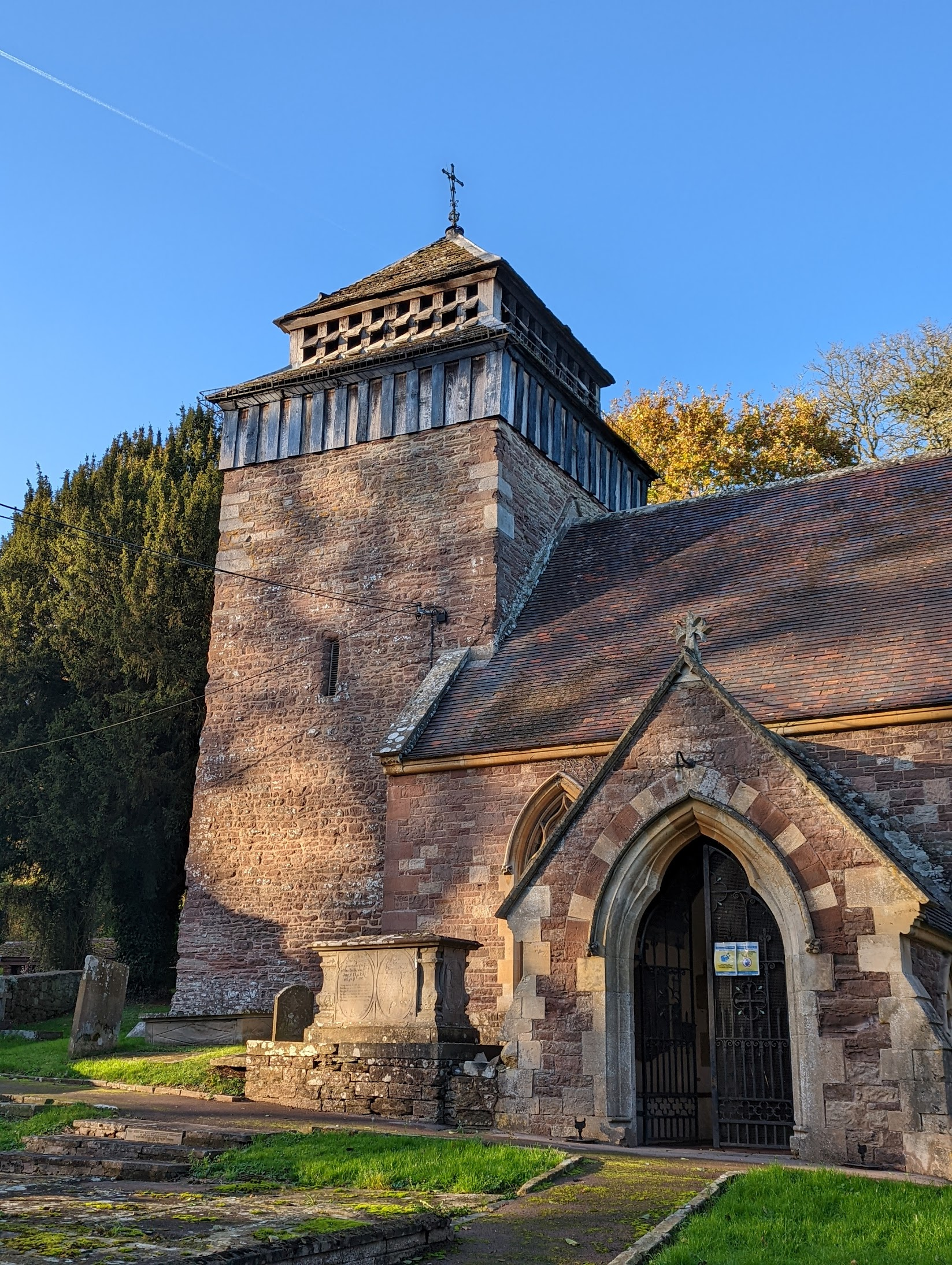
The 14th-century tower

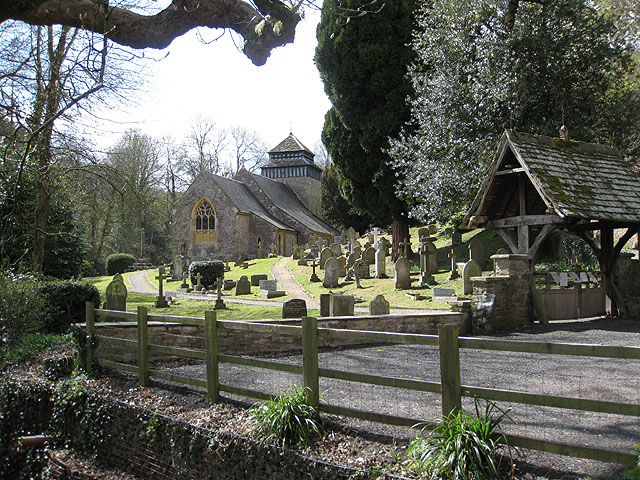
The church and lychgate

The lychgate

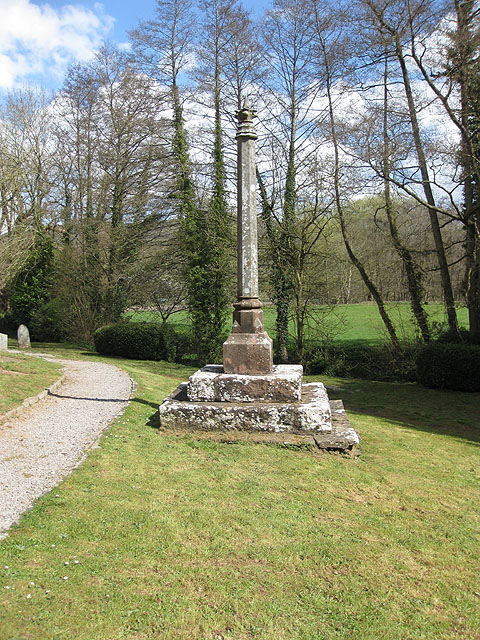
The preaching cross

== Sources ==
- Bradney, Joseph (1991) [1907]. The Hundred of Skenfrith. A History of Monmouthshire. Vol. 1 (Part 1). London: Academy Books. ISBN 978-1-873-36109-2. OCLC 896118881.
- Clark, Arthur (1979). The Story of Monmouthshire from the earliest times to the Civil War. Vol. 1. Monmouth, Wales: Monnow Press. ISBN 978-0-950-66181-0. OCLC 866777550.
- Guy, John; Smith, Ewart (1980). Ancient Gwent Churches. Newport: The Starling Press. OCLC 656714152.
- Hando, Fred (1987). Chris Barber (ed.). Hando's Gwent. Vol. 1. Abergavenny: Blorenge Books. ISBN 978-0-951-04445-2. OCLC 18745431.
- Kissack, Keith (1996). The Lordship, Parish and Borough of Monmouth. Hereford: Lapridge Publications. ISBN 978-1-899-29003-1. OCLC 59587626.
- Morgan-Guy, John (2009). "Religion and Belief, 1660-1780". In Gray, Madeleine; Morgan, Prys; Griffiths, Ralph A. (eds.). The Making of Monmouthshire, c.1536–1780. The Gwent County History. Vol. 3. Cardiff: University of Wales Press. ISBN 978-0-7083-2198-0. OCLC 552064875.
- Newman, John (2000). Gwent/Monmouthshire. The Buildings of Wales. London: Penguin Books. ISBN 978-0-140-71053-3.
