= Peter Collingridge =

English Roman Catholic bishop

Styles of Peter Collingridge, OFM
- Reference style: The Right Reverend
- Spoken style: My Lord or Bishop

Peter Bernardine Collingridge, O.F.M.Rec. (10 March 1757 – 3 March 1829) was an English Roman Catholic bishop who served as the Vicar Apostolic of the Western District of England and Wales from 1809 to 1829.

== Life ==
Born at Fritwell, Oxfordshire, Collingridge was appointed coadjutor to Bishop William Gregory Sharrock, Vicar Apostolic of the Western District on 13 January 1807. On the same day, he was appointed Titular Bishop of Thespiae, and consecrated on 11 October 1807.

On 18 October 1809, aged 52, he succeeded to Vicar Apostolic of the Western District.

On 3 March 1829, Bishop Collingridge died, at Cannington, Somersetshire, one week before his 72nd birthday the same year as Catholic Emancipation. He had been a bishop for 21 years.

== Notes ==
Catholic Church titles
Preceded by William Gregory Sharrock	Vicar Apostolic of the Western District; 1809–1829	Succeeded by Peter Augustine Baines
