= Augustine Baines =

English Benedictine

The Right Reverend Peter Augustine Baines O.S.B.
- Vicar Apostolic of the Western District
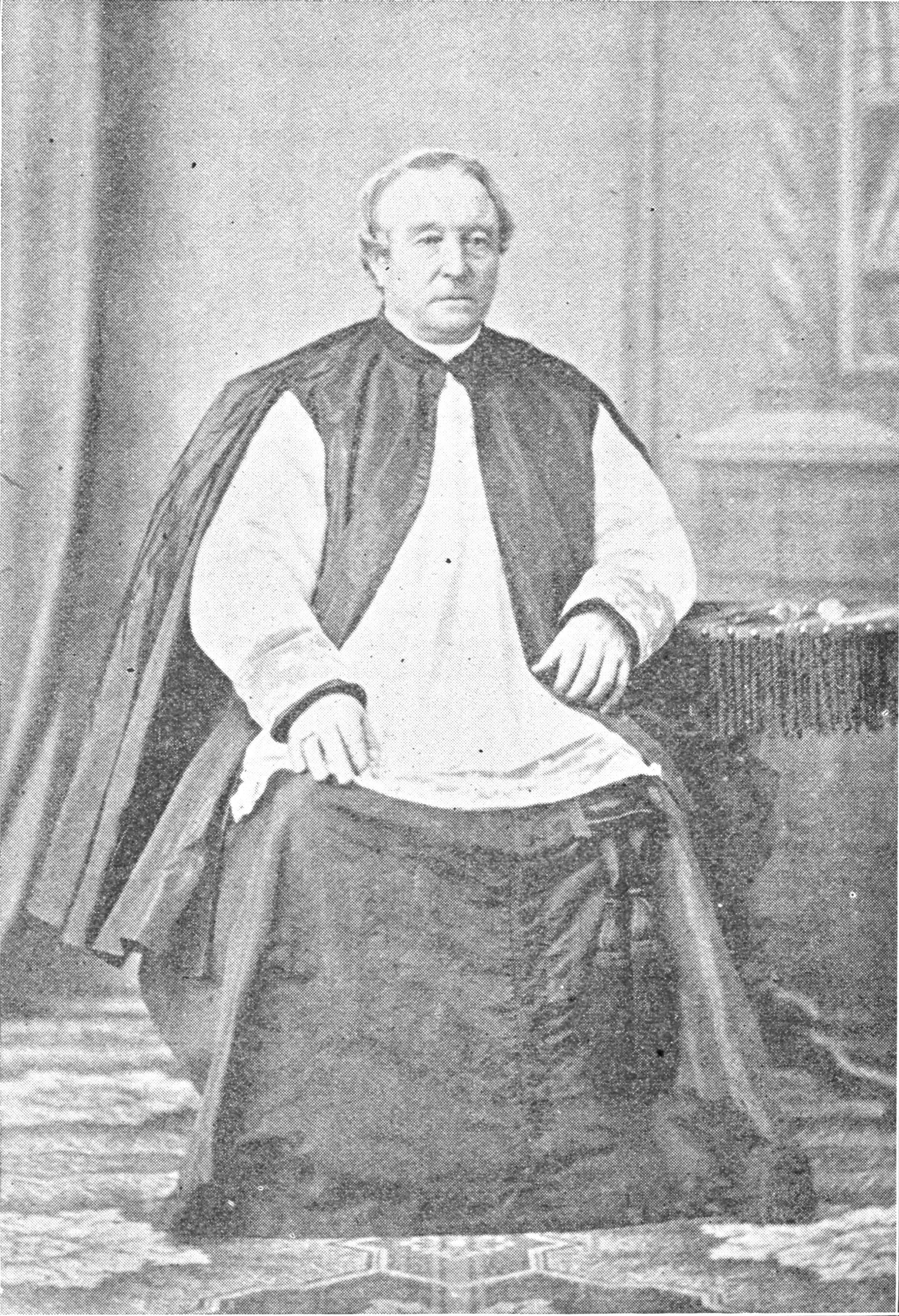
- Appointed: 3 March 1829
- Term ended: 6 July 1843
- Predecessor: Peter Collingridge
- Successor: Charles Michael Baggs
- Other post: Titular Bishop of Sigus
- Previous post: Coadjutor Vicar Apostolic of the Western District (1823–1829)

Orders
- Ordination: 7 April 1810
- Consecration: 1 May 1823 by Daniel Murray

Personal details
- Born: 25 June 1786 or 25 January 1787 Peartree Farm, Kirkby, near Liverpool, England
- Died: 6 July 1843 Prior Park College, Bath, Somerset, England
- Buried: Downside Abbey, Stratton-on-the-Fosse, Somerset, England
- Denomination: Roman Catholic

Peter Augustine Baines (1786/87–1843) was an English Benedictine, Titular Bishop of Siga and Vicar Apostolic of the Western District of England.

== Life ==
For his early education he was sent to Lamspringe Abbey, near Hildesheim, in the Kingdom of Hanover, where he arrived in 1798. Four years later the monastery was suppressed by the Prussian Government, and the monks and their pupils returned to England. Some of them, including Baines, took refuge at the recently founded monastery at Ampleforth, Yorkshire. He joined the Benedictine Order, and held in succession every post of authority in the monastery, the priorship alone excepted.

In 1817 Baines left Ampleforth and was appointed to Bath, one of the most important Benedictine missions in the country. There he became a well-known figure, his sermons attracting attention not only among Catholics, but also among Protestants. His printed letters in answer to Charles Abel Moysey, Archdeacon of Bath, became known as Baines's Defence.

Bishop Peter Bernardine Collingridge, Vicar Apostolic of the Western District selected Baines as his coadjutor. He received episcopal consecration as Titular Bishop of Siga by Archbishop Daniel Murray at Dublin, 1 May 1823.

Bishop Baines soon began to formulate schemes for the future of the district, on a large scale. It was without a regular seminary for the education of its clergy. The Western District differed from the other three in that the bishop had always been chosen from among the regular clergy, Benedictines or Franciscans, and a large proportion of the missions were in their hands. Baines thought that he saw the solution of his difficulty in utilising the recently opened Downside School, near Bath, under Benedictine management. Baines proposed that the whole community of monks at Downside should be transferred from the Anglo-Benedictine Congregation, and placed under the Bishop of the Western District, but these proposals were not warmly received.

In 1826 Bishop Baines' health worsened and he was ordered a long tour on the Continent. He spent the greater part of the time in Rome. Bishop Collingridge died on 3 March 1829, the same year in which Catholic emancipation was passed. Bishop Baines returned to England, in restored health, to succeed as vicar Apostolic.

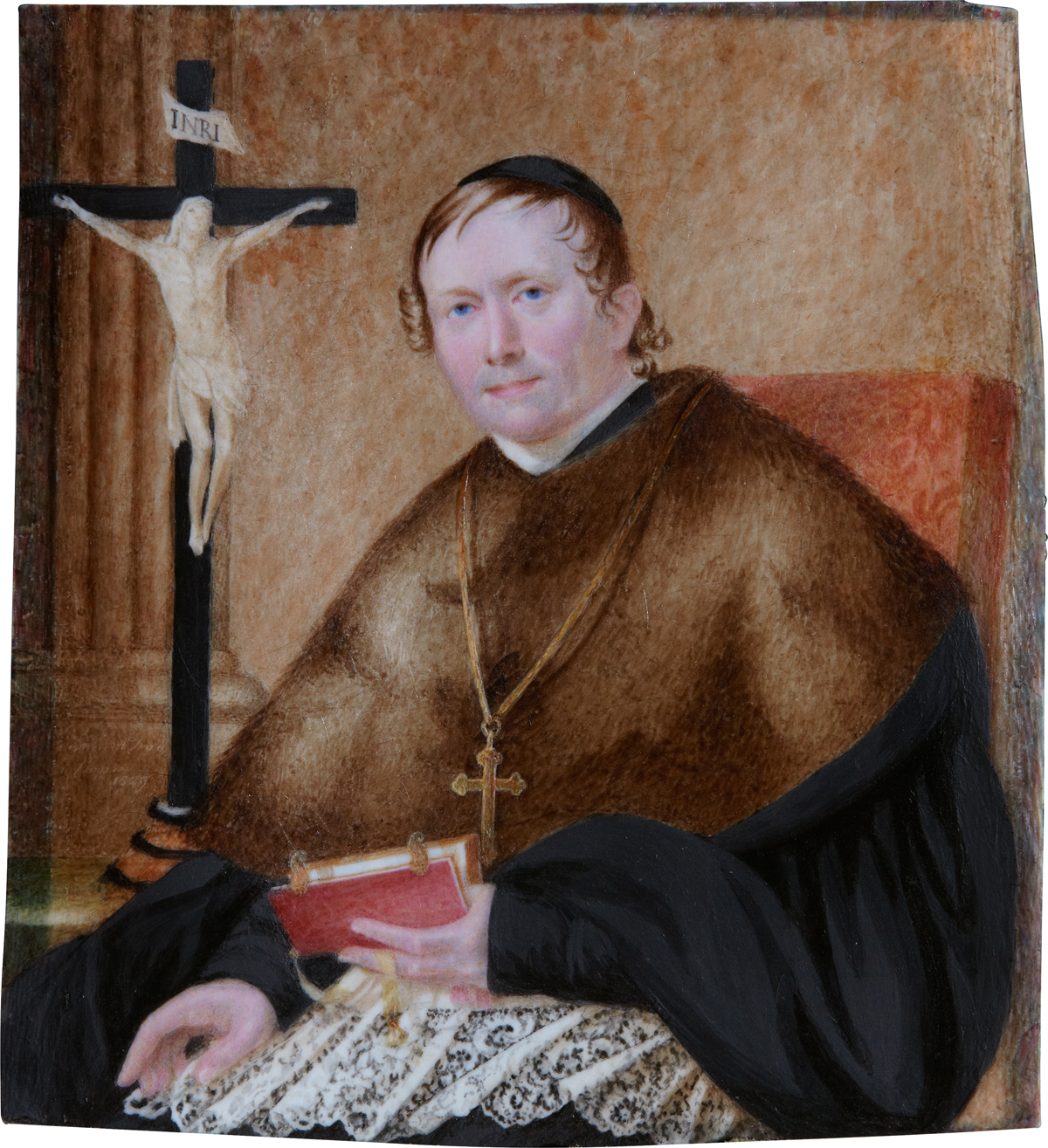
An 1829 painting of him by Ann Agnes Trail (Sister Agnes Xavier)

He at once revived his scheme for the seminary at Downside, and, having failed to secure the consent of the monks, he put forward the contention that the monasteries at Downside and Ampleforth had never been canonically erected, for, owing to the unsettled condition of the English mission, the formality of obtaining the written consent of the ordinary had been overlooked. He drew the drastic conclusion that all the monastic vows had been invalid, and that the property belonged to the bishops. The case was argued out in Rome, but it was considered that, even if the strict law was on Bishop Baines' side, equity demanded that the rights of the Benedictines should be maintained, and a sanatio was issued by papal authority, making good any possible defects in the past. Leave was given for four monks at Ampleforth, including the prior, to be secularised. They left, together with thirty of the boys, to join Bishop Baines, who had himself been secularised, in founding a new college.

The site chosen was Prior Park College, a large mansion outside Bath, which Bishop Baines bought, and he set to work to build two colleges at either end of the "mansion house", which he dedicated to St. Peter and St. Paul respectively, the former being intended as a lay college, the latter as a seminary, but the new college never became prosperous. In 1840 the number of vicariates in England was raised from four to eight, Wales being separated off into a district of its own. Bishop Baines continued over the Western District for three years more, when his sudden death took place.

On 4 July 1843, he distributed the prizes at Prior Park; the following day he preached at the opening of the new church of St Mary on the Quay, Bristol, returning to Prior Park in the evening, apparently in his usual health; but the following morning he was found dead in his bed. His funeral was at Prior Park and some years later, his body was removed to Downside Abbey.

An oil painting of him, formerly at Prior Park, is now at the Bishop's House (St. Ambrose), Clifton. There is an engraving in the Catholic Directory for 1844. Also a large portrait hangs in the Chapel of the Lady of our Snows at Prior Park College.

== Notes ==
Catholic Church titles
| Preceded by Peter Bernardine Collingridge | Vicar Apostolic of the Western District; 1829–1843 | Succeeded by Charles Michael Baggs |
