= Charles Walmesley =

English Roman Catholic bishop (1722–1797)

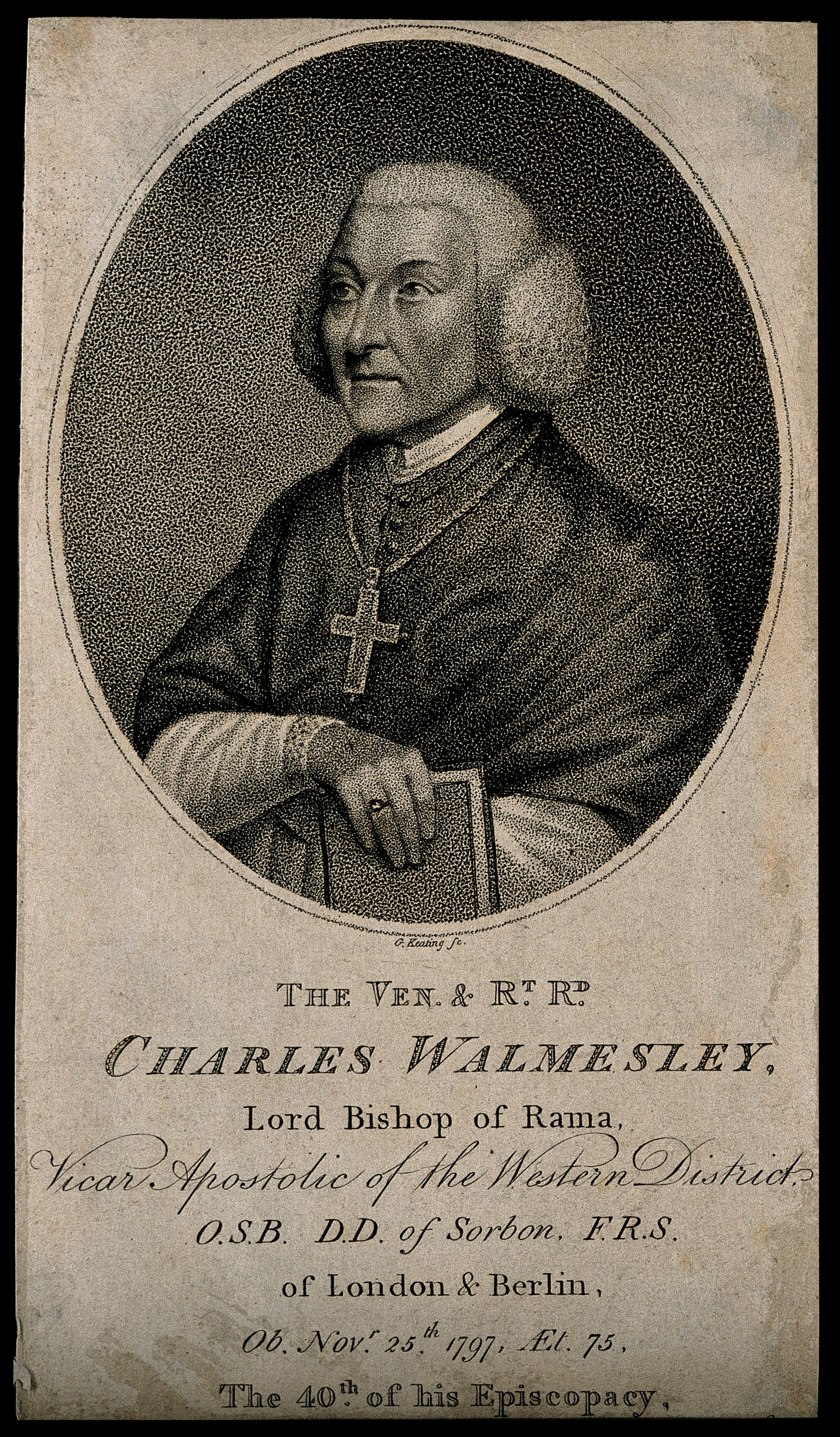
Portrait of Walmesley held in the Wellcome Collection

Charles Walmesley, OSB (best known by the pseudonyms Signor Pastorino or Pastorini; 13 January 1722 – 25 November 1797) was an English Catholic prelate who served as Vicar Apostolic of the Western District. He was known, especially in Ireland, for predicting the downfall of Protestantism in 1821–5 and the triumphant emergence of the Catholic Church. He was a member of the Benedictines.

== Early life ==
He was the seventh son of John Walmesley of Westwood House, Wigan, Lancashire, and was born at Wigan Lane House in 1722. was educated at the English Benedictine College of St. Gregory at Douai (now Downside School, near Bath); and made his profession as a Benedictine monk at the English Monastery of St. Edmund, Paris (now Douai Abbey, near Reading), in 1739. Later he took the degree of DD at the Sorbonne.

Walmesley's scientific attainments soon brought him into notice as an astronomer and mathematician. He was consulted by the British Government on the reform of the calendar and introduction of the "New Style" in 1750–52, and was elected a Fellow of the Royal Society of London, and the kindred societies of Paris, Berlin, and Bologna.

== Procurator General ==
From 1749 to 1753 Walmesley was Prior of St. Edmund's Priory in Paris and in 1754 was sent to Rome as procurator general of the English Benedictine Congregation. Two years later he was selected by Propaganda Fidei as coadjutor bishop, with right of succession, to Lawrence William York, the Vicar Apostolic of the Western District; and was consecrated Bishop of Rama on 21 December 1756. He administered the vicariate after York's retirement in 1763, and succeeded that prelate on his death in 1770.

Walmesley's energy and ability attracted to him an amount of attention seldom given to Catholic bishops in England in the eighteenth century. So much was this the case that during the "No Popery" riots of June 1780, a post-chaise conveying four of the rioters, and bearing the insignia of the mob, drove the whole way from London to Bath, where Walmesley then resided. These men worked upon the people of Bath so much that the newly built Catholic chapel in St. James's Parade was burned to the ground, as well as the presbytery in Bell-Tree Lane; all the registers and diocesan archives, with Walmesley's private library and manuscripts, being destroyed.

In 1789 when the action of the "Catholic Committee" threatened seriously to compromise the English Catholics, Walmesley called a synod of his colleagues, and a decree was issued that the bishops of England "unanimously condemned the new form of oath intended for the Catholics, and declared it unlawful to be taken". The issue was over the form of an oath of loyalty to George III, necessary for Catholics to engage with the official world. The previous oath had been defined in the Roman Catholic Relief Act, 1778.

On 15 August 1790, Walmesley consecrated John Carroll as the first Catholic bishop in the United States, at Lulworth Castle, Dorset in England.

== Burial ==
In the latter part of his life, Walmesley suffered from deafness. He died in Bath, and was buried at St. Joseph's Chapel, Trenchard Street, Bristol. In 1906 the bodies there interred were removed, and the bishop's remains were translated to Downside Abbey and placed in a vault beneath the choir of the abbey church. Thus, more than a century after his death, his body came into the charge of that community by which he was educated nearly two hundred years ago.

The suggestion was put forward that the bishops of the two hierarchies of America and England, of whom the large majority trace their spiritual descent to Walmesley, should erect a fitting monument over his grave. The proposal met with generous support, and a beautiful altar tomb with recumbent effigy in alabaster from the designs of F. A. Walters, F.S.A., has now been erected on the Gospel side of the sanctuary.

== Works ==
Walmesley's published works consist chiefly of treatises on astronomy and mathematics.

Walmesley is most famous for his General History of the Christian Church from her birth to her Final Triumphant States in Heaven chiefly deduced from the Apocalypse of St. John the Apostle, by Signor Pastorini (a pseudonym). This was first published in 1771 and went through ten editions in Great Britain and five more were produced in America. Translations of the work also appeared in Latin, French, German, and Italian, and were also reprinted. The book prophesied the end of Protestantism and particularly the destruction by God of the Anglican churches by 1825. It was popular with Irish Catholics in the years before the Act of Catholic emancipation in 1829.

An 1823 refutation by "Pastor Fido" (also a pseudonym) was titled: "Pastorini proved to be a bad prophet, and a worse divine".

William Carleton's popular short story, The Poor Scholar, quotes an Irish supporter of Pastorini speaking in Hiberno-English: "An', doesn't Pastorini say it? Sure, when Twenty-five comes, we'll have our own agin, the right will overcome the might – the bottomless pit will be locked – ay, double bolted, if St. Pether gets the kays, for he's the very boy that will accommodate the heretics wid a warm corner; an' yit, faith, ther's many o' them that myself 'ud put in a good word for, after all."

A number of his letters are in the archives of the Diocese of Clifton. Portraits exist at Downside, Douai Abbey, Clifton, and Lulworth.

== See also ==
- Catholic Church hierarchy
- Catholic Church in England and Wales
- Lists of patriarchs, archbishops, and bishops
- Roman Catholicism in England and Wales

== Sources ==
Catholic Church titles
Preceded by Lawrence William York	Vicar Apostolic of the Western District; 1770–1797	Succeeded by William Gregory Sharrock
