= William Sharrock =

William Gregory Sharrock, O.S.B. (1742–1809) was an English Roman Catholic bishop who served as the Vicar Apostolic of the Northern District from 1797 to 1809.

Born in Walton le Dale, Lancashire on 30 March 1742, he was ordained a priest of the Order of Saint Benedict in 1766. He was appointed the coadjutor to the Vicar Apostolic of the Western District on 30 September 1779 and consecrated the Titular Bishop of Telmissus on 12 August 1780. On the death of Bishop Walmesley on 25 November 1797, Bishop Sharrock automatically succeeded as Vicar Apostolic of the Western District.

He died in office on 17 October 1809, aged 67.

Catholic Church titles
Preceded by Charles Walmesley	Vicar Apostolic of the Western District; 1797–1809	Succeeded by Peter Bernardine Collingridge
