= Delabere Pritchett Blaine =

British veterinarian (1768–1845)

Delabere Pritchett Blaine (1768–1845) was an English veterinary surgeon and Professor of Animal Medicine.

== Biography ==
Blaine at one stage ran a veterinary infirmary in Wells Street, Oxford Street, London. From about 1812 he was in partnership there with William Youatt, for around 12 years; then Youatt took over the business.

He may have been a contributor to Rees's Cyclopædia. He is not in the Philosophical Magazine list, but in the Prospectus as writing on Veterinary Art and Sporting Life.

== Publications ==
- Anatomy of the Horse, 1799
- Canine Pathology, 1800
- The Outlines of Veterinary Art, 1802
- A Domestic Treatise on the diseases of Horses and Dogs, 1803
- Encyclopaedia of Rural Sports, 1840, second edition 1852 edited by Charles Bindley and others
