= William Ellis (secretary of state) =

English Jacobite, Secretary of State to James II in exile

Sir William Ellis (died 1732) was an English Jacobite, who was Chief Secretary for Ireland in the 1680s and Secretary of State to James II in exile.

== Life ==
Ellis was the second son of John Ellis, and was educated at Westminster School. He was elected to a studentship at Christ Church, Oxford, in 1665, and proceeded Bachelor of Arts (BA) 19 June 1669. He lost his studentship for accepting the degree of Master of Arts (MA) per literas regias at Cambridge in 1671, without having first obtained his grace in his own college; and, despite the intercession of William III, Prince of Orange, in whose train he had visited Cambridge, was never restored.

In 1676 he was appointed, along with his brother Welbore Ellis, customer, comptroller and searcher for the Irish provinces of Leinster and Munster; and while holding this sinecure acquired considerable property in Ireland. He acted as secretary to Richard Talbot, 1st Earl of Tyrconnell, on the latter's appointment to the lord-lieutenancy of Ireland in 1687, and was knighted.

At the Glorious Revolution he followed the fortunes of the House of Stuart. Accompanying James II to Ireland he was placed on his privy council and appointed one of the assessors of Dublin in April 1690. He was one of six Protestants to attend James's Patriot Parliament in 1689, representing St Johnstown. He was attainted in 1691, and his older brother John Ellis, to whom he owed money, gained possession of his Irish property. He later became secretary to James in his exile at St. Germain, and on his death in 1701 acted as treasurer to his son, the Old Pretender.

Ellis died a Protestant at Rome in the autumn of 1732, aged between 65 and 90. His name is in the registry at Protestant Cemetery, Rome but there is no stone.

Political offices
Preceded by Cyril Wyche	Chief Secretary for Ireland; 1682–1685	Succeeded by Paul Rycaut
Parliament of Ireland
Preceded by John Edgeworth; Sir Henry Piers, Bt	Member of Parliament for St Johnstown; 1689; With: Edmond Morres	Succeeded by Sir John Edgeworth; Alexander Fraser
