= Prior Park College =

Public school in Bath, Somerset, England

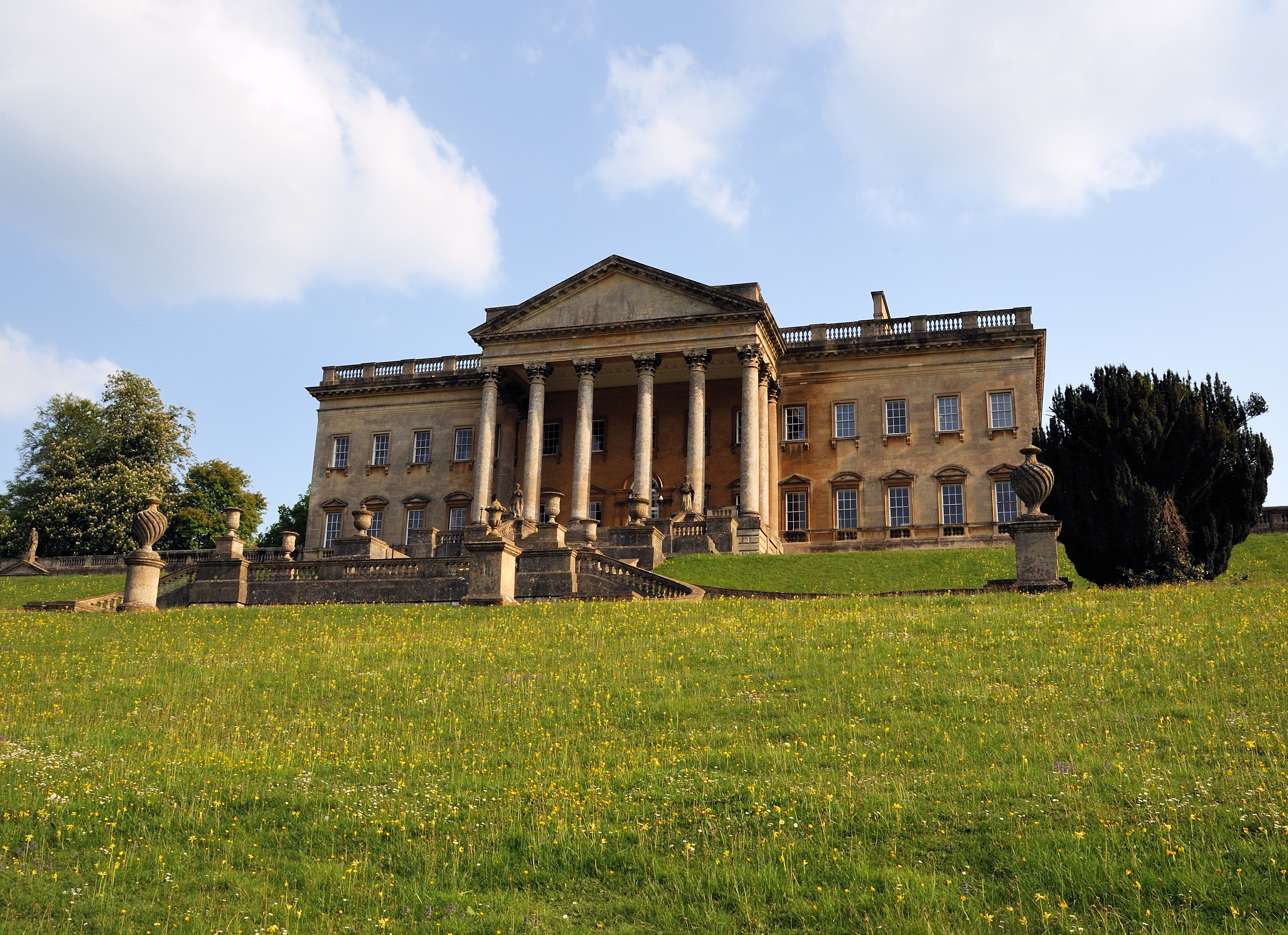

Location
- Ralph Allen Drive; Bath, Somerset, BA2 5AH; England; 51.3644°N 2.3431°W

Information
- Type: Public school Independent school Day, full boarding & weekly boarding school
- Motto: Latin: Deo Duce Deo Luce (God our Guide, God our Light)
- Religious affiliation: Christianity
- Established: 1830; 196 years ago
- Founder: Congregation of Christian Brothers
- Department for Education URN: 109347 Tables
- Chair: A M H King
- Headmaster: Ben Horan
- Gender: Mixed
- Age: 11 to 18
- Enrolment: 624
- Houses: Allen; Arundell; Burton; Clifford; English; Fielding; Roche; St Mary's; Baines; Brownlow
- Colours: Navy and Cyan
- Publication: Prior Knowledge
- Alumni: Old Priorites
- Website: www.priorparkcollege.com

Prior Park College is a co-educational public school for both boarding and day pupils in Bath, south-west England. Its main building, Prior Park, stands on a hill overlooking the city and is a Grade I listed building. The adjoining 57-acre (23 ha) Prior Park Landscape Garden was donated by Prior Park to the National Trust.

The school's parent body is Prior Park Schools, which also runs the Paragon Junior School (Bath) and Prior Park School Gibraltar.

== Overview ==
Prior Park College provides co-educational schooling for students aged 11 to 18. Founded in 1830 to be England's first Catholic university, it was established by the Benedictine, Bishop Baines, as a seminary. The school kept its links with the Catholic diocese – which meant pupils were required to study Religious Education to GCSE level – until 2024. By that time the proportion of students of the Catholic faith had decreased to 18%, and the school is now described as Christian.

In July 2009, Giles Mercer retired. He had been head teacher since 1996, and with his previous position as head of Stonyhurst College, he became the "longest serving Catholic senior school headmaster in England". His successor was James Murphy-O'Connor, nephew of former Prior Park pupil Cardinal Cormac Murphy-O'Connor. Since 2019, Ben Horan has been the headmaster, after Murphy-O'Connor took up a new position at the Monmouth Schools.

The school is part of the Prior Park Foundation which includes the Paragon Junior School, also in Bath, and Prior Park School Gibraltar, in the British overseas territory of Gibraltar.

== Architecture ==
The Palladian hillside mansion housing Prior Park College was designed and built by John Wood, the Elder in 1742. He was commissioned by Ralph Allen: "To see all Bath, and for all Bath to see". The mansion was designated as Grade I listed in 1950.

One wing of the mansion includes a chapel of our Lady of the Snows, built in 1863 by Scoles and Son, which is also Grade I listed; there is also a chapel in the original house. The chapel is unfinished, with the pillars at the back remaining unsculpted as they were in 1863.

== Landscape architecture ==
Prior Park Landscape Garden was laid out between 1734 and 1744, with the Allens benefiting during the first phase from the advice of their friend Alexander Pope. The Palladian bridge and the lake that it spans were added in 1755; the final phase with the green slopes from the house to the lake is thought to have been planned by Capability Brown in the 1760s. The garden is now owned by the National Trust.

== History ==
In 1828, Bishop Baines purchased the mansion for £22,000 and used it as a seminary named the Sacred Heart College. Renovations were made according to designs by H. E. Goodridge in 1834. The seminary was closed in 1856 after a fire in 1836 caused extensive damage and subsequent renovation caused financial insolvency. The estate was later bought by Bishop Clifford who founded a Catholic grammar school.

The chapel was designed by J. J. Scoles in 1844 but not completed until 1863. It followed 18th-century French models such as Chalgrin's St. Philippe-du-Roule in Paris. Pevsner describes it as "without any doubt the most impressive Chapel interior of its date in the county".

The grammar school closed in 1904 and the estate was occupied by the army during the First World War and by a series of tenants until 1921; the Christian Brothers founded a boys' boarding school in 1924. Prior Park College continues to occupy the main house. In 1993, 11.3 hectares (28 acres) of the park and pleasure grounds were acquired by the National Trust and have been extensively restored.

The mansion has been victim of fire twice. The 1836 event left visible damage to some stonework. A 1991 fire gutted the interior, except for parts of the basement; rebuilding took four years and cost about £6 million. Unusually, the blaze started on the top floor, and spread downwards. The school operated in the stables and former servants' quarters during the renovation.

== Facilities ==
Prior Park leases The Monument Field from the National Trust. The field is named after a triangular Gothic building with a round tower erected by Bishop Warburton, demolished in 1953; it had a circular staircase and contained a tablet inscribed in Latin in honour of Ralph Allen.

Since 2000, improvements include an indoor swimming pool, an Information and communications technology centre, and classroom extensions including the Mackintosh Dance Studio and Theatre (2006), the Design Centre (September 2016) and the Bury Sports Centre (April 2015). All sports facilities are located on site.

== Former preparatory school ==
In 1946 the Congregation of Christian Brothers opened a preparatory school linked to Prior Park College, at Calcutt Street, Cricklade, Wiltshire. The school's main building was the late-19th century Manor House, with extensive grounds. At first a boarding school for boys, the school admitted day boys in the 1970s. After the Brothers left Bath and Cricklade in 1980, the school was sold and came under lay management but kept its name, Prior Park Preparatory School. Later, girls were admitted, and the school catered for ages 3 to 13, with boarding available from age 7. In January 2015 there were 205 pupils.

Since September 2017, the school is no longer a member of the Prior Park Schools Educational Trust, although it retains strong links with the college. Its name changed to Cricklade Manor Prep and it is one of the Wishford Schools group of preparatory schools.

== Notable alumni ==
- Stephen Bowman, member of Brit Award winning band Blake
- Leonard Calderbank, Catholic priest
- Damian Cronin, Bath and Scotland rugby player
- Billy Drake, Battle of Britain fighter pilot
- Charles Kent (1823–1902), poet, biographer and journalist
- Peter Levi, University of Oxford educator
- Christopher Logue, poet
- Sir Ken Macdonald Director of Public Prosecutions of England and Wales, head of the Crown Prosecution Service
- Sir Cameron Mackintosh, British theatrical producer (formerly partnered with composer Sir Andrew Lloyd Webber)
- Gabriel Makhlouf, Governor, Central Bank of Ireland
- Cormac Murphy-O'Connor, Cardinal Archbishop of Westminster
- Michael Please, BAFTA winning animator
- John Patrick Savage, Canadian politician
- Hugh Scully, broadcaster
- David N. Thomas, marine biologist and polar researcher
- John Aloysius Ward, former archbishop of Cardiff
