= John Ellis (theologian) =

English clergyman

John Ellis (1606?–1681) was an English clergyman, known as the author of Vindiciæ Catholicæ.

== Life ==
He was Fellow of St. Catharine Hall, Cambridge, university proctor, and chaplain to Archbishop George Abbot. At the outbreak of the First English Civil War he took sides with the parliament, and was appointed to preach the fast sermon on 22 February 1643. His next work Vindiciæ Catholicæ was widely discussed. Samuel Hudson replied with ‘A Vindication’ in 1650.

By 1659, when holding a third portion of the rectory of Waddesdon, Buckinghamshire, Ellis become a royalist. In the preface to a short work ‘The Pastor and the Clerk; or a Debate (real) concerning Infant-Baptisme,’ published in June of that year, he regretted his contributions to the recent turmoil and the publication of Vindiciæ Catholicæ. He also announced his ‘Retractations and Repentings’ on the title-page. He was allowed to retain his living at the Restoration, and was presented by the king to the first and second portions of Waddesdon, 24 October and 8 November 1661, thus becoming sole rector.

Ellis was strongly attacked, especially by Henry Hickman in his ‘Apologia pro Ministris in Anglia (vulgo) Non-conformists,’ 1664. Ellis died at Waddesdon on 3 November 1681, aged 75, and was buried on the 8th in the north side of the chancel of the church, within the altar rails.

== Family ==
By his wife Susanna, daughter of William Welbore of Cambridge, he had eleven children: John Ellis, William Ellis, Philip Ellis, and Welbore Ellis, and five other children survived him. Mrs. Ellis died at Cambridge on 29 April 1700, aged 77.

== Notes ==
Attribution

This article incorporates text from a publication now in the public domain: "Ellis, John (1606?-1681)". Dictionary of National Biography. London: Smith, Elder & Co. 1885–1900.
