= Laurence York =

Laurence William York, O.S.B. (1687– 14 April 1770), was a Roman Catholic prelate who served as the Apostolic Vicariate of the Western District (England and Wales) from 1750 to 1770.

York was born in London in 1687, joined the Benedictine order and made his solemn profession as a monk at St. Gregory's College, Douay, on 28 December 1705. He was ordained a priest of the Order of Saint Benedict in 1711. He was prior of St. Edmund's, Paris (1721–5), and afterwards prior at St. Gregory's (1725–9). His services were required for the mission at Bath, Somerset in 1730.

York was appointed coadjutor to Matthew Pritchard, Vicar Apostolic of the Northern District on 13 May 1741, and consecrated the Titular Bishop of Nebbi (a former diocese of Numidia in North Africa) on 10 August 1741. On the death of Bishop Pritchard on 22 May 1750, Bishop York succeeded to the government of the Western District.

He retired on 11 July 1763, and died at St. Gregory's College, Douay, on 14 April 1770, aged 83. His portrait hangs in the refectory at Downside Abbey.

Catholic Church titles
Preceded by Matthew Pritchard	Vicar Apostolic of the Western District; 1750–1763	Succeeded by Charles Walmesley
