= Michael Ellis (bishop) =

English Benedictine monk and prelate

The Right Reverend Michael Ellis OSB
- Bishop of Segni
- Church: Roman Catholic Church
- Appointed: 3 October 1708
- In office: 28 October 1708 – 16 November 1726
- Predecessor: Pietro Corbelli
- Successor: Gianfrancesco De' Bisleti
- Previous posts: Titular Bishop of Aureliopolis in Asia (1688–1708); Vicar Apostolic of the Western District of England and Wales (1688–1704)

Orders
- Ordination: c. 1671
- Consecration: 6 May 1688 by Ferdinando d'Adda

Personal details
- Born: Philip Ellis; 8 September 1652 Waddesdon, Buckinghamshire, England
- Died: 16 November 1726 (aged 74) Segni, Papal States
- Buried: Chapel of the Seminary of Segni, Rome
- Denomination: Roman Catholic
- Parents: John Ellis & Susannah Welbore

Michael Ellis OSB (8 September 1652 – 16 November 1726) was an English Benedictine monk who was a prelate of the Catholic Church. He served as the first Vicar Apostolic of the Western District of England and Wales, and subsequently Bishop of Segni in Italy.

== Life ==
He was born Philip Ellis, the son of John Ellis, Rector of Waddesdon, Buckinghamshire, a descendant of the Ellis family of Kiddall Hall, Yorkshire, and Susannah Welbore. Of six brothers, John, the eldest, became Under-Secretary of State to William III of England; William, a Jacobite Protestant, was Secretary of State of James II of England in exile; Welbore became Protestant bishop of Kildare and afterwards of Bishop of Meath, Ireland; Samuel was Marshal of King's Bench; and Charles an Anglican clergyman.

Ellis, while still a Westminster schoolboy, was converted to the Catholic faith from his Anglicanism, and when 18 years old went to St Gregory Priory in Douai, France, where he was received as a monk, taking the religious name of Michael, making his religious profession on 30 November 1670. Receiving ordination shortly after, he returned in 1685 to serve in the English Mission, at which time he became one of the royal chaplains. In 1688 he was appointed vicar Apostolic of the newly created Western District and was consecrated by Ferdinando d'Adda, the papal nuncio (6 May).

During the Glorious Revolution of 1688 Ellis was imprisoned, but being soon liberated he retired to the Château de Saint-Germain-en-Laye in France and afterwards to Rome. In 1696 he was named an Assistant at the Pontifical Throne; in Rome his knowledge of English affairs made him so useful that his repeated petitions for leave to return to his vicariate were refused.

In 1704 Ellis resigned the vicariate, and in 1708 was made the Bishop of Segni by Pope Clement XI, being enthroned on 28 October. His first care was to rebuild the ruined Monastery of Santa Chiara and open it as a diocesan seminary. This he enriched with many gifts and a large legacy. A curious survival of his English title is an inscription at Segni to "Ph. M. Mylord Ellis". After his death, this became his resting place.

== Works ==
Eleven sermons preached in 1685 and 1686 before King James II, Queen Mary of Modena, and Queen Dowager Catherine of Braganza, were published in pamphlet form, some of which have been reprinted (London, 1741; 1772). The Acts of his synod at Segni in 1710 were also published by order of Pope Clement.

Catholic Church titles
New title	Vicar Apostolic of the Western District; 1688–1705	Succeeded by Matthew Pritchard
Preceded by Johann Bischopinck	Titular Bishop of Aureliopolis in Asia; 1688–1708	Succeeded by Daniele Delfino
Preceded by Pietro Corbelli	Bishop of Segni; 1726–1749	Succeeded by Gianfrancesco De' Bisleti
