= Matthew Pritchard =

Matthew Pritchard, O.F.M.Rec. (1669 – 22 May 1750) was a Roman Catholic bishop who served as the Vicar Apostolic of the Western District of England and Wales from 1713 to 1750.

Born at Graig, near Monmouth, south Wales in 1669, he was ordained a priest of the Order of Friars Minor in 1693. He was appointed the Vicar Apostolic of the Western District and Titular Bishop of Myra on 20 September 1713. He was consecrated to the Episcopate on 9 June 1715, however, there is no record who was his consecrator.

He resigned on 20 November 1744, but this resignation wasn't actualised and he died while in office con 22 May 1750, aged 81. Pritchard is buried in St Cenedlon's Church, Rockfield, just across the River Monnow from his home at Perth-hir House.

Catholic Church titles
Preceded by Philip Michael Ellis	Vicar Apostolic of the Western District; 1713–1750	Succeeded by Lawrence William York
