= Charles Bindley =

19th-century British sporting writer

- Occupation: Journalist

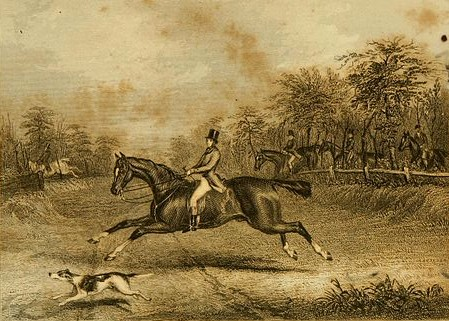
The author on his favourite Horse Harlequin, illustration to Charles Bindley's 1848 book The Pocket and the Stud, or Practical Hints for the Management of the Stable

Charles Bindley (1795/6–1859) was a British sporting writer, who concentrated on horses and field sports, particularly hunting and stable management. He became known under his pseudonym, Harry Hieover.

== Life ==
On his own account, Bindley's background included a fox-hunting father, service in Ireland, and sojourns mainly in Leicestershire and Lincolnshire. He wrote for a number of major sporting periodicals. In November 1858, in poor health, he left London for Brighton, where he was the guest of his friend Sir Thomas Barrett-Lennard, 2nd Baronet. He died there on 10 February 1859, aged 63.

== Works ==
Bindley published:

- Stable Talk and Table Talk, or Spectacles for Young Sportsmen, 2 vols. 1845–6
- The Pocket and the Stud, or Practical Hints for the Management of the Stable, 1848
- The Stud for Practical Purposes and Practical Men, 1849
- Practical Horsemanship, 1850
- The Hunting Field, 1850
- editor, Delabere Blaine's Encyclopædia of Rural Sports (1852)
- Bipeds and Quadrupeds, 1853
- Sporting Facts and Sporting Fancies, 1853
- The World: How to square it, 1854
- Hints to Horsemen: Shewing how to make Money by Horses, 1856
- Precept and Practice, 1857, reprinted articles from The Field
- The Sporting World, 1858
- Things worth knowing about Horses, 1859.

For Bentley's Miscellany Bindley wrote a fiction series, "The Two Mr. Smiths, or the Double Mistake".
