= Aureliopolis in Asia =

Aureliopolis
- District
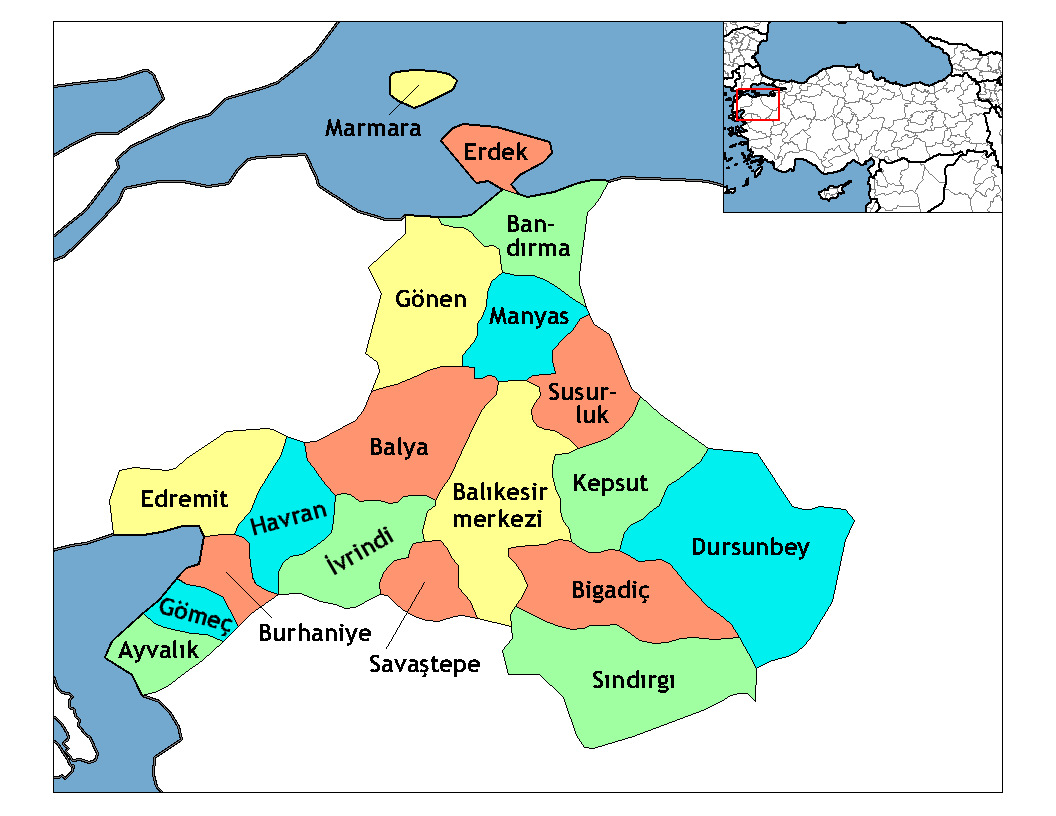
- Location within Turkey.

- Location of Freneli
- Coordinates: 39°33′N 27°06′E
- Country: Turkey
- Elevation: 147 m (482 ft)
- Time zone: UTC+2
  - Summer (DST): UTC+3

Aureliopolis in Asia is both a Roman era city and a vacant titular see located in the ecumenical province of Asia, in what is today Turkey.

== City ==
The Roman city (also known as Frenel and Evrenli), was located on the plain of Adramyttium at 39.5583N and 27.0983E. It was on the Freneli Çay river near the modern town of Havran in Balıkesir Province of Turkey. At times minted its own coins.

== Bishopric ==
- Alfonso Uribe Jaramillo (June 1963 – April 1968)
- Beniamino Nardone (Aug 1962 – Feb 1963)
- Nicola Canino (1951.04.11 – 1962.05.15)
