= Welbore Ellis (bishop) =

English bishop

Welbore Ellis (1651?–1734) was an English bishop of Kildare, bishop of Meath and Irish privy councillor.

== Life ==
He was the fourth son of the Rev. John Ellis (1606?–1681), rector of Waddesdon, and author of Vindiciæ Catholicæ; and brother to John Ellis, William Ellis and Philip Ellis. He was educated at Westminster School and at Christ Church, Oxford, where he graduated with a B.A. in 1684, an M.A. in 1687, and a B.D. and D.D. by diploma in 1697. In 1732, he received the ad eundem degree of D.D. from Trinity College, Dublin.

Welbore Ellis became a prebendary of Winchester in 1696. He was promoted in 1705, by patent dated 22 September, to the bishopric of Kildare, with the deanery of Christ Church Cathedral, Dublin in commendam, and was translated, 13 March 1731, to the bishopric of Meath, with a seat in the Irish privy council. He died on 1 January 1734, and was buried within the cathedral of Christ Church, Dublin, where a monument was erected.

He was also notable for having arranged for Edward Lovett Pearce to design Deanery House, one of the first Palladian houses in Dublin for the deans of the cathedral.

== Works ==
His publications are:

- ‘The Dean of Dublin, Plaintiff, Archbishop of Dublin, Defendant, upon a Writ of Error—the Defendant's Case,’ London, 1724.
- ‘The Lord Bishop of Kildare, Dean of the Church of the Holy Trinity of Dublin, Plaintiff in Error. The Lord Archbishop of Dublin Defendant in Error. The Plaintiff in Error's Case,’ London, 1724.

== Family ==
He married Diana, daughter of Sir John Briscoe, knt., of Boughton, Northamptonshire, and Amberley Castle, Sussex, and had, with other issue, Welbore, later Baron Mendip, and Anne, who married firstly Henry Agar of Gowran Castle, and secondly George Dunbar.
