= John Ellis (Harwich MP) =

English official and Member of Parliament

John Ellis (1643–1738) was an English official and Member of Parliament.

== Life ==
Born in or about 1643, he was the eldest son of John Ellis, author of Vindiciæ Catholicæ, by his wife Susannah, daughter of William Welbore of Cambridge. He received his education at Westminster School, and was elected student of Christ Church, Oxford, in 1664. At college he met Humphrey Prideaux, with whom he formed a lifelong friendship. Ellis did not take a degree, but obtained employment in the secretary of state's office.

In March 1672 he was under Sir Joseph Williamson in the paper office, Whitehall. On the promotion of Williamson to be secretary of state in the autumn of 1674 Ellis lost his situation. He obtained, however, the appointment of secretary to Sir Leoline Jenkins, one of the envoys chosen to attend the conference at Nijmegen, the Netherlands, and set out 20 December 1675. He was employed in this capacity until September 1677. His doings during this period of his life were set down in his Journal of Proceedings of the Nimeguen Conference, 1674–1677, and Note Book at Nimeguen, 1675–6. From 1678 to 1680 Ellis acted as secretary to Thomas Butler, 6th Earl of Ossory. At the beginning of 1680 he made another journey into the Netherlands to lay before the States-General the claims of Lord Ossory to the rank of general, which the latter had received from the Prince of Orange. He was successful in obtaining the necessary confirmation. After the death of Ossory in August 1680 Ellis became secretary to his father, James Butler, 1st Duke of Ormonde, then lord-lieutenant of Ireland. In October 1682 he received the appointment of secretary to the commissioners of the revenue of Ireland, a post he continued until the Glorious Revolution.

He left Dublin for England early in 1689, and his place at the Irish treasury was filled up by someone on the spot. Towards the end of 1689 he became secretary to James Butler, 2nd Duke of Ormonde, as he had been before to his father, the Earl of Ossory. Two years later he was one of the commissioners of transports, and finally under-secretary of state in May 1695. He filled for ten years the office of under-secretary to four successive secretaries of state; but after some misunderstanding with Sir Charles Hedges, he resigned in May 1705. William III had given him the place of comptroller of the Mint, worth £500 a year on 23 May 1701. The office was confirmed to him in the next reign by letters patent of 11 June 1702. In 1711 he was deprived of it by Robert Harley, and he petitioned to be reinstated at the accession of George I.

Ellis sat for Harwich, Essex, in the parliaments of 1702–5 and 1705–8, and in 1710 unsuccessfully contested Rye, Sussex. He died unmarried at his house in Pall Mall 8 July 1738, aged 95. By making use of opportunities while in office he had become wealthy.

== Legacy and reputation ==
He gave towards the buildings in Peckwater quadrangle at Christ Church, Oxford. To his Jacobite brother, Sir William Ellis (died 1732), he had lent £1,231, and in consideration of the debt he received a grant of the brother's forfeited estate in Ireland from William III. The estate having been ‘resumed’ and vested in trustees by the Act of Resumption (11 and 12 Will. III) ‘before he had received any benefit by it,’ Ellis in the next reign petitioned parliament for a bill of relief, and obtained it in May 1702. He died possessed of the estate.

Ellis left a large collection of letters addressed to him on both public and private matters. Two volumes of his correspondence during 1686, 1687, and 1688 were edited in 1829 by George Agar-Ellis, a descendant of his brother Welbore Ellis. Attention had already been drawn to the value of the manuscript by Sir Henry Ellis, who published some extracts in vol. iv., 2nd ser., of his Original Letters. In 1872 the trustees of the British Museum purchased from Thomas Parker, 6th Earl of Macclesfield a voluminous collection of Ellis's official and private correspondence and papers extending from 1643 to 1720. The letters from Humphrey Prideaux, ranging from 1674 to 1722, but with many gaps, were edited for the Camden Society in 1875 by Sir Edward Maunde Thompson. Ellis's letters to George Stepney, 1700–8, are in Additional MSS.

Ellis was one of the many lovers of the Duchess of Cleveland. His intrigue is mysteriously alluded to in six lines of Alexander Pope's Sober Advice from Horace, implying that, having offended the duchess by boasting of the intimacy, he was, at her instigation, castrated. In a poem called The Town Life he is singled out from certain disreputable company as "that epitome of lewdness, Ellys" (Poems on Affairs of State, ed. 1703–7, i. 192). There is also allusion to him in The Session of the Poets (ib. i. 210).

Parliament of England
Preceded by Sir Thomas Davall; Dennis Lydell	Member of Parliament for Harwich; 1702–1707; With: Sir Thomas Davall	Succeeded by Parliament of Great Britain
Parliament of Great Britain
Preceded by Parliament of England	Member of Parliament for Harwich; 1707–1708; With: Sir Thomas Davall	Succeeded by Sir John Leake; Thomas Frankland
