= Belville, County Westmeath =

Belville
- Townland
- Location of Belville within County Westmeath in the Republic of Ireland
- Coordinates: 53.439°N 7.818°W
- Country: Ireland
- Province: Leinster
- County: County Westmeath

Area
  - Total: 0.97 km^{2} (0.37 sq mi)
- Irish grid reference: N128425

Belville is a townland in County Westmeath, Ireland. It is located about 10 miles (16 km) east of Athlone.

Belville is one of a number townlands of the Irish civil parish of Ballyloughloe in the barony of Clonlonan in the Province of Leinster. The townland covers 242 acres (0.98 km^{2}).

In the 1911 census of Ireland, it was spelt "Bellville" and there were four houses and fourteen inhabitants in the townland.
