= Leonard Calderbank =

Roman Catholic canon

Rev Canon Leonard Calderbank (3 June 1809 – 24 June 1864) was a Roman Catholic priest and canon of Clifton.

He was the son of Richard and Jane Calderbank. He was born on 3 June 1809 at Standish, near Wigan, Lancashire. He was educated first at a school in his native village, and afterwards at Ampleforth College, in Yorkshire. In December 1829, he left Ampleforth and moved to Prior Park College, near Bath, Somerset. Thereafter, he went to complete his theological studies at Rome; where, on 11 November 1832, he was ordained to the priesthood.

He returned to England in 1833, and he was sent upon a mission in the Catholic Church's Western District, where he was placed successively at Trelawny; Tawstock, Devon; Weobley, Herefordshire; Poole, Dorset; and Cannington, Somerset.

In April 1839, he was appointed chaplain of the Convent of the Immaculate Conception, in Sion House, at Spetisbury, near Blandford Forum, Dorsetshire.

On 9 November 1849, he was recalled to Prior Park by Bishop Hendren, then Vicar Apostolic of the Western District. For nearly a year, he held at Prior Park the double position of vice-president and professor of theology at St Paul's College.

On 9 October 1850, he was again sent upon the mission, being appointed to the charge of the Catholic congregation of St. Peter's in the city of Gloucester. He was shortly afterwards installed as a canon of Clifton. As missionary rector (the then title for a parish priest) at Gloucester, he oversaw the construction of a new church and presbytery, the former of which was opened in March 1860.

== Death ==
Calderbank died of heart disease on 24 June 1864, aged 55.
