= Apostolic Vicariate of the Western District (England and Wales) =

Roman Catholic ecclesiastical jurisdiction in England & Wales (1688-1850)

The Apostolic Vicariate of the Western District

Location
- Country: England and Wales
- Territory: The English historic counties of Cornwall, Devon, Dorset, Gloucestershire, Somerset and Wiltshire, and until 1840 also all of the Welsh historic counties and the English historic county of Herefordshire

Information
- Denomination: Roman Catholic
- Rite: Latin Rite
- Established: 30 January 1688
- Dissolved: 29 September 1850

The Apostolic Vicariate of the Western District was an ecclesiastical jurisdiction of the Roman Catholic Church in England and Wales. It was led by a vicar apostolic who was a titular bishop. The Apostolic Vicariate of the Western District was created in 1688 and was dissolved in 1850 and replaced by two dioceses.

== History ==
=== Background ===
Soon after the accession of Queen Elizabeth I, the bishops of England were forced to choose between taking the Oath of Supremacy, thus denying the authority of the Pope, or losing their episcopal sees. Those who chose to continue their allegiance to Rome were subsequently deposed and replaced in their sees by priests of the Church of England. Most of the deposed bishops were imprisoned in various locations and died in captivity over a period of years, though some left the country and continued their work overseas. The last of the deposed bishops was Thomas Goldwell, Bishop of St Asaph, who died in Rome on 3 April 1585.

=== Restoration: Vicar Apostolic of England ===
In 1623, Pope Urban VIII decided once again to provide a bishop with jurisdiction in England. So it was that Dr William Bishop was appointed, with the title of Vicar Apostolic of England. He died shortly afterwards and was succeeded by Dr Richard Smith, who in August 1631 was forced to resign and fled to France. The office then remained vacant until its revival in 1685 with the appointment of Dr John Leyburn as bishop.

=== Geographical Organisation ===
In 1623, the first Apostolic Vicar, Dr Bishop, divided England into six areas and placed a superior at the head of each with the title of vicar general. This structure remained in place until Dr Leyburn reduced the number from six to four. It was on the basis of these four areas that on 30 January 1688 Pope Innocent XI increased the number of (titular) bishops in England to four. The territory of the former single Apostolic Vicariate was thereby reduced, becoming the Apostolic Vicariate of the London District. So it was that the Apostolic Vicariate of the Western District was created, along with the Apostolic Vicariate of the Northern District and the Apostolic Vicariate of the Midland District.

=== Apostolic Vicariate of the Western District ===
The Western District consisted of the English historic counties of Cornwall, Devon, Dorset, Gloucestershire, Herefordshire, Somerset and Wiltshire, and all of the Welsh historic counties. The first vicar apostolic of the Western District, with effect from 30 January 1688, was Bishop Philip Michael Ellis OSB, who resigned in 1705. He should have been succeeded by Andrew Giffard (brother of Bonaventure Giffard), however, he refused to accept the appointment. The next vicar apostolic in 1713, after an interregnum, was Matthew Pritchard O.F.M. In 1840, a general redivision of the vicariates took effect. Wales and Herefordshire formed the new Apostolic Vicariate of the Welsh District, and thenceforth the Western District consisted of the English counties in the south west only. Despite this last subdivision and intermittent persecution, an Apostolic Vicariate of the Western District existed until 29 September 1850 when Pope Pius IX issued the Bull Universalis Ecclesiae, by which thirteen new dioceses which did not formally claim any continuity with the pre-Elizabethan English dioceses were created, commonly known as the restoration of the English hierarchy. Among them was the diocese of Clifton, which, along with the new Diocese of Plymouth, was formed from the territory of the former Apostolic Vicariate of the Western District.

== Legacy - Dioceses of Clifton and Plymouth ==
Given that the Apostolic Vicars resided chiefly at Bath in Somerset, it was fitting that the last vicar apostolic of the Western District, Dr Joseph William Hendren (1791–1866), consecrated in 1848, should become the first Bishop of Clifton. Thus the new Clifton diocese was in continuity with the old vicariate.

In the early period from 1850 the Clifton diocese was a suffragan of the Metropolitan See of Westminster, but a further development was the creation under Pope Pius X, on 28 October 1911, of a new Province of Birmingham, to which Clifton then was transferred.

The archives of the Western District, one of the most important sources of information for the history of the Church in England from 1780 to 1850 are deposited in the archives of the diocese of Clifton.

The other half of the apostolic vicariate became the Diocese of Plymouth.

== List of the Vicars Apostolic of the Western District ==
Vicars Apostolic of the Western District
From	Until	Incumbent	Notes
1688	1705	Philip Michael Ellis, O.S.B. Titular Bishop of Aureliopolis in Asia	Appointed vicar apostolic and Titular bishop on 28 January 1688. Consecrated on 6 May 1688. Resigned as vicar apostolic in 1705. Afterwards appointed Bishop of Segni in Italy on 3 October 1708. Died on 16 November 1726.
1705	1713	Vacant	Andrew Giffard (brother of Bonaventure Giffard) was appointed Vicar Apostolic of the Western District and Titular Bishop of Centuriae on 7 September 1705, however, he refused to accept the appointment, and died on 14 September 1714.
1713	1750	Matthew Pritchard, O.F.M.Rec. Titular Bishop of Myra	Appointed vicar apostolic and titular bishop on 20 September 1713. Consecrated on 9 June 1715 and died on 22 May 1750.
1750	1763	Lawrence William York, O.S.B. Titular Bishop of Nebbi	Appointed Coadjutor vicar apostolic and titular bishop on 13 May 1741. Consecrated on 10 August 1741. Succeeded as vicar apostolic on 22 May 1750. Retired on 11 July 1763 and died on 14 April 1770.
1770	1797	Charles Walmesley, O.S.B. Titular Bishop of Rama(t(h)a)	Appointed coadjutor vicar apostolic and titular bishop on 15 June 1756. Consecrated on 21 December 1756. Succeeded vicar apostolic on 14 April 1770. Died in office on 25 November 1797.
1797	1809	William Gregory Sharrock, O.S.B. Titular Bishop of Telmissus	Appointed coadjutor vicar apostolic and titular bishop on 30 September 1779. Consecrated on 12 August 1780. Succeeded as vicar apostolic on 25 November 1797. Died in office on 17 October 1809.
1809	1829	Peter Bernardine Collingridge, O.F.M.Rec. Titular Bishop of Thespiae	Appointed coadjutor vicar apostolic and titular bishop on 13 January 1807. Consecrated on 11 October 1807. Succeeded vicar apostolic on 18 October 1809. Died in office in March 1829.
1829	1843	Peter Augustine Baines, O.S.B. Titular Bishop of Sigus	Appointed coadjutor vicar apostolic and titular bishop on 4 February 1823. Consecrated on 1 May 1823. Succeeded vicar apostolic on 3 March 1829. Died in office on 6 July 1843.
1844	1845	Charles Michael Baggs; Titular Bishop of Pella	Appointed vicar apostolic and titular bishop on 9 January 1844. Consecrated on 28 January 1844. Died in office on 16 October 1845.
1846	1848	William Bernard Ullathorne, O.S.B. Titular Bishop of Cabasa	Appointed vicar apostolic and titular bishop on 12 May 1846. Consecrated on 21 June 1846. Translated to the Central District on 28 July 1848.
1848	1850	Joseph William Hendren, O.F.M. Titular Bishop of Martyropolis	Appointed vicar apostolic and titular bishop on 28 July 1848. Consecrated on 10 September 1848. Became the first Bishop of Clifton on 29 September 1850.
In 1850, the Western District was dissolved and replaced by the dioceses of Clifton and Plymouth.

== See also ==
- Catholic Church in England and Wales
- Roman Catholicism in England and Wales
- Lists of patriarchs, archbishops, and bishops
- Catholic Church by country
- Catholic Church hierarchy
- Roman Catholic bishops

== Bibliography ==
- Brady, W. Maziere (1876). The Episcopal Succession in England, Scotland and Ireland, A.D. 1400 to 1875. Vol. 3. Rome: Tipografia Della Pace.
