= Canonical erection of a house of religious in the Catholic Church =

Aspect of canon law

The conditions for the canonical erection of a house of religious are indicated in canons 608-611 of the 1983 Code of Canon Law.

== Necessity of a canonical house for a religious community ==
A community of religious must live in a lawfully established house with a church or oratory in which the Eucharist is celebrated and reserved. The community is to have a superior designated in accordance with canon law.

The house in which the community resides is distinct from any farm or holiday home that they may also possess.

== Permissions required ==
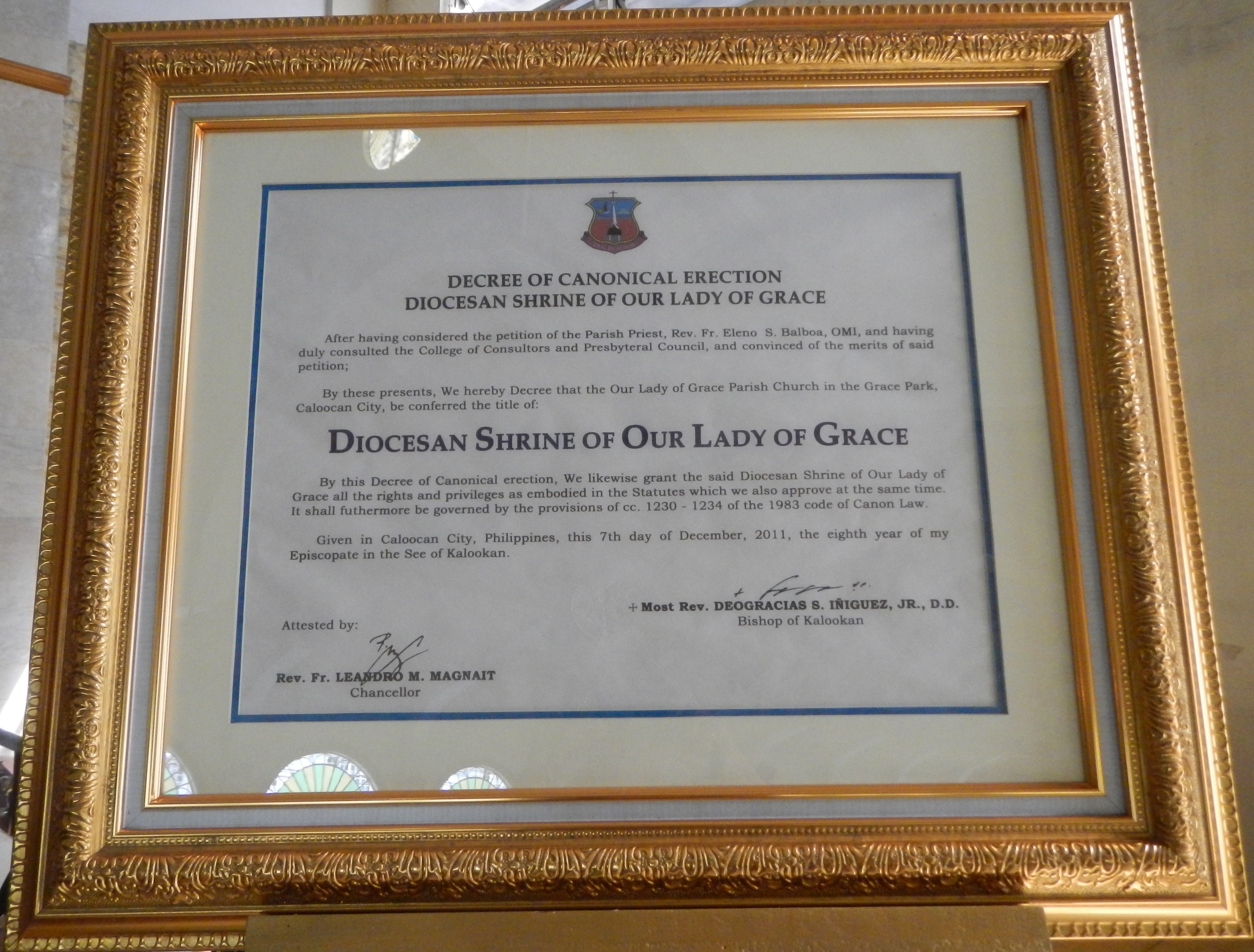
Decree of Canonical erection of a house of religious, Diocesan Shrine of Our Lady of Grace, Diocese of Kaloocan.

It is the superior indicated in the constitutions of the religious institute concerned (the superior general or the provincial) who is to establish the house after obtaining in writing the consent of bishop of the diocese. In addition, the permission of the Holy See is required for establishing a monastery of nuns. The word "nuns" applies in canon law to women religious whose vows are classified as solemn. These normally live a contemplative cloistered life of meditation and prayer. Other women religious do not need permission from the Holy See to establish a new house.

In 451, the Council of Chalcedon laid down the condition of the assent of the bishop. Privileges granted to the mendicant orders in the 13th century caused frequent derogations from the law, but the Council of Trent restored the ancient discipline (Sess. XXV, de Reg., cap. iii). The term used in the Code of Canon Law is "bishop", not "ordinary". Accordingly, the required permission cannot be given by a vicar-general or a diocesan administrator. The permission of the parish priest of the place is not required.

== Conditions ==
Consideration must be given to the advantage that is to accrue to the Church and the religious institute from establishment of the house and to the requirements for the members to live their religious life properly. A prudent judgment that the sustenance of the community will be provided for is also a condition.

== Effects ==
Once it has obtained the consent of the bishop for the establishment of the house, the religious community has the right

1. to lead a life that accords with the character and proper purposes of the institute;
2. to exercise in accordance with canon law the works proper to the institute while observing any conditions that the bishop has attached to his granting of consent;
3. for clerical institutes to have a church in a place agreed on with the bishop and to perform sacred ministry in accordance with canon law.
