= Diocese of Pella =

Diocese

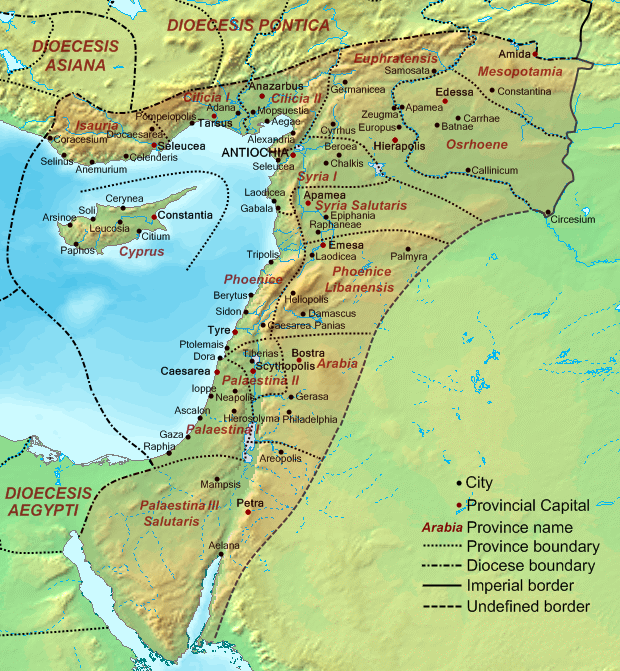
Dioecesis Orientis 400 AD

Pella in Palaestina is an ancient and titular diocese of the Roman Catholic Church also called the Diocese of Khirbet El-wahadneh, and it is centered on Pella, Jordan.

== History ==
Pella was an ancient bishopric in with a Christian community from before 70 AD.

Zebennus of Pella

It was a titular see by the time Michel Le Quien wrote.

== Bishops ==
=== Known ancient bishops ===
- Zebenus

=== Titular Catholic bishops ===
- Hieronim Maciej Jełowicki (21 Feb 1725 Appointed – 8 Jan 1732 )
- Stefan Olshavskyi (20 May 1735 Appointed – 24 Dec 1737 )
- Bartolomeo Antonio Passi (28 Sep 1744 Appointed – 23 Jul 1774)
- Johann Nepomuk August Ungelter von Deisenhausen (12 Jul 1779 Appointed – 26 Feb 1804 )
- Johann Nepomuk von Dankesreither (24 Aug 1807 Appointed – 23 Sep 1816)
- Ignaz Bernhard Mauermann (14 May 1819 Appointed – 14 Sep 1841)
- Charles Michael Baggs (9 Jan 1844 Appointed – 16 Oct 1845)
- Jean-Pierre Dalmond (28 Jan 1848 Appointed – )
- Alexandre-Hippolyte-Xavier Monnet (3 Oct 1848 Appointed – 1 Dec 1849)
- Gustavo Leonardo de Battice (28 Dec 1877 Appointed – 13 Aug 1889)
- François-Nicolas-Alphonse Kunemann (27 Feb 1901 Appointed – 20 Mar 1908 )
- Thomas Kurialachery (30 Aug 1911 Appointed – 21 Dec 1923 Appointed, Bishop of Changanacherry (Syro-Malabarese))
- William Francis Brown (29 Jan 1924 Appointed – 16 Dec 1951)
- Pedro Grau y Arola (24 Mar 1953 Appointed – 4 Mar 2002)

== See also ==
- Catholic Church in Jordan
