= Hugh Jefferies =

British philatelist

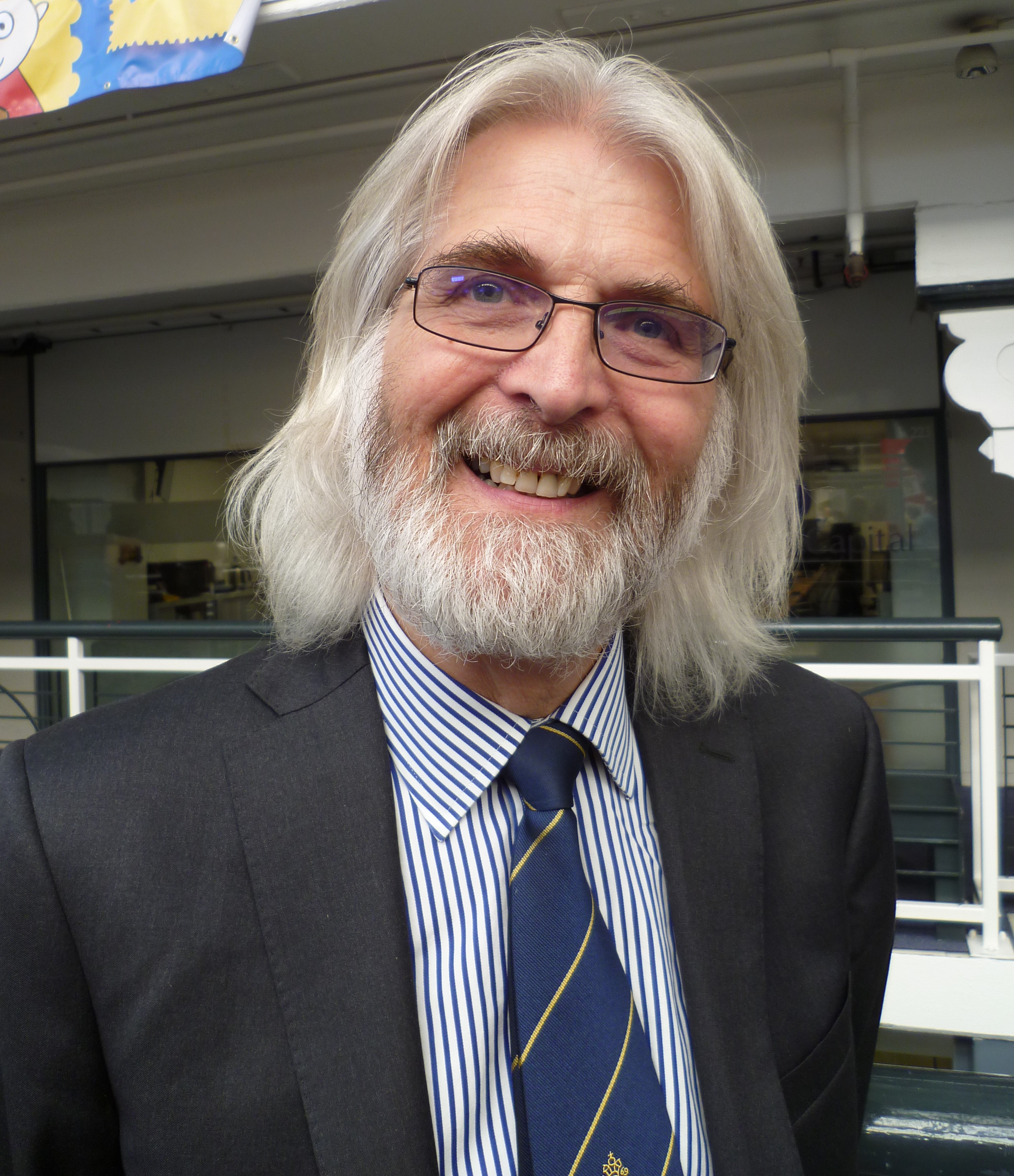
Hugh Jefferies at Autumn Stampex 2016.

Anthony Hugh Mostyn Jefferies, MBE, (born May 1948) is a British philatelist, the former editor of Gibbons Stamp Monthly, and the current editor of the Stanley Gibbons stamp catalogue.

== Early life ==
Anthony Hugh Mostyn Jefferies was born in Berlin in May 1948.

== Career ==
Jefferies joined Stanley Gibbons in 1975 and in 1988 became editor of Gibbons Stamp Monthly. In 2003 he became the editor of the Stanley Gibbons catalogue on the retirement of David Aggersberg. He has since retired as editor of the magazine but continues as editor of the catalogue. He was made a member of the Order of the British Empire (MBE) in 2015 for services to philately.

Jefferies is a trustee of the Bath Postal Museum, a Fellow of the Royal Philatelic Society London and a member of the Ferndown & West Moors Philatelic & Postcard Club.
