= Bathampton Down =

Limestone plateau in Somerset, England

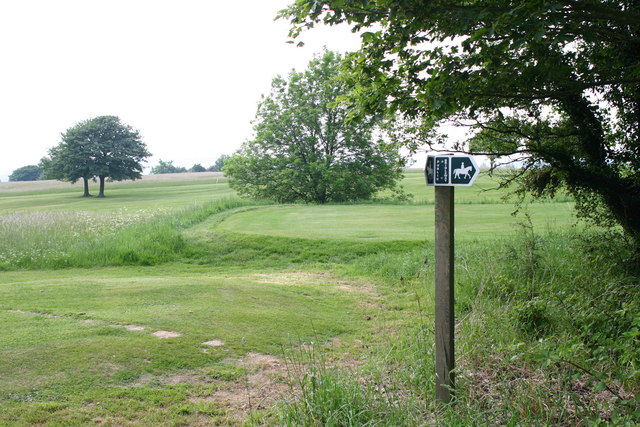
- Footpath on Bathampton Down

- Location within Somerset
- 51.3847°N 2.3262°W
- Location: Bathampton, Somerset, England

History
- Built: Bronze Age – Iron Age

Site notes
- Area: 15 acres (6.1 ha)

Scheduled monument
- Official name: Bathampton Camp

Bathampton Down is a flat limestone plateau near Bathampton, Somerset, England, overlooking the River Avon and the city of Bath. There is evidence of human activity at the site since the Mesolithic period, including Bathampton Camp, an Iron Age hillfort or stock enclosure. It has also been used for quarrying, and part of it is now a golf course.

== Geography ==
The plateau is formed from the Greater Oolitic Limestone with formations including Forest Marble, Bath Oolite, Twinhoe Beds and Combe Down Oolite. The limestone dates from the Middle Jurassic with deposits of flint quartz and sandstone, mainly preserved in fissures or other cavities dating from the Middle Pleistocene. The limestone is porous which, along with the flat nature of the plateau means there are no streams or rivers, particularly as several cold springs on Bathampton Down were diverted into reservoirs in the late 18th and early 19th centuries having originally flowed down to the River Avon.

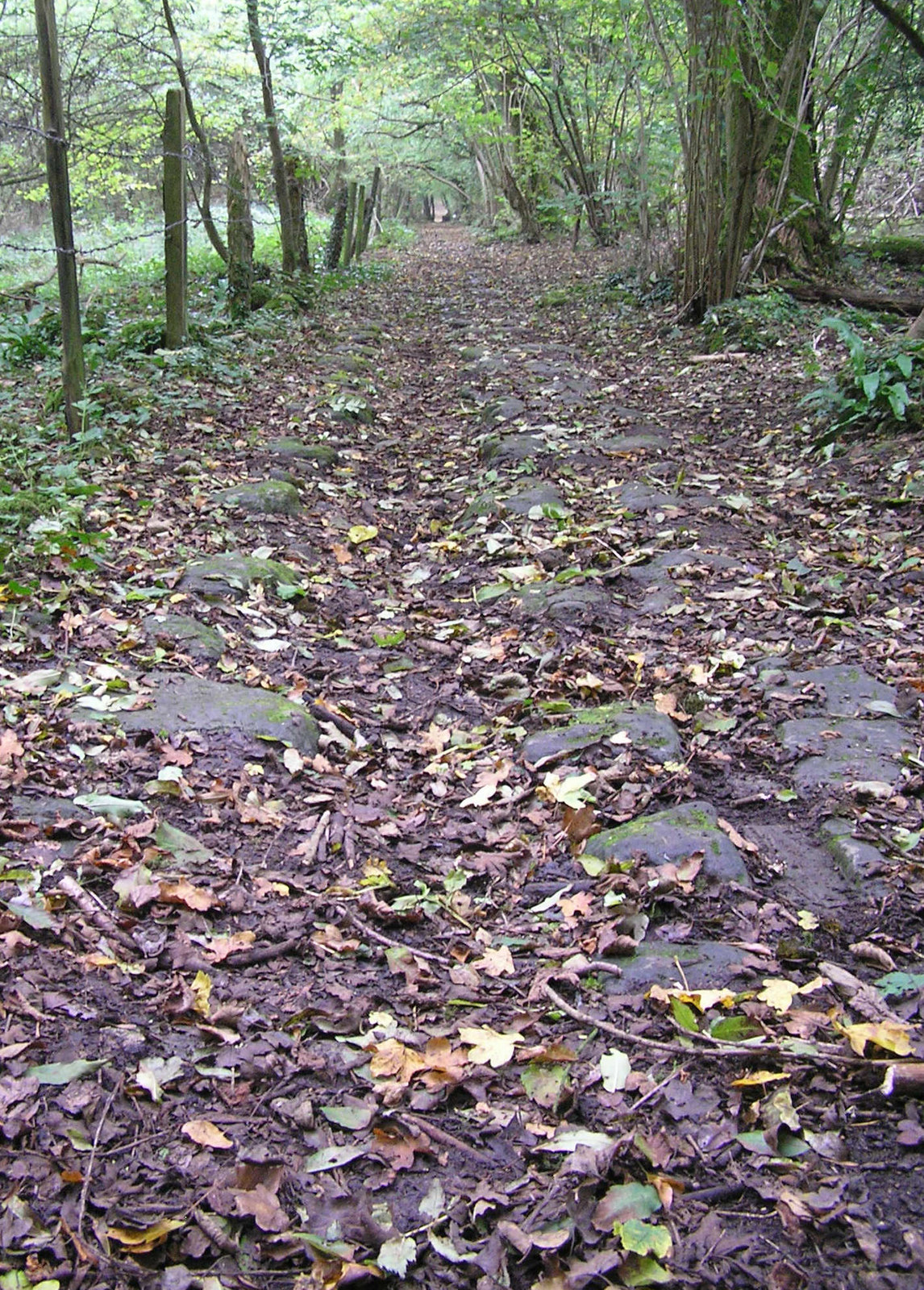
Remains of the tramway

The southern area merges with Claverton Down and lies above part of the Combe Down and Bathampton Down Mines Site of Special Scientific Interest, designated because of the Greater and Lesser Horseshoe bat population. There are small disused quarries which used to obtain Bath stone between the Roman era and the 18th century. Several of these can be seen on the golf course and other have left workings which run under the fairways. The entrance to the Seven Sisters' Quarry was blown up in the 1960s, although the remains of the tramway used to carry stone down to the Canal can still be seen.

At the highest point is a Triangulation station at a height of 204 metres (669 ft) above sea level, which provides views over the city and surrounding countryside.

The northern slopes between Bathampton Down and the River Avon have been built on and are traversed by the A36. To the east is Bathampton Wood separating the plateau from the road, River Avon, Kennet and Avon Canal and the Great Western Main Line. "Bathampton Rocks", an outcrop of rock, was the site of the Bathampton Patrol (Auxiliary Units) Operational Base during the Second World War. To the south and east are Claverton Down and the site of the University of Bath.

== History ==
=== Prehistoric ===
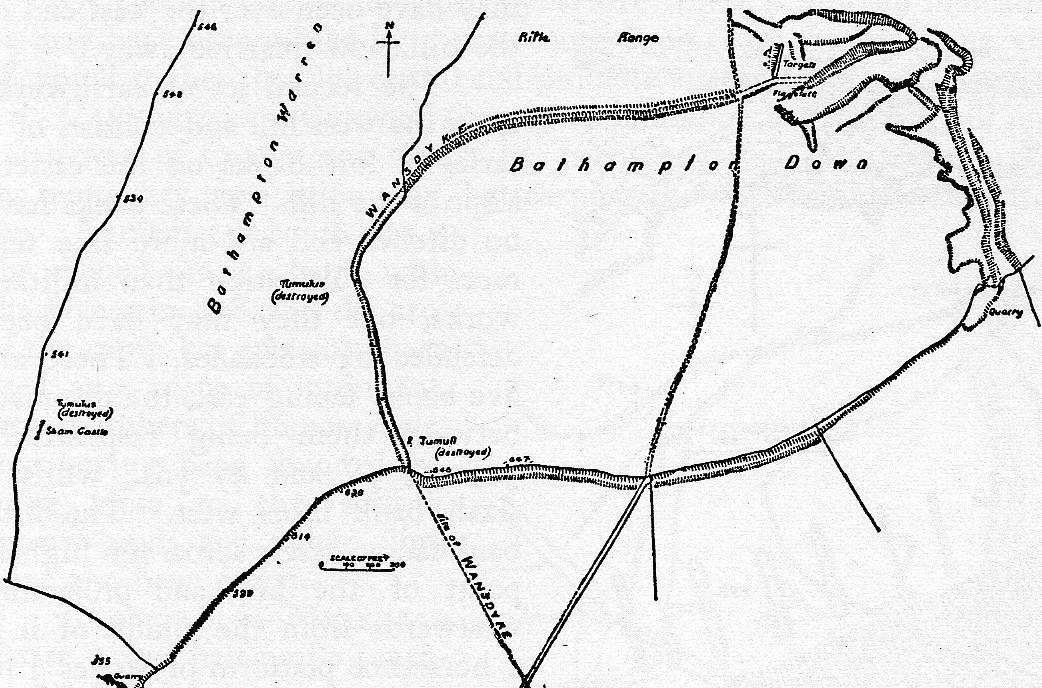
Wansdyke and other earthworks at Bathampton Down

The first evidence of human activity is from the Mesolithic period and consists of a dispersed collection of flint finds, including hammerstones, cores, fragments of axes and arrowheads. The remains of a stone circle were described in the 19th century; however no evidence remains.

Four Bronze Age round barrows (tumuli) have been reported. There are also tentative findings of a probable bowl barrow and a possible confluent barrow. In one round barrow a small burial urn was recovered. Many of the barrows were opened by John Skinner in the 18th century.

Bathampton Camp may have been a univallate Iron Age hill fort or a stock enclosure. A rectangular enclosure approximately 650 metres (2,133 ft) (east-west) by 500 metres (1,640 ft) (north-south) has been identified, which may be a medieval earthwork. The eastern side needs no protection, because the ground falls away steeply to the River Avon, 170 metres (558 ft) below. There is a single rampart and flat-bottomed ditch on the other three sides (univallate).

The site was excavated in 1904–5 and 1952–4. Human and animal remains were found, as well as pottery and flint flakes. Small fragments of pottery were found during excavations in the 1960s which have been dated to the Late Bronze Age or Early Iron Age. The area is a scheduled monument.

During the Iron Age, the area surrounding the camp had a settled agrarian landscape. There is a network of Celtic fields of some 0.4 hectares (0.99 acres) around the area now covered by the golf course. These are difficult to date but are thought to originate in the Iron Age and may have still been in use into the Roman era. The area to the south east, which is known as Bushey Norwood and includes part of the ramparts and some surviving upright stones, was given to the National Trust by Miss M. E. Mallett in 1960.

=== Roman ===
There is some evidence of a small Roman villa, although the area is more noted for funerary activity with two Romano-British stone coffins being found in 1794 and 1824, both containing inhumation remains.

=== Medieval ===
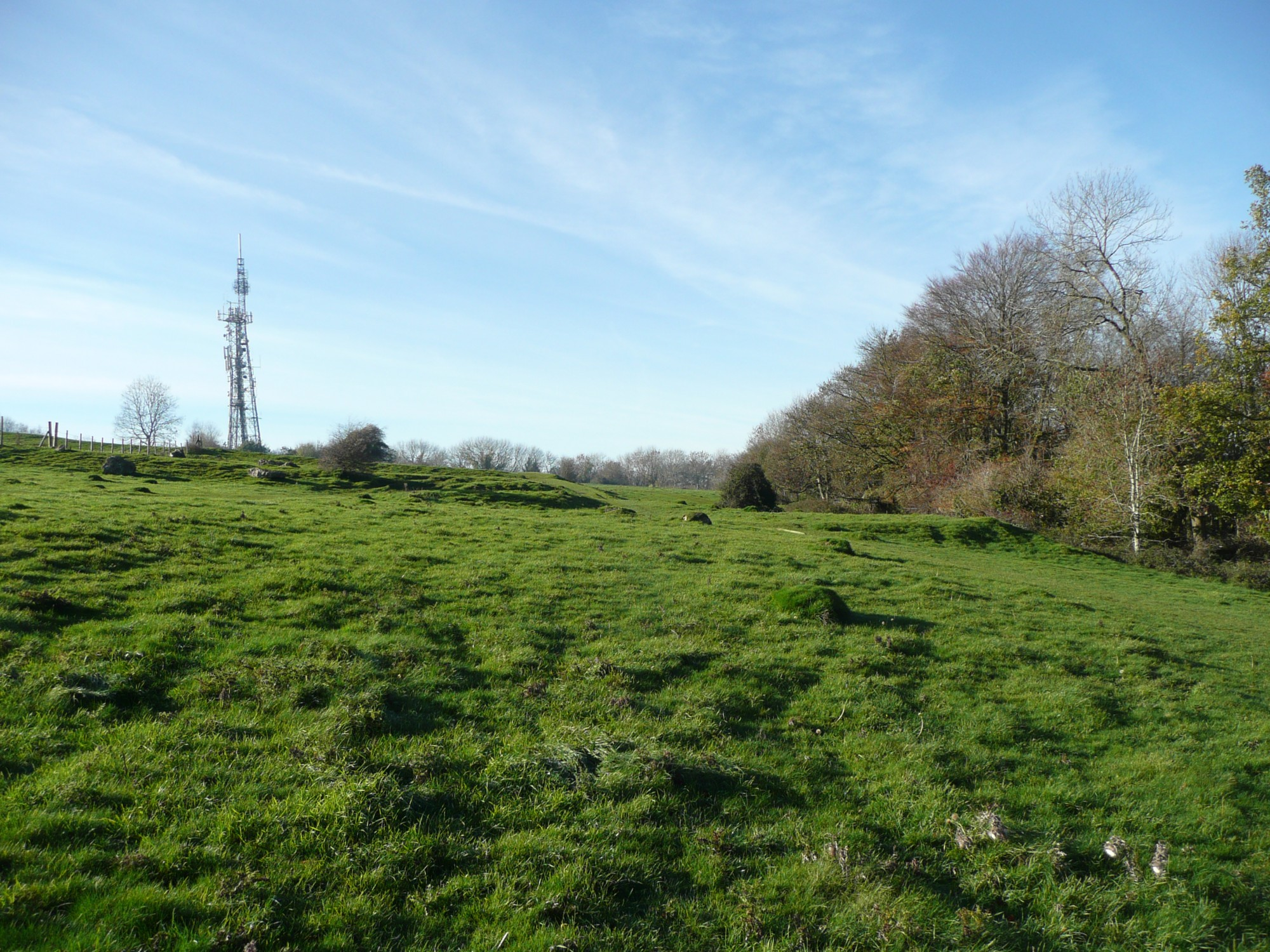
Earthworks with the telecommunications tower in the background

For many years it was thought that the earthworks were a part of the Wansdyke, but it is now thought improbable that Wansdyke crossed Bathampton Down. There is stronger evidence of agrarian activity with extant strip lynchets to the west of Bathwick Wood. There are also several pillow mounds, used as artificial rabbit warrens, in the area known as Bathampton Warren; these date from 1256 when Henry III gave the right to hunt small game to the Bishop of Bath and Wells.

On the basis of Monmouth's 12th-century work Historia Britanniae, Bathampton Down is one of the sites considered as a possible location for the Battle of Mons Badonicus, the traditional site of legendary King Arthur's decisive victory over the Saxons. However, there is no mention of the battle in the scheduled monument listing.

=== Modern ===
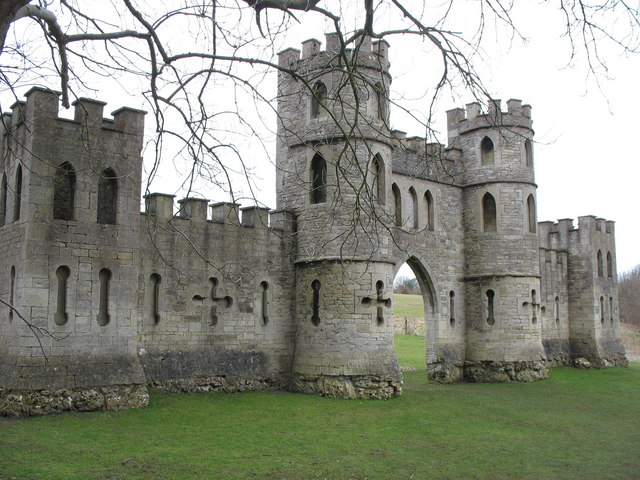
Sham Castle

Sham Castle, a folly on the western edge of Bathampton Warren, was probably designed around 1755 by Sanderson Miller and was built in 1762 by Richard James, master mason for Ralph Allen, "to improve the prospect" from Ralph Allen's town house in Bath. It is a Grade II* listed building. It consists of a single screen wall with a central pointed arch, flanked by two 3-storey circular turrets, which extend sideways to a 2-storey square tower at each end of the wall. Sham Castle is illuminated at night.

There is a telecommunications mast across the far side of the golf course from Sham Castle.

Around 1730, at the north-east corner of Bathampton Camp, a limestone quarry was opened by Ralph Allen, to provide local cut Bath stone for buildings in Bath. Its use declined by the end of the 18th century, but between around 1800 and 1895 it reopened to supply stone for the Kennet and Avon Canal, the stone being lowered down an inclined plane gravity tramway to the water.

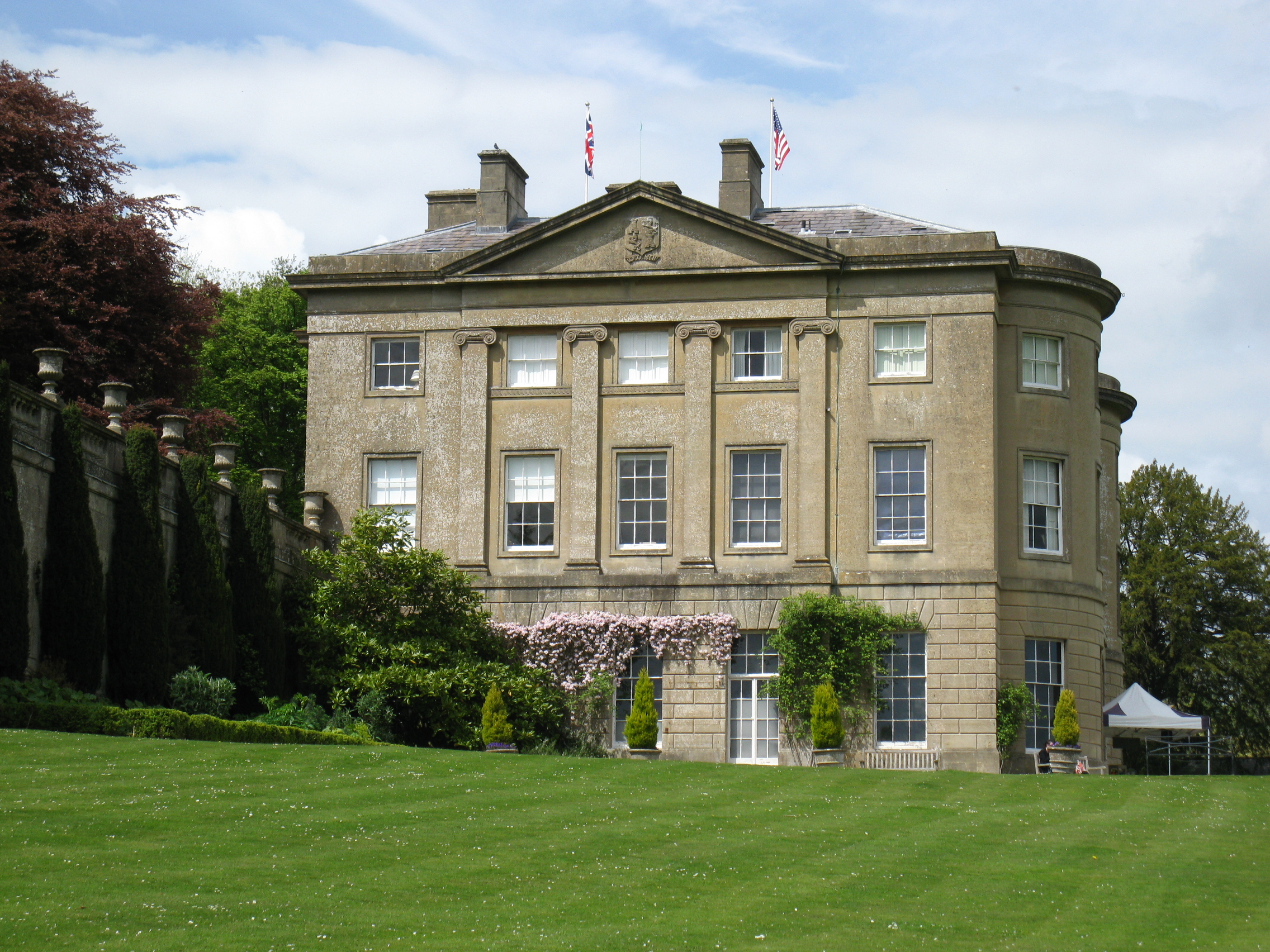
The American Museum at Claverton Manor

On the southern slopes are the American Museum and Gardens, at Claverton Manor, a house designed by Jeffry Wyatville and built in the 1820s on the site of a manor bought by Ralph Allen in 1758. It is now a Grade I listed building.

A drinking water reservoir was constructed on the down in 1955, although the land had originally been purchased by the City Council of Bath in 1928.

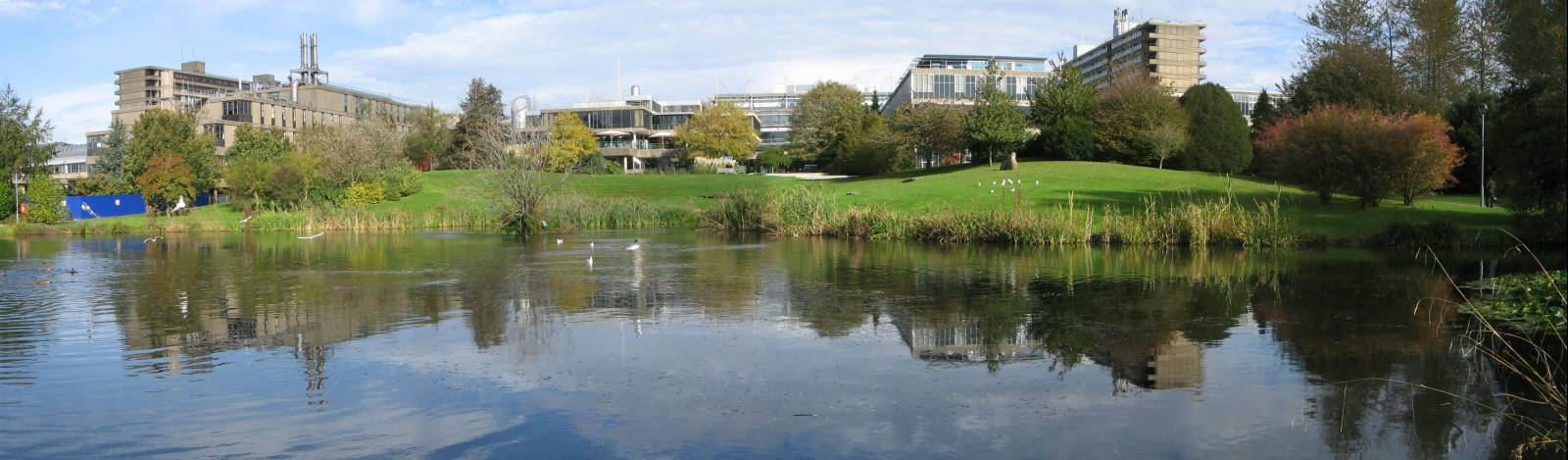
The University of Bath campus

The area is now part of a golf course behind the University of Bath. Construction of the campus began in 1964, with the first building, now known as "4 South", completed in 1965, and an artificial lake constructed. Over the subsequent decade, buildings were added as the campus took shape. The eastern part of the campus is dominated by the Sports Training Village, built in 1992 and enhanced in 2003 with an extension. A proposal to move the boundary of the Green Belt" surrounding the town from where it crosses the campus to its edge, to facilitate further development area for the university, was agreed in October 2007, by the local council for Bath and North East Somerset following a public inquiry. Over several years, the Bath University grounds have received recognition for their outstanding beauty with awards from groups such as Bath in Bloom.

== See also ==
- List of hillforts and ancient settlements in Somerset
