= Bath Skyline =

Circular trail in Somerset, England

Coordinates: 51.3783°N 2.3454508°W

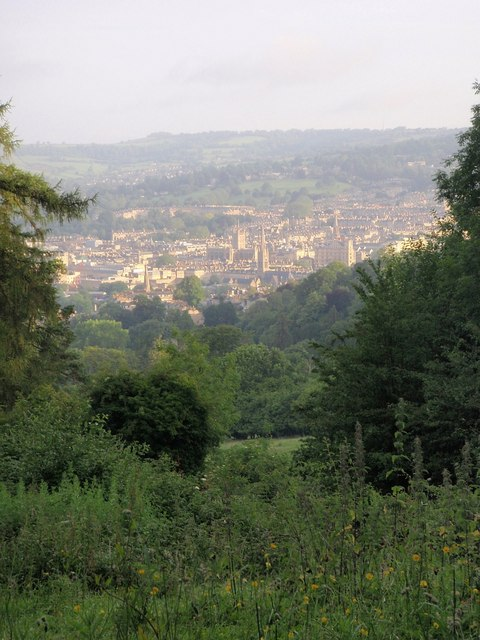
View from Bath Skyline

Bath Skyline is a circular trail that affords views of the historic city of Bath in England. It is managed by the National Trust.

== Route ==
The trail is located on high ground to the east of the city centre of Bath, a World Heritage Site, allowing unique views of the city and its buildings. It is 6 miles (10 km) in length. The route passes through or near numerous landmarks including Bathwick Hill, Bathampton Down, Prior Park Landscape Garden, Richens Orchard, Smallcombe Cemetery, Bathampton Woods and Sham Castle. The Iron Age fort on Little Solsbury Hill is also visible from the route. Part of the trail has been adapted in order to be accessible to wheelchairs.

== Facilities ==
The route is managed, with hedges and trees cut to ensure they do not become overgrown. There are guided walks, forest schools and seasonal events. There is a children's play area set in the woods at Claverton Down. Bath Skyline Parkrun takes place on the route, starting near Prior Park Landscape Garden.
