= Anthony Walker (artist) =

English printmaker and artist (1726–1765)

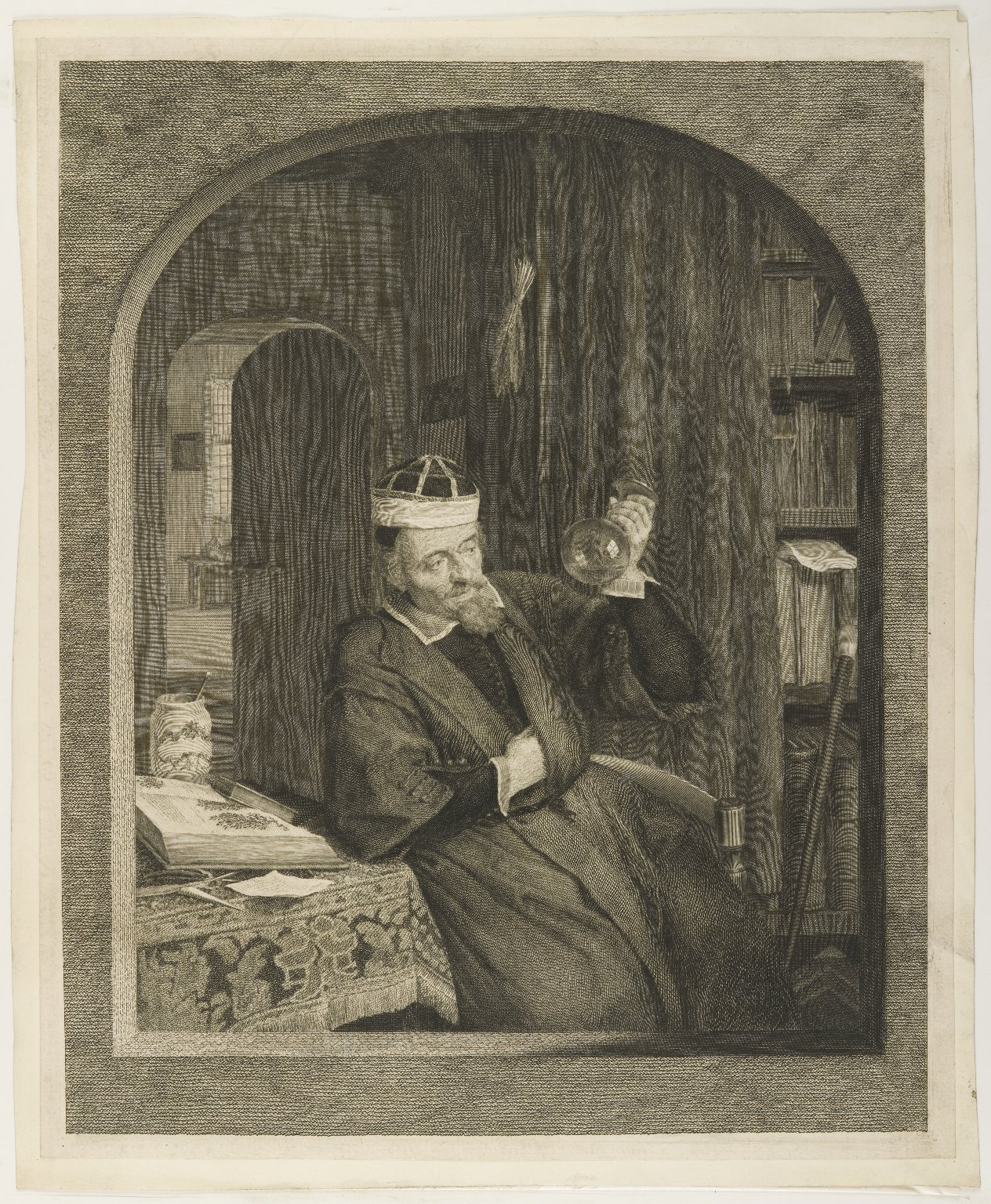
Physician examining a urine specimen.

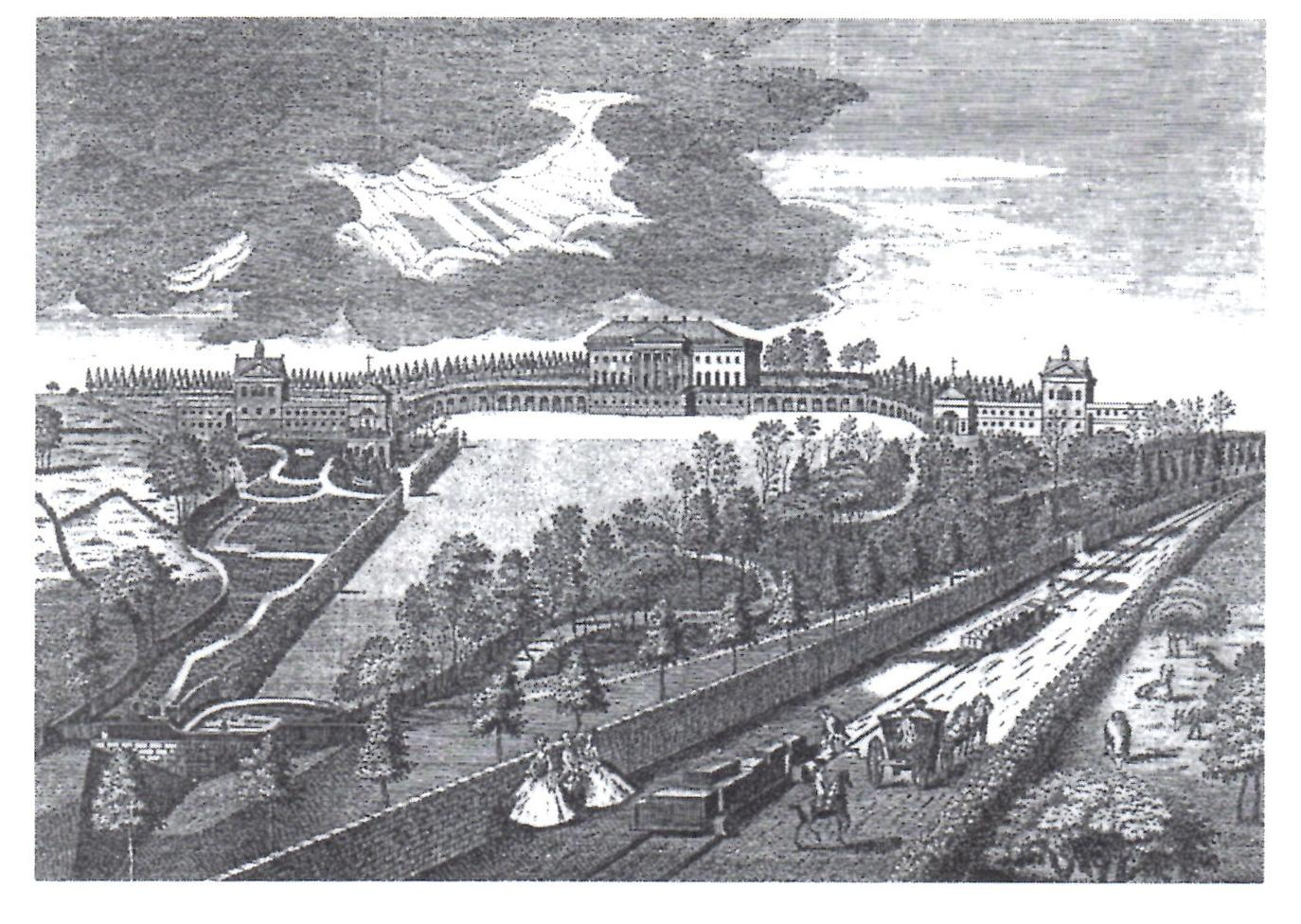
Prior Park, Bath and Ralph Allen's railway in 1750 from an engraving by Anthony Walker

Anthony Walker (1726 – 1765) was an English printmaker and artist. Many of his works can be seen at the Tate Gallery in London. He was also a renowned drawing artist.

Walker served an apprenticeship to John Tinney, who produced topographical plates. Much of his early signed work was engravings after his own drawings for the book trade. Later, he became a sought-after engraver of large single-issue prints, including five after Old Master paintings for John Boydell. Walker also produced illustrations for instructional books, such as The Complete Drawing Book (London, 1757).

His brother, William Walker, was an engraver.
