= Ralph Allen's Town House =

House in Bath, England

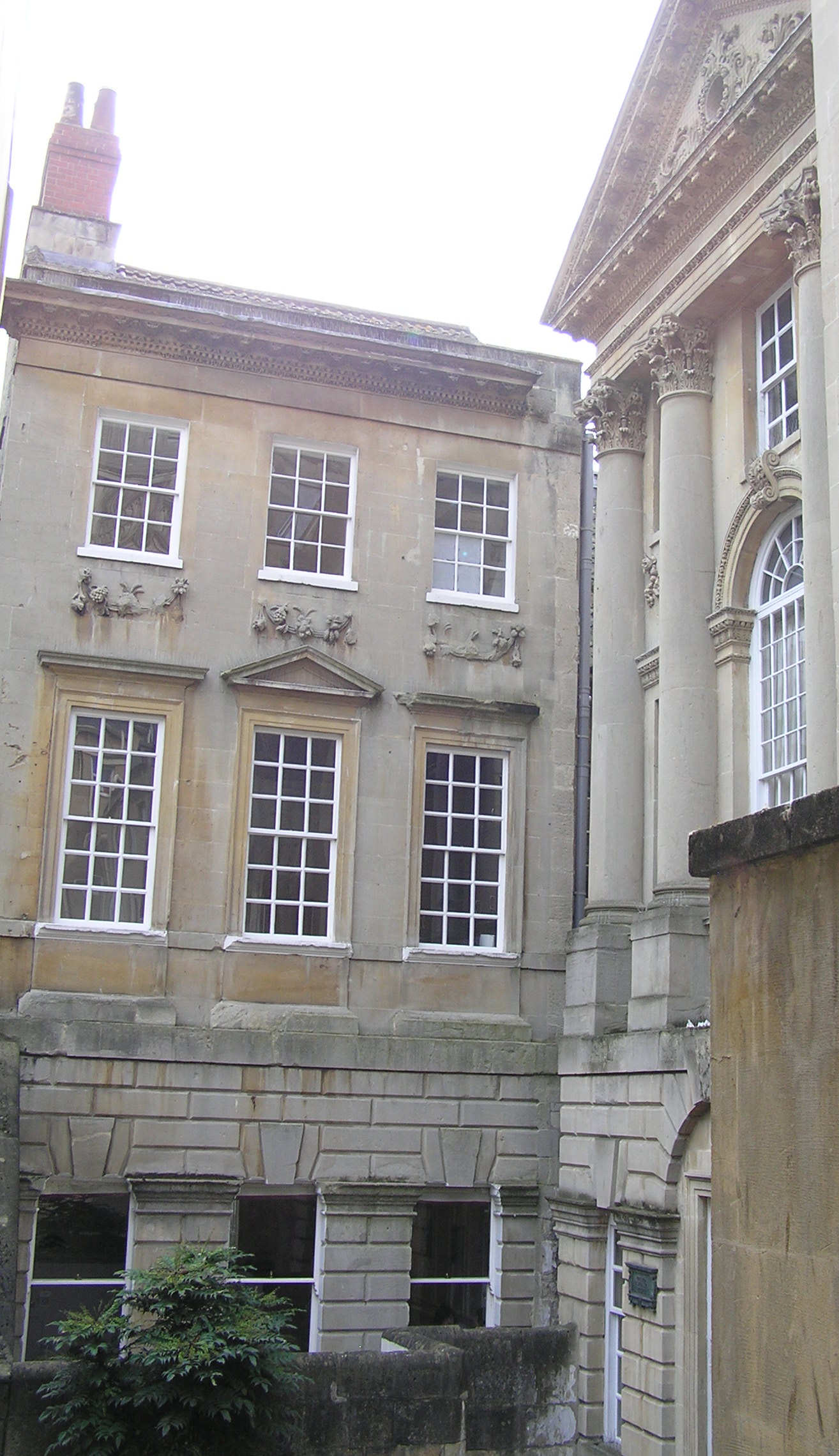

- Location within Somerset
- Former names: The Post House, The Old Post House
- Alternative names: Ralph Allen's House

General information
- Location: Bath, England
- Coordinates: 51.3808°N 2.3586°W
- Construction started: 1727
- Client: Ralph Allen

Design and construction
- Architect: John Wood, the Elder or Burlington

Ralph Allen's Town House is a grade I listed townhouse in Bath, Somerset, England.

Ralph Allen commenced building it in or shortly after 1727, although it is unlikely he ever lived there. At the time Allen was living in Lilliput Alley, in a house of some 15 rooms, then known as "Lease 7 on the Kingston rental (Countess of Kingston on Hull)", which is now 1 and 2 North Parade Passage. In 1745, Allen moved to Prior Park. His brother Phillip took over the Kingston Lease and continued to run the Postal business.

Opinion is divided as to whether John Wood the Elder designed the "Town House", however the ostentatious decoration is not a style he uses elsewhere in Bath. Richard Boyle, 3rd Earl of Burlington, has also been suggested as the architect. The enhanced decoration with rustication, Corinthian pillars and decorated pediment may have been incorporated purely to demonstrate the fine carving qualities of Bath Stone.

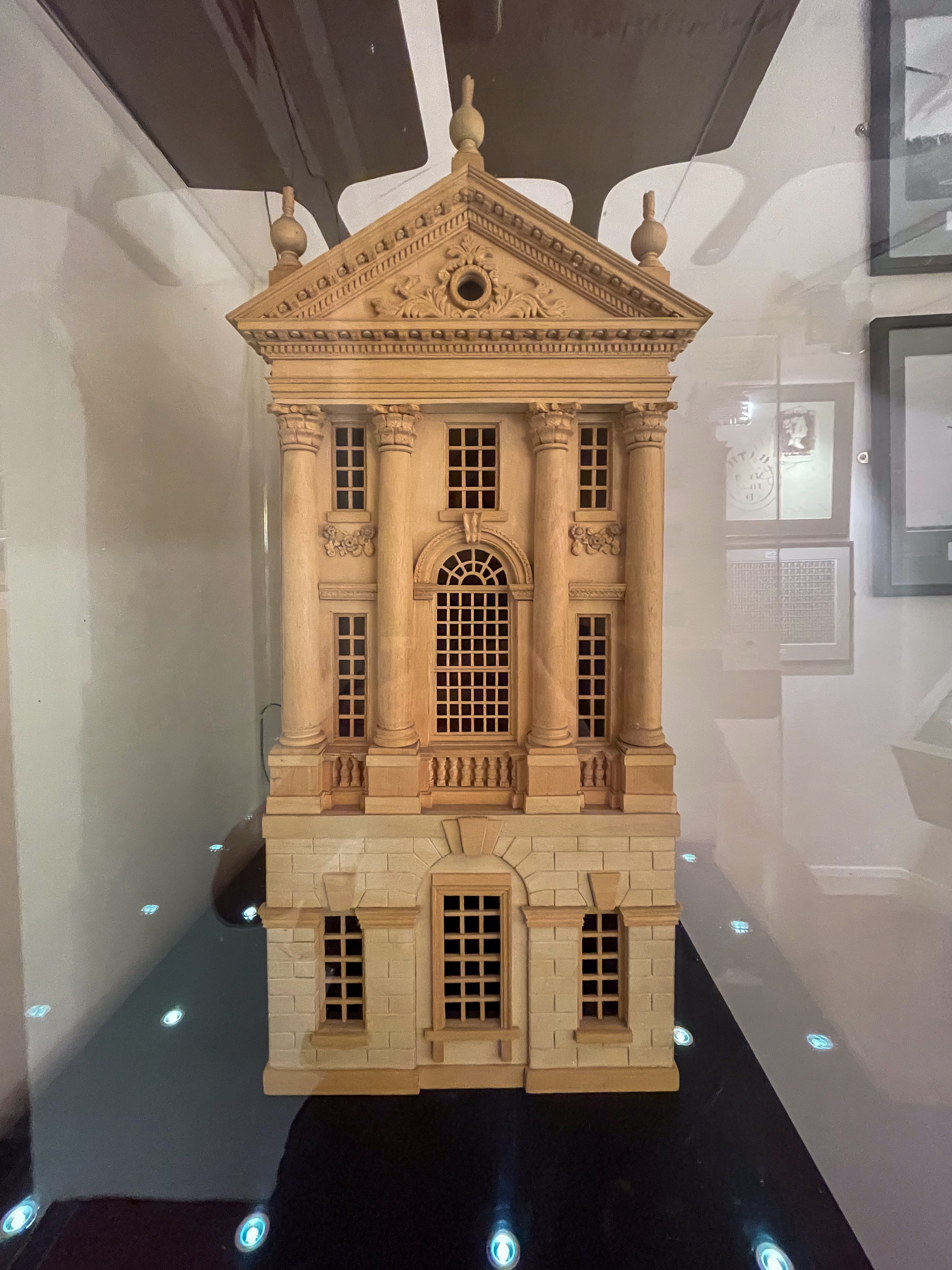
Model of the house at Bath Postal Museum

John Wood the Elder, in his 1742 writing in his Essay towards the future of Bath he says:

While Mr. Allen was making the Addition to the North Part of his House in Lilliput Alley he new fronted and raised the old Building a full Story higher; it consists of a Basement Story sustaining a double Story under the Crowning; and this is surmounted by an Attick, which created a sixth Rate House, and a Sample for the greatest Magnificence that was ever proposed by me for our City Houses.

Because of the modern use of "magnificent" it is often thought that in this passage Wood is referring to the Town House. But elsewhere in his Essay, Wood explains that his use of magnificence refers to size. He refers to decoration as "ornament" or "dress".

A closer examination of Wood's words and the number of floors in the Town House reveal that he was not referring to this building. A 6th rate house is the largest in Wood's list. The Town House does not comply with his description. Wood was talking about the House in Lilliput Alley where Allen was then living.

== North wing ==
A drawing by Henry Venn Lansdown in 1855 shows a "North Wing" – a mirror image of the original house in Lilliput alley. No such building exists today and commentators have claimed that it was demolished. viz: The north wing was removed in the 19th century to make way for the construction of York Street.

The survey of old Bath has found that Ralph Allen may have tried to buy, but never owned the land to the North of the Town House. Its history is well documented in the Papers of the Kingston Estate held at the British Library.

Venn Lansdown's drawing is the only evidence that a "North Wing" existed. Venn Lansdown is reputed to have idealised many of his scenes to please his patrons and it is worth noting the following:

Venn Lansdown's drawing is inaccurate in that he exaggerates the space between the house in North Parade Passage and the "Town House". It is about half that shown by him. It is possible to access the courtyard and view this in person. The key to the gate beside the friends meeting house is held by Crisp Cowley Estate agents.

To view the perspective of the scene as he has drawn it, Venn Lansdown would have necessarily seated himself on a scaffold some 20 feet high where the Friends Meeting House now stands. This was built in 1819 – thirty years before Venn Lansdown's Picture.
