= Prior Park Landscape Garden =

Grade I listed garden in Bath, England

Coordinates: 51.36721°N 2.34374°W

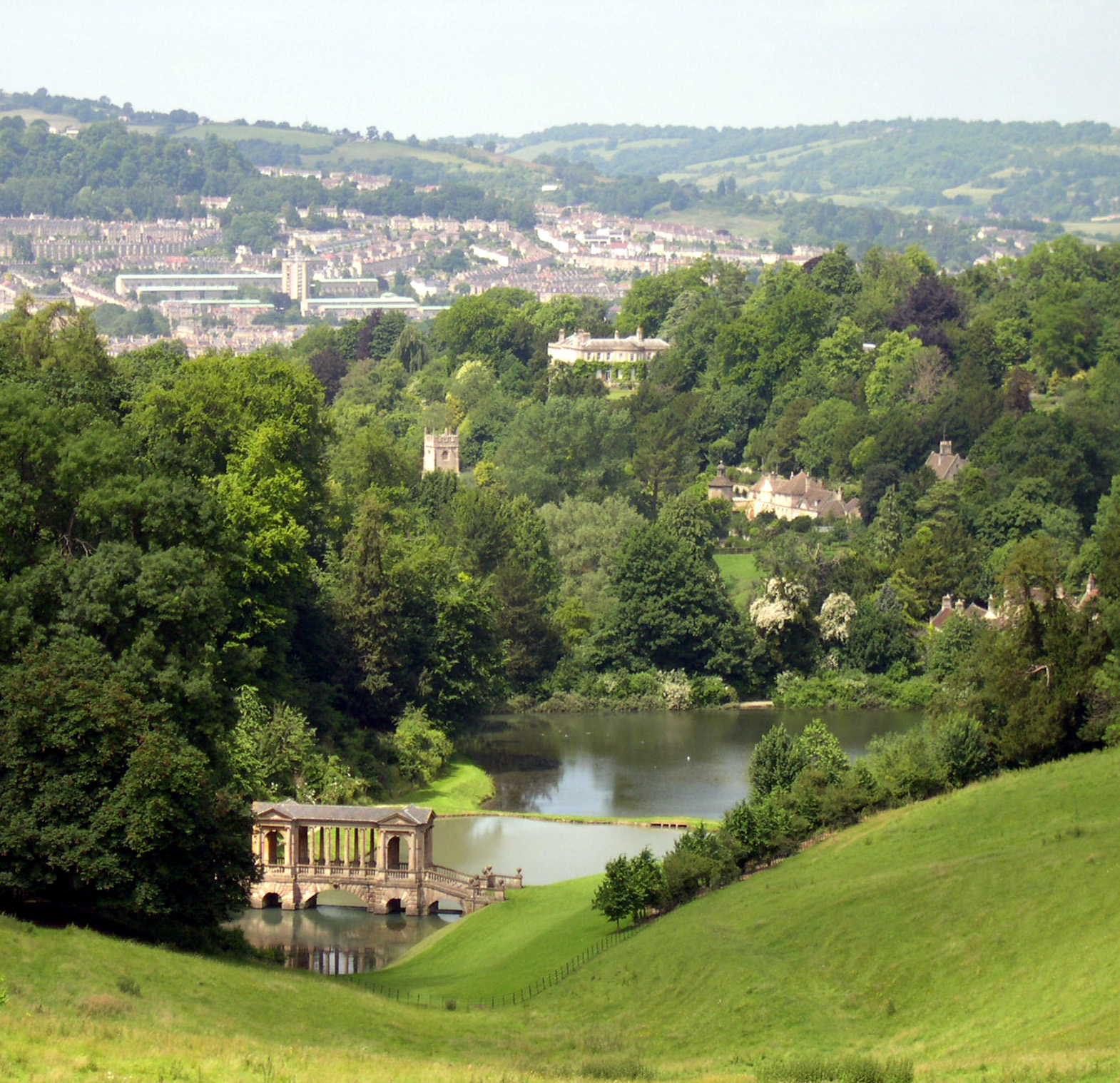
View from Prior Park over the Palladian bridge towards Bath

Prior Park Landscape Garden surrounding the Prior Park estate south of Bath, Somerset, England, was designed in the 18th century by the poet Alexander Pope and the landscape gardener Capability Brown, and is now owned by the National Trust. The garden was influential in defining the style known as the "English landscape garden" in continental Europe. The garden is Grade I listed in the Register of Historic Parks and Gardens of special historic interest in England.

Around 1100 the site was part of a deer park set out by the Bishop of Bath and Wells John of Tours. In 1720s it was bought by Ralph Allen and landscaped to complement his new house. Further development was undertaken after the house became a seminary and then a Roman Catholic grammar school (which later became Prior Park College). In the 1990s 11.3 hectares (28 acres) of the park and pleasure grounds were acquired by the National Trust and a large scale restoration undertaken. Features of Prior Park Landscape Garden include a Palladian architecture bridge, lake and ancillary buildings.

== History ==
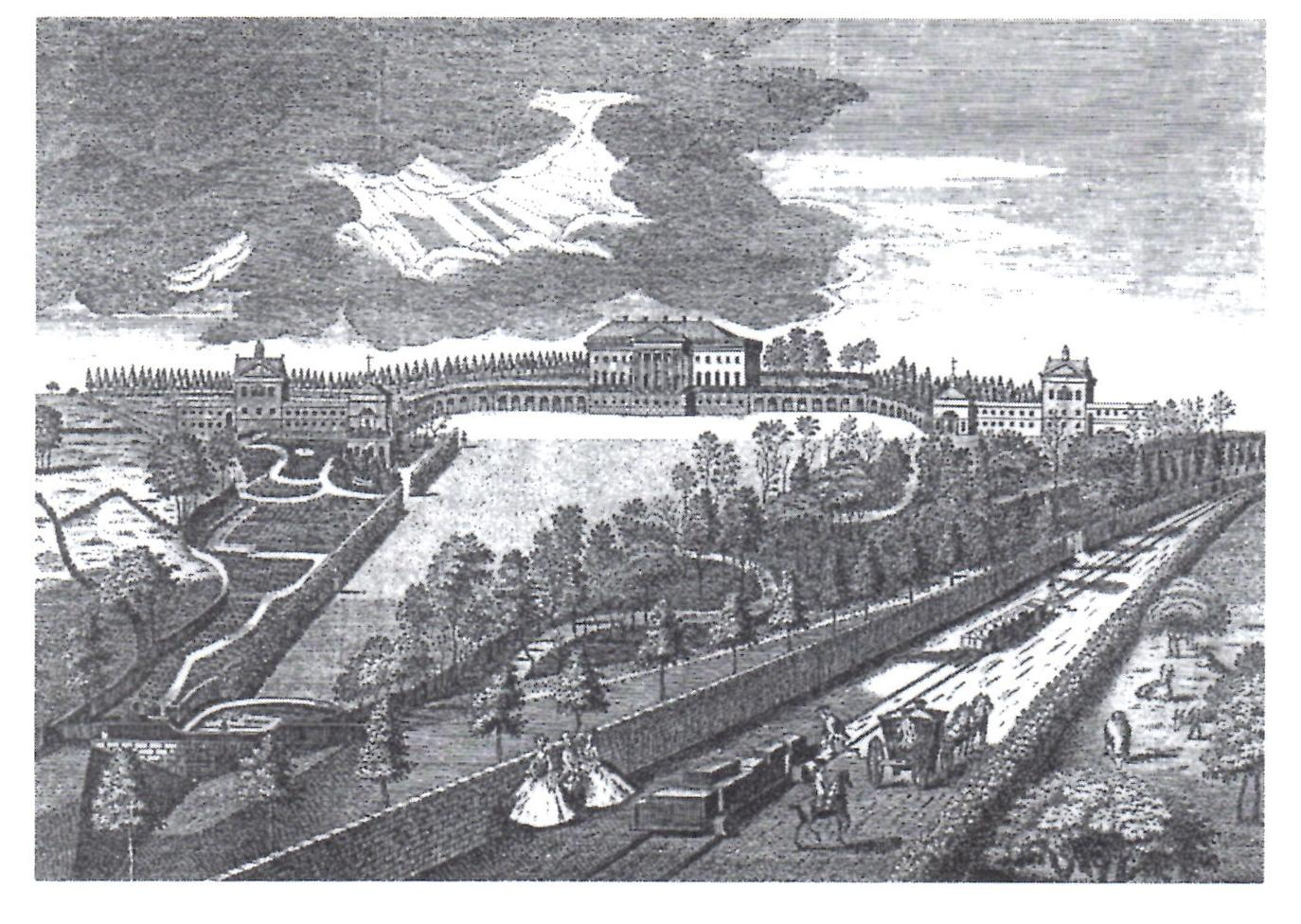
The gardens as they appeared in 1750

Set in a small steep valley overlooking the city of Bath a park was established on the site by John of Tours, the Bishop of Bath and Wells, in around 1100 as a deer park. It was subsequently sold to Humphrey Colles, a lawyer and member of parliament for Somerset, and then another member of parliament, Matthew Colthurst. Even before the Dissolution of the Monasteries the walls which had enclosed the deer park had fallen into disrepair and the deer had escaped. The land was then returned to agricultural use.

=== 18th-century design ===
Purchased by the local entrepreneur and philanthropist Ralph Allen in the 1720s, Prior Park's 11.3 hectares (28 acres) English landscape garden was laid out with advice from Alexander Pope during the construction of the house, overseen by Allen between the years 1734 and his death in 1764. During 1737, at least 55,200 trees, mostly elm and Scots pine, were planted, along the sides and top of the valley. The valley floor remained as grassland and drainage water was channelled to form fish ponds at the bottom of the valley.

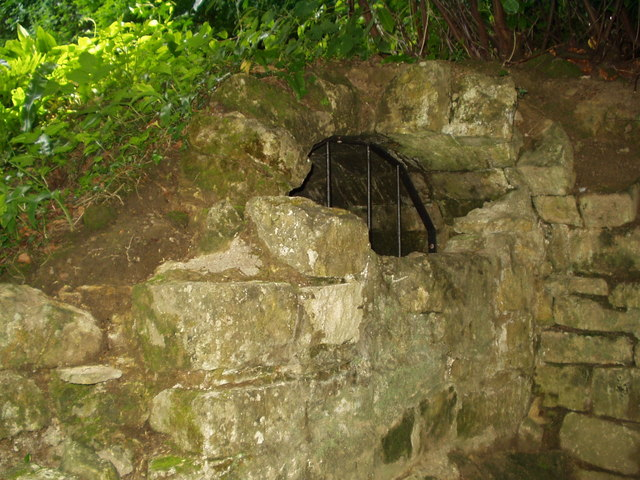
The ice house at Prior Park

Later work, during the 1750s and 1760s, was undertaken by the landscape gardener Capability Brown; this included extending the gardens to the north, removing the central cascade and making the wooded hillside (combe) into a single sweep. "The garden was influential in defining the style of garden known as the 'English garden' in continental Europe". The gardens were laid out in two distinct areas: those on the east side of the house were set out as vegetable plots on either side of the serpentine path, while on the western side were statues and grottoes, trees and evergreens with climbing and scented plants. Exotic plants which had only recently arrived in Britain included Aristolochiaceae, Passiflora and Bignonia.

In 1828 the house and estate were purchased by Bishop Augustine Baines to create a seminary and then Bishop William Clifford for a Roman Catholic grammar school which later became Prior Park College. Further landscaping was carried out in the 1880s.

=== Restoration ===
In 1993 the park and pleasure grounds were acquired by the National Trust and the site was opened to the public in 1996. In November 2002, a large-scale restoration project began on the cascade, serpentine lake and Gothic temple in the wilderness area, this is now complete. Extensive planting also took place in 2007. Future plans include re-roofing the grotto and building a replica Gothic temple.

== Garden features ==
The garden's features include a Palladian architecture bridge (one of only four of this design left in the world), Gothic temple, gravel cabinet, Mrs Allen's Grotto, the ice house, lodge and three pools with curtain walls as well as a serpentine lake. The curtain wall by the lake is known as the Sham Bridge and is similar to Kent's Cascade at Chiswick House and Venus's Vale at Rousham House. Ralph Allen was also responsible for the construction of Sham Castle on a hill overlooking Bath.

The rusticated stone piers on either side of the main entrance gates are surmounted by entablatures and large ornamental vases, while those at the drive entrance have ornamental carved finials. The Porter's Lodge was built along with the main house to designs by John Wood the Elder.

=== Palladian bridge ===
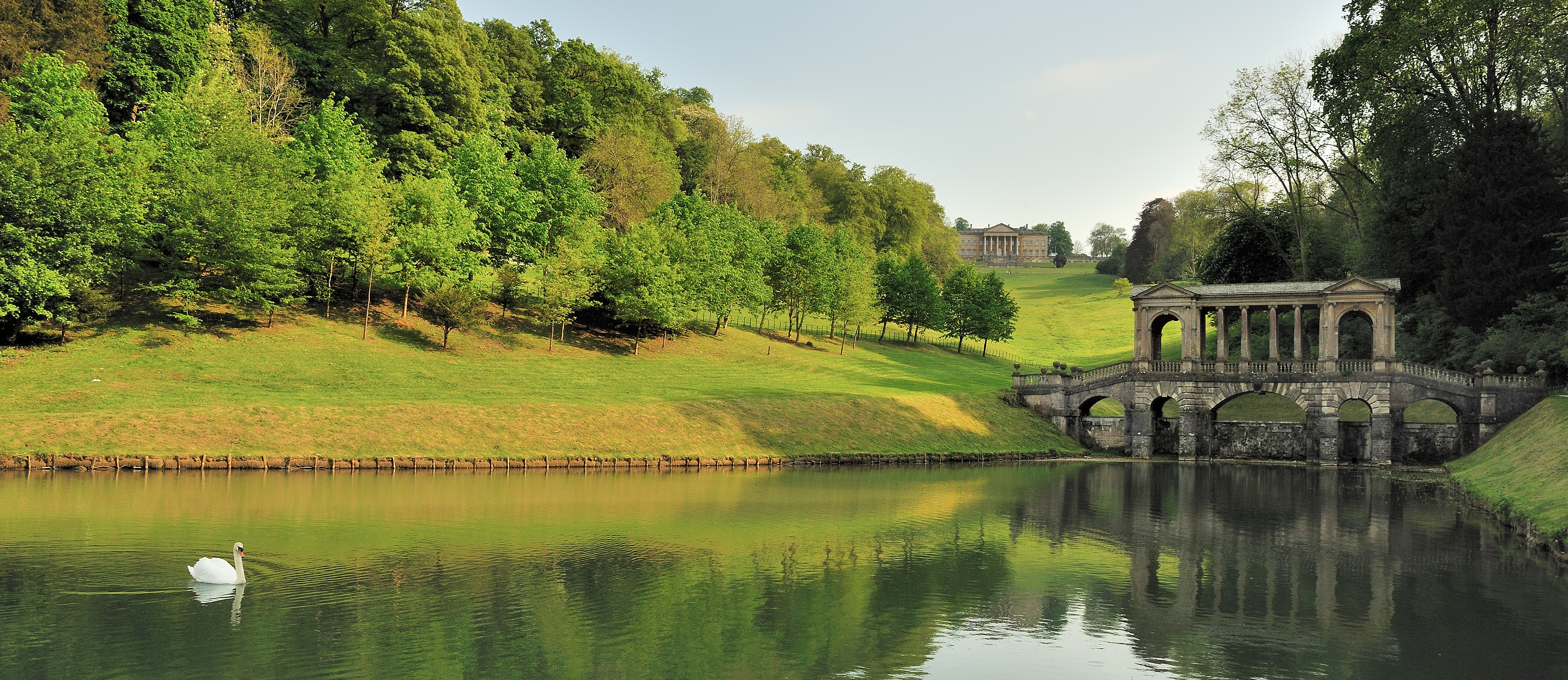
The Palladian bridge

The Palladian bridge, which is a copy of the one at Wilton House, has been designated as a Grade I listed building and scheduled monument. It was repaired in 1936.

The Palladian Bridge later featured on the cover of the 1996 album Morningrise by Swedish progressive metal band Opeth.

== Bath Skyline ==
A five-minute walk from the garden leads on to the Bath Skyline, a six-mile (10 km) circular walk around the city that encompasses woodlands, meadows, an Iron Age hill-fort, Roman settlements, 18th-century follies and views over the city.

== See also ==
- List of National Trust properties in Somerset
