= William Walker (English engraver) =

English engraver

- Born: November 1729; Thirsk, England
- Died: 18 February 1793 (aged 63); Clerkenwell, England
- Occupation: Engraver

William Walker (November 1729 – 18 February 1793) was an English engraver.

== Biography ==
Walker was the brother of Anthony Walker. William was born at Thirsk in November 1729, and apprenticed to a dyer. Subsequently he followed his brother to London, and was taught engraving by him. He excelled in his book-illustrations, which are very numerous, and was employed upon Paul Sandby's "Views in England and Wales," John Throsby's "Views in Leicestershire," and Harrison's "Classics." For John Boydell he executed a few large plates which were less successful. These include "Sir Balthasar Gerbier and his Family," after Anthony van Dyck, 1766; "Diana and Calisto," after François Lemoyne, 1767; "The Power of Beauty," after P. Lauri, 1767; and "Lions at Play," after Peter Paul Rubens, 1769. Walker devised the practice of rebiting, of which William Woollett made great use. He died in Rosoman Street, Clerkenwell. on 18 February 1793.

His son, John Walker, was also an engraver.
