= Thomas Moore Musgrave =

Thomas Moore Musgrave (28 December 1774, in London – 4 September 1854, in Bath) was an English postmaster and translator.

== Biography ==
Musgrave was born in London to Thomas and Elizabeth Musgrave (née Hide) on 28 December 1774. His mother died two years later, and his father's will made him his chief beneficiary upon his death when Musgrave was fourteen. He lived abroad for some time, and became fluent in German and Portuguese.

In 1802, he became Parliamentary Private Secretary to the Home Secretary, Lord Pelham. In 1804, he took the post of Secretary and Confidential Superintendent of the Aliens Office. Lord Minto gave him the position of Secretary to the Government of Ireland, in which he served one term, afterwards returning to the Aliens Office post, which Earl Spencer had kept open for him. He was released from this post in 1816 as part of a government shake-up, and was endowed with a pension.

Lord Pelham, who was now Postmaster General, appointed Musgrave to become the Mail Agent for Lisbon, in which post he was able to communicate valuable political information back to England during the Peninsular War. In 1821, Francis Freeling, Secretary of the Post Office, appointed him as Postmaster and Mail Agent for Falmouth, which was a leading hub of the Post Office Packet Service. This was handed over to the Admiralty in 1824, with Musgrave managing the transfer, whereupon his post as Postmaster was passed to William Gay, who served until 1843.

Musgrave was then Comptroller of the London Twopenny Post until 1833, when it was taken over by the General Post Office. He was then offered the post of Postmaster General of Jamaica, which he declined, fearing for his health in Jamaica's hot climate.

He was Postmaster of Bath from 1833 until his death in 1854. In this role, he was influential in the introduction of the Penny Black, the first postage stamp, and Mulready stationery. The first posting of a stamp in the world was from Bath post office on 2 May, four days prior to the official issue date. Only three blue (twopenny) Mulready envelopes marked 6 May 1840 are known to exist, one of which was from Musgrave and addressed to Isabella Tudor of Bath, and now resides in the Bath Postal Museum, which also has an exhibition about Musgrave.

Musgrave died on 4 September. He left behind one daughter, Ann, aged 32 at the time of his death, to whom he left everything in his will. Ann married her father's Chief Clerk, Jabez Rich, who later became Postmaster of Liverpool.

== Writings ==
As an author, Musgrave published several books and pamphlets, such as Considerations on the re-establishment of an effective Balance of Power (1813). As a translator, he is best known for his translation of the Portuguese epic poem Os Lusíadas (The Lusiads) into English blank verse, which was published in 1826 by John Murray.
