= Ralph Allen =

British postmaster and merchant (1693–1764)

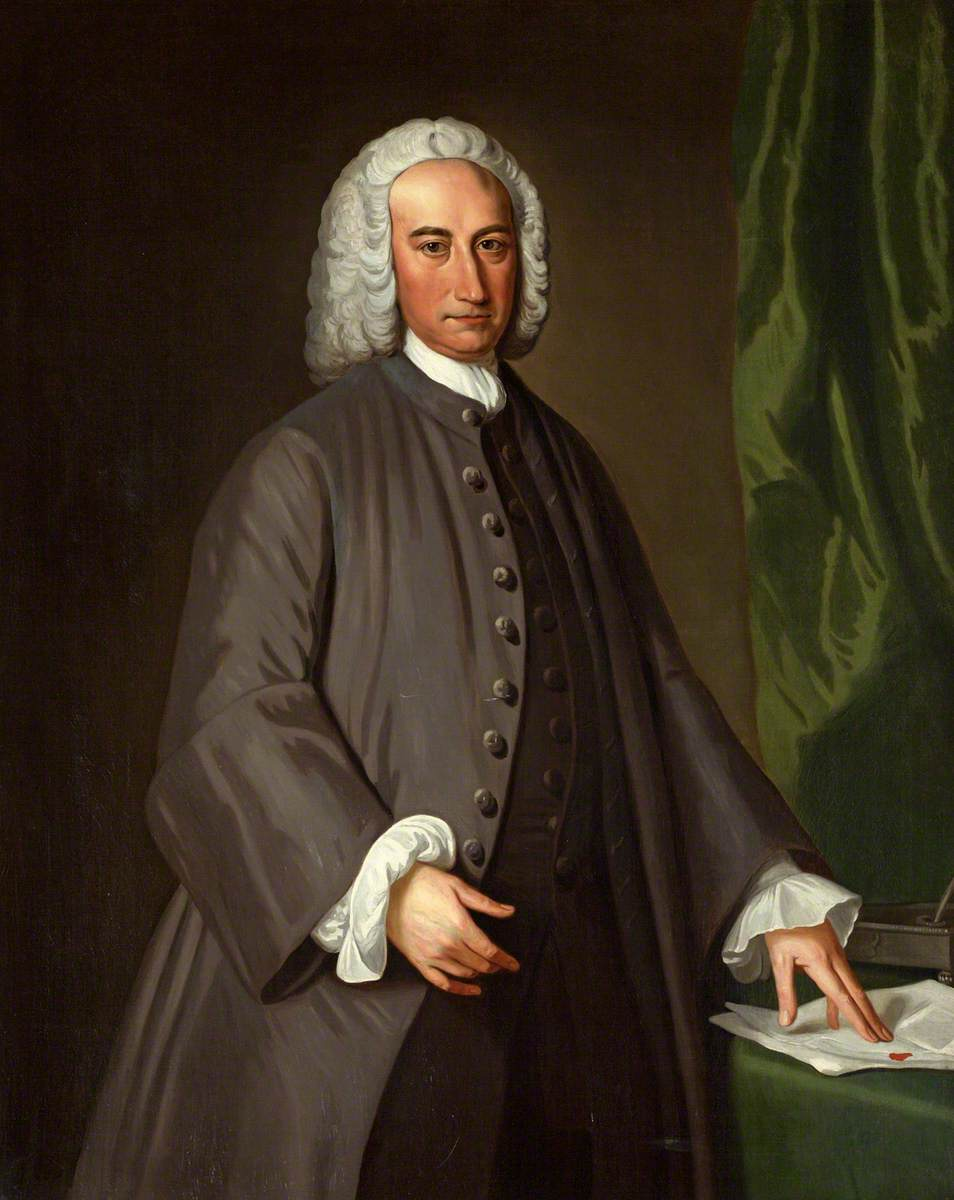
- Born: c. 1693; St Columb Major, Cornwall, England
- Died: 29 June 1764 (aged 70–71); Bath, Somerset, Great Britain
- Resting place: Claverton, Somerset
- Occupations: Postmaster, merchant and philanthropist
- Known for: Reforming the British postal system

Ralph Allen (c. 1693 – 29 June 1764) was a British postmaster, merchant and philanthropist best known for his reforms to Britain's postal system. Born in St Columb Major, Cornwall, he moved to Bath, Somerset to work in the municipal post office, becoming its postmaster by 1712. Allen made the system more efficient and took over contracts for the British mail service to cover areas of England up to the Anglo-Scottish border and into South Wales.

He purchased local stone mines from his postal profits and had Prior Park built as his country house to show off the versatility of Bath stone, using the old post office as his townhouse. Working alongside architect John Wood, the Elder, the stone Allen mined was heavily used in construction work for development works in Bath. However, the mines did not consistently make a profit and he subsidised them from his postal profits.

After his death, he was buried in a pyramid-topped tomb in Claverton, Somerset. Allen is commemorated in the names of streets and schools in the city of Bath and was the model for the character of Squire Allworthy in the 1749 novel The History of Tom Jones, a Foundling by Henry Fielding.

== Early life ==
Much is unknown or obscure regarding Allen's early life. The Oxford Dictionary of National Biography gives his father as Philip Allen, reputed to be an innkeeper. As a teenager, Allen worked at the Post Office at St Columb, run by his grandmother. He moved in 1710 to Bath, where he became a post office clerk, and at the age of 19, in 1712, became the Postmaster of Bath. In 1742 he was elected Mayor of Bath.

== Involvement in the postal system ==
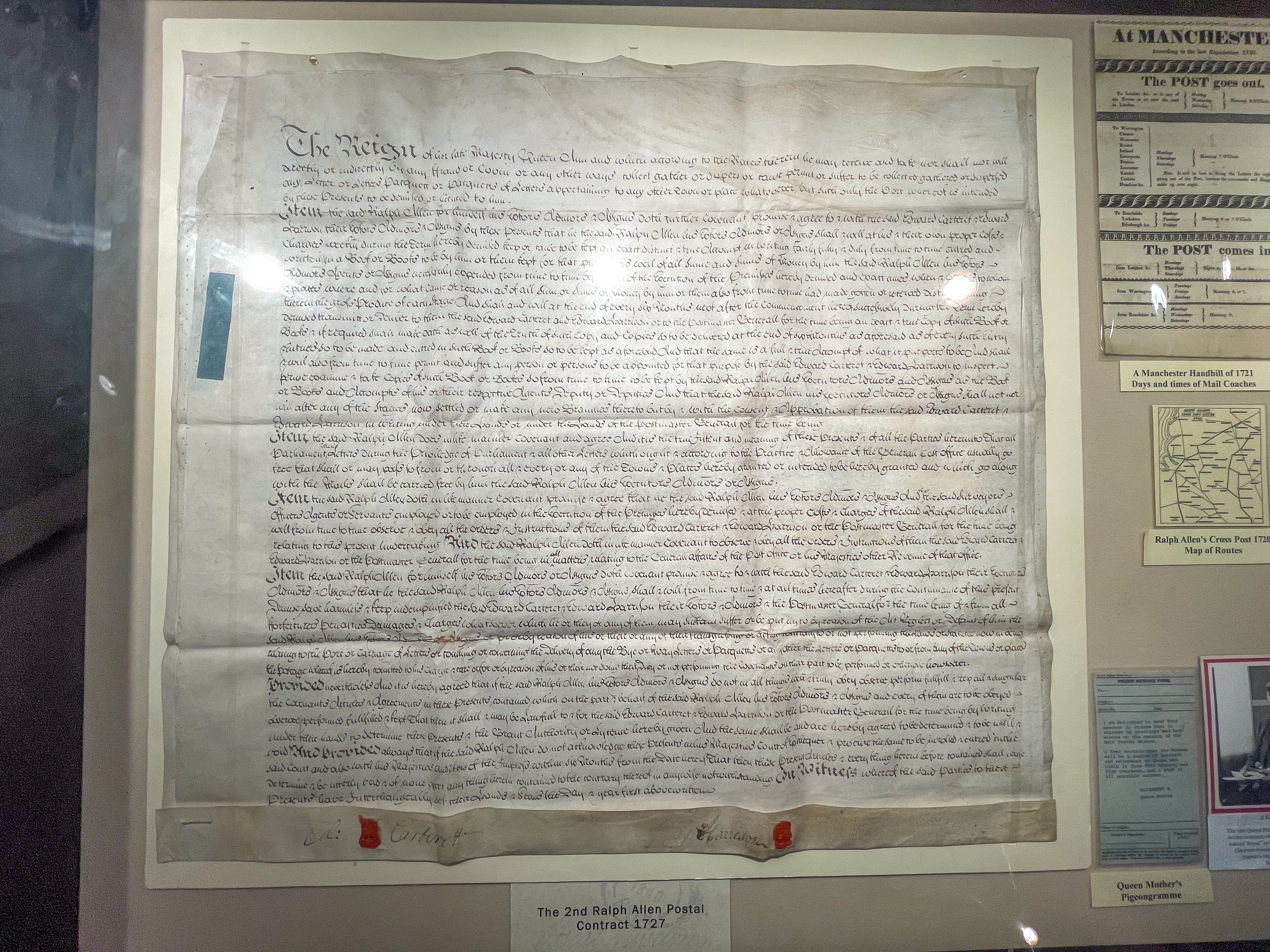
Allen's second postal contract, 1727, at the Bath Postal Museum

At the age of 27, Allen took control of the Cross and Bye Posts in the South West under a seven-year contract with the General Post Office, although he had no official title. At the end of this period he had not made a profit, only breaking even, but he had the courage to continue.

Over the next few years, he reformed the postal service. He realised that post boys were delivering items of mail along their route without them being declared and that this was lost profit. He introduced a "signed for" system that prevented the malpractice. He also improved efficiency by not requiring mail to go via London.

Allen's reputation grew and he took over more and more of the English postal system, signing contracts every seven years until he died aged 71. It is estimated that he saved the Post Office £1,500,000 over a 40-year period. He won the patronage of General Wade in 1715, when he disclosed details of a Jacobite uprising in Cornwall.

== Bath stone and his residences ==
With the arrival of John Wood in Bath, Allen used the wealth gained from his postal reforms to acquire the stone quarries at Combe Down and Bathampton Down Mines. Hitherto, the quarry masons had always hewn stone roughly providing blocks of varying size. The resulting uneven surface is known as "rubble" and buildings of this type – built during the Stuart period – are visible throughout the older parts of Bath.

The distinctive honey-coloured Bath stone, used to build the Georgian city, made Allen a second fortune. The building in Lilliput Alley, Bath (now North Parade Passage), which he used as a post office, became his town house and in 1727 he refronted the southern rubble wall, extended the house to the north and added a new storey. John Wood the Elder refers to this in his "Essay towards the future of Bath". Allen was astute at marketing the qualities of Bath stone and erected an elaborately ornate building a few feet to the north of his house to demonstrate its qualities. The extension (as Wood refers to it) has become known as "Ralph Allen's Town House", though whether it was designed by Wood is unproven and many local historians consider it unlikely. Allen continued to live there until 1745, when he moved to Prior Park, and the town house became his offices.

Allen had the Palladian mansion of Prior Park built (1742) on a hill overlooking the city, "To see all Bath, and for all Bath to see". He gave money and the stone for the building of the Mineral Water Hospital in central Bath 1738. In 1758 he bought Claverton Manor, just east of Bath.

Allen had a summer home built in the coastal town of Weymouth in Dorset, overlooking the harbour at number 2 Trinity Road, opposite the Customs House. There is a plaque on the house to commemorate Allen. His Bath stone was used in the Georgian buildings of Weymouth.

== Commemoration ==
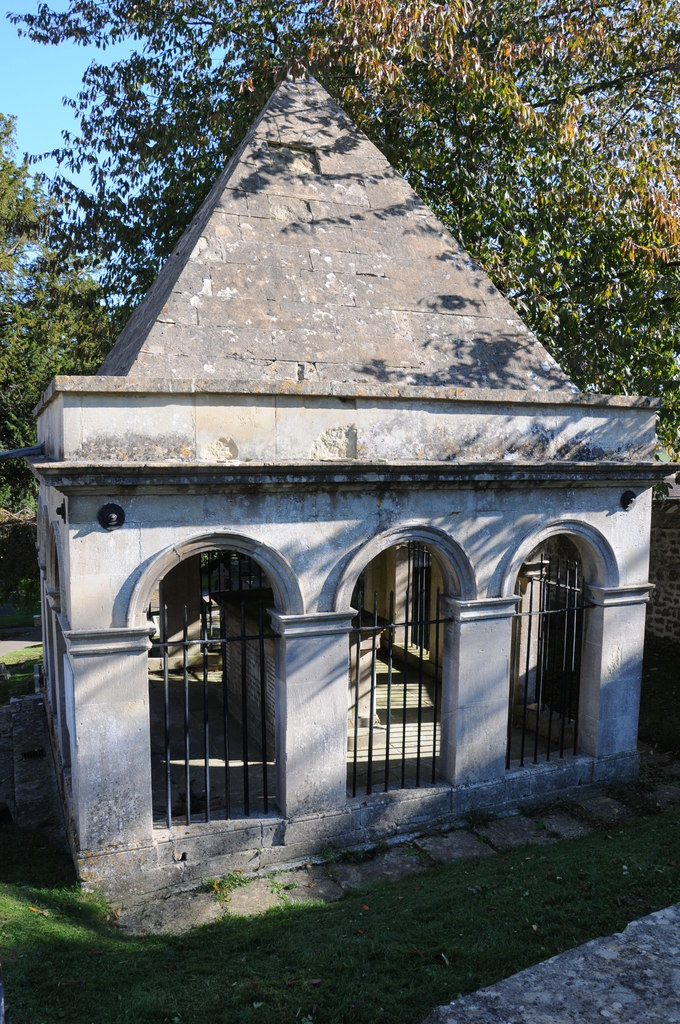
Allen's tomb in Claverton churchyard

After Allen died in Bath on 29 June 1764, he was buried in a pyramid-topped tomb in Claverton churchyard, on the outskirts of the city. A marble bust stood in the Mineral Water Hospital (later the Royal National Hospital for Rheumatic Diseases) and was moved to the hospital's new building at Combe Park in 2019.

His name is commemorated in Ralph Allen Drive which runs past his former home at Prior Park. Now a busy road from Combe Down village to Bath city centre, this was the route by which the stone from his quarries at Combe Down was sent on wooden sledges down to the River Avon. Prior Park College, a private school for 11- to 18-year-olds, is housed in Allen's former home and incorporates a boys' boarding house named Allen House. The Prior Park Landscape Garden and Palladian bridge are cared for by the National Trust, who brought the garden back from dereliction in 1993. He is also remembered in Ralph Allen School, one of the city's state secondary schools.

The Ralph Allen CornerStone in Combe Down village opened in the autumn of 2013. This houses the archives of the Combe Down Heritage Society and provides a community hub and information centre as part of the legacy of the project to infill the stone mines underneath the village. Writer Henry Fielding used Allen as the model for Squire Allworthy in the 1749 novel The History of Tom Jones, a Foundling; he is also mentioned obliquely in Joseph Andrews, by the same author, as an example (alongside John Kyrle) of a charitable gentleman.

== See also ==
- Bath Postal Museum

== Bibliography ==
- Boyce, B. (1967). The benevolent man: a life of Ralph Allen of Bath.
- Davis, S. (1985). Ralph Allen: benefactor and postal reformer (Booklet). Bath Postal Museum.
- Erskine-Hill, Howard (1975). "'Low-Born Allen': Ralph Allen (1693–1764)". The Social Milieu of Alexander Pope.
- Hopkins, A. E. (ed.) (1960). Ralph Allen's own narrative, 1720–1761.
- Peach, R.E.M. (1895). The life and times of Ralph Allen. D. Nutt.
- Walker, George (1938). Haste, Post, Haste! Postmen and Post-roads Through the Ages. London: George G. Harrap.
