= Bath Postal Museum =

Museum in Bath, England

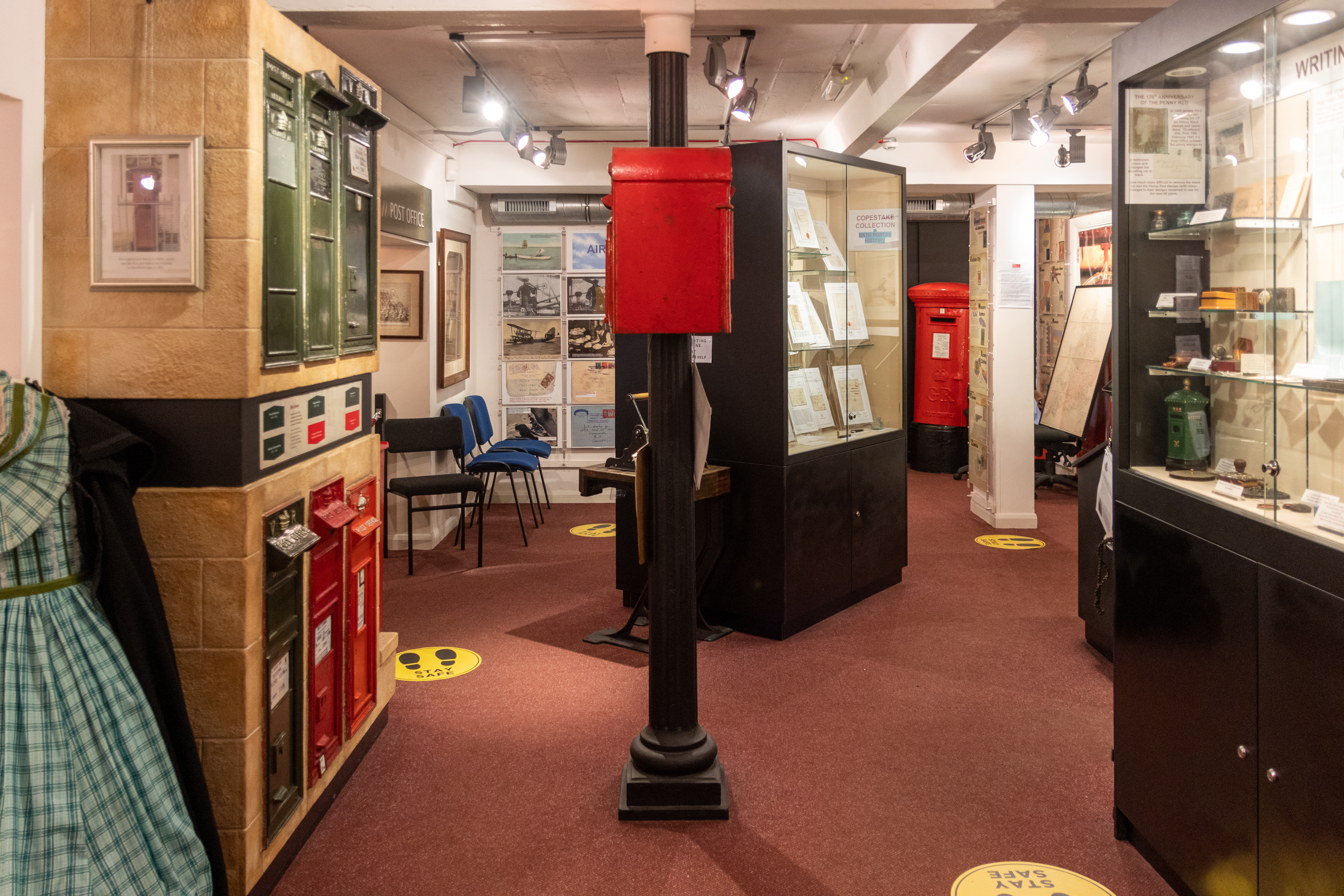

- Location within Somerset and the United Kingdom
- Established: 1979
- Location: Bath, Somerset
- Coordinates: 51.3794°N 2.3670°W
- Website: Official website

The Bath Postal Museum was a postal museum in Bath, Somerset, England.

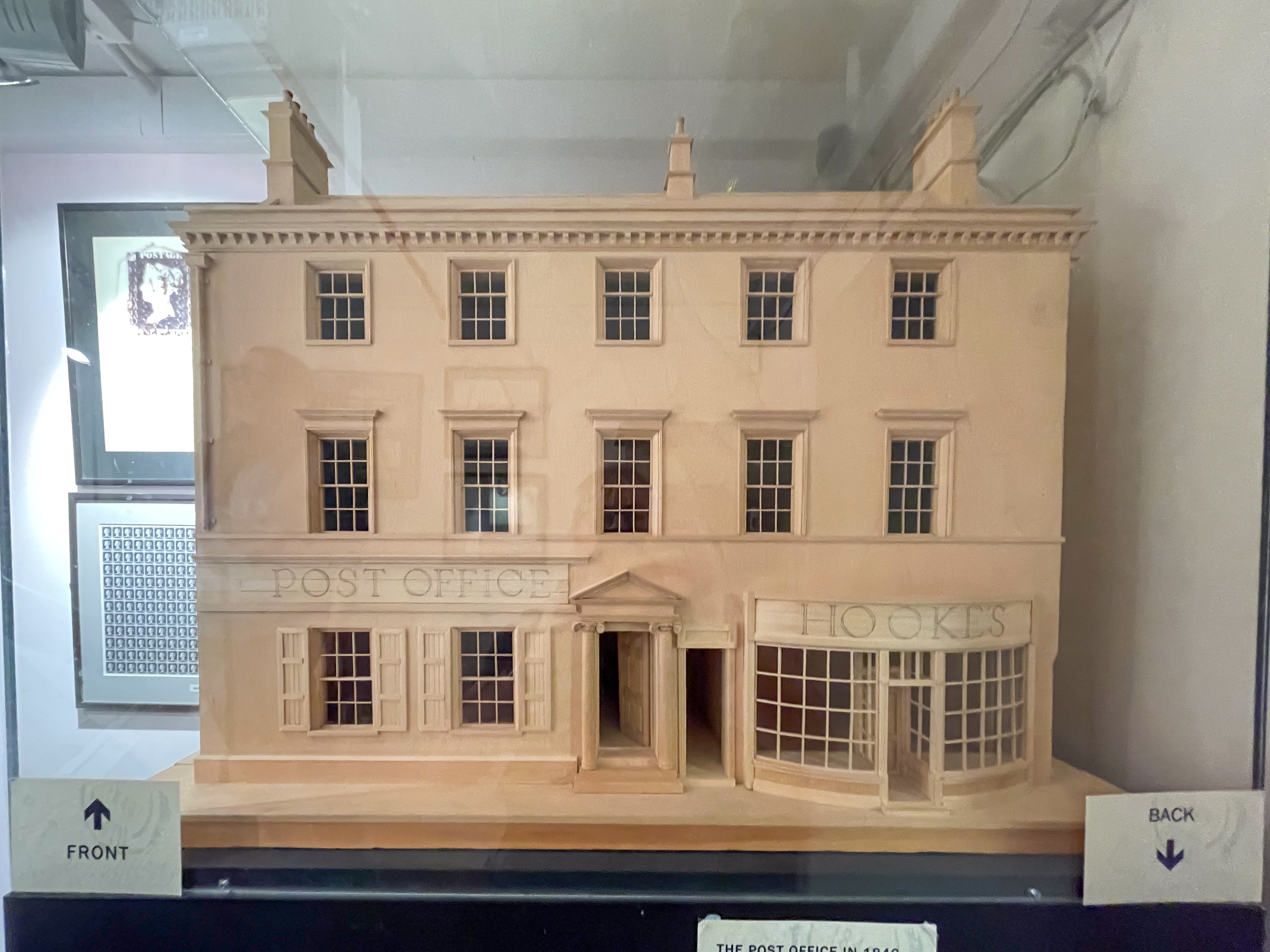
Model of the post office building that the museum used to be located in

The museum was founded in 1979 by Audrey and Harold Swindells in the basement of their house in Great Pulteney Street. In 1985, it moved to a home in Broad Street. This was the site of Bath's main Post Office from 1822 to 1854 and the building in which the first recorded posting of a Penny Black took place on 2 May 1840. It was designated by English Heritage as a grade II listed building.

The museum's collections included: biographies of key figures involved with the development of the Post Office and connected with Bath, such as Ralph Allen, John Palmer and Thomas Moore Musgrave; a history of the post from 2000BC to the current day and a history of the British postbox.

Artefacts on display included quills and ink wells, stamp boxes, post boxes, post horns, clay tablets, strip maps, model mail coaches, and letters and postcards. There was also a replica Victorian post office.

Due to vastly increased rent from 2003, the museum had to move out of the Broad Street building and on 7 November 2006 it reopened on a much smaller scale in the basement of the post office building at 27 Northgate Street.

In September 2023, shortly after the death of its founder Audrey Swindells and 44 years of operation, the museum closed when its lease expired.
