= Judith (oratorio) =

Oratorio composed by Thomas Arne

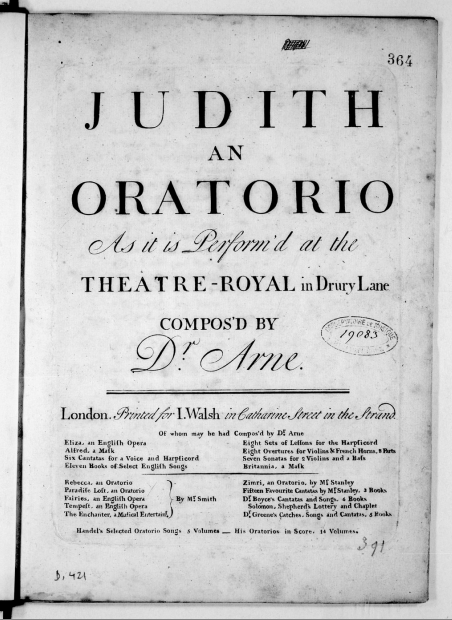
Title Page of the score, Judith an Oratorio.

Judith is an oratorio composed by Thomas Arne with words by the librettist, Isaac Bickerstaffe. It was first performed on 27 February 1761 at Drury Lane Theatre. It depicts the story of Judith, taken from the Book of Judith of the Old Testament. It was first published in 1761 and republished with edits in 1764. The piece is divided into three acts, with a total of 28 movements including nine choruses, two duets, an overture, and 16 arias.

== Background and context ==
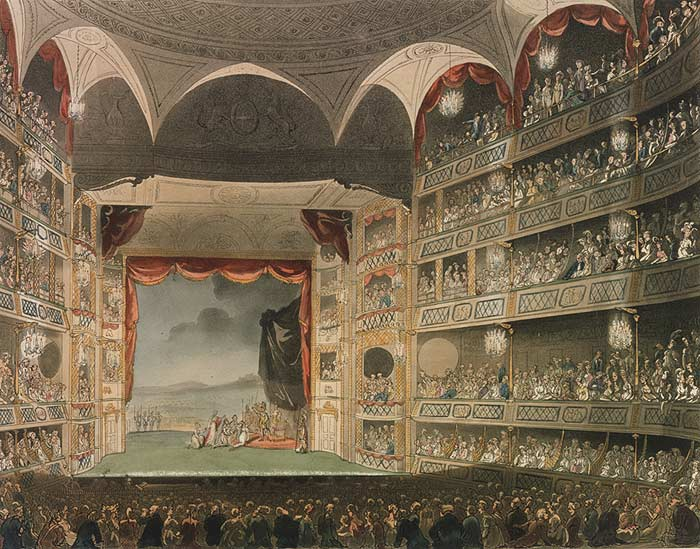
Drury Lane Theatre. 19th-century artwork of the Henry Holland rebuilding of the Drury Lane Theatre, Covent Garden, London, UK. This building, the third and largest theatre on this site, burned down in February 1809.

This piece was composed for Drury Lane during Lent in 1761. Most musicologists during Arne's time dismissed Judith as insubstantial compared to the oratorios of Handel. The airs and choruses both were criticized and praised equally: the choruses were a disappointment in comparison to the great force of those in Handel's works, but were still thought of as deserving praise among the hierarchy of choral composing. The airs were thought of as pleasing and noteworthy by some, but thought to be overly hymn-like by other musical critics at the time.

Arne's sister Susannah Maria Arne was a noted contralto whom Arne often employed in his musical works. When she left Drury Lane for Covent Garden in 1750, Arne followed her. In 1755, Thomas Arne separated from his wife, previously singer Cecilia Young, as he claimed that she was "mentally ill." After the separation, Arne began an affair with one of his pupils, a soprano named Charlotte Brent. It was during this affair that Thomas Arne and Isaac Bickerstaffe collaborated on their first work of importance: Arne's 1760 Opera, Thomas and Sally, with Charlotte Brent cast as the leading role of Sally. A year later, Judith was put on.

It is speculated that the collaboration of Bickerstaff and Arne was casual in nature. Simply put, Arne was never well matched with writing libretti, and Bickerstaff was. Bickerstaff approached Arne with a letter of introduction from Leucothoe, a mutual friend in Dublin, and convinced Arne to collaborate. It is also speculated that when writing Thomas and Sally, Bickerstaff submitted the written play to Covent Garden Theatre without consulting Arne.

== Plot ==
The libretto is based on Judith 7-15: Judith, a beautiful widow is upset with her Israelite countrymen for not trusting in God to deliver their home, Bethulia, from their Assyrian conquerors. She goes with her loyal maid, Abra, to the Assyrian camp and promises the enemy general, Holofernes, information on the Israelites. When she gains his trust, she is invited to a banquet in Holofernes' tent where drinks himself into a stupor. When Judith gets him alone, she decapitates him. She takes his head back to Bethulia and her fearful countrymen. When the invading Assyrian army realizes they have lost their leader, they retreat.

=== Characters ===
Name	Role
Judith	A beautiful Israelite widow from Bethulia
Abra	Judith's faithful handmaiden
Ozias	Chief of Bethulia (Israelites)
Charmis	An Elder of Bethulia
Holofernes	Assyrian (enemy) general

=== Act I ===
Scene one takes place in a public part of the city of Bethulia with the opening chorus, Father of mercies lend thine ear. The citizens are parched and suffering because the invading Assyrian army has cut off the water sources to the city. The scene closes with the air, O torment great, too great to bear.

Scene two opens with a man pleading to let the Assyrians take hold of the city to end the city's suffering. Ozias responds with his air, Be humble, suff'ring, trust in God, telling the people to be patient and wait for five more days before letting the Assyrians seize the city.

Scene three takes place in Judith's house. Abra is lamenting over the fate of the city, convinced that God will not save Bethulia within the allotted five days. Judith, being a woman of great faith, seeks God through meditation. Abra sings the air, Wake my harp! to melting measures, and Judith returns speaking of this enormous feat God has seemingly entrusted upon her, singing Advent'rous, lo! I spread the sail.

Scene four takes place in a public area of the city again, where Judith scolds the people and the rulers of Bethulia for doubting God, to which the choir of Israelites responds with When Israel wept, no comfort nigh, Thou herdst, O Lord, Thy people's cry. Judith then tells the people and rulers of Bethulia that she means to free Bethulia of the Assyrian grasp, but asks them not to question how she means to do it. She then sings the air, Remember what Jehova swore.

Scene five begins with Charmis speaking of how Judith will surely save the city of Bethulia. In his air, Conquest is not, to bestow, he claims that she will succeed not because of strength, but because she trusts in the Lord. The chorus of Israelites closes act one with Hear, angels hear! celestial choirs.

=== Act II ===
Scene one takes place in the Assyrian camp near Bethulia, where Judith and Abra seek out Holofernes. Judith tells Holofernes that she had fled Bethulia with Abra because the citizens, "by crimes most odius," had invoked the wrath of the heavens upon themselves. She promises to show him and the Assyrian troops a secret entry into Bethulia. Judith sings, Oh! strive not, with ill-suited praise, and Holofernes, woo'd by Judith's beauty and grateful of the information given, grants Judith and Abra safe passage among the camp. He invites Judith to stay in her own tent amongst the troops, singing, Adorn'd with every matchless grace. The chorus of Assyrian soldiers sing Rejoice! rejoice! Judea falls.

Scene two takes place in Judith's tent, where Judith warns Abra not to let the Assyrian's flattery cloud her judgement. To this, Abra responds with her air, Vain is beauty's gaudy flow'r. They hush as two Assyrians enter their tent to invite them to a banquent held by Holofernes. An Assyrian woman sings, Haste to the gardens of delight.

Scene three consists of Judith and Abra praying to God for strength to finally free Bethulia from Holofernes' grasp in the duet, O thou on whom the weak depend.

Scene four changes to the tent of Holofernes which is filled with Assyrian soldiers. Holofernes sings the drinking song, Hail, immortal Bacchus! known, as the chorus of Assyrian soldiers echo.

Scene five takes place again in the tent of Holofernes as Judith and Abra enter. Holofernes, filled with lust for Judith, requests to lay his head upon her breast. She allows him, and lulls him into a drunken sleep with her air, Sleep, gentle cherub, sleep descend! The chorus of Assyrians end the act singing, Prepare the genial bow'r, prepare!

=== Act III ===
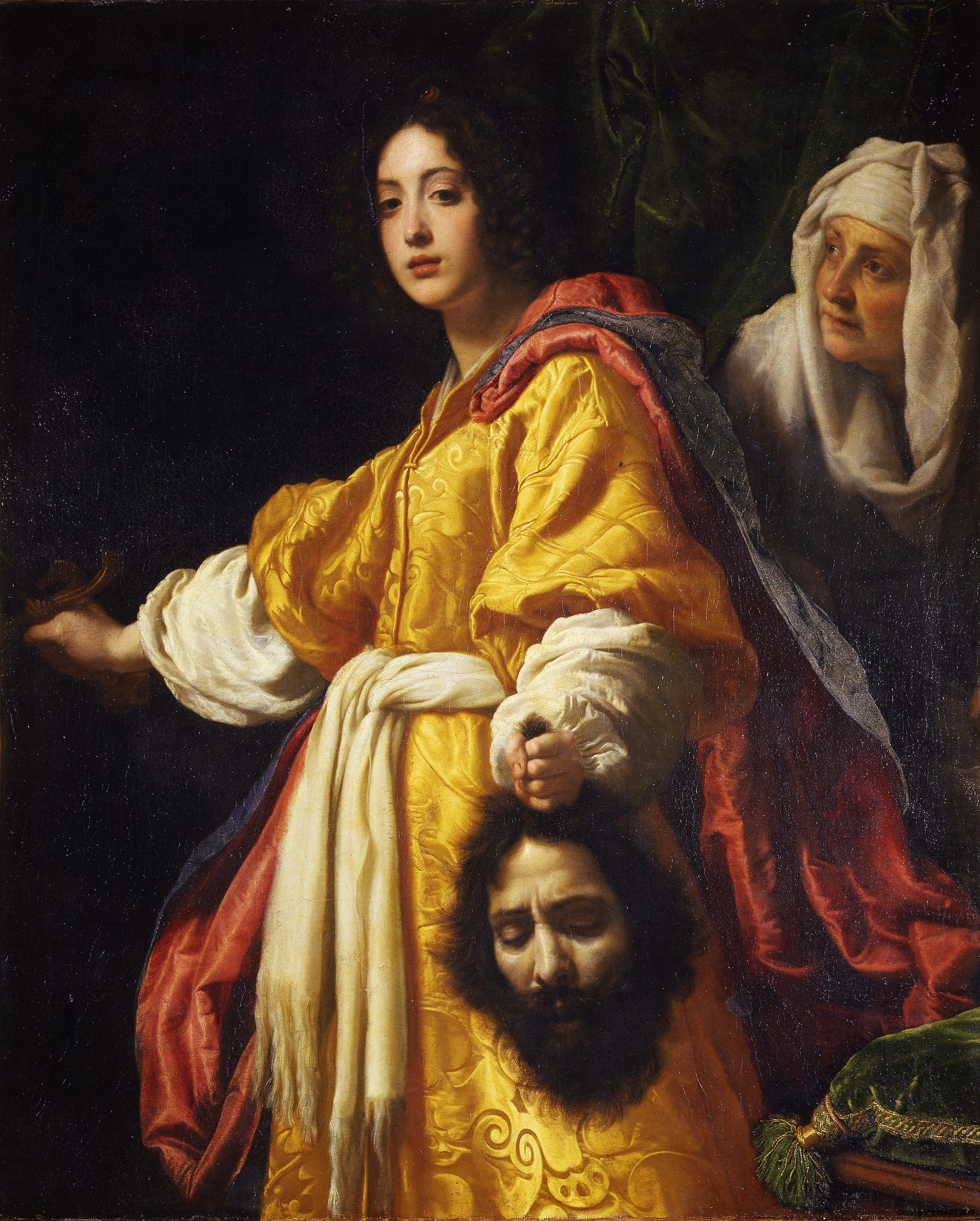
Oil on canvas painting by Cristofano Allori depicting Judith after beheading Holofernes to liberate her countrymen.

Scene one begins back in Bethulia with Judith telling Ozias and Charmis how she beheaded Holofernes while he lay in a drunken slumber and returned to Bethulia unquestioned and unharmed. Ozias, overjoyed, praises Judith for her deeds, singing Mongst heroes and sages recorded.

Scene two takes place in a public part of Bethulia. Judith shows Holofernes' severed head to the citizens, and tells them to take up arms and charge into battle against the Assyrians. After seeing the city revolt, she explains, the Assyrians will call upon their general, Holofernes. She explains further, after they find their general dead in his bed chamber, the Assyrians will be overcome with fear and flee their camp. Judith sings O Lord, our God! tremendous rise, followed by a chorus of Israelites singing, Who can Jehova's wrath abide.

In scene three, the citizens of Bethulia rejoice, preparing a feast and parading garlands through the streets. A man sings, No more the Heathens shall blaspheme.

Scene four consists of a chorus of Israelites singing, Breathe the Pipe, the Timbrel sound, a man singing, The Victor on his lofty seat, and the chorus repeating again.

Scene five Judith shames the people of Israel for acting like heathens by giving the glory of God's works to man. She sings, Not unto us, but to his Name.

Scene six Ozias claims Israel should rejoice, for the Assyrians have thrown down their weapons and abandoned their camps. Abra and Ozias sing the duet, On thy borders, O Jordan.

Final scene Judith gives the speech, Here, O ye sons of Jacob, let us rest! and the chorus of Israelites sings, Hear, Angels hear! Celestial Choirs.

Revised final scene (1764 edition) Judith's speech is set to music, replacing the final chorus. (Arne and Bickerstaff were not pleased with Hear, Angels hear! Celestial Choirs, so they dropped it completely)

== Music by sections ==
=== Voice parts and instrumentation ===
Role	Voice Part
Judith an Israelite widow	Soprano
Abra Judith's handmaiden	Soprano
Ozias chief of Bethulia (Israelites)	Tenor
Charmis an Elder	Baritone
Holofernes Assyrian (enemy) general	Tenor
Two Israelites	Tenor and Soprano
Assyrian woman	Soprano
Israelites and Assyrians	Chorus, SATB

In some performances, the parts of Ozias and Holofernes were sung an octave higher by the castrato, Giusto Fernando Tenducci.

The Instrumentation in Judith consists of two flutes, two french horns, two oboes, two bassoons, two violins, a viola, timpani, a harp, and basso continuo consisting of alternating harpsichord and organ. The harp is only called for in one movement, Wake my Harp! to melting measures sung by Abra in act 1.

=== Act I music ===
Number	Role	Key
1. Overture		G Major
2. "Father of mercies, lend thine ear"	Chorus of Israelites	A Minor
3. "O torment great, too great to bear"	An Israelite Woman	G Minor
4. "Be humble, suff'ring, trust in God"	Ozias	D Major
5. "Wake my harp! to melting measures"	Abra	G Major
6. "Advent'rous lo! I spread the sail"	Judith	Eb Major
7. "When Israel wept, no comfort nigh"	Chorus of Israelites	G Major
8. "Remember what Jehova swore"	Judith	Bb Major
9. "Conquest is not to bestow"	Charmis	C Major
10. "Hear, angels hear! Celestial choirs"	Chorus of Israelites	D Major

Numbers 3, 4, and 5 take the structure of the rejuvenated da capo aria of the Classical era. The ABA' structure of these airs and the transition from the only pieces in minor keys in the oratorio signify the change in thoughts and the succession of moods from the parched cry of an Israelite woman to the pious air of Ozias.

Number 5, Abra's air, "Wake my harp! to melting measures," follows immediately after Judith's accompanied recitative, in which Judith reveals that her emotions have been stirred by God and instructs Abra to play a "solemn strain" while she goes off to pray. This "solemn strain" is accompanied with harp, harpsichord, and pizzicato strings. The harp only appears in this one air in the oratorio. The texture of the accompaniment is simple, but is underneath a beautiful lyrical melody, typical of the galant style of the classical era.

Many of the airs in Judith are characterized by the balanced phrases of the early Classical style with fluid basso continuo, accompaniment of the orchestra, baroque dances, and quick harmonic rhythm. Number 9, sung by Charmis, is a prime example of this. In this air, Charmis claims that Judith will save the Israelites not because she is strong or valiant, but because she trusts in Jehova. The musical setting acts as a reflection of this optimism, with an orchestral doubling of the dance like vocal line and the oboe playing a countermelody of parallel thirds and sixths.

=== Act II music ===
Number	Role	Key
11. "Oh strive not with ill-suited praise"	Judith	Bb Major
12. "Adorn'd with ev'ry matchless grace"	Holofernes	Eb Major
13. "Rejoice! rejoice! Judea falls"	Chorus of Assyrians	Eb Major
14. "Vain is beauty, gaudy flow'r"	Abra	A Major
15. "Haste to the gardens of delight"	An Assyrian Woman	D Major
15a. "How cheerful along the gay mead (plain)"	Judith	F Major
16. "Oh thou, on whom the weak depend"	Judith, Abra	G Major
17. "Hail, immortal Bacchus!"	Holofernes, Chorus of Assyrians	D Major
18. "Sleep, gentle cherub! -- Sleep descend!"	Judith	F Major
19. "Prepare the genial bow'r"	Chorus of Assyrians	G Major

In Act II Number 16, "Oh thou, on whom the weak depend," Judith in Abra pray for strength after Holofernes has invited them to dinner. In the beginning of the duet, the two vocal lines are written in close imitation, Abra's line being only an eighth note after Judith's, but come together in homophonic counterpoint at the end of the phrase, creating the symmetry of phrase typical of the classical era. On the word "attend," the two voices sing rather melismatic sections completely in parallel thirds, Abra's part being the lower of the two.

Similar to the dance-like quality of Number 9 in Act I, is the drinking song of Holofernes and the Assyrian soldiers in Act II, as they engage in an upbeat 6/8 meter in D Major.

In Act II Number 18, Judith sings Holofernes to sleep with symmetrical vocal phrases. The voice and harmony paint the text through moving in appropriate descending motion through the text "descend" and spreads over a first inversion G major triad, with Bb raised to B natural on the word "spread," as the piece modulates to the dominant. This piece is one of the few in the oratorio with contrapuntally conceived string writing, as the violins and viola continue chains of suspension over a basso continuo that moves by eighth-notes. This contrast between the strings and basso continuo is thought to symbolize sleep descending over Holofernes' mind.

=== Act III music ===
Number	Role	Key
20. "With heroes and sages recorded"	Ozias	F Major
21. "O Lord, our God! tremendous rise"	Judith	Bb Major
22. "Who can Jehova's wrath abide"	Chorus of Israelites	Bb Major
23. "No more the heathen shall blaspheme"	An Israelite Man	A minor
24. "Breath the pipe, the timbrel sound"	Chorus of Israelites	C Major
24a. "The victor on his lofty seat"	An Israelite Man	?
25. "Not unto us, but to his name"	Judith	F Major
26. "On thy borders, O Jordan"	Ozias, Abra	?
27. "Hear! angels, hear! Celestial choirs"	Chorus of Israelites	D Major
27a. "Here sons of Jacob let us rest"	Chorus of Israelites	D Major
28. "Hear! angels, hear! Celestial choirs"	Chorus of Israelites	D Major

In 1764, Bickerstaff and Arne decidedly disposed of the closing chorus, Hear! angels, hear! Celestial choirs, because they were displeased with how it ended the oratorio. It was replaced with a musical choral setting of Judith's final speech Here sons of Jacob let us rest.

== Performances ==
Judith was first performed at Drury Lane at Lent in 1761, again at Drury Lane in 1762, at Chapel of the Lock Hospital in Grosvenor Place for the benefit of a public charity in 1764, at Kings Theatre in the Haymarket in 1765, Three Choirs Festival in Gloucester in 1766, and at Covent Garden multiple times for charity. During a 1767 benefit concert at Covent Garden, a song from Judith was accompanied with the first ever public appearance of the pianoforte in England. In a 1773 performance at Covent Garden, Arne introduced women's voices into the choruses for the first time.

The airs "O torment great, too great to bear" (by an Israelite woman) and "Sleep, gentle Cherub! Sleep descend" (by Judith) were recorded by Ana Maria Labin and The Mozartists, under Ian Page for the 2015 album Mozart in London on Signum Classics.
