= Judith (homily) =

Judith is a homily written by abbot Ælfric of Eynsham around the year 1000. It is extant in two manuscripts, a fairly complete version being found in Corpus Christi College Cambridge MS 303, and fragments in British Library MS Cotton Otho B.x, which came from the Cotton Library.

The homily is written in Old English alliterative prose. It is 452 verses long. The story paraphrases the Biblical original closely. Ælfric ends the homily with a detailed exegetical interpretation of the story, which he addresses to nuns.

In the first 190 lines, Ælfric introduces king Nebuchadnezzar and Holofernes, the leader of his army, whom he charges with conquering the land of the Jews. Holofernes complies and subdues most countries to the west of Assyria, except Bethulia, a Jewish town which resists the invader. At this point Judith is introduced.

As in the Bible, Judith is depicted as a wealthy, independent widow, who after the death of her husband has chosen to remain single and lead a clean and chaste life (lines 203-207). (Note: And hi wunode on clænnysse æfter hire were / on hyre upflore mid hire þinenum [...] / and heo fæste symle buton on freolsdagum / mid hæran gescryd to hire lice æfre Translation: And she lived in cleanness after her husband['s death] / on her upper storey with her handmaid [...] / and she fasted except on festival days / with haircloth always wrapped around her body.) In his exegesis, Ælfric again stresses Judith's cleanness and chastity (lines 391-394). (Note: forþan the þu wunodest / æfter þinum were wiflice on clænnysse / and god þe gestrangode for þære clænnysse / and forþan þu sylf bist gebletsod on worulde Translation: Because you live / after your husband['s death] woman-like in cleanness / and God strengthened you because of this cleanness / and therefore you are blessed in the world.) Judith is depicted as pious and steadfast in her traditions, even bringing her own food to the Assyrian's tent (lines 270-272). (Note: Ac heo nolde swa þeah his sanda brucan / for his hædenscipe ac heo hæfde gebroht / on hire þinene fætelse hire fercunge Translation: She would not enjoy his meal / because of his paganism but she had brought / in her handmaid's bag her food.) Ælfric thus represents Judith as a figure of identification for the nuns.

Ælfric also stresses Judith's eloquence. She talks her way into the Assyrian's camp (lines 237-241), she talks Holofernes into drinking too much and falling asleep (lines 248-277) and after she has beheaded Holofernes she motivates the Bethulians to fight (lines 312-354).

== See also ==
- Judith (poem), the other major Anglo-Saxon retelling of the story, in epic poetry.
