= Book of Judith =

Deuterocanonical (apocryphal) book of the Old Testament

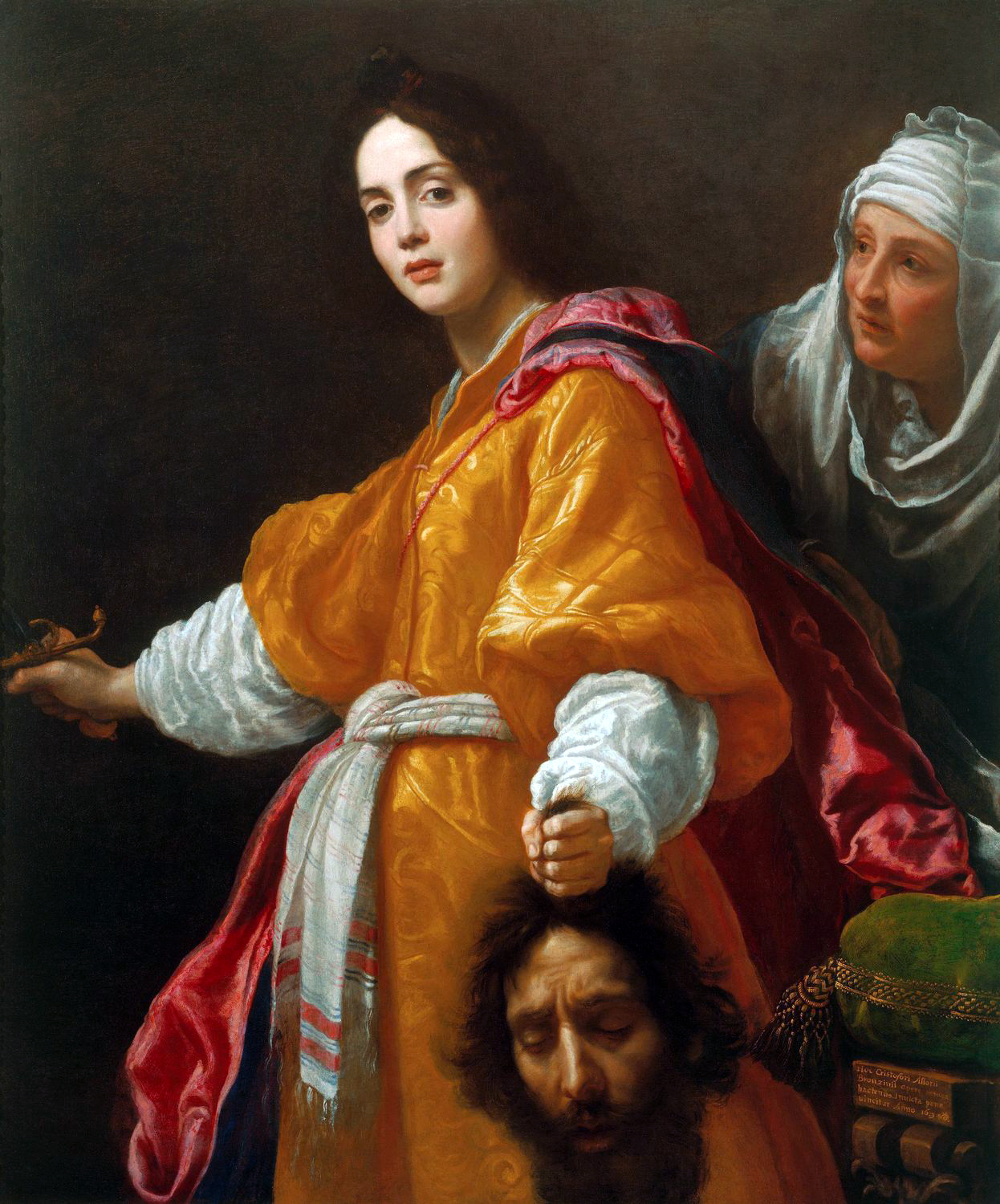
Judith with the Head of Holophernes, by Cristofano Allori, 1613 (Royal Collection, London)

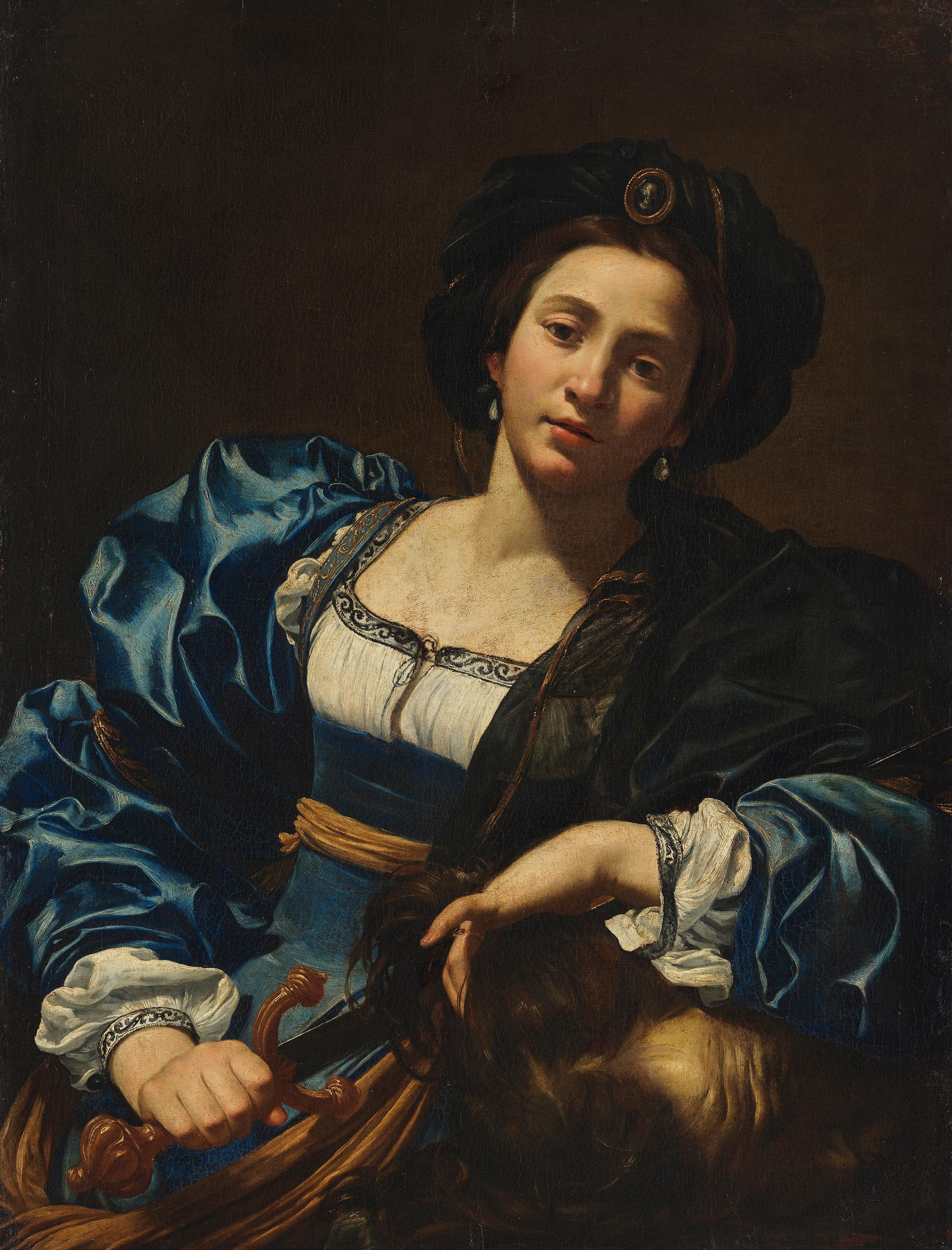
Judith with the Head of Holophernes, by Simon Vouet, (Alte Pinakothek, Munich)

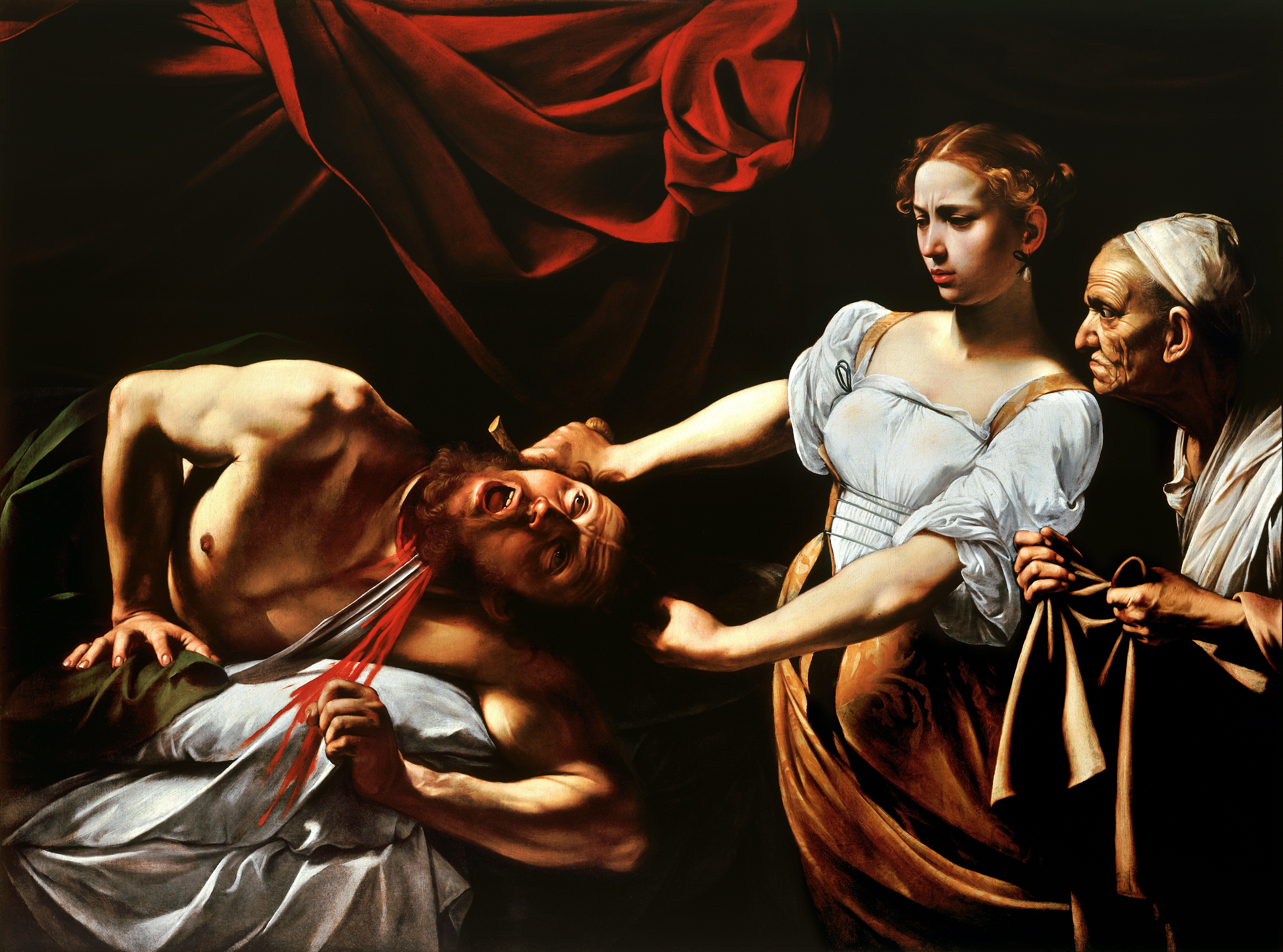
Caravaggio's Judith Beheading Holofernes

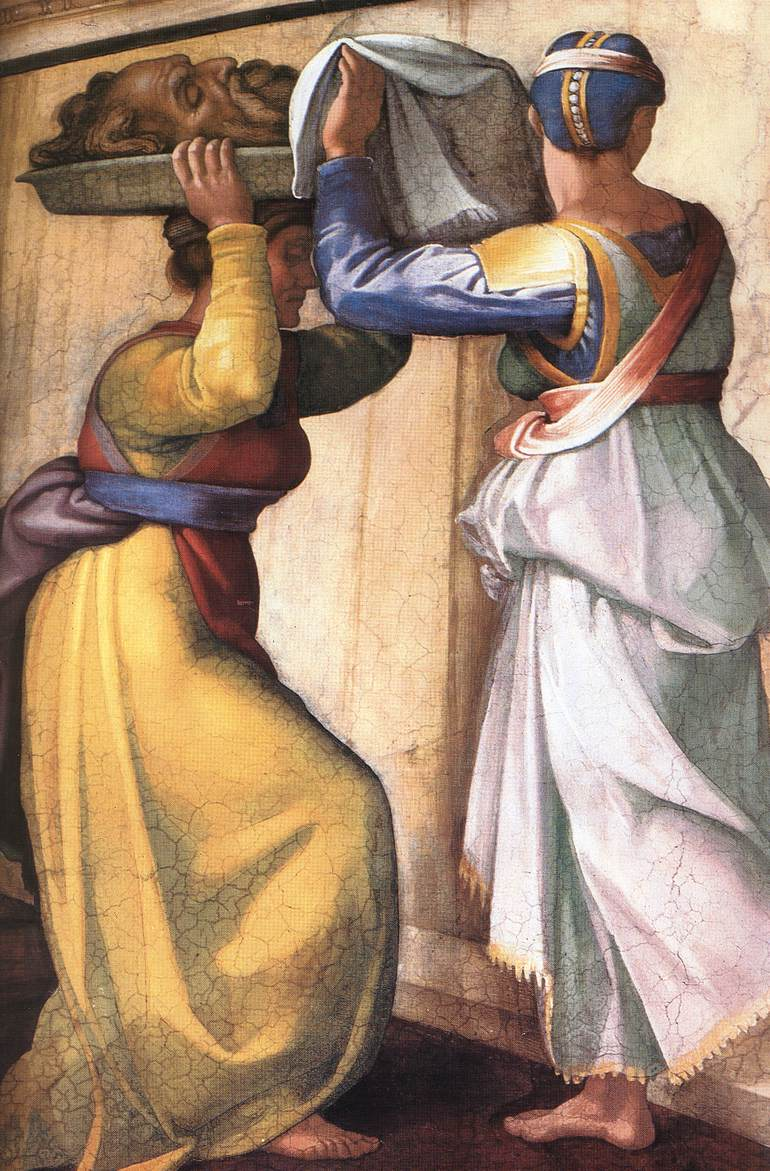
Judith and Holophernes, by Michelangelo, (Sistine Chapel, Vatican City)

The Book of Judith is a deuterocanonical book included in the Septuagint and the Catholic, Eastern Orthodox, Oriental Orthodox, and Church of the East Old Testament of the Bible. It is excluded from the Hebrew canon and assigned by Protestants to the apocrypha. It tells of a Jewish widow, Judith, who uses her beauty and charm to kill an Assyrian general who has besieged her city, Bethulia. With this act, she saves nearby Jerusalem from total destruction. The name Judith (Hebrew: יְהוּדִית, Modern: Yəhūdīt, Tiberian: Yŭhūḏīṯ), meaning "praised" or "Jewess", is the feminine form of Judah.

The extant translated manuscripts from antiquity appear to contain several historical anachronisms, which is why the majority of modern scholars consider the book ahistorical. Instead, the book has been re-classified as a parable, theological novel, or even the first historical novel. Although the majority of Catholic scholars and clergy now view the book as fictional, the Catholic Church had traditionally maintained the book's historicity, assigning its events to the reign of King Manasseh of Judah and that the names were changed in later centuries for an unknown reason. The Jewish Encyclopedia identifies Shechem (modern day Nablus) as "Bethulia", and argues that the name was changed because of the feud between the Jews and Samaritans. If this is the case, it would explain why other names seem anachronistic as well.

== Historical context ==
=== Original language ===
It is not clear whether the Book of Judith was originally written in Hebrew, Aramaic, or Greek, as the oldest existing version is from the Septuagint, a Greek translation of the Hebrew scriptures. However, due to the large number of Hebraisms in the text, it is generally agreed that the book was written in a Semitic language, probably Hebrew or Aramaic, rather than Koine Greek. When Jerome completed his Latin Vulgate translation, he asserted his belief that the book was written "in Chaldean (Aramaic) words". Jerome's Latin translation was based on an Aramaic manuscript and was shorter because he omitted passages that he could not read or understand in the Aramaic that otherwise existed in the Septuagint. The Aramaic manuscript used by Jerome has long since been lost.

Carey A. Moore argued that the Greek text of Judith was a translation from a Hebrew original, and used many examples of conjectured translation errors, Hebraic idioms, and Hebraic syntax. The extant Hebrew manuscripts are very late and only date back to the Middle Ages. The two surviving Hebrew manuscripts of Judith are translated from the Greek Septuagint and the Latin Vulgate.

The Hebrew versions name important figures directly, such as the Seleucid king Antiochus IV Epiphanes, and place the events during the Hellenistic period when the Maccabees battled the Seleucid monarchs. However, because the Hebrew manuscripts mention kingdoms that had not existed for hundreds of years by the time of the Seleucids, it is unlikely that these were the original names in the text. In the minority, Helmut Engel and Jeremy Corley argued that Judith was originally composed in Greek that was carefully modeled after Hebrew and pointed out "Septuagintalisms" in the vocabulary and phrasing of the Greek text.

=== Canonicity ===
==== In Judaism ====
While the author was likely Jewish, there is no evidence aside from its inclusion in the Septuagint that the Book of Judith was ever considered authoritative or a candidate for canonicity by any Jewish group. The Masoretic Text of the Hebrew Bible does not contain it; it is not found among the Dead Sea Scrolls or any early Rabbinic literature. Speculated reasons for its exclusion include the possible lateness of its composition, possible Greek origin, apparent support of the Hasmonean dynasty (to which the early rabbinate was opposed), and perhaps the brash and seductive character of Judith herself.

After disappearing from circulation among Jews for over a millennium, however, references to the Book of Judith and the figure of Judith herself resurfaced in the religious literature of crypto-Jews who escaped Christian persecution after the capitulation of the Caliphate of Córdoba. The renewed interest took the form of "tales of the heroine, liturgical poems, commentaries on the Talmud, and passages in Jewish legal codes." Although the text does not mention Hanukkah, it became customary for a Hebrew midrashic variant of the Judith story to be read on the Shabbat of Hanukkah as the story of Hanukkah takes place during the time of the Hasmonean dynasty.

That midrash, whose heroine is portrayed as gorging the antagonist on cheese and wine before cutting off his head, may have formed the basis of the minor Jewish tradition to eat dairy products during Hanukkah. In that respect, the Jewry of Europe during the Middle Ages appear to have viewed Judith as the Maccabean-Hasmonean counterpart to Queen Esther, the heroine of the holiday of Purim. The textual reliability of the Book of Judith was also taken for granted, to the extent that biblical commentator Nachmanides (Ramban) quoted several passages from a Peshitta (Syriac version) of Judith in support of his rendering of Deuteronomy 21:14.

==== In Christianity ====
Although early Christians, such as Clement of Rome, Tertullian, and Clement of Alexandria, read and used the Book of Judith, some of the oldest Christian canons, including the Bryennios List (1st/2nd century), that of Melito of Sardis (2nd century), and Origen (3rd century), do not include it. Jerome, when he produced his Latin translation of the Hebrew Bible, the Vulgate, counted it among the apocrypha, (though he translated it and later seemed to quote it as scripture), as did Athanasius, Cyril of Jerusalem, and Epiphanius of Salamis.

Many influential fathers and doctors of the Church, including Augustine, Basil of Caesarea, Tertullian, John Chrysostom, Ambrose, Bede the Venerable and Hilary of Poitiers, considered the book sacred scripture both before and after councils that formally declared it part of the biblical canon. In a 405 letter, Pope Innocent I declared it part of the Christian canon. In Jerome's Prologue to Judith, he claims that the Book of Judith was "found by the Nicene Council to have been counted among the number of the Sacred Scriptures". No such declaration has been found in the Canons of Nicaea, and it is uncertain whether Jerome was referring to the book's use during the council's discussion or spurious canons attributed to that council.

Regardless of Judith's status at Nicaea, the book was also accepted as scripture by the councils of Rome (382), Hippo (393), Carthage (397), and Florence (1442) and eventually dogmatically defined as canonical by the Catholic Church in 1546 in the Council of Trent. However, Rome, Hippo, and Carthage were all local councils (unlike Nicaea, an ecumenical council). The Eastern Orthodox Church also accepts Judith as inspired scripture; this was confirmed in the Synod of Jerusalem in 1672. The canonicity of Judith is typically rejected by Protestants, who accept as the Old Testament only those books that are found in the Jewish canon. Martin Luther viewed the book as an allegory, but listed it as the first of the eight writings in his Apocrypha, which is located between the Old Testament and New Testament of the Luther Bible. Though Lutheranism views the Book of Judith as non-canonical, it is deemed edifying for matters of morality, as well as devotional use. In Anglicanism, it has the intermediate authority of the Apocrypha of the Old Testament and is regarded as useful or edifying, but is not to be taken as a basis for establishing doctrine.

Judith is also referred to in chapter 28 of 1 Meqabyan, a book considered canonical in the Ethiopian Orthodox Tewahedo Church.

== Contents ==
=== Plot summary ===
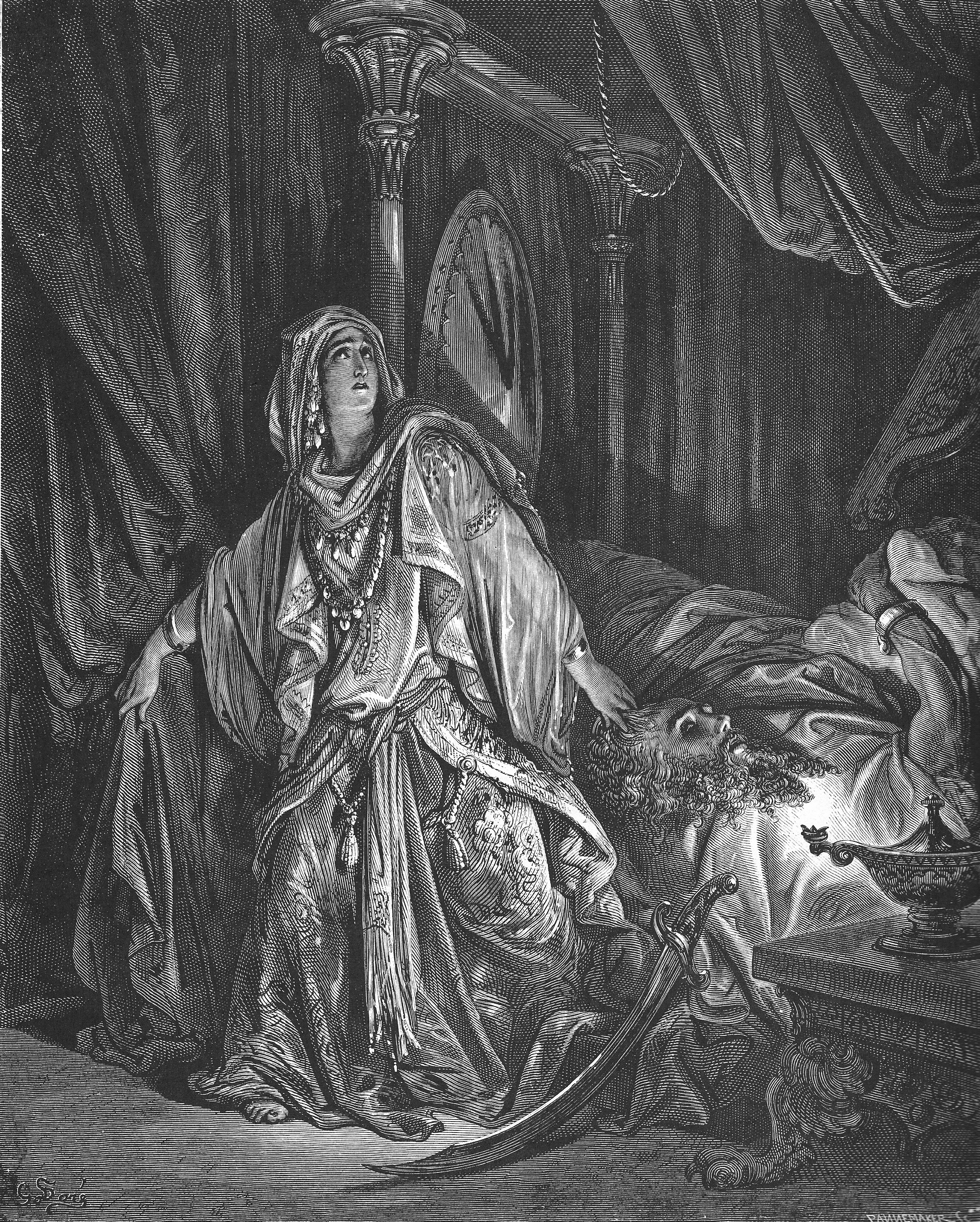
Judith and Holofernes, an engraving done by Gustave Doré in 1866. Doré also did another engraving from the book: Judith Shows the Head of Holofernes.

The story revolves around Judith, a daring and beautiful widow, who is upset with her Judean countrymen for not trusting God to deliver them from their foreign conquerors. She goes with her loyal maid to the camp of the Assyrian general, Holofernes, with whom she slowly ingratiates herself, promising him information on the people of Israel. Gaining his trust, she is allowed access to his tent one night as he lies in a drunken stupor. She decapitates him, then takes his head back to her fearful countrymen. The Assyrians, having lost their leader, disperse, and Israel is saved. Though she is courted by many, Judith remains unmarried for the rest of her life.

=== Literary structure ===
The Book of Judith can be split into two parts or "acts" of approximately equal length. Chapters 1–7 describe the rise of the threat to Israel, led by king Nebuchadnezzar and his general Holofernes, and is concluded as Holofernes' worldwide campaign has converged at the mountain pass where Judith's village, Bethulia, is located. Chapters 8–16 then introduce Judith and depict her heroic actions to save her people. The first part, although at times tedious in its description of the military developments, develops important themes by alternating battles with reflections and rousing action with rest. In contrast, the second half is devoted mainly to Judith's strength of character and the beheading scene.

The New Oxford Annotated Apocrypha identifies a clear chiastic pattern in both "acts", in which the order of events is reversed at a central moment in the narrative (i.e., abcc'b'a').

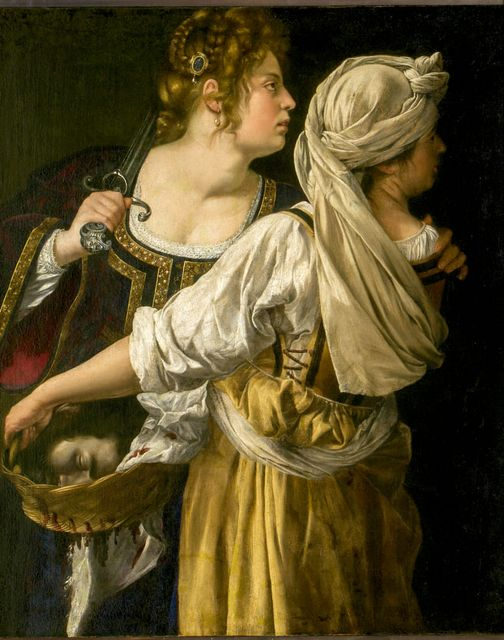
Judith and her maidservant, Artemisia Gentileschi, Italy, 1619

Part I (1:1–7:23)

A. Campaign against disobedient nations; the people surrender (1:1–2:13)

B. Israel is "greatly terrified" (2:14–3:10)

C. Joakim prepares for war (4:1–15)

D. Holofernes talks with Achior (5:1–6.9)

E. Achior is expelled by Assyrians (6:10–13)
E'. Achior is received in the village of Bethulia (6:14–15)

D'. Achior talks with the people (6:16–21)

C'. Holofernes prepares for war (7:1–3)

B'. Israel is "greatly terrified" (7:4–5)

A'. Campaign against Bethulia; the people want to surrender (7:6–32)

Part II (8:1–16:25)

A. Introduction of Judith (8:1–8)

B. Judith plans to save Israel (8:9–10:8), including her extended prayer (9:1–14)

C. Judith and her maid leave Bethulia (10:9–10)

D. Judith beheads Holofernes (10:11–13:10a)

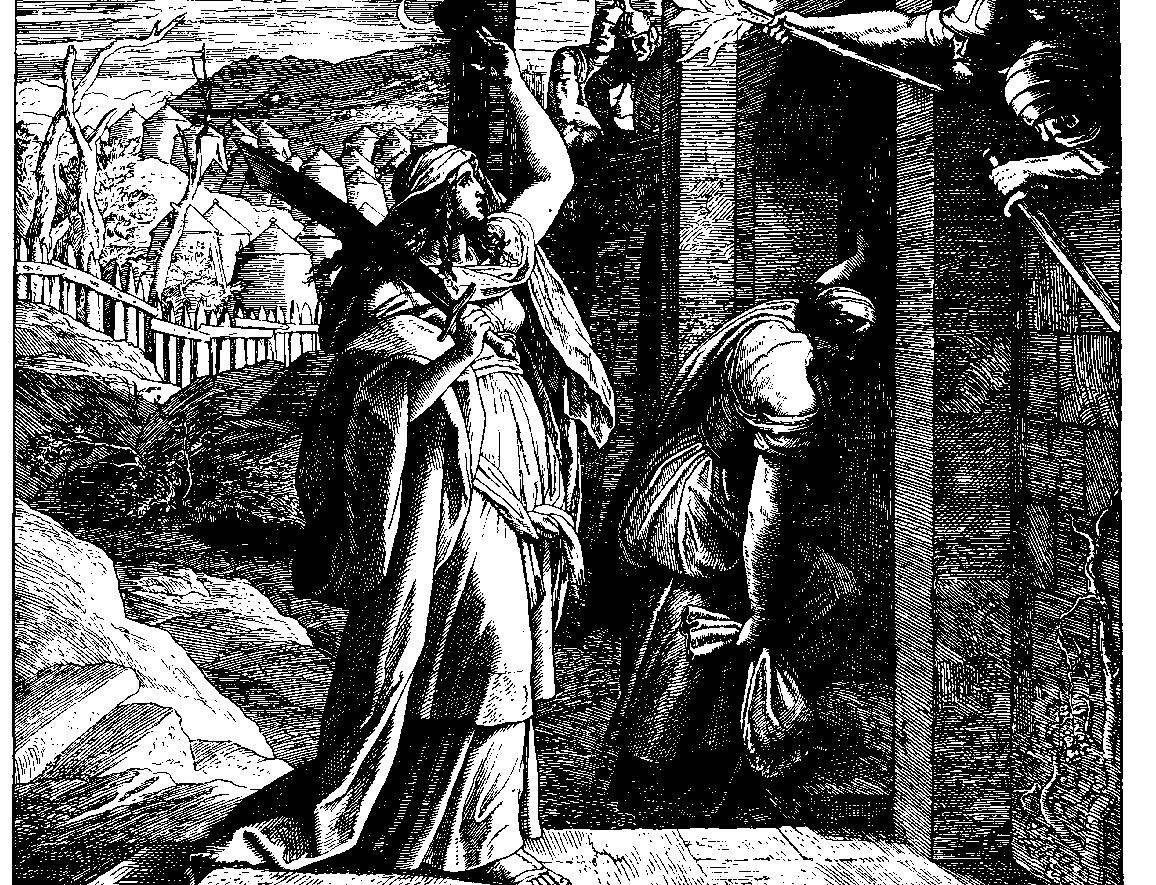
Judith Returns to Bethulia, 1860 woodcut by Julius Schnorr von Karolsfeld

C'. Judith and her maid return to Bethulia (13.10b–11)

B'. Judith plans the destruction of Israel's enemy (13:12–16:20)

A'. Conclusion about Judith (16.1–25)

Similarly, parallels within Part II are noted in comments within the New American Bible Revised Edition: Judith summons a town meeting in Judith 8:10 in advance of her expedition and is acclaimed by such a meeting in Judith 13:12–13; Uzziah blesses Judith in advance in Judith 8:5 and afterwards in Judith 13:18–20.

=== Literary genre ===
Most contemporary exegetes, such as Biblical scholar Gianfranco Ravasi, generally tend to ascribe Judith to one of several contemporaneous literary genres, reading it as an extended parable in the form of a historical fiction, or a propaganda literary work from the days of the Seleucid oppression.

It has also been called "an example of the ancient Jewish novel in the Greco-Roman period". Other scholars note that Judith fits within and even incorporates the genre of "salvation traditions" from the Old Testament, particularly the story of Deborah and Jael (Judges 4–5), who seduced and inebriated the Canaanite commander Sisera before hammering a tent-peg into his forehead.

There are also thematic connections to the revenge of Simeon and Levi on Shechem after the rape of Dinah in Genesis 34.

In the Christian West from the patristic period on, Judith was invoked in a wide variety of texts as a multi-faceted allegorical figure. As a "Mulier sancta", she personified the Church and many virtues – Humility, Justice, Fortitude, Chastity (the opposite of Holofernes' vices Pride, Tyranny, Decadence, Lust) – and she was, like the other heroic women of the Hebrew scriptural tradition, made into a typological prefiguration of the Virgin Mary. Her gender made her a natural example of the biblical paradox of "strength in weakness"; she is thus paired with David and her beheading of Holofernes paralleled with that of Goliath – both deeds saved the Covenant People from a militarily superior enemy.

=== Main characters ===
Judith, the protagonist of the book, introduced in chapter 8 as a God-fearing woman, she is the daughter of Merari, a Simeonite, and widow of a certain Manasseh or Manasses, a wealthy farmer. She sends her maid or "waitingwoman" to summon Uzziah so she can challenge his decision to capitulate to the Assyrians if God has not rescued the people of Bethulia within five days, and she uses her charm to become an intimate friend of Holofernes, but beheads him allowing Israel to counter-attack the Assyrians. Judith's maid, not named in the story, remains with her throughout the narrative and is given her freedom as the story ends.

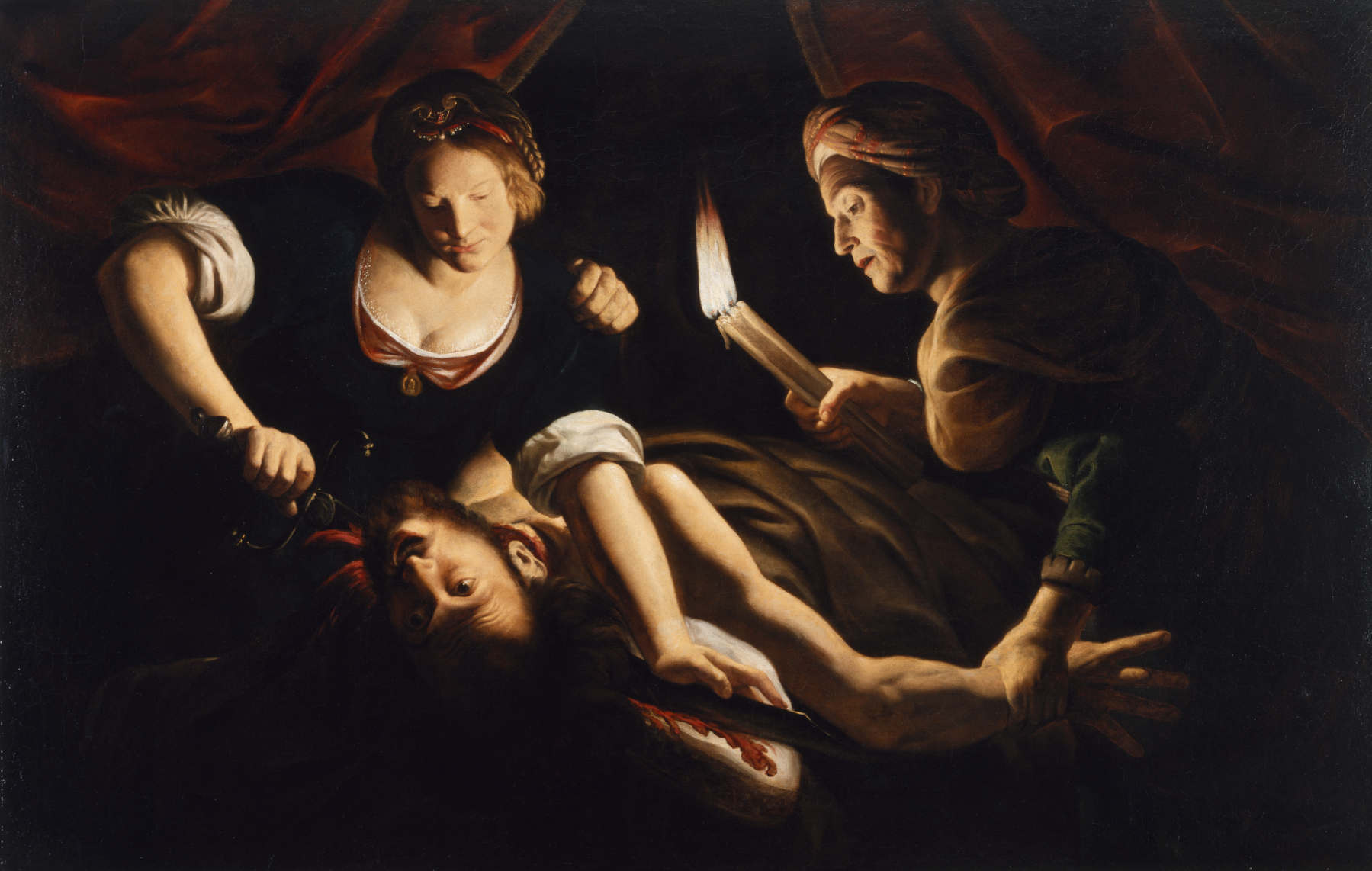
Painting by Trophime Bigot (c. 1579–1650, also known as Master of the Candlelight), depicting Judith and Holofernes. The Walters Art Museum.

Holofernes, the antagonist of the book. He is a dedicated soldier of his king, general-in-chief of his army, whom he wants to see exalted in all lands. He is given the task of destroying the rebels who did not support the king of Nineveh in his resistance against Cheleud and the king of Media, until Israel also becomes a target of his military campaign. Judith's courage and charm occasion his death.

Nebuchadnezzar, the king of Nineveh and Assyria. He is so proud that he wants to affirm his strength as a sort of divine power, although Holofernes, his Turtan (commanding general), goes beyond the king's orders when he calls on the western nations to "worship only Nebuchadnezzar, and ... invoke him as a god". Holofernes is ordered to take revenge on those who refused to ally themselves with Nebuchadnezzar.

Achior, an Ammonite leader at Nebuchadnezzar's court; in chapter 5 he summarises the history of Israel and warns the king of Assyria of the power of their God, the "God of heaven", but is mocked. He is protected by the people of Bethulia and is Judaized, and circumcised on hearing what Judith has accomplished. (Note: The admission of Achior the Ammonite to the House of Israel, "with all the succession of his kindred until this present day", occasions some discussion by Thomas Aquinas in his Summa Theologica, where he notes that Deuteronomy 23:3 prescribes that "An Ammonite or Moabite shall not enter the assembly of the Lord; even to the tenth generation none of his descendants shall enter the assembly of the Lord forever", but in this case "a dispensation" would have been applied.)

Bagoas, or Vagao (Vulgate), the eunuch who had charge over Holofernes' personal affairs. His name is Persian for a eunuch. (Note: Haydock also notes that Ovid's poem Amores refers to a character called Bagoas, who was entrusted with the task of guarding his mistress.) He brought in Judith to recline with Holofernes and was the first one who discovered his beheading.

Uzziah or Oziah, governor of Bethulia; together with Cabri and Carmi, he rules over Judith's city. When the city is besieged by the Assyrians and the water supply dries up, he agrees to the people's call to surrender if God has not rescued them within five days, a decision challenged as "rash" by Judith.

=== Judith's prayer ===
Chapter 9 constitutes Judith's "extended prayer", "loudly proclaimed" in advance of her actions in the following chapters. This runs to 14 verses in English versions, 19 verses in the Vulgate.

== Historicity of Judith ==
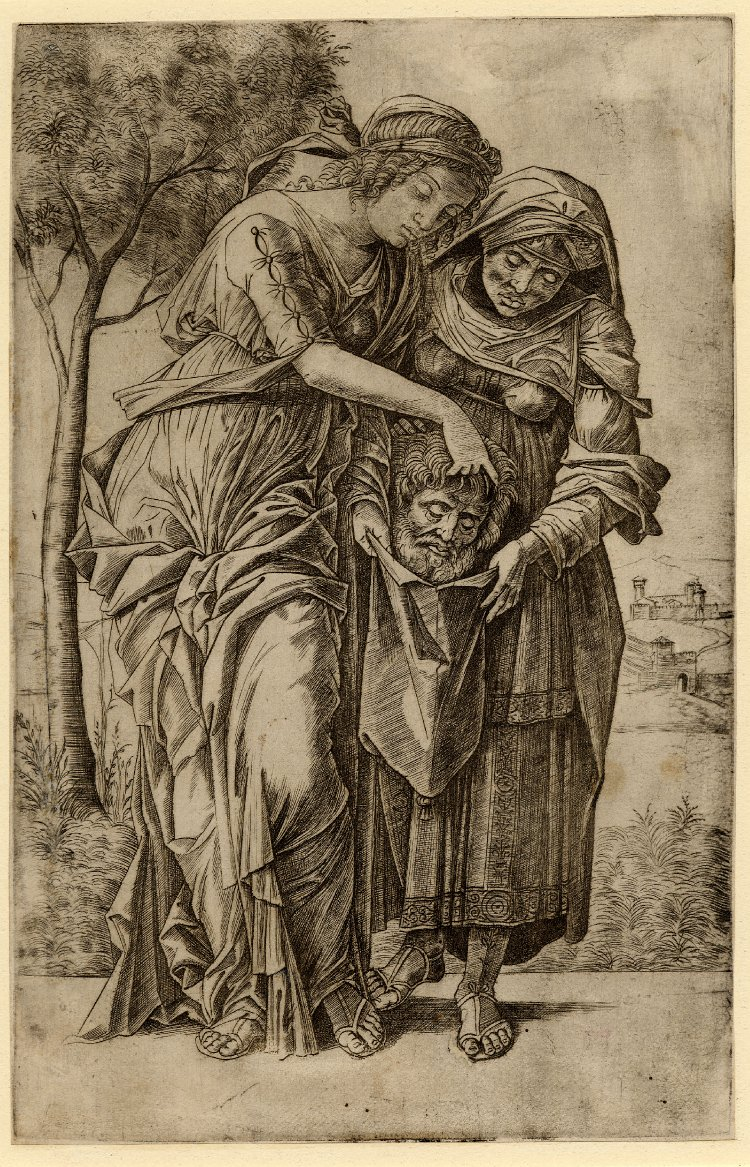
Engraving by Girolamo Mocetto, 1500

Today, it is generally accepted that the Book of Judith's historicity is dubious. The New Oxford Annotated Apocrypha writes that the book's "fictional nature is evident from its blending of history and fiction, beginning in the very first verse, and is too prevalent thereafter to be considered the result of mere historical mistakes." The names of people are either unknown to history or appear to be anachronistic, and many of the place names are also unknown. Typically, modern Catholic scholars view the book as historical fiction, and this is shown in the New American Bible translation, published by the U.S. Conference of Catholic Bishops. Despite this modern consensus, the Catholic Church long considered the book to be a historical document, and it is included with the other historical books in the Old Testament of Catholic Bibles. Regarding this, Jean-Baptiste Glaire wrote: "It [the Book of Judith] is historical, not a mixture of fact and fiction. This is proven by the narrative as a whole and its details, which provide us with precise information about Judith's history, geography, chronology, and genealogy. The ancient Jewish prayers for the first and second Sabbaths of the Feast of Dedication contain a summary of the Book of Judith, which also shows that the Israelites believed in the reality of the events recounted therein, for they could not have thanked God for an imaginary deliverance. Judith, 16:31 [in the Vulgate], moreover, mentions a festival instituted in memory of this heroine's victory. Universal tradition has accepted the strictly historical character of the Book of Judith. No one, until Luther, called it into question." The Catholic Church has not officially commented on the matter, although Pope John Paul II once remarked in 1995: "The Books of Tobit, Judith, and Esther, although dealing with the history of the Chosen People, have the character of allegorical and moral narrative rather than history properly so called." Various scholars have pointed out possible inspirations to events in Judith elsewhere in the Old Testament. Luis Alonso Schökel noted that Achior could have been inspired by important gentiles such as Rahab of Jericho from Joshua or Balaam from Numbers, and that Judith and Holofernes could have been inspired by Jael and Sisera from Judges, or David and Goliath from 1 Samuel.

However, some Catholic scholars still hold to the traditional view that Judith is based on a historical event, and their arguments frequently note Judith's lengthy genealogy (the longest given to a woman in the Bible) and the exact numbers of troops given, traits that match with other historical books in the Old Testament. Even some early protestant scholars, notably Anglican archbishop and historian James Ussher and Reformed scholar Franciscus Junius, viewed the book of Judith as a historical document. Catholic scholar Taylor Marshall wrote about skeptics of the book: "they claim that both Tobit and Judith (and sometimes Jonah) contain so many obvious historical errors that the errors were placed there by God in order to tip off the reader to the books’ fictional quality. ... Tobit is specific and lists historical times and places. To interpret Tobit as inspired fiction seems to fall out of line with Pope Pius XII’s Divino Afflante Spiritu which holds that we study Scripture mindful of the genre of a book." Because of this, there have been various attempts by both scholars and clergy to understand the characters and events in the Book as either an allegorical representation of actual events, or a historical document that had been altered or translated improperly. In the foreword to his translation of Judith, Catholic theologian Antoine Augustin Calmet refuted Hugo Grotius, who had claimed that the book was allegorical, writing: "All this is undoubtedly invented with great skill and wit; but after all, it is only a game of the mind and a conjecture, which, however futile and felicitous it may be, can never attain the slightest degree of truth and certainty without positive and factual proof. One can, through negotiation, overturn this entire fine edifice of Grotius and show him, by following his method, that the history of the Patriarch Joseph, for example, that of Moses, those of David, and of Solomon, are nothing but parables, as is that of Judith. Allusions are never lacking when one sets out to find some mystery or figure in a historical event. The stories just cited are not recounted in a more continuous or detailed manner than that of Judith. If, therefore, the former are undeniably true, why should this one not be as well? One must find in Judith facts or circumstances incompatible with the true histories of the Jews, accepted by everyone, if one wishes to acquire the right to treat it as a parable and a work of fiction. And indeed, that is precisely what those who dispute the truth of the Story of Judith have not failed to do. They have made every effort to discover errors and contradictions in it."

The idea that the names in the book were altered is not without precedent. The practice of changing names has been observed in documents from the Second Temple period, such as the Damascus Document, which apparently contains references to an uncertain location referred to by the pseudonym of "Damascus". The writings of the Jewish historian Flavius Josephus also frequently differ from the Biblical record regarding the names of the high priests of Israel. Elsewhere in the Bible, there are also names of rulers that are unknown to history, such as Darius the Mede from the Book of Daniel or Ahasuerus from the Book of Esther. The large size of the Assyrian army and the large size of the Median walls in the book have also been criticized, but both of these have been attested to elsewhere in the Bible and in secular historical records. The Assyrian army that besieged Jerusalem in 2 Kings 19 was said to have been 185,000 strong, a number several tens of thousands larger than the Assyrian army described in the book of Judith. Also, the Greek historian Herodotus described the walls of Babylon to have been similar in size and extravagance to the walls of Ecbatana in the book of Judith. Herodotus's account was corroborated by similar accounts of the scale of the walls of Babylon by the historians Strabo, Ctesias, and Cleitarchus. The identity of the "Nebuchadnezzar" in the book has been debated for thousands of years and various rulers have been proposed by scholars, including Ashurbanipal, Artaxerxes III, Tigranes the Great, Antiochus IV Epiphanes, Cambyses II, Xerxes I, and Darius the Great.

=== Identification of Nebuchadnezzar with Ashurbanipal ===
For hundreds of years, the most generally accepted view within the Catholic Church is that the book of Judith occurs during the reign of Ashurbanipal, a notoriously cruel and brutal Assyrian king whose reign was marked by various military campaigns and invasions. Ashurbanipal ruled the Neo-Assyrian Empire from Nineveh in 668 to 627 BCE. The Challoner Douay-Rheims Bible states that the events of the book begin in A.M. 3347, or Ante C. 657, which would be during the reign of Ashurbanipal. This would be the twelfth year of Ashurbanipal's reign, which lines up with the book of Judith beginning in the twelfth year of "Nebuchadnezzar". If the rest of the book occurs in the seventeenth and eighteenth years of Ashurbanipal, the years would be 653 and 652 BCE, corresponding to revolts and military campaigns across Ashurbanipal's empire. The traditional Catholic view that the book dates to the reign of Manasseh corresponds to Ashurbanipal's reign, and Ashurbanipal's records name Manasseh as one of a number of vassals who assisted his campaign against Egypt. The profanation of the temple described in Judith 4:3 might have been that under king Hezekiah (see 2 Chronicles 33:18–19), who reigned between c. 715 and 686 BCE. And in that same verse, the return from the dispersion (often assumed to refer to the Babylonian captivity) might refer to the chaos that resulted in people fleeing Jerusalem after Manasseh was taken captive by the Assyrians. The reinforcement of the cities as described in Judith 4:5 matches up with the reinforcement that happened in response to the Assyrians under Manasseh. Judith 4:6 claims that the High Priest of Israel was in charge of the country at the time. However, it is generally assumed that the book takes place after Manasseh's return from captivity in Assyria and his subsequent repentance. Nicolaus Serarius, Giovanni Menochio and Thomas Worthington speculated that Manasseh was busy fortifying Jerusalem at the time (which also fits with 2 Chronicles 33) and left the matters of the rest of the Israelites to the high priest. Others, such as Houbigant and Haydock, speculate that the events of the book occurred while Manasseh was still captive in Babylon. Whatever the case, it was a typical policy of the time for the Israelites to follow the high priest if the king could not or would not lead. Manasseh is thought by most scholars to have joined a widespread rebellion against Ashurbanipal that was led by his brother, Šamaš-šuma-ukin. Contemporary sources make reference to the many allies of Chaldea (governed by Šamaš-šuma-ukin), including the Kingdom of Judah, which were subjects of Assyria and are mentioned in the Book of Judith as victims of Ashurbanipal's Western campaign. The Encyclopædia Britannica identified "Judah" as one of the vassal kingdoms in Šamaš-šuma-ukin's rebel coalition against Ashurbanipal. The Cambridge Ancient History also confirms that "several princes of Palestine" supported Šamaš-šuma-ukin in the revolt against Ashurbanipal, which seemingly confirms Manasseh's involvement in the revolt. This would explain the reinforcement of the cities described in this book and why the Israelites and other western kingdoms rejected "Nebuchadnezzar's" order for conscription, because many of the vassal rulers of the west supported Šamaš-šuma-ukin. It is of further interest that Šamaš-šuma-ukin's civil war broke out in 652 BCE, the eighteenth year of Ashurbanipal's reign. The book of Judith states that "Nebuchadnezzar" ravaged the western part of the empire in the eighteenth year of his reign. If the events of this book did occur during Ashurbanipal's reign, it is possible that Assyrians did not record it because they were preoccupied with Šamaš-šuma-ukin's revolt, which was not crushed for years to come. Ashurbanipal's successful crushing of Šamaš-šuma-ukin's civil war also prevented the Assyrians from retaking Egypt, which gained independence from Assyria around 655 BCE.

Numerous theologians, including Antoine Augustin Calmet, suspect that the ultimate goal of the western campaign was for the Assyrians to sack Egypt, because Holofernes appeared to be heading directly towards Egypt on his campaign through the west. If Calmet and others are correct in suspecting that Holofernes was intending to sack Egypt, this would give further evidence to the theory that the book is set during the reign of Ashurbanipal, who had previously sacked Thebes in 663 BCE. The view that the book of Judith was written during the reigns of Manasseh and Ashurbanipal was held by a great number of Catholic scholars, including Calmet, George Leo Haydock, Thomas Worthington, Richard Challoner, Giovanni Stefano Menochio, Sixtus of Siena, Robert Bellarmine, Charles François Houbigant, Jean-Baptiste Glaire, Nicolaus Serarius, Pierre Daniel Huet and Bernard de Montfaucon. Many of these theologians are cited and quoted by Calmet in his own commentary on Judith. Calmet listed all of "the main objections that can be made against the truth of Judith's Story" and spent the rest of his commentary on the book addressing them, stating: "But all this did not bother Catholic writers. There were a large number of them who answered it expertly, and who undertook to show that there is nothing incompatible in this history, neither with Scripture, nor even with profane (secular) history". Glaire wrote: "As for its date, some place it as far back as 784 BC, while others place it as far back as 117 or 118 AD. However, since Assyriological discoveries allow us to assert with a very high degree of probability that the events recounted in this book took place during the reign of Ashurbanipal, son of Esaraddon, grandson of Sennacherib, king of Assyria, during Manasseh's captivity in Babylon. ... Not all the connections we have just made are certain, but it is impossible not to find them very striking." There were other Catholic writers who held this view as well, such as Fulcran Vigouroux, who went even farther, identifying the battle between "Nebuchadnezzar, king of the Assyrians" and "Arphaxad, the king of the Medes" as the battle that occurred between Ashurbanipal and Phraortes. This battle occurred during the seventeenth year of Ashurbanipal's reign, and the book of Judith states that this battle occurred in the seventeenth year of "Nebuchadnezzar's" reign. Jacques-Bénigne Bossuet expressed a similar view regarding this. The scholars used specific examples from the text that line up with Manasseh's reign. As argued by Vigouroux, the two battles mentioned in the Septuagint version of the Book of Judith are a reference to the clash of the two empires in 658–657 and to Phraortes' death in battle in 653, after which Ashurbanipal continued his military actions with a large campaign starting with the Battle of the Ulai River (653 BCE) in the eighteenth year of his reign. The King of the "Elymeans" (Elamites), called "Arioch", is referenced in Judith 1:6. If the twelfth year of "Nebuchadnezzar" is to be identified as the twelfth year of Ashurbanipal, this Arioch would be identified as Teumman, who rebelled against Ashurbanipal on many occasions, eventually being killed at the Battle of the Ulai in 653 BCE, around the time Catholic theologians place "Nebuchadnezzar's" western campaign.

Both James Ussher and Franciscus Junius again assign the events of the book of Judith to the reign of Manasseh. Ussher wrote in his 1650 book Annals of the World: "After Assaridinus or Esarhaddon, Saosduchinus ruled both of the empires of Assyria and Babylon for 20 years. In the book of Judith that was written in the Chaldee language by some Jew living in Babylon, he is called Nabuchodonosor, a name common to all kings of Babylon. However he was called the king of Assyria and is said to have reigned in the great city of Nineveh. The learned Franc. Junius thinks that Saosduchinus is the same person as Merodach-Baladan of the Bible, the grandfather of that Nebucadnetzar and great grandfather of Nebuchadnezzar. Hence he thinks it was Merodach-Baladan who took king Manasseh prisoner to Babylon and released him later." However, Ussher immediately afterwards refutes the identification of the king of Judith with Merodach-Baladan. In his annals, Ussher continues to illustrate why Saosduchinus was the son of Esarhaddon and the king of Judith. The identification of "Nebuchadnezzar" with Ashurbanipal was so widespread that it was the only identification in English Catholic Bibles for several hundred years. The 1738 Challoner revision of the Douay Rheims Bible and the Haydock Biblical Commentary specifically declare that "Nabuchodonosor" was "known as 'Saosduchin' to profane historians and succeeded 'Asarhaddan' in the kingdom of the Assyrians". This could only have been Ashurbanipal, as he was the successor of Esarhaddon, his father. However, while Nebuchadnezzar and Ashurbanipal's campaigns show clear and direct parallels, the main incident of Judith's intervention has not been found in any record aside from this book. An additional difficulty with this theory is that the reasons for the name changes are difficult to understand, unless the text was transmitted without character names before they were by a later copyist or translator, who lived centuries later. Catholic apologist Jimmy Akin argues the possibility that the book of Judith is a roman à clef, a historical record with different names for people and places. Ashurbanipal is never referenced by name in the Bible, except perhaps for the corrupt form "Asenappar" in 2 Chronicles and Ezra 4:10 or possibly the anonymous title "The King of Assyria" in 2 Chronicles (33:11), which means his name might have never been recorded by Jewish historians, which could explain the lack of his name in the book of Judith.

=== Identification of Nebuchadnezzar with Cambyses II ===
According to Antoine Augustin Calmet and Sulpicius Severus, the most common identification of the king in the book among Jewish people in antiquity was Cambyses II, who was the second king of the Achaemenid Empire from 530 to 522 BCE. Calmet wrote: "The ancient tradition of the Hebrews, in the time of Eusebius, was that the second Nebuchadnezzar, mentioned in Judith, was Cambyses; and that it was under his reign that this history had happened. This opinion has been widely followed. It is found in Suidas, in Bede the Venerable, in Rabanus Maurus, in Glycas, in Otto of Freising, in Hugh the Cardinal, in Liran, in the Scholastic History, and in various other authors. St. Augustine does not express the name of the prince, and he places the history between Cyrus and Darius. Now between these two princes, there is only Cambyses. But this opinion is untenable for several reasons. First, the capital of Cambyses was not Nineveh, but Babylon. 2nd. Cambyses reigned only seven years and three months, and Nebuchadnezzar did not begin the war against Arphaxad, that in the thirteenth year of his reign. Finally, all the provinces which Holofernes conquers in the Book of Judith, were constantly subjugated to Cambyses, from the beginning of his reign, and always remained subject to him, and Judea in particular obeyed him. And consequently, we cannot understand that of Cambyses." Calmet also wrote that those who supported this identification identified the author of the book as Joshua the son of Jehozadak, the first high priest of Israel after the reconstruction of the temple and a contemporary of Cambyses II. Furthermore, Cambyses could not have done battle against the Medes since the kingdom no longer existed at that time. Cambyses also never reigned in Nineveh, which had been destroyed for almost 100 years at that time. Cambyses was also never “king of the Assyrians”, he was the second king of the Persians. For these reasons, the theory that the book was written about Cambyses has largely been abandoned. Although the identification of Nebuchadnezzar with Cambyses II died out in antiquity, there were some who still held to the identification into the middle ages, possibly because the book apparently refers to the return from the Babylonian Captivity. Around 1000, Ælfric of Eynsham did a homily on the book of Judith in Old English, writing: "Now the other king who was named Nebuchadnezzar in Latin was in the land of Syria, the son of Cyrus whom we said before, and his nickname was given as Cambisus. So, then Cambisus declared to fight against Arfaxad, the king of the Medes, and he slew him, and through that victory he raised himself into a very proud spirit, and he sent his messengers from every side of him to all of the realms of people which lay within his kingdom." However, the second temple wasn't rebuilt until 516 BCE, six years after the death of Cambyses in 522. Since Judith refers to the temple in the present tense, this is another reason the Cambyses identification fell out of favor.

=== Identification of Nebuchadnezzar with Antiochus IV Epiphanes ===
In the middle ages, the late Hebrew and Yiddish manuscripts of Judith change the name "Nebuchadnezzar" to "Antiochus", referring to king Antiochus IV Epiphanes, king of the Seleucid Empire from 175 to 164 BCE, and place the events during the Hellenistic period when the Maccabees battled the Seleucid monarchs. However, because the Hebrew manuscripts mention the other kingdoms in the book that had not existed for hundreds of years by the time of the Seleucids, it is unlikely that these were the original names in the text. Nevertheless, the idea that the book was written during the Maccabean period not only persists to this day, it is the current mainstream view of the book's composition, held by various scholars including Bruce M. Metzger, Alberto Soggin, James King West, Lawrence Wills, Benedikt Otzen, Demetrius R. Dumm, Luis Alonso Schökel, Carey A. Moore and D.A. deSilva. This viewpoint was notably held by some protestant critics after the Protestant Reformation, notably by Hugo Grotius. Antoine Calmet addressed Grotius's view in his preface to Judith: "The play was composed, says Grotius, during the time of the execution of Antiochus Epiphanes, and before this prince defiled the Temple by placing an idol there. The author wished to rally the Jews through the hope of swift assistance. Judith signifies Judea; Bethulia the Temple, or the House of God. The sword that slams from Bethulia represents the prayers of the Saints. Nebuchadnezzar designates the Devil; and Assyria, pride, or arrogance. Antiochus Epiphanes is the instrument used by the Devil. The writer we are discussing has obscurely designated him by the name Holofernes, which can be translated as: the Oil-Bearer, or the Satellite of the Serpent. The high priest Eliacim, or Joakim, signifies that the Lord will raise up a defender for us, or will himself come to our aid. Judith is depicted as a widow of rare beauty and renowned virtue. Such was Judea in the context of Antiochus's persecution. It boasts in the body of this work, of not having imitated the prevarications of its fathers, and of not having worshipped foreign gods.” Indeed, the viewpoint of Antiochus being the inspiration for the king of Judith has a fair amount of internal support. Like the Nebuchadnezzar of Judith, Antiochus claimed to be a god and demanded worship. Antiochus also ruled over most of the countries mentioned in the book as victims of the western campaign. The Jewish Temple was operational in the time of Antiochus and was desecrated by his religious policies. The book also contains apparent references to Greek customs, which would support a Seleucid-era setting. However, there are difficulties with this view: namely that Antiochus only ruled for eleven years, not at least eighteen like the king in the book. Like Cambyses, Antiochus also could not have fought the kings of Elam and Media, as those empires no longer existed. Antiochus also specifically targeted the Jewish people, not the entire western half of the empire like the king in this book. Furthermore, if the book was written during the time of Antiochus, it makes little sense why the consensus of ancient Jews and Christians was that the king was Cambyses II, as Antiochus lived almost 400 years after Cambyses. Certain late retellings of the Judith story, such as the Megillat Antiochus and the Chronicles of Jerahmeel, also identify "Holofernes" as Nicanor, son of Patroclus, the notorious general of the Seleucids under Antiochus. However, this identification has its own difficulties: Nicanor was not the head of Antiochus’s army and worked alongside the other generals Ptolemy the son of Dorymenes and Gorgias, according to 1 Maccabees. While it is true that Nicanor had been placed in command for the mission to destroy the Jewish Temple, the account in 1 Maccabees gives a great deal of focus to Gorgias in particular and describes him in command of several offensives. As second only to the king, Holofernes seems to be the Assyrian Turtanu, but the Seleucids had no such office. Also unlike Holofernes, who didn’t even know who the Jewish people were, Nicanor hated the Jews specifically. Nicanor, like Holofernes, was decapitated, but this was done after he was already dead, unlike Holofernes who was killed by his decapitation. Nonetheless, the view of a Maccabean-era composition of the book prevails as the dominant scholarly view of the modern era, with most scholars addressing these difficulties by arguing that the book is a heavily fictionalized romance with the king and general being a composite character loosely inspired by the reign of Antiochus.

=== Identification of Nebuchadnezzar with Artaxerxes III Ochus ===
Sulpicius Severus identified the king with Artaxerxes III Ochus (359–338 BCE), not on the basis of the character of the two rulers, but due to the presence of a "Holofernes" and a "Bagoas" in Ochus' army. Furthermore, the western military campaign described in Judith bears significantly more resemblance to Artaxerxes III’s reconquest of Egypt around 343 BCE than the Maccabean revolt under Antiochus. At that time, multiple western rulers in Phoenicia, Anatolia and Cyprus declared their independence from Persian rule and Artaxerxes deported some Jews who supported the revolt to Hyrcania, on the south coast of the Caspian Sea. This identification also gained some currency with scholarship in the late 19th and early 20th centuries. According to Antoine Augustin Calmet: "Sulpicius Severus wants it to have happened even later, that is to say, under the reign of Artaxerxes Ochus. This opinion is based principally on the violent and cruel nature of Ochus, and on the name of his eunuch Bagoas, who put him to death." This opinion can be found in Severus's Sacred History, Book Two: "Most persons, however, think that it was Cambyses, the son of Cyrus, on this ground that he, as a conqueror, penetrated into Egypt and Ethiopia. But the sacred history is opposed to this opinion; for Judith is described as having lived in the twelfth year of the king in question. Now, Cambyses did not possess the supreme power for more than eight years. Wherefore, if it is allowable to make a conjecture on a point of history, I should be inclined to believe that her exploits were performed under king Ochus, who came after the second Artaxerxes. ... If these things took place, as we believe, under king Ochus, in the twelfth year of his reign, then from the date of the restoration of Jerusalem up to that war there elapsed two and twenty years. Now Ochus reigned in all twenty-three years. And he was beyond all others cruel, and more than of a barbarous disposition." Unlike Cambyses, Artaxerxes's reign was long enough to fit the events of this book. However, Artaxerxes III's western campaign occurred in the sixteenth year of his reign, not the eighteenth like the Judith claims.

=== Identification of Nebuchadnezzar with Tigranes the Great ===
Modern scholars argue in favor of a 2nd–1st century context for the Book of Judith, understanding it as a sort of roman à clef—i.e., a literary fiction whose characters stand for some real historical figure, generally contemporary to the author. In the case of the Book of Judith, Biblical scholar Gabriele Boccaccini identified Nebuchadnezzar with Tigranes the Great (140–56 BCE), a powerful King of Armenia who, according to Josephus and Strabo, conquered all of the lands identified by the Biblical author in Judith. Under this theory, the story, although fictional, would be set in the time of Queen Salome Alexandra, the only Jewish regnant queen, who reigned over Judea from 76 to 67 BCE. Like Judith, the Queen had to face the menace of a foreign king who had a tendency to destroy the temples of other religions. Both women were widows whose strategical and diplomatic skills helped in the defeat of the invader.

== Place names specific to the Book of Judith ==
Whilst a number of the places referred to are familiar biblical or modern place names, there are others which are considered fictional or whose location is not otherwise known. Theologians Antoine Augustin Calmet, Wilhelm Gesenius and Franz Karl Movers all worked to explain bizarre geographical locations in the book as copyist or translation mistakes. For instance, Movers explained χαλλαίων ("challaion") as referring to χαλδαίων, or "Chaldean". A few more of these disputed locations include:

- 1:5 – the territory of Ragae, possible Rages or Rhages, cf. Tobit 1:16
- 1:6 – the rivers Euphrates and Tigris are mentioned, as well as the Hydaspes (Jadason in the Vulgate). Hydaspes is also the Greek name for the Jhelum River in modern India and Pakistan. However, Calmet identified this river as the Karkheh River, called the "Choaspes" by the Greeks. Calmet claims that the copyists confused the Choaspes with the Hydaspes, and claims that the historian Quintus Curtius Rufus made this exact mistake.
- 2:21 – the plain of Bectileth, three days' march from Nineveh. Calmet identified this as the "Bagadania plain" in Cappadocia that was described by Strabo as being "at the foot of the Taurus Mountains"
- 4:4 – Kona. Both Calmet and the Bibles of Complute believe that it simply refers to “villages”. Mark 8:27 says that they came to “the villages (κώμας, kômas) of Caesarea Philippi.” It is possible that among those villages were the Old Testament sites of Baal-gad and Baal-Hermon. This is also how Johannes Van Der Ploeg translated the passage from the Syriac Trivandrum manuscript.
- 4:4 – Belmain. The Syriac Peshitta writes the name of this location as Abel-meholah (as well as in 7:3), and this identification was further supported by Calmet. Some have speculated that, because the two verses spell the name differently, that it is a different location, possibly Belameh.
- 4:4 – Choba. Possibly the Hobah mentioned in Genesis 14:15. If it is to be identified with Muqeible, which was referred to as "Muqeibleh" in antiquity, a possible etymology for "Choba".
- 4:4 – Aesora. The Septuagint calls it Aisora, Arasousia, Aisoraa, or Assaron, depending on the manuscript. Possibly Tel Hazor or En-hazor, both of which are mentioned in the book of Joshua.
- 4:4 – The valley of Salem. It could be identified with "Shalem, a city of Shechem" mentioned in Genesis 33:18. This is the modern city of Salim, located about three miles east of Shechem, and is located at the foot of the Jordan Valley.
- 4:6 and several later references – Bethulia, a gated city (Judith 10:6). From the gates of the city, the valley below can be observed (Judith 10:10). Because of the geography described, it is theorized by many, including the Jewish Encyclopedia and Charles Cutler Torrey, to be a pseudonym for Shechem. This would explain why the city's name is derived from "Beth El", or "House of God": the Samaritans built their own schismatic Temple on Mount Gerizim.
- 4:6 – Betomesthaim or Betomasthem. Some translations refer to "the people of Bethulia and Betomesthaim" as a unit, which "faces (singular) Esdraelon opposite the plain near Dothan. The Encyclopædia Britannica refers to the "Plain of Esdraelon" as the plain between the Galilee hills and Samaria. As such, historian and archaeologist Charles Cutler Torrey identified Betomesthaim as a pseudonym for the city of Samaria. Torrey went further to identify the Hebrew basis for Betomesthaim as “Bayit Mizpah”, which means “house of outlook”. This is plausible, because "Samaria" is the Greek translation of the Hebrew name "Shomron", which means "watch" or "watchman".
- 4:6 – A plain near Dothan (Dothian in the Vulgate)
- 7:3 - Belbaim. The Syriac Peshitta writes the name of this location as Abel-meholah (as well as in 4:4), and this identification was further supported by Calmet.
- 7:3 – Cyalon or Cynamon, also facing Esdraelon. The Encyclopedia of the Bible notes that "some scholars have felt that this name is a corruption for Jokneam".
- 7:18 – Egrebeh, which is near Chubi, beside the Wadi Mochmur. Both Calmet and Charles William Meredith van de Velde identified Egrebeh with Akrabeh, a ruined site in the mountains of Central Palestine, eleven miles southeast of Shechem. Chubi has been identified with Quzah, a village located near Einabus, five and-a-half miles south of Shechem and five miles west of Agrabeh. The Wady Makfuriyeh is located on the northern slopes of which Akrabeh stands. The Wadi Mochmur as the Wady Makfuriyeh. This identification is supported by the Syriac, which translated the name of the river as "Nachol de-Peor".
- 8:4 – Balamon. The Septuagint states that Manasseh, Judith's husband, was buried in a field between Dothan and Balamon. This detail is not included in the Vulgate. Calmet speculated that "Balamon" was "the same city that they have already named several times, sometimes Belmaïm, and sometimes Belma, or Bélem, or Baalmeon". It is possible that "Balamon" is a different location that is to be identified with Baal-meon.
- 15:4 – Along with Betomesthaim, other places presumably in the vicinity of Bethulia are mentioned: Choba (or Chobai) and Kola. Choba is generally thought to be the "Choba" from 4:4, if that is the case it could be Muqeible. Kola could be identified with Golan, or possibly Cabul. The Ignatius Catholic Study Bible speculates that "Kola" could be Holon. In this verse, the Codex Alexandrinus also lists a place called Bebai, however this is not included in the Codex Vaticanus. Bebai could be identified with Hebron or Abel-Maim, an identification supported by the Syriac Trivandrum manuscript.

=== Location of Bethulia ===
Although there is no historically recorded "Bethulia", the book of Judith gives an extremely precise location for where the city is located, and there are several possible candidates of ancient towns in that area that are now ruins. It has widely been speculated that, based on location descriptions in the book, that the most plausible historical site for Bethulia is Shechem. Shechem is a large city in the hill-country of Samaria, on the direct road from Jezreel to Jerusalem, lying in the path of the enemy, at the head of an important pass and is a few hours south of Geba. The Jewish Encyclopedia subscribes to the theory, suggesting that it was called by a pseudonym because of the historical animosity between the Jews and Samaritans. The Jewish Encyclopedia claims that Shechem is the only location that meets all the requirements for Bethulia's location, further stating: "The identity of Bethulia with Shechem is thus beyond all question". Charles Cutler Torrey pointed out that the description of water being brought to the city by means of an aqueduct from a spring above the city on the south side is a trait that can only belong to Shechem.

The Catholic Encyclopedia writes: "The city was situated on a mountain overlooking the plain of Jezrael, or Esdrelon, and commanding narrow passes to the south (Judith 4:6–7; 6:11–13); at the foot of the mountain there was an important spring, and other springs were in the neighborhood (Judith 6:11; 7:3, 7, 12). Moreover, it lay within investing lines which ran through Dothain, or Dothan, now Tell Dothân, to Belthem, or Belma, no doubt the same as the Belamon of Judith 8:3, and thence to Kyamon, or Chelmon, "which lies over against Esdrelon" (Judith 7:3). These data point to a site on the heights west of Jenin (Engannim), between the plains of Esdrelon and Dothan, where Haraiq el-Mallah, Khirbet Sheikh Shibel and el-Bârid lie close together. Such a site best fulfills all requirements for the location of Bethulia.

The Madaba Map mosaic from the 6th century AD, shows a settlement named "Betylion" (Greek Β[ΗΤ]ΥΛΙΟΝ). Many believe this to be Bethulia, but this is unlikely because it is located much farther south. It instead is located on the Egyptian border with the Gaza Strip, in modern-day Sheikh Zuweid.

== Later artistic renditions ==
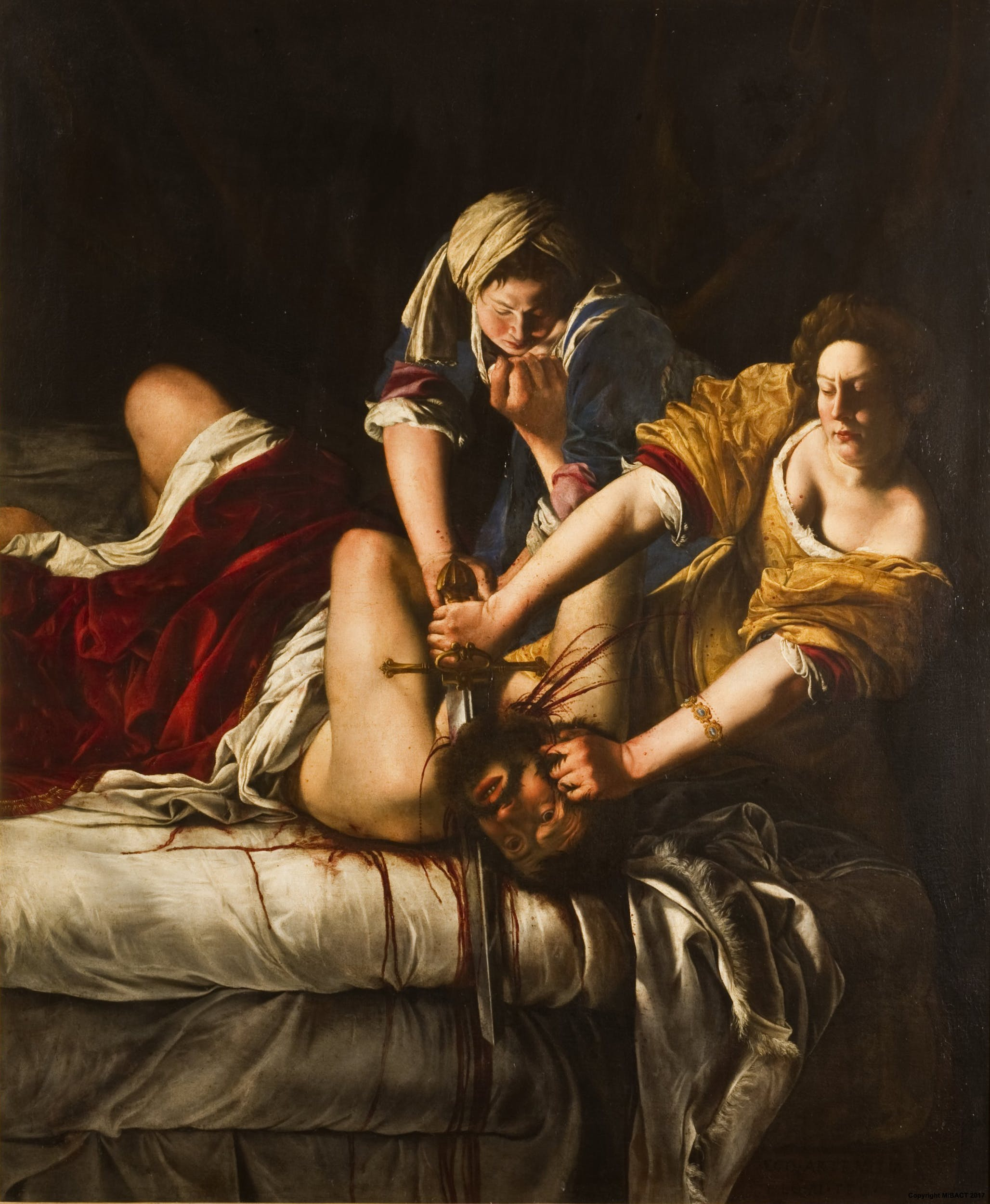
Judith Slaying Holofernes by Artemisia Gentileschi

The character of Judith is larger than life, and she has won a place in Jewish and Christian lore, art, poetry and drama. The etymology of her name meaning "woman of Judea", suggests that she represents the heroic spirit of the Jewish people, and that same spirit, as well as her chastity, have endeared her to Christianity.

Owing to her unwavering religious devotion, she is able to step outside of her widow's role, and dress and act in a sexually provocative manner while clearly remaining true to her ideals in the reader's mind, and her seduction and beheading of the wicked Holofernes while playing this role has been rich fodder for artists of various genres.

=== In literature ===
The first extant commentary on The Book of Judith is by Hrabanus Maurus (9th century). Thenceforth her presence in Medieval literature is robust: in homilies, biblical paraphrases, histories and poetry. An Old English poetic version is found together with Beowulf (their epics appear both in the Nowell Codex). "The opening of the poem is lost (scholars estimate that 100 lines were lost) but the remainder of the poem, as can be seen, the poet reshaped the biblical source and set the poem's narrative to an Anglo–Saxon audience."

At the same time she is the subject of a homily by the Anglo-Saxon abbot Ælfric. The two conceptual poles represented by these works will inform much of Judith's subsequent history.

In the epic, she is the brave warrior, forceful and active; in the homily she is an exemplar of pious chastity for cloistered nuns. In both cases, her narrative gained relevance from the Norse Viking invasions of the period. Within the next three centuries Judith would be treated by such major figures as Heinrich Frauenlob, Dante, and Geoffrey Chaucer.

In medieval Christian art, the predominance of church patronage assured that Judith's patristic valences as "Mulier Sancta" and Virgin Mary prototype would prevail: from the 8th-century frescoes in Santa Maria Antigua in Rome through innumerable later bible miniatures. Gothic cathedrals often featured Judith, most impressively in the series of 40 stained glass panels at the Sainte-Chapelle in Paris (1240s).

In Renaissance literature and visual arts, all of these trends were continued, often in updated forms, and developed. The already well established notion of Judith as an exemplum of the courage of local people against tyrannical rule from afar was given new urgency by the Assyrian nationality of Holofernes, which made him an inevitable symbol of the threatening Ottoman Turks. The Italian Renaissance poet Lucrezia Tornabuoni chose Judith as one of the five subjects of her poetry on biblical figures.

A similar dynamic was created in the 16th century by the confessional strife of the Reformation and Counter-Reformation. Both Protestants and Catholics draped themselves in the protective mantle of Judith and cast their "heretical" enemies as Holofernes.

In 16th-century France, writers such as Guillaume Du Bartas, Gabrielle de Coignard and Anne de Marquets composed poems on Judith's triumph over Holofernes. Croatian poet and humanist Marko Marulić also wrote an epic on Judith's story in 1501, the Judita. Italian poet and scholar Bartolomeo Tortoletti wrote a Latin epic on the Biblical character of Judith (Bartholomaei Tortoletti Iuditha uindex e uindicata, 1628). The Catholic tract A Treatise of Schisme, written in 1578 at Douai by the English Catholic scholar Gregory Martin, included a paragraph in which Martin expressed confidence that "the Catholic Hope would triumph, and pious Judith would slay Holofernes". This was interpreted by the English Protestant authorities at the time as incitement to slay Queen Elizabeth I. It served as the grounds for the death sentence passed on printer William Carter who had printed Martin's tract and who was executed in 1584.

=== In painting and sculpture ===
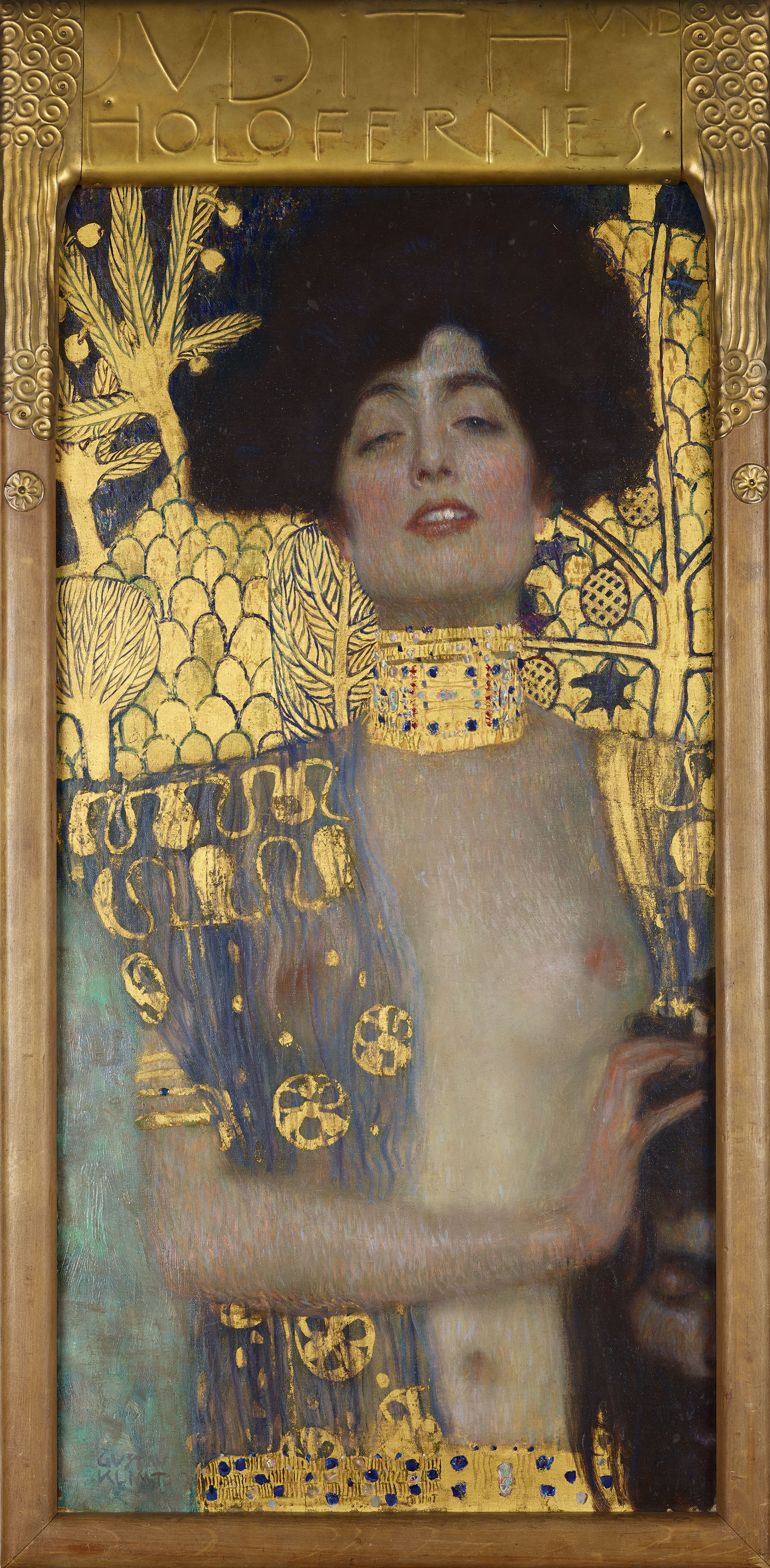
Klimt's explicit 1901 version of Judith I was shocking to viewers and is said to have targeted themes of female sexuality that had previously been more or less taboo.

The subject is one of the most commonly shown in the Power of Women topos. The account of Judith's beheading of Holofernes has been treated by several painters and sculptors, most notably Donatello and Caravaggio, as well as Sandro Botticelli, Andrea Mantegna, Giorgione, Lucas Cranach the Elder, Titian, Horace Vernet, Gustav Klimt, Artemisia Gentileschi, Jan Sanders van Hemessen, Trophime Bigot, Francisco Goya, Francesco Cairo and Hermann-Paul. Also, Michelangelo depicts the scene in multiple aspects in one of the Pendentives, or four spandrels on the ceiling of the Sistine Chapel. Judy Chicago included Judith with a place setting in The Dinner Party.

=== In music and theatre ===
The famous 40-voice motet Spem in alium, by English composer Thomas Tallis, is a setting of a text from the Book of Judith. The story also inspired oratorios by Antonio Vivaldi, W. A. Mozart and Hubert Parry, and an operetta by Jacob Pavlovitch Adler. Marc-Antoine Charpentier composed Judith sive Bethulia liberata H.391, oratorio for soloists, chorus, 2 flutes, strings, and continuo (? mid-1670s). Elisabeth Jacquet de La Guerre (EJG.30) and Sébastien de Brossard composed a cantata Judith.

Alessandro Scarlatti wrote an oratorio in 1693, La Giuditta, as did the Portuguese composer Francisco António de Almeida in 1726; Juditha triumphans was written in 1716 by Antonio Vivaldi; Mozart composed in 1771 La Betulia Liberata (KV 118), to a libretto by Pietro Metastasio. Arthur Honegger composed an oratorio, Judith, in 1925 to a libretto by René Morax. Operatic treatments exist by Russian composer Alexander Serov, Judith, by Austrian composer Emil von Reznicek, Holofernes, and Judith by German composer Siegfried Matthus. The French composer Jean Guillou wrote his Judith-Symphonie for Mezzo and Orchestra in 1970, premiered in Paris in 1972 and published by Schott-Music.

In 1840, Friedrich Hebbel's play Judith was performed in Berlin. He deliberately departs from the biblical text:

I have no use for the biblical Judith. There, Judith is a widow who lures Holofernes into her web with wiles, when she has his head in her bag she sings and jubilates with all of Israel for three months. That is mean, such a nature is not worthy of her success [...]. My Judith is paralyzed by her deed, frozen by the thought that she might give birth to Holofernes' son; she knows that she has passed her boundaries, that she has, at the very least, done the right thing for the wrong reasons.

The story of Judith has been a favourite of latter-day playwrights; it was brought alive in 1892 by Abraham Goldfaden, who worked in Eastern Europe. The American playwright Thomas Bailey Aldrich's Judith of Bethulia was first performed in New York, 1905, and was the basis for the 1914 production Judith of Bethulia by director D. W. Griffith. A full hour in length, it was one of the earliest feature films made in the United States. English writer Arnold Bennett in 1919 tried his hand at dramaturgy with Judith, a faithful reproduction in three acts; it premiered in spring 1919 at Devonshire Park Theatre, Eastbourne. In 1981, the play "Judith among the Lepers" by the Israeli (Hebrew) playwright Moshe Shamir was performed in Israel. Shamir examines the question why the story of Judith was excluded from the Jewish (Hebrew) Bible and thus banned from Jewish history. In putting her story on stage he tries to reintegrate Judith's story into Jewish history. English playwright Howard Barker examined the Judith story and its aftermath, first in the scene "The Unforeseen Consequences of a Patriotic Act", as part of his collection of vignettes, The Possibilities. Barker later expanded the scene into a short play Judith.

== Notes ==
Deuterocanon / Apocrypha
Preceded by Tobit	R.Catholic & Orthodox; Books of the Bible	Succeeded by Esther
