= Judith (poem) =

Old English narrative poem (c. 975–1025)

Judith is an Old English narrative poem describing the beheading of Assyrian general Holofernes by Israelite Judith of Bethulia. Found in the same manuscript as the heroic poem Beowulf, it is one of many retellings of the Holofernes–Judith tale as it was found in the Book of Judith, a story still present in the Catholic and Orthodox Christian bibles but considered apocryphal by Protestants. There is one other extant version in Old English; Ælfric of Eynsham, the late 10th-century Anglo-Saxon abbot and writer, wrote a homily (in prose) of the tale.

== History, manuscript ==
Judith is found in the Nowell Codex, dated ca. 975–1025. The poem is incomplete. How much is lost is a matter of contention. The poem is at the end of the codex, following Beowulf, and was written by Scribe B, one of two scribes responsible for Beowulf. Leonard Boyle proposes that Scribe B was working on Judith while Scribe A was working on Beowulf, and that B finished Beowulf afterward.

Some earlier scholars (such as Albert Spaulding Cook) proposed Cynewulf as the poem's author, but the absence of Cynewulf's typical runic signature has led many not to attribute authorship to him. Stylistically, the poem so strongly reflects the Cynewulfian school that Cook surmised it may just as likely been written by one of Cynewulf’s successors.

It is unknown when Judith became fragmented, but Robert D. Fulk (and others) argue Judith, and indeed the Nowell Codex, was already fragmented when Laurence Nowell signed the manuscript in the 1500s.

It is evident that the story of Judith has been modified and set within the framework of the Old English present. Much of the geographic and political structures relevant to a Hebrew culture have been removed or adapted, relevant to an Old English audience.

== Plot, structure and themes ==
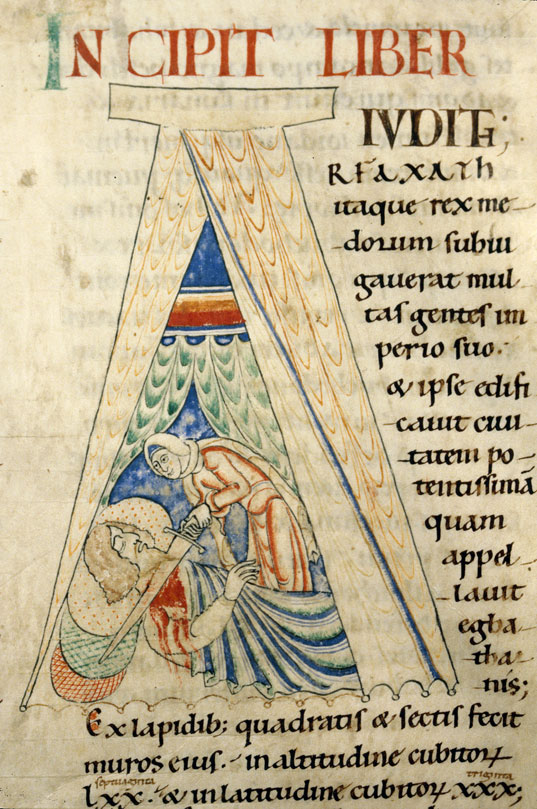
A medieval illustration of Judith and Holophernes

Like Beowulf, Judith conveys a moral tale of heroic triumph over monstrous beings, if we follow the supposition of Andy Orchard’s Pride and Prodigies: Studies in the Monsters of the Beowulf Manuscript. Both moral and political, the poem tells of a brave woman’s efforts to save and protect her people. Judith is depicted as an exemplary woman, grounded in faith and chastity--so the biblical text and Ælfric's homily tell us, because the extant Old English text starts in medias res. Her bravery and wisdom are mentioned: she is a halige meowle (line 56), "holy woman", and a snoteran idese (line 55), "wise woman", and her beauty is praised in line 13 when she is called aelfscinu (line 13), "elf-shining", sometimes rendered as "woman of elfin beauty". Although Judith kills a man, she appears to be doing God's will; Holofernes, while described to some extent as a standard military leader in the Beowulfian vein, is also cast as a salacious drunk and becomes monstrous in his excess.

Portraying the epitome of Germanic heroism, Judith was likely composed during a time of war as a model for the Anglo-Saxon people. The Abbot Ælfric similarly created his own homiletic interpretation of the Book of Judith. At the time of his creation, Vikings were ransacking England. Ælfric professed that Judith was to serve as an example to the people. In a letter, Ælfric wrote: þeo is eac on English on ure wisan iset eow mannum to bisne, þet ge eower eard mid wæpnum beweriæn wið onwinnende here, meaning "It is also set as an example for you in English according to our style, so that you will defend your land with weapons against an attacking force".

Ælfric’s Judith is quite like that of the poem; furthermore, the characters seem to have served the same purpose—to stand as an example to the people in a time of war. Judith's city of Bethulia was being plundered by Assyrians. Holofernes was an Assyrian general and king, often drunk and constantly monstrous.

The Vulgate Liber Iudith, the posited source text of these works, has been mutilated in order to contain the Anglo-Saxon heroic mode:

“Perhaps the most striking difference between the Old English Judith and the Vulgate version is the setting of the story. In the Vulgate version of the story, Judith’s people, the citizens of Bethulia in particular and the Israelites in general, are shown as more religious than martial, led by priests and elders, rather than kings and generals. The Old English poet deliberately chose to place Judith in a more military setting. Thus, the seeming paradox of a woman as the military leader of her people is not just the result of a difficulty in adapting a biblical story to a Germanic heroic idiom.”

There are also key narrative details: the Old English Judith, after severing the head of Holofernes, proudly displayed his head to her Hebrew army and led them into a victorious battle against the Assyrians. In contrast, in the Book of Judith, the Assyrians simply fled Bethulia after discovering the deceased body of Holofernes.

== Poetic techniques ==
Judith contains many of the poetic techniques common to Old English poetry, including alliteration. The poem used the same kind of variation as do other Old English poems.

== Destruction and preservation ==
The only existing copy of the poem is in the Beowulf manuscript, immediately following Beowulf. Damage to the manuscript was caused by the Cotton fire of 1731 and readings have been lost. In order to account for these lost words, modern editions of the poem are supplemented by references to Edward Thwaites' 1698 edition.

== Palaeography ==
=== Orthography ===
In the Nowell Codex, the lack of scribal regularization is of note. The absence of -io spellings in Judith is of interest, in contrast to the ‘126’ <io> spellings in Beowulf, (totalling the pages transcribed by both A and B.)

As Peter Lucas has demonstrated, Scribe A, who copied the first 87 MS pages of Beowulf, made sure to use regularised <eo> spellings in ‘The Letter of Alexander the Great to Aristotle’, (66 instances,) and 'The Marvels of the East,’ (2 instances).

Conversely, The Life of St Christopher does not contain any <io> spellings, which leads to Lucas’ claim, that it is “extremely probable that Quire 14, containing Judith, is the nearest surviving part of the manuscript to its lost beginning, and that the quire was linked to the present Quire by just one quire, designated *0, at least part of which was discarded only as relatively recently as c. 1600.”

== See also ==
- Judith (homily)
