= Cambridge, Corpus Christi College, MS 303 =

12th-century English manuscript

Cambridge, Corpus Christi College, MS 303 (CCCC 303) is a twelfth-century English manuscript in the Parker Library of Corpus Christi College, Cambridge. The codex consists mostly of homilies, most of which derive from Ælfric of Eynsham's Catholic Homilies. The manuscript is especially notable since it contains part of Ælfric's Judith.

== Contents ==
Texts by Ælfric:

- Catholic Homilies (CH) I.33, pp. 279–83
- CH I.35, pp. 283–90
- Lives of the Saints XVI, pp. 290–96
- De duodecim abusiuis, 296-301
- De doctrina apostolica (Pope XIX), pp. 301–6
- De falsis diis (Pope XX.1-140, 150-2969, 299-301, 304-514, 565-676), pp. 306–17
- Interrogationes Sigewulfi, pp. 317–27
- Lives of the Saints XII, pp. 327–33
- Lives of the Saints XIII, pp. 333–38
- Judith (Assman IX.1-393), pp. 356–62
