= Betomasthem =

Unidentified town mentioned in the Book of Judith

Betomasthem (Greek: Βαıτομασθαίμ, Baitomasthaim) or Betomestham (Βετομεσθαίμ, Betomesthaim) is an unidentified town from the Book of Judith. Betomasthem is the most important location in the Book of Judith (aside from Bethulia) and it is generally assumed to have been a sizeable city, possibly of equal importance with Bethulia in their region.

== Location ==
Betomasthem is described in the Book of Judith as a town "over against Esdraelon, facing the plain that is near Dothaim", and in the vicinity of "Bebai, Chobai, and Cola, in the coasts of Israel". The Encyclopædia Britannica refers to the "Plain of Esdraelon" as the plain between the Galilee hills and Samaria. As such, historian and archaeologist Charles Cutler Torrey identified Betomasthem as a pseudonym for the city of Samaria. Torrey went further to identify the Hebrew basis for Betomasthem as “Bayit Mizpah”, which means “house of outlook”. This is plausible, because "Samaria" is the Greek translation of the Hebrew name "Shomron", which means "watch" or "watchman".

Others have proposed different identifications. It can hardly be Deir Massīn, which lies west of "the plain that is near Dothan". The district is clearly indicated, but no identification has been possible. Adam Zertal and Nivi Mirkam have suggested the site of el-Baṭn, located between the Jezreel and Dothan Valleys, as a possible candidate for Betomasthem. Theologian Antoine Augustin Calmet wrote in his commentary on the book of Judith, the "Commentaire littéral sur tous les livres de l'ancien et du nouveau testament: "Béthomesthaim is Betsamés, or, according to the Syriac pronunciation, Bétomesta". This identification identifies Betomasthem as Beth Shemesh. However, this is much too south to be anywhere near the Jezreel valley.

== Sources ==
- Book of Judith.

Attribution:

- Zertal, Adam; Mirkam, Nivi (2016). The Manasseh Hill Country Survey: Volume 3: From Nahal ‘Iron to Nahal Shechem. BRILL. pp. 74–75. ISBN 978-90-04-31230-2.
