= Fulcran Vigouroux =

French Catholic priest and scholar (1837–1915)

Fulcran Grégoire Vigouroux (13 February 1837 – 21 February 1915), was a French Catholic priest and scholar, biblical theologian, apologist, and the first secretary of the Pontificial Commission (1903–1912). Vigouroux defended the historicity of the Bible.

== Life and work ==
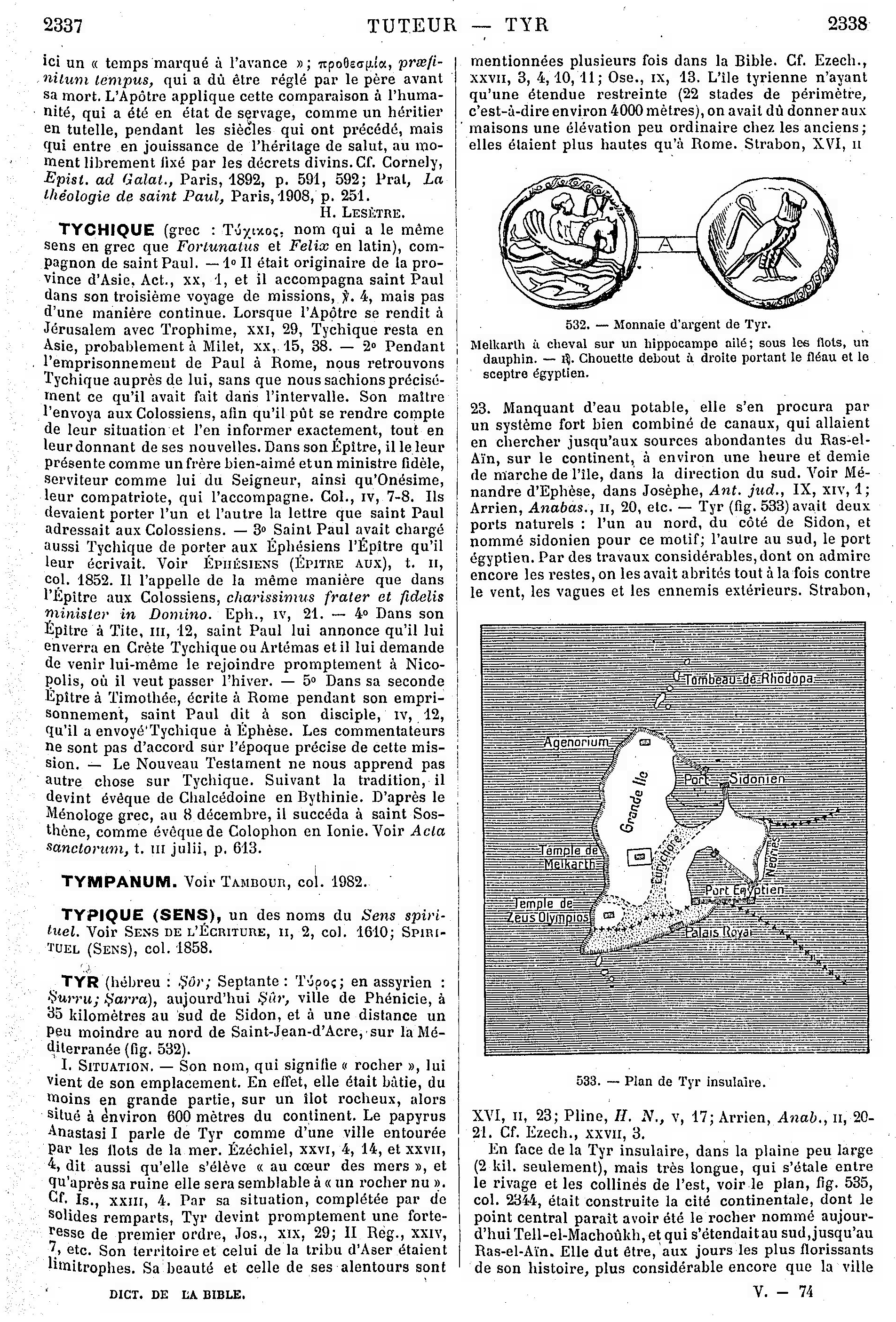
Page from the Dictionnaire de la Bible

Vigouroux was born at Nantes. He finished his education in October 1853. He was ordained on December 21, 1861. After ordination he became a member of the Society of Saint-Sulpice. Between 1862 and 1864 Vigouroux taught as a professor of philosophy, first at the seminary of Autun and then, from October, 1864 to 1868, at the seminary of Issy. In 1890 he replaced Abbot Paul Martin at the Institut Catholique de Paris as an instructor on the Bible, particularly the Old Testament. Vigouroux engaged in defending the historicity of the Bible. Chiefly concerned with apologetical questions, Vigouroux tended to be conservative in exegesis.

In 1903 Vigouroux was called to Rome to become the first secretary of the newly formed Pontifical Biblical Commission. Vigouroux engaged in foundational work of Pontificio Istituto Biblico. He died in Paris.

He is the author of a Manuel Biblique (1880). His work La Bible et les découvertes modernes en Égypte et en Assyrie passed through six editions between 1877 and 1896. According to this work, modern archaeological discoveries in Egypt and Assyria supported the reliability of the Bible. Vigouroux also edited the apologetically oriented Dictionnaire de la Bible (Dictionary of the Bible), in five volumes (1891–1912). His works have apologetical character. Vigouroux was one of the polemicists of Ernest Renan.

Vigouroux was considered one of the major Catholic apologists in his time. According to his opponents and polemicists he "was as dull in his style as in his misdeeds".

== Works ==
- De l'exégèse rationaliste en Allemagne. In: Études religieuses XXV (1870/71), 188–221.691–734
- La Bible et la critique, réponse aux ″Souvenirs d'enfance et de jeunesse″ de M. Renan, Paris : Berche et Tralin, 1883
- La Bible et les découvertes modernes en Égypte et en Assyrie, Paris : Berche et Tralin, 1877
- Manuel biblique, ou Cours d'Écriture sainte à l'usage des séminaires. Ancien Testament, Paris : A. Roger et F. Chernoviz, 1878
- La Bible et les découvertes modernes en Palestine, en Égypte, et en Assyrie, Paris : Berche et Tralin, 1879 (Plusieurs éditions augmentées par la suite)
- Dictionnaire de la Bible, contenant tous les noms de personnes, de lieux, de plantes, d'animaux mentionnés dans les Saintes Écritures, les questions théologiques, archéologiques, scientifiques, critiques, relatives à l'Ancien et au Nouveau Testament, Paris : Letouzey et Ané, 1895–1912 (avec de nombreux collaborateurs) Sur Gallica 2
- Les Livres saints et la critique rationaliste, histoire et réfutation des objections des incrédules contre les saintes Écritures, Paris : A. Roger et F. Chernoviz, 1890–1891 (Plusieurs éditions ensuite)
- La Bible et les découvertes modernes. 6th ed. 4 vols- Paris, 1896.
- La Sainte Bible Polyglotte contenant le texte hébreu original, le texte grec des Septante, le texte latin de la Vulgate, et la traduction française de M. l'Abbé Glaire, 1900–1909, 8 volumes.

== See also ==
- Jean-Baptiste Glaire – his Bible translation was included in the 'Glaire & Vigouroux' Bible.
