= Franz Karl Movers =

German Roman Catholic divine and Orientalist

- Born: July 17, 1806; Koesfeld
- Died: September 28, 1856 (aged 50); Breslau (now Wrocław)

Academic background
- Education: University of Münster

Academic work
- Discipline: Oriental studies
- Institutions: University of Breslau

Franz Karl Movers (July 17, 1806 – September 28, 1856), German Roman Catholic divine and Orientalist.

== Life ==
Movers was born at Koesfeld in Westphalia. He studied theology and Oriental languages at the University of Münster, was parish priest at Berkum near Bonn from 1833 to 1839, and professor of Old Testament theology in the Catholic faculty of the University of Breslau from 1839 to his death.

His elaborate works, Die Phönizier (1841–1850) and Phönizische Texte, erklärt (1845–1847), attained a high reputation. Of his other writings two biblical studies were of some importance, his Kritische Untersuchungen caber die alttestamentliche Chronik (1834), and his Latin essay on the two recensions of the text of Jeremiah, De utriusque recensionis vaticiniorum Jeremiae ... indole et origine (1837)
