= Jean-Baptiste Glaire =

French Catholic priest, Hebraist, and Biblical scholar

Jean-Baptiste Glaire (1 April 1798 – 25 February 1879) was a French Catholic priest, Hebraist, and Biblical scholar.

== Biography ==
Glaire was born at Bordeaux. Having completed a course of serious study at Bordeaux, he went to the seminary of Saint-Sulpice at Paris, the courses of which he followed simultaneously with those of Semitic languages at the Sorbonne. After his ordination to priesthood, in 1822, he began to teach Hebrew at the seminary of Saint-Sulpice.

In 1825 Glaire was made assistant to the Abbé Chaunac de Lanzac, professor of Hebrew at the Sorbonne, and succeeded him as lecturer in 1831. He was professor of Sacred Scripture in 1836, became dean of the faculty in 1841, and retired in 1851. He died at Issy, near Paris.

== Works ==
His numerous works are out of print, and largely obsolete.

The following are his chief publications.

=== On semitic languages ===
- Lexicon manuale hebraicum et chaldaicum, Paris, 1830 (correction of the Lexicon of Gesenius)
- Principes de grammaire hébraïque et chaldaïque, Paris, 1832 and 1843
- Manuel de l'hébraïsant, Paris, 1850
- Principes de grammaire arabe, Paris, 1861

=== On the Bible ===
- Introduction historique et critique aux livres de l'Ancien et du Nouveau Testament, Paris, 1836, several times re-edited; he summarized it in his Abrégé d'introduction etc., Paris, 1846, which also went through several editions
- Les Livres saints vengés, ou la vérité historique et divine de l'Ancien et du Nouveau Testament, Paris, 1845. The portion of his work which endures consists of his translations of the Bible
- La sainte Bible en latin et en français, Paris, 1834
- Torah Mosché, le Pentateuque, Hebrew text with translation and annotations
- La sainte Bible selon la Vulgate, Paris, 1871-1873, an exact but too literal version; the translation of the New Testament, also frequently published separately, was specially examined and approved at Rome. Glaire's translation was inserted in the Bible polyglotte of Fulcran Vigouroux, Paris, 1889-1890.
- With Viscount Walsh, Glaire edited the Encyclopédie catholique (Paris, 1854—), to which he contributed a number of articles.
