= Bethulia =

City in the Book of Judith

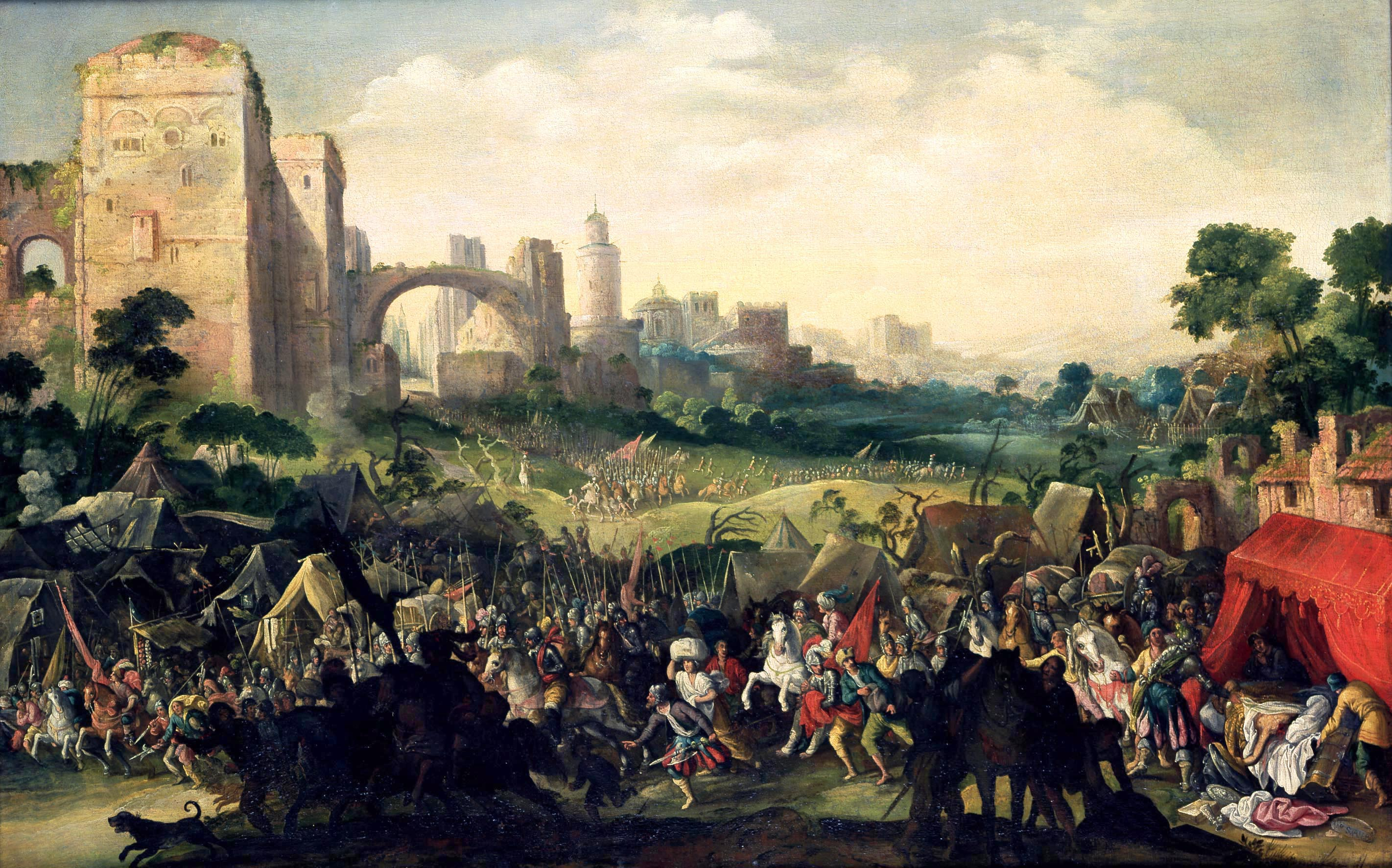
The Siege of Bethulia by Jacob van Swanenburg, c. 1615

Bethulia (Greek: Βαιτυλούᾳ, Baituloua; Hebrew: בתוליה) is a biblical "city whose deliverance by Judith, when besieged by Holofernes, forms the subject of the Book of Judith."

== Etymology ==
The name "Bethulia" in Hebrew can be associated, in an allegorical sense, with "Beth-el" (house of God). If treated as a real geographical name, it can be explained as a composite word built from "betulah", virgin, and "Jah", the proper name of God, so literally "YHWH's virgin". This suits the portrayal of Judith as a chaste widow and the book's emphasis on following religious rules, chastity among them.

Hugo Willrich suggested in 1900 in his book Judaica that "Bethulia" is a corrupted form of "Bethalagan".

== Location ==
It has widely been speculated that, based on location descriptions in the book, that the most plausible historical site for Bethulia is Shechem. Shechem was a large city in the hill-country of Samaria, on the direct road from Jezreel to Jerusalem, lying in the path of the enemy, at the head of an important pass and is a few hours south of Geba. Both Charles Cutler Torrey and The Jewish Encyclopedia subscribe to this theory. The Jewish Encyclopedia mentions that no place-name easily derivable from Bethulia could be identified in the region described, and speculates that the names were changed because of the historical animosity between the Jews and Samaritans. This would explain why the city's name is derived from "House of God": the Samaritans built their own schismatic Temple on Mount Gerizim. Furthermore, the Jewish Encyclopedia claims that Shechem is the only location that meets all the requirements for Bethulia's location, further stating: "The identity of Bethulia with Shechem is thus beyond all question". Torrey pointed out that the description of water being brought to the city by means of an aqueduct from a spring above the city on the south side is a trait that can only belong to Shechem.

The Catholic Encyclopedia (1907–14) writes: "The view that Bethulia is merely a symbolic name for Jerusalem or a fictitious town, has met with little favor, even among those who deny the historical character of the book. Bethulia is clearly distinguished from Jerusalem (Judith 4:6; 11:14, 19; 15:5, 8; the references throughout the article being to the fuller Greek text), and the topographical details" show that "the story, even if it be only a pious romance, is connected with a definite place. Its site, however, is in dispute. Beside Sanur, Mithilîyeh or Misilîyeh, Tell Kheibar and Beit-Ilfa, which have divided opinion for some time, Haraiq el-Mallah, Khirbet Sheikh Shibel, el-Bârid and Sichem (Bethulia being considered a pseudonym) have [as of the beginning of the 20th century] recently been proposed as sites of Bethulia." However, The Jewish Encyclopedia (1901–1906) considers "fort Sânûr", Guérin's choice for Bethulia, to be too far south, which applies to a smaller degree also to Mithilîyeh (Misilyah), the only candidate with a name even slightly similar to that of the biblical town. The Catholic Encyclopedia further writes: "The city was situated on a mountain overlooking the plain of Jezrael, or Esdrelon, and commanding narrow passes to the south (Judith 4:6-7; 6:11-13); at the foot of the mountain there was an important spring, and other springs were in the neighborhood (Judith 6:11; 7:3, 7, 12). Moreover it lay within investing lines which ran through Dothain, or Dothan, now Tell Dothân, to Belthem, or Belma, no doubt the same as the Belamon of Judith 8:3, and thence to Kyamon, or Chelmon, "which lies over against Esdrelon" (Judith 7:3). These data point to a site on the heights west of Jenin (Engannim), between the plains of Esdrelon and Dothan, where Haraiq, Kh. Sheikh Shibel, and el-Bârid lie close together. Such a site best fulfills all requirements. It lies between lines drawn from Tell Dothân to Belʽema, probably Belma, or Belamon, and from the latter to el-Yâmûn, probably Kyamon; there are a number of springs and wells in the neighborhood, and nearby are the two passes of Kefr Adân and Burqîn, so narrow in places that two horsemen cannot ride abreast. One of the three above-named places is in all probability the site of ancient Bethulia. The other sites are all deficient in some essential requirement." The Jewish Encyclopedia also finds el-Bârid, a place west of Jenin, as a quite plausible candidate on topographical grounds.

Adam Zertal and Nivi Mirkam have suggested the site of el-Kharaiyyeq, located on the ridge overlooking the Valleys of Dothan and Jezreel, as a possible candidate for Bethulia, writing: "The siege description fits el-Kharaiyyeq: the camp was in the Dothan Valley, with Bethuliya in the north-west, Dothan and Ibleam in the south-east, Bethuliya in the south, and Cyamon (an unknown place, possibly in the vicinity of Ta'anach) in the north, facing Jezreel."

== Madaba Map ==
Reproduction of the Madaba Map

The Madaba Map mosaic from the 6th century shows a settlement named Betylium (Ancient Greek: Β[ΗΤ]ΥΛΙΟΝ, Bētylion) on the Mediterranean coast southwest of Rafah on the Egyptian border with Gaza. The site is tentatively identified with modern Sheikh Zuweid. A late tract on the Holy Land, De Situ Terrae Sanctae ascribed to Archdeacon Theodosius, identified this as the biblical site, despite its incompatibility with the description in The Book of Judith: "From Rafia to Betulia, where Holofernes died, 12 miles."

== See also ==
- Betomasthem
- Judith of Bethulia
