= Holofernes =

Figure in the deuterocanonical Book of Judith

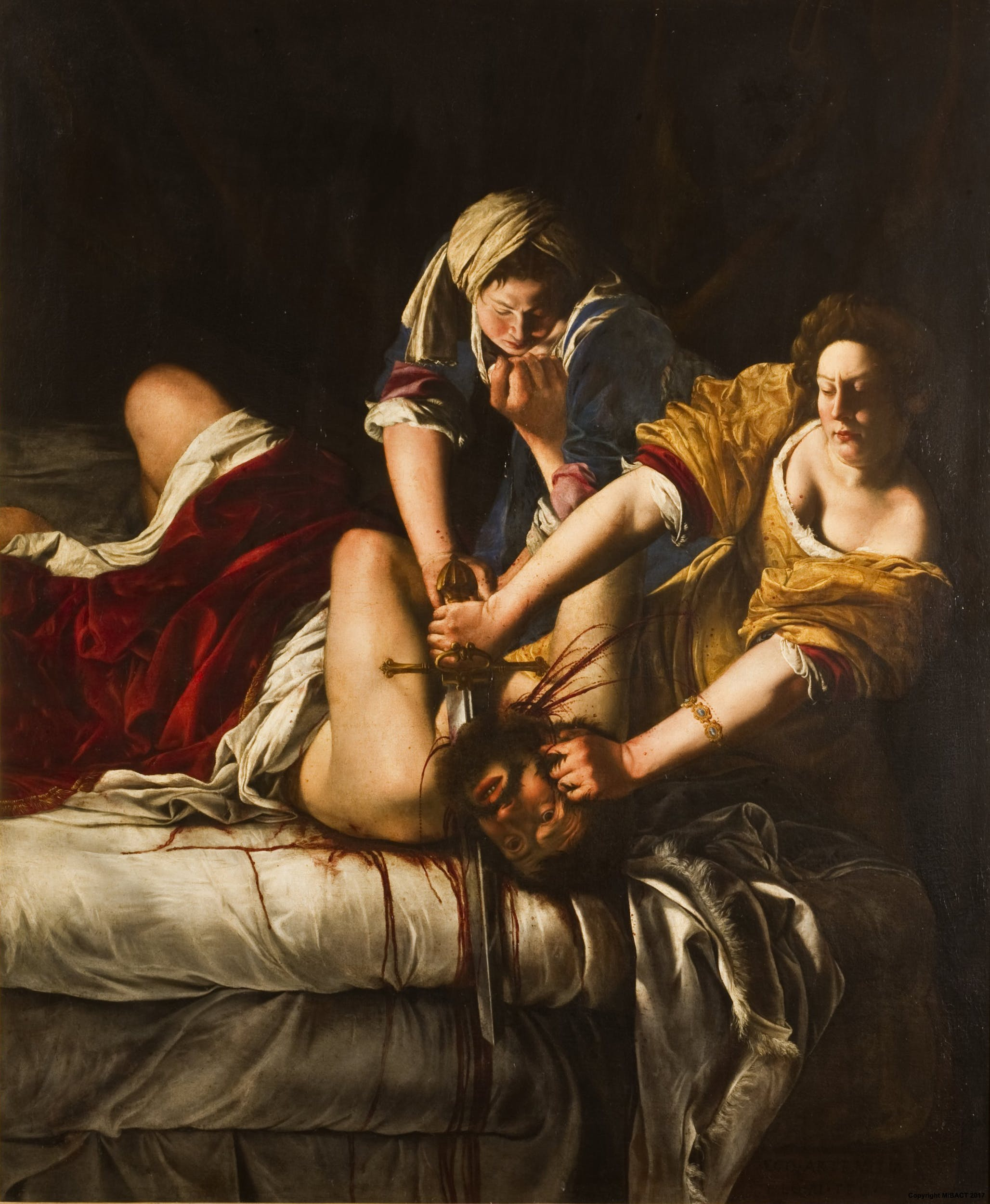
Artemisia Gentileschi's painting Judith Slaying Holofernes, 1614–1620

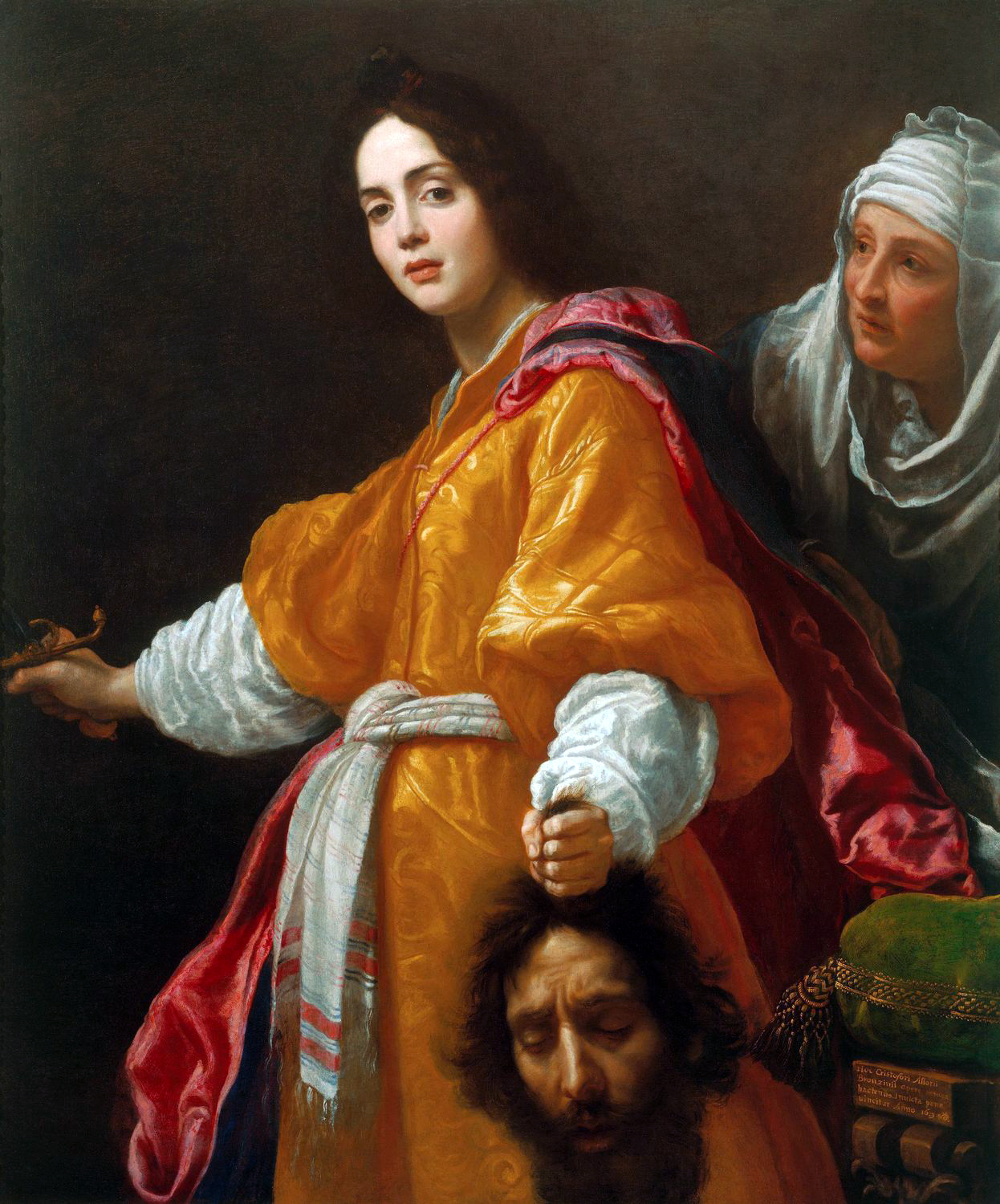
Judith with the Head of Holofernes by Cristofano Allori, 1613

Holofernes (Ancient Greek: Ὀλοφέρνης; Hebrew: הולופרנס) was an invading Assyrian general in the Book of Judith. He was beheaded by Judith, who entered his camp and decapitated him while he was intoxicated.

== Etymology ==
The name 'Holofernes' is derived from the Old Persian name *Varufarnāh, meaning "with wide-reaching glory", and is composed of the terms *varuš, meaning "wide", and farnāh, meaning "glory" (c.f. the farnah).

== Apocryphal (or Deuterocanonical) account ==
According to the Book of Judith, Holofernes had been dispatched by "Nebuchadnezzar" to take vengeance on the Kingdom of Judah, which had withheld assistance in his most recent war. Having occupied every land along the coastline, Holofernes outlawed the worship of any god other than Nebuchadnezzar. Despite being warned against attacking by Achior, the leader of the Ammonites, Holofernes laid siege to the city of Bethulia. The city almost fell to the invading army because Holofernes' advance stopped the water supply to Bethulia, which led to its people encouraging their rulers to capitulate. The leaders vowed to surrender if no help arrived within five days. Bethulia was saved by Judith, a Judean widow, who entered the camp of Holofernes, seduced him, and got him drunk before beheading him. She returned to Bethulia with the severed head. The assassination of Holofernes led to the defeat of his army.

== Identification ==
The Catholic Church has traditionally maintained the historicity of the Book of Judith, setting it to the reign of Manasseh of Judah. As a result, this Holofernes would be the turtanu of Ashurbanipal's armies. Catholic apologist Jimmy Akin has speculated that the book of Judith could be a roman à clef, a historical record with different names for people and places, which would explain the different names.

There are historical references to a "Holofernes" in the army of the Achaemenid emperor Artaxerxes III, which has led some to speculate that this is the Holofernes described in this book. However, this idea is generally rejected as implausible.

Because the Hebrew manuscripts from the Middle Ages refer to the Maccabean Revolt, Hebrew versions of the tale in the Megillat Antiochus and the Chronicles of Jerahmeel identify "Holofernes" as Nicanor; the Greek version used "Holofernes" as deliberately cryptic substitute, similarly using "Nebuchadnezzar" for Antiochus.

== In popular culture ==
Holofernes is depicted in Geoffrey Chaucer's The Monk's Tale in The Canterbury Tales, and in Dante's Purgatorio, in which Holofernes is to be found on the Terrace of Pride as an example of "pride cast down", XII.58–60. As a painter's subject he offers the chance to contrast the flesh and jewels of a beautiful, festively attired woman with the grisly head of the victim, a deuterocanonical parallel to the Yael sequence in the Hebrew Bible, as well as the New Testament vignette of Salome with the head of John the Baptist.

There is a Schoolmaster, one Holofernes, mentioned in William Shakespeare's play Love's Labour's Lost

There is a mention to Holofernes in the song "That Unwanted Animal" by The Amazing Devil.

German pop rock band Wir sind Helden's singer Judith Holfelder-Roy chose the stage name Judith Holofernes in reference to both Holofernes and his assassin.

Welsh Death Metal band Venom Prison's 2020 album Primeval features a song titled "Slayer of Holofernes".

== See also ==
- Sisera
