= Jude (given name) =

Unisex given name

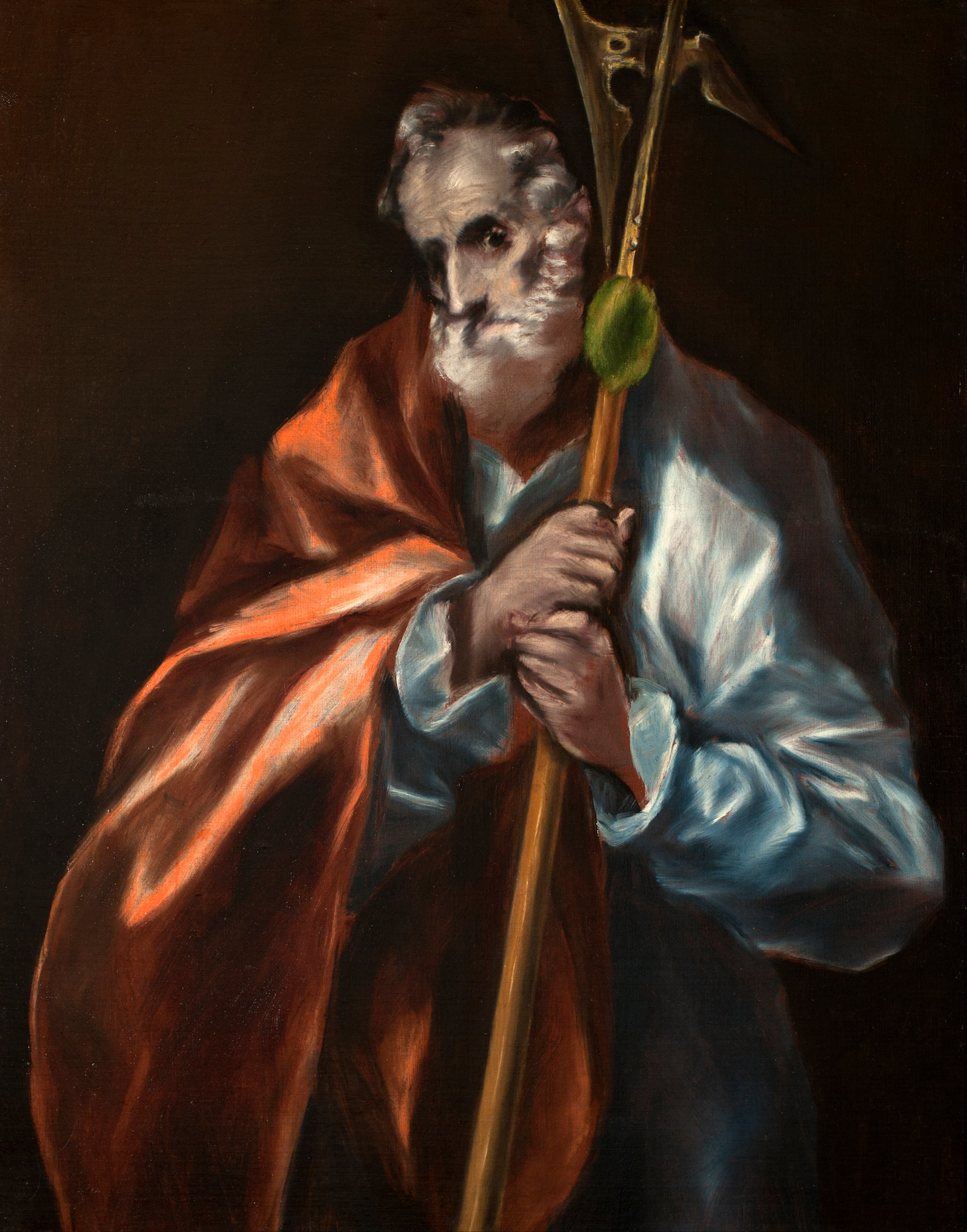
- St. Jude Thaddeus by El Greco
- Gender: Unisex, primarily masculine
- Language: Hebrew

Origin
- Meaning: "Praise"

Other names
- Related names: Judah, Judas, Judith, Judy, Yehuda

Jude is an English unisex, primarily masculine given name. It is ultimately derived from the Hebrew name יְהוּדָה, which can be transliterated as Yehuḏa, means "praise", and whose short form was more directly adopted into English as Judah. Jude is an English variant of Judas, a name derived from Ἰούδας (Ioudas), the Ancient Greek form of יְהוּדָה.

Variants of the name Jude are used for several Biblical figures. Jude the Apostle is a Roman Catholic patron saint of hopeless cases. It is also occasionally used as a feminine short form of the names Judith or Judy or as an independent feminine given name.

== Biblical figures with the name ==
- Jude, brother of Jesus, who is sometimes identified as being the same person as Jude the Apostle
- Jude the Apostle, an apostle also called Judas Thaddaeus or Lebbaeus, the patron saint of lost causes in the Catholic Church

== Men with the name ==
- Jude (singer) (born 1969), American singer-songwriter
- Jude (born 2000), better known as F1NN5TER, video game streamer
- Jude Abaga (born 1981), Nigerian hip hop artist
- Jude Abbott (born 1962), English musician
- Jude Acers (born 1944), American chess master
- Jude Acidre (born 1982), Filipino legislator and policy analyst
- Jude Adjei-Barimah (born 1992), Italian-American football cornerback
- Jude Akuwudike (born 1965), Nigerian actor
- Jude Aneke (born 1990), Nigerian forward
- Jude Angelini (born 1977), American radio host and author known as Rude Jude
- Jude Anthany Joseph, Indian film director, screenwriter and actor
- Jude Arthur (born 1999), Ghanaian footballer
- Jude Arthurs (born 2001), English professional footballer
- Jude Attipetty (born 1959), Indian director of Malayalam cinema and television
- Jude Bargwanna (born 2004), Australian motorsports racing driver
- Jude Bellingham (born 2003), English footballer
- Jude Blanchette, American foreign policy analyst and China specialist
- Frank Jude Boccio (born 1956), American Buddhist teacher
- Jude Bolton (born 1980), Australian rules footballer
- Jude Bowry (born 2003), American football player
- Jude Célestin (born 1962), Haitian politician
- Jude Ciccolella (born 1947), American actor and singer
- Jude Cole (born 1960), American singer, songwriter, record producer, and talent manager
- Jude Collins (born 2005), English professional footballer
- Jude Cook, British novelist
- James Jude Courtney (born 1957), American actor, stunt double, and stunt performer
- Jude Davies (born 1965), British academic
- Jude Thomas Dawam (born 1979), Nigerian radio personality, actor and musician
- Jude Deveraux (born 1947), American novelist
- Jude Dibia (born 1975), Nigerian novelist
- Chukwuemeka Jude Diji (born 1966), Nigerian academic
- Jude Patrick Dougherty (1930-2021), American philosopher
- Jude Drouin (born 1948), Canadian former professional ice hockey forward
- Sir Jude Ejiogu, Nigerian politician
- Jude Estrada (born 1977), Filipino Air Force reserve colonel and former actor
- Emeka Jude Ezeonu (born 1991), Nigerian international football player
- Jude Lal Fernando, academic based in Ireland
- Jude Gallagher (born 2001), Irish boxer
- Jude Garcia (born 1998), Filipino beach and indoor volleyball player
- Jude Gibbs (born 2001), Australian rugby union player
- Jude Gitamondoc (born 1979), Filipino songwriter, record producer, musical director, and stage director
- Jude Gold, American guitarist
- Jude Griebel (born 1978), Canadian sculptor
- Jude Hall, African-American soldier in the American Revolutionary War
- Jude Hill (born 2010), Northern Irish actor
- Jude Hofschneider (born 1970), Northern Marianan politician
- Jude Idada, Nigerian actor, poet, playwright and producer
- Jude Ise-Idehen (1969-2022), Nigerian politician
- Jude Kongnyuy (born 1988), Cameroonian footballer
- Jude Laspa (1943-2023), American vice president and director of the Bechtel Group
- Jude Law (born 1972), English actor
- Jude McAtamney (born 2000), Irish-American football player
- Jude Menezes (born 1971), Indian field hockey coach and former goalkeeper
- Jude Kenan Mohammad (1988-2011), American suspected terrorist
- Jude Monye (born 1973), Nigerian sprinter
- Jude Nancy (born 1984), Seychelles footballer
- Jude Njoku, Nigerian academic
- Jude Ngaji, Nigerian politician
- Ryan Jude Novelline, Italian–American contemporary artist and clothing designer
- Jude Nworuh (born 1989), Nigerian professional footballer
- Jude Ogada (born 1989), Nigerian footballer
- Jude Uzoma Ohaeri, Nigerian psychiatrist
- John Jude Palencar (born 1957), American illustrator and fine artist
- Jude Pate (born 1964 or 1965), American lawyer and judge
- Jude Perera (1953-2024), Australian politician
- Jude Postlethwaite (born 2002), Irish rugby union player
- Jude Rabo (born 1961), Nigerian academic
- Jude Reyes (born 1955), American billionaire businessman
- Jude Thaddaeus Ruwa'ichi (born 1954), Tanzanian Catholic Archbishop
- R. Jude Samulski (born 1954), American geneticist and inventor
- Jude Felix Sebastian (born 1965), Indian field hockey player and Olympian
- Jude Shao (born 1963), American entrepreneur
- Trevor Jude Smith, American ukulele player
- Jude Soonsup-Bell (born 2004), Thai professional footballer
- Jude Speyrer (1929-2013), American Roman Catholic bishop
- Jude Soonsup-Bell (born 10 January 2004), English and Thai professional footballer
- Jude Ssemugabi, Ugandan footballer
- Jude Stéfan (1930-2020), French poet and novelist
- Jude Stirling (born 1982), English former footballer
- Jude St. John (born 1972), Canadian former footballer
- Jude Sunday (born 2004), Nigerian football player
- Jude Thomas (runner) (born 2002), Australian middle-distance runner
- Jude Vandelannoite (born 1973), Belgian footballer
- Jude Willans (born 2010), Professional footballer for Tottenham Hotspur
- Jude Wanniski (1936-2005), American journalist, conservative commentator, and political economist
- Jude Wellings (born 2006), American professional soccer player
- Jude Winchester (born 1993), Northern Irish semi-professional footballer
- Jude Wright (born 1999), English actor
- Jude Wijethunge (died 1996), Sri Lankan Sinhala naval officer

== Women with the name ==
- Jude Bijou (born 1946), American psychotherapist, lecturer, and author
- Jude Broughan (born 1976), New Zealand artist
- Jude Broughton (born 1963), New Zealand former rugby union and touch football player
- Jude Burkhauser (1947-1998), American artist, museum curator and researcher
- Jude Coleman (born 1981), Australian former cricketer and current cricket coach
- Jude Cowan Montague, British artist, writer, composer, film historian, poet and broadcaster
- Jude Demorest (born 1992), American actress and singer
- Jude Deveraux (born 1947), American novelist
- Jude Dobson (born 1966 or 1967), New Zealand TV presenter, producer and author
- Jude Flannery (c. 1940-1997), American triathlete
- Jude Herrera, American actress
- Jo Genna Jover, nicknamed "Jude", Filipino indigenous rights activist
- Jude Kelly (born 1954), British theatre director and producer
- Jude Kuring (born 1948), Australian actress
- Jude Rae (born 1956), Australian artist
- Jude Rogers (born 1978), Welsh journalist, lecturer, arts critic and broadcaster
- Jude Tallichet (born 1954), American sculptor
- Jude Terry (born 1973), British naval officer
- Jude Watson, American author
- Jude Weng, Taiwanese-born American television writer, producer, and director

== Other people with the name ==
- Jude Doyle (born 1982), American feminist author

== Fictional characters ==
- Jude Lizowski, a character on the Canadian animated series 6teen and Total DramaRama
- Jude, a character in the 2007 film Across the Universe
- Jude, a character in the Canadian teen drama series The Next Step
- Jude Duarte, a character in the novel series The Folk of the Air by Holly Black
- Jude St. Francis, a character in the book "A Little Life" by Hanya Yanagihara
- Jude Fawley, title character in the book Jude the Obscure by Thomas Hardy
- Jude Harley, in the video game Hiveswap
- Jude Quinn, a character in the 2007 film I'm Not There
