= Judith (given name) =

Feminine given name of Hebrew origin

- Pronunciation: dʒu-dɪθ
- Gender: Female
- Language: Hebrew
- Name day: celebrated on the day of St. Judith

Origin
- Origin: Hebrew
- Meaning: "praised" or "Woman of Judea"
- Region of origin: Hebrew

Other names
- Alternative spelling: Ditte (Danish), Ditka (Slovene), and Giuditta (Italian)
- Nicknames: Jude, Judy, or Judi; Jody
- Related names: Judy, Judah, Jude
- Popularity: see popular names

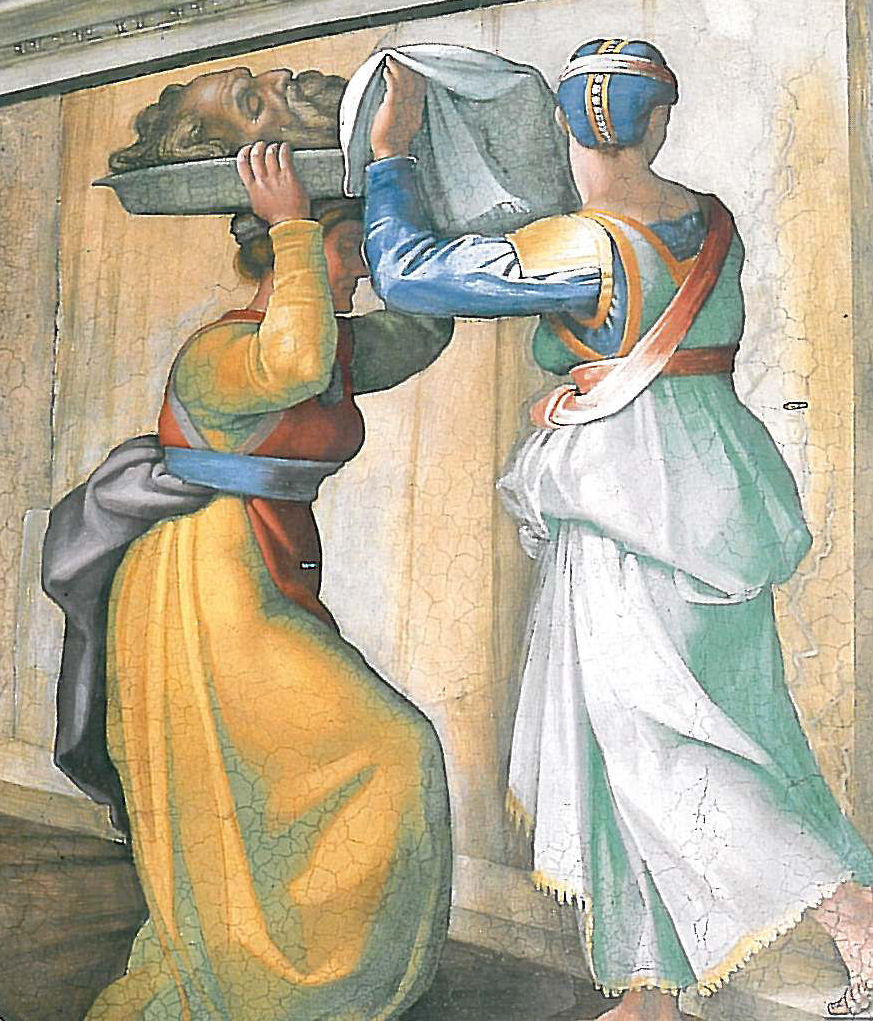
Judith and Holophernes, by Michelangelo, (Sistine Chapel, Vatican City) from Book of Judith

Judith is a feminine given name derived from the Hebrew name Yəhūdīt (יְהוּדִית), meaning "praised" and also more literally "Woman of Judea". It is the feminine form of Judah. Judith appeared in the Hebrew Bible as one of Esau's wives, while the deuterocanonical Book of Judith tells of a different Judith. It is in common usage in English, French, German, many Scandinavian languages, Dutch, and Hebrew. In Ethiopia and Eritrea it is called Yodit.

The name was among the top 50 most popular given names for girls born in the United States between 1936 and 1956, but its popularity has since declined. It was the 893rd most popular name for baby girls born in the United States in 2012, down from 74th in 1960.

== Name variants ==
Alternative forms of the name Judith include:

- Ditte (Danish)
- Ditka (Slovene)
- Giuditta (Italian)
- Iudita (Romanian)
- Iúidit (Irish)
- Jitka (Czech)
- Jodi (English)
- Jodie (English)
- Jody (English)
- Judeta (Spanish)
- Judina (Spanish)
- Judit (Catalan), (Danish), (Hungarian), (Norwegian), (Spanish), (Swedish)
- Judita (Croatian), (Czech), (Lithuanian), (Slovak), (Slovene), (Spanish)
- Judite (Portuguese)
- Judīte (Latvian)
- Juditha (French)
- Judithe (French)
- Judyta (Polish)
- Juta (Estonian)
- Jutka (Dutch), (Hungarian)
- Jutta (German)
- Jutte (Dutch), (German)
- Juut (Dutch)
- Jytte (Danish)
- Siobhán (Irish)
- Siùbhan (Scottish Gaelic)
- Yodit (Amharic)
- Yudit (Indonesian)
- Джудит Djudit (Russian)
- Јудита Judita (Serbian)
- הודעס Hudes (Yiddish)
- Иудифь Iudif’ (Russian)
- Ιουδίθ Iudith (Greek)
- יהודית Y'hudit (Hebrew)
- يهوديت Yahudit (Arabic)
- יהודית Yehudit (Hebrew)
- יידעל Yidel (Yiddish)
- יודעל Yudel (Yiddish)
- Юдифь Yudif’ (Russian)
- יוטקע Yutke (Yiddish)

== People ==
- Queen Judith (disambiguation), a number of medieval women
- Judith, heroine of the Book of Judith, one of the books included in the Biblical apocrypha
- Judith of Bavaria (died 843), Frankish queen
- Judith of Friuli (fl. 881), daughter of Eberhard
- Judith of Flanders (c. 843–c. 870), Princess of the Carolingian Franks, Queen of Wessex, Countess of Flanders
- Judith of Schweinfurt (fl. 1003–1058), wife of Bretislaus I of Bohemia
- Gudit (fl. 960), queen who sacked Axum, now in Ethiopia; also known as Judith or Yudit
- Zewditu I (1876–1930), queen of Ethiopia whose name is sometimes erroneously Anglicised as "Judith"
- Judith Allen (1911–1996), American actress
- Judith Anderson (1897–1992), Australian-born British actress
- Judith Arcana (born 1943), American writer
- Judith Arndt (born 1976), German cyclist
- Judith Arnold, pen name of Barbara Keeler, American romance novelist
- Judith Audu, Nigerian actress and blogger
- Judith Auer (1905–1944), Swiss resistance fighter
- Judith Babirye (born 1977), Ugandan gospel musician and politician
- Judith Baldwin (born 1946), American actress
- Judith Barsi (1978–1988), American child actress
- Judith Baumel (born 1956), American poet
- Judith Baxter (1955–2018), British sociolinguist
- Judith Berry (born 1961), Canadian painter
- Judith Binney (1940–2011), New Zealand historian
- Judith Black, American storyteller
- Judith Blau (born 1942), American sociologist
- Judith Blegen (born 1943), American operatic soprano
- Judith Bluck (1936–2011), English sculptor
- Judith Bowman, American author and businesswoman
- Judith K. Brodsky (born 1933), American artist and curator
- Judith Burganger (born 1939), American pianist
- Judith Butler (born 1956), American philosopher and writer
- Judith Martin Cadore (born 1957), American family physician
- Judith Chemla (born 1985), French actress
- Judith Collins (born 1959), New Zealand politician
- Judith Alice Clark (born 1949), American activist and convicted felon
- Judith Clute (born 1942), Canadian painter, graphic designer, printmaker, and illustrator
- Judith Curry (born 1953), American climatologist
- Judith Davidoff (1927–2021), American cellist and violinist
- Judith Donath (born 1962), American computer scientist
- Judith Dupont (1925–2025), French psychoanalyst, translator, and editor
- Judith Durham (1943–2022), Australian singer
- Judith Exner, mistress of John F. Kennedy
- Judith Evelyn (1909–1967), American actress
- Judith Fedder (born 1958), American United States Air Force lieutenant general
- Judith Fergin (born 1951), American ambassador
- Judith Forrai (born 1949), Hungarian dentist, professor, and medical and science historian
- Judith Furse (1912–1974), English actress
- Judith Godrèche (born 1972), French actress
- Judith Godwin (1930–2021), American abstract painter
- Judith L. Green, American education scholar
- Judith R. Goodstein (born 1939), American mathematics and science historian
- Judith Hand (born 1940), American evolutionary biologist
- Judith Heard (born 1986), Ugandan fashion model
- Judith Hermann (born 1970), German writer
- Judith Heumann (1947–2023), American disability rights activist
- Judith Hill (born 1984), American singer and songwriter
- Judith Hoag (born 1963), American actress
- Judith Holofernes (born 1976), German singer and songwriter
- Judith Ann Carter Horton (1866–1948), African American educator and librarian
- Judith Ivey (born 1951), American actress and theatre director
- Judith Jamison (born 1943), American choreographer and dancer
- Judith Jones (1924–2017), American writer and editor
- Judith Katzir (born 1963), Israeli author
- Judith Kazantzis (1940–2018), English activist and poet
- Judith Kent (born 1956), American business executive and philanthropist
- Judith Keppel (born 1942), English quiz show contestant
- Judith Kerr (1923–2019), German-born British writer and illustrator
- Judith Kleinfeld (1944–2025), American professor of psychology and author
- Judith Klinman (born 1941), American biochemist and molecular biologist
- Judith Krantz (1928–2019), American author and journalist
- Judith Lefeber (born 1981), German singer
- Judith Leiber (1921–2018), Hungarian–American businesswoman and fashion designer
- Judith Leyster (1609–1660), Dutch painter
- Judith Liberman (born 1978), French storyteller
- Judith Light (born 1949), American actress
- Judith Livingston (born 1955), American lawyer
- Judith Lorber (born 1931), American sociologist
- Judith Lucy (born 1968), Australian comedian
- Judith Macgregor (born 1952), British diplomat
- Judith Mackrell (fl. 2026), English dance critic and biographer
- Judith Malina (1926–2015), German–born American actress
- Judith Maro (1919–2011), Ukrainian–born Israeli–Welsh writer
- Judith Maxwell (born 1943), Canadian economist and political scientist
- Judith Ann Mayotte (born 1937), American humanitarian, professor and theologian
- Judith McKenna (born 1966), English businesswoman
- Judith Moffett (born 1942), American academic and author
- Judith Neelley (born 1964), American serial killer
- Judith Nicosia, American soprano
- Judith Okah (born 2006), Nigerian footballer
- Judith Pierce (1930–2003), English operatic soprano
- Judith Rakers (born 1976), German journalist and television presenter
- Judith Resnik (1949–1986), American astronaut and engineer
- Judith Roitman (born 1945), American mathematician
- Judith Schmutz (born 1996), Swiss politician
- Judit Selymes (born 1940), Hungarian-American theater director and writer
- Judith Tyberg (1902–1980), American Sanskrit scholar
- Judith Uitermark (born 1971), Dutch politician
- Judith Vanistendael (born 1974), Belgian comics author and illustrator
- Judith (Yehudit) Weinstock (born 1940), Israeli author
- Judith Wiesner (born 1966), former professional tennis player from Austria
- Judith Wood (1906–2000), American actress
- Judith Zaffirini, American politician
- Mãe Judith (died 1940), Candomblé priestess

== Fictional characters ==
- Judith, in the 2008 video game Tales of Vesperia
- Judith Dinsmore, a recurring character in the web series The Most Popular Girls in School
- Judith Grimes, in the TV show and comic The Walking Dead
- Judith "Judy" Hopps, the rabbit protagonist of Disney's 2016 animated film Zootopia
- Judith Iscariot, in the film Monty Python's Life of Brian
- Judith Mossman (Half Life)
- Judith Myers (Halloween), eldest sister of Michael Myers in the 1978 movie Halloween
- Judith Phillips, French name of Jodie Phillips, elder sister of Ellie Phillips in the animated series Fireman Sam
- Judith, the Scourge Diva, a minor character in the popular trading card game Magic: the Gathering
- Judith Shakespeare, the hypothetical sister of English playwright and poet William Shakespeare, invented by English writer Virginia Woolf in order to illustrate historical (and persisting) inequalities in the treatment of the sexes as well as the implications of this unequal treatment for art and wider culture. The 1985 rockabilly song "Shakespeare's Sister" by the English rock band The Smiths, and in turn the Irish pop rock duo Shakespears Sister [sic], were named with reference to this character of Woolf’s. The real-life younger daughter of William Shakespeare was also named Judith
- Judith von Daphnel, a major character in Fire Emblem: Three Houses and Fire Emblem Warriors: Three Hopes

== See also ==
- Judah (disambiguation)
- Judith (disambiguation)
- Judy (given name)
