= Judith (disambiguation) =

Judith may refer to:

== Given name ==
- Judith (given name), including a list of people and fictional characters

== Bible ==
- Book of Judith, a deuterocanonical book of the Old Testament
  - Judith (homily), an Old English homily written by Aelfric of Eynsham around 1000

== Art ==
- Judith (Giorgione), a painting by the Italian painter Giorgione, circa 1504
- Judith (Vouet, Munich), a c.1620–1625 painting by Simon Vouet
- Judith (Vouet, Vienna), a 1620–1622 painting by Simon Vouet
- Judith I, a 1901 painting by Gustav Klimt

== Poems ==
- "Judith" (poem), an Old English poem about the heroine of the Book of Judith
- "Judith", a poem by Patti Smith from her 1972 book Seventh Heaven

== Novels ==
- Judith (novel), a 1978 novel by British author Brian Cleeve
- Judith, a 1978 novel by Aritha Van Herk
- Judith, a 1986 novel by Nicholas Mosley

== Theatre ==
- Judith (Hebbel), an 1841 tragic play by Friedrich Hebbel about the Biblical heroine
- Judith (Giraudoux), a 1931 play by Jean Giraudoux
  - Judith, a 1962 adaption of the Giraudoux play by Christopher Fry
- Judith, play by Kjeld Abell
- Judith: A Parting from the Body, a 1992 play by Howard Barker

== Film and television ==
- Judith (1923 film), a Dutch film
- Judith (1966 film), set in Palestine shortly before the end of the British Mandate
- Judith (TV series), a 2000 Swedish TV series

== Music ==
- Judith sive Bethulia liberata, H.391 (? mid 1670s) oratorio by Marc-Antoine Charpentier
- Judith, cantate by Sébastien de Brossard
- Judith (oratorio), a 1761 oratorio by Thomas Arne
- Judith, an 1888 work by Hubert Parry
- Judith (Serov), an 1863 opera by Alexander Serov
- Judith (album), a 1975 album by singer Judy Collins
- Judith (Matthus), a 1985 opera by Siegfried Matthus
- "Judith" (A Perfect Circle song), 2000
- "Judith" (Pat Boone song)

== Other uses ==
- 664 Judith, a minor planet orbiting the Sun
- Judith River, Montana
- Judith (ballet), a 1949 ballet by William Schuman
- List of storms named Judith

== See also ==
- Judy (disambiguation)
- Yehudit
- Judita, a 1501 Croatian epic poem by Marko Marulić
- Gudit Medieval Ethiopian Queen, likely variant of the same name
