= Yehudit =

Yehudit, sometimes Yehudith Hebrew: יהודית is a Hebrew feminine variant of the given name Yehudi. Sometimes it is Anglicized to "Judith", which is in fact derived from "Yehudit". Notable people with the name include:

- Yehudit Arnon (1926–2013), Israeli dancer and choreographer
- Yehudith Birk (1926–2013), Israeli biochemist
- Yehudit Harari (1885–1979), Israeli educator and writer
- Yehudit Hendel (1921–2014), Israeli author
- Yehudith Huebner (1921–2023), Israeli civil servant, diplomat and social activist
- Yehudit Kafri (born 1935), Israeli poet, writer and translator
- Yehudit Naot (1944–2004), Israeli scientist and politician
- Yehudit Nessyahu (1925–2003), Israeli Mossad agent
- Yehudit Ravitz (born 1956), Israeli singer and producer
- Yehudit Sasportas (born 1969), Israeli artist
- Yehudit Simhonit (1902–1991), activist and politician
- Yudika (1898–1988), pen name of Yehudis Tsik, Canadian poet

== Judith ==
- Judith Maro (1919–2011), born Ida Yehudit Anastasia Grossman, Israeli-Welsh writer
- Judith Weinstock (born 1940), Israeli author

== See also ==
- Judith (disambiguation)
- Otzma Yehudit
