= Ejiogu =

- Gender: Male
- Language(s): Igbo

Origin
- Word/name: Nigeria
- Meaning: holder of the staff/power

Ejiogu audio is a Nigerian surname of Igbo origin.

== Notable people with the surname include ==
- Chijioke Ejiogu (born 1984), Nigerian footballer
- Sir Jude Ejiogu, Nigerian politician
