= Judah (given name) =

- Gender: Male

Other names
- Related names: Jude, Yehudah, Yudah

Judah is a masculine given name of Hebrew origin. It is the English form of Yehudah (Hebrew: יְהוּדָה), the Hebrew name of the biblical figure Judah, founder of the Tribe of Judah and thus, the eponym of the Kingdom of Judah and the Jews.

== Etymology ==
The Hebrew name for Judah, Yehuda (יהודה), literally "thanksgiving" or "praise," is a variant form of the root Y-D-H (ידה), "to thank" or "to praise." His birth is recorded at Gen. 29:35; upon his birth, Leah exclaims, "This time I will praise the LORD/YHWH," with the Hebrew word for "I will praise," odeh (אודה) sharing the same root as Yehuda. Alternatively, Edward Lipiński connected Hebrew yĕhūdā with Arabic whd / wahda "cleft, ravine". Jude is an English form of the name.

== Biblical and ancient historical figures ==
In chronological order:

- Judah (son of Jacob), fourth son of the Biblical patriarch Jacob
- Judah Maccabee or Judas Maccabeus, Jewish priest who led the Maccabean Revolt against the Seleucid Empire (167–160 BCE)
- Judas Iscariot, Hebrew Yehūḏā ʾĪš-Qǝrīyyōṯ, 'Judah, man of Kerioth' (died c. AD 30), one of the original Twelve Apostles of Jesus
- Judah ha-Nasi, also Judah the Prince or Judah I, Jewish sage and leader (2nd century)
- Judah II, Jewish sage (3rd century)
- Judah III, Jewish sage (3rd and 4th century)
- Judah IV, Talmudic sage (4th century)
- Judah b. Meremar, Babylonian sage (5th century?)

== Saints ==
- Saint Jude (Thaddeus) the Apostle, one of Twelve,
- Saint Jude, brother of Jesus, one of Seventy-two,
- Saint Justus (Jude) of Jerusalem, third Bishop of Jerusalem,
- Saint Jude Barsabbas, prophet, Church leader,
- Saint Jude, one of Holy Maccabean Martyrs,
- Saint Jude Cyriacus, bishop of Ancona,
- Saint Jude Machabeus, priest and leader,
- Saint Jude, son of Jacob, Old Testament patriarch,
- Saint Jude, host of Saint Paul in Damascus,

== People with the given name ==
=== Judah ===
In alphabetical order:

- Judah P. Benjamin (1811–1884), politician and lawyer in the United States and Confederate States of America
- Judah Bergman aka "Jack Kid Berg" (1909–1991), English world champion Hall of Fame junior welterweight boxer
- Judah Loew ben Bezalel (1512-1526 – 1609) or Rabbi Loew of Prague, the Maharal, Talmudic scholar, Jewish mystic and philosopher
- Judah David Bleich (born 1936), American rabbi and authority on Jewish law and ethics
- Judah Folkman (1933–2008), American cellular biologist, founder of the field of antiangiogenesis
- Judah Friedlander (born 1969), American actor best known from 30 Rock
- Judah Halevi (1075–1141), medieval Spanish Jewish philosopher and poet
- Judah Hertz (born 1948/49), American real estate investor
- Judah Kirkham (born 2009), American "Littleman" and heart transplant candidate
- Judah Lewis (born 2000 or 2001), American actor
- Judah Leon Magnes (1877–1948), rabbi, first President of the Hebrew University of Jerusalem
- Judah Nagler (born 1980), singer, guitarist, and songwriter for indie-pop band The Velvet Teen
- "Judah son of Jesus", name on one of the ossuaries in the 1st-century Talpiot Tomb

=== Yehuda(h), Yehudi ===
In alphabetical order of their surname:

- Yehuda Alharizi (mid-12th century – 1225), medieval Spanish rabbi, translator, poet and traveller
- Yehuda Amichai (1924–2000), Israeli poet
- Yehuda Amital (1924–2010), dean of Yeshivat Har Etzion, former Israeli cabinet member
- Yehuda Atedji (born 1961), Israeli Olympic windsurfer
- Yehuda Avidan (born 1962), Israeli official
- Yehuda Bauer (1926–2024), Czech-Israeli historian of the Holocaust
- Yehuda Zvi Blum (1931–2025), Slovak-born Israeli legal scholar and diplomat
- Yehuda Danon (born 1940), Israeli doctor
- Yehuda Gilad (musician), contemporary clarinetist and conductor
- Yehuda Gilad (politician) (born 1955), Israeli rabbi and politician
- Yehudah Glick (born 1965), American-born Israeli Orthodox rabbi, activist, and politician
- Yehuda Green (born 1959), Shlomo Carlebach-inspired Hasidic singer, composer, and hazzan
- Yehuda Hayuth (1946–2022), Israeli professor of geography
- Yehudah Jacobs (c. 1940–2020), American rabbi
- Yehuda Krinsky (born 1933), Chabad Lubavitch Hasidic rabbi
- Yehuda Kurtzer (born 1977), President of The Shalom Hartman Institute of North America
- Yehuda Edwin "Honest Ed" Mirvish (1914-2007), Canadian businessman, philanthropist, and impresario
- Yehuda Moraly (born 1948), Israeli theater researcher, playwright, director, actor, and professor
- Yehuda Poliker (born 1950), Israeli singer-songwriter
- Yehudi Menuhin (1916–1999), world-famous violinist
- Yehuda Tzadka (1910–1991), dean of Porat Yosef Yeshiva, Jerusalem
- Yehuda Wiener-Gafni (born 1930), Israeli Olympic basketball player
- Yehuda Weisenstein (born 1955), Israeli Olympic fencer
- Yehuda Zadok (born 1958), Israeli Olympic runner

== Fictional characters ==
- Judah Ben-Hur, main character of the 1880 Lew Wallace novel Ben-Hur: A Tale of the Christ and film adaptations
- Judah Mannowdog, character in the TV show Bojack Horseman
- Judah Rosenthal, character in the film Crimes and Misdemeanors played by Martin Landau
- Judah, character in Weeds (TV series) played by Jeffrey Dean Morgan

== See also ==
- Judah (disambiguation)
- Judas (disambiguation)
