= Samulski =

Samulski, feminine: Samulska is a Polish-language surname. Notable people with the surname include:

- Daniela Samulski (1984–2018), German swimmer
- Oktawian Samulski, Polish luger
- R. Jude Samulski (born 1954), American scientist, inventor, and academic
