= Nicosia (disambiguation) =

Nicosia is the capital of Cyprus.

Nicosia may also refer to:

== Places ==
=== Cyprus ===
- North Nicosia, capital of Northern Cyprus (de facto state recognized only by Turkey)

==== Administrative units ====
- Nicosia Municipality, governing body of south Nicosia
- Nicosia Turkish Municipality, governing body of North Nicosia
- Nicosia District, the Republic of Cyprus district surrounding Nicosia
- Lefkoşa District, the Northern Cyprus district surrounding North Nicosia

=== Italy ===
- Nicosia, Sicily, comune in the Province of Enna

== People ==
- Emanuele Nicosia (1953–2016), Italian automobile designer
- Felix of Nicosia (1715–1787), Italian saint
- Francis R. Nicosia (1944–2023), American historian
- Gerald Nicosia (born 1949), American author, poet, journalist, interviewer, and literary critic
- Gianmarco Nicosia (born 1998), Italian water polo player
- Judith Nicosia, American soprano and professor of voice
- Nic Nicosia (born 1951), American art photographer
- Salvatore Nicosia (born 1963), Italian long-distance runner
- Steve Nicosia (born 1955), American baseball player
- Nicosia Lawson (born 1983), Cayman Islands beauty queen
