= The Oxford Magazine =

English review magazine and newspaper

The Oxford Magazine is a review magazine and newspaper published in Oxford, England.

== History ==
The Oxford Magazine was established in 1883 and published weekly during Oxford University terms. Contributors included: J. R. R. Tolkien, whose character Tom Bombadil, who later featured in The Lord of the Rings, first appeared in the magazine around 1933. A joint poem by C. S. Lewis and Owen Barfield called "Abecedarium Philosophicum" was published on 30 November 1933. Dorothy Sayers published two of her poems, Hymn in Contemplation of Sudden Death and Epitaph for a Young Musician, in the magazine. W. H. Auden published his early poem "The Sunken Lane" there while he was an undergraduate at Oxford University. The magazine has also published the poets H. W. Garrod, Olivia McCannon, Jude Cowan Montague, Michael Gessner, Kieron Winn, John Wain, Elizabeth Jennings and others.

It now functions "as a commentator on university affairs", that is, an independent forum where members of Congregation can debate academic policy. While it is distributed along with the Oxford University Gazette, it sometimes carries articles critical of the University's leadership.

The magazine continues to publish poetry, including the work of Oxford Professor of Poetry Simon Armitage. As of 2025, the current literary editor is the poet Jane Griffiths, who took up this position after Lucy Newlyn. Newlyn had been the literary editor of the magazine since 2011. The previous literary editor of the magazine was the poet Bernard O'Donoghue, who was preceded by the poet David Constantine. The general editor of the magazine in 2021 was Tim Horder, Emeritus Fellow in Medicine at Jesus College, Oxford.

Latterly issued four times each term, the magazine became online only in December 2020 saving the university £45,000 a year. In 2022 the university ended all personnel and computer support, leaving the editors unable to continue publication. Academic staff prepared a motion for debate at Congregation in November 2022 which "instructs" the university council to reverse the decision and to ensure the continued publication of Oxford Magazine under the preexisting arrangements. Council later stated that the motion was acceptable to it and agreed to "continue the arrangements for the Oxford Magazine which were in place in 2021–22 whilst its longer-term future is debated."

It should not be confused with Oxford Magazine or In Oxford Magazine, both commercial listings/shopping magazines covering the City of Oxford, nor with an earlier periodical also called The Oxford Magazine which was published in London from 1768 to 1776.

== See also ==
- Oxford Poetry
