= Guy de Téramond =

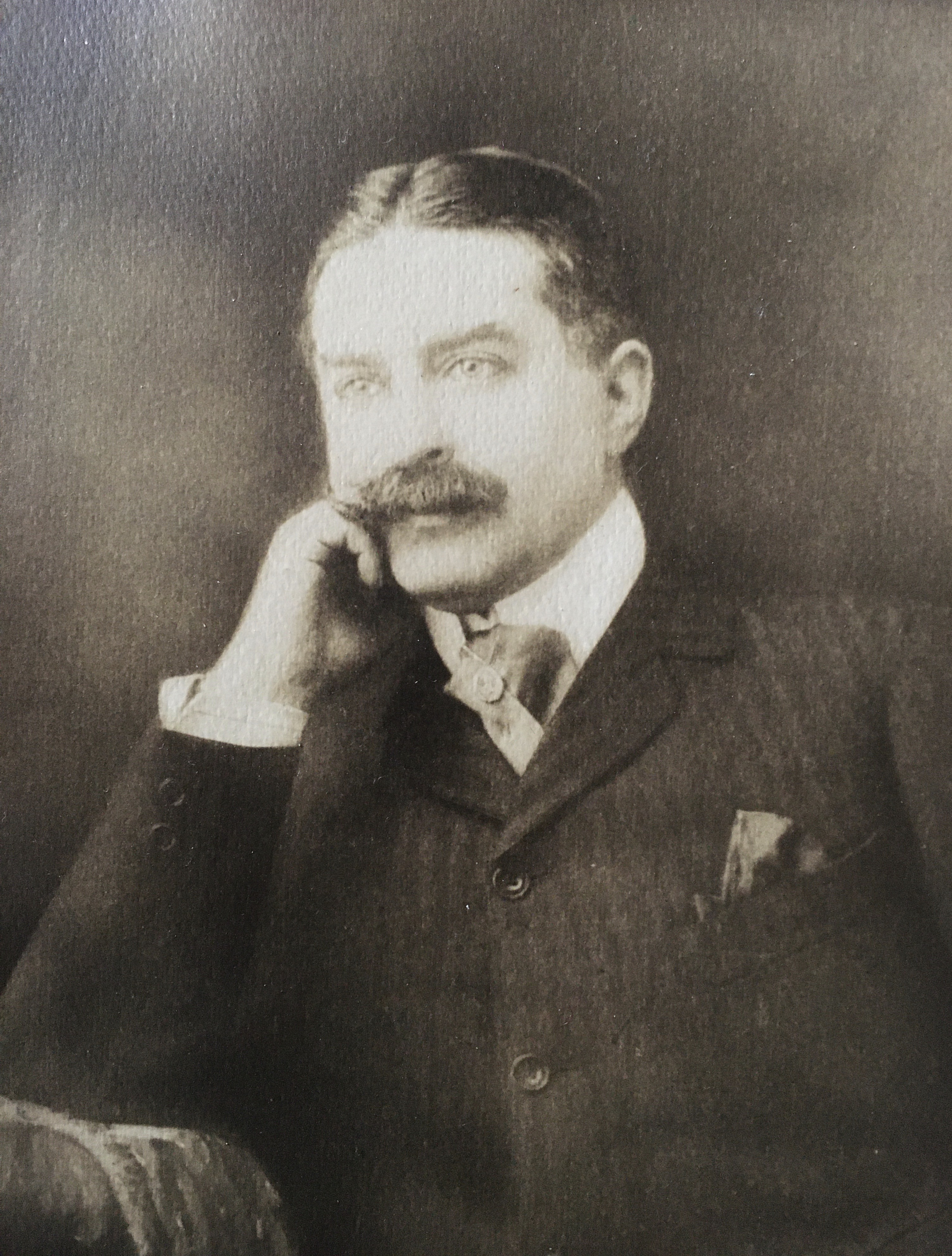
- Guy de Téramond vers 1920.
- Born: François-Edmond Gautier; 3 février 1869; 8th arrondissement of Paris
- Died: 12 novembre 1957; 17th arrondissement of Paris
- Occupations: Writer of novels, drama, poetry
- Writing career
- Language: French
- Genres: Novels, drama, essays, poetry

François-Edmond Gautier de Téramond, known as Guy de Téramond (1869–1957), was a French novelist, playwright, and poet, author of numerous popular works of fiction including romantic and police novels. He also wrote novels in the "Merveilleux scientifique" genre.

== Biography ==
Born in Paris on 3 February 1869, Guy Gautier de Téramond was the son of Paul Gautier and Marie Durécu. His brother was the singer Paul Franz, known for his performances of Wagner.

His first published work was a collection of poetry, Les Vers de vingt ans (1891). He began publishing in magazines including Le Nouvel Écho starting in 1892, and also began writing for opera and theater. He started writing novels in 1896, in popular genres like spy novels, police novels, historical novels, and science fiction. He died on 12 November 1957.

== Work ==
=== Novels ===
- Les Joies de la possession (1896)
- Les Pantins du cœur (1898)
- Sur le chemin du bonheur (1899)
- L'Art de l'adultère (1902)
- La Glorieuse Canaille, ill. par Augustin Grass-Mick (1902)
- La Route amoureuse (1903)
- La Volupté de vivre : roman fantaisiste (1903)
- L'Étreinte dangereuse : roman passionnel (1904)
- Impériales voluptés (1905)
- L'Adoration perpétuelle (1906)
- Une courtisane grecque (1906)
- L'Amant (1907)
- Le Mystérieux Inconnu : policier (1909)
- L'Homme qui peut tout ou Le Miracle du professeur Wolmar (1910)
- Maisons de science (1911)
- Le Secret de la machine à écrire (1911)
- Rose d'or (1911)
- Comme dans un rêve (1912)
- L'Accident de la ligne No. 13 bis (1913)
- L'Homme qui voit à travers les murailles (1913)
- Les Petits Princes (1917)
- Ravengar (1917)
- La Maison de la haine, grand roman-cinéma (1919)
- Une amoureuse (1921)
- Le Fuave de la Sierra, grand roman-cinéma d'aventures et de mystère (1921)
- Le Mystère de la double croix (1922)
- Le Secret du sous-marin, suivi de La Fille du savant et Bertha l'espionne (1922)
- Au cœur de l'Afrique sauvage (1923)
- La Terreur des courtisanes (1925)
- Miss Doon, reporteresse (1926)
- La Force de l'amour (1926)
- Une rose sous la neige (1926)
- Une maîtresse, un maître (1926)
- Un pauvre petit cœur (1926)
- Amour de gentilhomme (1927)
- Cœur d'amante, cœur de mère (1927)
- Le Calvaire d'une amoureuse (1927)
- Les Nuits tragiques de Londres (1928)
- Martha l'Espagnole (1928)
- Le Roman d'un milliardaire (1928)
- Une rose sous le soleil (1929)
- Les Bas-fonds, Ferenczi & fils, (10 volumes, 1929)
- Les Dossiers secrets de la police (10 volumes, 1930)
- Le Collier de lady Grace : roman d'aventures (1930)
- Petite Fée : roman d'amour et d'aventures (1930)
- Le Roman-reportage, feuilleton en 30 épisodes (1932–1933)
- Les Requins (1932)
- L'Assassinat de la comtesse Sobosk (1932)
- Le Poste mystérieux (1932)
- Gamins de Bruxelles (1932)
- Cœur d'acrobate (1933)
- La Filleule de la marquise (1933)
- Les Amours du chevalier d'Eon (2 volumes, 1933)
- Une femme chez les Soviets (Ferenczi, 1933)
- L'Énigme du doigt coupé (1937)
- Moute et les Deux Cousins (1937)
- Colette et le Vieux Monsieur (1946)
- Le Mariage de Cécile (1947)
- Le Cœur de Mirette (1949)

=== Theater ===
- Phrynette vaincue, bluette en un acte et en vers (1892)
- La Première Étape, comédie en 1 acte (1895)
- L'Âne mort et le Pince-nez, comédie-vaudeville en 1 acte (1895)
- Deux sapeurs pour une bonne, saynète en 1 acte, musique d'Albert Morias (1896), en collaboration avec R. de Boÿ
- Nos bonnes nounous, pochade militaire en 1 acte, musique d'Albert Morias (1896), en collaboration avec R. de Boÿ
- Les Trois Gosses, opérette bouffe, musique de Alphonse Gramet (1897), en collaboration avec B. Lebreton
- Un jupon par la fenêtre, vaudeville-opérette en 1 acte, musique d'Alphonse Gramet (1897)
- Fanchonnette, opérette militaire en 1 acte, musique d'Albert Morias (1898), en collaboration avec Hippolyte Barbé
- La Petite Zaza, comédie-parodie en 1 acte (1898)
- Les Vieux Petits Trucs, comédie en 1 acte (1898)
- Une brouille, saynète en un acte (1898)
- Le Jour du frotteur, comédie en 1 acte (1899)
- Le Parc au biches, opérette en 1 acte, musique d'Eugène Daulnay (1899), en collaboration avec Jean Duroc
- L'Étude Chacoupet, folie-vaudeville (1899)
- L'Huissier des bons jours, comédie-vaudeville en 1 acte (1900), en collaboration avec Hippolyte Barbé
- Le Réserviste de Falaise, vaudeville militaire (1906)
- Une répétition d'Esther, pièce en 1 acte (1918)
- La Première Pierre, saynète (1920)
- La Petite Maud, comédie en 2 actes (1921)
- Journaux de mode, comédie en 1 acte (1935), en collaboration avec Marcelle Guerrier
- Un jour de pluie, comédie en 1 acte (1935), en collaboration avec Marcelle Guerrier
- Ces demoiselles Montagraine, comédie en 1 acte (1935), en collaboration avec Marcelle Guerrier
- Le Numéro 508, comédie en 1 acte (1935)
- Cadet Roussel, comédie radiophonique en 2 actes (1935)
- Le Rat de ville et le Rat des champs, comédie en 1 acte pour trois jeunes filles (1935), en collaboration avec H. Galliéni
- Le Plat du chef, comédie en 1 acte (1936)
- Le Vase de Chine, comédie en 1 acte (1936)
- Un cosaque du Don, comédie en 1 acte (1936)
- L'Auberge de la poste, comédie radiophonique en 1 acte (1936)
- Les Deux Sœurs, comédie radiophonique en 2 actes (1936)
- L'Antiquaire, comédie radiophonique en un acte (1937)
- Le Bal du prince charmant, comédie radiophonique en 2 actes (1937)
- Une nuit diabolique, comédie radiophonique en 1 acte (1938)
- Il était une petite bergère, comédie radiophonique en 2 actes (1938)
- Un brave petit Français, pièce radiophonique en 3 actes (1938)
- Les Étrangleurs de l'Inde, drame en 7 tableaux (1938)
- Yakou, le petit sabotier, comédie enfantine pour la radio (1939)
- Un mois d'arsenic, comédie policière en 4 actes (1940), en collaboration avec Maxime-Léry
- La Cousine Wanda, comédie en 4 actes (1946)
- Petite Fée, comédie inédite en 4 actes (1947), adaptation du roman éponyme

=== Other publications ===
- Au pays des lettres (1895)
- Les Dessous de la cour d'Angleterre (1905)
- La Beauté du nu dans l'antiquité, la religion, la vie moderne (études physiologiques). Ouvrage artistique illustré par le nu photographique d'après nature et comprenant 100 études (1906)
- La Guerre sur mer, corsaires, pirates, boucaniers, flibustiers, négriers, etc. (1912)
- L'Héroïsme en soutane : I. Les Prêtres-soldats (1919)
- Les Sièges de Verdun (1919)
- Madame de Montespan (1919)
- Les Contes d’« Excelsior », Bibliogs, 2016.

=== Adaptations ===
- Âmes de fous by Germaine Dulac (1918)

== Bibliography ==
- Mesplède, Claude (2007). K., Joseph (ed.). Dictionnaire des littératures policières. Temps noir (in French). Vol. 2. Nantes. pp. 866–867. ISBN 978-2-910-68645-1. OCLC 315873361.
- Costes, Guy; Altairac, Joseph (2018). Rétrofictions, encyclopédie de la conjecture romanesque rationnelle francophone (in French). Vol. M–Z. Encrage. pp. 1971–1974. ISBN 978-2-36058-089-7.
- de Courtivron, Isabelle (2025). Mon illustre inconnu: Enquête sur un polygraphe de la Belle Époque (in French). Librinova. ISBN 979-1040592914.
