= St Patrick's Church, Newport =

St Patrick's Church
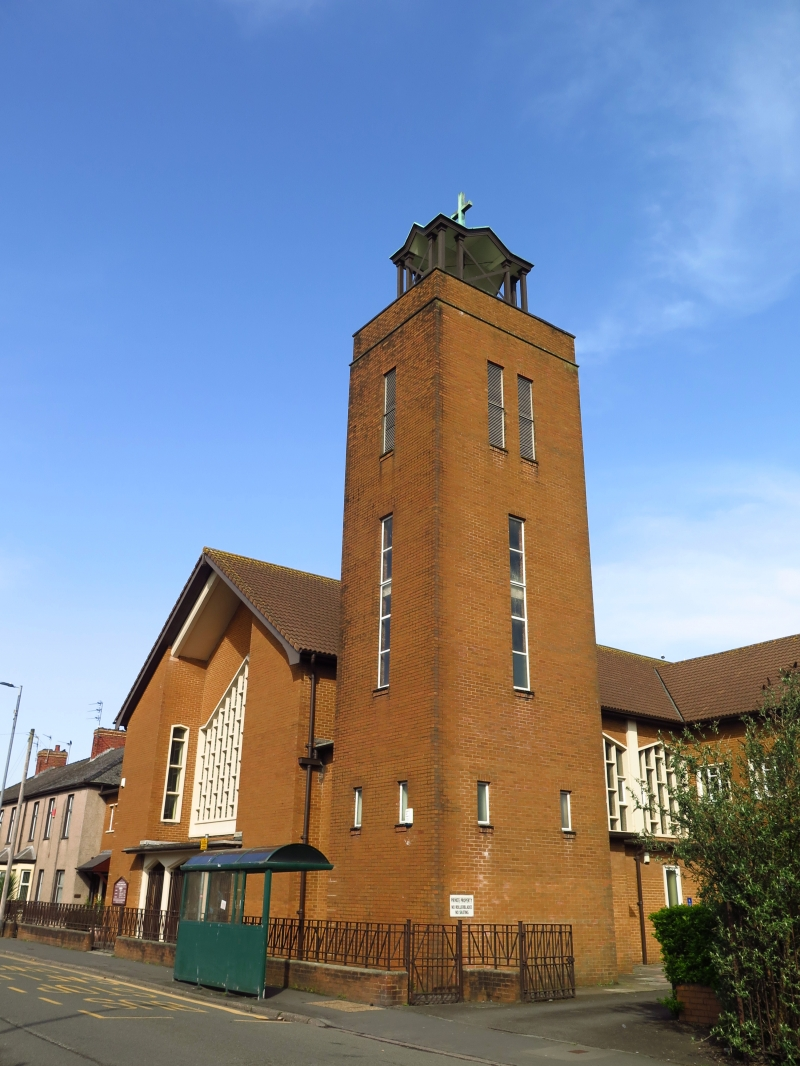
- St Patrick's Church
- 51.583°N 2.9665°W
- Location: Newport
- Country: Wales
- Denomination: Roman Catholic
- Website: StPatricksNewport.org.uk

History
- Status: Parish church
- Founder: Rosminians
- Dedication: Saint Patrick
- Consecrated: 10 June 1980

Architecture
- Functional status: Active
- Heritage designation: Grade II listed
- Designated: 31 October 2011
- Architect: Cyril Bates
- Completed: 28 August 1963

Administration
- Province: Cardiff-Menevia
- Archdiocese: Cardiff-Menevia
- Deanery: Newport
- Parish: St Patrick's

St Patrick's Church is a Roman Catholic parish church in Newport, Wales. It was built from 1962 to 1962 for the Rosminians, who continue to serve the church. It is situated on Cromwell Road near the city centre. Its interior was furnished by Jonah Jones and it is a Grade II listed building.

== History ==
=== Foundation ===
In 1890, the population of Newport increased with the opening of a steel mill by John Lysaght and Co. In 1909, a building on Corporation Road was bought to act as a place of worship for the increasing Catholic population. In 1925, a church made of iron was built on Cromwell Road and it became the centre of the new parish. The church itself was also made by John Lysaght and Co., was designed by Cyril F. Bates and had a capacity of 550 people. It was opened by the Archbishop of Cardiff Francis Mostyn. In 1927, a presbytery was built and in 1947, a church hall.

=== Construction ===
In 1962, building work started on a larger church, with a capacity of 600. As before, it was designed by Cyril Bates. Construction was done by Noel T. James Ltd. On 28 August 1963, the church was opened by the Archbishop of Cardiff, John Murphy. On 10 June 1980, the church was consecrated. It has mosaics, a baldacchino, the east window and carvings above the chancel all designed by Jonah Jones.

== Parish ==
The church remains in its own parish, which is still served by the Rosminians. Its Sunday Masses are at 6:00pm on Saturday and at 10:00am on Sunday.

== See also ==
- Archdiocese of Cardiff-Menevia
