= Newport Deanery =

The Newport Deanery is a Roman Catholic deanery in the Archdiocese of Cardiff-Menevia, previously in the Archdiocese of Cardiff that covers several churches in Newport and Monmouthshire, Wales.

The dean is centred at St Gabriel's Church in Ringland, Newport. Also in the deanery is the All Saints Parish, which comprises St Anne's Church, Ss Basil and Gwladys Church, St David's Church, St David Lewis Church, St Mary's Church and St Michael's Church, in Newport.

== Churches ==
- St Mary, Chepstow
- St Paul, Caldicot - served from Chepstow
- St Anne, Malpas, in the All Saints Parish
- Saints Basil and Gwladys, Rogerstone, in the All Saints Parish
- St David, Maesglas, in the All Saints Parish
- St David Lewis, Bettws, in the All Saints Parish
- St Mary, Stow Hill, in the All Saints Parish
- St Michael's Church, Pillgwenlly, in the All Saints Parish
- St Gabriel, Ringland
- Saints Julius, Aaron and David, Caerleon - served from St Gabriel
- St Patrick's, Newport - served by the Rosminians

== Gallery ==
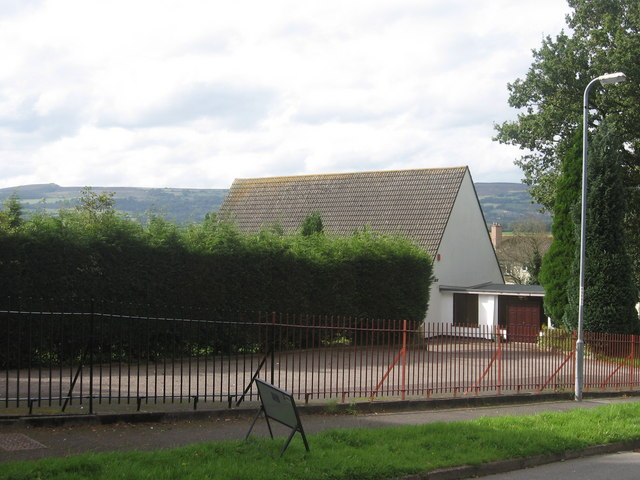
St Anne, Malpas

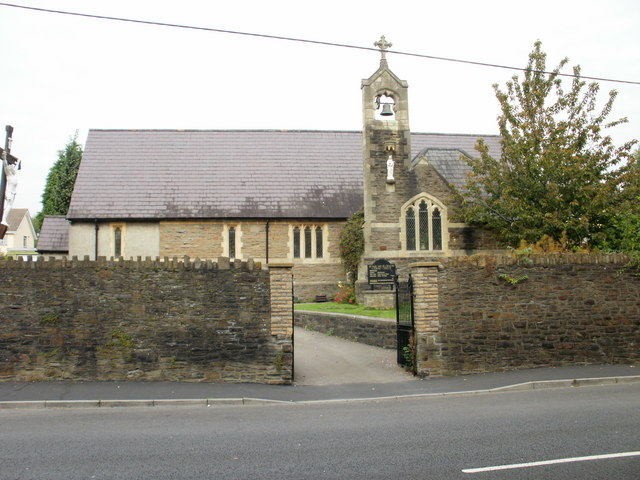
Saints Basil and Gwladys, Rogerstone

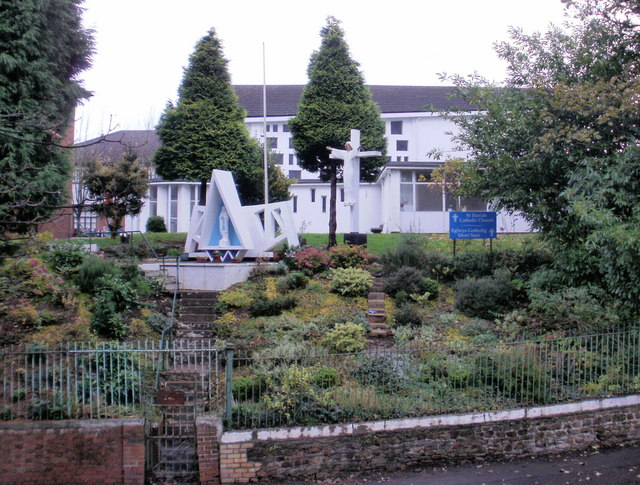
St David, Maesglas

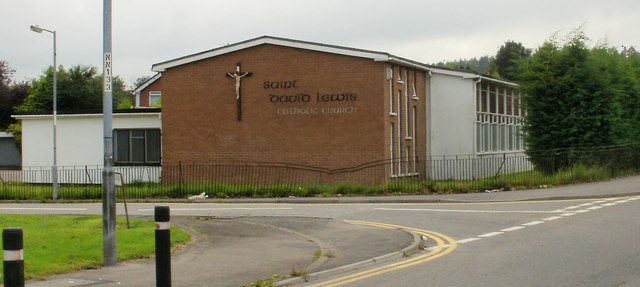
St David Lewis, Bettws

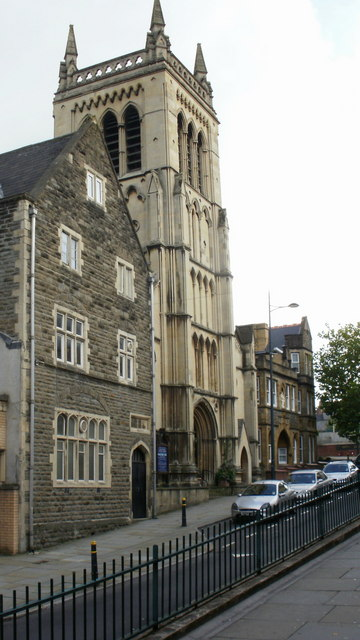
St Mary, Stow Hill

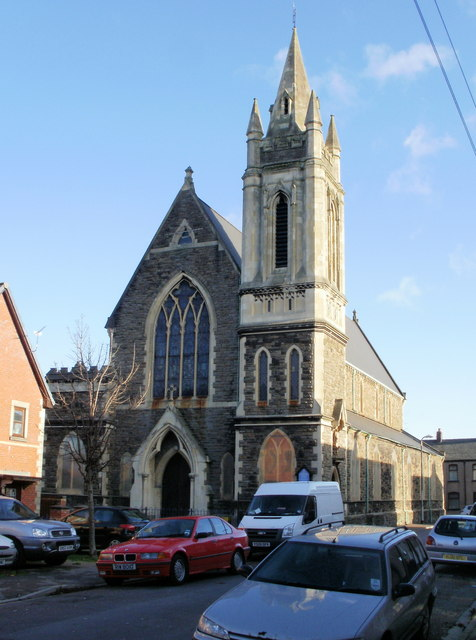
St Michael, Pillgwenlly

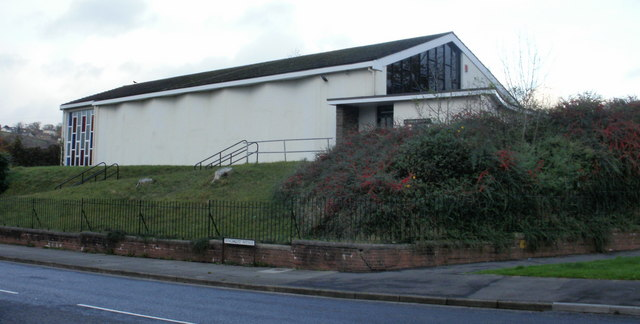
St Gabriel, Ringland

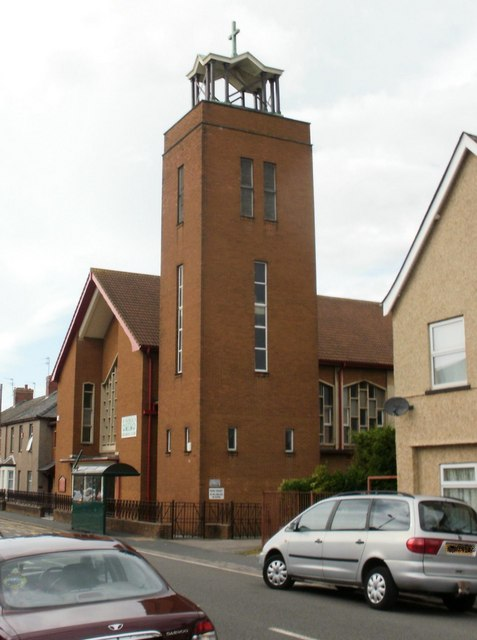
St Patrick, Newport
