= Jonah Jones (sculptor) =

Durham-born Welsh sculptor, calligrapher and writer

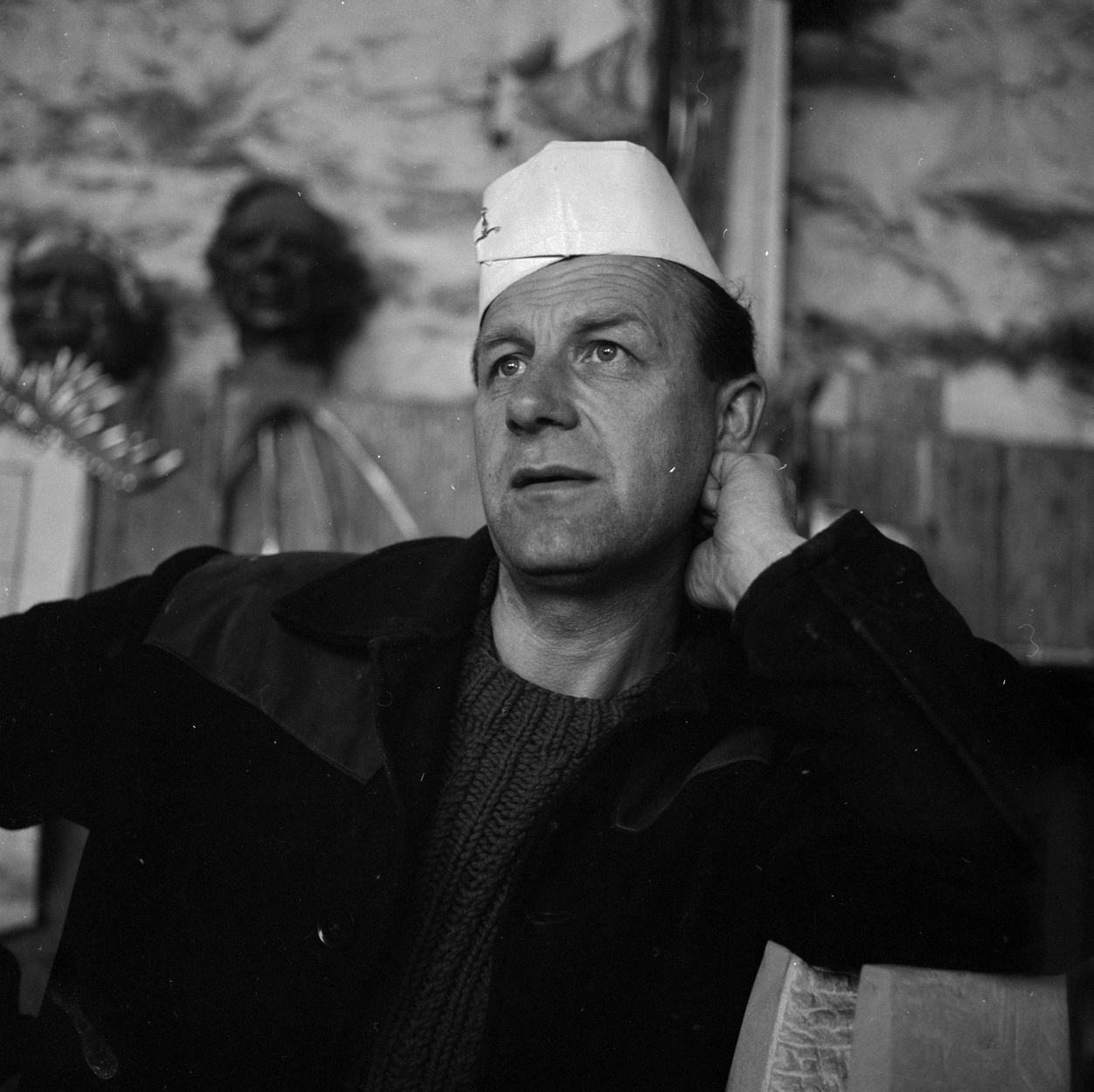
- Jones in 2001
- Born: Leonard Jones; 17 February 1919; Wardley, Gateshead, County Durham, England
- Died: 29 November 2004 (aged 85)
- Known for: sculpture, writing, graphics

Leonard Jones (17 February 1919 – 29 November 2004), generally known as Jonah Jones, was born in County Durham, north east England, but known as a Welsh sculptor, writer and artist-craftsman. He worked in many media, but is especially remembered as a sculptor in stone, lettering-artist and calligrapher. He was also Director of the National College of Art and Design in Dublin for four years.

Upon leaving school in 1935 at the age of 16, Jones secured a post as assistant at the public library in Felling on Tyneside. The librarian, Mona Lovell, became a close friend and mentor to him, encouraging his cultural interests and introducing him to Quakerism (for a time he attended the Friends' meeting in Newcastle-upon-Tyne).

== Life ==
The eldest of four children, Jones was born in 1919 near Wardley, Gateshead. His father was a local man who had been a coalminer before being invalided in the First World War, his mother came from Yorkshire.

Registering in the Second World War as a conscientious objector, Jonah Jones was enlisted in the British Army as a non-combatant. He served in the Royal Army Medical Corps, 224 Parachute Field Ambulance, within the 6th Airborne Division, taking part in the Ardennes campaign and the airdrop over the Rhine at Wesel in March 1945. Together with the 1st Canadian Parachute Battalion, to which he was attached during operations, Jones was among the first Allied troops to enter Bergen-Belsen concentration camp on 15 April 1945. It was in the army that he gained the nickname "Jonah", which he would adopt when he embarked on his artistic career.

Jones served with 224 Parachute Field Ambulance in British Mandate Palestine from October 1945, transferring to the Army Education Corps in May 1946. While working at the army's Carmel College in Haifa, he met and married Judith Grossman, a local Jewish woman (later known in Wales as a writer under the name Judith Maro). They would go on to have two sons and a daughter.

Following demobilisation in 1947, Jones's career began in a shared practice with the artist John Petts at the Caseg Press in Llanystumdwy, North Wales, followed soon after by a short, intensive stay at the workshop of the late Eric Gill, where he learned the techniques of lettering and carving in stone.

During the 1950s Jones established a full-time workshop practice, one of the few who were able at that time in Wales to earn a living solely from art.

== Art ==
Jonah Jones worked in many media. He cut letters in slate, carved in stone and produced bronze busts. He taught himself both the traditional techniques of stained and leaded glass and the newer ones of concrete glass. He painted in watercolour, a medium in which he produced a distinctive body of work based on vernacular calligraphy, a technique in which the artist and poet David Jones was a major influence. He also produced two published novels, a book of largely autobiographical essays, an illustrated book about the lakes of North Wales, and a biography of Clough Williams-Ellis, the architect of Portmeirion.

In 1982 he spent a year at Gregynog Hall, working with Eric Gee and David Vickers on the book, Lament for Llewelyn the Last, for which he designed the title page. In later years the Gregynog Press commissioned several designs from him.

Stained glass by Jonah Jones in Ratcliffe College Chapel

Jonah Jones's major public commissions include work for the chapels of Ratcliffe College, Leicestershire; Ampleforth College, North Yorkshire; and Loyola Hall, Rainhill, Merseyside (now moved elsewhere); St Patrick's Church, Newport; the National Museum of Wales, Cardiff; Coleg Harlech, Gwynedd (now in storage awaiting relocation); and Mold Crown Court, Flintshire. His private work is marked by a preoccupation with Christian imagery and biblical themes (particularly that of Jacob), the Welsh mythological tales of the Mabinogion, the landscape of North Wales, and the Word.

Jones's Madonna and Child, Ampleforth Abbey in North Yorkshire

He found time, too, to work in the field of art education, acting as external assessor or examiner to many colleges of art throughout the UK from the 1960s to 1992. He served on the National Council for Diplomas in Art and Design, which reorganised the UK's art colleges into a decentralised system, from 1961 to 1971. For four years he was director of Dublin's National College of Art and Design, 1974–1978, when he was also a director of the Kilkenny Design Workshops.

He spent his last fourteen years in Llandaff, Cardiff, no longer able to do heavy sculpture, but still painting. His treatment of Welsh subject matter and working of Welsh-language texts were abiding themes throughout his half-century career in Wales.

He died on 29 November 2004, aged 85.

== Selected writings ==
- A Tree May Fall, Bodley Head, 1980, ISBN 0-370-30320-2
- The Lakes of North Wales, Whittet Books, 1983, ISBN 0-905483-54-5
- Zorn, William Heinemann Ltd, 1987, ISBN 0-434-37734-1
- The Gallipoli Diary, Seren Books/Poetry Wales Press Ltd, 1989, ISBN 1-85411-010-1
- Clough Williams-Ellis: Architect of Portmeirion, Seren Publishing/Poetry Wales Press Ltd, 1996, ISBN 1-85411-214-7
- Dear Mona: Letters from a Conscientious Objector, edited by Peter Jones, Seren Books/Poetry Wales Press Ltd, 2018, ISBN 978-1-78172-479-8
