= Queen Judith =

Queen Judith may refer to:

- Judith, Duchess of Bavaria (925 – June 29 soon after 985), daughter of Arnulf, Duke of Bavaria and Judith, married Henry I, Duke of Bavaria
- Judith of Bavaria (died 843) (805 - April 19 or 23, 843), daughter of Count of Welf and Hedwig, Duchess of Bavaria, became second wife of Louis the Pious
- Judith Premyslid (c. 1057–1086), daughter of Vratislaus II of Bohemia and Adelaide of Hungary, became second wife of Władysław I Herman
- Judith of Brittany (982 – 1017), daughter of Conan I of Rennes and Ermengarde of Anjou, Duchess of Brittany, married Richard II, Duke of Normandy
- Judith of Flanders (October 844 – 870), daughter of Charles the Bald and Ermentrude of Orléans, married Æthelwulf of Wessex
- Judith of Habsburg (1271 – May 21, 1297), daughter of Rudolph I of Germany and Gertrude of Hohenburg, married to Wenceslaus II of Bohemia
- Judith of Hungary (d.988), daughter of Géza of Hungary and Sarolt, married Bolesław I Chrobry
- Gudit, legendary queen of the Kingdom of Semien, sometimes referred to as Judith
- Judith of Schweinfurt (before 1003 – 2 August 1058), daughter of Henry, Margrave of Nordgau and Gertrude, married Bretislaus I, Duke of Bohemia
- Judith of Swabia (1047/1054–1093/1095), daughter of Henry III, Holy Roman Emperor and Agnes of Poitou, married Władysław I Herman, successor to Judith of Bohemia
- Judith of Thuringia (c. 1135 - d. 9 September after 1174), daughter of Louis I, Landgrave of Thuringia and Hedwig of Gudensberg, married Vladislaus II of Bohemia

== See also ==
- Judith (name)
