= Jude Tallichet =

American sculptor

Jude Tallichet (born 1954) is an American sculptor. She was born in Louisville, Kentucky and lives in Queens, New York. She attended the University of Montana. In 1990 she was the recipient of a MacDowell fellowship. Tallichet is a professor emeritus of the Tyler School of Art.

Tallichet's work is included in the permanent collections of the Denver Art Museum and the Phoenix Art Museum. Some of her exhibitions include exhibitions at Gund Gallery, Kenyon College, Gambier, OH (2012); Studio 10, Brooklyn, NY (2014); Smack Mellon, Brooklyn, NY (2020); FiveMyles Gallery, Brooklyn, NY (2021); and Catskill Art Space, Livingston Manor, NY (2023). Tallichet has also collaborated with musician Adam Brody to raise crickets for use both as art, in the form of "musical collaboration," as well as a source of protein.
