= Yehudit Kafri =

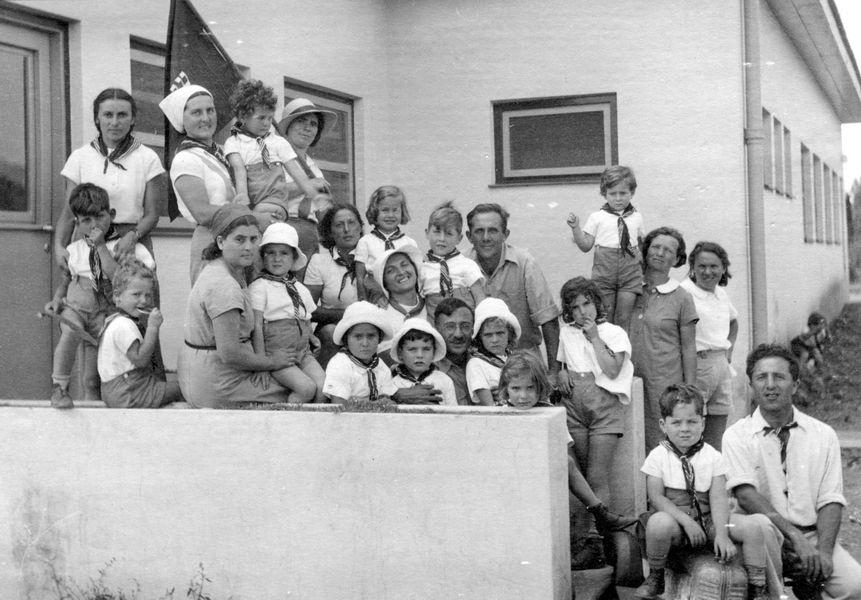
Yehudit Kafri in her youth in Ein HaHoresh

Yehudit Kafri Meiri (Hebrew: יהודית כפרי מאירי; born 1935) is a 20th–21st century Israeli poet and a writer, as well as editor and translator.

== Biography ==
She was born in 1935 and lived as a child in Kibbutz Ein HaHoresh, where her parents were founding members. Yehudit belonged to the first group of children born in this kibbutz.

After she got married, she moved to Kibbutz Sasa, where she wrote her first book, The Time Will Have Mercy (Hebrew: הזמן ירחם), which was published in 1962, one year after she moved to Kibbutz Shoval with her family. In Kibbutz Shoval she published a few more poetry books and children's books and made her first attempt at writing prose including a book describing her childhood memories, All The Summer We Went Barefoot (Hebrew: כל הקיץ הלכנו יחפים), which was successful and sold several editions.

Yehudit Kafri, mother of three and grandmother of four, has lived since 1989 with her husband in Mazkeret Batya, where she continues to write and publish books of poetry and biographies. In 2003 she published an historical biographic novel, Zosha from the Jezreel Valley to the Red Orchestra, which tells the life story of Zosha Poznanska, who was a member of the Red Orchestra and eventually killed by the Gestapo. This novel won The Best Literary Achievement of the Year Prize in Israel. It has since been translated and published in English, and in Polish, and lately in French.

== Bibliography ==
Poems by Yehudit Kafri were published in Hebrew, Arabic, English, Spanish, Croatian and Russian. Kafri has won several literary prizes including the Prime Minister's prize in 1987, and other scholarship prizes. Here are the judges reasons for handing out the prize for Zosha:

Following careful and extensive research, the author is displays courage as she copes with the main character, a heroine in the true classical sense. The author developed an intricate and gentle relationship with Zosha a member of the "Red Orchestra", whose life story she set out to tell. Using precise and reserved language Kafri records this relationship while keeping intellectual and emotional levels within appropriate boundaries vis-à-vis the horrific historical events she describes. Zosha is a historical novel bringing successfully the individual and emotional stories of the characters in the face of the larger story of the era. Kafri published 9 poetry books and 9 others (children's books, biographies, and prose).

=== Poetry ===
- Time Will Have Mercy, Makhbarot Lesifrut, 1962
- The spur of this moment, Sifriat Poalim, 1966
- From Here and From Another Country, S.P. 1970
- Small Variations, Hakibbutz Hameuchad, 1975
- Woman With Parasol, Gvanim, 1997
- Koranit, S.P. 1982
- Awn of Summer, S.P. 1988
- Man Woman Bird, Iaron Golan, 1993
- Zosha\Poems, Iton 77, 2006

=== Prose ===
- Mula Agin (Biography), Kibbutz Shoval, 1969
- To Love a bleu Whale (non fiction), Sifriat Poalim, 1982
- Avraham Zakai (Biography), the family, 1995
- All Summer We Walked Barefoot (memoir), Shdemot-Tag, 1996
- Sheindl (Biography), the family, 1997
- Zosha – From the Jezreel Valley to the Red Orchestra, Keter, 2003
- Yonatan, What will come of you! - The family, 2009

=== Children ===
- It was During Vacation (musicale for children), Sifriat Poalim, 1974
- Our Champion Tom, Sifriat Poalim, 1987

=== Translation ===
For Sifriat Poalim Publishing House – 14 psychological books. Among them: The Dynamic of Creation, by Anthony Storr (1972), 1983

=== Editing ===
For Sifriat Poalim and others – 12 books. Among them: Border Crossing – Poems from the Lebanon War, 1983
