= Jude Uzoma Ohaeri =

Nigerian professor of psychiatry

Jude Uzoma Ohaeri is a professor of Psychiatry at the University of Nigeria, Nsukka. He is a fellow of the Nigerian Academy of Science, elected into the Academy’s Fellowship at its Annual General Meeting held in January 2015.
