= Trevor Jude Smith =

American musician

Trevor Jude Smith is an American ukulele player sometimes associated with the New York Anti-folk scene. He has performed or recorded with dozens of independent and national artists including Major Matt Mason USA, Dufus, Rachel Trachtenburg, Toby Goodshank, and Amory Sivertson.
