= Chukwuemeka Jude Diji =

Nigerian mechanical engineer (born 1966)

- Born: 2 December 1966 (age 59); Nigeria
- Citizenship: Nigeria
- Occupation: Mechanical Engineer
- Years active: 1987–present
- Known for: Engineering
- Title: Deputy Vice Chancellor-RICE

Chukwuemeka Jude Diji born 2 December 1966, a Nigerian, Associate professor of Mechanical engineering and Deputy Vice Chancellor: Research, Innovation, Consultancy and Extension (DVC-RICE) for Kampala International University Uganda. He also served as the head of department Mechanical Engineering for the University of Ibadan Nigeria.

== Education ==
Chukwuemeka holds a Master of Science and PhD in Mechanical engineering from the University of Ibadan Nigeria in 1997 and 2008 receptively. He obtained his Bachelor of Science in Mechanical engineering from Obafemi Awolowo University formerly known as the University of Ife, in 1987.

== Career ==
During his early years, Prof chukwuemeka worked with a water drilling and prospecting company SOAG drilling company based in Ife Nigeria as a Mechanical engineer. He then went on to work as a production manager at Beta industries Nigeria limited, from 1989 to 1996. He worked as a factory manager with the Tolaram Clay Brick Industries in Ikorodu Lagos for three months before he joined university service.

Chukwuemeka joined University service as a lecturer in 1998 at the University of Ibadan under the department of Mechanical Engineering.

== Other activities ==
Chukwuemeka is a member of society at Solar Energy Society of Nigeria. He is also a member of the Nigerian Society of Engineers the Automobile Engineers's institute.
