= Judith Liberman =

French storyteller (born 1978)

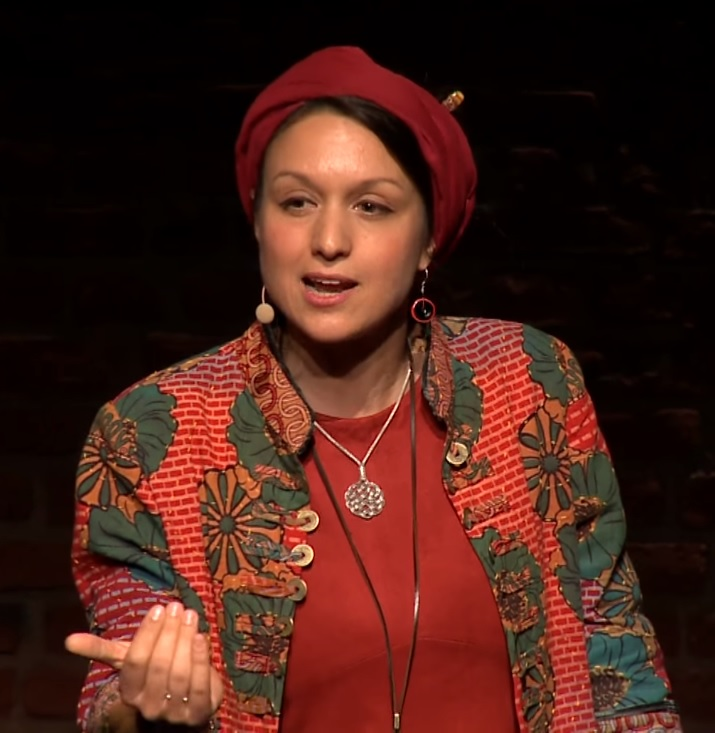
- Liberman at Zorlu Center PSM in 2017
- Born: Judith Malika Liberman; 1978 (age 47–48); Paris, France
- Education: Linguistics, acting, storytelling
- Alma mater: Sorbonne University; Pomona College; Conservatoire de Paris
- Occupations: Storyteller, writer

Judith Malika Liberman (born 1978) is a French storyteller, writer and teacher currently living in Turkey. When she was 14, she learned storytelling in a French commune and has gone on to reintroduce the telling of Anatolian fairy tales in Turkey.

== Early life and education ==
Judith Malika Liberman was born in Paris, France, in 1978. Her parents moved from the city to a rural area in the 1970s following the back-to-the-land movement. The family established a weaver commune. Liberman grew up in the commune, which was frequently visited by jugglers and storytellers who provided entertainment in rural areas. That era saw the revival of the storytelling tradition in France and Liberman's mother co-founded a storytelling society. In the commune, songs were sung and tales were told during evening gatherings by the fireplace. Liberman learned storytelling at the age of 14.

Liberman received a master's degree in linguistics at Sorbonne University in Paris. She studied acting at Pomona College in Claremont, California, United States, and took lessons in storytelling at the Conservatoire de Paris.

== Career ==
Liberman had plans to settle in the United States before she was appointed cultural attaché of France to Turkey in Ankara. She stayed in Turkey after completing her one-year duty.

She taught academic writing at Middle East Technical University in Ankara for seven years, followed by English at Koç University in Istanbul. A certified yoga teacher, she implements parts of her interest in storytelling in her practice. She had close connections to the Intangible Cultural Heritage Museum in Ankara. She worked with folklorists from Ankara's Gazi University and took part in various projects, conferences and festivals. She also trained storytellers in helping heal pediatric patients by using the oral narrative.

Liberman has given performances and seminars of fairy tale narration in many countries, including Turkey. Living in Turkey since 2004, she reintroduced the tradition of fairy tale narration in that country by teaching Anatolian fairy tales. Since 2014, she has presented a weekly radio program titled Masal Bu Ya ("This is the Tale") aired on NTV Radio. She gives night performances of storytelling with a different themes in the "Nazım Hikmet Cultural Center" in Şişli, Istanbul every month. She can narrate in a near-perfect Turkish accent. In March 2018, she presented Turkish traditional humorous fairy tales introducing Nasreddin Hodja at the Toronto International Storytelling Festival in Canada.

Liberman authored her first book, Masal Terapisi ("Storytelling Therapy"), in 2015. Two more books of hers, Masallarla Yola Çık ("The Journey Starts with a Tale") and Önce Hayal ("Imagination First"), followed in 2017 and 2019 respectively. She was also a consultor for the 2015 Turkish film Bir Varmış Bir Yokmuş ("Once Upon A Time").

== Works ==
- Liberman, Judith Malika (5 November 2015). Masal Terapi (in Turkish). Translated by Erdener, İstem (3rd ed.). Doğan Novus. p. 288. ISBN 978-605-092-535-7.
- Liberman, Judith Malika (13 October 2017). Masallarla Yola Çık (in Turkish). Translated by Subaşı Hill, Sibel (1st ed.). Hep Kitap. p. 336. ISBN 978-605-192-121-1.
- Liberman, Judith Malika (11 December 2019). Önce Hayal (in Turkish). Translated by Özatalay, Zeynep (1st ed.). Redhouse Kidz. p. 40. ISBN 978-605-207-977-5.
