= Yehuda Avidan =

Israeli official

- יהודה אבידן
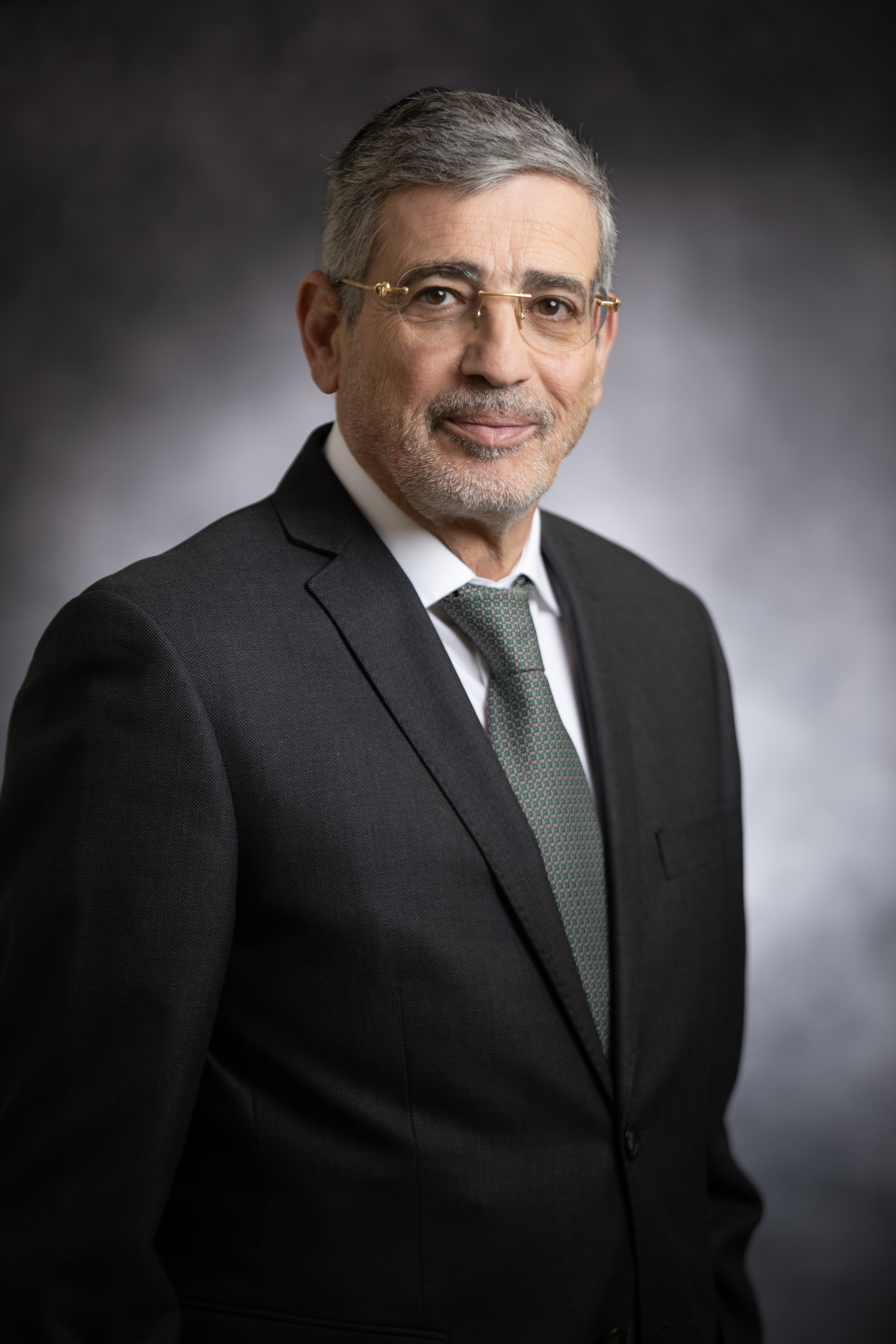
- May 2024
- Born: 1962 (age 63–64); Ramla, Israel
- Political party: Shas

Yehuda Avidan (Hebrew: יהודה אבידן) is an Israeli official and the Director-General of the Ministry of Religious Services.

He was previously Director-General of the Chief Rabbinate of Israel. He was the chief executive of the Ashdod Development Company from 2010 to 2019.
