= Judith (Vouet, Vienna) =

Painting attributed to Simon Vouet

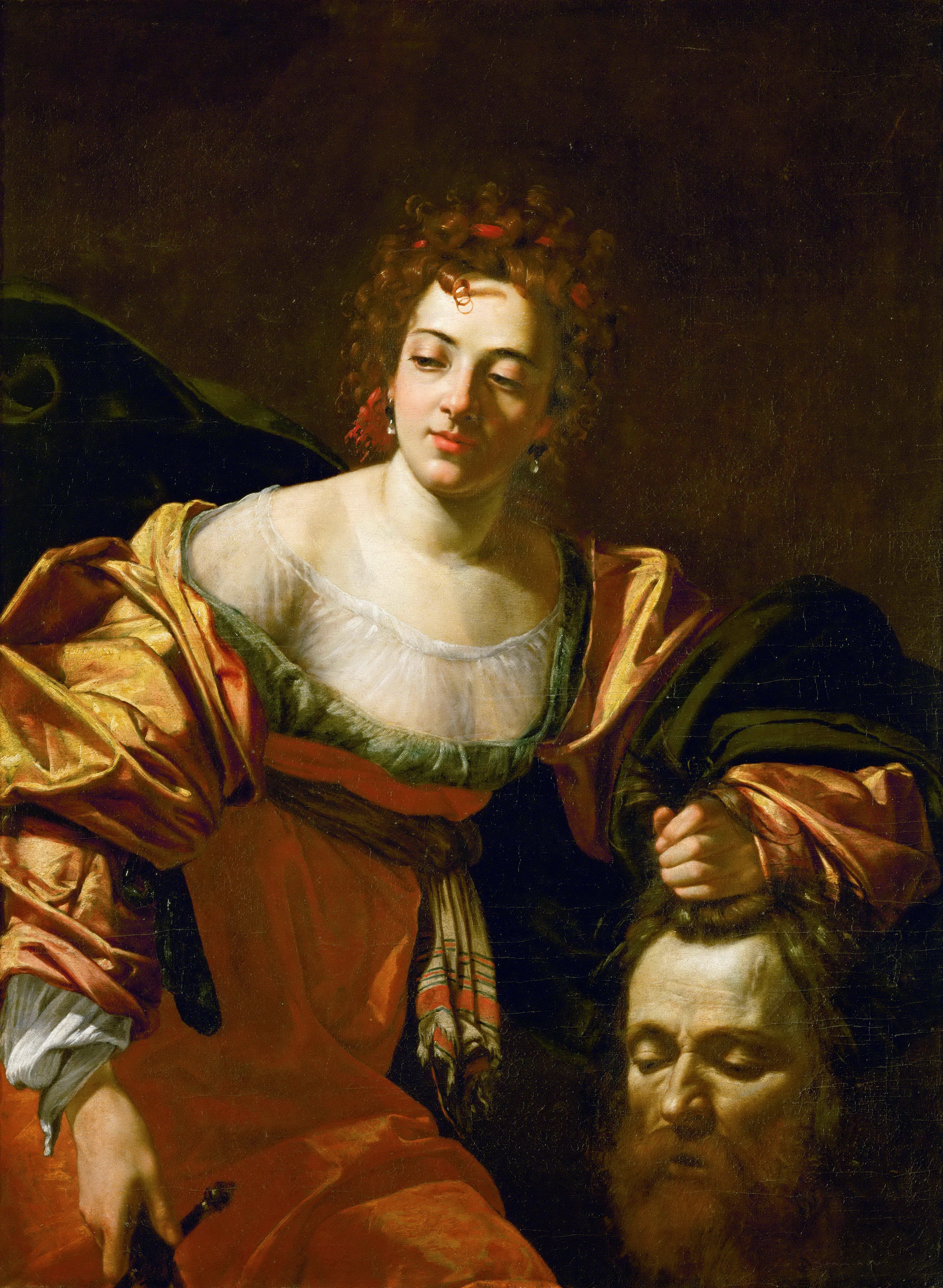
Judith (1620–1622) by Simon Vouet

Judith is an oil-on-canvas painting executed in 1620–1622 by Simon Vouet. It represents the Biblical Judith holding the severed head of Holofernes. The painting is held at the Kunsthistorisches Museum in Vienna.
