= Yehuda Hayuth =

Israeli geographer (1946–2022)

- יהודה חיות
- Born: 1946/04/10; Jerusalem, Mandatory Palestine
- Died: 2022/12/22; Haifa, Israel
- Burial place: Haifa, Israel
- Education: University of Haifa; the Hebrew University of Jerusalem; University of Washington (Ph.D. in ports and maritime transportation planning)
- Occupation: professor of geography
- Known for: President of the University of Haifa

Yehuda Hayuth (Hebrew: יהודה חיות; April 10, 1946 - December 20, 2022) was an Israeli professor of geography, and a former President of the University of Haifa.

== Early life ==
Hayuth was born in Jerusalem in Mandatory Palestine, and fought for Israel as a paratrooper in the battle for the Old City of Jerusalem in the Six Day War. He and his family later moved to the Haifa area.

== Education ==
He earned an undergraduate degree at the University of Haifa. He was a graduate student at the Hebrew University of Jerusalem. Hayuth then earned a Ph.D. in ports and maritime transportation planning at the University of Washington in Seattle, Washington.

== Academia ==
He then taught at the University of Rhode Island.

Hayuth has been a member of Haifa's Geography Department since the late 1970s. He became a full professor in 1994. He also was head of the university's Wydra Shipping and Aviation Research Institute. In 1992, he became Vice President for Administration; and in 1993 he became Acting President. He was elected President of the University of Haifa for the first time in February 1995, and then again in 1998.

Hayut died on December 20, 2022. He was married, and had two children.
