= Judith (Vouet, Munich) =

Painting by Simon Vouet

Judith with the Head of Holophernes
- Judith mit dem Haupt des Holofernes
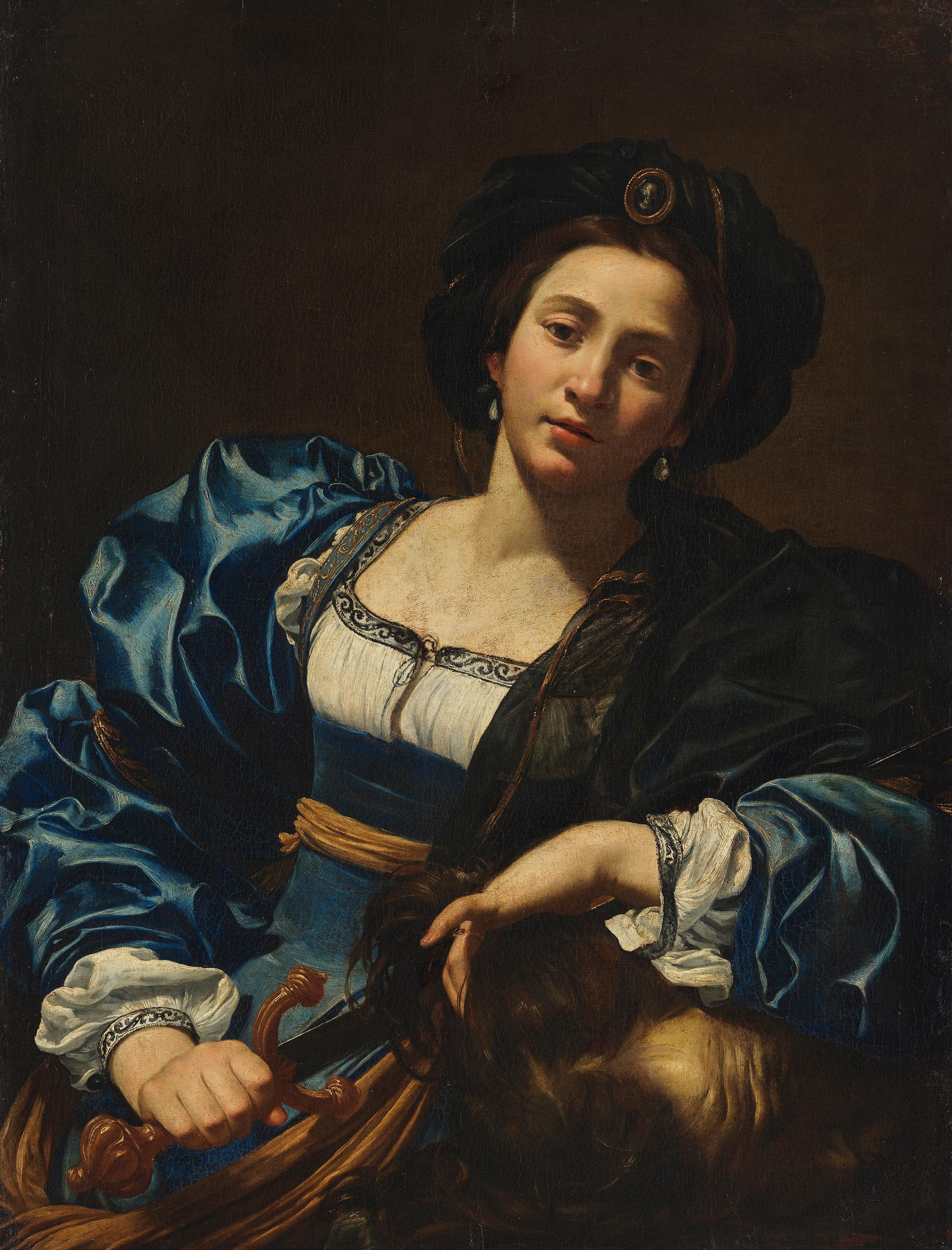
- Artist: Simon Vouet
- Year: 1620-1625
- Medium: Oil on canvas
- Dimensions: 97 cm (38 in) × 73.5 cm (28.9 in)
- Location: Alte Pinakothek
- Collection: Bavarian State Painting Collections
- Accession no.: 2279
- Identifiers: Bildindex der Kunst und Architektur ID: 00060283

Judith is an oil-on-canvas painting by Simon Vouet, executed c. 1620–1625. It depicts Judith, the leading character of the Book of Judith, holding the severed head of king Holofernes. She is shown finely dressed, holding her sword with her right hand, and showing the head of Holofernes at her left.

The painting is held at the Alte Pinakothek in Munich.
