= List of storms named Judith =

The name Judith has been used for four tropical cyclones worldwide: two in the Atlantic Ocean, one in the South-West Indian Ocean, one in the South Pacific Ocean, and one in the West Pacific Ocean.

In the Atlantic:

- Hurricane Judith (1959) – affected the western Caribbean and made landfall in Florida
- Tropical Storm Judith (1966) – formed north of Barbados and crossed through the Windward Islands

In the South-West Indian:

- Tropical Storm Martha–Judith (1966) – crossed over from the Australian region, remained over the open ocean

In the South Pacific:

- Cyclone Judith (1979) – Affected Vanuatu and New Caledonia

In the West Pacific:

- Typhoon Judith (1949) – brushed Okinawa and struck western Kyushu
