= Jude Lal Fernando =

Jude Lal Fernando is an associate professor, School of Religion, and coordinator of the M.Phil. in intercultural theology and interreligious studies in Irish School of Ecumenics in the Trinity College Dublin. He is the director of Trinity Centre for Post-Conflict Justice. He is a human rights activist and opposed the War against Sri Lankan Tamils. In 2025, he was made a fellow of Trinity College Dublin.
