= Judith Weinstock =

Israeli author (born 1940)

- יהודית וינשטוק
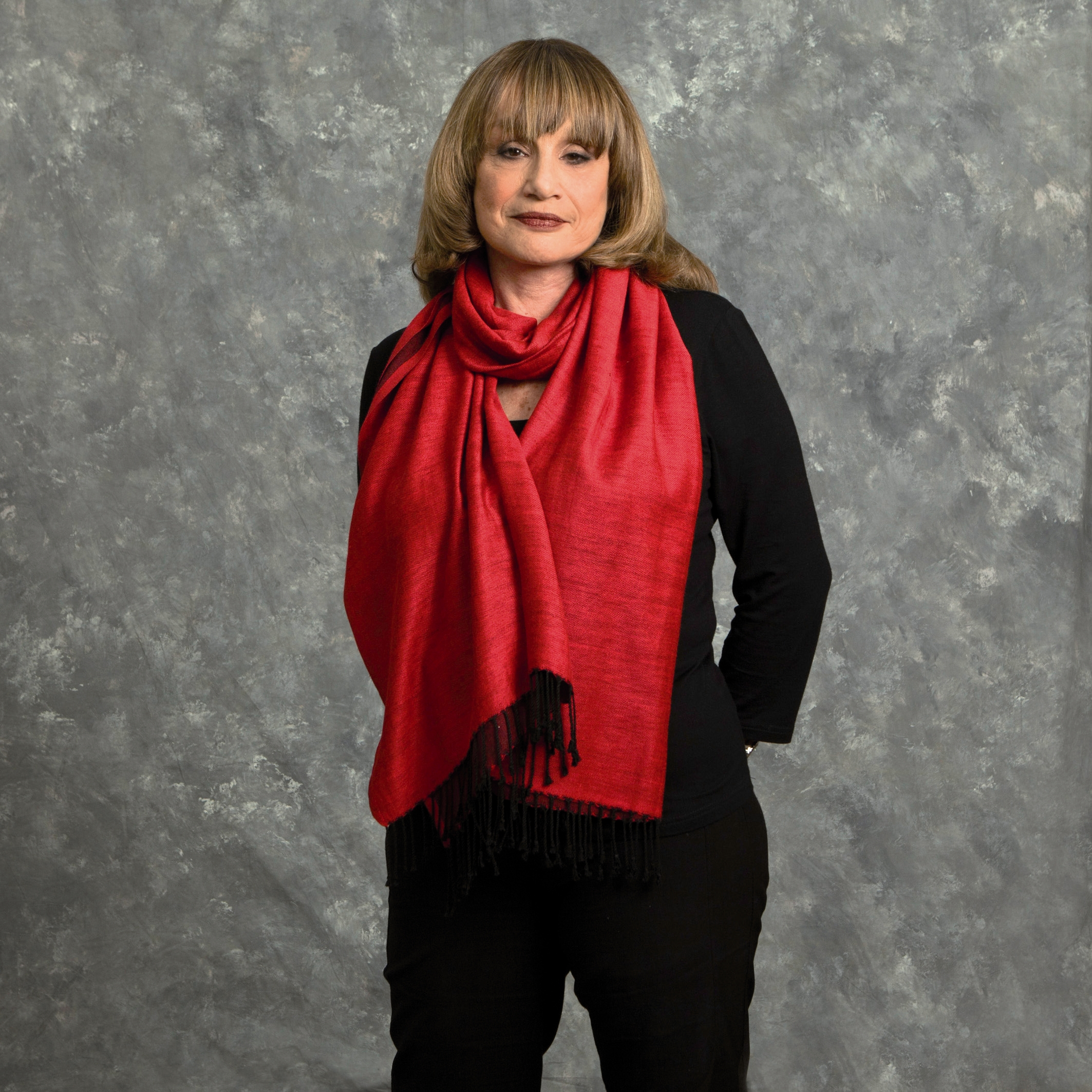
- Born: 1940 (age 85–86)

Judith (Yehudit) Weinstock (Hebrew: יהודית ויינשטוק; born 1940) is an Israeli author.

== Biography ==
Judith Weinstock is the eldest daughter of Chana and Chaim Zissowitz, and has a brother and a sister. Her parents immigrated for Zionist reasons in the mid-nineteen thirties, and were among the founders of the religious kibbutz of Be'erot Yitzhak. At the age of six, Judith moved with her family to the moshava of Pardes Hanna, where she grew up. Her father was an activist for the Hapoel HaMizrachi national religious party, and served as vice chairman of the municipality and chairman of its employment office. Weinstock studied preschool education at Tel Aviv's Talpiot College. She holds a BA in preschool education and in education management from Bar-Ilan University.

Weinstock worked in preschool education for nearly four decades: first as a kindergarten teacher, and later as a kindergarten teacher’s instructor, a kindergarten superintendent, and an executive member of the Central District at the Ministry of Education. In this capacity, she wrote and instituted curricula for public and public-religious kindergartens.

After her retirement in 2002, she embarked on her literary work. She wrote short stories that were published in Maariv, Yedioth Ahronoth, Ha'ir, and Makor Rishon. Her books, the short story anthology 'Who by fire', and the novel 'A Woman Like Her', were published by Kinneret Zmora-Bitan Dvir.

Judith Weinstock is married to Ben-Zion Weinstock, a former insurance professional, founder and first chairman of the Shomra insurance company, and today owner of a real estate firm. They reside in Petah Tikva.

Weinstock is a mother of four: Yossi Weinstock, former CEO of Shomra insurance company and now an entrepreneur; Shai Kerem (Weinstock), a journalist and Dana International's manager-producer; Alon Weinstock, a documentary filmmaker; and Tami Pat-Weinstock, a nurse.

== Literary works ==
Who by fire, Kinneret Zmora-Bitan Dvir, ed. Maya Dvash, 2011

An anthology of short stories tracing the lives of the figures comprising the tapestry of Israeli society in general, and of national-religious society in particular, set against life in the state of Israel during its founding, its formation, and up to the present-day of the second millennium.

The stories are written from within present-day life, but look back to what was, and at dealing with the changes, cracks, and rifts that form and widen with time. Among other subjects, the book deals with couples, parent-child relationships, friendship, interaction between religious and secular people, mourning, troubled childhood experiences, relationships between old and new immigrants in the moshava, disparities in Israeli society, life in the settlements, and ideologies and their actualization.

Ran Ben Nun, Yedioth Ahronoth:

“Who by fire… is a surprisingly interesting anthology, first because of the author's unique style: the sentences are brief and telegraphic, the phrases are creative and unusual, and the events too come from some unfamiliar twilight land, where everything happens differently, even love stories and relationships of the sort you’d expect to find in any literary genre. Weinstock’s stories have a different flavor, which doesn’t suit every palate, but which is worth sampling, even a bit.”

A Woman Like Her, Kineret Zmora-Bitan, ed. Tamar Bialik, 2013

Nima Zissman is a charismatic spiritual leader who returns people to religion (teshuvah). One day, she suddenly disappears, leaving behind many questions, rumors, and ever-multiplying doubts. The story is told in the first person by her girlhood friend Leah, who reads her journals, while also recounting girlhood friendship as a complex relationship with its ups and downs through the years. Through the journals, Zissman’s story is uncovered and shown in a different light, revealing added layers, secrets, missed opportunities, and a double life, all of which recasts Nima’s story.

From Israel Hayom:

“The protagonist's unusual story serves Weinstock as a springboard for pointedly and ironically discussing the dilemmas of the national-religious world, caught as it is between the Orthodox and secular worlds, and allows her to review its complexities and weaknesses by discussing passion – not the commonest of concepts in this particular society. The achievement of A Woman Like Her lies in presenting the dilemmas of national-religious women accessibly, in a way that highlights the differences typical of their world together with their dilemmas.”

Carnivorous plants, Kineret Zmora-Bitan, ed. Tamar Bialik, 2018

== Short stories published in the printed press ==
- "Jam Water", Maariv weekend supplement, January 17, 2003
- "Solo", Maariv weekend supplement, March 19, 2008
- "And I Saw a Cypress", Makor Rishon's Profile supplement, September 11, 2009
- "Second Chance", Makor Rishon's Profile supplement, January 29, 2009
- "Class Reunion", Makor Rishon's Profile supplement, July 19, 2010
- "A Country House", Makor Rishon's women's magazine, August 15, 2008
- "Days of Awe", Makor Rishon's women's magazine, September 26, 2008
- "Miss Miltz of Ein Gev", Makor Rishon's women's magazine, May 25, 2008
- "The Woman of Oz", Makor Rishon's women's magazine, February 27, 2009
- "About a Jealousy", Makor Rishon's women's magazine, November 21, 2008
- "How Miss Rachel Teaches the Children", Makor Rishon's women's magazine, December 19, 2008
- "A Kibbutz Funeral", Makor Rishon's Profile supplement, December 30, 2011
- "The Day Khodorov Died", Makor Rishon's women's magazine, February 23, 2007
- "Now You Go Back", Makor Rishon's women's magazine, February 22, 2008
- "Israelis", Ha'ir, June 24, 2006
