= Judith Maro =

Israeli-Welsh writer

- יהודית מארו
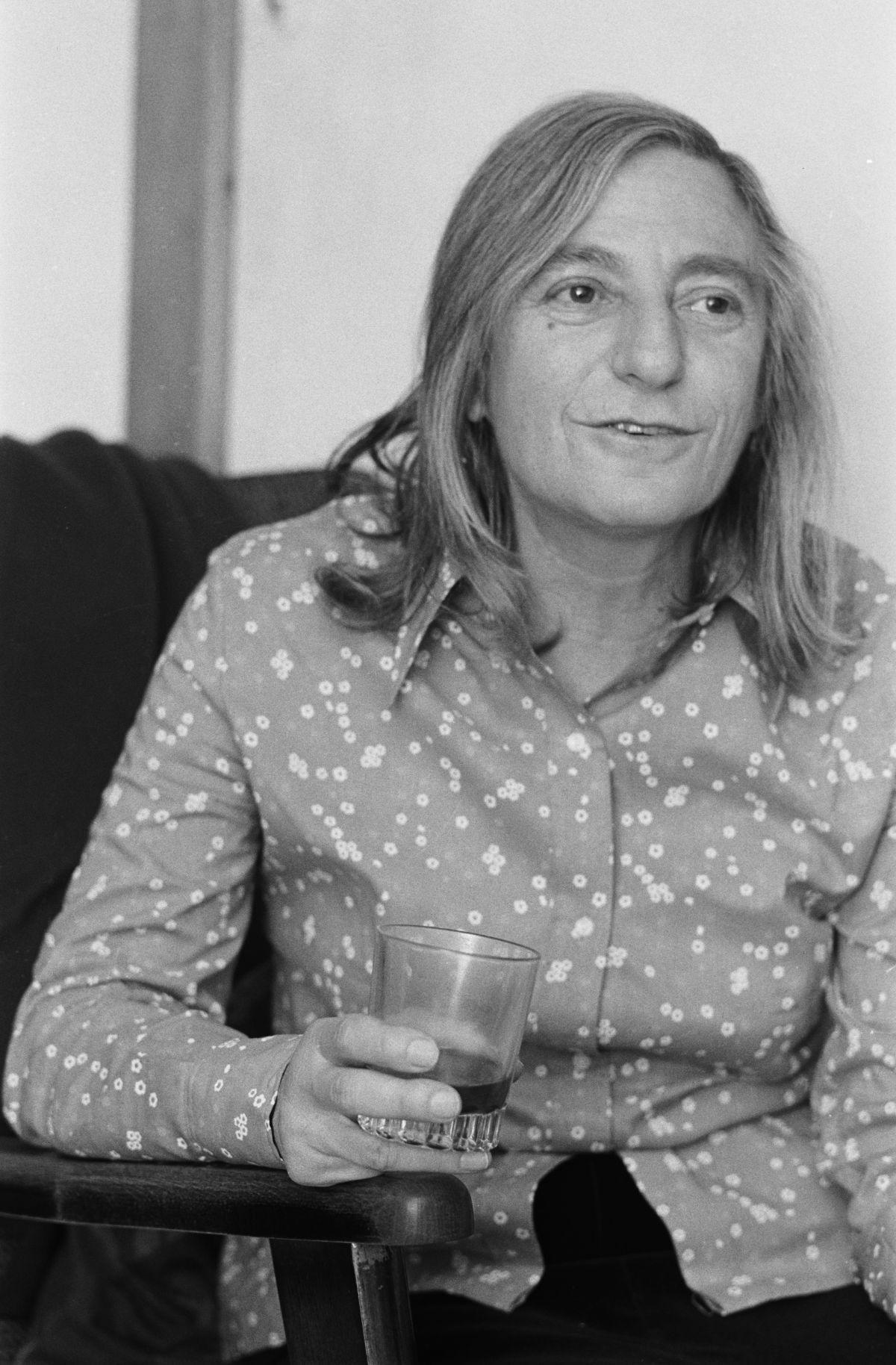
- Born: Ida Yehudit Anastatia Grossman; 24 November 1919; Yekaterinoslav, Yekaterinoslav Governorate, Ukraine
- Died: 16 November 2011 (aged 91); Swansea, Glamorganshire, Wales
- Education: Hebrew Reali School
- Alma mater: Hebrew University of Jerusalem
- Occupation: Writer
- Spouse: Jonah Jones (m. 1946; died 2004)
- Children: 3
- Writing career
- Language: English, Welsh
- Years active: 1971–2009

Judith Maro (Hebrew: יהודית מארו; born Ida Yehudit Anastasia Grossman; 24 November 1919 – 16 November 2011) was an Israeli-Welsh writer who published her works in English and Welsh. She was born in Yekaterinoslav (current Dnipro, Ukraine), and raised in Haifa. She was educated at the Hebrew Reali School and joined both the paramilitary organization Haganah and the political organization Hashomer Hatzair in her youth. During World War II, Maro joined the Auxiliary Territorial Service. Maro served as an officer in the Palmach during the 1947–1949 Palestine war, before moving to the United Kingdom in 1947. She moved to Wales in 1949 and became immersed in its culture. During her career, Maro published an autobiography, wrote novels and made a compilation of a number of English and Welsh Publications. She also worked for the British printed press, and for the BBC World Service.

== Early life ==
She was born Ida Yehudit Anastasia Grossman on 24 November 1919 in Yekaterinoslav, Ukraine. She was raised in Haifa, Mandatory Palestine and in a non-religious family; she was encouraged to read the Bible to learn about the history of her people. Her father was a professor of mathematics at Technion – Israel Institute of Technology. She spoke five languages and read the works of Lion Feuchtwanger and Stefan Zweig by the age of seven.

== Military service ==
Attending the Hebrew Reali School, in the montessori education system, Maro found and read documents relating to the paramilitary organisation Haganah and was subsequently sworn as a member of it. She learnt morse code during the 1936–1939 Arab revolt in Palestine and taught the language to others to defend themselves against the Kaukaji. Maro joined the Marxist youth movement Hashomer Hatzair at age 16 and the Auxiliary Territorial Service (ATS) during the Second World War. She enrolled on a law course at the Hebrew University of Jerusalem before switching to Eastern Studies. After the War, she was dismissed from the ATS and helped to bring Jews who had fled from Nazi camps to her homeland.

At Mount Carmel College of the British Army Maro met the Welsh soldier and sculptor Jonah Jones and the two married without official permission in 1946. They would go on to have three children and multiple grandchildren. In the meantime, she served as an officer in the Palmach (Haganah's commando wing) in the Galilee during the 1947–1949 Palestine war. Maro's time in the ATS, marriage to a British Army soldier and racial conflict prompted her and her husband to leave for the United Kingdom in June 1947.

== Career ==
The couple lived on Tyneside, before moving to the Llŷn Peninsula in North West Wales in 1949. She taught Hebrew to immigrants in the early years of Israel during the early 1950s.

In Wales, Maro immersed herself in the country's culture and identified with it, and learnt Welsh. She found the landscape of Snowdonia similar to that of her homeland in Biblical toponymy. She assumed the pen name Judith Maro and converted to the Roman Catholic faith. She began writing in Welsh and insisted that all of her works must be translated into the language before appearing in English. In 1971, she wrote about Hebrew in Adfer yr Hebraeg (The Revival of Hebrew). Maro wrote her autobiography Atgofion Haganah (English: Haganah Memories) in 1972, and remembered her experiences of Wales in the novel Y Porth nid ''n Angof (later republished as The Remembered Gate) in 1974. That same year, Maro published a collection of English publications and Welsh periodicals from 1959 to 1974 on the similarities between Israel and Wales and called it Hen Wlad Newydd.

She also wrote articles and reviews for Jewish Quarterly, worked with various broadsheet newspapers published in the United Kingdom and broadcast for the BBC World Service. In 1986, Maro wrote the novel Y Carlwm, which was translated into English as The Stoat by Y Lolfa in 2009, in response to the Gaza War. The novel was positively received by WalesOnline. Extracts from her work were published in an anthology called The Chosen People: Wales and the Jews that was compiled by Grahame Davies in 2002.

== Death ==
Maro died on 16 November 2011 in Swansea. Her husband predeceased her in 2004; Maro was given a funeral at Our Lady Star of the Sea Roman Catholic Church in Mumbles on 1 December.

== Personality ==
According to Meic Stephens in her obituary in The Independent, Maro was "a restless, vivacious woman who liked nothing better than an argument" and someone who liked to discuss Israeli and Welsh politics. A committed Zionist, she thought independently and challenged and questioned spirit. Maro's fluency in the Hebrew language caused her to feel an affinity with minority languages such as Welsh. She said that it would be "monstrous for me to see the old language disappear to the modern age's bowels of uniformity."
