= Jude Cowan Montague =

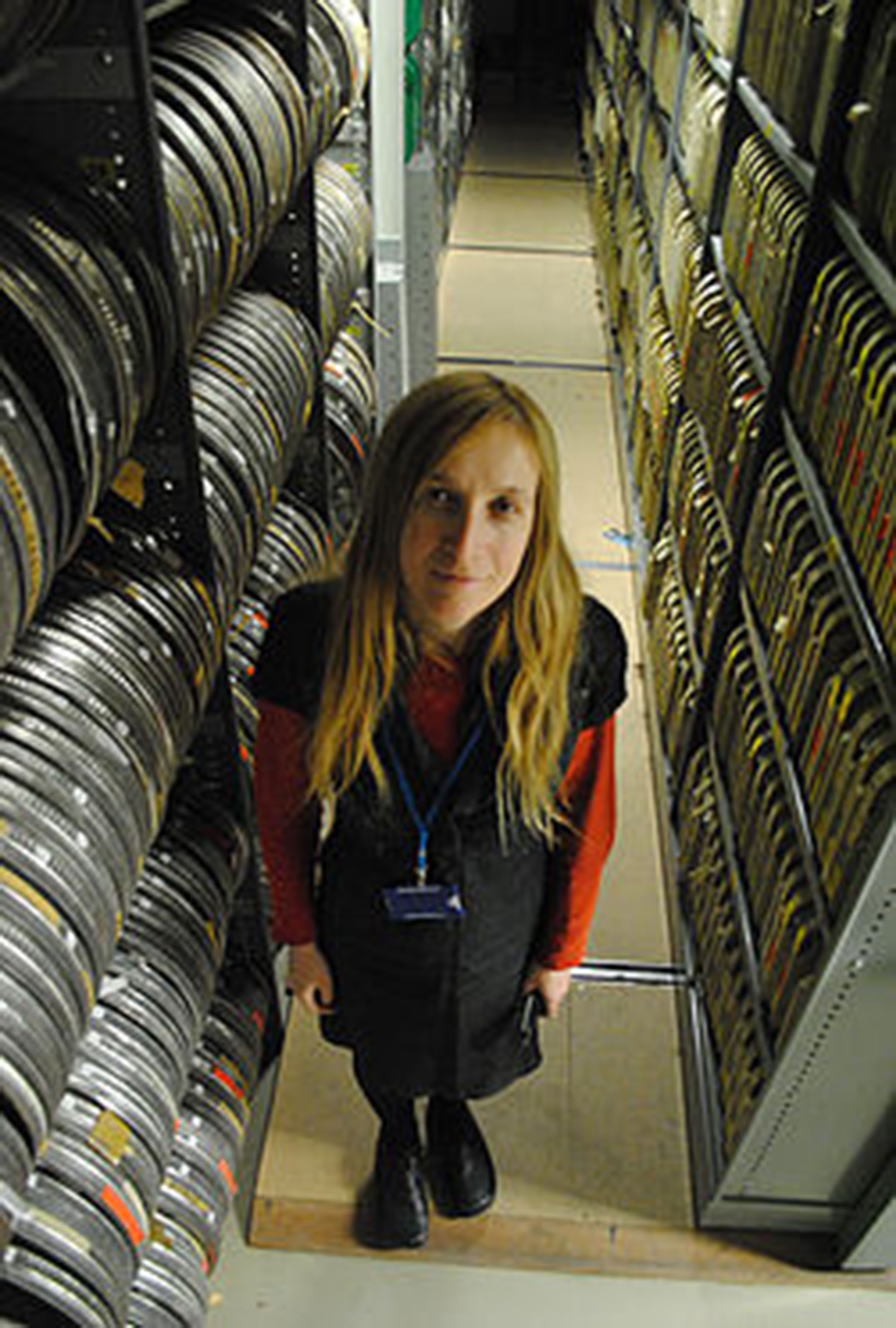
- Cowan Montague in the film vaults at Grays Inn Road while working for ITN/Reuters

Background information
- Born: Crumpsall, Manchester, England
- Occupations: Artist; writer; composer; songwriter; broadcaster
- Instruments: Voice; synth; guitar
- Website: judecowanmontague.com

Jude Cowan Montague is an artist, writer, composer, film historian, poet and broadcaster. She was born in Manchester, grew up in Bolton and has lived and worked in London. She has Scottish, Irish and Baltic heritage.

== Education ==
Cowan Montague graduated with a first from St Edmund Hall, Oxford University. She has a PhD In Film History and in 2013 acquired an MA in Fine Art from Camberwell School of Arts (now known as Camberwell College of Arts).

== Music ==
Cowan Montague is a controversial songwriter, whose work divides critics. Her folk-cabaret album Doodlebug Alley was described as having 'a Marmite-like quality - you'll either love it or hate it'. She has released various LPs on Richard Sanderson's Linear Obsessional label. The second, 'Winter Hill Sings' was the first physical release of the cult netlabel and sold out straight away. In 2015 Disco Fair and Folkwit Records co-released the LP 'The Leidenfrost Effect' by Jude C. Montague and the Dutch composer and producer Wim Oudijk, a record praised by one music journalist as 'compulsive listening' while also describing it as 'wilfully idiosyncratic and determinedly strange'. Her one-woman theatre shows utilize simple musical features.

== Broadcasting ==
She is the creator and host of 'The News Agents' a weekly show on Resonance FM whose tagline was'where news meets arts'. The show began to air in January 2014, going out weekly on Saturdays from 2:30pm to 3:30pm GMT/BST. The show is creative and new work is produced in the studio for the show, usually live. One of the resulting pieces by a guest artist is Bruce Hamilton's 'Hennecker's Ditch Fantasy' an acousmatic text-sound composition based on a poem by Katharine Kilalea. Cowan Montague won the inaugural John Turner Prize with her essay 'Women at Work for War! Women at Work for the things of Peace'. The work considers the representation of women in the British propaganda newsreel, Indian News Parade, which ran in India from 1943 to 1946. While working as an archivist for Reuters Television News she began to write poetry and her first collection of poems about international news agency stories in 2008 was the subject of an interview with anchorman Jon Snow for a Reuters Television News report in 2011.

== Poetry ==
Her first collection of poems, 'For the Messengers' (Donut Press, 2011) was conceived and written while working for the Thomson Reuters news agency as an archivist. In her preface she wrote 'My daily viewing now included content such as the immediate aftermath of disasters and bombings ... It felt a natural step to try to process my response to this work by writing; and poetry, for me, was the best medium. My writing quickly became a habit, almost a compulsion, quite possibly a therapy.' Her second collection of prints and poems is about a visit to a Mauritian family in Port Louis, 'The Groodoyals of Terre Rouge' has been summarized as 'a colourful travelogue' and extracts of prints and poems featured as a mini project in the art blog 'Very Small Kitchen'. She has had work published in poetry magazines internationally and is currently editing an anthology of news poetry.

== Art ==
Cowan Montague is a graduate of the Camberwell School of Arts and winner of the Gwen May RE Award from the Royal Society of Painter-Printmakers in 2013. She creates large intaglio based monoprints. She says, 'I create worlds in which the viewer's imagination can roam; floating characters through my landscapes carry out secretive and subversive actions.' She exhibits internationally and in London's underground art community and is a featured artist with Lab451London.

== Bibliography ==
- The Originals, Hesterglock Press, 2017 ISBN 978-0-244-90036-6
- The Wires, 2012, Wisdom's Bottom Press, 2016 ISBN 978-0-9935502-1-8
- The Groodoyals of Terre Rouge, Dark Windows Press, 2013 ISBN 978-0-9571644-8-2
- For the Messengers, Donut Press, 2011 ISBN 9780956644510

== Discography ==
- To India (2018, LP, Mottingham Records)
- Montague Armstrong, Hammond Hits (2018, LP, Linear Obsessional)
- #1 Caretaker of Animals around the World (2016, LP, Hardy Cuttings)
- The Leidenfrost Effect (2015, LP, Folkwit Records)
- Cairo Compression (2015, LP, Linear Obsessional)
- Winter Hill Sings (2013, EP, Linear Obsessional)
- Barbie and Ken (2013, EP, Folkwit Records)
- Bukittinggi Tales (2011, EP, Linear Obsessional)
- Lamb & Tyger (2011, LP, Ah Sunflower!)
- Doodlebug Alley (2010, LP, Jude Cowan)
- To America (2000, LP, Jude Cowan)

== Other works ==
- Springfield Olympics, E-magazine 2012
