= R. Jude Samulski =

American geneticist

- Born: Richard Jude Samulski; 1954 (age 71–72)
- Citizenship: United States
- Education: Ph.D. University of Florida; B.S. Clemson University
- Known for: Adeno-associated virus vectors
- Scientific career
- Fields: Gene Therapy, Molecular Biology, Molecular Virology, Pharmacology
- Workplaces: Director, UNC Gene Therapy Center

Richard Jude Samulski (born 1954) is an American scientist, inventor, and academic recognized for his pioneering work in gene therapy and adeno-associated virus vectors (AAV) in the fields of molecular virology and pharmacology.

Samulski is the former director of the UNC Gene Therapy Center and a member of the UNC Lineberger Comprehensive Cancer Center.

== Education ==
Samulski earned his Ph.D. at the University of Florida in 1982 and his B.S. at Clemson University in 1976. He was president of the American Society of Gene & Cell Therapy in 2011. His contributions to scientific literature include 208 academic publications, and 408 research items, broadly cited by their scholarly discipline with 3,158 patent citations and 17,140 scholarly citations.

== Work ==
He co-founded biotechnology companies active in gene therapy and AAV commercialization, including AskBio (Asklepios BioPharmaceutical Inc.), a biotechnology company focused on AAV gene therapy, NanoCor Therapeutics, Inc. Chatham Therapeutics, Inc. and Bamboo Therapeutics, Inc, spinoffs from Asklepios BioPharmaceutical Inc. He was the director of the UNC School of Medicine Gene Therapy Center in Chapel Hill, North Carolina until 2016.

== AAV research ==
Samulski's research has focused on the study of the human non-pathogenic parvovirus adeno-associated virus (AAV) and its use in gene therapies. In the 1980s, as a graduate student, he pioneered the use of AAV as a vector for therapeutic genes. In 1984, he cloned the virus DNA into a bacterial plasmid. This led to the recognition of the potential of AAV and also formed the foundation for the two current FDA-approved AAV gene therapies. His work demonstrated AAV2 as a viral vector for gene therapy which led to the first U.S. Patent for inserting genes into AAV. This technique has been used in gene therapy clinical trials for cystic fibrosis, Duchenne muscular dystrophy, haemophilia and Parkinson's disease, and the foundation for gene therapy research and development in the bioscience industry and academic institutions such as UNC. In 2016, Pfizer acquired his company, Bamboo Therapeutics, and in 2014, Baxter International acquired Chatham Therapeutics and programs developed by AskBio.

== Awards and recognition ==
In 2008, Samulski was the first person to receive the Outstanding Achievement Award by the American Society of Gene and Cell Therapy, which recognized his lifetime of significant scientific contributions to the field of gene therapy. He holds 98 U.S. and foreign patents and has also been recognized as a co-inventor on other patents, all of which are related to gene delivery associated with adeno-associated virus vectors.
