= Sir Jude Ejiogu =

Nigerian politician

Personal details
- Born: Jude Ejiogu Imo State, Nigeria
- Party: All Progressives Congress (APC)

Sir Jude Ejiogu // is a Nigerian politician from Imo state, Nigeria. He was a former Secretary to Imo State Government and former chief of staff to the governor of Imo State.

== Background ==
Ejiogu is an Igbo, born into a catholic family in Emekuku, Owerri Imo State. He is also a one time chairman of the Local Government Civil Service Commission in Imo.
