= Judith Nicosia =

American singer

Judith Nicosia is a soprano who is based in New Jersey. Winner of the soprano competition at the Paris International Voice Competition in 1972, she had her Carnegie Hall debut in 1981. A graduate of Ithaca College, Nicosia is currently a professor of voice in the Mason Gross School of the Arts at Rutgers University and tours widely as a classical soloist.
