= Judy (given name) =

Judy is a (usually) female personal name. It is sometimes a given name, but more often it is a hypocorism (affectionate diminutive of a personal name) which takes the place of a given name, usually Judith. Jude is another occasionally used short form of the name.

== People ==
=== Politics ===
- Judy Agnew, wife of former American Vice President of the United States Spiro Agnew
- Judy Baker (born 1960), American politician
- Judy Bethel (1943–2025), Canadian politician
- Judy Biggert (born 1937), American politician
- Judy Bonds (1952–2011), American anti-mountaintop-removal activist
- Judy Boyle, American politician
- Judy Bradley (born 1952), Canadian politician
- Judy Burges (born 1943), American politician
- Judy Chirco, American politician
- Judy Chu (born 1953), American politician
- Judy Clibborn, American politician
- Judy Darcy (born 1950), Canadian politician and national union executive
- Judy Edwards (born 1955), Australian politician
- Judy Emmons, American politician
- Judy Erola (born 1934), Canadian politician
- Judy Foote (born 1952), Canadian politician
- Judy Fryd (1909–2000), British advocate for mentally handicapped children
- Judy Gamin (1930–2022), Australian politician
- Judy Gingell (born 1946), Canadian politician
- Judy Goldsmith, American activist and President of NOW
- Judy Gordon (1948–2020), Canadian politician
- Judy Hopwood (born 1954), Australian politician
- Judy Hughes (born 1959), Australian politician
- Judy Jackson (born 1947), Australian politician
- Judy Junor (born 1948), Canadian politician
- Judy Kany (born 1937), American politician
- Judy Keall (born 1942), New Zealand politician
- Judy Koehler (born 1941), American politician
- Judy Krawczyk (born 1939), American politician
- Judy LaMarsh (1924–1980), Canadian politician, member of the federal cabinet, and author
- Judy Lee (born 1942), American politician
- Judy Maddigan (born 1948), Australian politician
- Judy Mallaber (born 1951), British politician
- Judy Manning (1942–2025), American politician
- Judy Manning, Canadian politician
- Judy Martin (politician)
- Judy Marsales, Canadian politician
- Judy Martz (1943–2017), American skater politician, and Governor of Montana
- Judy Mbugua (born 1947), Kenyan activist
- Judy Mundey (born 1944), Canadian activist and communist
- Judy Eason McIntyre (born 1945), American politician
- Judy Nerat (1948–2012), American politician
- Judy Olson Duhamel (born 1939), American politician and educator
- Judy Paradis (born 1944), American politician
- Judy Rebick (born 1945), Canadian activist and journalist
- Judy Richardson, American activist and documentary film producer
- Judy Robson (born 1939), American politician
- Judy Rogers, Canadian politician
- Judy Schwank (born 1951), American politician
- Judy Sgro (born 1944), Canadian politician
- Judy Sheerer (1940–2016), American politician
- Judy Shepard (born 1952), American activist
- Judy Spence (born 1957), Australian politician
- Judy Streatch (born 1966), Canadian politician
- Judy Syjuco, Filipino politician
- Judy Thongori (c. 1965–2025), Kenyan women's rights activist
- Judy Baar Topinka (1944–2014), American politician
- Judy Turner (born 1956), New Zealand politician
- Judy Wakhungu, Kenyan cabinet minister, executive, and academic
- Judy Wasylycia-Leis (born 1951), Canadian politician
- Judy Petty Wolf, American politician

=== Entertainment ===
- Judy Bailey (born 1953), New Zealand broadcaster
- Judy Bailey (pianist) (1935–2025), New Zealand jazz pianist
- Judy Banks Australian television host
- Judy Becker, American film production designer
- Judy Bennett (born 1943), English voice actor
- Judy Blair (born 1948), Franco-American jazz and R&B singer and keyboardist
- Judy Boucher, Vincentian reggae and R&B singer
- Judy Brooke (born 1970), English actress
- Judy Buxton (born 1949), English actress
- Judy Campbell (1916–2004), British actress and cabaret singer
- Judy Canova (1913–1983), American comedian, actress, pop singer, and radio personality
- Judy Carmichael (born 1957), American jazz vocalist and pianist
- Judy Carne (1939–2015), English actress
- Judy Chamberlain (born 1944), American singer
- Judy Cheeks (1954–2025), American soul and R&B singer
- Judy Clark (1921–2002), American actress
- Judy Clay (1938–2001), American soul and gospel singer
- Judy Collins (born 1939), American folk, popular, and art singer
- Judy Cornwell (born 1940), English actress
- Judy Craig (born 1946), American girl-group singer
- Judy Craymer, English musical theater producer
- Judy Dan (born 1930), Chinese-American actress
- Judy Davis (born 1955), Australian actress
- Judy Dearing (1940–1995) American costume designer
- Judy Dyble (1949–2020), British singer–songwriter
- Judy Farr (set decorator), British
- Judy Farrell (1938–2023), American actress
- Judy Finnigan (born 1948), English television personality and author
- Judy Flynn (born c. 1963–1964), British actress
- Judy Freudberg (1949–2012), American television screenwriter
- Judy Garland (1922–1969), American pop singer and actress
- Judy Adelman Gershon of Canadian children's music duo Judy & David
- Judy Gold (born 1962), American comedian, actress, screenwriter, and producer
- Judy Graubart (born 1943), American actress
- Judy Geeson (born 1948), English actress
- Judy Gilroy, Irish television presenter
- Judy Greer (born 1975), American actress
- Judy Gringer (born 1941), Danish actress
- Judy Gunn (1915–1991), British actress
- Judy Henske (1936–2022), American singer–songwriter
- Judy Herrera, American actress
- Judy Holliday (1921–1965), American actress, comedian, and pop singer
- Judy Holt, British actress
- Judy Huxtable (born 1942), English actress
- Judy Jack, Australian TV host of The Judy Jack Show and Geoff and Judy
- Judy Jacobs (born 1957), American gospel musician
- Judy Johnson (1924–2025), American pop singer
- Judy Kaye (born 1948), American singer and actress
- Judy Kelly (1913–1991), Australian-British actress
- Judy Kuhn (born 1958), American actress and singer
- Judy Landers (born 1958), American actress
- Judy Landon, American actress
- Judy Lewis (1935–2011), American Hollywood lovechild and actress
- Judy Loe (1947–2025), English actress
- Judy Lynn (1936–2010), American singer and Miss Idaho 1955
- Judy Lynne (born 1943), American-Australian actress
- Judy Malcolm (1910–1998), American actress
- Judy Marte (born 1983), American actress
- Judy Martin (1917–1951), American country music singer
- Judy Matheson, British actress
- Judy McBurney (1948–2018), Australian actress
- Judy McDonald, American comedian
- Judy Minx (born circa 1989), French pornographic actress
- Judy Moorcroft (1933–1991), costume designer
- Judy Morris (born 1947), Australian actress, director, and screenwriter
- Judy Mowatt (born 1952), Jamaican reggae singer
- Judy Munsen (born 1949), television and video game score composer
- Judy Kay Newton, birth name of Juice Newton (born 1952), American country and pop singer
- Judy Niemack (born 1954), American jazz vocalist
- Judy Nugent (1940–2023), American actress
- Judy Nunn (born 1945), Australian actress, screenwriter, and novelist
- Judy Ongg (born 1950), Taiwanese actress and singer
- Judy Pace (born 1942), American actress
- Judy Pancoast (born 1959), American children's musician
- Judy Parfitt (born 1935), English actress
- Judy Prescott, American actress and poet
- Judy Reyes (born 1967), American actress
- Judy Roderick (1942–1992), American folk and blues singer
- Judy Rodman (born 1951), American country music singer
- Judy Ann Santos (born 1978), Filipino actress and pop singer
- Judy Sheindlin (born 1942), American television personality known as "Judge Judy"
- Judy Shepherd (died 2009) of the Shepherd Sisters, American singing group
- Judy Small, Australian singer–songwriter and judge
- Judy Strangis (born 1949), American actress
- Judy Street (born c. 1949), American soul singer
- Judy Stone (born 1942), Australian pop and country music singer
- Judy Norton Taylor (born 1958), American actress
- Judy Tenuta (1956–2022), American comedian and musician
- Judy Toll (1958–2002), American comedian and screenwriter
- Judy Lee Tomerlin (1939–2008), model
- Judy Torres (born 1968), American electronic musician and singer
- Judy Trammell (born 1958), American cheerleader and cheer choreographer
- Judy Tyler (1932–1957), American actress
- Judy Tyler (model), American (1947–2013)
- Judy Tylor, birth name of Jud Tylor (born 1979), Canadian actress
- Judy Wadsworth, Miss Nevada 1958
- Judy Wilson (actress), English (1938—2006)
- Judy Blye Wilson, American television casting director
- Judy Weinstein, American dance music scene figure
- Judy Weiss (born 1972), German theater and jazz singer
- Judy Winter (born 1944), German actress

=== Athletics ===
- Judy Amoore (born 1940), Australian runner
- Judy Bell (1936–2025), American golfer and golf executive
- Judy Blumberg (born 1957), American ice dancer
- Judy Canty (long jumper), Australian (1931–2016)
- Judy Wills Cline (born 1948), American gymnast and acrobat
- Judy Connor (born 1953), New Zealand tennis player
- Judy Crawford (born 1951), Canadian skier
- Judy-Joy Davies (1928–2016), Australian swimmer
- Judy Devlin (1935–2024), American badminton player
- Judy Dickinson (born 1950), American golfer
- Judy Diduck (born 1966), Canadian ice hockey player
- Judy Dixon (born 1949), American tennis player and coach
- Judy Doyle, Irish camogie player
- Judy Esmond (born 1960), Australian cricket player
- Judy Gans (1886–1949), American Negro leagues baseball player and manager
- Judy Glenney (born 1949), American weightlifter and coach
- Judy Goodrich (fencer) (born 1939), American fencer
- Judy Green (volleyball coach), American
- Judy Grinham (born 1939), British swimmer
- Judy Guinness (1910–1952), British fencer
- Judy Hahn, American volleyball coach
- Judy Harlan (1896–1978), American football (gridiron) player
- Judy Johnson (1899–1989), American Negro leagues baseball player
- Judy Kimball (born 1938), American golfer
- Judy Leden (born 1959), British hang glider and paraglider
- Judy Long (born 1969), Chinese-Canadian table tennis player
- Judy MacMillan (1865–1936), Scottish rugby player
- Judy Martin (wrestler), American (born 1955)
- Judy Melick (born 1954), American swimmer
- Judy Mosley-McAfee (1968–2013), American basketball player
- Judy Nagel (born 1951), American skier
- Judy Masters (1892–1955), Australian football (soccer) player
- Judy Murray (born 1959), Scottish tennis coach
- Judy Oakes (born 1958), British shot putter
- Judy Peckham (born 1950), Australian runner
- Judy Playfair (born 1953), Australian swimmer
- Judy Porter, New Zealand football (soccer) player
- Judy Rabinowitz (born 1958), American skier
- Judy Rankin (born 1945), American golfer
- Judy Reeder (born 1948), American swimmer
- Judy Reynolds (born 1981), Irish dressage rider
- Judy Rose, American basketball coach and athletic director
- Judy Samuel (born 1943), British swimmer
- Judy Schwomeyer (born 1950), American ice dancer
- Judy Shapiro-Ikenberry (born 1942), American long-distance runner
- Judy Simpson (born 1960), British heptathlete
- Judy Sowinski (1940–2011), American roller derby skater and coach
- Judy Strong (born 1960), American field hockey player
- Judy Tegart (born 1937), Australian tennis player
- Judy Vernon (born 1945), British hurdler

=== Academia ===
- Judy Armitage (born 1951), British biochemist
- Judy Baca (born 1946), American social science professor, artist, and activist
- Judy Bonner, American academic executive
- Judy Birmingham, English-Australian archaeologist
- Judy Clapp (born 1930), American computer scientist
- Judy Delin, British linguist
- Judy Dempsey (born 1956), Irish journalist and researcher
- Judy Feder, American political scientist
- Judy Fierstein, American geologist
- Judy Franz (born 1938), American physicist
- Judy Genshaft (born 1948), American academic executive
- Judy Hample (born 1957), American academic executive
- Judy Ho, Taiwanese-American psychologist, professor, and television personality
- Judy Holdener (born 1965), American mathematician
- Judy Illes (born 1960), American neurologist
- Judy Klitsner, religion lecturer and writer
- Judy Mikovits, American researcher
- Judy Jolley Mohraz (born 1943), American women's studies historian and philanthropist
- Judy Olian, American academic executive
- Judy Roitman (born 1945), American mathematician
- Judy Shepard-Kegl, American linguist
- Judy Stamps, American ecologist
- Judy Wajcman (born 1950), sociologist
- Judy L. Walker, American mathematician
- Judy Yung (1946–2020), American historian
- Judy Zeh, American statistician

=== Literature ===
- Judy Balan, Indian satirical writer
- Judy Blume (born 1938), American children's and young adult novelist
- Judy Blundell, American children's and young adult writer (under the name Jude Watson)
- Judy Blunt (born 1954), American essayist
- Judy Budnitz (born 1973), American fiction writer
- Judy Clemens, American mystery writer
- Judy Corbalis, New Zealand fiction writer
- Judy Croome (born 1958), South African fiction writer and poet
- Judy-Lynn del Rey (1943–1986), American science fiction editor
- Judy Doenges (fl. 2019), American short story writer
- Judy Fong Bates (born 1949), Chinese-Canadian writer
- Judy GeBauer, American playwright
- Judy Grahn (born 1940), American poet and writer
- Judy Jordan (born 1961), American poet
- Judy Lucero (deceased), American poet
- Judy Malloy (born 1942), American poet
- Judy Pascoe, Australian novelist and acrobat
- Judy Rothman, American screenwriter
- Judy Troy, American fiction writer and literature professor
- Judy Waite, British picture book writer and young adult novelist
- Judy Upton (born 1967), British playwright

=== Journalism ===
- Judy Bailey (born c. 1952–1953), Australian television news anchor
- Judy Barden (1911-1996), British journalist
- Judy Battista (born 1966), American sports journalist
- Judy Bolch, American journalist
- Judy Crichton (1929–2007), American television news producer
- Judy Fortin, American television reporter and anchor
- Judy Lee Klemesrud (1939–1985), American magazine and newspaper journalist
- Judy Licht, American television reporter and fashion writer
- Judy MacDonald (born 1964), Canadian magazine and television journalist, and writer
- Judy Maddren, Canadian radio announcer
- Judy Mann (1943–2005), American newspaper reporter
- Judy Muller, American television reporter
- Judy Stone (journalist) (1924–2017), American film critic
- Judy Waytiuk, Canadian freelance writer and reporter
- Judy Woodruff (born 1946), American television journalist and anchor

=== Fine arts ===
- Judy Cassab (1920–2015), Australian painter
- Judy Chicago (born 1939), American installation artist
- Judy Clark (artist) (born 1949), British
- Judy Dater (born 1941), American photographer
- Judy Dunaway (born 1964), composer and sonic installation artist
- Judy Fox (born 1957), American sculptor
- Judy Fiskin (born 1945), American photographer and art film maker
- Judy Francesconi (born 1957), American photographer
- Judy Jensen (born 1953), American glass artist
- Judy Millar (born 1957), New Zealand painter
- Judy Watson Napangardi, Australian painter
- Judy Nylon, Anglo-American multidisciplinary artist and punk rocker
- Judy Pfaff (born 1946), American installation artist
- Judy Radul (born 1962), American multimedia, performance, and installation artist
- Judy Rifka (born 1945), American painter and video artist
- Judy McIntosh Wilson (born 1937), New Zealand sculptor and fibre artist

=== Classical music ===
- Judy Kang, Canadian violinist, producer, singer, and composer
- Judy Klein (born 1943), American composer, pianist, and music educator

=== Crime and justice ===
- Judy Amar, American burglar
- Judy Buenoano (1943–1998), American murderer
- Judy Clarke (born 1952), American criminal defense attorney
- Judy Moran (born 1944), Australian gangster and murderer

=== Culinary arts ===
- Judy Joo (born 1974), American restaurateur, chef, and television personality
- Judy Mazel (1943–2007), author of "The Beverly Hills Diet"
- Judy Rodgers (1956–2013), American chef and cookbook writer

=== Other ===
- Judy Bentinck (born 1952), couture milliner
- Judy Blame (1960–2018), English club hipster, stylist, designer, and art director
- Judy Cannato, American retreat facilitator, spiritual director, and writer
- Judy Feld Carr (born 1938), Canadian population rescuer
- Judy Gao (born 1994), New Zealand fashion designer and chess player
- Judy Green (socialite) (1931–2001), American
- Judy Harrow (1945–2014), American counselor, Wiccan priestess, and writer
- Judy Horacek (born 1961), Australian cartoonist, illustrator, and children's writer
- Judy Hornby, British-American fashion designer
- Judy Irving, American documentary filmmaker
- Judy Lewent, American business executive
- Judy McGrath (born 1952), American television executive
- Judy Hoback Miller (born 1937), American Watergate scandal figure
- Judy Nelson, American litigant and memoirist
- Judy Shalom Nir-Mozes (born 1958), Israeli socialite and television host
- Judy Peiser (born 1945), American folk music and folklore expert
- Judy Castle Scott, American bind advocate and activist in the field of vision loss
- Judy Smith, American crisis manager
- Judy Spreckels (1933–2015), American confidante of Elvis Presley

== Fictional characters ==
- Judy Alvarez, techie, braindance editor from Cyberpunk 2077
- Judy, wife of Pulcinella in Punch and Judy shows
- Judy, another alias used by the character Judith Myers from the film Halloween
- title character of the film Judy Berlin
- Judy Bolton, protagonist of the Judy Bolton Series of books
- Judy Brownlee, in the TV soap opera Shortland Street
- Judy Foster, protagonist of the radio show A Date with Judy and film A Date with Judy
- Judy Geller, recurring character in the TV show Friends
- Judy Hensler, in the TV sitcom Leave It to Beaver
- Judy Hopps, rabbit protagonist of the animated film Zootopia
- Judy Jetson, cartoon character in the TV sitcom The Jetsons
- Judy Moody, protagonist of a series of books by Megan McDonald
- Judy of the Jungle, golden-age comic book heroine
- Judy Reeves, Fred Jones' mother in Scooby-Doo! Mystery Incorporated

== See also ==
- Judi
- Judie
- Judy (disambiguation)
- Judith (disambiguation)
