= List of University of Missouri faculty =

This is a list of the notable faculty of the University of Missouri: professors, lecturers and researchers.

== Arts, film, music and literature ==
- Omowale Akintunde, filmmaker
- William Berry, emeritus professor, former chair of art department
- George Caleb Bingham, artist
- Michael J. Budds, musicologist
- Melissa Click, mass communications educator
- Julia Gaines, percussionist
- Albert Lewin, film director and producer
- Lily Mabura, Kenyan writer
- Howard Wight Marshall, fiddler, historian, and folk expert

== Athletics ==
- Chester Brewer, MU football coach

== Education ==
- James Thomas Quarles, organist and educator

== History ==
- Lewis Eldon Atherton, historian, Guggenheim fellow
- Susan Porter Benson (1943–2005), labor historian
- Bessie Leach Priddy (1871–1935), dean of women
- Kerby A. Miller, historian of Ireland and Irish immigration, currently teaching at the University of Missouri.

== Journalism ==
- Judy Bolch, Houston Harte Chair in Journalism
- Roy M. Fisher, dean of School of Journalism (1971–1982)

== Government and law ==
- Duane Benton, federal judge
- Philemon Bliss, Ohio congressman
- Dennis Crouch, author of the "Patently-O" blog on United States patent law
- David Gamage, professor of tax law and health law
- Chuck Gross, former Missouri senator
- Ed Robb, former director of the College of Business and Public Administration Research Center, the Economic Policy and Analysis Research Center, and the State and Fiscal Studies Unit

== Science and technology ==
- James William Abert, explorer
- Edgar Allen, discovered estrogen
- Leonard Blumenthal, mathematician
- Rick Brandenburg, etymologist
- Linda Bullock, nursing
- Max Mapes Ellis, physiologist and explorer
- David C. Geary, developmental psychologist
- Linda M. Godwin, former astronaut, astronomy and physics professor
- Mary Jane Guthrie, zoologist and cancer researcher
- Eliot S. Hearst, psychologist and professional chess player
- Steve Hofmann, mathematician
- Sergei Kopeikin, relativistic astrophysicist and astronomer
- Bahram Mashhoon, general relativity physicist
- Maurice Mehl, paleontologist and geologist
- George Rédei, plant biologist
- George P. Smith, winner of the 2018 Nobel Prize in chemistry
- Zbylut Twardowski, nephrologist

== Social sciences ==
- Robert W. Habenstein, sociologist
- Winifred Smeaton Thomas, anthropologist
- Thorstein Veblen, economist
