= Judee =

Judee is a given name. Notable people with the name include:

- Judee Sill (1944–1979), American singer-songwriter
- Judee K. Burgoon (born 1948), American professor

== See also ==
- Judi
- Judie
- Judy (given name)
- Judith (given name)
