= Bella Terra =

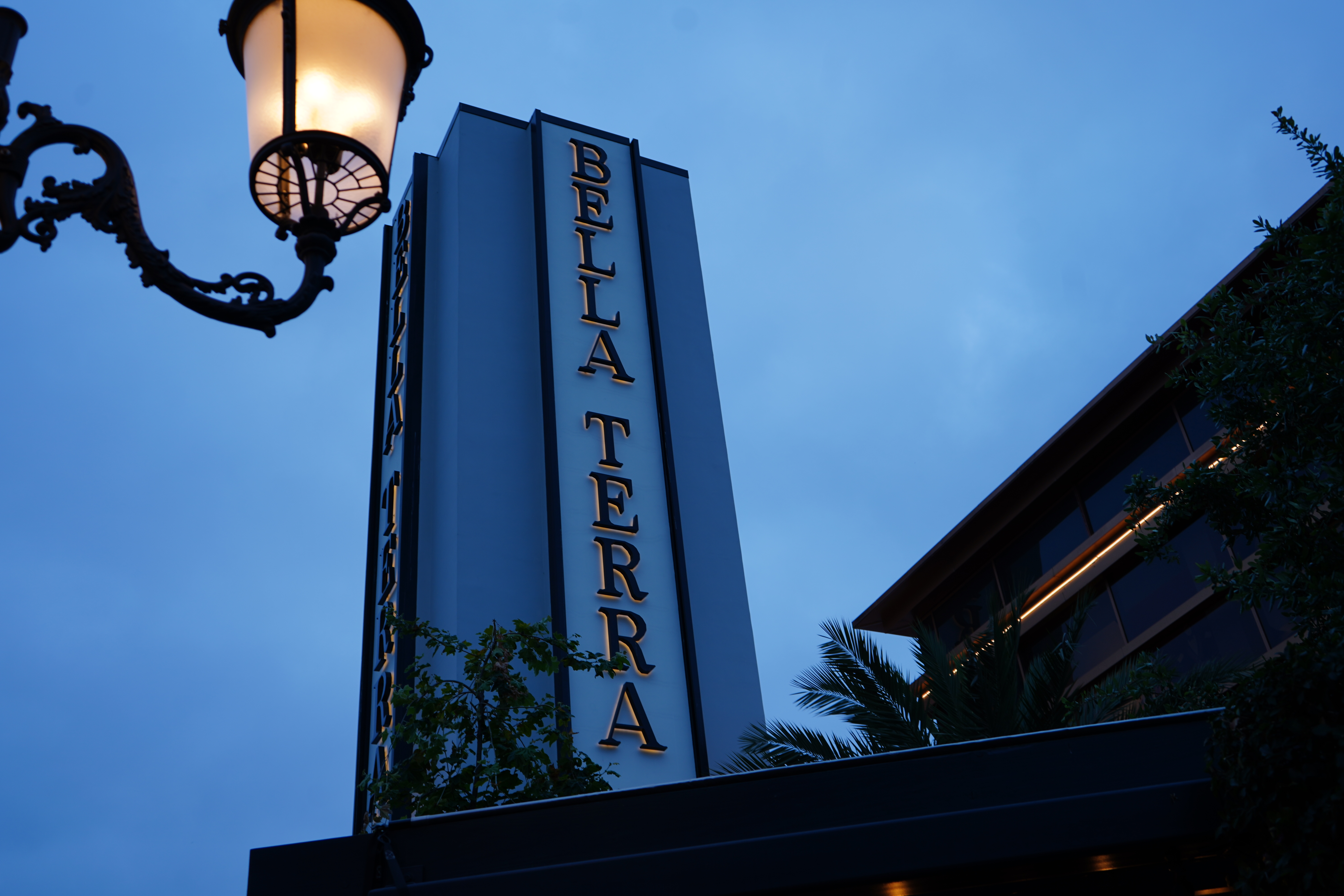
- Bella Terra Tower
- Location: Huntington Beach, California, United States
- Coordinates: 33°43′54.43″N 117°59′37.04″W
- Address: 7777 Edinger Avenue
- Opened: 1966 (original indoor mall)/2006 (current lifestyle center)
- Closed: 2003 (original indoor mall)
- Manager: Centennial Real Estate Management L.L.C.
- Owner: PGIM Real Estate
- Architect: Perkowitz & Ruth
- Num. of stores: 100
- Num. of anchor tenants: 10
- Parking: Parking lot, parking garage
- Website: bellaterra-hb.com

Bella Terra is a lifestyle center in Huntington Beach, California. It was built on the site of the former Huntington Center. The center is currently anchored by Kohl's, Barnes & Noble, Cinemark Theaters, Whole Foods Market, and Costco Wholesale.

== History ==
=== Huntington Center ===
==== Early years ====
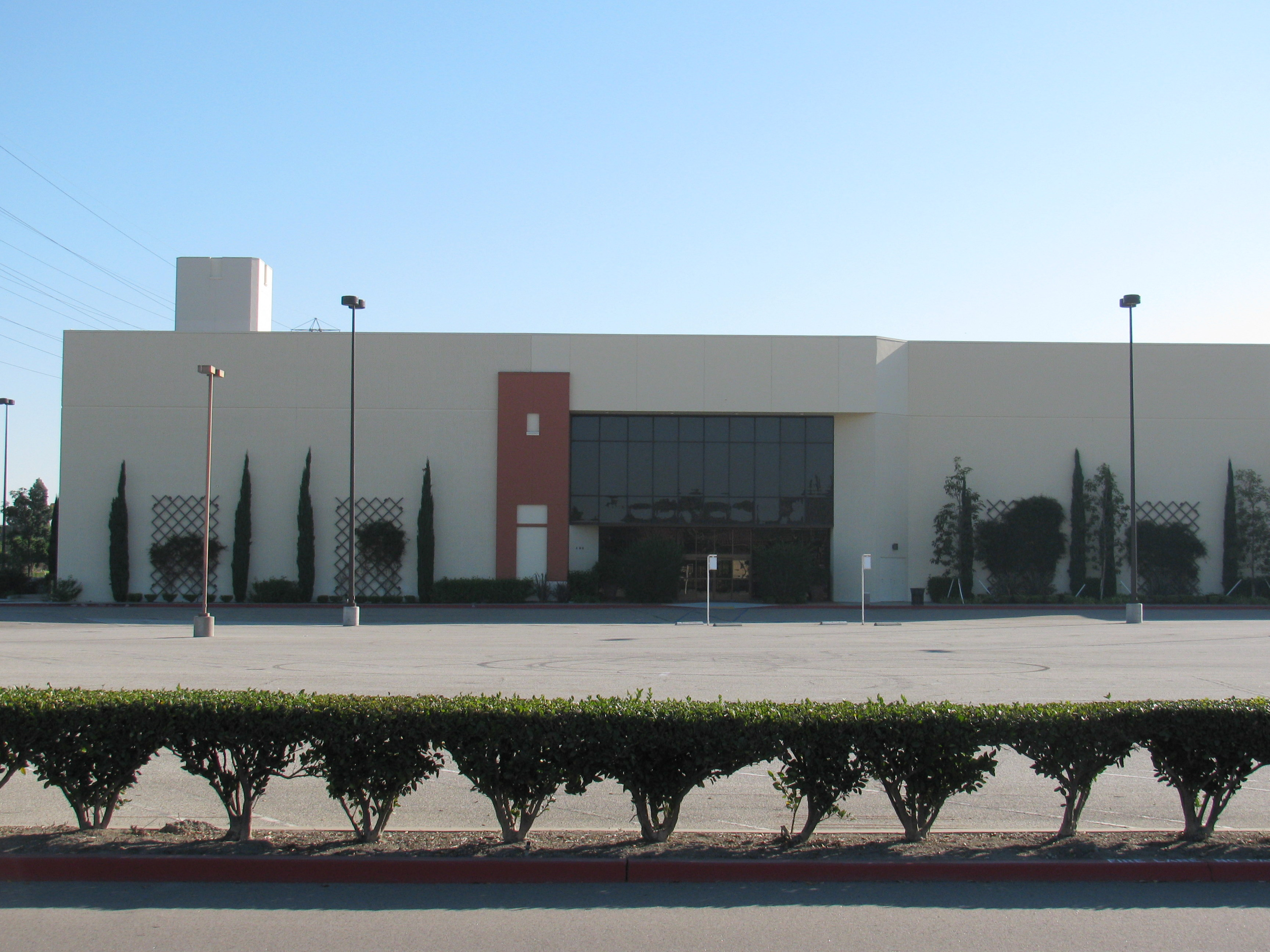
The Mervyn's was closed in late 2008. It sat vacant from 2008 to 2010 before it was demolished.

The Huntington Center was the first enclosed, all-weather mall in Orange County. It was constructed at a cost of $20,000,000 and opened in 1966 with 55 retailers occupying a total of 842,855 square feet (78,303.8 m^{2}) of retail space on a 58-acre (23 ha) lot, and parking for 3,700 cars.

The mall originally had 4 anchor stores:

- The Broadway - 2 stories, 150,000 square feet (14,000 m^{2}) on a 12-acre (4.9 ha) lot, Charles Luckman and Associates, architects
- JCPenney - 2 stories, 206,090 square feet (19,146 m^{2}) plus a 20,000 square feet (1,900 m^{2}) auto service center
- Montgomery Ward - 2 stories, 168,900 square feet (15,690 m^{2}) plus a 29,000 square feet (2,700 m^{2}) auto service center on a 13.6-acre (5.5 ha) lot
- Barker Brothers - 2 stories, furniture store (designed in the same style as The Broadway) across the parking lot and an unenclosed strip of several shops adjacent.

Additional tenants at opening included Lerner's, Judy's, Harris & Frank, Leed's, Kinney Shoes, Thom McAn, Security First National Bank, Crocker-Citizens National Bank Food Fair supermarket and Thrifty Drug Stores. An eight-ton statue from Budapest, Hungary was installed in the center of the mall.

==== Later years ====
In November 1986, a new wing opened, with Mervyn's added as its fourth anchor store and a new food court. In November 1993, JCPenney closed and relocated to the nearby Westminster Mall. In 1995, Burlington Coat Factory replaced JCPenney. Barnes & Noble opened that October, moving into the long-vacant former Barker Bros. building. In August 1996, The Broadway closed, after the company was purchased by Macy's and liquidated. The wing between the shuttered The Broadway building and Burlington Coat Factory was closed and sealed off shortly thereafter, as the mall's business begins to decline rapidly.

==== Closure ====
In 2000, Burlington Coat Factory sued the mall's owners, claiming they were being "forced out" during the mall's redevelopment. In March 2001, Montgomery Ward became the last original anchor store to close, when the parent chain was liquidated. The mall itself closed in 2003, except for Mervyn's and Burlington Coat Factory. The mall was demolished soon afterward, except for the four anchor structures - Burlington Coat Factory, Mervyn's, and the empty Montgomery Ward and The Broadway buildings.

=== Bella Terra ===
Bella Terra opened in 2006, with Kohl's in the old The Broadway building. In 2008, Mervyn's closed due to liquidation and Circuit City closed due to bankruptcy. In 2010, the vacant Montgomery Ward and Mervyn's buildings were demolished. That same year, Whole Foods Market opened in the former Circuit City location. Costco opened in May 2012. In 2013, The Residences at Bella Terra, a 467-unit apartment complex with retail space on the ground level, opened on the site of the former Montgomery Ward anchor building. In early 2023, Staples, another long term tenant, closed and was redeveloped into Ulta Beauty. In early 2025, Burlington Coat Factory closed permanently to make way for new apartments.
