= Donaghy =

Donaghy is an Irish surname. Notable people and characters with the name include:

- Kieran Donaghy, Gaelic footballer for Austin Stacks and Kerry, and basketball player
- Bernard Donaghy (died 1953), Northern Irish footballer
- Don Donaghy (1936–2008), American photographer
- Eileen Donaghy (1930–2008), Irish traditional singer
- Frederick Anthony Donaghy (1903–1988), American-born Catholic bishop in China
- Gerard Donaghy (1954–1972), Northern Irish youth killed by British security forces
- Jack Donaghy, a fictional character in 30 Rock
- Judi Donaghy (born 1960), American vocalist, producer and songwriter
- Mal Donaghy (born 1957), Northern Irish footballer
- Mary Donaghy (born 1939), New Zealand Olympic athlete
- Michael Donaghy (1954–2004), American poet and musician
- Plunkett Donaghy, Tyrone Gaelic footballer
- Siobhán Donaghy (born 1984), English singer-songwriter
- Tim Donaghy (born 1967), American basketball referee
- Tom Donaghy, American playwright

== Sarah Donaghy ==
- Donachie (surname)
- Donaghey
