= Judy =

Judy is a short form of the name Judith.

Judy may also refer to:

== Places ==
- Judy, Kentucky, village in Montgomery County, United States
- Judy Woods, woodlands in Bradford, West Yorkshire, England, United Kingdom

== Animals ==
- Judy (dog) (1936–1950), Royal Navy Second World War ship's dog awarded the Dickin Medal
- Judy of Punch and Judy (dogs) (fl. 1946), British dog awarded the Dickin Medal
- Judy the Beauty (foaled 2009), Canadian-American racehorse

== People and fictional characters ==
- Judy (given name), a list of people and fictional characters
- Judy (surname)

== Music ==
- Judy (Judy Garland album) (1956)
- Judy (Judy Rodman album) (1986)
- "Judy" (Elvis Presley song) (1961)
- "Judy" (The Pipettes song) (2005)
- "Judy" (Thomas Anders song) (1980)
- "Judy", a song from the album Lost & Found (1961–62) by The Beach Boys
- "Judy", a song from the album On the Double by Golden Earring
- "Judy", a song from Tony Bennett's album When Lights Are Low by Hoagy Carmichael and Sammy Lerner

== Magazines ==
- Judy (satirical magazine), extant 1867–1907
- Judy (girls' magazine), extant 1960–1991

== Other uses ==
- Judy (2019 film), a biopic about the life of Judy Garland
- Judy, Allied codename for the Japanese Yokosuka D4Y dive bomber aircraft during World War II
- Judy, a colloquial name for a dress form
- Judy's, a defunct chain of clothing stores based in Los Angeles
- Judy, British slang for a girl or woman
- Typhoon Judy, tropical cyclones with the name
- Judy, Canadian name for the Jucika comic series

== See also ==
- Abisara, Archigenes (butterfly), Afriodinia, Sibosia - genera of metalmark butterflies commonly known as the Judies
- Judy array, a complex data structure in computer science
- Judy Trust, a Sierra Leonean charity
- Judi
- Judie
- Judith
