= Jeudy =

Jeudy is a surname. Notable people with the surname include:

- Charlot Jeudy (1984–2019), Haitian LGBT rights activist
- Gabe Jeudy-Lally (born 2001), American football player
- Jean Jeudy (born 1958), American politician
- Jerry Jeudy (born 1999), American football wide receiver
- Sherly Jeudy (born 1998), Haitian footballer
- Vicky Jeudy, Haitian-American actress
- Yves Jeudy (born 1958), Haitian boxer

== See also ==
- Judy (disambiguation)
