= Judi =

Judi is a name with multiple origins. It is a short form of the Hebrew name Judith. It is also an Arabic name referring to a mountain mentioned in the Quran. It may refer to:

- Judi Andersen (born 1958), beauty pageant titleholder from Hawaii who won Miss USA 1978
- Judi Ann Mason (1955–2009), American television writer, producer and playwright
- Judi Bari (1949–1997), American environmentalist and labor leader, feminist, principal organizer of Earth First
- Judi Barrett (born in United Kingdom) is an author of several picture books
- Judi Bowker (born 1954), English television and cinema actress
- Judi Brown (born 1961), American athlete who competed mainly in the 400 metre hurdles
- Judi Chamberlin (1944–2010), American activist, leader, organizer, public speaker and educator in the psychiatric survivors movement
- Judi Connelli (born 1947), award-winning singer and actress
- Judi Dench, CH, DBE, FRSA (born 1934), English film, stage and television actress
- Judi Donaghy (born 1960), American vocalist, producer and songwriter from the Twin Cities
- Judi Doull (born 1938), former New Zealand cricketer
- Judi Dutcher, attorney and former politician who served as the Minnesota State Auditor from 1995 to 2003
- Judi Evans (born 1964), American Emmy Award-winning actress
- Judi Farr, Australian theatre, film and television actor
- Judi Fotheringill or Judianne Fotheringill (born 1944), American pair skater
- Judi M. gaiashkibos (born 1953), Ponca Santee administrator
- Judi Garman (born 1944), former college softball coach
- Judi Genovesi (born 1957), American ice dancer
- Judi Giuliani or Judith Giuliani (born 1954), nurse, fundraiser, former managing director of Changing Our World, wife of Rudy Giuliani
- Judi Lines, former British television and radio broadcaster
- Judi Longfield, PC (born 1947), Canadian politician
- Judi McLeod (born 1944), Canadian journalist who operates the conservative Canadian website, Canada Free Press
- Judi Meredith (1936–2014), former American actress
- Judi Moen (born 1954), former talk show host and news reporter for WBBM-TV in Chicago
- Judi Monterey (born 1944), American model and actress
- Judi Moriarty or Judith Moriarty (born 1942), American politician from Missouri
- Judi Moylan (born 1944), Australian politician, Liberal member of the Australian House of Representatives
- Judi Patton (born 1940), Former First Lady of Kentucky
- Judi Radin (born 1950), American bridge player
- Judi Richards (born 1949), Canadian pop singer and songwriter
- Judi Scott or Judith Scott (1957–2018), British theatrical, film and television actress
- Judi Shekoni, British actress, model and television presenter who is based in Hollywood
- Judi Silvano (born 1951), is a jazz singer and composer
- Judi Spiers (born 1953), presenter on British radio and television
- Judi Trott (born 1962), English actress
- Judi Tyabji (born 1965), former British Columbia politician, wife of Gordon Wilson
- Judi Warren, American basketball player

== See also ==
- Judi Mosque in Hyderabad, Andhra Pradesh, India
- Judi-Dart, United States sounding rocket
- Mount Judi, Şırnak Province, Southeastern Anatolia Region, Turkey
- Judy (personal name)
- Judy (disambiguation)
- Judie
