= Donachie =

Donachie or Donnachie is a surname derived from Scottish Gaelic Donnachaidh. Notable people with the surname include:

- David Donachie (born 1944), Scottish novelist
- James Donachie (born 1993), Australian football (soccer) player
- Kaye Donachie (born 1970), British painter
- Patrick Donachie (born 1983), Australian Paralympic swimmer
- Ron Donachie (born 1956), Scottish actor
- Willie Donachie (born 1951), Scottish international football player

== Donnachie ==
- Charles Donnachie (born 1869), Scottish football player
- Joe Donnachie (born 1885), Scottish international football player

== See also ==
- Clan Robertson–Donnachaidh–Duncan
- Donnachie Cliff
- Donaghy (surname)
