= Westminster Mall (California) =

Defunct mall in Orange County, California, U.S.

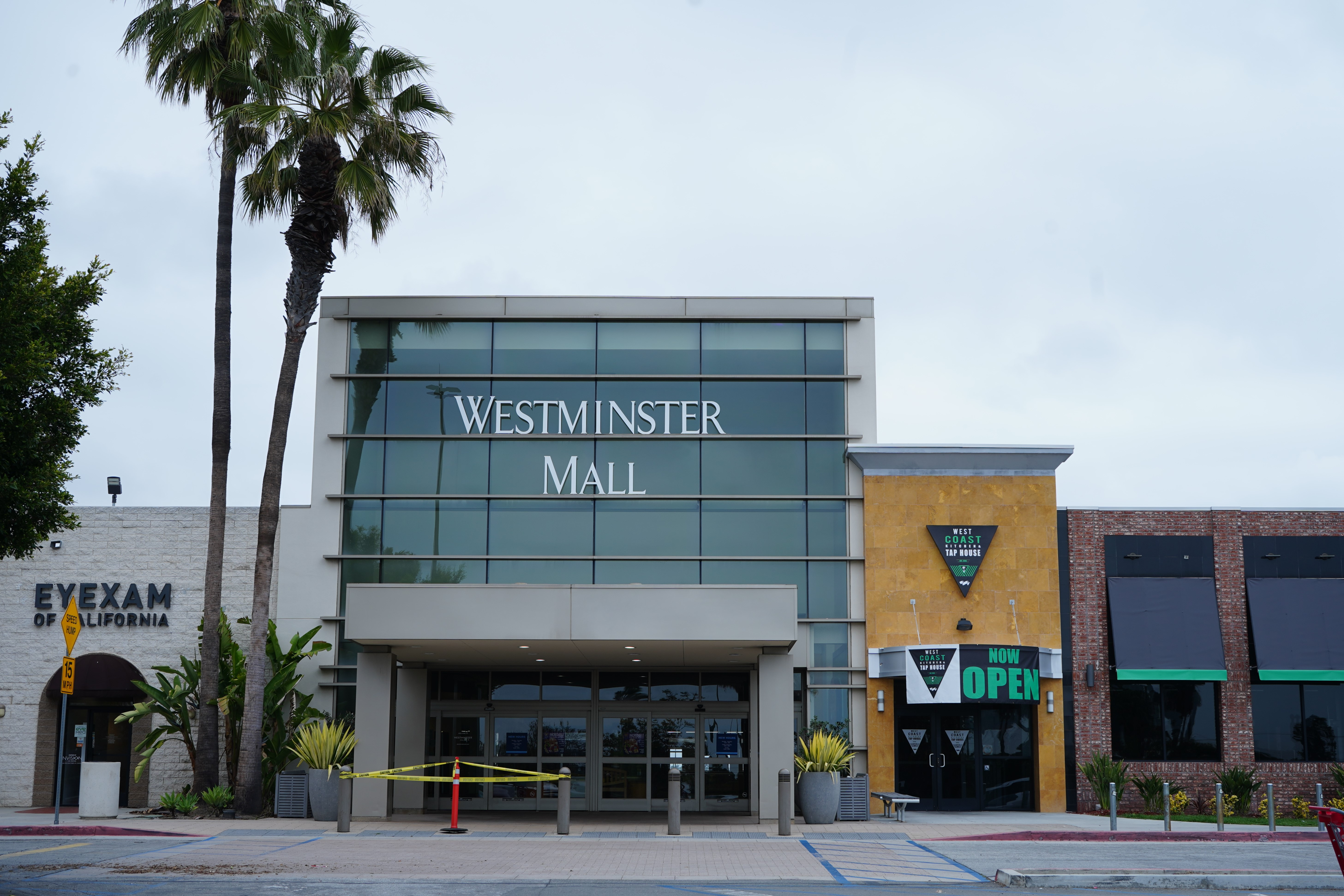
- Main entrance (April 2022)
- Location: Westminster, California, U.S.
- Coordinates: 33.74727°N 118.01232°W
- Address: 1025 Westminster Mall
- Opened: August 7, 1974; 52 years ago
- Renovated: 1987–1989; April–November 2008
- Closed: October 29, 2025; 12 months ago
- Demolished: April 15, 2026 (ongoing)
- Developer: Homart Development Company
- Owner: Shopoff Realty Investments
- Architect: Architectonics, Inc. and C.H. Leavell Company
- Num. of stores: 168 (at peak)
- Num. of anchor tenants: 4 (1 open, 3 vacant)
- Floor area: 1,195,000 square feet (111,000 m^{2})
- Floors: 2
- Website: westminstermall.com at the Wayback Machine (archived October 29, 2025)
- Building details
- Boarded rear entrance (December 2025)

General information
- Status: Undergoing redevelopment
- Construction started: 1972
- Completed: 1974

Design and construction
- Main contractor: C.H. Leavell & Co.

Renovating team
- Renovating firm: Corporate Property Investors (1987–1989); Simon Property Group (April–November 2008)

Westminster Mall was a super-regional shopping mall in Westminster, California, United States, part of Orange County. Opened in August 1974, the mall's only anchor store as of November 2025 is Target, while three vacant spaces were previously occupied Macy's, Sears, and JCPenney. The mall itself closed permanently in October 2025, and its remaining 168 inline stores were evicted.

Westminster Mall was situated on the corner of Goldenwest Street and Bolsa Avenue in Westminster, California. The property is owned by Shopoff Realty Investments with plans to redevelop the site, and the mall was formerly managed by Washington Prime Group. After the mall's closure, it immediately suffered vandalism, making it popular for dead mall urbex before it was ultimately boarded up with plywood in January 2026. As of April 2026, the mall had begun demolition to allow for construction on the mixed-use complex that will replace the shopping center.

== History ==
=== Background ===
In the 1920s, the Akiyama family established a major 40-acre (16 ha) goldfish farm north of Bolsa Avenue and west of Golden West Street in Westminster, California, famously loading up old pickup trucks with barrels of goldfish and koi to sell them throughout Los Angeles. The farm held the title of being the largest in the world locally.

After the booming success of the farm inspired other Nisei families to set up ponds in the area, Westminster earned the official postmark slogan "Goldfish Capital of the World" throughout the 1950s and 1960s. However, by the late 1960s, the completion of the San Diego Freeway (I-405) dramatically increased land value and property taxes in the area. Rising economic pressures and real estate speculation caused local goldfish farming operations to phase out.

=== 1972–1989: Development, opening, and renovation ===
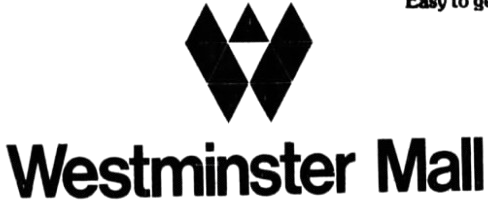
Original logo from 1974

The City of Westminster acquired the property for commercial redevelopment in the early 1970s. In 1972, the Homart Development Company—the real estate development arm of Sears, Roebuck and Co.—announced that a super-regional shopping mall would be built on the former site of the goldfish farm. News outlets at the time marketed the project as a "Sears-built shopping center", and the mall was planned to span nearly 100 acres (40 ha) with 1.2 to 1.3 million square feet (110,000 to 120,000 m^{2}) of retail space, instantly making it the largest enclosed shopping destination in Orange County. The structure was designed by Architectonics, Inc. of Dallas and Chicago, with each department store hiring its own architect. C.H. Leavell & Co. of El Paso was the general contractor, with construction of the mall beginning that year.

Westminster Mall opened to the public at 9:30 a.m. PDT on August 7, 1974, with May Company, Sears itself, and Buffum's. Sears had 200,000 sq ft (19,000 m^{2}) with two floors, and was designed by Skidmore, Owings & Merrill (SOM). Ladd & Kelsey were the architects for the 150,000 sq ft (14,000 m^{2}), two-story May Company store, which boasted a restaurant and cocktail lounge, while the 90,000 sq ft (8,400 m^{2}), two-story Buffum's was designed by Killingsworth, Bradley & Associates. The mall itself featured a pyramid-style court with three floors that had carpeting, sunken lounge conservation pits, and plants throughout. The parking lot had space for 6,600 cars, which was packed during the opening day. J. W. Robinson's was added in April 1975 as the mall's fourth anchor store. In 1982, Homart sold Westminster Mall to Corporate Property Investors (CPI).

After the acquisition, CPI wanted to take Westminster Mall "into the '80s". In late 1987, the 20,000-square-foot (1,900 m^{2}) "Yuppie" food court opened on the upper level near Sears, replacing an original downstairs fast-food area, which was converted into new retail space. By March 1989, it was announced that the mall's original center court would be gutted and replaced with a modern design featuring a glass, two-story triangular structure, a glass-enclosed elevator accented with neon tubes, a fountain pool, and new tiled floors.

=== 1991–2007: Anchor changes ===
Buffum's closed in May 1991 due to the chain being liquidated. By January 1993, Robinson's and May Department Stores merged to form Robinsons-May, with each store carrying the name by February. As a result, the May Company store was rebranded Robinsons-May, and the J. W. Robinson's closed as one of the 12 Robinson's and May Company stores closing as part of the merger to avoid cannibalization. The former Buffum's was converted into a Robinson's-May Home Store in March 1993, but it closed in November of that year. The former Robinson's was replaced by JCPenney, which had relocated from Huntington Center that month. On February 19, 1998, Simon DeBartolo Group Inc. of Indianapolis, Indiana, which later reverted its name to Simon Property Group, acquired CPI for approximately $5.8 billion after outbidding the Rouse Company, thus assuming ownership and management of Westminster Mall.

In 2002, the former Robinsons-May Home Store building was torn down to build a new Macy's. When Federated Department Stores purchased Robinsons-May and other May Co. brands in September 2006, Macy's moved into the former Robinsons-May building, while the original Macy's location within the mall would be taken over by Target on July 29, 2007.

=== 2008–2025: Decline and closure ===
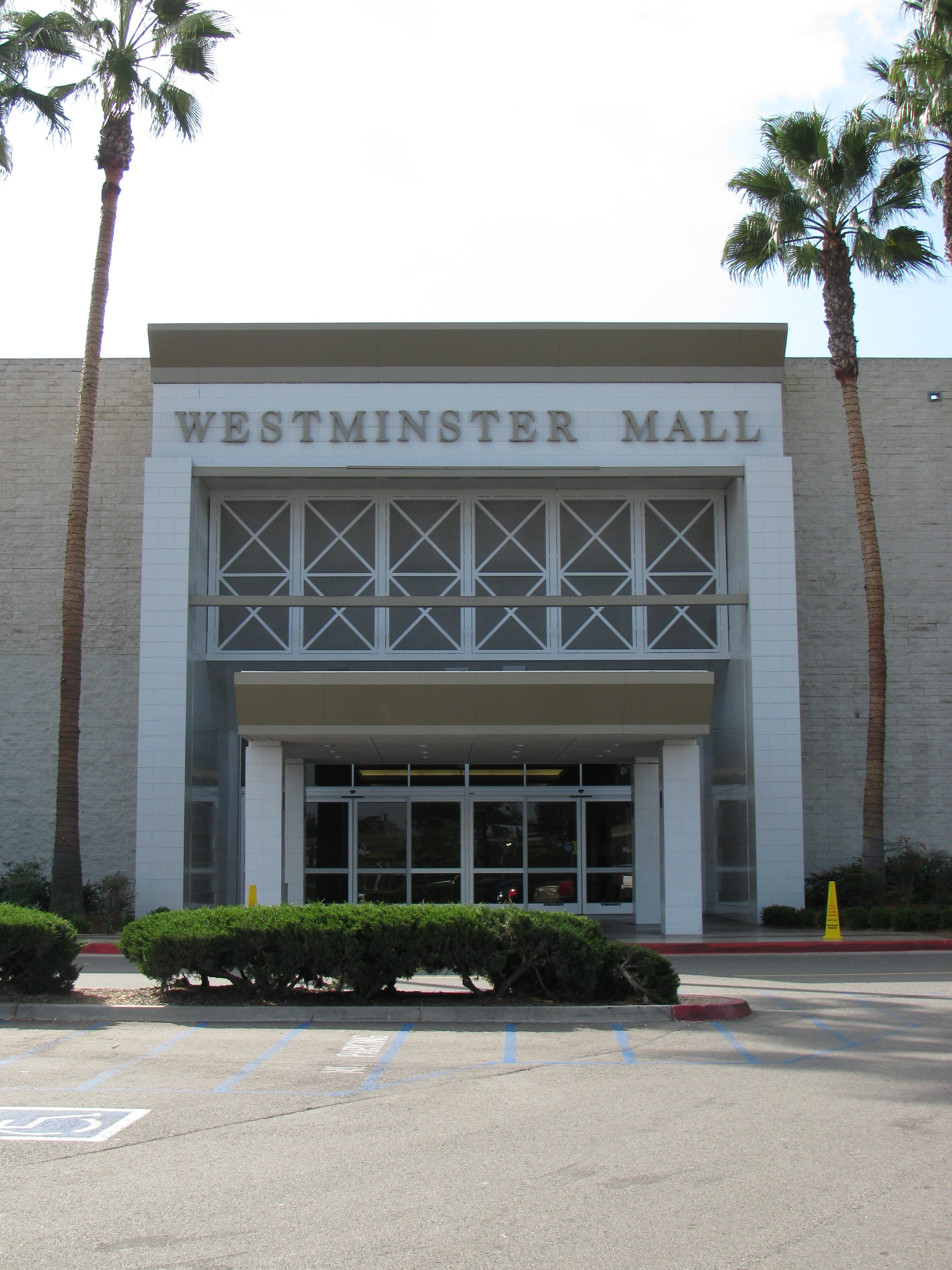
Renovated entrance (November 2009)

On March 12, 2008, Simon announced that the mall would undergo a $10 million renovation to modernize the property to attract upscale tenants. This included carpeting most of the first floor to reduce noise, replacing older animal-statue children's seating areas with standard leather chairs, wood coffee tables, area rugs, and live plants near department store entrances, constructing a new family restroom and lounge area, building a new kids' play zone and relocating the carousel closer to Sears while the play area was moved near JCPenney, remodeling the mall's entrances and re-landscaping the parking lot. The mall closed temporarily to allow for construction and would reopen on November 15 of that year, with the debut of Old Navy.

However, the renovation failed to revitalize Westminster Mall, as it coincided with the Great Recession, and the Orange County Register noted that while the mall was in second place in taxable sales behind South Coast Plaza in 1986, it violently dropped to eighth place in 2011, when they declined by 2.4% in 2010, followed by 1.6% the following year. Its competitors increased by 5.4% in 2010 and 6.5% in 2011 in comparison, as explained by the International Council of Shopping Centers. As of late December 2011, Westminster Mall became Simon's most underperforming property out of five other Orange County malls also owned by them, with occupancy sliding from 92.3% at the end of 2002 to 85.3% in late 2011. The decline was also because the mall failed to adapt while its competitors did; in 1986, South Coast Plaza added the Crystal Court, Santa Ana Fashion Square undergone a $160 million renovation the following year, and Simon has largely been focused and invested on The Outlets at Orange, Laguna Hills Mall, Brea Mall, and The Shops at Mission Viejo. By August 30, 2012, the mall added Pink, The Limited, CUPS Frozen Yogurt, Cotton On, and TGI Fridays.

On May 28, 2014, Simon Property Group spun-off 98 strip malls and underperforming properties to a newly-formed, Columbus, Ohio-based REIT called Washington Prime Group Inc. (WPG), which included Westminster Mall. WPG secured its loan from JPMorgan Chase that year, when the property's value was at $171 million. By November 3, 2015, the Todai Seafood and Sushi Buffet closed, being replaced by Luxe Buffet. That year, Sears Holdings spun off 235 of its properties, including the Sears at Westminster Mall, into Seritage Growth Properties. On May 12, 2016, a 31,682 sq ft (2,943.4 m^{2}) Sky Zone trampoline park opened in the mall's former Old Navy.

Gymboree and Crazy 8 would both close on August 12, 2017, as part of a plan by the Gymboree Group to close 300 underperforming stores (including 24 in California) nationwide after filing for Chapter 11 bankruptcy in June of that year. On January 4, 2018, it was announced that Sears would be closing as part of a plan to close 103 stores nationwide after Sears also filed for Chapter 11. The Westminster Mall location would close in April 2018, making it the last original anchor to vacate. That year, John's Incredible Pizza Company announced that they would open a 41,000 sq ft (3,800 m^{2}) family entertainment center at the mall, creating 150 local jobs and space to support 1,000 people.

==== Final years ====
Empty corridor (September 2025)

During the COVID-19 pandemic, Westminster Mall saw a dramatic decline in sales, due to many of its businesses laying off employees, and their closures. In addition to the financial struggles at the mall, the rise in online shopping also took a toll on the mall's revenue. In April 2020, the empty parking lots were repurposed for COVID-19 and antibody testing clinics operated by Elevated Health, drawing hundreds of vehicles daily with wait times stretching up to six hours. In late September 2020, the mall partnered with the City of Westminster, the police department, and Saddleback Church to act as an emergency food depot. Volunteers transformed the parking lot into a drive-thru assembly line, supplying a week's worth of groceries to nearly 600 local families affected by pandemic unemployment. In November 2020, WPG reached an initial agreement to sell about 43 acres (17 ha) of the property to homebuilder Taylor Morrison for $160 million. WPG originally intended to hold onto 11 acres (4.5 ha) of the retail space.

The pandemic caused Washington Prime's nationwide corporate retail income plummet by roughly $127 million compared to 2019 levels, causing them to file for Chapter 11 bankruptcy in June 2021. In December 2022, the City of Westminster approved a redevelopment plan by adopting the Westminster Mall Specific Plan under Ordinance No. 2592, which called for 3,000 residential units, at least 600,000 square feet (56,000 m^{2}) of commercial, retail, and medical space, and 9.5 acres (3.8 ha) designated for parks and open public spaces. As of April 2023, Spencer Gifts was the last long-term tenant remaining from the opening era of the mall in their original location on the upper level. They temporarily moved downstairs during the pandemic.

In September 2024, after an $85 million loan on the property fell into special servicing earlier that year, financial analytics reports revealed that WPG had quietly entered a 45-to-60 day window to finalize a transaction with a "mystery buyer". However, that specific deal ultimately failed to close.

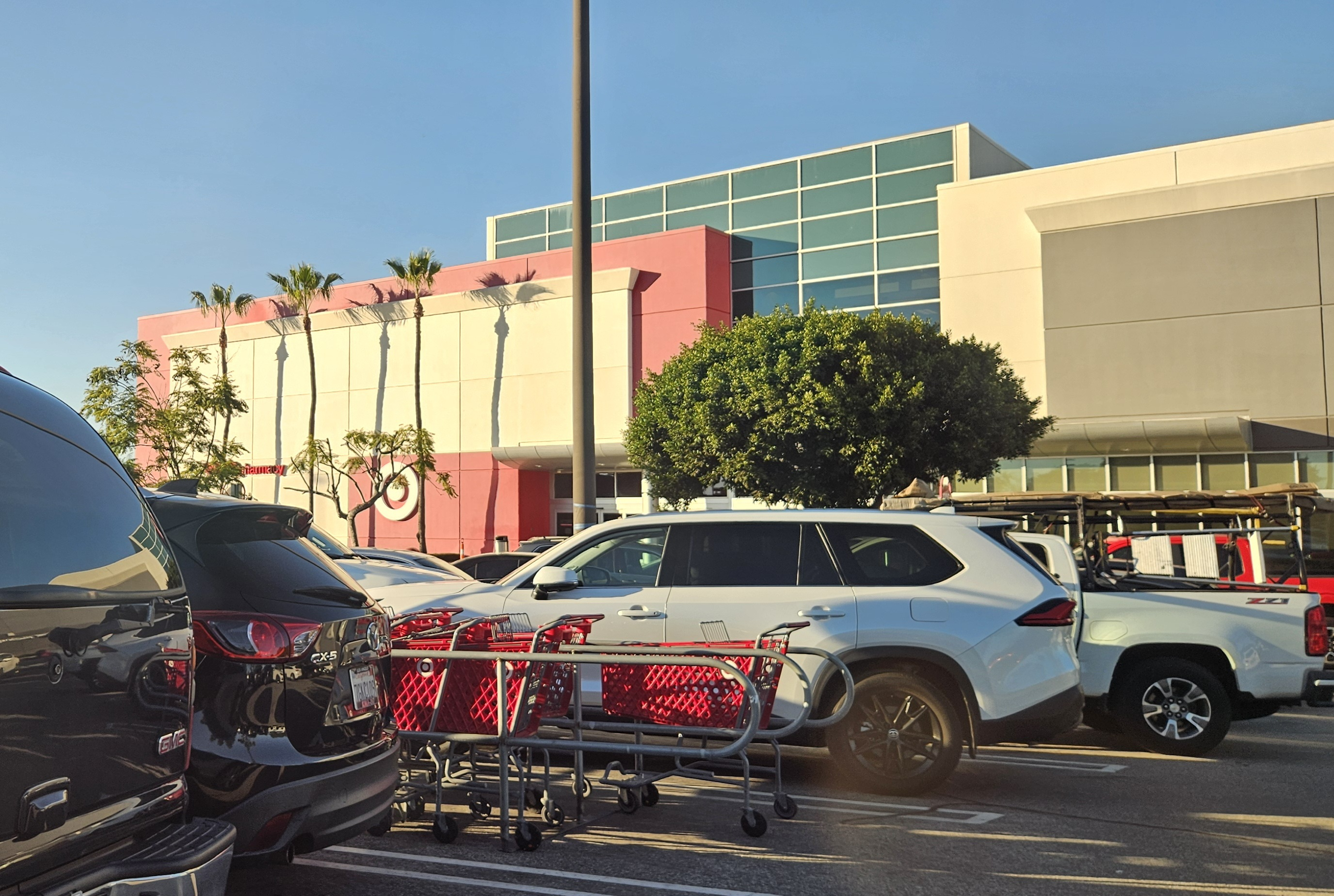
Target, pictured in November 2025, is the last remaining store at the now-demolished mall. Since then, it has operated as a standalone business.

On January 9, 2025, it was announced that Macy's would be closing as part of a plan to close 66 stores nationwide. In April 2025, WPG put its remaining 57.5-acre (23.3 ha) stake in Westminster Mall on sale as part of the company's liquidation efforts after its bankruptcy. On August 20 of that year, it was announced that JCPenney would be closing in November, leaving Target as the mall's last remaining anchor.

On October 21, 2025, Westminster City Manager Christine Cordon confirmed to local news outlets that the remaining 168 inline tenants had to vacate by October 29 due to expiring leases. The community responded by performing a Goodbye to Westminster Mall karaoke party by that day, one of which performing Part of Your World from Disney's 1989 film The Little Mermaid. On October 29, 2025, the mall itself officially closed its doors permanently after the leases of its remaining 168 tenants expired. JCPenney's final day of operation was initially slated to be November 21, 2025, though it closed to the public on November 16.

=== 2026: Vandalism ===
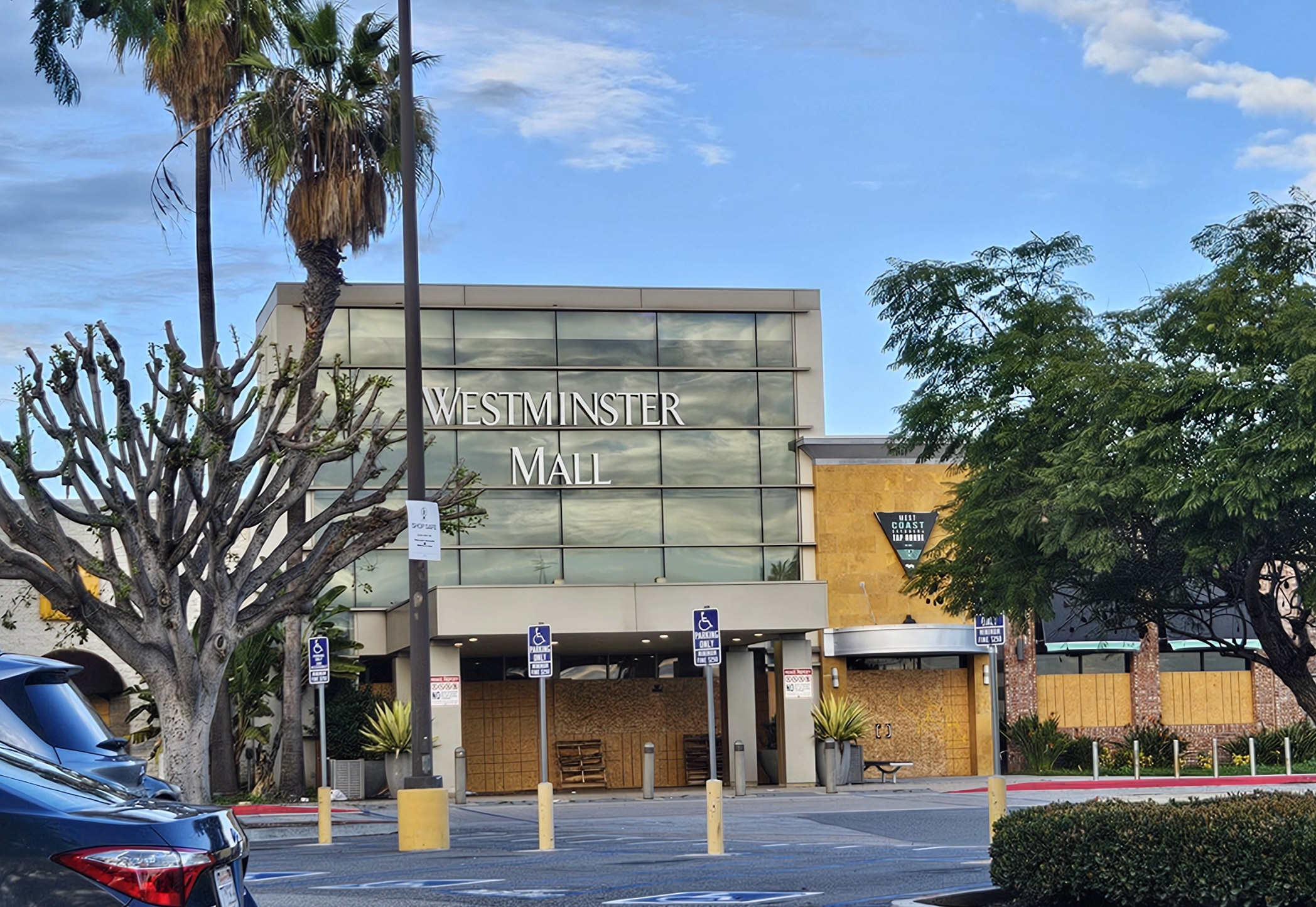
The abandoned mall entrance in January 2026

As of January 2026, news outlets have reported the abandoned mall to be totally trashed, with piles of furniture, graffiti and glass everywhere. One former employee expressed shock at the lack of police and authority present. Westminster police commander Andy Stowers reports that the mall has become a major issue since its closure in October, and that the Westminster police has received over 400 calls for service to the mall, 57 in one week, and that over 30 arrests have been made in relation to trespassing and vandalism. Reportedly, authorities have been patrolling the area more heavily and have been working with the owners of the building to prevent further entry. Despite this, the abandoned mall has been attracting attention from all over southern California. On January 12, the former mall was boarded up with lumber, and fencing was constructed around the property, and an officer patrolling the area.

=== Redevelopment ===
On February 2, 2026, Shopoff Realty Investments announced their acquisition on the remaining piece of the mall from Washington Prime Group was completed. Shopoff Realty plans to redevelop the area with mixed-use housing, townhomes, retail, and a new, relocated Target. The project is known as Bolsa Pacific. Demolition on Westminster Mall started on April 15, 2026. Shopoff Realty announced the following day that besides just the mixed-use development plans, urban green space, a hotel, and walking trails would also be included.

== Transit access ==
OCTA Routes 25 & 64 served Westminster Mall. Route 25, which runs along Goldenwest Street on the eastern side of the mall, provided access from Huntington Beach and northern Orange County. Route 64, which runs along Bolsa Avenue on the southern side of the mall, provided access from cities to the east such as Garden Grove and Santa Ana. The mall was at the western terminus of Route 64. As of April 6, 2026, route 64 no longer services the mall and now serves the Golden West College campus and Bella Terra in Huntington Beach, California.

== See also ==
- Boynton Beach Mall
- Burlington Center
- Century III Mall
- Chapel Hill Mall
- Collin Creek Mall
- Randall Park Mall
- Rolling Acres Mall
