= Critical anthropomorphism =

Perspective in the study of animal behavior

Critical anthropomorphism (from ethology and comparative psychology) refers to a perspective in the study of animal behavior. It uses scientific knowledge of the species, its perceptual world, and ecological and evolutionary history to generate hypotheses through the lens of the sentience of the observer. The term is of particular relevance to mentalistic behavioral mechanisms, and its application involves using "natural history, our perceptions, intuitions, feelings, careful behavioral descriptions, identifying with the animal, optimization models, previous studies, and so forth in order to generate ideas that may prove useful in gaining understanding and the ability to predict outcomes of planned (experimental) and unplanned interventions".

== Background ==
Gordon Burghardt introduced the term critical anthropomorphism in the mid-1980s in an essay tracing historical views on animal awareness and cognition. Though not by name, the concept of critical anthropomorphism has historical roots dating to Jakob von Uexküll's umwelt and innenwelt (German for "environment/surroundings" and "inner world", respectively). Jakob von Uexküll studied numerous organisms with diverse sensory processes, concluding that the human understanding of these processes and the resulting perceptions (the innenwelt), shape human insight regarding the behavior and experiences of nonhuman species. von Uexküll pointed out that although different species share the same physical environment, the relationship between the innenwelt and umwelt of each species is unique due to their adaptively specialized capacities. The concepts of the umwelt and innenwelt originated from classical ethology, prompting scientists including Nikolaas Tinbergen, Konrad Lorenz, Karl von Frisch to consider the role of subjectivity in the design, observation, and interpretation of research studies involving nonhuman species. As noted by Burghardt, critically anthropomorphic approaches are evident in early animal work that recognized the possibility of cognitive processes in animals. Edward Chace Tolman's work on cognitive maps, for example, stands as an early example of critical anthropomorphism.

== Implementation ==
The critically anthropomorphic approach has been applied to a range of species and behavioral and cognitive capacities. Burghardt and Rivas describe case histories of how critical anthropomorphism informed the design and interpretation of animal behavior research. The examples include foraging tactics in snakes, aposematic (warning) coloration, courtship behavior in the Drosophila fruit fly, language and communication, zoo exhibit design, and conservation planning for wildlife management. Rivas and Burghardt also used critical anthropomorphism to explain female biased sexual dimorphism in anacondas and other snakes.

Historically, an idea like critical anthropomorphism would be at odds with behaviorism, but some contemporary investigators of animal conditioning and learning take exception. For example, Timberlake and Delmater (1991) argued that behaviorists should relax their mechanistic constraints and consider the sensory and perceptual worlds of nonhuman species:

Instead of projecting oneself as a particular type of human into the circumstances of the organism, one attempts to assume both the circumstances and the characteristics of the organism...Experimenters not only need to put themselves in the subject's shoes, they need to wear them – walk, watch, hear, touch, and act like the subject. The humility required to assume this role coupled with the power of the experimental approach should increase the efficiency with which the understanding, prediction, and control of behavior can advance.

== Caveats ==
The idea of an inner world resembles subjective states, contrasting it with behaviorism, particularly radical behaviorism. However, even ardent critics of using anecdotes and rich interpretation of animal behavior, such as Conwy Lloyd Morgan, acknowledge that studying the behavior of other organisms requires a degree of introspection on the part of the observer. Morgan argued that studying the behavior of other organisms was a doubly inductive process; this process begins with observation and description of the animal, which is followed by the subjective induction of that behavior based on the observer's own understanding of his or her own conscious experience. Morgan argued that the observer's introspectionis essential to understanding the behavior of others, and he held firm on the importance of remaining critical and objective when doing so. Clive Wynne, a vocal critic of anthropomorphism, considers the alternatives espoused by scientists, such as critical anthropomorphism or biocentric anthropomorphism, to be nonscientific. Wynne discusses the history of anthropomorphism through George Henry Lewes, George Romanes, and Charles Darwin to elaborate on pitfalls, limitations, and the arguably nonscientific status of anthropomorphism. Wynne argues that modern versions of behaviorism are no more accurate than their historical predecessors.

Burghardt counters Wynne's arguments by pointing out that: 1) critical anthropomorphism is not by itself intended to be a description and explanation of behavior, but rather as a heuristic for generating testable hypotheses, 2) critical anthropomorphism can—and has—been used to avoid ill-conceived studies of animal behavior, 3) denying our status as animals and that we might share similar experiences of the world with nonhuman species is itself erroneous, and 4) mentalistic explanations of behavior are not, as Wynne suggests, equal to supernatural ones.

== See also ==
- Animal consciousness
