= Personality in animals =

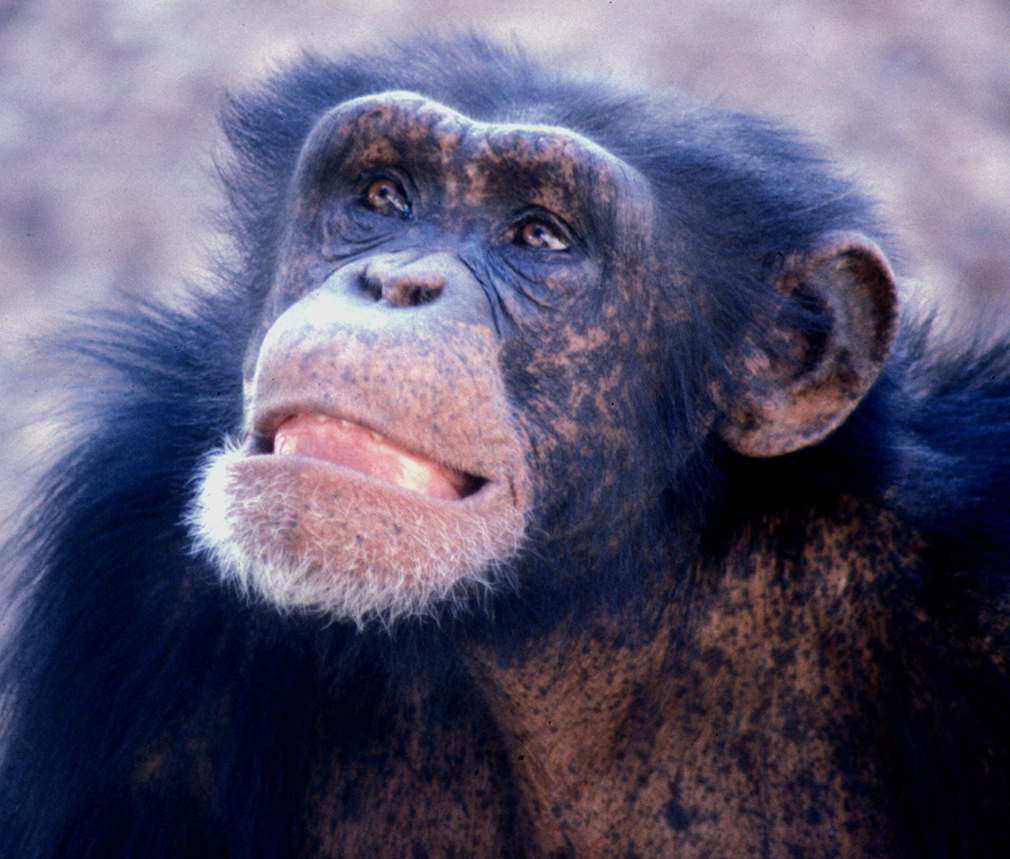
Many animals express individual behavioral traits that are stable over time and context

Personality in animals has been investigated across a variety of different scientific fields including agricultural science, animal behaviour, anthropology, psychology, veterinary medicine, and zoology. Thus, the definition for animal personality may vary according to the context and scope of study. However, there is recent consensus in the literature for a broad definition that describes animal personality as individual differences in behaviour that are consistent across time and ecological context. Here, consistency refers to the repeatability of behavioural differences between individuals and not a trait that presents itself the same way in varying environments.

Animal personality traits are measurable and are described in over 100 species. Personality in non-human animals has also been referred to as animal disposition, coping style, and temperament. There are also personality norms through the species, often found between sexes. The diversity of animal personality can be compared in cross-species studies, demonstrating its pervasiveness in the evolutionary process of animals. Research on animal personality variation has been burgeoning since the mid 1990s. Recent studies have focused on its proximate causation and the ecological and evolutionary significance of personality in animals.

== Animal personality vs. human personality ==
The extent of personality phenomena considered when examining animal personality is significantly reduced compared to those studied in humans. Concepts such as personal objects, identity, attitudes and life stories are not considered relevant in animals. Similarly, any approach that requires the subject to explain motives, beliefs or feelings is not applicable to the study of animal behaviour.

The study of animal personality is largely based on the observation and investigation of behavioural traits. In an ecological context, traits or 'characters' are attributes of an organism that are shared by members of a species. Traits can be shared by all or only a portion of individuals in a population. For example, studies in animal personality often examine traits such as aggressiveness, avoidance of novelty, boldness, exploration and sociality.

== Background ==
The initial framework used to study animal personality was comparative psychology. The descriptive language used by comparative psychologists in the late nineteenth century often attributed disposition and behavioural tendencies to individual animals in their studies. Many of these reports are the result of researchers anthropomorphizing the animal subjects and did not explicitly examine what is now considered animal personality. However, these studies do represent some of the first instances of scientists reporting individual differences in animal behaviour.

Russian physiologist Ivan Pavlov was one of the first researchers to integrate personality into his research of animal behaviour. In his seminal studies on conditional reflexes, he categorized the behaviour of dogs as Excitable, Lively, Quiet or Inhibited. He linked these personalities to learning ability. The Excitable type, for example, showed signs of strong excitatory conditioning, but a limited ability for the acquisition of inhibitory connections. The Lively type was the most balanced and displayed rapid associative learning, while the Quiet type exhibited consistent but slow learning.

The first study that empirically examined animal personality was done in 1938. Meredith Crawford quantified individual differences in the behaviour of young chimpanzees using a behaviour rating scale. Crawford conducted his research out of the Yale Laboratories of Primate Biology. Since then, psychologists have continued to investigate personality in animals across a wide range of taxa. Meanwhile, the incorporation of animal personality into the fields of ecology and evolution is a relatively new practice. Ecologists began to recognize the importance of individual differences in behaviour near the end of the twentieth century.

== Methods ==
=== Rating of traits ===
Rating traits involve a group of observers that scrutinize the behavioural traits of an individual animal. Observers are typically given a list of characters and/or descriptions to use as a reference for interpreting animal behaviour then use the list to rate the behaviours. The rating method uses observers and data recording instruments.

=== Coding behaviours ===
Researchers will observe how individual animals respond to behavioural tests and code their reactions. This method is typically used in experimental studies in which environmental conditions are heavily manipulated.

=== Behavioural reaction norms ===
As research in animal personality became more prevalent in ecological studies many behavioural ecologists were substituting behavioural plasticity for animal personality. That is, attributing variation in behaviour to diverse personality types rather than plasticity in a single behavioural trait. Thus, behavioural reaction norms were introduced as a means of incorporating personality and individual plasticity in the study of animal behaviour. Behavioural reaction norms measure the behaviour of an individual over an environmental gradient, therefore providing information on how an animal behaves on average and how their behaviour changes across an environmental gradient.

=== Repeatability ===
Repeatability refers to the fraction of variation in a population that is owed to differences between individuals. Repeatability estimates are one of the most widely used statistical tools that can quantify consistent individual differences in behaviour. Formally,
$$r = \left ( \frac{S_A ^2}{S_A ^2 + S^2} \right )$$
where, $S_A^2$ is variance among individuals and $S^2$ is the variance within individuals over time. In a meta-analysis of published, peer-reviewed repeatability estimates, reviewers found that, in general, approximately 35% of behavioural variation among individuals could be attributed to individual differences.

== Five Factor Model ==
The Five Factor Model, or the Big Five personality trait model, has been used to assign personality archetypes to some animals. The 5 categories for the five factor model for personality are openness to experience, conscientiousness, extraversion, agreeableness, and neuroticism. Each of these categories identifies personality factors at the broadest level of abstraction. Because the assessment of personality using the five factor model is often a self-reported measure for humans, applying this model to animals can be difficult to standardize. Researchers often measure personality by assessing the behavior of the being over a period of time to establish the pattern. Naturally, some animals may not have as wide a range of personality as humans do. The species of the animal determines how the personality manifests itself. Likewise, a species may be predisposed to exhibit a category of personality more than other categories. So far, chimpanzees are the only animal shown to exhibit conscientiousness. Chimpanzees are also the only non-human species shown to demonstrate a hierarchical structure of personality, with two dimensions of affect corresponding to negative and positive emotionality, and a third dimension of disinhibition (vs. constraint), which is thought to comprise a regulatory system that is known to play a role in the perception and interpretation of incoming stimuli.

Neuroticism, agreeableness and extraversion are the most commonly found personality traits among measured animals. For example, chimpanzees show emotional stability, agreeableness and surgency, audiovisual reactivity, affect-extraversion, excitability-agitation, aggression, affinity and social play.

== Correlated traits and behaviors ==
Some behaviors are correlated into a set of personality traits that remain constant throughout different situations and contexts. These traits are referred to as behavioral syndromes. For example, the aggressiveness-boldness syndrome refers to the correlation between an individual's aggressiveness with conspecifics and boldness in novel environments.

Many correlated behaviours are species specific. For instance, a study in 2014 reported that for horses, personality (quantified using a validated questionnaire) and tolerance to pain (using a Likert scale) indicated that neuroticism is negatively related to stoicism whereas extroversion was positively related to levels of expressed lameness. This suggests that pain may be more easily identified in highly extrovert horses. In zebrafish (Danio rerio), Proactive and Reactive personalities express different thermal preferences and general activity within the temperature gradient. Proactive fish (more aggressive, bold risk-takers, prone to routine formation) have a preference for higher temperature environments. Reactive fish (shy, less risk-prone, more flexible) favor medium colder temperatures.

== Evolutionary potential ==
The degree of variation in a population has been determined to influence the direction and outcome of natural selection. Most scientific research has focused on genetic and phenotypic variation or differences in resource use; however, variation in consistent behaviours (i.e. personality) also has important evolutionary consequences. For example, personality in animals can affect the way individuals interact with their environment and with each other which can affect the relative fitness of individuals. Therefore, personality can influence selection. Also, behavioural traits are more dynamic which may allow an animal to adapt more quickly which, in turn, can speed up the rate of evolution.

Further, natural or artificial selection cannot act on personality unless there is a mechanism for its inheritance. In rhesus macaques (Maccaca mulatta), the personality traits of Meek, Bold, Aggressive, Passive, Loner and Nervous have heritability values of 0.14 to 0.35, thus indicated that there is some genetic basis to the expression of personality traits in animals. In apes, including humans, heritability estimates of personality dimensions range from 0.07 to 0.63. In horses, heritability estimates range mostly between h^{2}=0.15 and h^{2}=0.40 for traits assessed in personality tests. Values at this level are considered as "promising" for artificial selection.

== Examples ==
Personality in animals has been studied across a wide array of taxa. Some of these studies have investigated personality in mammals, elasmobranchs, reptiles, fish and birds.

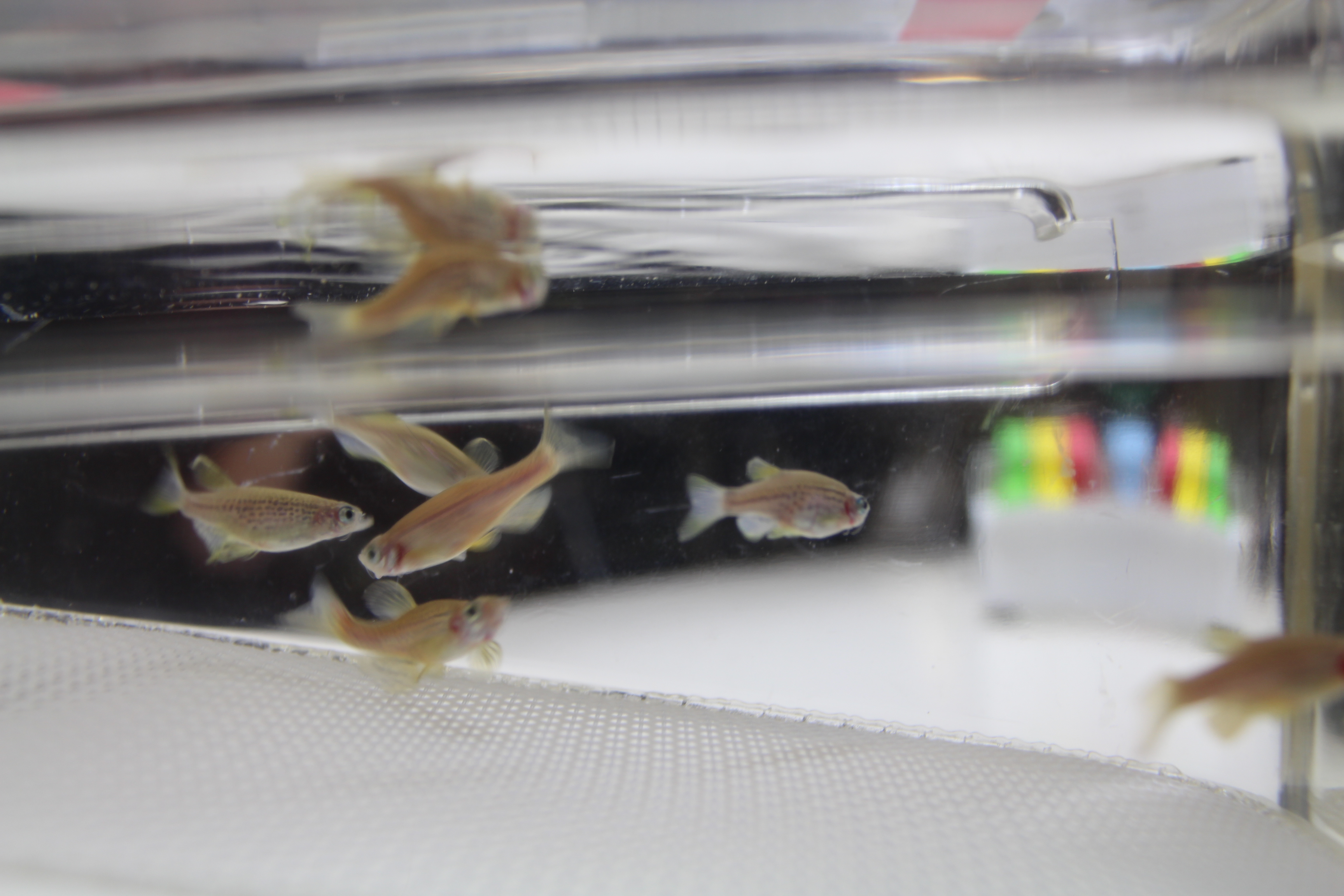
Zebrafish in Fish Laboratory, Weizmann Institute.

There have been several studies that have either been notable in that they have changed scientific understandings of animal personality or have applications in the field of human personality. For example, the study of personality in chimpanzees by King and Figueredo in 1997 was one of the first studies to apply the five-factor model in animal personality. It demonstrated the existence of personality traits in animals and provided a foundation for similar assessment strategies in future studies of personality in animals. Similarly, zebrafish have been used as a neurobehavioral model species for studying personality using the trait approach in non-human animals. These studies can then be translated to study personality development and personality disorders in humans.

Another general example is the spider Anelosimus studiosus. This spider forms groups in which some females show an aggressive personality type and engage more in colony defense and prey capture, while others are docile and engage more in brood care. Groups containing both these two different personalities have better fitness than groups of only one personality type. This is because aggressive females are more efficient at foraging, web construction and defense, while docile females are better at raising the young. When groups contain a mix of both personalities, overall group performance is improved benefiting all group members. In the social spider Stegodyphus dumicola individuals differ in their boldness, with bolder individuals having a greater risk appetite. Boldness changes were found to relate to social interactions with nest mates, indicating that individual personality is more plastic in groups.

== Criticism ==
Many researchers are critical of the lack of consistency in the terminology surrounding animal personality. For example, temperament, behavioral syndrome, disposition and animal personality have been used interchangeably by some while others maintain that each term has a unique meaning. Additionally, there is some concern that researchers may be misinterpreting the relationship between personality and behavioural plasticity. Behavioural ecologist Niels Dingemanse illustrates that one could erroneously determine that variation in behaviour between individuals exists if the subjects have not been examined across a gradient of ecological contexts, and urges fellow researchers to apply behavioural reaction norms whenever possible. In addition, because of critical anthropomorphism, ethology, and comparative psychology are relatively unknown concepts to the layman, there are critics that question the validity in the claim that animals have a personality schema. There are those that fear that, while assessing behaviors, researchers will project anthropomorphic ratings onto the animals.
