= Judy Stamps =

American Ecology Professor

Judy A. Stamps is a professor emerita and researcher within the Department of Evolution and Ecology at University of California, Davis.

Stamps' research focuses on conservation ecology and ethology. Specifically, her research has centered on behavioral ecology, habitat selection, animal personality, plasticity in lizard communication, and implications of developmental processes for problems in behavioral ecology and conservation biology.

== Education ==
Stamps completed her Bachelor's (BA) at the University of California, Berkeley in 1969, majoring in Zoology. She then continued her studies and completed her Masters of Science (M.Sc.) in 1971 and Doctorate of Philosophy (PhD) in 1974 at the same university.

== Scientific contribution and honors/awards ==
Stamps received the ‘’Distinguished Animal Behaviorist’’ award from the Animal Behavior Society (ABS) in 2007.

She has also received the Allee Award (ABS 1972), Fellow Award (AAAS 1983, ABS 1991), Exemplar Award (ABS 1994), and the Mildred Mathias Award (1999).
