= Judy Trust =

Sierra Leonean charity

The Judy Trust is a Quaker-based charity based in Rokel (near Freetown) in Sierra Leone. Its aims are relieving poverty and preventing violence, starting within this community and working out. Rokel was selected due to its notoriety for violence in the recent Sierra Leone Civil War. The charity aims to provide basic healthcare to the surrounding community, and to this end have built and equipped a clinic as a base for this work.

== History ==
The Judy Trust was formerly part of Quaker Peace Networks West Africa (QPNWA). The charity was set up by Abdul Kamara, who, having refused to fight in the Sierra Leone Civil War, had escaped after much suffering via Ghana to the UK. Having become part of the Quakers, Abdul was to set up QPNWA to help the communities in Sierra Leone that he had been part of. In 2014 the charity split into the Dorothy Peace Centre and the Judy Trust.

The Judy Trust is named after Judy Akinbolu, from the UK, although she worked as a VSO in the 1960s at the University of Science and Technology, Kumasi, Ghana. Judy gave time, effort and resources to the charity until her death in 2013.

== Key Initiatives ==
=== Health Education ===
In 2014 Rokel suffered in the Ebola virus epidemic in West Africa. The Judy Trust provided education to the community in how to prevent Ebola transmission. They also provide education in the prevention of other common diseases in the area such as malaria and cholera.

=== Clinic ===
The charity has built a clinic in Rokel to provide healthcare to the community, which is run by a district nurse. It also hopes to provide family planning.

=== Other ===
Several wells were built while the charity was still under the banner of Quaker Peace Networks West Africa, providing clean water for those in the Rokel community. The charity is also helping to provide Arborloos and mosquito nets.
