= Judy Mbugua =

Ordained Preacher (born 1947)

Judy Wanjiru Mbugua
- Born: 9 November 1947 (age 78); Kenya
- Citizenship: Kenya
- Occupation: Ordained preacher
- Years active: 1991–present
- Known for: Evangelism
- Title: Chair at Pan African Christian Women Alliance

Judy Wanjiru Mbugua (born 9 November 1947) is chair of the Pan African Christian Women Alliance (PACWA) and founder of the Kenyan Ladies Home Care Fellowship (LHCF). A member of the Nairobi Pentecostal Church, she was ordained in 1991.

== Biography ==
Born in central Kenya to middle-class parents, Mbugua dropped out of school when she was 16 and became pregnant. She married Richard Mbugua two years later. She completed high school through a correspondence course, and was trained as a secretary. She then worked in insurance. In 1974, she was baptized, becoming a member of the Nairobi Pentecostal Church.

Mbugua resigned from her insurance job and, together with other Christian women, founded the interdenominational Ladies Home Care Fellowship, which was registered in 1985. As a result of her success, in 1987 she was elected continental coordinator of the Pan African Christian Women Alliance at the fifth General Assembly of the Association of Evangelicals in Africa, held in Lusaka, Zambia. She was ordained by Bishop Kitonga in 1991.

Mbugua has since campaigned for the place of women in the Christian ministry, and has supported the traditional family unit.

== Selected works ==
- Mbugua, Judy (1977). Making a Difference: Christian Women and Politics. Association of Evangelicals.
- Mbugua, Judy (1994). Our time has come. Published on behalf of the World Evangelical Fellowship by Baker Book House. ISBN 978-0-85364-525-2.
- Mbugua, Judy; Kisuke, Connie (1999). Judy - A Second Chance: She Refused to Give Up. Authentic Media. ISBN 978-1-85078-337-4.
