= Winifred Smeaton Thomas =

American anthropologist (1903-1987)

- Born: April 21, 1903; Ann Arbor, Michigan
- Died: May 18, 1987 (aged 84)
- Education: University of Michigan; University of Chicago
- Known for: Cultural anthropology studies of magic and tattooing practices of Arab women in Iraq
- Spouse: Homer Leonard Thomas
- Scientific career
- Workplaces: Field Museum of Natural History; University of Michigan; University of Missouri

Winifred Smeaton Thomas (April 21, 1903 - May 18, 1987) was an anthropologist focused on Near and Middle East cultures. Thomas is well known for studying magic and tattooing practices among Arab women during her fieldwork in Iraq from 1932 to 1935. Thomas also served as a physical anthropologist for the Field Museum on an anthropological expedition to the Near East collecting anthropomorphic data and conducting anthropometry research.

== Early life ==
Winifred Smeaton Thomas was born on April 21, 1903, in Ann Arbor, Michigan. Although Thomas was born in Michigan, she spent most of her childhood in Missouri. In the Michigan Alumnus Thomas is listed as being originally from Columbia, Missouri, rather than Michigan. She attended Stanford University before earning a Bachelor of Arts degree in 1924 from the University of Michigan. Thomas (née Smeaton) was listed in the 1924 Michiganensian, a yearbook released by the University of Michigan, indicating that she was not married when she graduated with her BA. She went on to later marry American archaeologist and art historian Homer Leonard Thomas. Homer Leonard Thomas also worked as a research associate at the University of Michigan and is well known for publishing The archaeological chronology of Northwestern Europe.

Thomas also received a Master of Art degree on May 18, 1927, from the University of Michigan. She worked closely with the Yahuda collection of Islamic manuscripts at the University of Michigan, cataloging 218 manuscripts in the 1931-1932 University of Michigan academic year. She was also involved in cataloging an incomplete copy of Ibn Qudāmah al-Maqdisī's abridgment of Ibn al-Jawzī's Minhāj al-qāṣidīn. Thomas was also listed in the 1931 copy of the Michiganensian, indicating that she was still affiliated with the university after having completed her MA while she was working to catalog manuscripts in the Yahuda collection.

== Fieldwork ==
Thomas conducted fieldwork between 1932 and 1935 in Iraq. This research involved conducting anthropometry research and studying magic and tattooing practices among Arab women. In 1932, Thomas traveled to Baghdad, Iraq, where she lived with the family of Ali Jawdat. Her research related to Arab women was published in New Orient (1936), and her research related to tattooing was published in the American Anthropologist (1937).

In 1934, Thomas participated in an anthropological expedition to the Near East that was sponsored by the Field Museum, to gather comparative anthropometric data from ethnic groups in and around Iraq. In April 1934, members of the Field Museum expedition were guests of Sheik Falih as-Saihud of the Al bu Muhammad in Lower Iraq. Winifred Smeaton Thomas served as a physical anthropologist and specialist on folklore and tattooing on the expedition, working alongside other expedition members, including Henry Field, Assistant Curator and Curator of Physical Anthropology at the Field Museum from 1926 to 1942; Richard Martin, Lady Drowser, S. Y. Showket, Khedoory Muallim, and Yusuf Lazar, a collector of zoological and botanical specimens.

During the expedition, Thomas worked alongside Henry Field to obtain anthropometric data from approximately 600 men and women from April 1 to July 20, 1934. Thomas obtained anthropometric data from the Shammar Beduins and the Albu Mahammad, a Marsh Arab tribe. Field and Thomas obtained head measurements among those living in Aqra, Zakho, Rowandiz, and Sulaimaniya. While obtaining anthropometric data, Thomas questioned the informants about the purpose of the tattooing. She also obtained data from conversations with and observations of professional tattoo artists, including many women in the Baghdad hospital. Thomas utilized the date collected on the expedition when writing an article titled "Tattooing Among the Arabs of Iraq," that was published in the American Anthropologist in 1937. The anthropometric data gathered during the expedition appeared in 1949 in The Anthropology of Iraq.

After the Field Museum expedition, Thomas remained in Baghdad to continue her research and taught an English class in 1934 and 1935 at the Central High School for Girls.

== Professional career ==
After her return to the United States, Thomas published her research in two articles, "Women in Present-Day Iraq" published in the New Orient and "Tattooing Among the Arabs of Iraq" published in the American Anthropologist. In her two publications, Thomas described her observations of male and female separation during her time living with the Jawdat family as well as the duties of Iraqi women of different socioeconomic classes. She also described magic and tattooing practices among Iraqi women, including decorative tattooing and tattooing applied for therapeutic reasons. Thomas also observed changing dress in response to European influence.

Thomas worked to challenge popular western images of Iraqi culture. She wrote how "it is a mistake, however, to consider the segregation of women as a result of Islam, for it is a far older institution." Thomas also worked to dispel the western belief of "rich and influential Moslems [sic] as living in the midst of luxurious well-stocked harems," noting how very few families are polygamous. Thomas worked to dispel western stereotypes about Middle Eastern culture and women.

In 1940, Thomas received a PhD in Anthropology from the University of Chicago. From 1943 to 1945, she worked as a Research Analyst for the U.S War Department, Military Intelligence Division. Thomas also taught a World Literature class at Stephens College in 1952-1953 and served as a Visiting Assistant Professor of Anthropology at the University of Missouri from 1960 to 1962.

Thomas was actively involved in anthropology professional societies and publications. Thomas was involved in the Society of Women Geographers from 1946 to 1950. She attended the American Oriental Society meeting in Baltimore, Maryland in April 1956. From 1954 to 1967, she served as the Associate Editor of Archaeology magazine, published by the Archaeological Institute of America (AIA). And according to the July/August 1979 issues of Archaeology, Thomas was, at the time of publication, serving on the Editorial Advisory Board.

== Later life ==
Winifred Smeaton Thomas died on May 18, 1987. The Winifred Smeaton Thomas papers are housed at the National Anthropological Archives and include her writings, publications, correspondence, field diaries, photographs, passports, and more from her time as a student, a field researcher in Iraq from 1932 to 1935, and her time as a professor at Stevens College and the University of Missouri and her work with the U.S. Military Intelligence during World War II. Thomas's papers were donated by her husband, Homer Leonard Thomas, in 1996.

== Selected bibliography ==
- 1936 "Women in Present-Day Iraq." New Orient: 22-30.
- 1937 "Tattooing Among the Arabs of Iraq." American Anthropologist (1): 53-61.

== See also ==
- Women in Islam
