= Judy Zeh =

American statistician

- Title: Professor emerita

Academic background
- Education: University of Washington

Academic work
- Discipline: Statistics
- Sub-discipline: Population dynamics and population estimation
- Institutions: University of Washington
- Main interests: Bowhead whale populations

Judith E. (Judy) Zeh is an American statistician. She retired from the University of Washington, where she spent her entire career, and is a research professor emerita of statistics at Washington. She is known for her research on bowhead whale populations.

== Research ==
Zeh's research concerns population dynamics and population estimation. She has applied these methods more specifically, in association with the International Whaling Commission, to bowhead whale populations. In this application, she and her collaborator Adrian Raftery became pioneers in the use of Bayesian statistics for population estimation.

In 1999, she was elected for a three year term as chair of the Scientific Committee of the International Whaling Commission. She became the first woman in over 50 years in that position.

== Education and career ==
Zeh was educated entirely at the University of Washington, where she also spent her entire academic career. She graduated with a bachelor's degree in philosophy in 1962, and the next year began working as a computer programmer in Washington's Applied Physics Laboratory, where she remained until 1974.

While employed there, she earned a second bachelor's degree in 1965 in mathematics and numerical analysis, and a master's degree in 1969 in mathematical statistics. From 1975 to 1979, she was a doctoral student in biomathematics; after completing her Ph.D. in 1979, she became a lecturer in electrical engineering, while also working off-campus as a senior statistical analyst at Mathematical Sciences Northwest.

She worked as a postdoctoral researcher, research associate, and lecturer in statistics from 1982 to 1991, when she became a research associate professor in the statistics department, with a joint appointment in the Department of Quantitative Ecology and Resource Management. From 1999 to 2004 she also held an adjunct position on Laboratory Medicine at the University of Washington.

== Recognition ==
In 1998, Zeh was elected as a Fellow of the American Statistical Association.
