= Judy R. Franz =

American physicist

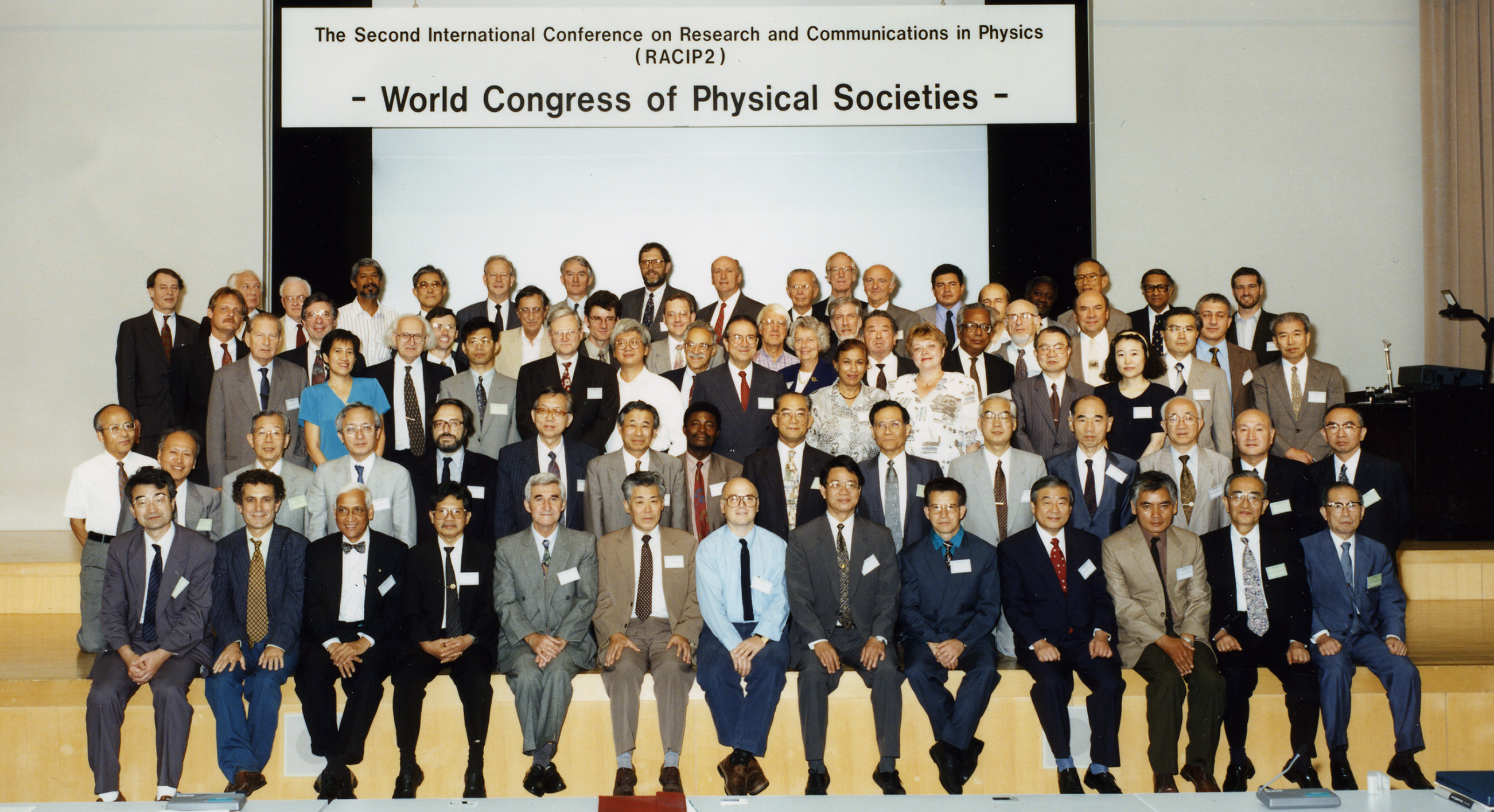
- Franz at the Second International Conference on Research and Communications in Physics
- Education: Cornell University; University of Illinois at Urbana–Champaign
- Known for: Condensed matter physics Physics education
- Spouse: Dr. Frank Franz
- Children: 1
- Scientific career
- Fields: Research Physicist
- Workplaces: American Physical Society; University of Alabama; West Virginia University; Cornell University; Indiana University; IBM Research Laboratories

Judy Franz (born 1938) is an American physicist, educator and the former executive officer of the American Physical Society.

== Biography ==
The daughter of two chemists, Ruth Comroe and Eugene Rosenbaum, she grew up in Lansdowne, Pennsylvania. She received her B.A in physics in 1959 from Cornell University and pursued graduate studies in physics at the University of Illinois where she earned a master's degree in 1961 and a Ph.D. in 1965. Shortly after earning her Ph.D., she worked as a post-doctoral fellow at the IBM research laboratory in Zurich, Switzerland from 1965 to 1967, before returning to America to serve as a physics professor at Indiana University for 18 years. After her time at Indiana University, Franz spent 5 years on the faculty of West Virginia University and three years on the faculty of the University of Alabama in Huntsville. In 1994, she took a five-year leave of absence from her faculty position to assume her position as executive officer of the American Physical Society (APS).

Franz has published a number of high-profile articles on condensed matter physics, most notably related to the theoretical calculations of electron state wave functions in systems undergoing metal-insulator transitions. She was a key advocate for improving physics education, and has received the Melba Newell Phillips Medal for Creative Leadership in Physics Education from the American Association of Physics Teachers. She served as executive officer of the American Physical Society for 15 years, encouraging more women to pursue careers in physics. She is past Secretary General of the International Union of Pure and Applied Physics. She is now retired.
