= Judie =

Judie is a variant spelling of Judy or Judi. As such, it is a feminine personal name which is sometimes a given name, but more commonly a hypocorism (affectionate diminutive). When a hypocorism, it is usually a shortening of the given name Judith.

In Arabic pronunciation, "Judie" is rendered as "جودي" (pronounced Jūdī), which may phonetically resemble the Arabic word "كرمى" (karamī), meaning "my generosity." However, the two terms are unrelated etymologically.

== See also ==
- Judy (disambiguation)
- Judy (personal name)
- Judi
- Judith (disambiguation)
