= Judy Cannato =

Judy Cannato was an American Catholic author, retreat facilitator, and spiritual director. Educated at Ohio University and John Carroll University with master's degrees in education and religious studies, she was an associate member of the Congregation of St. Joseph and maintained an office at River's Edge, a ministry of the Sisters of St. Joseph in Cleveland, Ohio.Married with two grown sons, Cannato concentrated on the relationship between science and religion in her retreats and writings. Judith Cannato died from a rare form of cancer on May 7, 2011, at the age of 62.

== Bibliography ==
- Fields of Compassion: How the New Cosmology Is Transforming Spiritual Life, Sorin Books 2010 ISBN 978-1-933495-21-7
- Radical Amazement: Contemplative Lessons from Black Holes, Supernovas, and Other Wonders of the Universe, Sorin Books 2006 ISBN 978-1-893732-99-5
- Quantum Grace: Lenten Reflections on Creation and Connectedness, Ave Maria Press 2003 ISBN 978-0-87793-984-9
- Quantum Grace: The Sunday Readings, Ave Maria Press 2003 ISBN 978-1-59471-024-7
