= Judy Hahn =

American volleyball coach

Judy Hahn was the head coach of women's volleyball at Malone College in Canton, Ohio from 1981 to 1984. While at Malone, she compiled a record of 126 wins and 33 losses.

== Coaching awards ==
Hahn was named the NAIA District IV Coach of the Year while at Malone.

== Personal life ==
Hahn graduated from Muskingum College with a bachelor's degree and earned a master's degree from Ashland University.
