= Clive Wynne =

British-Australian ethologist

Clive D. L. Wynne
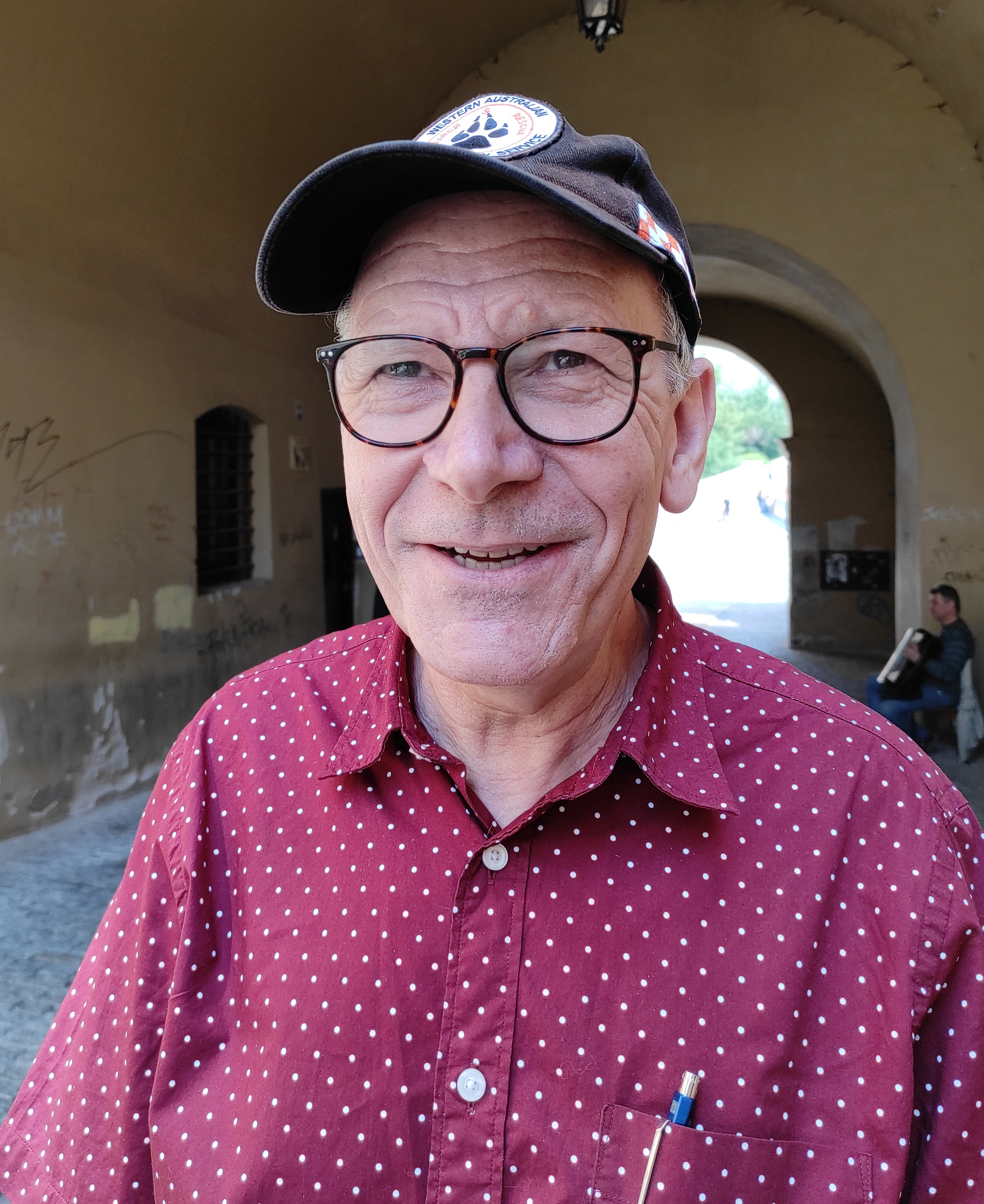
- Clive Wynne, 2023
- Born: 1961 (age 64–65); Isle of Wight, England
- Citizenship: British; Australian
- Education: University College London (BSc); University of Edinburgh (PhD, 1986)
- Scientific career
- Fields: Ethology, Animal cognition

Clive D. L. Wynne (born 1961) is a British-Australian ethologist specializing in the behavior of dogs and their wild relatives. He has worked in the United States, Australia, and Europe, and is currently based at Arizona State University in Tempe, AZ. He was born and raised on the Isle of Wight, off the south coast of England, studied at University College London, and got his Ph.D. at Edinburgh University. He has studied the behavior of many species - ranging from pigeons to dunnarts, but starting around 2006 melded his childhood love of dogs with his professional training and now studies and teaches about the behavior of dogs and their wild relatives.

== Education and career ==
Wynne was educated at schools on the Isle of Wight including the now defunct Sandown High School, studied for his B.Sc. in Human Sciences at University College London, where he was influenced by the evolutionary psychologist Henry Plotkin. Wynne obtained his Ph.D. in Psychology for a dissertation on the behavior of barbary (turtle) doves at Edinburgh University in 1986. After time as a post-doc at the Ruhr-Universitat Bochum, Duke University, and the Universität Konstanz, where he was mentored by John Staddon and Juan Delius, Wynne's first faculty position was at the University of Western Australia. In 2002 Wynne moved to the University of Florida, and he came to Arizona State University in 2013 where he founded the Canine Science Collaboratory.

== Research interests ==
Wynne's earlier research focused on the cognitive abilities of pigeons (e.g., Wynne et al. 1992; Wynne 1997), as well as their perception of arbitrary short time intervals (e.g., Wynne et al. 1996). In Australia, Wynne studied the learning abilities of two species of marsupial, the fat-tailed dunnart (Sminthopsis crassicaudata) and the quokka (Setonix brachyurus) (e.g., Bonney and Wynne 2002a; 2002b) and he is known for his opposition to anthropomorphism in the understanding of animal cognition (e.g., Wynne 2004).

The specific focus of Wynne's ongoing research is the behaviour of dogs and their wild relatives. In this domain his group studies the ability of pet dogs to react adaptively to the behaviours of the people they live with; the deployment of applied behaviour analytic techniques to the treatment of problem behaviours in dogs; the behaviours of shelter dogs that influence their chances of adoption into human homes; improved methods for training sniffer dogs; the development of test banks for studying cognitive aging in pet dogs; and humans as social enrichment for captive canids.

In 2017 Wynne and his collaborators organized the inaugural Canine Science Conference in Tempe, AZ - the first of its kind in North America.

== Books ==
- Animal Cognition: The Mental Lives of Animals (Palgrave)
- Do Animals Think? (Princeton University Press)
- Animal Cognition: Evolution, Behavior, and Cognition (Palgrave Macmillan))
- Dog Is Love: Why and How Your Dog Loves You (Houghton Mifflin Harcourt)
