= Judy Porter =

New Zealand footballer

Personal information
- Full name: Judith Porter
- Position: Defender

International career
Years	Team	Apps	(Gls)
1979	New Zealand	1	(0)

Judith Porter is a former association football player who represented New Zealand at international level.

Porter made a single appearance for Football Ferns in a 2–2 draw with Australia on 6 October 1979.
