= Judy Klitsner =

Bible scholar

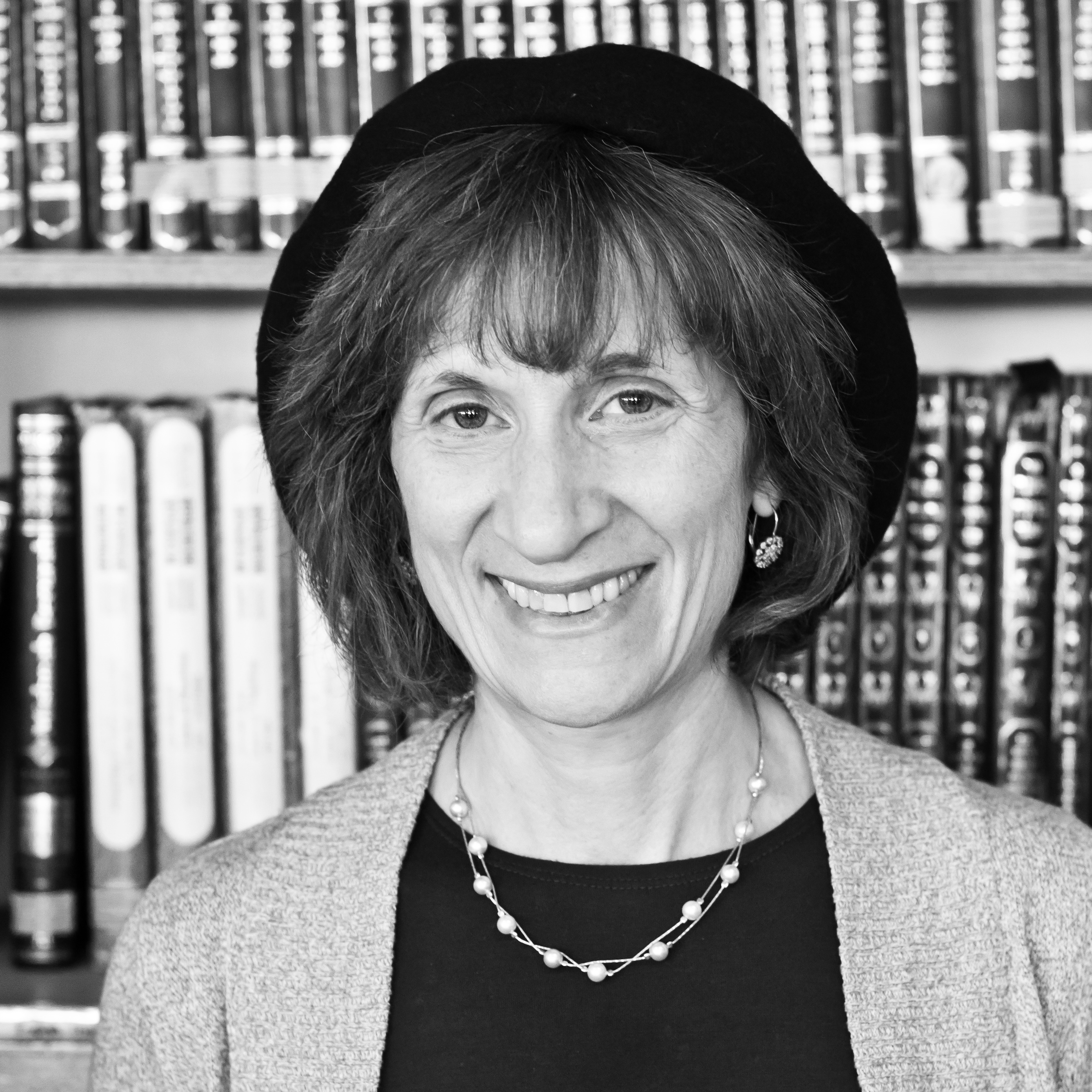
Judy Klitsner

Judy Klitsner (born 1957) is a contemporary Bible scholar, author and international speaker. She is a senior faculty member of the Pardes Institute for Jewish Studies in Jerusalem, where she has taught Bible and biblical exegesis for more than twenty years. Klitsner studied under Torah teacher Nechama Leibowitz. Her writings on biblical commentary combine traditional Jewish exegesis with modern biblical scholarship and close textual analysis.

Klitsner lectures widely at synagogues and academic institutions. Venues have included Harvard University, Brown University, the Graduate Theological Union at UC Berkeley, Yeshivat Chovevei Torah, Hebrew College, the Jewish Theological Seminary of America, the University of Judaism, Drisha, Mechon Hadar, Limmud, JOFA, the 92nd Street Y, and the Skirball Center.

Klitsner is the author of many articles and of the book, Subversive Sequels in the Bible: How Biblical Stories Mine and Undermine Each Other published in hardcover by the Jewish Publication Society in October 2009 and in softcover by Koren Publishers Jerusalem in January 2011.

== Awards ==
Subversive Sequels in the Bible received a 2009 National Jewish Book Award in the Scholarship category.

== Selected works ==
- Subversive sequels in the Bible : how biblical stories mine and undermine each other , 2008
- Inside-outside : Biblical leaders and their non-Jewish mentors, 2017
