= Judy Balan =

Comedy writer and author

- Born: 2 September 1981 (age 44) Madras (now Chennai), Tamil Nadu, India
- Genre: Comedy

Website
- www.judybalan.com

Judy Balan (born 2 September 1981), is a comedy writer and author who debuted with the bestselling novel Two Fates: The Story of My Divorce, a parody of Chetan Bhagat's Two States: The Story of My Marriage. She is also the author of the blog Woman and a Quarter.

== Early life and education ==
Balan was born in Chennai, India.

Balan completed her schooling at the Good Shepherd Convent, Chennai and Sacred Heart, Church Park, in Chennai. She pursued a bachelor's degree in English Literature at Stella Maris, Chennai, India and worked at advertising agencies before becoming a full-time writer.

== Career ==
Judy Balan is the author of Two Fates: The Story of My Divorce (published by Westland in Dec 2011) Sophie Says: Memoirs of a Breakup Coach (published by Westland in May 2013), How to Stop Your Grownup From Making Bad Decisions (Book #1 in the Nina the Philosopher series published by HarperCollins, India and HarperCollins, USA in Feb 2016 and HarperCollins UK in June 2016), Tweenache in the Time of Hashtags (Book #2 in the Nina the Philosopher series) and Half Boyfriend - a parody of Chetan Bhagat's Half Girlfriend. She writes comedy across mediums and used to blog at Woman and a Quarter.

== Family ==
Balan lives in Chennai.
