= Ed Robb =

American politician

Member of the Missouri House of Representatives from the 24th district
- In office 2004–2008
- Succeeded by: Chris Kelly

Ed Robb (July 1, 1942 – September 24, 2011) was a member of the faculty at the University of Missouri, the president of a consulting firm, and a Republican member of the Missouri House of Representatives. He resided in Columbia, Missouri, with his wife, Rosa. They have five children: Shawn, Melissa, Tom, David, and Adam.

He was born in Chicago, Illinois to Howard Robb and Georgia Field Robb, graduating from Elmwood Park High School in Chicago in 1960. He went on to receive a B.S. degree in Economics from Bradley University in 1964, and an M.S. and, later, a Ph.D. in Economics, both from Michigan State University.

He was the past Director of the College of Business and Public Administration Research Center, the Economic Policy and Analysis Research Center, and the State and Fiscal Studies Unit, all of University of Missouri-Columbia. Until his death in 2011, he was the President of Edward H. Robb and Associates, a consulting firm. He was also a member of the Open Door Baptist Church in Columbia, and of the Columbia Chamber of Commerce.

He was first elected to the Missouri House of Representatives in 2004, and was a member of the following committees:

- Appropriations-Education,
- Budget (Vice-Chair),
- Elementary and Secondary Education,
- Ways and Means,
- Special Committee on Education Funding, and
- Joint Committee on Education.

In November, 2008, he was defeated in the 24th District by Democrat Chris Kelly. In November 2010 he was elected Presiding County Commissioner of Boone County Missouri and sworn into that office in January 2011. On the evening of September 24, 2011 he suffered a heart attack and died.

In 2012, the Boone County Republican Party established a non-partisan honor in Robb's name, the Dr. Edward Robb Boone County Public Servant of the Year Award. Given annually, the award recognizes "outstanding service by an employee of any city, county or public entity in Boone County.".
