= Linda Bullock =

American nursing professor

Linda Faye Clark Bullock
- Born: 1950 (age 75–76)
- Education: Texas Woman's University; University of Otago
- Medical career
- Institutions: University of Otago; University of Missouri; University of Virginia

Linda Faye Clark Bullock (born 1950) is an American professor of nursing.

== Education ==
Bullock received a bachelor's and master's degree in nursing from Texas Woman's University. She completed a doctor of philosophy in public health at University of Otago.

== Career ==
Bullock worked with professors Judith McFarlane and Barbara Parker to investigate the consequences of physical abuse during pregnancy. Bullock showed that low birth weights were associated with abuse. Together they created tools that are used by researchers who are investigating abuse during pregnancy.

Bullock was the first nurse faculty member at Christchurch School of Medicine. She joined the faculty at University of Missouri Sinclair School of Nursing in 1997. She became a nursing professor in 2003. In January 2010, she was appointed as the director of the doctor of philosophy in nursing. In 2010, she joined the faculty at University of Virginia School of Nursing as the first Jeanette Lancaster Alumni Professor of Nursing, a funded chair.

== Awards and honors ==
Bullock is a Fellow of the American Academy of Nursing.
