= Judy Barden =

British journalist (1911–1996)

- Born: 1911
- Died: 1996 (aged 84–85)
- Occupation: journalist
- Known for: Warned American women that their husbands, sons and brothers morals were at risk from advances from German women
- Spouse: David M. Nichol (Chicago Daily News)

Judy Barden (1911-1996) was a journalist from the United Kingdom who lived and worked in the United States.

She worked as a war correspondent during World War II for the New York Sun and the North American Newspaper Alliance. On October 9, 1948, in Berlin she married David M. Nichol (Chicago Daily News), a journalist who also worked as a war correspondent and was posted to some of the same locations.

Together with Dixie Tighe she lobbied for permission to cover the Invasion of Normandy by parachute jumping with airborne troops. This opportunity had been offered to male war correspondents, most of whom declined. Barden and Tighe were turned down, being told that the jolt of the opening parachute could damage their reproductive organs.

Following Germany's defeat Barden wrote multiple articles warning that the occupying troops morals were at risk from sexual advances from beautiful, sexually available, German women.

Secretary of War Robert P. Patterson honored war correspondents, including Barden, at an event in Washington, on November 23, 1946.
