= Judy Bolch =

American academic

Dorothy Judith Bolch (born February 23, 1942) is an American journalist and the first Houston Harte Chair in Journalism at the University of Missouri. Bolch has won awards for her writing and editing at The Raleigh Times and The News & Observer, both based in Raleigh, NC. She was managing editor/enterprise at The News & Observer in 1997, when she joined the faculty of the University of Missouri and became the first Houston Harte Chair. Until her retirement in September 2008, Bolch was Teaching Editor at the Columbia Missourian, which is staffed by Missouri School of Journalism students who work under the direction of professional editors.

In the classroom, Bolch specialized in new media and served as a writing coach. She previously taught writing at Duke University in Durham, NC, and North Carolina State University in Raleigh, NC. Judy Bolch is also co-author with Kay Miller of the textbook Investigative and In-Depth Reporting (Hastings House Pub, 1978).
