= Judi Donaghy =

American singer-songwriter

- Born: October 14, 1960 (age 65); Erlanger, Kentucky, U.S.
- Origin: Twin Cities, Minnesota, U.S.
- Genres: Jazz, folk, vocal
- Occupations: Vocalist, producer, songwriter, music educator
- Instrument: Vocals

Judi Donaghy (born October 14, 1960) is an American vocalist, producer and songwriter from the Twin Cities, as well as a music educator at the former McNally Smith College of Music, as well as a popular jazz performer. She is noted for her work with The Girls, the Wolverines Big Band and most notably as a member of Bobby McFerrin's Voicestra.

== Biography ==
Donaghy was born in Erlanger, Kentucky, and began her career as a folk singer. Upon hearing the Wolverines Big Band, she began to include jazz in her focus. She obtained her BM in Vocal Performance from the University of Nebraska–Lincoln and her masters in music education at the University of Minnesota. She was an instructor and department head at McNally Smith College of Music starting in 1994.

Her vocal group, The Girls, consists of Lori Dokken, Patty Peterson, Erin Schwab. Among the years, she has also worked with Yo Yo Ma, Carole King, Janis Siegel (of Manhattan Transfer fame), Debbie Duncan, Rhiannon, Julee Cruise, Garrison Keillor and Marilyn McCoo. She recently completed her 4th European tour with Voicestra.

She has received acclaim from JAZZIZ Magazine for her songwriting, and from the Schubert Club, becoming the first non-classical performer to represent them. She has sung on more than 30 CDs to date, has performed as an on-air talent, and her original work has been covered by several local artists. She is the choral director at the Unity Christ Church in Golden Valley, Minnesota, and has given vocal master classes and clinics with Bobby McFerrin at the Omega Institute and the Stimmen Voice Festival in Basel, Switzerland.

She has performed at various venues, including Carnegie Hall, Orchestra Hall (Minneapolis), Northrop Opera and the Mixed Blood Theatre. She performs frequently at the Dakota Jazz Club, Times Bar & Café, and The Townhouse.

== Solo discography ==
- Sink or Swing (1996)
- Ballads and Bossas (2001)
- Swing On! [Live] (2009)

== Featured Discography ==
- Old Friends [Live] / Lori Dokken (1995)
- Unity [Live] / Various Artists (1998)
- Before I Was Born / David Haas (2000)
- Requests / The Girls (2002)
- Echo of Faith / David Haas (2002)
- Welcome Christmas / Philip Brunelle (2004)
- Live at the Dakota [Live] / The Girls (2005)
- Girls Night Out: Vol. 1 - "Dance All Night" / Various Artists (2004)
- McNally Smith Christmas Sampler / Various Artists (2007)
- Voracious [Live] / The Wolverines Big Band (2007)
- VOCAbularies / Bobby McFerrin (2010)
