= Judy's =

American clothing store chain

Logo of Judy's

Judy's was a chain of clothing stores, based in Van Nuys, Los Angeles. Marcia Israel (Mrs. Lawrence Israel, later Marcia Israel-Curley) founded Judy's in 1946 and ran it until 1989 when she sold it to Laws International of Hong Kong for $31 million. Israel-Curley died in 2004.

== Fashion ==
Judy's sold sportswear and fashion accessories, the women's stores catering to juniors: slim-cut, trendy styles.

In the late 1940s, Israel wrote, there were generally no boutiques catering exclusively for juniors and hardly any clothing companies producing styles for the juniors market. Israel wrote that she developed numerous groundbreaking concepts that were copied by other designers and retailers, such as the short-sleeve sweater and workmen's five-pocket jeans for casual use (accessorized with Ked's sneakers) by women.

Israel was long considered a fashion authority; for example a 1970 interview in the Los Angeles Times around the topic of longer hemlines for women's skirts. Israel confirmed that longer midi skirt hemlines were "flourishing", though the lower hemlines "should not be forced; they must ripen like fruit". The Judy's "empire" was considered a "bellwether by great numbers of astute fashion people", according to the Times.

== Development of stores ==
Israel began the chain in January, 1946 in a 7-by-12-foot space (84 sq. ft.) carved out of a movie theater lobby on Whittier Boulevard in East Los Angeles. She proceeded to open a 360-square-foot store in 1948 in Compton, an 800-square-foot store on May 9, 1949, on Lankershim Boulevard in North Hollywood, and in 1952, a 3,500-square-foot store in the new Lakewood Center, the United States' first fully-enclosed mall. The chain continued to expand, including the opening of a 6,300-square-foot (590 m^{2}) store in Century City Shopping Center in July 1965, expanded in 1968 to 16,000 square feet (1,500 m^{2})which it considered its flagship store. By 1970, there were 17 Judy's.

The chain at its peak it had 107 stores. In 1989, it operated 70 women's clothing stores and 34 "GHq" men's clothing stores in California and a handful in four other Western states.

== Epilogue ==
In 1993 the chain declared bankruptcy, disposed of the GHq men's chain and relaunched with a slimmed-down 52-store branch network. New owner Rampage was in the process of converting Judy's stores to the Rampage name when it went bankrupt itself in 1997. Retailer Charlotte Russe purchased Rampage, and in 2006 sold most store leases and fixtures to Forever 21, while converting 4 remaining locations to Charlotte Russe branches.
