= Juden (disambiguation) =

Juden may refer to:

== People ==
- German for Jews (plural form of Jude)

=== Persons ===
- Brian Juden (1920–2008), British scholar of French
- Jeff Juden (born 1971), U.S. baseball player
- John Juden, an early settler of Cape Girardeau County, Missouri, USA; namesake of Juden Creek
- Janis Judens (1884–1918), Latvian commander in the Red Army during the Russian Civil War

=== Characters ===
- Jū-den (Japanese: 充電, romanized: Juu-den, lit. 'Charger'), a character class in the anime/manga franchise Juden Chan

== Places ==
- Juden Creek, Cape Girardeau County, Missouri, USA; a creek

== See also ==
- Judenfrei
- Judea
- Judah (disambiguation)
- Jude (disambiguation) (German: Jew)
- Juif (French: Jew (m.))
- Juive (French: Jew (f.))
- Jew (disambiguation)
