= St. Jude (disambiguation) =

St. Jude, or Jude the Apostle, was one of the Twelve Apostles of Jesus.

St. Jude, St. Jude's, or St. Judes, or variants, may also refer to:

== People ==
- Jude, brother of Jesus
- St. Jude, the author of the Epistle of Jude
- Jude Milhon (1939–2003), pseudonym St. Jude, hacker and author

== Arts and entertainment ==
- Saint Jude (band), a British rock band
- St. Jude (album), by the Courteeners, 2008
- "St. Jude" (song), a 2015 song by Florence and the Machine
- St. Jude, a fictional town in The Corrections

== Businesses and organisations ==
=== Hospitals and medical ===
- St. Jude Children's Research Hospital, in Memphis, Tennessee, US
- St. Jude Medical, a medical device company
- St. Jude Medical Center, in Fullerton, California, US
- St. Jude India, an organisation providing treatment for children with cancer

=== Education ===
- St. Jude's Elementary, a school in Vancouver, Canada
- St. Jude's Public School & Junior College, a school in Kotagiri, India
- St Jude High School (Pune), Maharashtra, India
- St. Jude College Dasmariñas Cavite, a college in the Philippines
- Saint Jude College, a college of nursing in Manila, Philippines
- Saint Jude Catholic School (Manila), Philippines
- School of St Jude, in Arusha, Tanzania
- St. Jude Educational Institute, a high school in Montgomery, Alabama, US
- Saint Jude School (Monroe, Connecticut), US

== Churches ==
- St. Jude's Church (disambiguation), several uses
- St. Jude's Cathedral (disambiguation), several uses

== Places ==
- St. Judes, Newfoundland and Labrador, Canada
- St Jude's, Bristol, England
- City of St. Jude, a campus in Montgomery, Alabama, US

== Sports ==
- St. Jude Championship, a golf tournament on the PGA Tour
- St. Jude Classic, a golf tournament in Memphis, Tennessee, US
- St Jude's GAA, a Gaelic Athletic Association club in Templeogue, Dublin, Ireland

== Other uses ==
- St. Jude storm, a 2013 storm in northwestern Europe

== See also ==
- Judah (disambiguation)
- Judas (disambiguation)
- Jude (disambiguation)
- "The Gospel of St Jude", a 1996 song by Orchestral Manoeuvres in the Dark from Universal
