= Jude =

Jude may refer to:

== People ==
- Jude (given name), including a list of biblical figures, real people, and fictional characters
- Jude (surname), including a list of people with the name

== Arts and entertainment ==
- Jude the Obscure, an 1895 novel by Thomas Hardy
  - Jude (film), a film based on the Hardy novel
- The Judes, a Canadian band
- Jude (album), by Julian Lennon, 2022
- Der Jude (German: The Jew), a 1916–1928 German periodical

== Other uses ==
- Epistle of Jude, a book of the New Testament of the Bible
- St. Jude storm, 2013 weather storm in Europe
- astah*, formerly known as JUDE, a software modeling and diagramming tool

In german language, Jude is a masculine form of Jew

== See also ==
- Jew (disambiguation)
- Judah (disambiguation)
- Judas (disambiguation)
- Juden (disambiguation)
- Jute (disambiguation)
- St. Jude (disambiguation)
- Armand-Jude River, a river in Quebec, Canada
- "Hey Jude", a song by the band the Beatles
- Județ, an administrative division in Romania
- Jutes, an Anglo-Saxon tribe
