= Juve =

Juve may refer to:

== Sports clubs ==
- Juve, a short name for sports clubs named "Juventus"
- Juve, the short name of Juventus FC, association football club based in Turin, Italy; it can also refer to:
  - Juventus F.C. (women), women's team of Juventus F.C.
  - Juventus Next Gen, men's reserve team of Juventus F.C.
  - Juventus F.C. Youth Sector, youth system of Juventus F.C.
- S.S. Juve Stabia, an Italian football club from Castellammare di Stabia, Campania
- JuveCaserta Basket, an Italian basketball club from Caserta, Campania
- FC Juve Maasmechelen, a Belgian football club from Maasmechelen, Limburg
- Juve Lis, a Portuguese handball club
- BC Juventus (Juvė)

== People with the name ==
- Arthur E. Juve (1901–1965), American chemical engineer
- Jørgen Juve (1906–1983), Norwegian football player, jurist, and writer
- Torger Juve (1840–?), American politician

== See also ==
- Juvy
- Juive
- Juvee
- JuVee Productions
- Juvie (disambiguation)
- Juvenile (disambiguation)
- Juventus (disambiguation)
- Jew (disambiguation)
