= Jew (disambiguation) =

A Jew is a member of the Jewish people.

Jew or JEW may also refer to:

== Places in the United States ==
- Jew Mountain, a mountain in Montana
- Jew Peak, a mountain in Montana
- Jew Point, a cape in Florida
- Jew Valley, a basin in Oregon

== People ==
- Ed Jew (born 1960), American politician
- Sollie Cohen (1907–1966), American college football player nicknamed "Jew"

== Arts and entertainment ==
=== Films ===
- The Jew (film) (Portuguese: O judeu), a 1995 historical film
- The Jews (film) (French: Ils sont partout), a 2016 comedy film

=== Music ===
- Jimmy Eat World, an American rock band

=== Literature ===
- The Jew, a 1794 play by Richard Cumberland
- "The Jew" (short story) (Russian: Zhid), an 1847 short story by Ivan Turgenev
- The Jews (play) (German: Die Juden), a 1754 play
- The Jews, a 1922 book by Hilaire Belloc
- The Jews (Japanese: Yudaya-jin), 1986 book by Kazuo Ueda

== Other uses ==
- Jew (word), a term passed into the English language from Greek
- The Jew (periodical), published by Solomon Henry Jackson
- Jew (house), an Asmat traditional house

== See also ==
- Der Jude (The Jew) (1916–1928), a periodical founded by Martin Buber
- Judah (disambiguation)
- Jiu (disambiguation)
- Joo (disambiguation)
- Ju (disambiguation)
- Juju, objects and spells used in religious practice, as part of witchcraft in West Africa
- Joos (disambiguation)
- Jou (disambiguation)
