= Juvie =

Juvie or juvies commonly refer to:

- Juvenile (organism), a juvie
- Juvenile hall (the juvie), a youth detention center
- Juvenile delinquent (a juvie), a minor person detained there

Juvie or juvies may also refer to:

== Stage and screen ==
- Juvies (TV series), a 2007 U.S. MTV reality TV show
- "Juvies", a 1999 episode of the U.S. TV show Pacific Blue; see List of Pacific Blue episodes
- Juvies, a 2000 film by Liz Garbus
- Juvies, a 2004 film by Mark Wahlberg; see Mark Wahlberg filmography

== People and fictional characters ==
=== Given name Juvie ===
- Juvie Colonia, a Philippine volleyball player who participated in the NCAA Season 93 volleyball tournaments
- Juvie Mangaring, a Philippine volleyball player; see List of Premier Volleyball League Champions
- Juvie Mark Mangulabnan, a Philippine volleyball player; see List of Spikers' Turf players

=== Nickname or stagename Juvie ===
- Rob "Juvie" Stewart, a member of the Irish-American mob, part of the K&A Gang
- Brycyn "Juvie" Evans, U.S. singer, who appeared in the 2000 song "My Getaway"
- Juvie, a South Korean rapper featured on "Cassanova" from the 2012 Leessang album Unplugged
- Juvie Train, a South Korean rapper featured on "Surviver" from the 2009 Leessang album Baekajeolhyeon

=== Characters ===
- Juvies, a character class from the videogame Gears of War 4
- Juvie, a fictional character from the 2017 Philippine film Gandarrapiddo: The Revenger Squad

== Literature ==
- Juvies, a 2007 South African comic book by Jarred Cramer
- The Juvies, a 1961 short story anthology by Harlan Ellison; see Harlan Ellison bibliography
- Juvie, a book by Paul Kropp

== Other ==
- Juvie, a brand name used by Juvenile (rapper)
- "Juvie", a 2009 song by Birds of Prey off the album The Hellpreacher
- Juvie Day, a fictional holiday in the 2011 U.S. TV show Beaver Falls (TV series)

== See also ==
- Juvy (disambiguation)
- Juive
- Juvee
- JuVee Productions
- Juvenile (disambiguation)
- Juve (disambiguation)
- Jew (disambiguation)
