= St. Jude's Church =

St. Jude's Church or St. Jude Church may refer to:

== Australia ==
- St Jude's Church, Brighton, South Australia
- St Jude's Church, Carlton, Melbourne
- St Jude's Church, Randwick, Sydney

== Canada ==
- Church of St. Jude (Wexford), Scarborough, Toronto

== India ==
- St. Jude Church, Kidangoor, Kerala
- St. Jude Church, Karanakodam

== Pakistan ==
- St. Jude's Church, Karachi, Pakistan

== United Kingdom ==
=== England ===
- St Jude's Church, Bristol
- St Jude's Church, Hampstead Garden Suburb, London
- St Jude's Church, Kensington, London
- St Jude's Church, Mapperley, Nottinghamshire
- St Jude's Church, Plymouth, Devon
- St Jude's Church, Tilstone Fearnall, Cheshire
- St Jude's Church, Birmingham
- St Jude's Church, Wigan

=== Scotland ===
- St. Jude's Church, Glasgow

=== Wales ===
- St Jude's Church, Swansea

== United States ==
- The church at the City of St. Jude in Montgomery, Alabama
- St. Jude's Episcopal Church, Monroe City, Missouri
- St. Jude Church (New York City)
- St. Jude Syro-Malankara Catholic Church, in Bensalem, Pennsylvania, US

== See also ==
- St. Jude's Cathedral (disambiguation)
- St. Jude Catholic Church (disambiguation)
