= Juventus (disambiguation) =

Juventus is the name of several football clubs in Europe, Latin America, Africa and Australia:

== Football ==
- Juventus FC, association football club based in Turin, Italy. It can also refer to:
  - Juventus FC (women), women's association football team of Juventus FC
  - Juventus Next Gen, men's reserve team of Juventus FC
  - Juventus FC Youth Sector, youth system of Juventus FC
- Alma Juventus Fano 1906, an Italian football club from Fano, Marche
- A.S.D. Fortis Juventus 1909, an Italian football club from Borgo San Lorenzo, Tuscany
- Juventus Audax Roma, an Italian defunct football club from Rome
- Juventus Foot-Ball Club, an Italian defunct football club from Florenfe
- Juventus Italia F.C., an Italian defunct football club from Milan
- Juventus F.C. (Belize), a Belizean football club from Orange Walk Town
- Juventus F.C. (Nicaragua), a Nicaraguan football club from Managua
- SV Juventus, a Bonaire football club from Kralendijk
- Clube Atlético Juventus, a Brazilian football club from São Paulo
- Atlético Clube Juventus, a Brazilian football club from Rio Branco, Acre state
- Grêmio Esportivo Juventus, a Brazilian football club from Jaraguá do Sul, Santa Catarina state
- Clube Atlético Juventus (SC), a Brazilian football club from Seara, Santa Catarina state
- Juventus Atlético Clube, a Brazilian football club from Santa Rosa, Rio Grande do Sul state
- Juventus Esporte Clube, a Brazilian football club from Macapá, Amapá state
- Juventus Esporte Clube (Guariba), a Brazilian football club from Guariba, São Paulo state
- Juventus Futebol Clube, a Brazilian football club from Rio de Janeiro
- Sociedade Educação Física Juventus, a Brazilian defunct football club from Curitiba
- Associação Atlética Juventus Minasnovense, a Brazilian football club from Minas Novas, Minas Gerais state
- Club Deportivo Juventus, a Chilean football club from Caldera, Atacama Region
- Juventus (Costa Rica), a Costa Rican football club
- Club Social y Deportivo Juventus, an Ecuadorian football club from Esmeraldas, Ecuador
- FC Juventus Löhne 2005, a German football club from Löhne, North Rhine-Westphalia
- ASG Juventus de Sainte-Anne, a Guadeloupean football club from Sainte-Anne
- FC Juventus des Cayes, a Haitian football club from Les Cayes
- Juventus de Yopougon, an Ivorian football club from Yopougon, Lagunes
- Juventus Corazón, a Peruvian football club from Arequipa
- CFT Juventus Focșani, a Romanian football club from Focșani, Vrancea County
- CS Juventus Bascov, a Romanian football club from Bascov, Argeș County
- CS Juventus Fălticeni, a Romanian football club from Fălticeni, Suceava County
- FC Juventus Bistrița, a Romanian football club from Bistrița, Bistriţa-Năsăud County
- CS Juventus București, a Romanian football club from Bucharest founded in 1992
- Juventus de Saint-Martin, a Saint-Martin football club
- Sasolburg Juventus FC, a South African football club from Tshwane
- Juventus Idrottsförening, a Swedish football club from Västerås
- FC Juventus Cresciano, a Swiss football club from Cresciano, Ticino
- FC Juventus Dulliken, a Swiss football club from Dulliken, Solothurn
- FC Juventus St. Gallen, a Swiss football club from St. Gallen
- SC Young Fellows Juventus, a Swiss football club from Zürich

=== Previously known as Juventus ===
- A.S. Livorno Calcio, an Italian football club from Livorno, Tuscany, founded by merger between SPES Livorn and Virtus Juventusque
- FBC Luino 1910, an Italian football club from Luino, Lombardy, previously known as Juventus FC
- S.S.D. Massese, an Italian football club from Massa, Tuscany, previously known as US Massese Juventus 1919
- A.S. Trapani, an Italian football club from Trapani, Sicily, previously known as Juventus Trapani
- Adelaide City F.C. 1946, an Australian football club previously known as Adelaide Juventus
- Brunswick Juventus (now known as Brunswick Zebras S.C.), an Australian football (soccer) club from Brunswick (Melbourne)
- Gungahlin United FC, an Australian football (soccer) club from Canberra, founded as Juventus S.C. and then Gungahlin Juventus S.C.
- Hobart Zebras FC, an Australian football (soccer) club from Hobart, Tasmania, previously known as Juventus S.C. Hobart
- Launceston City FC, an Australian football (soccer) club from Launceston, Tasmania, previously known as Launceston Juventus S.C.
- FK Juventus Malchika, a Bulgarian defunct football club from Malchika, Levski Municipality, merged with FK Levski to OFC Levski 2007
- FC Petrolul Ploiești, a Romanian football club from Ploiești, Prahova County, founded as FC Juventus București in 1924
- MFK Topvar Topoľčany, a Slovak football club from Topoľčany, Nitra Region, previously known as ASC Juventus Topoľčany
- AC Bellinzona, a Swiss football club from Bellinzona, Ticino, previously known as FC Juventus Bellinzona
- FC Juventus Locarno, a Swiss defunct football club from Locarno, Ticino, merged with FC Unitas Locarno to form FC Locarno
- Deportivo Táchira FC, a Venezuelan football club from San Cristóbal, Táchira, founded as Juventus de San Cristobal

== Other ==
- Juventas (or Juventus), goddess of youth
- Juventud Guerrera, a Mexican professional wrestler
- Juventus (basketball club), a basketball club from Utena, Lithuania, playing in the LKL
- Juventus (choir), a mixed choir in the University of Latvia
- Juventus, a youth movement in the mythical country of Evallonia in John Buchan's novel, The House of the Four Winds

== See also ==
- Juve (disambiguation)
- Juventud (disambiguation)
- Juventude (disambiguation)
- J'ouvert, the Caribbean festival
