= Judas the Apostle =

Judas the Apostle my refer to:

- Judas Iscariot, the apostle who betrayed Jesus
- Jude the Apostle, also known as Thaddaeus and Judas "not Iscariot"
- Thomas the Apostle, known in some sources as Judas Thomas

== See also ==
- Judas (disambiguation)
