= JUV =

JUV may refer to:

- Juvenile (disambiguation)
- Juventus FC
- Upernavik Airport, in Greenland
