= Rakesh Jhunjhunwala =

Indian businessman (1960–2022)

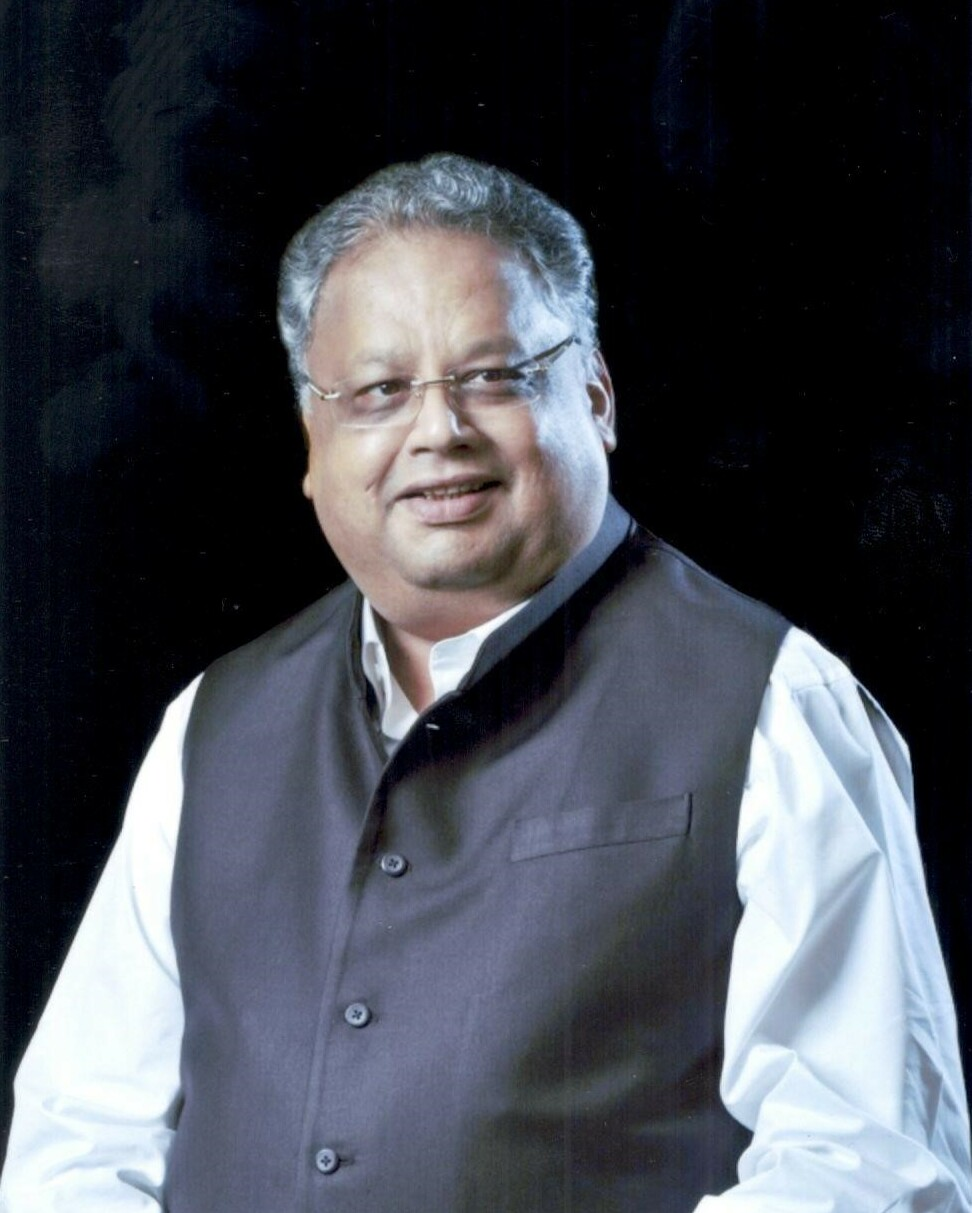
- Born: 5 July 1960; Hyderabad, Telangana India
- Died: 14 August 2022 (aged 62); Mumbai, Maharashtra, India
- Education: Chartered Accountant
- Alma mater: Sydenham College of Commerce and Economics; The Institute of Chartered Accountants of India
- Occupations: Investor; Stock trader
- Spouse: Rekha Jhunjhunwala (m. 1987)
- Children: 3
- Awards: Padma Shri (2023)

Rakesh Radheyshyam Jhunjhunwala (5 July 1960 – 14 August 2022) was an Indian billionaire investor, stock trader, and Chartered Accountant. He began investing in 1985 with a capital of ₹5,000, with his first major profit in 1986. At the time of his death, he had an estimated net worth of US$5.8 billion, making him the 438th richest person in the world. He was a partner in his own asset management firm, Rare Enterprises.

Besides being an active investor and stock trader, he served as chairperson and director for several companies. He was also a co-founder of Akasa Air. He was investigated for insider trading and settled with the Securities and Exchange Board of India (SEBI) in 2021. Jhunjhunwala was often referred to as the "Big Bull of India" and was widely known for his stock market predictions and bullish outlooks. In 2023, he was posthumously awarded the Padma Shri, India's fourth-highest civilian award.

In October 2024, his wife, Rekha Jhunjhunwala, was ranked 28th on the Forbes list of India’s 100 richest tycoons, with a net worth of $9.3 billion.

== Early life and education ==
Jhunjhunwala was born on 5 July 1960 in a Marwari Agarwal Bania family His surname indicates that his ancestors belonged to Jhunjhunu in Rajasthan. He graduated from Sydenham College and thereafter enrolled at the Institute of Chartered Accountants of India.

== Career ==
Jhunjhunwala's interest in stock markets arose when he observed his father discussing the markets with his friends. While his father guided him on the markets, he never gave him money to invest and forbade him from asking friends for money. With his savings at hand, Rakesh invested early while in college. Beginning with ₹5,000 capital in 1985, Jhunjhunwala's first big profit came in the form of ₹5 lakh in 1986. Between 1986 and 1989, he earned almost ₹20–25 lakh profit. By 2022, his investment had grown to ₹11,000 crores. As of 2021, his biggest investment was in Titan Company which was worth ₹7,294.8 crore.

He managed his own portfolio as a partner in his asset management firm, Rare Enterprises. Besides being an active investor, Jhunjhunwala was the chairman of Aptech and Hungama Digital Media Entertainment and sat on the board of directors of Prime Focus Limited, Geojit Financial Services, Bilcare Limited, Praj Industries, Provogue, Concord Biotech, Innovasynth Technologies (I) Limited, Mid Day Multimedia Limited, Nagarjuna Construction Company, Viceroy Hotels, and Tops Security Limited. He was also a member of the Board of Advisors of India's International Movement to Unite Nations (I.I.M.U.N.).

In 2013, Jhunjhunwala bought 6 of the 12 units of Ridgeway apartments at Malabar Hill from Standard Chartered Bank for ₹ 176 crore. Later in 2017, he bought the other 6 apartments in the building from HSBC for ₹ 195 crore. In 2021, he commenced the construction of his new 70,000 square feet 13-storey home after the demolition of the old building.

In July 2021, he invested in Akasa Air, a low-cost airline in India, investing US$400 million for a 40% stake in the airline. As of February 2024, the new airline has 24 aircraft and flies to 19 cities. Rakesh had increased his stake in the airline to 46% becoming the largest stakeholder in the company before his death. His final appearance was at the inaugural event of Akasa Air, and he later flew on the airline's first flight between Mumbai and Ahmedabad on 7 August.

Jhunjhunwala was known for his ability to identify potential growth sectors early. Beyond his investments in established companies, he had a keen interest in India's consumer-driven sectors such as retail and technology. He believed that the expanding middle class would significantly boost domestic consumption, which guided many of his early investment decisions.

== Accusation of insider trading ==
In 2021, Jhunjhunwala was investigated for insider trading, for unusual dealing in shares of Aptech Computers. SEBI had alleged that Jhunjhunwala and others traded in Aptech when in possession of unpublished price sensitive information (UPSI). In September 2016, Aptech had announced its foray into the preschool segment. As per the SEBI order, this was an UPSI between 14 March 2016 and 7 September 2016, the date of the official announcement. In July 2021, the SEBI had settled the issue after a total payment of ₹35 crore from Jhunjhunwala and his associates. Jhunjhunwala paid ₹18.5 crore and his wife paid ₹3.2 crores.

== Philanthropy ==
Jhunjhunwala, whose net worth stood at US$5.8 billion as at the time of his death, had plans to donate a quarter of his wealth to charity. His philanthropic portfolio included health care as well as education-related initiatives, supporting organizations such St Jude, Agastya International Foundation, Ashoka University, Friends of Tribals Society and Olympic Gold Quest. He was also active in efforts to construct R J Sankara eye hospital in New Panvel.

== In popular culture ==
On 7 June 2012, the authors of a blog parodying him were revealed by The Economic Times to be two people: For the first year, Mark Fidelman (a Forbes columnist) and for the remaining years, writer Aditya Magal.

In the web series Scam 1992, actor Kavin Dave played a role based on Jhunjhunwala.

== Death ==
On 14 August 2022, Jhunjhunwala fell ill and was rushed to Breach Candy Hospital in Mumbai, and died at approximately 6:30 a.m. Doctors later reported that he suffered from kidney-related problems and acute multiple organ failure. Indian Prime Minister Narendra Modi shared his condolences stating, "Rakesh Jhunjhunwala was indomitable. Full of life, witty and insightful, he leaves behind an indelible contribution to the financial world. He was also very passionate about India's progress. His passing away is saddening for the financial world." After Jhunjhunwala's death, he was posthumously awarded the Padma Shri, India's fourth-highest civilian award, in 2023.

== Personal life ==
Rakesh Jhunjhunwala married Rekha Jhunjhunwala on 22 February 1987. The couple had three children. Their daughter Nishtha was born on 30 June 2004, Their twin sons Aryaman and Aryaveer were born on 2 March 2009.
