= Juvenal (name) =

Juvenal is a masculine given name and a surname which may refer to:

== People ==
- Juvenal, Decimus Iunius Iuvenalis, 2nd century Roman poet
- Saint Juvenal (disambiguation)
- Juvenal (Poyarkov) (born 1935), Metropolitan of Krutitsy and Kolomna, archbishop of the Russian Orthodox Church
- Juvenal Agnero (born 1998), Ivorian footballer
- Juvenal Amarijo (1923–2009), Brazilian football defender
- Juvenal de Araújo (1892–1976), Portuguese Madeiran politician
- Juvenal Briceño (born 1965), Peruvian football manager and former player
- Juvenal Francisco Dias (1923–2012), Brazilian football defender
- Juvenal Edjogo-Owono (born 1979), Spanish football manager and former player
- Juvenal Gomes da Silva (born 1979), Brazilian football defender
- Juvénal Habyarimana (1937–1994), Rwandan Hutu politician and major general, 2nd president of Rwanda
- Juvenal Hernández (1899–1979), Chilean lawyer, academic, diplomat and politician
- Juvenal Juvêncio (1934–2015), Brazilian lawyer, politician and former president of São Paulo FC
- Juvenal Marizamunda (born 1965), Rwandan brigadier general and politician, Minister of Defense
- Juvenal Olmos (born 1962), Chilean football coach and former football midfielder
- Juvenal Ordoñez (1948–2009), Peruvian politician
- Juvénal Rugambarara, mayor of Bicumi, Rwanda, sentenced to 11 years imprisonment for his part in the Rwandan genocide
- Juvénal Uwilingiyimana (1951–2005), Rwandan politician and Commerce Minister
- James Juvenal (1874–1942), American rower
- Thomas Juvenal (died 1309), first known Common Serjeant of London (an ancient British legal office)

== Fictional characters ==
- Dr. Juvenal Urbino, in the novel Love in the Time of Cholera and the film adaptation
