= Amit Varma =

Amit Varma may refer to:

- Amit Varma (writer), Indian writer
- Amit Varma (actor) (born 1986), Indian television actor
- Amit Varma (doctor) (born 1968), critical care physician and businessman
- Amit Verma, Indian cricketer
