= Juive =

Juive is the French word for Jewess and the feminine form for Jewish.

Juive may refer to:

- Jews
- La Juive, 1835 grand opera by Fromental Halévy

== See also ==
- La belle juive, an artistic motif
- Château de la Juive (Juive Castle), Besançon, Franche-Comté, France
- Juvy
- Juvee
- Juvie (disambiguation)
- Juve (disambiguation)
- Juif, the masculine form of the same French noun and adjective
- Jew (disambiguation)
