= Judas (disambiguation) =

Judas Iscariot was the apostle of Jesus who betrayed him.

Judas is also the Greek form of the Hebrew name Judah, and may refer to:

== People ==
- Jude (given name)
- Judah (son of Jacob), a patriarch
- Judas the Zealot, mentioned in the Epistle of the Apostles (Epistula Apostolorum), written in the 2nd century
- Judas of Galilee, also Judas of Gamala, Jewish revolt leader
- Judas, alternate name of Jude, one of the "brothers" of Jesus
- Judas, in whose house on the Street called Straight in Damascus Saul of Tarsus regained his sight
- Judas (theologian), early 3rd century Christian
- Judas Thomas Didymus or Saint Thomas
- Judas Thaddaeus, son of James, one of the twelve apostles
- Judas Cyriacus (died 360), man said to have assisted Helena of Constantinople to find the True Cross
- Judas Maccabeus, founder of the Hasmonean dynasty
- Judas Barsabbas, companion of the apostles Paul, Barnabas and Silas, emissary of the Church of Jerusalem to the Church at Antioch
- Judas Ullulaq, Canadian Inuk artist

== Literature ==
- Gospel of Judas, an ancient Gnostic Gospel
- "Judas" (short story), a 1967 short story by John Brunner
- Judas (manga), a 2004 manga by Suu Minazuki
- Judas (novel), 2014 novel by Amos Oz
- Judas (play), 1929 play by Walter Ferris and Basil Rathbone
- Judas (comics), a 2018 comic book series written by Jeff Loveness

== Film ==
- Júdás, a 1918 Hungarian film
- Judas (1930 film), a Soviet silent drama film
- Judas (1936 film), a Mexican drama film
- Judas (2001 film), an Italian-German television film with Enrico Lo Verso as Judas
- Judas (2004 film), an American film with Johnathon Schaech as Judas Iscariot
- Judas (2013 film), a Russian film with Aleksey Shevchenkov as Judas Iscariot

== Music ==
=== Albums ===
- Judas (Fozzy album), 2017, or the title song
- Judas (Quelentaro album), 1970
- Judas, a 2011 album and the title song by Wisdom

=== Songs ===
- "Judas" (ballad), a traditional English ballad
- "Judas" (Lady Gaga song), 2011
- "Judas" (Josiah Queen song), 2026
- "Judas", a 1953 song by Lucienne Delyle
- "Judas", a 1986 song by Helloween
- "Judas", a 1993 song by Depeche Mode from Songs of Faith and Devotion
- "Judas", a 2007 song by Kelly Clarkson from My December
- "Judas", a 2017 song by Fozzy from the album of the same name
- "Judas", a 2008 song by The Verve from Forth
- "Judas", a song by Cage the Elephant from their eponymous 2008 album
- "Judas", a 2016 song by Banks from The Altar
- "Judas", a 2020 song by JID from Spilligion
- "Judas", a 2021 song by Bad Gyal from Warm Up

=== Other Music ===
- Judas Maccabaeus (Handel), an oratorio in three acts composed in 1746 by George Frideric Handel

== Other uses ==
- Judas (video_game), an upcoming video game
- Judas goat, a trained goat used in animal herding
- Judas animals, used to locate wild or feral members of their own species
- Judas incident, an famous incident of heckling at a Bob Dylan concert

== See also ==
- Betrayal
- Judas goat (disambiguation)
- Judas kiss (disambiguation)
- Judas Tree (disambiguation)
- Jude (disambiguation)
- Kingdom of Judah
