= Joo =

Joo may refer to:

- Joo (singer), South Korean singer
- Ju (Korean surname), also romanized as Joo
- Ju (Korean given name), also romanized as Joo
- Khazars

== See also ==
- Jew (disambiguation)
- Jōō (disambiguation)
- Joos (given name)
- Joos (surname)
