= SJCS =

SJCS could refer to one of several things:

- Saint Jude Catholic School (disambiguation)
- Seattle Jewish Community School (SJCS)
- St John's College School
- St. Joseph's College School
