= Cilver =

American rock band

- Origin: New York City
- Genre: Rock Music
- Years active: 2013–present
- Label: Entertainment One Music
- Members: Uliana Preotu – (Vocals); Leon Lyazidi – (Guitar); Ramsey Modiri – (guitars); Josh Pillbox – (Bass); Michael Ostuni – (Drums)
- Website: cilverband.com

Cilver is a rock band from New York City. Originally formed as MeTalkPretty in 2006, the group changed their name in 2013. The band, fronted by Romanian immigrant Uliana Preotu, has enjoyed one hit single, I'm America, which charted in 2016.

== Origins as MeTalkPretty ==
Frontwoman Uliana Preotu recounts standing in bread-lines as a child during the waning days of Communist Romania. She had fronted the Romanian rock band AcvilA in 2001, playing shows in her hometown of Iași. She emigrated from Romania while still in her teens alongside her mother in 2005, arriving in the United States without any fluency in English. Preotu started work at McDonald's before ever getting into music. Worried that Lyazidi and Kluz (who specifically advertised for a male singer) would reject her due to her gender, Preotu signed her emails to them leading to her audition as "J" (short for Julia, the anglicized version of Uliana she went by) rather than risk dismissal prior to getting her chance to sing for them by revealing her feminine name. Preotu lists Gwen Stefani and System of a Down as inspirations.

MeTalkPretty formed in 2006 by Uliana Preotu (lead vocals), Leon Lyazidi (guitar/keyboards) and James Kluz (drums). Nate Meng (bass) joined in 2008. Guerin Blask (drums) joined in 2010, and Kevin Coffrin (bass) joined in 2011. In 2008, the band gained their first invite to the Vans Warped Tour thanks to winning Sabian's "dream spot" competition, defeating bands such as Stereo Skyline and The Crash Moderns. MeTalkPretty subsequently joined the tour in Saskatoon. The group would perform on the Warped Tour again in 2009 as well as play at both South by Southwest and the CMJ music conference. On Sept 11, 2009, the band won the MTV Video Music Award for Best Breakout Band NYC. Shortly thereafter, on October 4, 2009 they began to record their debut record with Noah Shain. "Wake Up, Wake Up", a re-recording of the song "Wake Up!", was featured in the soundtrack for NHL 10. On February 1, 2010, the band announced via their Facebook page that they signed to Eight O Five Records/Fontana Distribution/Universal Music Group, and have finished their debut record entitled We Are Strangers.

Preotu has been credited with exuding sexiness to help market her band but her "operatic vocals... brings more than mere sex appeal with her soaring voice that often strikes a balance between threatening and erotic." The New York Daily News said her "goth-operatic voice recalls Evanescence’s Amy Lee." Leon Lyazidi, also a first-generation immigrant to the United States, said that starting piano at an early age sent him on a musical path despite studying medicine at NYU. As both a songwriter and a guitarist, Lyazidi is credited with bringing "a darkness and texture to the music that makes it so much more than radio-ready-rock."

The band's name may have been inspired by David Sedaris's 2000 book Me Talk Pretty One Day. Described in 2008 as "pop rockers," MeTalkPretty counted TV news anchor Katie Couric as a fan.

== Reformation as Cilver ==
In what Blabbermouth.net calls an "artistic restart," Preotu and Lyazidi re-formed the band in their current incarnation with the help of fellow-NYC musician Ron "Bumblefoot" Thal on their debut single, "In My Head". Preotu and Lyazidi both met Thal while still in MeTalkPretty and he expressed interest in working with them. Preotu and Lyazidi knew Modiri, Ostuni, and Pillbox from other bands and reached out to them as replacements for outgoing members Blask and Coffrin. They subsequently signed with Entertainment One Music.

Cilver's most successful song to date has been "I'm America", the lone-single off their album Not the End of the World. The song enjoyed seven weeks on Billboard's mainstream rock chart, peaking in 2016 at 36. Lead singer Uliana Preotu described the song as a theme for unification, based largely upon her experience as a Romanian-emigrant to the United States. The Milwaukee Journal Sentinel described her as "a genuinely tuneful and steady lead singer." The band has been compared to contemporary woman-fronted rock bands such as Halestorm, Lacuna Coil, and The Pretty Reckless although Preotu's vocals put her in a league with Pat Benatar, Stevie Nicks, Beth Hart, and Ann Wilson. SLUG Magazine described the group's sound as "Joan Jett meets Bush." In 2014, Cilver performed in Salt Lake City for Revolver Magazine's "Hottest Chicks in Hard Rock" tour. In addition to the tour, Preotu was featured in the magazine's "Hottest Chicks In Hard Rock" issue and accompanying calendar. In her Revolver interview, she described turning to Buddhism after losing her father at an early age only to return to Christianity. She claims that as a young girl in Romania, a gypsy woman foretold her life would be filled with travel impossible during the communist era especially for a poverty-stricken youth. Preotu also claims to have learned how to read palms and performed the feat before. During 2016, Cilver opened for Sixx:A.M.

=== Singles ===
Year	Single	Chart	Position
2016	"I'm America"	US Billboard Mainstream Rock	36

== Activatr ==
Separately, Preotu and Lyazidi formed a marketing company called Activatr specializing in merchandise sales for musical acts.
