= Randol Township, Cape Girardeau County, Missouri =

Township in the US state of Missouri

Randol Township
- Township
- Coordinates: 37°23′17″N 089°32′45″W
- Country: United States
- State: Missouri
- County: Cape Girardeau

Area
  - Total: 66.92 sq mi (173.31 km^{2})
  - Land: 65.29 sq mi (169.11 km^{2})
  - Water: 1.6 sq mi (4.2 km^{2}) 2.42%
- Elevation: 650 ft (198 m)

Population (2000)
  - Total: 4,030
  - Density: 62/sq mi (23.8/km^{2})
- FIPS code: 29-60572
- GNIS feature ID: 0766401

Randol Township is one of ten townships in Cape Girardeau County, Missouri, USA. As of the 2000 census, its population was 4,030.

== History ==
Randol Township was founded in 1872. The township derives its name from Enos Randal, a pioneer citizen.

Randol Township is located on the west bank of the Mississippi River, which forms the border with Illinois. The mouth of the Ohio River at Cairo, at the intersection of the states of Missouri, Illinois, and Kentucky, is about 70 km to the southeast.

== Geography ==
Randol Township covers an area of 66.92 square miles (173.3 km^{2}) and contains no incorporated settlements. It contains two unincorporated settlements: Oriole, and Egypt Mills. Known cemeteries include Bowman, Brinkman, Brooks/Hobbs, Brown, Davis 2, Ervin, Foster, Fuerth, Hebron Baptist Church, Hemstead, Heuer, Iona, Keyser/Poe, Kirschoff, Koeppel/Lueders, Koker, Lange, Minton, Minton/Egypt Mills, Noland, Norvell, Schwettman, Scriptural Evangelical Lutheran, Sheppard, Smith/Davis, Thompson, Trinity Lutheran, Vangilder, Zierath.

The streams of Juden Creek, Bainbridge Creek, Little Flora Creek and Soakie Creek run through this township.
