= Yudo =

Yudo may refer to:

== People ==
- Kushedya Hari Yudo (born 1993), Indonesian professional football player
- Siswono Yudo Husodo (born 1943), Indonesian politician and businessman
- Yudo Margono (born 1965), Indonesian Navy admiral

== Other uses ==
- Yudo Auto, a Chinese electric vehicle marque by Fujian Motors Group
- Yudo, Tibet, China
- "Yudo", the Korean pronunciation of Judo
- Yudo: The Way of the Bath, a Japanese film

== See also ==
- Yuda (disambiguation)
