= Yuda =

Yuda may refer to:

== Fictional characters ==
- Yuda, a character from Fist of the North Star
- Yuda (comics), a Kryptonian deity from DC Comics

== People ==
- Yuda, abbreviation of the given name Yehuda; includes a list of people with the name
- Yuda Mappila, term for the Cochin Jews of Kerala, India

=== People with the surname ===
- Ahmad Zigi Zaresta Yuda (born 1998), Indonesian karateka
- Hazuki Yuda (湯田 葉月; born 1989), Japanese field hockey player
- John Yuda Msuri (born 1979), Tanzanian long-distance runner
- Tian Yuda (田玉达; born 2001), Chinese professional footballer
- Yuriy Yuda (born 1983), Kazakh former cyclist

== Places ==
- Yuda (mine), short name of a former copper mine called Yudnamutana, South Australia
- Yuda, Iwate, a town in Japan

== See also ==
- "Dong Work for Yuda", a song by Frank Zappa from the rock opera Joe's Garage
- Juda (disambiguation)
- Judah (disambiguation)
- Uda (disambiguation)
- Yahud (disambiguation)
- Yehud (disambiguation)
- Yehudi (disambiguation)
- Yoda (disambiguation), a character from the Star Wars universe
