= Juda =

Juda may refer to:

== People ==
- Adele Juda (1888–1949), Austrian psychologist and neurologist
- Annely Juda (1914–2006), German art dealer
- Elsbeth Juda (1911–2014), British photographer, wife of Hans
- Hans Juda (1904–1975), British publisher, businessman, writer and designer
- Paul Juda (born 2001), American artistic gymnast

== Other uses ==
- Juda, Wisconsin, an unincorporated community in the U.S.
- Juda, a chieftain of Bikini Atoll before Operation Crossroads
- "Juda", a 2003 song by Mizar (band)
- "Juda", a song by Rebecca F. from the 1999 EP It's All About You

== See also ==
- Judah (disambiguation)
- Yuda (disambiguation)
- Yehudi (disambiguation)
- Ouidah, or Whydah, a port city in Benin
