= Jōō =

Jōō may refer to:

- Jōō (Kamakura period), a Japanese era name (1222–1224)
- Jōō (Edo period), a Japanese era name (1652–1655)
- Takeno Jōō (1502–1555), Japanese tea master
- Jōō (manga)

== See also ==
- Joo (disambiguation)
