= Aditya Magal =

Indian writer, author and blogger

Aditya Magal (born 1985) is a writer, author and blogger from India who runs the satire portal Secret Journal of Rakesh Jhunjhunwala. He has also been a columnist for HT Brunch magazine, the Sunday supplement of the Hindustan Times. and has written for Hindustan Times, The Economic Times, Outlook Magazine and JAM among others. His first novel titled 'How to become a billionaire by selling Nothing' was released by Penguin Random House . He is currently the feature columnist for Bangalore Mirror. His column Notes from the 560 has gained popularity for its op-ed pieces.

== Career ==
Magal has gained popularity primarily as a humorist and satirist though he has written non-humorous material also which have been less popular. He ran the satire blog The Secret Journal of Rakesh Jhunjhunwala based on Legendary Indian Investor Rakesh Jhunjhunwala. Most of his posts and tweets are funny outtakes on Indian life, politics and business. His sharp and incisive humour has attracted both laughter and criticism.

In 2009, a still anonymous Magal gave his first interview to Blogadda.com after nearly two years of blogging anonymously.

In 2010, Forbes Magazine did a feature on him in their March issue which asked who Magal was. He was also featured on MoneyControl

He has been featured in publications such as Mint, Outlook Magazine, Mid-day, JAM Magazine, Hindustan Times, Open Magazine, Pune Mirror, DNA and Business Standard.

In 2012, after nearly four years of blogging anonymously his identity was revealed in a front page feature in the 7 June edition of The Economic Times where he was reported to have had a wonderful meeting with the real Rakesh Jhunjhunwala.

In 2013, he was once again featured in the edition of 23 October of the Hindustan Times Business section.

In April 2014, Magal announced that his first book titled 'How to become a billionaire by selling Nothing', a fiction novel would be released in May that year. The book was published by Penguin Random House India and was well received for its humour and satire content. The book has been charted on the Amazon Bestsellers list but has also received adverse criticism for views on consumerism.

As of 2016 he has started writing for the Times Group's Bangalore Mirror.
