= Yehud =

Yehud may refer to:

- Yehud (Babylonian province), a territory in the 6th century BC
- Yehud (Persian province), a territory in the 6th–4th centuries BC
- Yehud, Israel, a modern city

== See also ==
- Yahud (disambiguation)
- Yehudi (disambiguation)
- Yehuda (disambiguation)
- Judah (disambiguation)
