= Juvenal (disambiguation) =

Juvenal was an ancient Roman poet.

Juvenal or Juvenals may also refer to:

- Juvenal (name), a list of people and fictional characters with the given name or surname
- SS Juvenal, an oil tanker built in 1928
- Juvenals, a student society
