= Juventud =

Juventud, a Spanish word meaning youth, or Juventude, its Portuguese equivalent, may refer to:

== Places ==
- Isla de la Juventud, Cuba

== People ==
- Juventud Guerrera, ring name of Mexican professional wrestler Eduardo Aníbal González Hernández also known as "Juvi"

== Arts and entertainment ==
=== Juventud ===
- Arriba Juventud, Argentine musical
- Canción de Juventud (Song of Youth), Spanish 1962 musical directed by Luis Lucia
- DKDA: Sueños de juventud, (English: DKDA: Youth dreams), Mexican juvenile telenovela
- El Grito de la juventud, Argentine film directed by Brazilian director Raul Roulien
- Fiebre de juventud (English: "Youth Fever"), also known as Romance en Ecuador (English: "Romance in Ecuador"), 1966 Mexican-Ecuadorian musical comedy
- Idolos de Juventud, Spanish soap opera telenovela produced by the United States-based television network Telemundo
- Juventud (TV series), soap opera and Mexican telenovela produced for Televisa in 1980
- Juventud En Extasis, a 2007 album by Maria Daniela y su Sonido Lasser
- Loca juventud, 1965 Spanish and Italian film directed by Manuel Mur Oti
- Mágica juventud (English title: Magic youth), Mexican telenovela
- Premios Juventud or Youth Awards, is an awards show for Spanish-speaking celebrities in the areas of film, music, sports, fashion, and pop culture, presented by the television network Univision
- Juventud, a Canadian indie rock band from Ottawa

=== Juventude ===
- Juventude de Atitude (Attitude Of Youth), the second album of Brazilian hip hop group Facção Central

== Media and publications ==
- El Nuevo Tesoro de la Juventud, Spanish encyclopaedia
- Juventud Comunista (newspaper), or Communist Youth, was a weekly newspaper published from Barcelona, Spain 1936-1937
- Juventud Rebelde, Cuban newspaper

== Politics ==
=== Juventud ===
- Juventud Aprista Peruana, Peruvian youth organisation
- Juventud Uruguaya de Pie, a former Uruguayan far-right youth organisation

=== Juventude ===
- Aliança Socialista da Juventude (ASJ) or Socialist Youth Alliance, earlier Portuguese leftist youth movement linked to the Workers Revolutionary Party (PRT)
- Grupo Tacuara de la Juventud Nacionalista or Tacuara Nationalist Movement, established 1955 and through the 1960s, Argentine Neo Nazi movement later integrated Juan Perón's right-wing "Special Formations"
- Juventud Aprista Peruana, youth organization of Partido Aprista Peruano in Peru
- Juventude CDU, the youth wing of the Unitarian Democratic Coalition (CDU) in Portugal consisting of the Portuguese Communist Youth (JCP) and Ecolojovem
- Juventude Comunista Portuguesa (JCP) or Portuguese Communist Youth, youth organization of the Portuguese Communist Party
- Juventud Comunista Revolucionaria youth wing of the Revolutionary Communist Party of Argentina
- Juventudes de Izquierda Comunista or Communist Left Youth, an earlier Spanish youth organization
- Juventude do MPLA (JMPLA) or Youth of MPLA, a major mass organization within the People's Movement for the Liberation of Angola
- Juventud Parroquial Chilena (JUPACH), Chilean Catholic youth organization
- Juventude Popular or People's Youth (Portugal), Portuguese political youth organisation
- Juventude Social Democrata, the youth wing of the Portuguese Social Democratic Party, liberal-conservative political party in Portugal
- Juventud Uruguaya de Pie or The Uruguayan Youth Standing, was a Uruguayan far-right student organization during the 1970s
- Nova Juventude de Macau or New Youth of Macau, a political party in the Chinese Special Administrative Region of Macau

=== Juventudes ===
- Juventudes de Acción Popular (JAP), the youth wing of CEDA, a Spanish Catholic right-wing party in the 1930s
- Juventudes Comunistas de Chile (JJ.CC. / La Jota) or Communist Youth of Chile, youth wing of the Communist Party of Chile
- Unión de Juventudes Maoístas (UJM) or Maoist Youth Union, was a youth organization in Spain during the transition to democracy

== Sports ==
=== Football clubs ===
==== Juventud ====
- Atlético Juventud Girardot, El Salvador
- Club Atlético Juventud, Argentina
- Club Atlético Juventud Unida Universitario, Argentina
- Club Joventut Badalona, Spain
- C.D. Juventud Candelareño, El Salvador
- C.D. Juventud Independiente, El Salvador
- C.D. Juventud Olímpica Metalio, El Salvador
- FC Isla de La Juventud, Cuba
- Juventud Alianza de San Juan, Argentina
- Juventud Antoniana, Argentina
- Juventud Cambados, Spain
- Juventud La Joya, Peru
- Juventud de Pergamino, officially Club Atlético Juventud, Argentina
- Juventud de Las Piedras, Uruguay
- Juventud Ticlacayán, Peru
- Juventud de Torremolinos CF, Spain
- Juventud Retalteca (now defunct), Guatemala
- Juventud La Rural, Peru
- Juventud Unida de Gualeguaychú, Argentina
- Juventud Unida de San Miguel, Argentina
- Juventud Unida Universitario, Argentine
- C.D. Real Juventud, Honduras
- Real Juventud San Joaquín, Chile
- SV Juventud Tanki Leendert, Aruba
- Unión Juventud, Peru

==== Juventude ====
- Esporte Clube Juventude, Brazilian football team; Juventude most commonly refers to this team in football terms
- Juventude Sport Clube, also commonly known as Juventude de Évora, amateur sports club based in Évora, Portugal
- Juventude (Fogo), Cape Verdean football team
- Juventude (Sal), Cape Verdean football team
- Juventude Atlético do Moxico, Angolan football team
- Juventude Atlética de Rio Meão, Portuguese football club in the parish of Rio Meão, municipality of Santa Maria da Feira, the district of Aveiro
- Sociedade Esportiva e Recreativa Juventude, smaller Brazilian football team from Mato Grosso state
- Sociedade Esportiva Juventude, smaller Brazilian football tean from São Mateus do Maranhão, Maranhão state

=== Other sport clubs ===
- Associação Juventude de Viana, Portuguese rink hockey club from Viana do Castelo, Portugal
- G.D. Juventude de Viana (roller hockey), formerly Enama de Viana, Angolan sports club based in the municipality of Viana, Luanda
- Isla de la Juventud (baseball), Cuban baseball team
- Juventud Alianza, Argentine sports club based in the city of Santa Lucía, San Juan
- Juventud de Las Piedras or Club Atlético Juventud, sports club from Las Piedras, Canelones, Uruguay
- Juventud Sionista, Argentine basketball club

== Other ==
- Instituto de la Juventud, or Institute of Youth, an agency of the Government of Spain responsible for promoting youth associations
- Isla De La Juventud tree hutia, or southern hutia (Mysateles meridionalis), species of rodent in the family Capromyidae

== See also ==
- Juvy (disambiguation)
