= Concord Biotech =

Indian biotechnology company

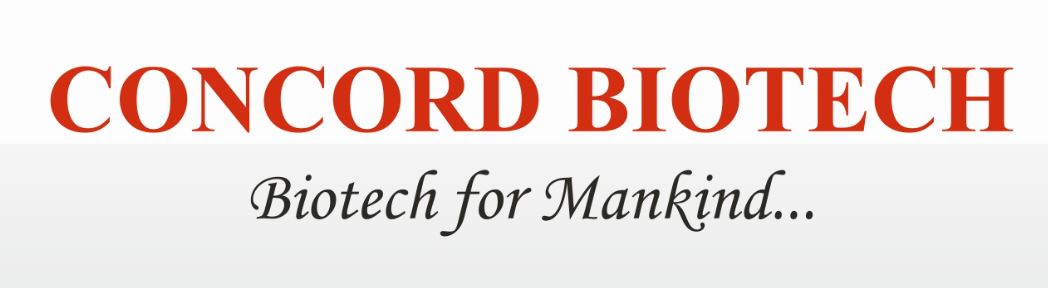
- Type: Public
- Traded as: NSE: CONCORDBIO; BSE: 543960
- Industry: Biotechnology
- Founded: 2000
- Founder: Sudhir Vaid
- Headquarters: Ahmedabad, Gujarat, India
- Area served: Worldwide
- Key people: Sudhir Vaid (Chairman & MD); Ankur Vaid (CEO)
- Products: Biologics; Small molecules Active ingredient
- Revenue: ▲₹1,016 crore (US$110 million) (FY24)
- Operating income: ▲₹466 crore (US$48 million) (FY24)
- Net income: ▲₹308 crore (US$32 million) (FY24)
- Number of employees: 1,180 (2022)
- Website: www.concordbiotech.com

Concord Biotech Limited (CBL) is an Indian biotechnology company headquartered in Ahmedabad. The company manufactures fermentation-based biopharmaceutical active pharmaceutical ingredients (APIs) sold worldwide.

It manufactures biopharmaceutical products across therapy segments such as immunosuppressant, oncology, antifungal, antibacterial and anthelmintic. It has two manufacturing facilities–at Dholka near Ahmedabad, which is approved by USFDA, and at Limbasi in Kheda district.

== History ==
Concord Biotech was founded in 2000 by Sudhir Vaid, a former director at Ranbaxy Laboratories. It was the first company in India, and the second in the world to develop an anti-immuno suppressant tacrolimus.

In 2004, Rakesh Jhunjhunwala acquired around 14% stake in the company. In 2005, Hyderabad-based Matrix Laboratories acquired 55% stake in the company, by buying partial shareholding of Vaid and Jhunjhunwala. After Matrix Laboratories was acquired by Mylan, the latter sold back its stake in Concord Biotech to Vaid and Jhunjhunwala in 2009.

Quadria Capital acquired a 20% stake in Concord Biotech in 2016. Jhunjhunwala's Rare Enterprises holds 24% stake in the company. Quadria Capital sold its entire stake in Concord Biotech's 2023 initial public offering.

== See also ==
- Divi's Laboratories
- Biocon
