= St. Jude Catholic Church =

St. Jude Catholic Church could refer to:

- St. Jude Catholic Church (Allen, Texas), a Catholic church in Allen, Texas, United States
- St. Jude Melkite Catholic Church, a Catholic church in Miami, Florida, United States
- St. Simon & St. Jude Church (Tignish), a Catholic church in Tignish, Prince Edward Island, Canada
