= Jiu =

Jiu, JIU or JiU may refer to:

- Jiu (river), a tributary of the Danube in Romania
- Alcoholic beverages, known as jiǔ (酒) in Chinese
- Ținutul Jiu, a former administrative division of Romania
- Joint Inspection Unit, a United Nations entity
- IATA code of Jiujiang Lushan Airport, China
- Jino language, ISO 639-3 language code
- Jones International University, a predominantly on-line school located in Centennial, Colorado
- Josai International University, private university in Japan
- JiU, member of Korean girl group Dreamcatcher
- Jiu (璽宇), a Japanese new religion led by Jikōson
- Iota Pegasi, a star also named Jiu

== See also ==
- Jiul de Est, a headwater of the river Jiu in Romania
- Jiul de Vest, a headwater of the river Jiu in Romania
- Târgu Jiu, city in Romania
- Roșia-Jiu, a village in Fărcășești Commune, Gorj County, Romania
