= Ju =

Ju or JU may refer to:

== Names and people ==
- Ju (Korean surname)
- Ju (Korean given name)
- Jū (鞠), Chinese surname
- Ru (surname), romanized Ju in Wade–Giles
- Ji Ju, a semi-legendary ancestor of the Zhou dynasty
- Ju (writer) (born 1958), Burmese writer
- Juh (c. 1825–1883), Apache leader

== Places ==
- Ju (city), a city of the State of Qi during the Warring States Period of China
- Ju (state), a vassal state of the Zhou Dynasty
- Ju County (莒县), of Rizhao, Shandong, China
- Juan de Nova Island, administered by France (FIPS code JU)
- Zhou (country subdivision), pronounced ju in Korean
- Canton of Jura (created in 1979), newest of the 26 Swiss cantons

== Businesses and organizations ==
=== Universities ===
- University of Jordan, located in Amman, Jordan
- Jacksonville University, a university in Jacksonville, Florida, United States
- Jadavpur University, a university in Kolkata, India
- Jahangirnagar University, a public university in Savar, Bangladesh
- Jilin University, in Changchun, Jilin, China
- Jain University, a university in Bangalore, India
- Jacobs University Bremen in Germany
- Jönköping University, in Jönköping, Sweden
- University of South Bohemia in České Budějovice, a public university in České Budějovice, Czech Republic

=== Other businesses and organizations ===
- Air Serbia, IATA airline code
- Junge Union, a conservative youth group in Germany
- Junkers, a German aircraft manufacturer
- joint undertaking, a kind of joint venture

== Other uses ==
- Ju language (Chadic), spoken in Nigeria
- Ju languages, spoken in Botswana, Namibia and Angola
- The Principle of Ju, a philosophical concept in martial arts
- ju, a word for Korean alcoholic beverages
- , symbol for Utsunomiya and Takasaki Lines
- Mongolia (aircraft registration prefix JU)
