= Juvenile =

Juvenile may refer to:

== In general ==
- Juvenile status, or minor (law), prior to adulthood
- Juvenile (organism)

== Music ==
- Juvenile (rapper) (born 1975), stage name of American rapper Terius Gray
- Juveniles, a 2020 studio album by the band Kingswood
- "The Juvenile", a song by Ace of Base

== Film ==
- Juvenile (2000 film), Japanese film
- Juvenile (2017 film), U.S. film

== Sports ==
- Juvenile (greyhounds), a greyhound competition
- A two-year-old horse in horse racing terminology

== Other ==
- Juvenile particles, a type of volcanic ejecta

== See also ==
- Children's literature
- Children's clothing
- Juvenile novel
  - Any of "Heinlein juveniles"
- Juvenile delinquency
- Juvenile hall (juvenile detention center)
- Juvie (disambiguation)
- Juvenilia, works by an author while a youth
- Juvies, 2007 U.S. TV show about a juvenile detention center
- Juvenal (disambiguation)
