= The Crash Moderns =

American power pop band

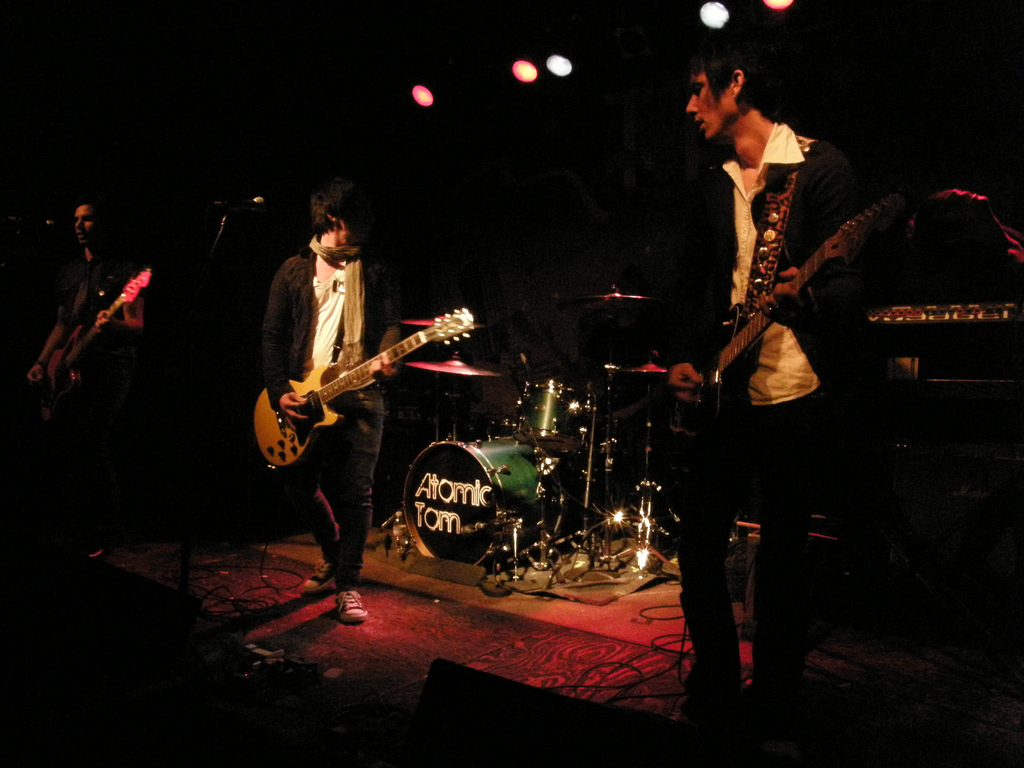
- The Crash Moderns performing in Cambridge, MA in October 2008

Background information
- Origin: New York City
- Genres: Power pop
- Years active: 2004–present
- Members: Danny Roselle aka TRENT; Mikey Vranek; Paolo Dell'Olio
- Website: www.myspace.com/thecrashmoderns

The Crash Moderns are an American power pop band based in New York City, consisting of Danny Roselle on Vox/ Guitar/ Synth, akaTRENT on Bass/Vox, Mikey Vranek on Guitar, Vox, Keys and Paolo Dell'Olio on Drums. In 2008 they released their debut album Good Night Glamour, Good Morning Disaster.

They have opened for such bands as Goo Goo Dolls, Bowling for Soup, American Hi-Fi, The Spill Canvas The Pink Spiders, Eve 6, Live, and Lifehouse. Their biggest gig was opening for Bon Jovi. In 2008, they toured the U.S. including playing the South by Southwest music festival.

Influences cited by the band include The Beatles, The Cars, The Descendents, Weezer, Jimmy Eat World, Elvis Costello, Motion City Soundtrack, and Cheap Trick. Music writers have compared their sound to that of Marvelous 3, Cheap Trick, Green Day, and Elvis Costello.

Before The Crash Moderns, frontman Danny Roselle (born Daniel William Roselle on August 19th) was in the band No Soap Radio, known for their music on The Sopranos. He is also an occasional touring member of the band Dramarama.

Joe Trent, has played with many notable acts including Jersey favorites Lady Radiator. He is well known for his Gaming blog on YouTube under the name "akaTRENT".

Paolo Dell'olio was a previously a member of Milan Italy-based band, The New Story. (EMI)

== History ==
The band's first album, Good Night Glamour, Good Morning Disaster, was recorded at Near Studios in Long Branch, New Jersey. The album was mixed and produced by long-time friends Bart Schoudel and Ron Haney of the band The Churchills. The album was recorded in a span of one and a half months in November/December 2007. Late December 2007, the album was mastered by Chris Ghehringer at Sterling Sound in New York City.

In April 2008, the album was officially released. At first, the album was only available at their live performances, but soon was quickly picked up by the teenage rock/pop culture store Hot Topic. The CD was then only available in the New York/New Jersey region, but has spread since then to different stores throughout the country. Today, the album is available everywhere in the world through iTunes and Amazon.com.

Support for the album started immediately after its release with several east coast tours as well as a nationwide tour in April 2008. Through the Summer into the fall of 2008, the band continued touring and doing festivals. Some shows on these tours included opening slots for The Ataris, Go Radio, The Teenagers, and Eve 6. The band also took part in a very high-profile series of shows in front of thousands on South Padre Island, Texas for the Blender Sessions Spring Break concert alongside artists such as Cartel, Forever the Sickest Kids, and All Time Low.

December 2008, the band found themselves back in the studio recording a cover of The Monroes single "What Do All The People Know?" as well as re-recording several songs off of Good Night Glamour, Good Morning Disaster. This time, they recorded and mixed with Kenny Gioia in Queens, New York.

In August 2010, The Crash Moderns, while still on tour supporting Good Night Glamour, Good Morning Disaster were asked by the US military to travel to Japan to play for the troops stationed on the island of Okinawa. The band also had the chance to showcase in March at the 2009 SXSW Music Festival in Austin, Texas.

== Personnel ==
As of February 2010 the band lineup consists of:

- Danny Roselle -Vox/rhythm guitar/ synth
- Joe "akaTRENT" - bass/ Vox
- Mikey Vranek -lead guitar, keys

== Discography ==
- 2004: The Crash Moderns (EP)
- 2008: Good Night Glamour, Good Morning Disaster
- 2009: Re-recorded songs: "Pimp My Life", "Where Did All the Scene Girls Go?", "This Time", "Everybody Hates Me"
- 2009: "What Do All the People Know?" - Cover song by The Monroes

=== Good Night Glamour, Good Morning Disaster Track listing ===
No.	Title	Length
1.	"This Time"	3:21
2.	"Pimp My Life"	3:28
3.	"Where'd All The Scene Girls Go"	2:57
4.	"Everybody Hates Me"	3:20
5.	"Notice Me"	4:02
6.	"Solid Gold"	3:04
7.	"We've Got Tonite"	2:45
8.	"Make It Stop"	3:04
9.	"Be All That"	2:55
10.	"Hello World"	3:06
11.	"Closer Is Better"	3:30
