= Juvy =

Juvy may refer to:

- Juvie (disambiguation)
- Juventud (disambiguation)
- Juvy Cachola, Filipino film actress
