= María Daniela y su Sonido Lasser =

Mexican electronic music group

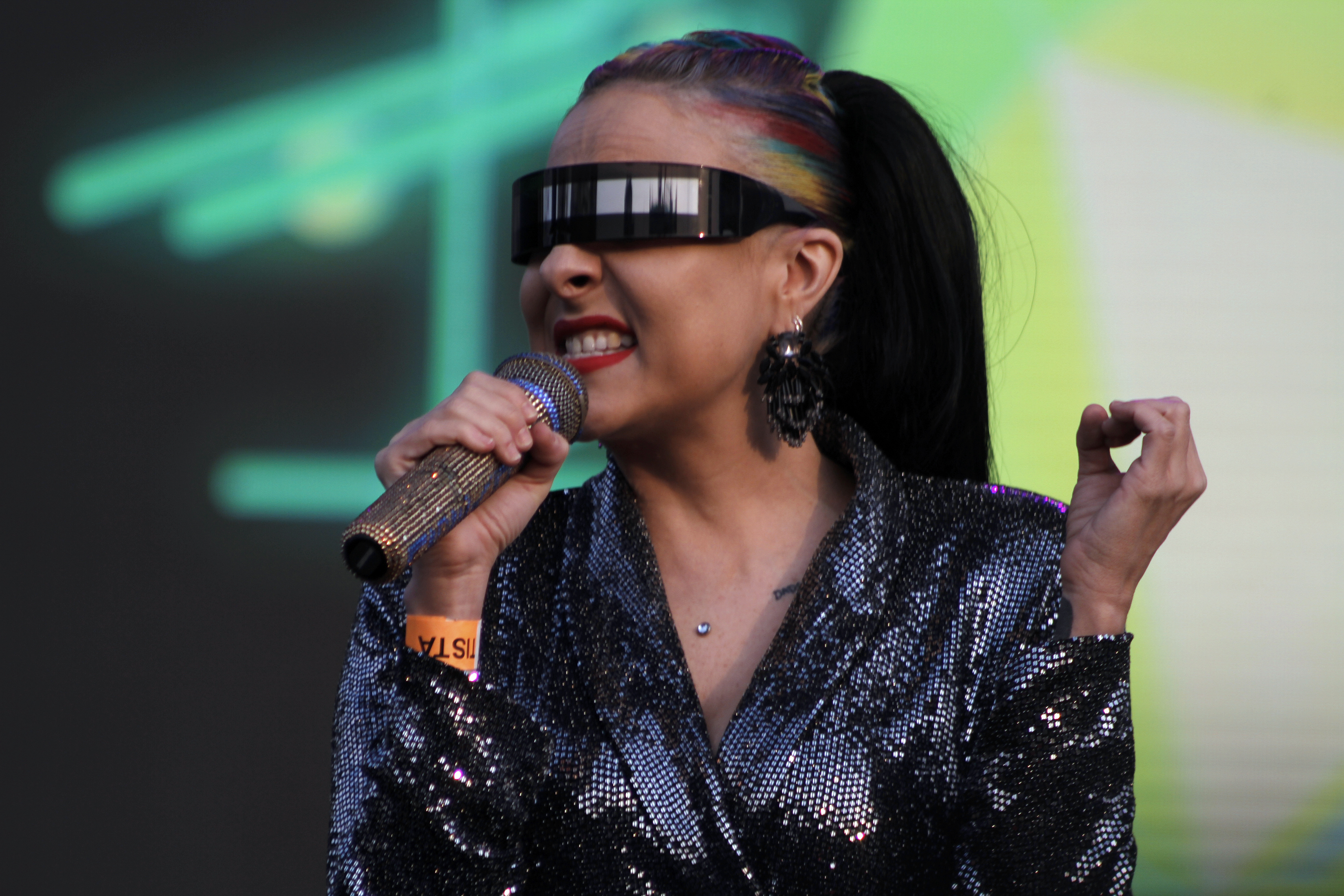
Maria Daniela y su Sonido Lasser on concert in 2018.

María Daniela y su Sonido Lasser is a Mexican electronic group. It consists of the electronic musician Emilio Acevedo and the singer María Daniela Azpiazu. They are one of the most popular projects of the well-known Mexican electronic label Nuevos Ricos.

== Biography ==
In 2007, Emilio Acevedo, already working on other electronic projects such as Titán, started Sonido Lasser Drakar. Exploring the sounds of dance music, he asked a friend, Maria Daniela, to join the group just for fun. In 2003 they released a cover of Aerolíneas Federales "No me beses en los labios", then created the song "Super Vacaciones" (Super vacations) that was part of the soundtrack of the film "Coapa Heights" by Gibran Asuad.

The duo recorded the song "Miedo", which came from an electrocumbia sampler from Sonido Lasser Drakar, and soon started gaining success in the club scene, both in Mexico and worldwide. They began performing as a duo. They joined the "World Domination Tour" of Nuevos Ricos throughout Europe and the United States, and in 2005, they released their first LP "María Daniela y su Sonido Lasser".

María Daniela y su Sonido Lasser like to define their music as Electro Pop for Dance Halls and they hope their sound will invigorate the current Mexican High Energy scene.

They're also famous for the songs "Fiesta de Cumpleaños", "El Tuviera No Existe", "Chicle De Menta", "Pobre Estupida", and "Mentiras", cover of Mexican pop icon Daniela Romo.

They created the theme song for the latest Televisa's reality show, El Bar Provoca.

Their second album "Juventud En Extasis" was released in December 2007. Their third album was released in November 2010, it is titled "Baila Duro".

== Album track lists ==
=== Maria Daniela y su Sonido Lasser ===
1. A Bailar
2. Fiesta de Cumpleaños
3. Mi Primera Vez
4. Beam Laden
5. Mentiras
6. Miedo 2005
7. Abismo
8. Yo no Soy Asi
9. El tuviera no Existe
10. A Media Noche
11. Miedo
12. Track 12
13. Yo no soy asi V2
14. Carita de Angel (bonus track)
15. Chicle de menta (bonus track)
16. Yo no soy una gori! (bonus track)

=== Juventud En Éxtasis ===
1. Pecadora Normal
2. Pobre Estúpida
3. Asesiné A Mi Novio
4. Tu Sombra
5. Es Mejor Así
6. Qué Vas A Hacer
7. Dame Más
8. Pinta Un Bosque
9. Amor Fugaz
10. 100 X Hora
11. Duri Duri
12. Silencio (Juventud en Extasis)
13. Drop The Chalupa (bonus track)

=== Baila Duro ===
1. 1000000 De Besos
2. Baila Duro
3. Garras De Tigre
4. No Te Aguanto Mas
5. Soñando Despierta
6. Yo Tenia Un Novio

=== Vol.Súbele ===
1. Muéveme
2. Soy el Hit
3. Que Triste
4. Autos Cósmicos
5. Cielo Rojo
6. Contigo Me Mecía
7. Party Rider
8. Marimar
9. Teléfono
10. Modern Chimes
11. Zombie 2000
