= Yehudi =

Yehudi or Jehudi (יהודי) is the Hebrew endonym for Jew and a common Hebrew masculine given name. The feminine counterpart is Yehudit. Notable people with the name include:

- Yehudi Menuhin (1916–1999), violinist and conductor
  - Yehudi Menuhin School, a music school in Surrey, England
  - Who's Yehoodi?, a catchphrase referring to the violinist
- Yehudi Wyner (born 1929), composer and pianist
- Jehudi Ashmun (1794–1828), religious leader and social reformer

== See also ==
- Yahud (disambiguation)
- Yehud (disambiguation)
- Yehuda (disambiguation)
- Yuda (disambiguation), / Juda (disambiguation) / Judah (disambiguation)
- Yahudi, a 1958 Indian film
- Yehudi lights, camouflage system for World War II aircraft
