= Judah =

Judah or Yehuda is the name of a biblical patriarch, Judah (son of Jacob). It may also refer to:

== Historical ethnic, political and geographic terms ==
- Tribe of Judah, one of the twelve Tribes of Israel; their allotment corresponds to Judah or Judaea
- Judea, the name of part of the Land of Israel
  - Kingdom of Judah, an Iron Age kingdom of the Southern Levant
    - ancient Israel and Judah
  - Yehud (Persian province), a name introduced in the Babylonian period
  - Hasmonean Judea
  - Judaea (Roman province)
- Or Yehuda, a city in the Tel Aviv District of Israel

== People ==
- Judah (given name), or Yehudah, including a list of people with the name
- Judah (surname)

== Other uses ==
- Judah, Indiana, a small town in the United States
- N Judah, a light rail line in San Francisco, U.S.
- Yehuda Matzos, an Israeli matzo company

== See also ==
- Juda (disambiguation)
- Judas (disambiguation)
- Jude (disambiguation)
- Jew (disambiguation)
- Yehud (disambiguation)
- Yahud (disambiguation)
- Yehudi (disambiguation)
- Yuda (disambiguation)
