= Juif =

Juif may refer to:

== French ==
- Jew: juif is the French masculine form for Jew, Jewish
- Juif, Saône-et-Loire, a commune in the Saône-et-Loire department in the region of Bourgogne in eastern France
- Île aux Juifs (French: Jew Island, lit. 'Island of the Jews'), Seine River, Paris, France; a former island that was landfilled in and became part of Île de la Cité with the construction of Pont Neuf

== Abbreviation ==
- Jamiat Ulema-e-Islam (F) or JUIF, a political party in Pakistan

== See also ==
- Juive (disambiguation): French for Jewess (f.), Jewish (f.)
- Jew (disambiguation)
