= Rio Meão =

Civil parish in Portugal

- Civil parish
- Location in Portugal
- Coordinates: 40.958°N 8.581°W
- Country: Portugal
- Region: Norte
- Metropolitan area: Porto
- District: Aveiro
- Municipality: Santa Maria da Feira

Area
  - Total: 6.68 km^{2} (2.58 sq mi)

Population (2011)
  - Total: 4,931
  - Density: 740/km^{2} (1,900/sq mi)
- Time zone: UTC+00:00 (WET)
  - Summer (DST): UTC+01:00 (WEST)

Rio Meão is a Portuguese parish, located in the municipality of Santa Maria da Feira. The population in 2011 was 4,931, in an area of 6.68 km^{2}.

== History ==
The parish was first mentioned in the 8th century (773) as "Rius Medianus". The name of the parish comes from a small river south of the parish ("Rius Medianus") and is located between Santa Maria da Feira and Paços de Brandão. In 1220, it became a parish.

Sancho I received the parish, the Ordem do Hospitel, it later reorganized into a settlement of the Portuguese territory.

== Sites of interest ==
The parishes contains three historic traditional houses:

- Casa dos Brandões de Tabuaça de Anta
- Casa do Mourão
- Casa da Peredinha

== Sporting club ==
- Juventude Atlética de Rio Meão - football
