= Judas kiss =

Judas kiss may refer to:

- The Kiss of Judas, according to the Bible, the kiss with which Judas Iscariot identified and betrayed Jesus

== Film, television and theatre ==
- Judas' Kiss (1954 film), a Spanish religious drama film
- Judas Kiss (1998 film), a 1998 American crime thriller
- Judas Kiss (2011 film), a 2011 American fiction drama film
- The Judas Kiss (play), a 1998 play by David Hare about Oscar Wilde and Lord Alfred Douglas

== Books ==
- The Judas Kiss, a 2012 novel by David Butler

== Music ==
- "Judas Kiss" a 1988 song by the Del-Lords from the album Based on a True Story
- Judas Kiss (album), a 2013 album by Kee Marcello
- "The Judas Kiss" (song), a 2008 song by Metallica from the album Death Magnetic
- "The Kiss of Judas", a song by Stratovarius from the album Visions
- "Judas' Kiss", a song by Petra from the album More Power to Ya
