= Quadria Capital =

Private equity firm in Singapore

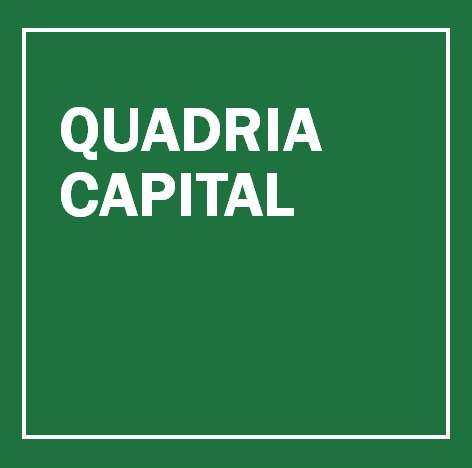
- Type: Private
- Industry: Private equity, Healthcare
- Founded: 2012
- Founder: Abrar Mir, Dr. Amit Varma
- Headquarters: Singapore
- Products: Growth capital
- Number of employees: 10+
- Website: www.quadriacapital.com

Quadria Capital is an independent healthcare focused private equity firm that specializes in growth capital investments in small cap and middle-market companies within the healthcare sector across South and Southeast Asia.

The firm was founded in 2012 by both Abrar Mir and Amit Varma. Quadria is headquartered in Singapore and has its investment advisory firm based out of New Delhi. Over the course, Quadria has evolved into one of Asia's largest healthcare focused private equity investment firms.

== History ==
Quadria was established in 2012 by Abrar Mir and Dr. Amit Varma. Prior to founding Quadria, Abrar Mir led Global Healthcare Investment Banking at Religare Capital Markets, an investment management and brokerage firm and part of Religare, one of Asia's largest financial services firms. Varma is a critical care physician and former Chief Operating Officer and Director of Medical Operations at Fortis Healthcare. In 2013, Quadria Capital acquired Milestone Religare Investment Advisors, with the original management team in place.

In June 2015, Quadria closed its first investment vehicle with a corpus of US$304 million.

== Current Investments ==
- Medica Synergie, hospital group, operating 945 beds, in a highly under-served eastern India market.
- Soho Global Health, among Indonesia's leading integrated pharmaceuticals group, with leadership in the naturals, over-the-counter, and ethical medicines business and healthcare products logistics services.
- Asian Institute of Gastroenterology, one of South Asia's leading gastric sciences hospital and among the 14 centers globally to be recognized as Centre of Excellence by World Endoscopy Organization
- Concord Biotech, one of India's leading vertically integrated manufacturer of fermentation based niche biopharma molecules
- Health Care at Home, an Indian early stage venture providing high-end healthcare delivery services like ICU care, kidney dialysis, cancer care treatment at home
- FV Hospital
- KPJ Lablink
- Medibuddy(UnListed), Krishna Institute of Medical Sciences(Listed), Health Care Global(Listed) are also part of their portfolio in India.

== Links ==
- http://www.quadriacapital.com Quadria Capital (company website)
