= St. Jude Church, Kidangoor =

Church in Kerala, India

Yoodhapuram shrine, in the name of St. Jude, is in Kerala, India. It is situated at Kidangoor around one kilometer from Angamally towards Manjapra. Angamaly is one of the prominent hubs of Syro Malabar Catholics with the proximity of blessed pilgrim center Malayatoor in the name of St. Thomas.

The foundation stone for St. Jude Thaddeus Roman Catholic Church was laid on 26 July 1999.

This landmark church is under the Archdiocese of Verapoly. Besides the mass on every day, the novena and special prayers are conducted on every Thursdays. The feast and associated oottuthirunnal is celebrated during the last week of October every year. Approximately 150,000 people attends the feast on a single day of celebration without any disruption.

In the Roman Catholic Church St. Jude is the patron saint of desperate cases and lost causes. It is believed that, if a person prays with St. Jude and attends the novena for 7–9 days, their problem will have a solution. The believers visiting this shrine include students for higher studies, people suffering from diseases, looking for jobs and dealing with family problems. The church is committed towards helping students who don't have enough financial capacity to complete studies. These activities are done irrespective of the religious, cultural, geographic or political background.
