= The Judas Kiss (song) =

Promotional single by Metallica

from the album Death Magnetic
- Released: September 8, 2008
- Recorded: March 12, 2007 – May 11, 2008
- Studio: Sound City in Van Nuys, Los Angeles, California; Shangri La Studios in Malibu, California and HQ in San Rafael, California
- Genre: Progressive metal; thrash metal; Technical thrash metal
- Length: 8:00
- Label: Warner Bros.
- Composers: James Hetfield; Lars Ulrich; Kirk Hammett; Robert Trujillo
- Lyricist: James Hetfield
- Producer: Rick Rubin

Metallica singles chronology
"Cyanide" (2008)	"The Judas Kiss" (2008)	"All Nightmare Long" (2008)

"The Judas Kiss" is a song by American heavy metal band Metallica, the second promotional single taken from their ninth studio album, Death Magnetic.

On September 8, 2008, it was made available for streaming on the band's official website, as well as a download (for Platinum Members only) from the Death Magnetic website Mission: Metallica. It has since been made available for purchase as a digital single in the iTunes Store. Part of the beginning to "The Judas Kiss" was also featured in an online video on the official website and Mission: Metallica revealing the album's title. The first live performance of the song was at the Trent FM Arena in Nottingham, England, on February 25, 2009, as part of their opening gig in the European leg of their World Magnetic Tour.

== Track listing ==
Digital

== Charts ==
Chart (2008)	Peak position
Canada Hot 100 (Billboard)	71
Finland (Suomen virallinen lista)	20
Italy (FIMI)	69
Norway (VG-lista)	13
Sweden (Sverigetopplistan)	44
US Billboard Bubbling Under Hot 100 Singles	12

== Personnel ==
Metallica

- James Hetfield – rhythm guitar, vocals
- Lars Ulrich – drums
- Kirk Hammett – lead guitar
- Robert Trujillo – bass guitar

Additional personnel

- Rick Rubin – producer
- Ted Jensen – mastering
- Greg Fidelman – mixing
