= Adele Juda =

Austrian psychiatrist

- Born: 9 March 1888; Munich
- Died: 31 October 1949 (aged 61); Innsbruck
- Scientific career
- Thesis: Zum Problem der empirischen Erbprognosebestimmung (1929)
- Academic advisors: Ernst Rüdin

Adele Juda (9 March 1888 – 31 October 1949) was an Austrian psychologist and neurologist. She studied the incidence of mental illness in gifted and creative German-speaking people. One of those included in her studies was Mozart, whom she deemed to be 'psychiatrically normal'.

== Early life and education ==
Adele Juda's father Karl was a graphic artist and director of a printing house; her mother was Maria. During her youth her family moved around and lived in Prague, Munich, and Innsbruck. She played the piano and received musical education. She had planned to become a pianist, but a movement disorder in her left hand prevented this. While being treated she met Editha Senger, who later married Ernst Rüdin.

In 1922, Juda started studying medicine at the Ludwig-Maximilians-Universität München. She completed her Physikum, an exam in German medical studies, in Innsbruck in 1923, before returning to Munich. Here she received her MD in 1929 with the thesis "Zum Problem der empirischen Erbprognosebestimmung" (The problem of empirical hereditary prognosis). During her medical studies she worked as an assistant to Ernst Rüdin. Under him, she started the study of highly gifted individuals.

She ended her studies in the last month of the Second World War, and returned to Innsbruck in 1945. Here she worked as a specialist in nervous and mood disorders from her own home. She also worked until her death at the 'Zentralstelle für Familienbiologie und Sozialpsychiatrie' (Central office for Family Biology and Social Psychiatry) with Rudolf Cornides and Friedrich Stumpfl. She eventually died from poliomyelitis on 31 October 1949.

== Research ==
Between 1928 and 1944, Juda studied the biographies of 19,000 German-speaking people, including scientists, artists and at least 27 musicians. She performed this study under Ernst Rüdin. At the time it was believed that genius and insanity were linked, which was an idea published by Cesare Lombroso. Juda found no relation between mental illness and high intellectual capability. However, she noted that geniuses and their families showed a higher occurrence of psychosis, but concluded that psychosis impaired creativity. In a subgroup of 113 artists and writers she found a high occurrence of neurosis and suicide, specifically in poets. Their families were also more likely to have some form of mental illness.

Her research was criticised, as her inclusion criteria were rather ambiguous, and the diagnostic methods used in her time were not great at distinguishing between different schizophrenia and bipolar disorder.
