= Jou =

Jou or JOU may refer to:

== Places ==
- Jou (Murça), a parish of the municipality of Murça, Portugal
- Jou-sous-Monjou, a commune in Cantal, France
- Jou (Aveyron), a hamlet in Thérondels commune, Aveyron, France

== People ==
- Jou (raja) (fl. 1815), raja of Adonara, Indonesia
- Jou Silva (born 1987), Brazilian footballer
- Jou Howard, Big data and database practitioner, USA
- Zhou (surname), a Chinese surname

== Other uses ==
- Jō, a staff used in Japanese martial arts
- Zou people or Jou, ethnic group in India and Myanmar

== See also ==
- Jo (disambiguation)
