= The Jews (play) =

Die Juden (German pronunciation: [diː ˈjuːdn̩]; English: The Jews) is German-language play by Gotthold Ephraim Lessing. Written in 1749 in Berlin, it was staged 1754. Like the same author's Nathan der Weise the play pleads for religious tolerance and is generally seen as sympathetic to the Jewish people.
