= Jew Peak =

Mountain in Montana, United States

Coordinates: 47.74743°N 115.72183°W

Jew Peak is a summit in Sanders County, Montana, in the United States. It has an elevation of 5,853 feet (1,784 m). Jew Peak is the 2,010th highest mountain in the state of Montana.

The name Jew Peak was likely meant to honor a person.
