= Jude (surname) =

Jude is a surname. Notable people with the surname include:

- Anton Jude (1960–2012), Sri Lankan actor
- Brian Jude (born 1971), American screenwriter, film producer, director, actor, internet radio host and motivational speaker
- George W. Jude (1867–1958), American politician
- James Jude (1928–2015), American thoracic surgeon
- Radu Jude (born 1977), Romanian film director
- Tad Jude (born 1951), American judge and politician
- Victor N. Jude (1923–1994), American businessman and politician

== See also ==
- Jude (given name)
