= Juvies (TV series) =

- Genre: Reality television
- Created by: Karen Grau
- Directed by: Karen Grau
- Theme music composer: The Churchills
- Opening theme: "Sometimes Your Best Isn't Good Enough" by The Churchills
- Composer: Simon Heselev
- Country of origin: United States
- Original language: English
- No. of seasons: 1
- No. of episodes: 8

Production
- Executive producers: Kevin Dill; Karen Grau; Lily Neumeyer; Bill Hussung
- Producer: John Salcido
- Cinematography: Piers Bath; I-Li Chen
- Running time: 60 minutes approx.

Original release
- Network: MTV
- Release: February 1 – March 22, 2007

Juvies is an MTV (Calamari Productions), and later MSNBC television show following minors in the Lake County, Indiana Juvenile Justice Complex. The series' first and only season debuted on MTV in February 2007, and has re-aired regularly since. On July 30, 2008, the NWI Times reported that production was underway for another documentary series also to be filmed at the Lake County Juvenile Justice Complex in Crown Point, Indiana. The MSNBC version, re-branded as "Lockup - Lake County Juvenile Justice," takes a deeper look at the inner workings of the LCJC detention and court systems, and it ventures into other correctional facilities in Indiana, and premiered on MSNBC on July 4, 2009 at 10:00 E.T.

== Overview ==
Both the MTV and MSNBC versions of Juvies depict what happens to offenders in the Indiana Juvenile Justice system. The show features a behind the scenes look at the detention center and court process as it follows kids charged with committing relatively minor offenses such as underage drinking, minor theft, marijuana use, running away, etc.

Each episode follows two youths from their initial intake in the detention center to their "Detention Hearing" where a judge hears evidence on whether to keep the child detained, or release the child to their parents or elsewhere, pending a trial on the underlying charges. The series does not cover the trial on the charges themselves, however a brief epilogue appears at the end of each hour-long episode updating viewers on the eventual outcome of the case.

They have some special shorts called Life After Juvies on MTV, where it shows how the child is doing after being a juvie.

The unprecedented access (including voluminous amounts of CCTV footage) to the juvenile court system, which is typically closed, was obtained by Calamari Productions from the Indiana Supreme Court.

The song "Sometimes Your Best Isn't Good Enough", performed by The Churchills, is the theme of the show.

== Cast ==
=== Judge ===
All of the featured children appear before Lake County Indiana Superior Court Judge Mary Beth Bonaventura.

=== Defense attorneys ===
Each child is represented at their detention hearing by a defense attorney - either an appointed public defender or private attorney hired by the family. The Lake County Juvenile Court uses part time public defenders who also maintain private law practices.

Attorneys who appear in episodes on behalf of the children include Donald Wruck, a trial lawyer at Wruck Paupore PC, and solo practitioners, Geoff Giorgi, and Deidre Monroe.

=== Prosecuting attorneys ===
The State of Indiana is represented by a deputy prosecuting attorney, who elicits testimony and presents evidence in support of the charges pending against the child. However, because the hearings depicted on "MTV Juvies" are detention hearings, the issues are limited to whether the child should be detained awaiting trial.

The deputy prosecuting attorney appearing in several episodes is Kathy Guzek.

== Episodes ==
No.	Title	Directed by	Defense attorney(s)	Original release date
1	"Cordell and Sara"	Karen Grau	Don Wruck (Cordell), Deidre Monroe (Sara)	February 1, 2007
2	"Ryan and LaRico"	Karen Grau	Deidre Monroe	February 8, 2007
3	"Sierra and Rashad"	Karen Grau	Geoff Giorgi (Rashad), Deidre Monroe (Sierra)	February 15, 2007
4	"Kashmeire and Francesca"	Karen Grau	Don Wruck	February 22, 2007
5	"Steve and Javier"	Karen Grau	Don Wruck	March 1, 2007
6	"Karissa and Nathan"	Karen Grau	Don Wruck	March 8, 2007
7	"RJ, Jasmine and Jacinta"	Karen Grau	Don Wruck (RJ)	March 15, 2007
8	"Dale and Jeff"	Karen Grau	Diedre Monroe	March 22, 2007

== Ratings ==
The show achieved record high ratings for MTV across dual demographics.
