= Calamari Productions =

American film distribution company

Calamari Productions is an American multi-award winning independent film and digital content distribution company based in Los Angeles, California.

== History and background ==
The company is the only media production company in the United States with state Supreme Court access to film inside America's child welfare and juvenile courts, juvenile detention centers, and juvenile prisons.

Calamari's access has resulted in numerous award-winning documentary films and network television series for outlets including MTV, Dateline NBC, A&E, Court TV, ABC News, MSNBC, PBS and more. The company's unprecedented foray into the U.S. juvenile justice system is unique because these venues are—by law—closed to the media and general public.

== Streaming media ==
In 2020, the company launched a first-ever streaming education platform, Society Education Media, an online platform offering educators, students, advocates and professionals unprecedented video access to the closed world of America's juvenile justice and social work arenas.

== Awards ==
- Edward R. Murrow Award - Best Writing
- National Edward R. Murrow Award - Best Documentary
- National Emmy Nominee - Best Documentary
- Emmy Award- Best Documentary
- Emmy Award - Best Writing
- National Headliner Award - News Documentary
- Columbus International Film Festival - Award Winner
- Headliner Award
- Casey Medal For Meritorious Journalism - Television: Long Form
- National IRE Award- Television: Network/Syndicated
- American Society On The Abuse Of Children - Outstanding Media Coverage
- Anna Quindlen Child Welfare League of America Award - Excellence in reporting on behalf of children and families
- Council of Juvenile and Family Court Judges Award - Exceptional Contribution to the Juvenile Courts
- IARRCA "Friend of the Child" Award - Efforts on Behalf of Children
- Associated Press Broadcasters Award - First Place
- Best Coverage of Children's Issues - Society of Professional Journalists

== Sources ==
- The National Council of Juvenile and Family Court Judges Magazine/Summer 2002
- The New York Times (April 12, 2002)
- Chicago Public Radio (March 8, 2007)
- The Northwest Indiana Times (February 2, 2007)
- The Gary Post Tribune (January 28, 2007)
