= Jute (disambiguation) =

Jute is a long, soft, shiny vegetable fiber that can be spun into coarse, strong threads.

Jute may also refer to:

- Jutes, a Germanic people
- Corchorus, a genus of plants from which the fiber is derived
  - Corchorus capsularis, white jute
  - Corchorus olitorius, Nalta jute or Tossa jute
- Abutilon theophrasti, Chinese jute
- Hibiscus cannabinus, Java jute
- Ministry of Textiles and Jute
