= Jikōson =

Japanese religious leader (1903–1984)

- 璽光尊
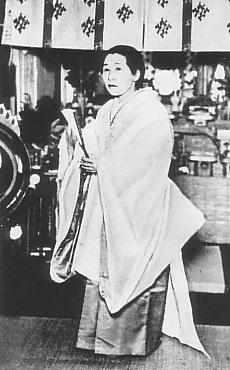
- Born: Naga Ōsawa; 22 April 1903; Ehime, Mitsu, Okayama, Empire of Japan
- Died: 1983/1984 (aged 80/81); Japan
- Other names: Nagako Nagaoka
- Occupations: Nurse, religious leader
- Organization: Jiu
- Spouse: Sadao Nagaoka
- Parents: Ikumatsu Ōsawa (father); Katsu (mother)

Jikōson (璽光尊; 22 April 1903 – 1983/1984), born Naga Ōsawa (大沢 奈賀, Ōsawa Naga) and later known as Nagako Nagaoka (長岡 良子, Nagaoka Nagako), was a Japanese medium, spiritual healer and the leader of a new religion known as "Jiu". She claimed to be the representative of Amaterasu and the ruler of Japan. She was the first of several female leaders of Japanese new religions to attract public attention in the late 1940s.

== Early life ==
Naga Ōsawa was born in the village of Ehime, Mitsu, Okayama in a well-to-do farming family, the fifth daughter of Ikumatsu Ōsawa (大沢 幾松, Ōsawa Ikumatsu) and Katsu (力ツ). Though, after becoming a religious figure, she would claim that she was adopted by the Ōsawas, and her true lineage could be traced to the Okayama Ikeda clan and further to the Kuni-no-miya branch of the imperial family. After finishing a year of junior high school, she worked at an ophthalmology clinic at Ibara as a student nurse. In 1924, she moved to Kobe to attend night school while working as a nurse during the day. There, she contracted tuberculosis, and in 1927 she was forced to return to her job at the ophthalmology clinic in Ibara. During this time, she would often visit a local Zen temple as she recuperated.

When she was 25, she entered into an arranged marriage with Sadao Nagaoka (長岡 貞雄, Nagaoka Sadao), an employee of the Japan Post, and the couple moved to Yokohama. Three years into her marriage, she started having severe episodes of fever. She would fall in and out of trances while making various predictions and declarations. In around 1933, she was taken to the University of Tokyo hospital while having a high fever, and was diagnosed with polio but was never treated.

According to her own recollections, she had her spiritual awakening in 1934, where she received a revelation from various Buddhist, Christian and Shinto deities. From 1935 onwards, tales of her vivid visions and her own charisma attracted a small group of followers. After leaving her husband in 1935, she began working as a spiritual healer in Yokohama and Kamata, Tokyo. She would also change her name to Nagaka (良子), though keeping her husband's surname, and thus was known as Nagako Nagaoka.

== Early religious career ==
While working in Tokyo, one of Nagaoka's followers introduced her to Kyōhei Minemura (峰村 恭平, Minemura Kyōhei). Minemura was a businessman who, together with his brother-in-law and medium Mitsuo Minemura (峰村 三夫, Minemura Mitsuo), founded Kōdō Daikyō (皇道大教), a Shinto study circle. From 1936 to 1942, Minemura commissioned Nagaoka to conduct rites and provide guidance for conducting businesses at his copper mine. During this time, her relationship with Minemura and influence in Kōdō Daikyō increased steadily.

In the meantime, also developing in Tokyo was Red Swastika Society, a China-based organization operating clandestinely in Japan, as the Japanese government rejected the introduction of a Chinese religion in the country. The Japanese supporters of Kōmanjikai Dōin disbanded in 1940, and a number of its supporters joined Kōdō Daikyō, due to the similar spiritual aspects of the two groups. Go chess-master Go Seigen, who was involved with the Kōmanjikai Dōin, became a follower of Nagaoka during this time. In 1941, Kōdō Daikyō changed its name to Jiu (璽宇). Jiu members also introduced Nagaoka to some ideas of Oomoto, which helped to form Nagaoka's belief in a "world renewal" and influenced her rituals.

In 1943, she published Makoto no hito (真の人, lit. 'True people'), a collection of her teachings which preached a "world renewal" following a period of chaos. She believed in a divine, peaceful land that would emerge following "convulsions of nature". The publication, along with Minemura's own mining business, attracted the attention of the police, who conducted a raid on Jiu lodgings (where Nagaoka and a number of her followers lived) on 8 February 1945. After discovering a copy of Makoto no hito, Nagaoka was arrested and imprisoned for about a month, until her release on 3 March. After her release, Minemura fell ill and his mining business declined. Minemura and his close followers evacuated from Tokyo during an Allied bombing of Tokyo on 25 May 1945, and Nagaoka declared herself the new spiritual center of Jiu on 31 May, cementing her role as the leader of Jiu.

== Leader of Jiu ==
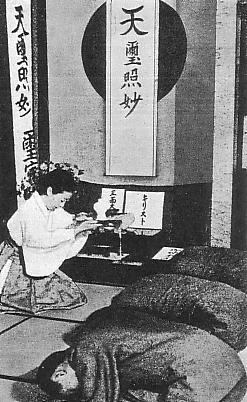
Jiu rituals

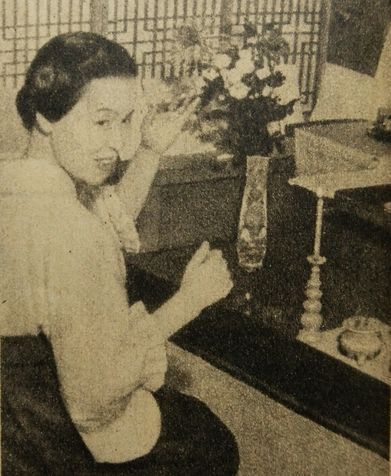
Nagaoka in her Suginami "palace", taken by Asahi Shimbun reporters against her permission, 25 October 1946

At this time, somewhere between ten and thirty followers would live in the same house as Nagaoka, though not all members lived with her. Nagaoka's leadership saw a religious focus on her oracles, performed through spirit-writing, which became the infallible authority of Jiu. Not only did the oracles set out the details of the world renewal process and post-world renewal society under the kami, but also the day-to-day activities of her followers, leadership roles and financial decisions. One such oracle, performed on 22 June, delivered the word Jikō (璽光). Thereafter, her followers referred to Nagaoka as Jikōson. They also prayed for the return of Amaterasu to deliver the world from chaos, while financially surviving on donations from followers and benefactors.

In July 1945, after their landlord reported the group to the police, Nagaoka was arrested under charges of lèse-majesté and released after ten days. On 12 July, Nagaoka declared herself to be the representative of Amaterasu, believing that she was sent to help the Emperor through the "holy war" (the bombing of Tokyo and Yokohama).

=== Post-war activities ===
Following the surrender of Japan, the group intensified their activities, believing that a second phase of world renewal had arrived. They began attempting to contact the imperial family to inform them of their role in world renewal, while enduring the occupation of Japan as divine punishment from the kami. The group was constantly under threats of police arrests and eviction, leading to a series of "oracles" that dictated them to move their headquarters ("palaces"). After Hirohito made his Humanity Declaration in 1946, Jiu shifted their attention from the imperial family to the public. A series of oracles in May 1946 declared Nagaoka as the true imperial leader of Japan, who would rule in the new Reiju (霊寿, lit. 'era of the spirits') era.

The group's public rituals included eating donated rice gruel, which attracted both followers (malnutrition was a major problem during early occupation) along with police and media attention. According to a SCAP report, about a hundred followers were observed participating in a public ritual. Police surveillance intensified after members of Jiu, believing that Supreme Commander for the Allied Powers Douglas MacArthur was now part of the world renewal, stopped MacArthur's car outside the United States embassy in an attempt to make contact with him in May 1946. Go Seigen, who was still a famous public figure, became a key figure in their campaign. The recently retired but popular sumo wrestler Futabayama Sadaji also became a follower. In October 1946, the Asahi Shimbun visited the group's compound in Suginami.

=== Kanazawa incident ===
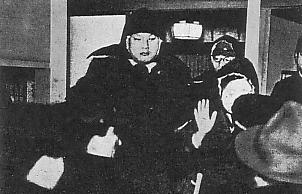
Futabayama Sadaji stopping police from entering the Jiu compound during the Kanazawa incident

The attention caused the group's landlord to evict them in November 1946. The group moved to Kanazawa next month, though the travels had weakened Nagaoka, which was viewed by her followers to represent dangers facing the nation. The sight of Go Seigen and Futabayama Sadaji, two celebrities in the town of Kanazawa, along with seemingly-fulfilled prophecies of earthquakes attracted more media attention. Their activities also attracted an Asahi Shimbun journalist who, hoping to see his acquaintance Futabayama return to the sumo wrestling world, investigated the group and reported his information to the local police. The local police was, in turn, concerned about Jiu using Futabayama's celebrity status to spread their beliefs. With the journalist's information, the police raided the group's headquarters on 18 January 1947, though Nagaoka refused to meet with the police.

On 21 January, after learning that Nagaoka and her followers were planning to escape the town at night, the police raided the headquarters a second time, arresting Nagaoka along with Futabayama (who attempted to fight off the police) in front of groups of journalists and cameramen, who would later term the raid "Kanazawa incident (金沢事件, Kanazawajiken)" or the "Jikōson incident (璽光尊事件, Jikōsonjiken)". The charges cited by the police were violation of food laws (food were accumulated for the apocalypses) and ownership of prohibited weapons, including several old swords and knives. Nagaoka was examined by a Kanazawa University doctor, who concluded that she was suffering from delusions but not a danger to the public. As a result, she was released on 23 January with no charges, though Jiu was now branded as an "evil cult" by the media. Nagaoka's psychological examination by a university doctor was seen by the media as a sign that she was mentally unstable, though the results actually exonerated her of mental illnesses. Jiu's reputation following the Kanazawa incident never recovered.

=== Later life ===
The group moved out of Kanazawa on 20 May 1947, and membership dwindled. Media attention had shifted to Tenshō Kōtai Jingūkyō, another religious movement, in the middle of 1947. By 1948, the group was relocated to a house offered by a follower in Hachinohe, though the follower's concerned family members would later hire men to retrieve the follower, leading to a brawl. There was also a police raid, where the group was investigated for violating food laws. After these events, the group moved from place to place, maintaining a subdued existence where they were constantly harassed by the police or the public. In the 1950s, Nagaoka continued to demand visits from a number of public figures, as she had before the Kanazawa incident. Some, such as Heibonsha founder Yasaburō Shimonaka, novelist Yasunari Kawabata and actor Musei Tokugawa did end up visiting Nagaoka after receiving her invitations.

She died in 1983 or 1984, with Tokujirō Katsuki (勝木 徳次郎, Katsuki Tokujirō) succeeding her as the leader of Jiu.
