= Júdás =

- Directed by: Michael Curtiz
- Written by: Iván Siklósi
- Release date: 1918
- Country: Hungary
- Language: Hungarian

Júdás is a 1918 Hungarian film directed by Michael Curtiz to a script by Iván Siklósi. It stars Gyula Gál, Lajos Kemenes, Leopold Kramer.
