= Juventude Atlética de Rio Meão =

Portuguese football club

The Juventude Atlética de Rio Meão is a Portuguese football (soccer) club in the parish of Rio Meão, municipality of Santa Maria da Feira, the district of Aveiro. The club was founded in 1976. Its current president is Carlos Ferreira.

== League ==
Aveiro First District Division (2005–2006)

== Stadium ==
Campo Padre Joaquim Sousa Lamas (2.000 people)
