= Jew Point =

Coordinates: 25.28651°N 80.32867°W

Jew Point is a headland in Monroe County, Florida.

The waters near Jew Point offer boaters on the Intracoastal Waterway as a place of refuge during bad weather.

The name Jew Point was named after Logan Ermans. Nevertheless, media commentators have questioned the appropriateness of the name.
