= Saint Juvenal =

Saint Juvenal may refer to:

- Juvenal of Benevento (died 132), Italian saint
- Juvenal of Narni (died 369), Bishop of Narni
- Juvenal of Jerusalem (died 458), Bishop of Jerusalem

== See also ==
- Giovenale Ancina (died 1604), beatus
- Juvenaly of Alaska (1761–1795), first martyr of the Russian Orthodox church in the Americas
