= St. Jude Catholic Church (Allen, Texas) =

Coordinates: 33.1215°N 96.6507°W

- St. Jude Catholic Church
- Location: 1515 Greenville Ave, Allen TX 75002
- Country: United States
- Denomination: Roman Catholicism
- Website: http://www.stjudeparish.com/

History
- Founded: 1981

St. Jude Catholic Church is a Catholic parish of the Diocese of Dallas. It is the first Catholic Church in Allen, Texas, it was established in 1981. A new sanctuary was opened in 2005.

== Works of art ==
Allen native Andy Buchanan was commissioned to create his interpretation of the renowned Giotto fresco, "Jesus Washes the Feet of the Apostles". This 120-square-foot (11 m^{2}) mural is in the arch above the main doors to the church.

Seattle artist Cody Harrington was commissioned to create 14 original pencil sketches for the sanctuary of the Stations of the Cross, or Via Dolorosa, inspired by the 2004 Mel Gibson film, The Passion of the Christ. The stained glass in the flying roof and transepts are by Cavallini of San Antonio, Texas. The wood carved statues and crucifix are by Ferdinando Perathoner of Ortisei, Italy.
