= Judas goat (disambiguation) =

A Judas goat is a goat used to lead sheep or cattle to a specific destination, sometimes to slaughter.

Judas goat or Judas Goat may also refer to:

== Literature ==
- The Judas Goat, a 1952 novel by Leslie Edgley
- The Judas Goat, a 1978 Spenser novel by Robert B. Parker
- The Judas Goats, The Enemy Within, a 2006 nonfiction book by Michael Collins Piper

== Television ==
- "Judas Goat", Lassie (1954) season 6, episode 17 (1960)
- "Judas Goat", The F.B.I. season 7, episode 18 (1972)
- "The Judas Goat", Five Fingers (American) episode 13 (1960)
- "The Judas Goat", Wide Country episode 21 (1963)
- "The Judas Goat", Keep It in the Family (1980) series 3, episode 2 (1981)
- "The Judas Goat", The Life and Legend of Wyatt Earp season 4, episode 29 (1959)
- "The Judas Goat", Logan's Run episode 9 (1977)
- "The Judas Goat" (The Punisher), an episode of The Punisher

== Other uses ==
- Assembly ship, also known as a Judas goat, a bomber aircraft used by the U.S. Air Force in World War II to lead formations
