= Solomon Henry Jackson =

- Born: England
- Died: 13 February 1846; New York City, New York USA

Solomon Henry Jackson (died 13 Feb 1847, New York City) was a pioneer American Jewish printer.

== Biography ==
An immigrant from England, Jackson settled in Pike County, Pennsylvania, around 1787 and married Helen Miller, the daughter of a local Presbyterian minister.

In the 1820s, Jackson moved to New York City. He was the first Jewish printer there, with a Hebrew printing press which also featured English fonts.

Jackson published the first Jewish periodical in the United States. It was an anti-missionary journal entitled The Jew: being a defence of Judaism against all adversaries, and particularly against the insidious attacks of "Israel's Advocate" ("Israel's Advocate; or, the Restoration of the Jews contemplated and urged", a publication of the American Society for Meliorating the Condition of the Jews, was a missionary publication endeavoring to convert Jews to Christianity). Twenty-four issues of The Jew appeared between March 1823 and March 1825. He also published the first Hebrew prayer book in the United States, and the first Haggadah in the United States.
