= Juventud En Extasis =

Maria Daniela y su Sonido Lasser

Studio album by Maria Daniela y su Sonido Lasser
- Released: November 7, 2007
- Genre: Electropop
- Label: Nuevos Ricos

Maria Daniela y su Sonido Lasser chronology
Maria Daniela y Su Sonido Lasser (2005)	Maria Daniela y su Sonido Lasser (2007)

Juventud en Éxtasis is the second full-length album from Mexican's Maria Daniela y su Sonido Lasser. It was released in November 2007.

== Track listing ==
1. Pecadora Normal
2. Pobre Estúpida
3. Yo Asesiné A Mi Novio
4. Tu Sombra
5. Es Mejor Así
6. Qué Vas A Hacerme
7. Dame Más
8. Pinta Un Bosque
9. Amor Fugaz
10. 100 X Hora
11. Duri Duri
12. Drop The Chalupa (Bonus Track)
13. Juventud en Extasis
