= The Churchills (American band) =

American indie pop/rock band

- Origin: New York metropolitan area, U.S.
- Genres: Rock, Indie pop
- Years active: 1997–2005
- Label: Universal Music Group
- Past members: Ron Haney; Bart Schoudel; Tom Cottone; Jed Higgerson; Phil Bloom; Kim Henry; Alex Smolinski; Scott Haskitt; Greg Winchell

The Churchills were an American indie pop/rock band from the New York metropolitan area established by Ron Haney, Bart Schoudel and Kim Henry. They were signed to Universal Music Group.

== History ==
The Churchills toured the U.S., Europe and Japan, performing with OK Go, The National, and They Might Be Giants. In the summer of 2000, they released their major label debut album titled "You Are Here", featuring several tracks from their 1997 indie release MAGNIFIQUE 400. The album was produced by Mark Hart (Crowded House, Supertramp) and Steve Dudas (Ringo Starr, Aerosmith). Other releases include "Big Ideas" and "The Odds of Winning." The group disbanded in 2005.

After the breakup of the band, both Ron Haney and Bart Schoudel went on to write, produce, tour and record with other artists, sometimes under the name Low Sunday. Haney co-wrote and played guitar on the song "Tell You Something" (Nana's Reprise) on the Alicia Keys album, As I Am, and played guitar on her following record The Element of Freedom. He also played with Alicia Keys and her backing band at the 2007 Black Ball, performing songs with Gwen Stefani, Sheryl Crow and Bono. Haney currently writes, records and produces music for artists, film, and television, out of his home studio. He also plays in a number of bands including Bobby Bandiera and Williams Honor. As a member of Bobby Bandiera's band, he has performed with Bruce Springsteen, Southside Johnny and Gary U.S. Bonds. Bart Schoudel is a two-time Grammy-nominated engineer and a producer for his work with Justin Bieber on Purpose and Beyoncé on her self-titled album. He has collaborated with Camila Cabello, Zara Larsson, Kelly Rowland, LSD, and Fifth Harmony. Kim Henry is now a member of Emperors of Wyoming featuring Butch Vig along with one-time Churchills drummer Alex Smolinski.

== In other media ==
The band appeared in a season three episode of Spin City, performed their song "Everybody Gets What They Deserve" at the end of the show in front of the Flatiron Building in Manhattan. This episode was subsequently shown as part of a flashback episode the following week and the song became the theme song for Michael's character and Nikki played by Connie Britton. The song is also featured in the TV show Scrubs. Meadow Soprano wears the band's T-shirt in Episode 3 of Season 2 of The Sopranos, and again in Episode 3 of Season 3. The band's music was featured on ER, The O.C., Third Watch, and Everwood. Their song "Sometimes Your Best Isn't Good Enough" was the theme song for the MTV show Juvies. The music video for the song features a young Oscar Isaac running through the streets of Brooklyn.

== Personnel ==
- Ron Haney (vocals, guitar)
- Bart Schoudel (bass)
- Tom Cottone
- Jed Higgerson (guitar)

Former Members:

- Phil Bloom (drums)
- Kim Henry (guitar, vocals)
- Alex Smolinski (drums)
- Scott Haskitt (drums)
- Greg Winchell (guitar)

== Discography ==
=== Albums ===
- MAGNIFIQUE 400 (1997)
- You Are Here (2000)
- Big Ideas (2002)
- The Odds of Winning (2005)
