= Jew Mountain =

Mountain in the American state of Montana

Coordinates: 45°40′45″N 114°13′30″W

Jew Mountain is a summit in Ravalli County, Montana, in the United States. With an elevation of 7,972 feet (2,430 m), Jew Mountain is the 961st highest summit in the state of Montana.

It was most likely named for Morris Steinberg, a Jewish gold-prospector who owned a mining operation in the area. A stream which runs down the east face of the mountain was formerly named 'Kyke Creek,' a slur for Jewish people, and was renamed in honor of Steinberg.
