= Juvenal Ordóñez =

Peruvian politician

Member of Congress
- In office 26 July 2006 – 7 December 2009
- Constituency: Tacna

Personal details
- Born: 16 May 1948 Tacna, Peru
- Died: 7 December 2009 (aged 61) Lima, Peru
- Party: Peruvian Nationalist Party
- Occupation: Politician

Juvenal Ubaldo Ordóñez Salazar (16 May 1948 – 7 December 2009) was a Peruvian politician and a Congressman representing Tacna for the 2006–2011 term. Ordóñez belonged to the Union for Peru party. He died in office on 7 December 2009.

== Biography ==
Juvenal Ordóñez was born in the city of Tacna, on May 16, 1948. He studied at the Coronel Bolognesi Great Boys' School Unit in his hometown. Later, he obtained the title of secondary teacher in the specialty of Physics-Mathematics at the Champagnat Superior Normal School in Tacna. He studied Social Communication. He served as a secondary education teacher. He was district mayor of Ilabaya, alderman of the Provincial Municipality of Tacna, but above all he was a social fighter.

He participated in the 2006 elections, running for the parliamentary representation of the Tacna Region for the electoral alliance Union for Peru-Peruvian Nationalist Party, being elected with 14,876 preferential votes.
