= Jew Valley =

Valley in Oregon, United States

- Location within Oregon
- Floor elevation: 4,569 ft (1,393 m)

Geography
- Location: United States, Oregon, Lake Country
- Coordinates: 43.29848°N 120.08858°W
- Interactive map of Jew Valley

Jew Valley is a basin in Lake County, Oregon, in the United States.

Jew Valley was named for a colony of Jewish farmers who settled there in the early 20th century.
