= Judas Tree =

Judas Tree is a common name for a flowering tree, Cercis siliquastrum with the common name a reference to the biblical New Testament suicide of Judas Iscariot after betraying the Messiah Jesus Christ in the Land of Judea where the tree species is endemic to.

Judas Tree may also refer to:

- Other flowering tree species in the genus Cercis
- The Judas Tree, a 1961 novel by A. J. Cronin
- The Judas Tree (ballet), by Kenneth MacMillan
- The Judas Tree (Jonathan Creek), an episode of Jonathan Creek
- Ballad of the Judas Tree, (poem) D. Ruth Etchells
