= Socialist Youth Alliance =

Socialist Youth Alliance (in Portuguese: Aliança Socialista da Juventude) was a leftist youth movement in Portugal linked to the Workers Revolutionary Party (PRT). ASJ existed around 1974–1975.
