= St. Jude India =

Non-profit organization

St. Jude India ChildCare Centres
- Founded: April 2006
- Founder: Shyama Kaviratne & Nihal Kaviratne
- Type: Section 8 Company under MCA, Govt of India
- Purpose: Free accommodation and holistic support for under-privileged children suffering from cancer
- Location: Mumbai, Chennai, Kolkata, Delhi, Jaipur, Hyderabad, Vellore, Varanasi, Guwahati, Vishakhapatnam, Muzaffarpur
- Website: www.stjudechild.org

St. Jude India ChildCare Centres (also known as St. Judes) is a non-profit organization in India. St Judes India provides free-of-charge shelter and holistic care to children who are undergoing cancer treatment along with their families. It is a Section 8 non-profit company supported by individuals, corporate houses, and charity trusts.

Founded in 2006 by Nihal and Shyama Kaviratne, St. Judes has 68 centers located in Mumbai, Navi Mumbai , Kolkata, Guwahati, Delhi, Jaipur, Vellore, Chennai, Varanasi, Vishakhapatnam, Muzaffarpur, Bengaluru, and Hyderabad. The free-of-cost accommodation and holistic care includes an infection-free environment conducive to the child's recovery, educational and recreational services for the children and their parents, and counseling services throughout the duration of their treatment.

St. Judes' credo is: "Once a St. Judes child is always a St. Judes child". In keeping with this vision, their new vertical - St. Judes for Life was established in the memory of Mrs. Rani Vicaji, to ensure that these children who are in remission are able to fulfil their potential. They come from underprivileged families who had made great sacrifices to ensure that their children were treated successfully for cancer. To this end, St. Judes for Life continues to provide support to the survivors (also called Judians) as the need arises.

== About St. Judes ==
Parents bring their cancer-affected children from distant villages and towns in India to large cities where they can get medical treatment at minimum or no cost. During the treatment, there are intermittent periods of rest when the child recuperating from chemotherapy treatment must be protected against opportunistic secondary infections resulting from unhygienic conditions and poor-quality food. The unavailability of hygienic shelter, nutritious food, having to travel to and from the hospital, and emotional distress often force the parents to abandon their child's treatment. By providing the child and the parents with an infection-free accommodation and the necessary nutritional and holistic support - all free of cost, St. Judes makes a crucial intervention leading to the child's recovery and a noticeable increase in the survival rates of child patients with cancer.

In addition, St. Judes also addresses the families' educational, recreational, and emotional needs under its care by organizing customized educational programs, celebrations of cultural events, and outings. Transport facilities too are extended to patients for hospital visits. Regular counseling and alternative therapy sessions are held to help the families cope with the stress and trauma that they undergo during the treatment.

Founded by Mr. and Mrs. Kaviratne, the first center for St. Judes was established in Parel, Mumbai. This prototype center had eight individual family units, each accommodating a child patient and its parents. This prototype has now been replicated across the county. In Parel, centers are located close to Tata Memorial Hospital, where most children receive medical treatment. A campus at Cotton Green has also been established in partnership with Mumbai Port Trust (MPT) and Tata Memorial Hospital (TMH), accommodating 165 families close to Tata Memorial Hospital. Centers have also been established in Kharghar, on the campus of the Advanced Centre for Treatment, Research and Education in Cancer (ACTREC); the R&D section of the Tata Memorial Hospital, with a particular center only for patients recuperating from Bone Marrow Transplants.

St. Judes centres are present in 11 cities and support 876 families across 68 centres.

Donations to St. Judes are eligible for tax exemption under Section 80G of the Income Tax Act, 1961.

== About the Founders ==
Nihal Kaviratne CBE: As a result of his 40 years experience working at Unilever, Nihal pursues a keen interest in good corporate governance and corporate social responsibility, developing models for replication by others. He was a founding member of the Board of Governors of President University in Indonesia and one of "25 leaders at the forefront of change" chosen by Business Week in 2002 for the Stars of Asia Award. He was awarded for driving Business Excellence at World Business Conclave 2016 in Hong Kong. Nihal was cited in the Queen's 2004 New Year Honours List in the UK and was awarded the CBE (Commander of the Most Excellent Order of the British Empire) for services to UK business interests and to sustainable development in Indonesia.

In January 2004, he moved from being Chairman of Unilever Indonesia to a regional role in the Unilever Asia Business Group based in Singapore as Senior Vice President - Development & Environmental Affairs. In January 2005, he assumed additional responsibility as Chairman of Unilever's US$2.5 billion Home & Oral Care business in Asia. Today, Nihal is a Director of DBS Group & Bank, DBS Foundation Limited, StarHub, OLAM, GSK Pharma India, and Chairman of Caraway Pte Ltd. He was appointed to the advisory board of Bain & Company for SEA/Indonesia from August 2013, and was appointed a member of the Global Corporate Resilience Advisory Council of McKinsey effective January 2018. He is a member of the Governing Board of Bombay Mothers & Children Welfare Society and a Member of the Private Sector Portfolio Advisory Committee in India of the UK Government's Department for International Development (DFID).

Shyama Kaviratne: She has been associated with social work and charity since childhood. Having completed her studies in management, her 20 years of experience with a nationalised bank have equipped her with the ability to engage with a diverse cross-section of society.

== Awards and honours ==
The Organisation was recently rated 'VO 1A' grading by CRISIL This is the fourth time St. Judes has received this honour.

St. Judes was once again recognised amongst 'India's Top 10 Best NGOs to Work For - 2022'. The recognition comes from Great Place to Work, the global authority in creating, assessing and identifying the best workplaces the world over. The organisation has now received this coveted recognition four times in a row. This year, St. Judes was also recognised amongst the 'Top 50 Mid-Size India's Best Workplaces for Women 2022' by the Great Place to Work Institute.

St. Judes has received GuideStar India Platinum certification for legal & financial compliances and sharing these transparently in the public domain. Also, Platinum Winner 2018 by the GuideStar India NGO Transparency Awards. The organization is also accredited by Credibility Alliance under Desirable Norms.

St. Judes has entered into a Partnership with UTI Mutual Fund, introducing a facility called "CanServe" for investments under UTI Balanced Fund, UTI Spread Fund, and UTI Master share Unit Scheme. "CanServe" will enable investors to contribute their dividend payouts if they are under the dividend payout option or specified amounts as desired, if they are under the growth option, towards St. Judes as a donation for needy and underprivileged children who are being treated for cancer and their families, during the period of the child's treatment.

St. Judes has been honored with the following awards:

- Great Place To Work Certified
- CRISIL Voluntary Organization VO 1A
- GiveIndia Give Assured 5 Stars
- Credibility Alliance Certificate Of Accreditation
- GuideStar India Champion Level - Platinum certification 2019
- Dr. B. Borooah Cancer Institute, Guwahati Award Of Appreciation
- World CSR Congress 2017: Certificate of Merit
- AmeriCares 5th Spirit of Humanity Awards, 2014
- Vocational Service Award for Outstanding Service to Humanity, 2014
- Can India Conclave Certificate for Excellence, 2013
- Qimpro Gold Standard Healthcare Award, 2012
- Marico Innovation for India Awards 2012 In The Social Category, 2012
- Finalists in the Special Category of Vodafone Mobile for Good Awards 2014

== Notes ==
- Cancer in the time of COVID 19
- Telegraph India
- "How a Group of Architects Is Cycling from Bombay to Goa to Raise Awareness about Child Cancer". News18. 27 November 2019.
- Habershon, Alfie (16 October 2019). "Why 4 Of 5 Indian Children Do Not Survive Cancer". IndiaSpend.
- Eclectic Northeast
- Mishra, Ribhu (23 July 2019). "Fighting cancer in children: Providing holistic care to needy young ones and providing education". Financialexpress.
- "World Cancer Survivors' Day: Centre provides patients under treatment free accommodation in big cities". Firstpost. 2 June 2019.
- "Children Suffering from Cancer Now Have a Ray of Hope, Thanks to this Non-Profit Facility". News18. 2 June 2019.
- Telegraph India
- The Asian age
- Adajania, Kayezad E. (26 August 2015). "UTI AMC ties up with cancer support firm to encourage donations". mint.
- Offering holistic care spiceroutemag.com

ToI City Lights 23 March:

- "Tata Medical Center inaugurates 'Premashraya' residential facility for underprivileged cancer patients and relatives". NRI News 24x7. 3 July 2015.
- Times City Kolkata
- Mumbai Mirror
- The Telegraph
- Engineer, Rayomand (14 March 2018). "This Awesome Initiative Is Giving Kids with Cancer All the Support They Need!". The Better India.
- Banerjee, Usha (18 February 2018). "A ray of hope for cancer-stricken kids". DNA India.

Radio ONE, Feb 2018

- Sound Cloud article
