= Ju (Korean given name) =

- Hangul: 주
- RR: Ju
- MR: Chu
- IPA: [tɕu]

Ju (Korean: 주), also spelled Joo or Chu, is a Korean given name. Notable people with the name include:

- Wang Chu, personal name of King Gyeongjong of Goryeo
- Yoon Joo (born 1989), South Korean actress

== See also ==
- List of Korean given names
