= Juden Creek =

Stream in the American state of Missouri

Juden Creek is a stream in Cape Girardeau County in the U.S. state of Missouri, named for John Juden, an early settler. It is a tributary of the Mississippi River. Its headwaters arise at 37°23′07″N 89°32′43″W and flow south, then southeast, passing the north side of Cape Girardeau and entering the Mississippi northeastward, at 37°20′03″N 89°29′31″W.

== See also ==
- List of rivers of Missouri
