= St. Jude's Cathedral =

St. Jude's Cathedral may refer to:

- St. Jude's Cathedral (Iqaluit), Canada
- Cathedral of Saint Jude the Apostle (St. Petersburg, Florida), United States
