= Yahud =

Yahud may refer to:

- Yehud (יהוד), Yehudi (יהודי), and Yehudim (יהודים), the Hebrew word for Jews
- Yahud or Yahudy (يهود), the Arabic word for Jews
- Yehud (יהוד), a city in Israel located near the Ben Gurion Airport
- Yehud Medinata, the Levantine province of the Achaemenid Persian Empire

== See also ==
- Yehudi (disambiguation)
- Yahudi, a 1958 Indian film
