= Sexual abuse scandal in the Roman Catholic Archdiocese of Cardiff =

Sexual abuse cases in the United Kingdom

The sexual abuse scandal in Cardiff archdiocese is a significant episode in the series of Catholic sex abuse cases that occurred throughout various Western countries.

== John Lloyd affair ==
In 1998, Father John Lloyd, a parish priest and Bishop John Aloysius Ward's former press secretary, was imprisoned for sexual offences involving children. Prior to his arrest parents had written letters to Ward to complain of Lloyd's behaviour, but these were handed over to Lloyd. Lloyd was vocal about this, brandishing the letters at the altar and naming who they were written by. Telling parishioners there was no point writing them as they would all be handed over to him. As a result parishioners stopped complaining.

The 1998 charges brought against Lloyd included 4 charges of rape and 17 offences of indecent assault on six children who were aged between 8 and 13 at the time of the incidents. When interviewed by the police Lloyd denied the allegations, and claimed had always been "a very touchy person". One witness in court was a 36-year-old woman who accused Lloyd of raping her more than 20 times at her school, in the confessional box. She was aged 9 at the time and said the assaults occurred over an 18-month period. Another witness told the court that Lloyd would put his hand inside her school uniform and had groped her. An ex-altar boy also testified about his experiences, where Lloyd had assaulted him in the vestry. One woman spoke about how Lloyd had baptised her in his church, before assaulting her, then driving her home. Lloyd denied all the charges. He ultimately convicted of a single indecency offence and sentenced to an 8-year jail sentence.

In October 1999 Lloyd was dismissed by papal decree by Pope John Paul II. This meant Lloyd was no longer able to conduct any church services, or teach in any catholic school or college. Ward later confirmed that he had requested the dismissal from the Pope, meaning there was no need for a canonical trial.

== Joseph Jordan affair ==
In October 2000, Joseph Jordan was imprisoned for indecent assaults on boys, and for downloading child pornography from the Internet.

Jordan had been ordained by Ward in 1998, despite Ward being warned about Jordan's behaviour in 1995 by Christopher Budd, Bishop of Plymouth, under whom Lloyd started his training for the priesthood. Jordan had previously been charged with indecently assaulting a boy but was acquitted in 1990. Despite this Budd accepted his application to become a Roman Catholic priest in 1991. Budd later reflected that he regretted approving Jordan's application, leading him to warn Ward about him.

Jordan was ultimately sentenced to eight years in prison by Cardiff Crown Court. This sentence was made up of two cases, with four and a half years being connected to an indecent assault of two nine-year-old boys, attempting to pervert the cause of justice and possessing child pornography. In the other case, Jordan was sentenced three and a half years for crimes he committed during his time as a teacher in Surrey and Yorkshire. He was found guilty of six charges of indecent assault on a 12-year-old boy that occurred between 1987-1989.

A BBC Panorama investigation was aired in November 2000 and accused Ward of failing to take action. Ward requested that the Pope appoint a new bishop to serve alongside him, who would then succeed him.

== John Aloysius Ward ==
Archbishop of Cardiff, John Aloysius Ward went on sick leave after he fell ill with deep vein thrombosis in December 2000. Bishop of Wrexham Edwin Regan was appointed to deputise for him. The Catholic Herald defended Ward, but The Tablet called for his retirement. After a period of recuperation, he said he was ready to return to his office. Ward was interviewed by Pope John Paul II, and resigned shortly afterwards, on 26 October 2001. He insisted his resignation was related to his poor health. He was replaced as Archbishop by Peter Smith.

== Posthumous allegations against Ward ==
According to the Times March 28, 2007 (the day after Archbishop Ward's death):

The nightmare had begun in January 1999, when a woman claimed that he [Ward] had raped her with a crucifix on the altar of his London parish church in the 1960s. Her story, deemed improbable by four police stations in Britain and Ireland, was finally accepted by a fifth. The allegation was reported in a tabloid newspaper before the police had even approached the archbishop. He was later arrested, but released without charge.
