= Wrexham Deanery =

Catholic deanery in Wales

The Wrexham Deanery is a Roman Catholic deanery in the Diocese of Wrexham that covers several churches in Wrexham and Powys.

The dean is based at the Parish of St Mary the Virgin in Ruabon.

== Churches ==
- Wrexham Cathedral, Wrexham
- Holy Family, Coedpoeth – served from Wrexham Cathedral
- St Anne, Wrexham
- St Mary the Virgin (Church in Wales), Ruabon
- Holy Cross (Y Groes), Llangollen – served from Ruabon
- Sacred Heart, Chirk – served from Ruabon
- St Francis of Assisi, Llay
- Christ the King, Rossett – served from Llay
- God the Holy Ghost, Newtown
- Our Lady and St Richard Gwyn, Llanidloes – served from Newtown
- St Winefride, Welshpool
- St Garmon (Church in Wales), Llanfechain – served from Welshpool
- Our Lady and the Welsh Martyrs, Overton

== Gallery ==
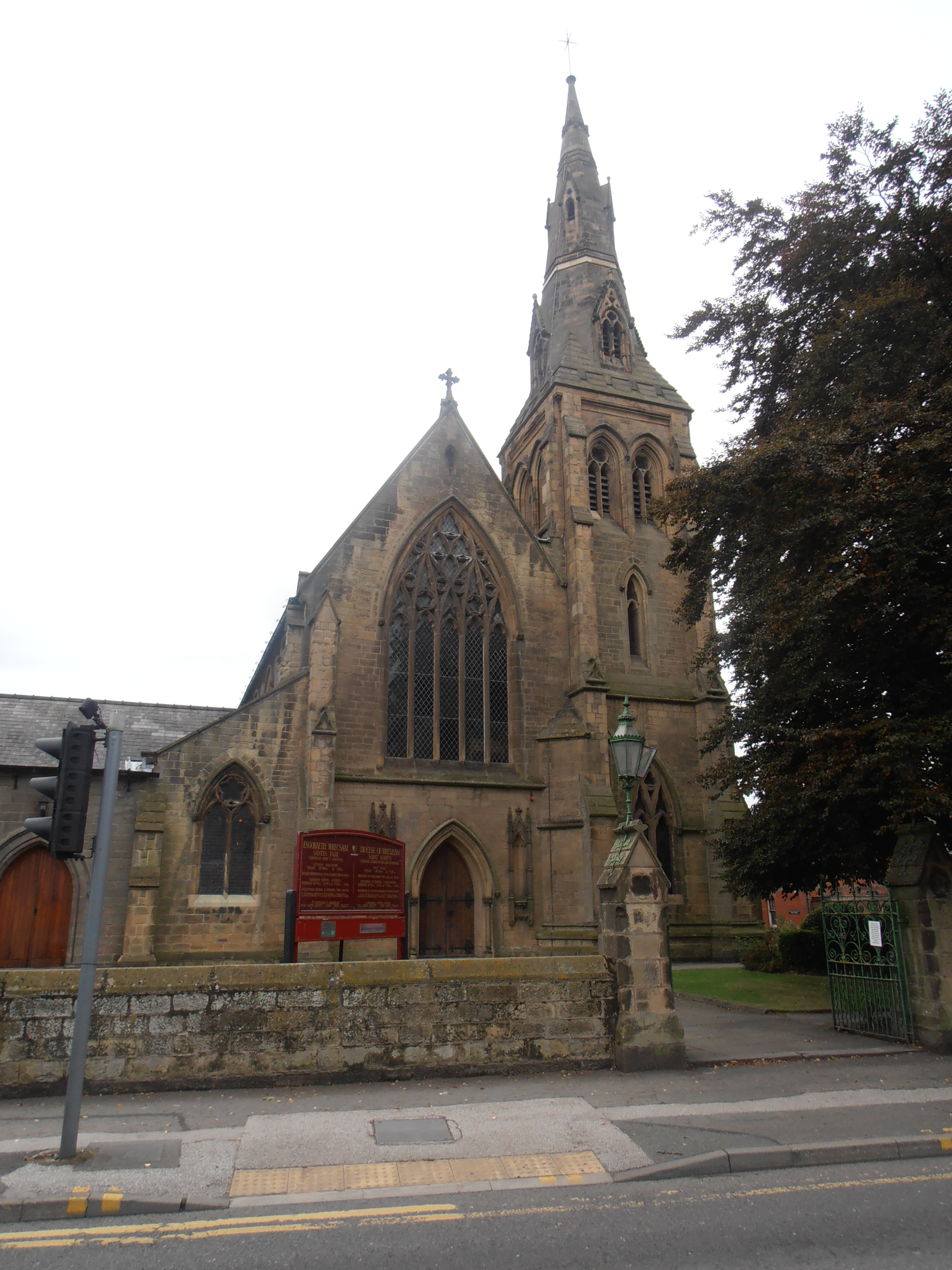
Wrexham Cathedral

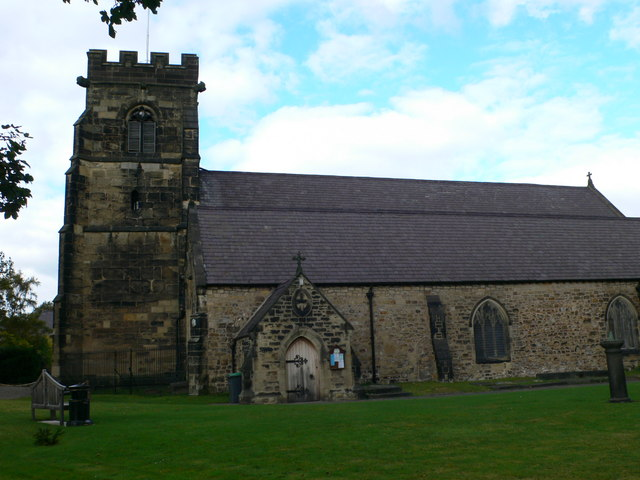
St Mary the Virgin (Church in Wales), Ruabon

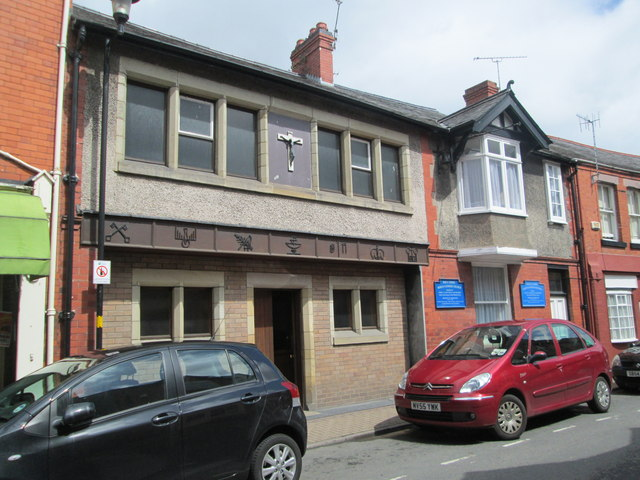
Holy Cross, Llangollen

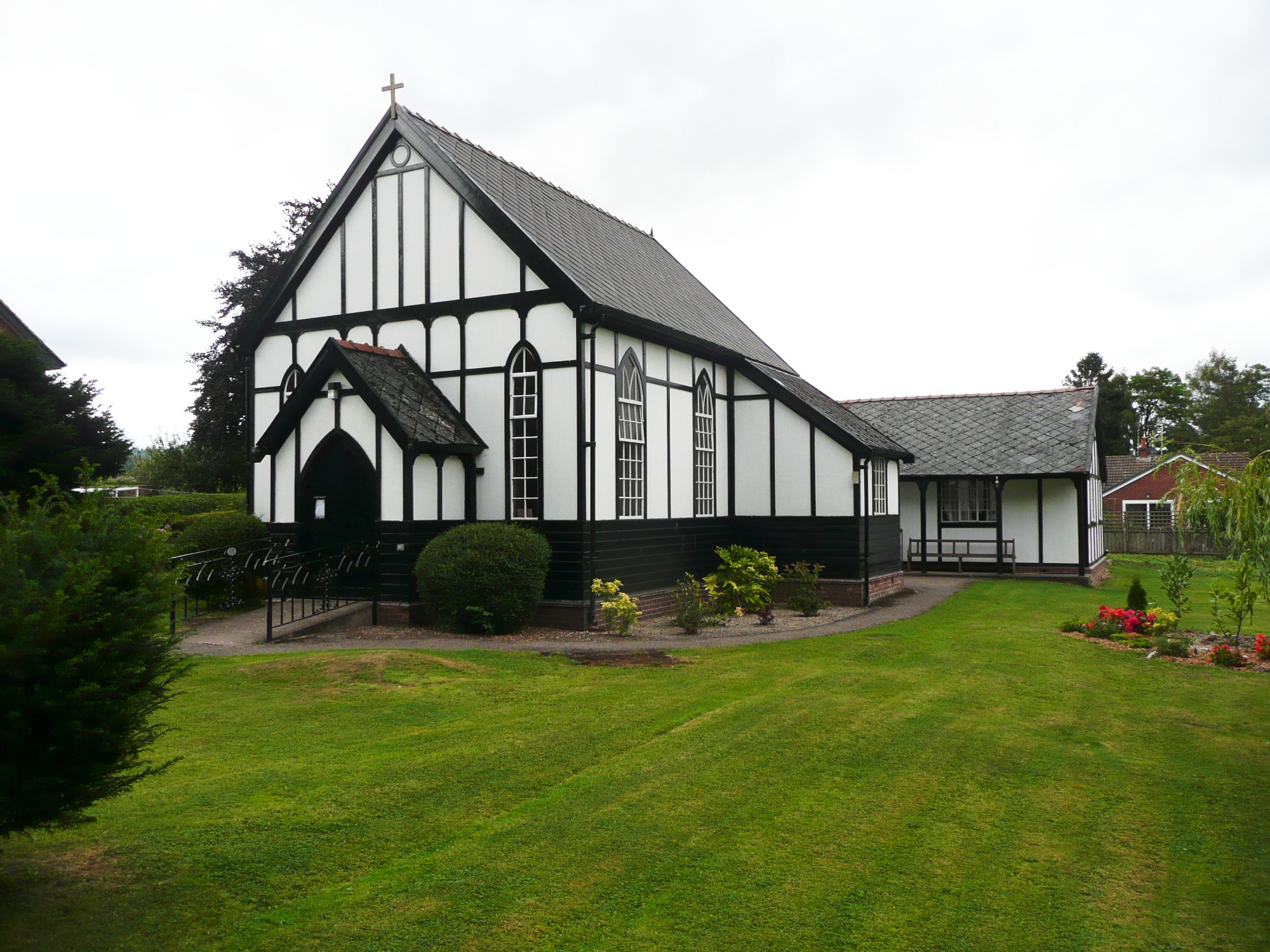
Sacred Heart, Chirk

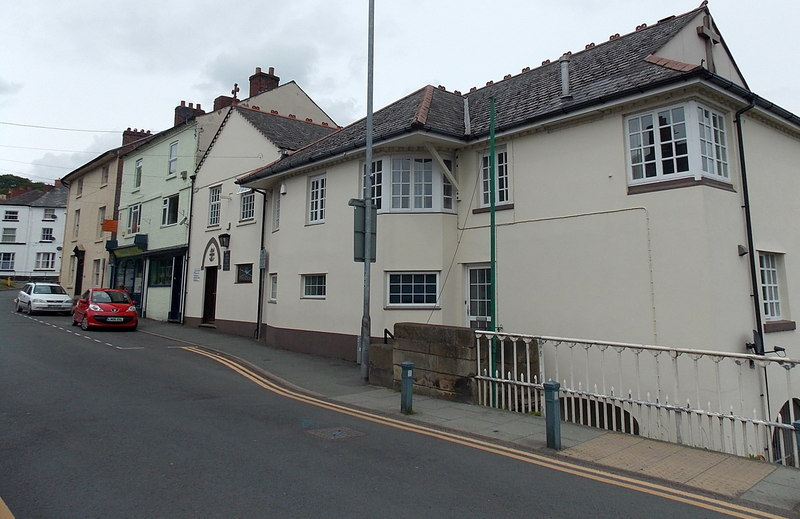
God the Holy Ghost, Newtown

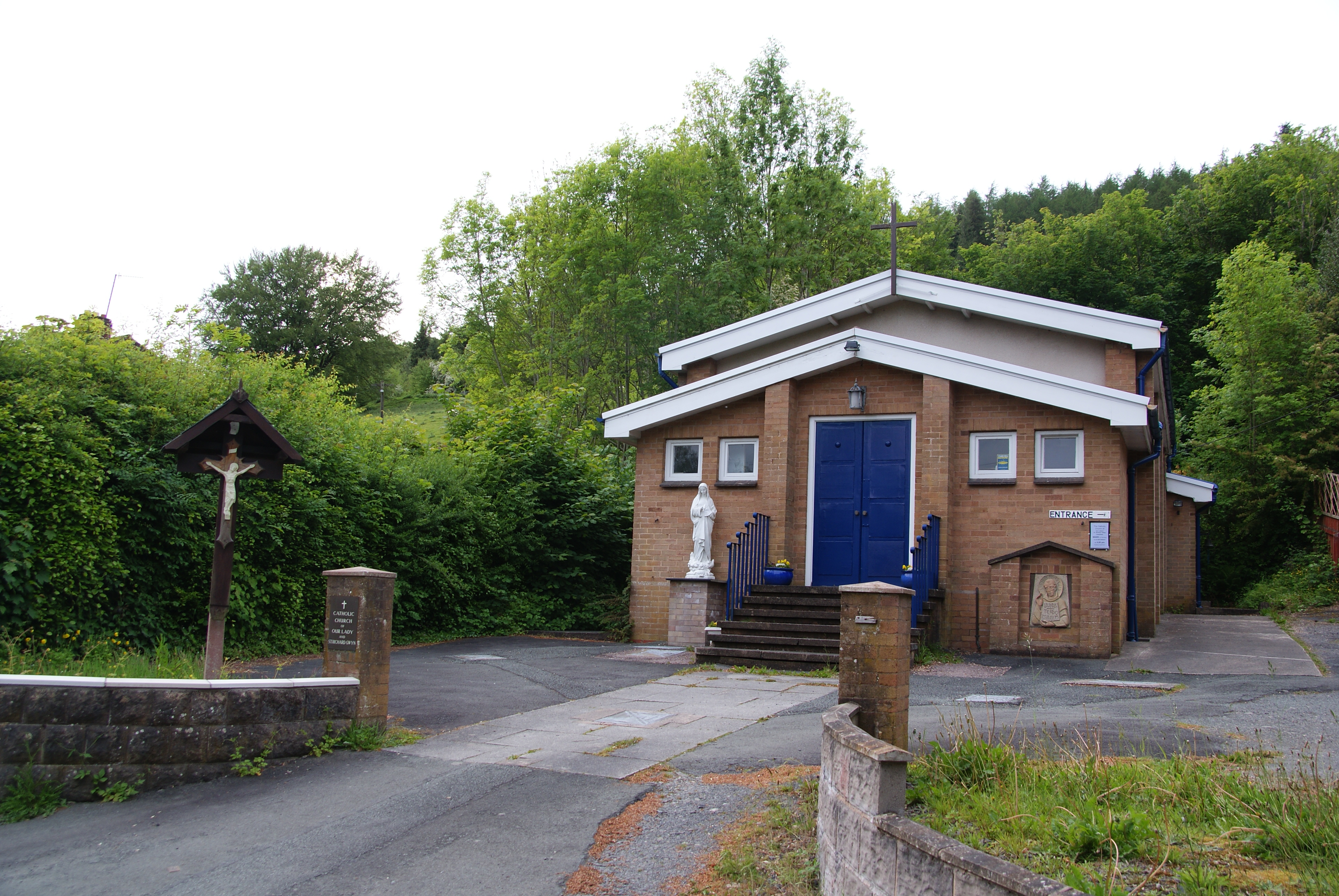
Our Lady and St Richard Gwyn, Llanidloes

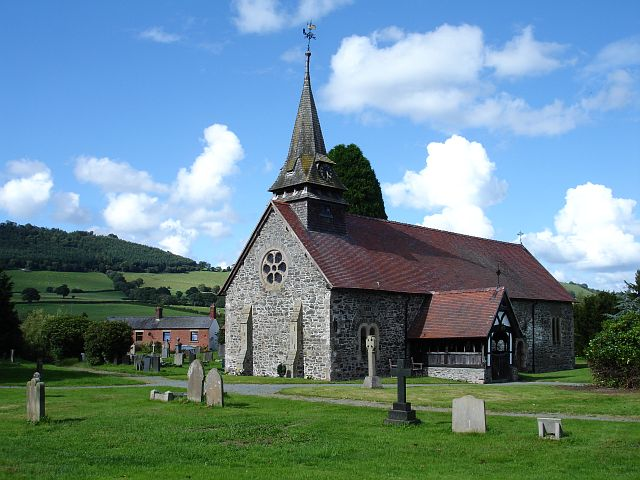
St Garmon (Church in Wales), Llanfechain
