= John Ward (archbishop of Cardiff) =

British Catholic prelate

The Most Reverend John Ward OFM Cap
- Archbishop of Cardiff
- Church: Latin Church
- Archdiocese: Cardiff
- Province: Cardiff
- Appointed: 25 March 1983
- Term ended: 26 October 2001
- Predecessor: John Murphy
- Successor: Peter Smith
- Other posts: Archbishop Emeritus of Cardiff (2001–2007); Bishop of Menevia (1981–1983)

Orders
- Ordination: 7 June 1953
- Consecration: 1 October 1980 by Langton Fox

Personal details
- Born: John Aloysius Ward; 24 January 1929 Leeds, England
- Died: 27 March 2007 (aged 78) Ystradowen, Wales
- Denomination: Roman Catholic

John Aloysius Ward OFM Cap (24 January 1929 – 27 March 2007) was a British Roman Catholic prelate. He served as Bishop of Menevia from 1 October 1980 until his appointment by Pope John Paul II as Metropolitan Archbishop of Cardiff on 25 March 1983. He served as archbishop until his retirement on 26 October 2001.

== Biography ==
=== Early life ===
John Aloysius Ward was born in Leeds on 24 January 1929, the son of Eugene and Hannah Ward. The Ward family later moved to Wrexham, North Wales, where the young John Ward was brought up. He was educated at St. Mary's Primary School, Wrexham, and at Prior Park College, Bath. He subsequently joined the novitiate of the Order of Friars Minor Capuchin whom he had known from their house at Pantasaph, North Wales.

=== Ministry ===
Once he had completed his novitiate, and his priestly studies, he was ordained to the sacred priesthood at the Franciscan Parish in Peckham in 1953. He returned to reside at Pantasaph. Fr. Ward was then appointed to be in charge of the Diocese of Menevia's travelling mission. He was appointed Parish Priest of Peckham and also Guardian of the Franciscan Friary there. In 1969 Fr. Ward was appointed Minister Provincial for the Capuchins of Great Britain. In 1970 he was appointed as an adviser to the Father General of the Capuchin Order in Rome. In this responsibility he looked after the spiritual needs of English-speaking Capuchins throughout the world. He travelled widely, going on many visitations and missions, to places such as Africa and Southeast Asia.

=== Episcopate ===
Pope John Paul II named him as Coadjutor Bishop of Menevia on 1 October 1980. He succeeded Bishop Langton Fox in February 1982. A short time later, on 25 March 1983, he was named Archbishop of Cardiff.

Especially in his early years as archbishop, he sought very successfully priestly vocations, and a good number were ordained by him during his tenure. Archbishop Ward was very prominent during the miners' strike; he went to London to meet with the Secretary of State for Energy. He also made a prominent response to the famine in Ethiopia which led to an appeal that raised a substantial sum of over £100,000; it culminated in a large attendance at Mass in Cardiff Arms Park on 6 June 1985.

Archbishop Ward also called together a Diocesan Pastoral Congress, laying down the foundations for the renewal of structures within the Archdiocese of Cardiff. He was a very strong and active supporter of ecumenism, and became the first Catholic Bishop to address the General Synod of the Church in England. He attended the 1994 Synod of Bishops in Rome on behalf of the Bishops' Conference of England and Wales.

He won the support of Cardiff Catholics when, in 1996, he resisted an offer by the millionaire, Sir Julian Hodge, to build a new cathedral for Cardiff at a cost of £3 million, in the heart of the city. Ward was aware of the attachment felt by Cardiff Catholics to the existing cathedral, and maintained that it was adequate.

=== Retirement ===
Archbishop Ward was dismissed by the Pope on 26 October 2001. He retired to a bungalow where he displayed his archiepiscopal coat of arms over his front door. He remained active during his retirement, celebrating the Golden Jubilee of his priestly ordination at St. Mary's, Bridgend, on 7 June 2003.

He died on Tuesday 27 March 2007. His Funeral Mass, celebrated by Archbishop Peter Smith, took place on Monday 2 April 2007, at St. David's Metropolitan Cathedral, Cardiff.

=== Abuse scandal ===
In 1998, Father John Lloyd, a parish priest and Bishop John Aloysius Ward's former press secretary, was imprisoned for sexual offences involving children. Parents had written letters to Ward to complain of Lloyd's behaviour: he reportedly passed the letters on to Lloyd. In 1999, the Archbishop suffered what was described at the time as a personal nightmare, when a woman claimed that he had assaulted her while parish priest in Peckham. This allegation was reported in The News of the World tabloid newspaper before the Police had conferred with the Archbishop. He was later arrested, but released without any charge.

In October 2000, Joseph Jordan was imprisoned for indecent assaults on boys. Jordan had been ordained by Ward in 1998, despite Ward being warned about Jordan's behaviour by Christopher Budd, Bishop of Plymouth, under whom Lloyd started his training for the priesthood. The day after giving an interview to the BBC programme Panorama about Jordan, he was taken to the hospital suffering from a blood clot. After a period in which Edwin Regan, Bishop of Wrexham, served as Apostolic Administrator, there was a period when the Archbishop claimed he would return to his duties once he was fully restored to health. However, following an audience with Pope John Paul, the Archbishop announced his intention to retire.

Catholic Church titles
Preceded by Langton Fox	Bishop of Menevia; 1981–1983	Succeeded by James Hannigan
Preceded by John Murphy	Archbishop of Cardiff; 1983–2001	Succeeded by Peter Smith
