= St Tudwal's Church, Barmouth =

Catholic church in Gwynedd, Wales

St Tudwal's Church
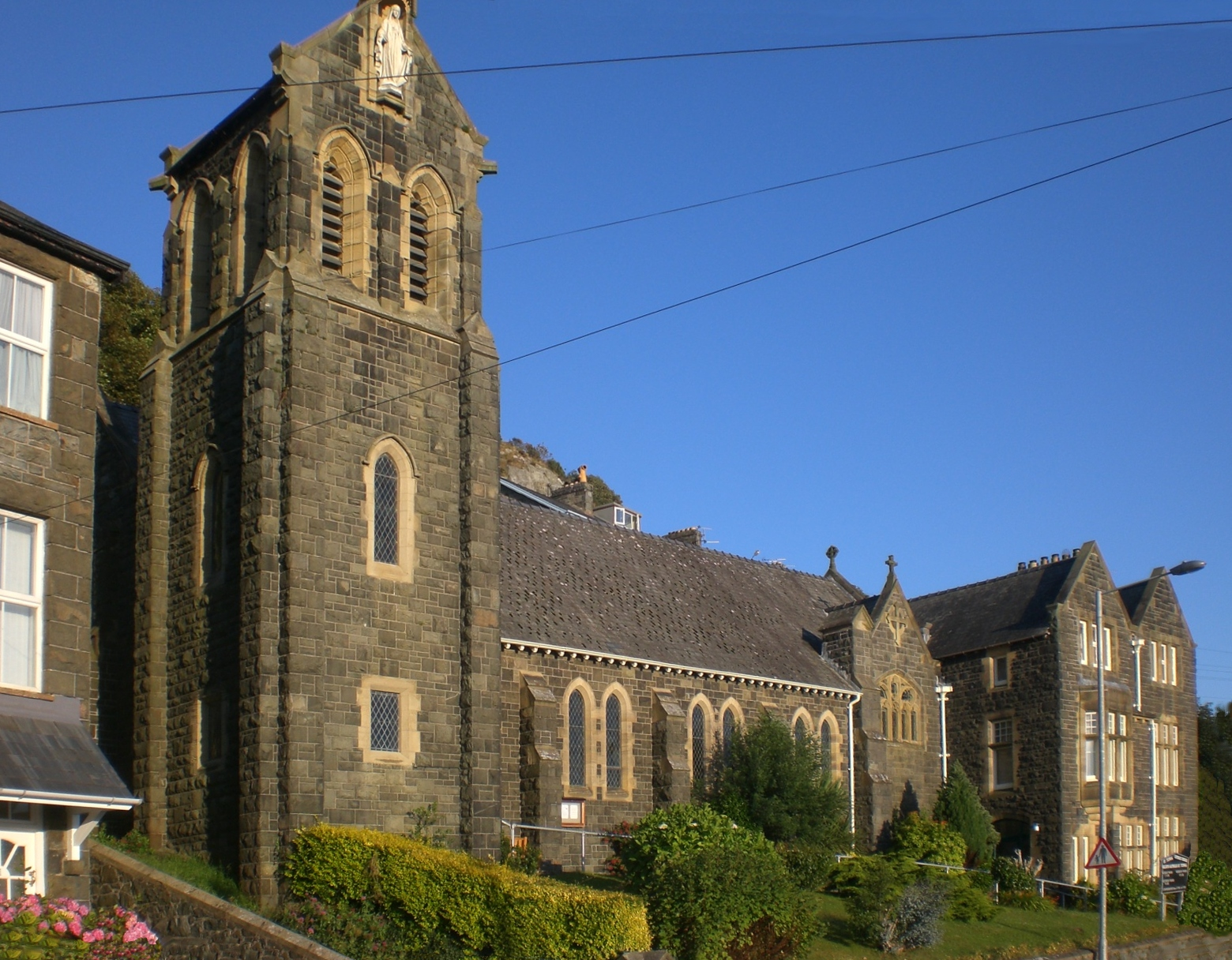
- West side of the church
- St Tudwal's Church
- 52.725474°N 4.057217°W
- Location: Barmouth, Gwynedd
- Country: Wales
- Denomination: Catholic Church
- Sui iuris church: Latin Church
- Churchmanship: Roman Rite
- Website: WrexhamDiocese.org.uk

History
- Status: Active
- Founder: Fr C. B. Wilcock
- Dedication: Tudwal
- Consecrated: August 1908

Architecture
- Functional status: Parish church
- Groundbreaking: 15 August 1904
- Completed: 1905

Administration
- Province: Cardiff
- Diocese: Wrexham
- Deanery: Dolgellau

St Tudwal's Church is a Catholic parish church in Barmouth, Gwynedd. It is situated on the King Edward Road leading from Barmouth to Llanaber. It was built in 1905 and is in the Dolgellau Deanery of the Diocese of Wrexham.

== History ==
=== Origin ===
Catholic worship started in Barmouth in 1890. A Fr. Donovan held services in the rooms of local houses until a small church was erected on Park Road. This was opened on 11 September 1891, on the very day that the steeple of the nearby St John's Church fell down. At the time, even though over forty years had elapsed since the re-establishment of the English and Welsh hierarchy, Wales had very few Catholics and the Catholic churches in the north of Wales came under the administration of the Diocese of Shrewsbury. In 1895, they came under the Vicariate Apostolic of Wales, then in 1898 it became the Diocese of Menevia. St Tudwal's was one of the few Catholic churches in the north of Wales at this time. It was created and persisted during this time of flux for Catholics in north Wales.

=== Construction ===
In the 1900s, a new priest arrived, Fr. C. B. Wilcock from St Helens, Merseyside. He worked to have a new, larger, church built to accommodate the increasing size of the local congregation. The church was completed in 1905 and was opened by the first Bishop of Menevia, Francis Mostyn. The inscription on the foundation-stone, translated from Latin reads:

In the year of Our Lord Incarnate the fifteenth of August 1904. On the Feast of the Assumption of the Holy Mother of God, the Virgin Mary, our Lord Francis, by the grace of God and the Apostolic See, Bishop of Menevia, laid this first stone in the honour of the same glorious Virgin Mary and Saint Tudwal.

=== Anniversary ===
On 1 September 1939, it was reported in the Catholic Herald that the church celebrated the 31st anniversary of its consecration. The priest at the time was Fr. Patrick Collins. He organised a Mass to be said in memory of the church's founder Fr Wilcock. A choir from De La Salle College in Fr Wilcock's home parish of the Church of St Mary, Lowe House in St Helens were on holiday in nearby Dyffryn Ardudwy and came to sing at the Mass.

== Parish ==
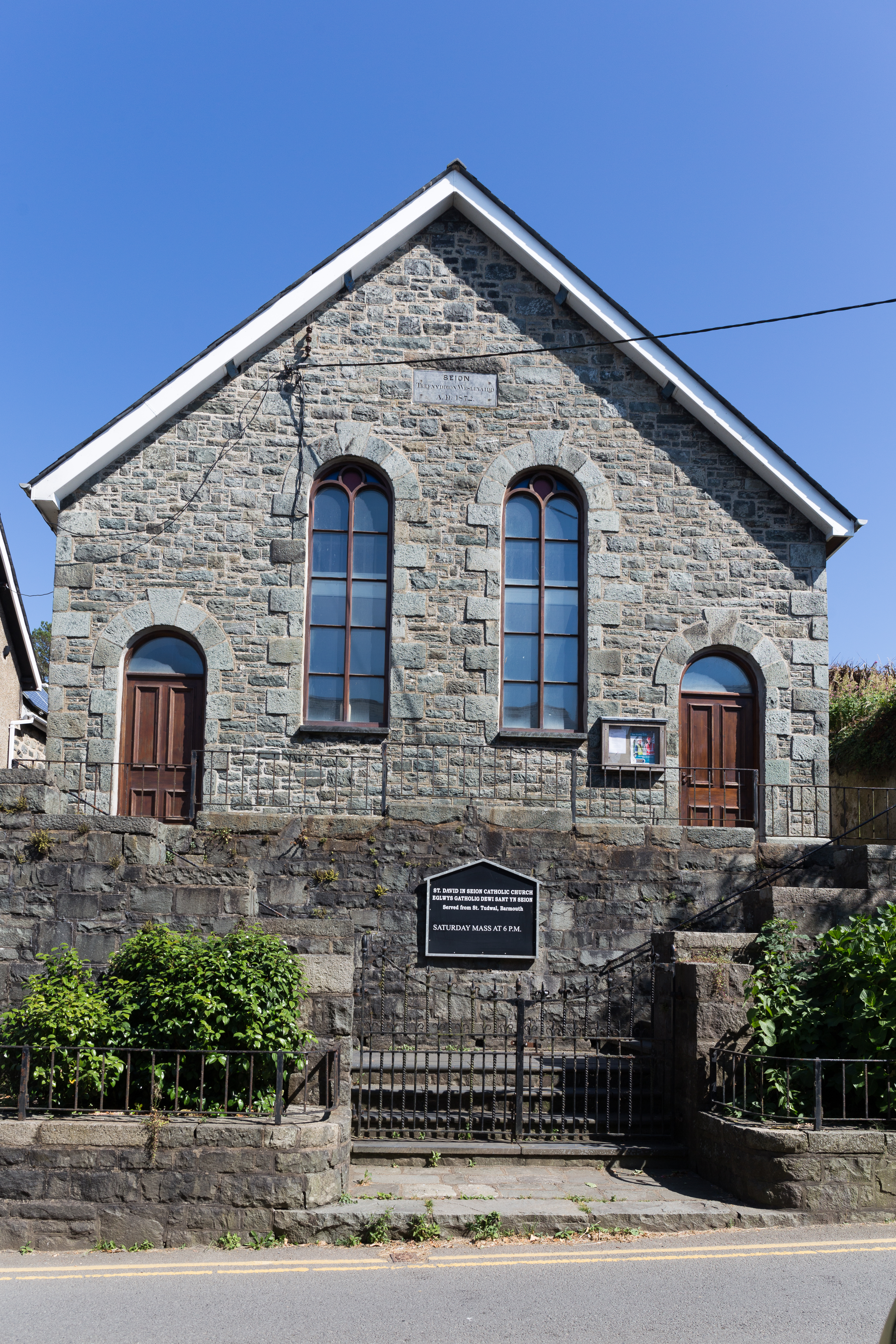
St David in Seion Church in Harlech

The parish also contains St David in Seion Church in Harlech. St David's church was built in 1814 as a Seion Wesleyan Methodist chapel, re-built in 1872 and was purchased and converted for Catholic use in 1998.

St David's Church in Harlech has a Sunday morning Mass at 9:00am and St Tudwal's church has a Sunday Mass at 11:00am.

== Gallery ==
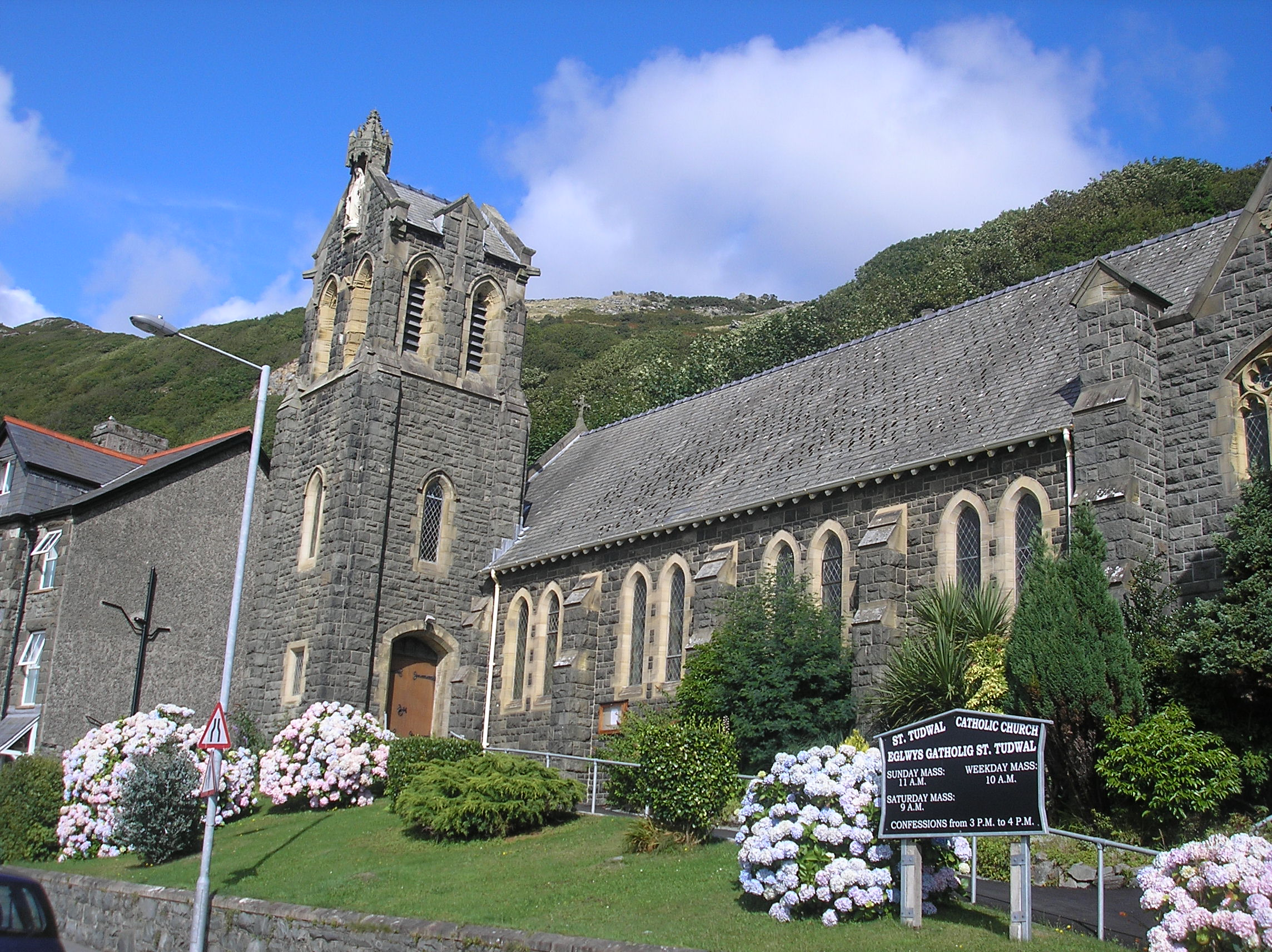
View from road

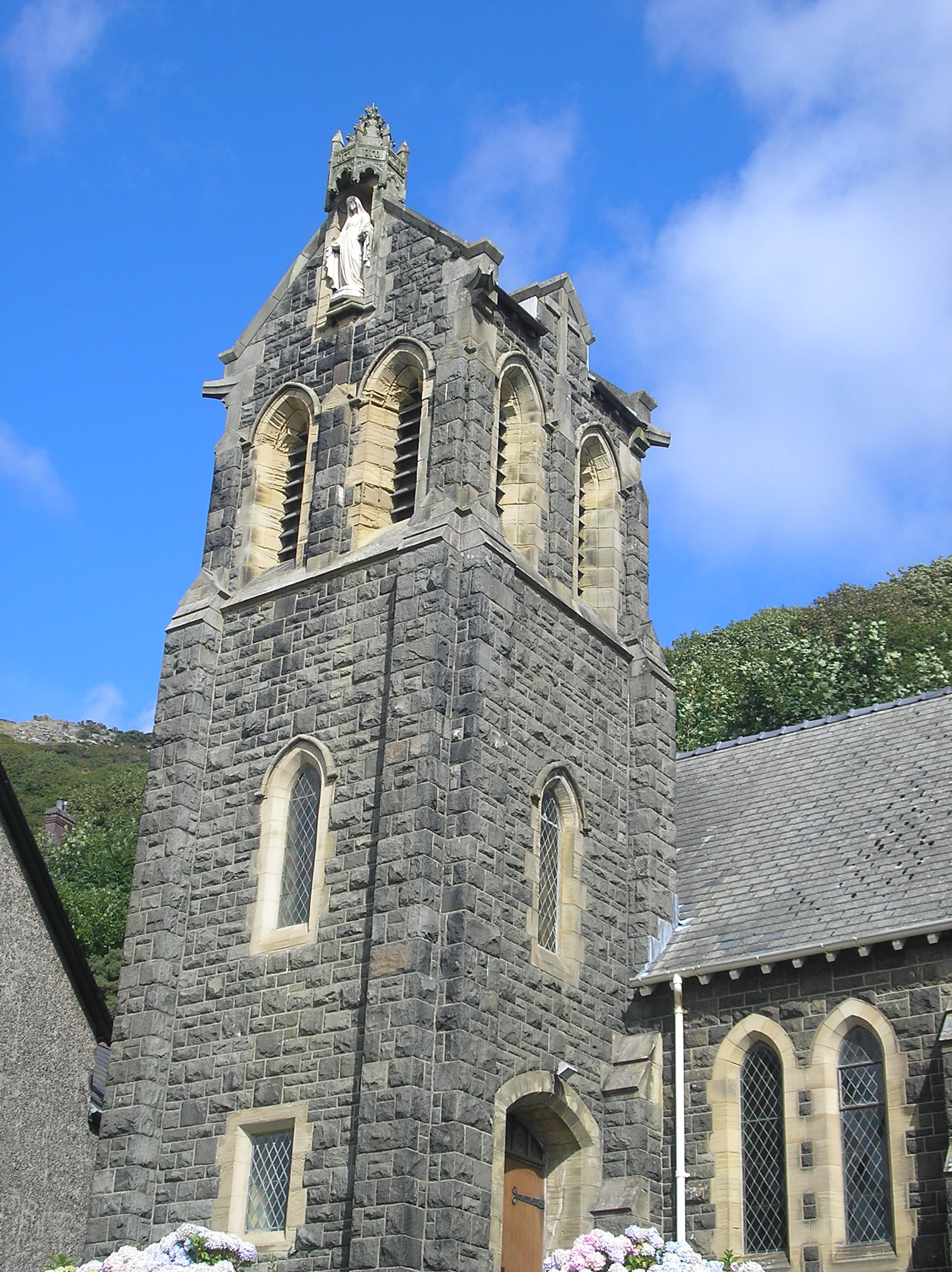
Tower

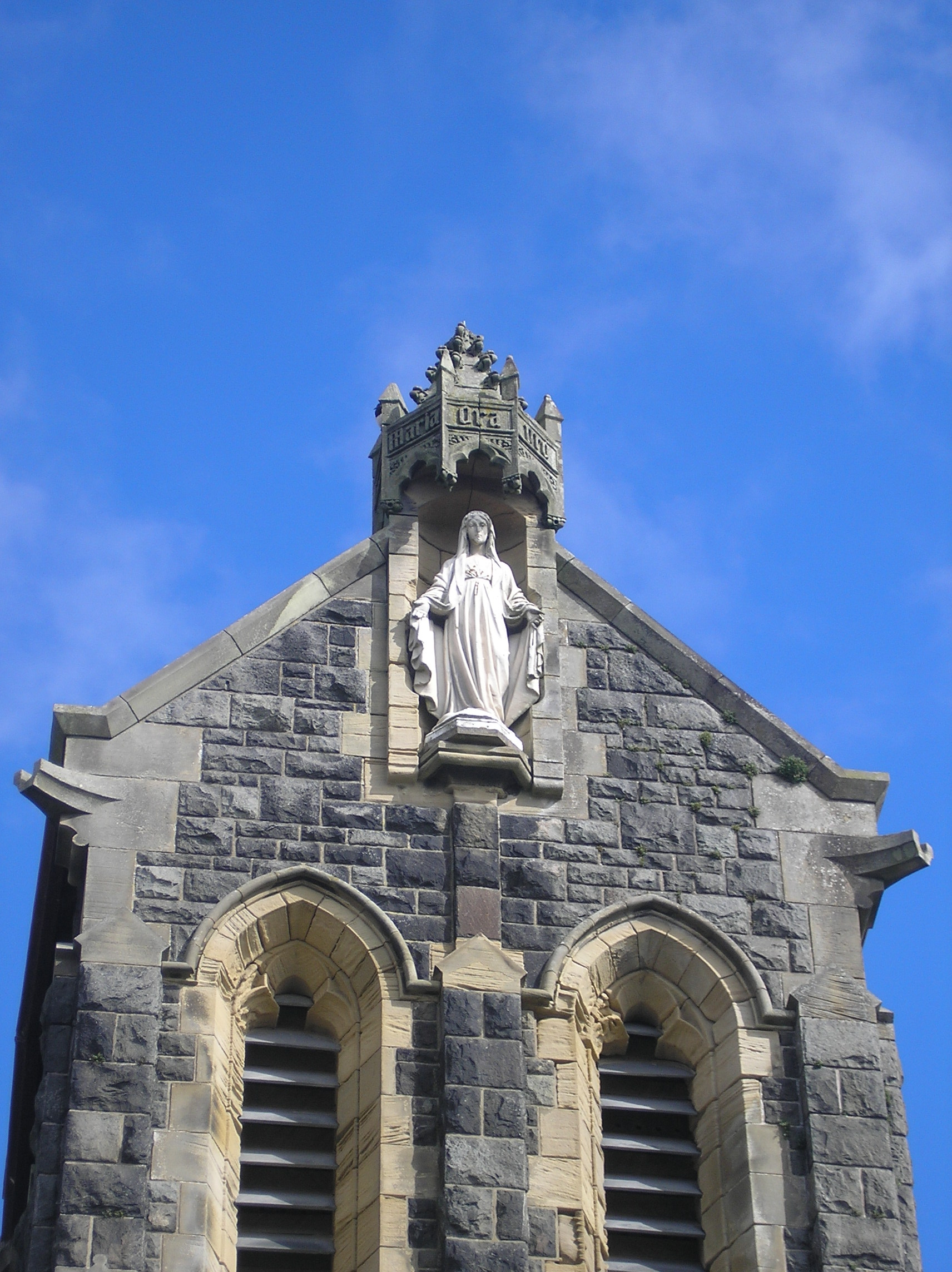
Statue of St Mary in tower

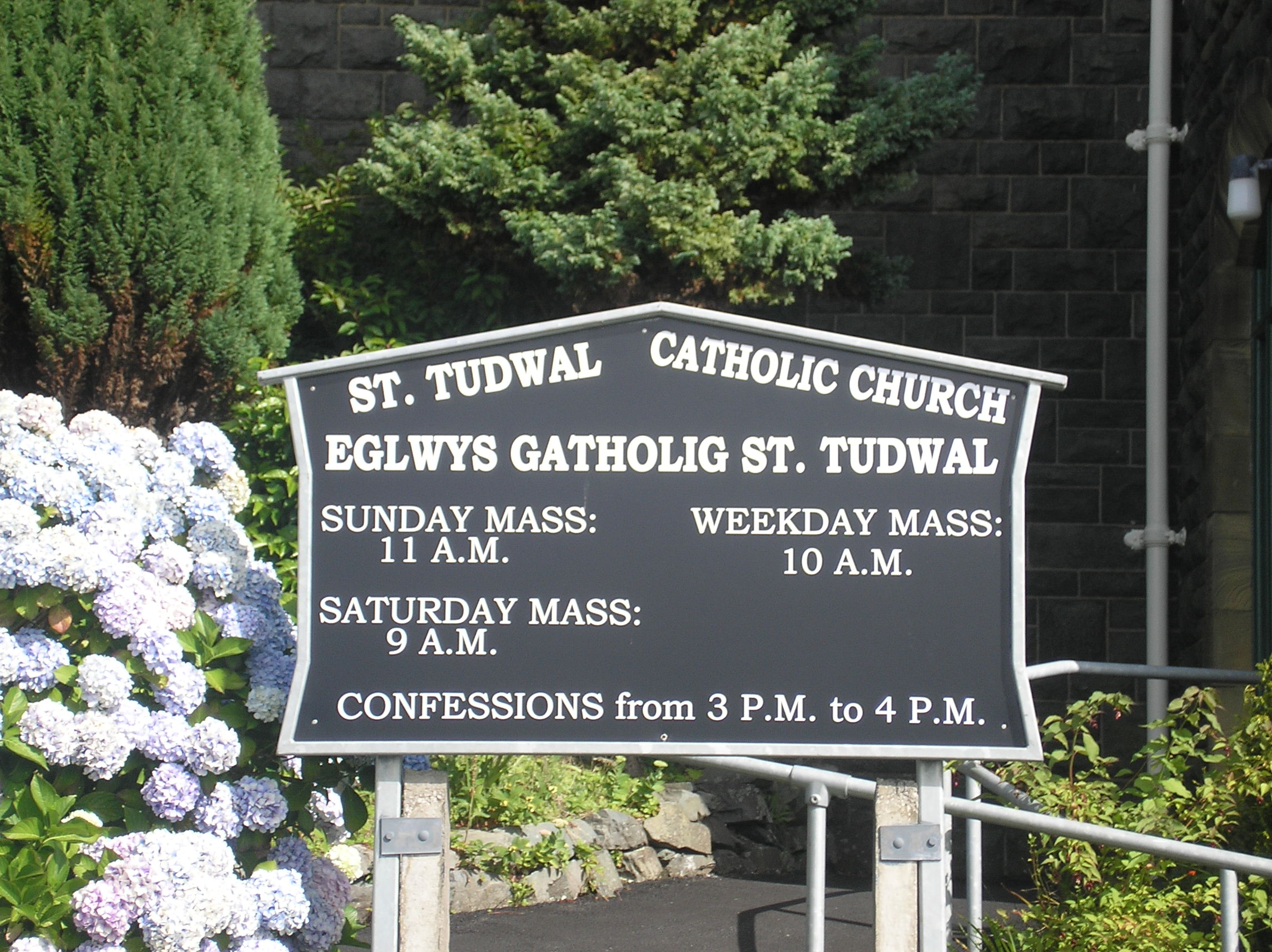
Church sign

== See also ==
- Diocese of Wrexham
- Barmouth
