= Dolgellau Deanery =

The Dolgellau Deanery is a Roman Catholic deanery in the Diocese of Wrexham that covers several churches in Gwynedd.

The dean is centred at Our Lady of Sorrows, Dolgellau.

== Churches ==
- St Tudwal's Church, Barmouth
- St David in Seion, Harlech – served from Barmouth
- St Mary Magdalene, Blaenau Ffestiniog
- Holy Cross, Gellilydan – served from Blaenau Ffestiniog
- Our Lady of Seven Sorrows, Dolgellau
- Our Lady of Fatima, Bala – served from Dolgellau
- The Most Holy Redeemer, Porthmadog
- The Holy Spirit, Criccieth – served from Porthmadog
- St Mary (Church in Wales), Beddgelert – served from Porthmadog
- St David's Church, Tywyn
- Christ the King, Aberdyfi – Closed August 2016
- St Mair (Our Lady Help of Christians), Machynlleth – served from Tywyn

== Gallery ==
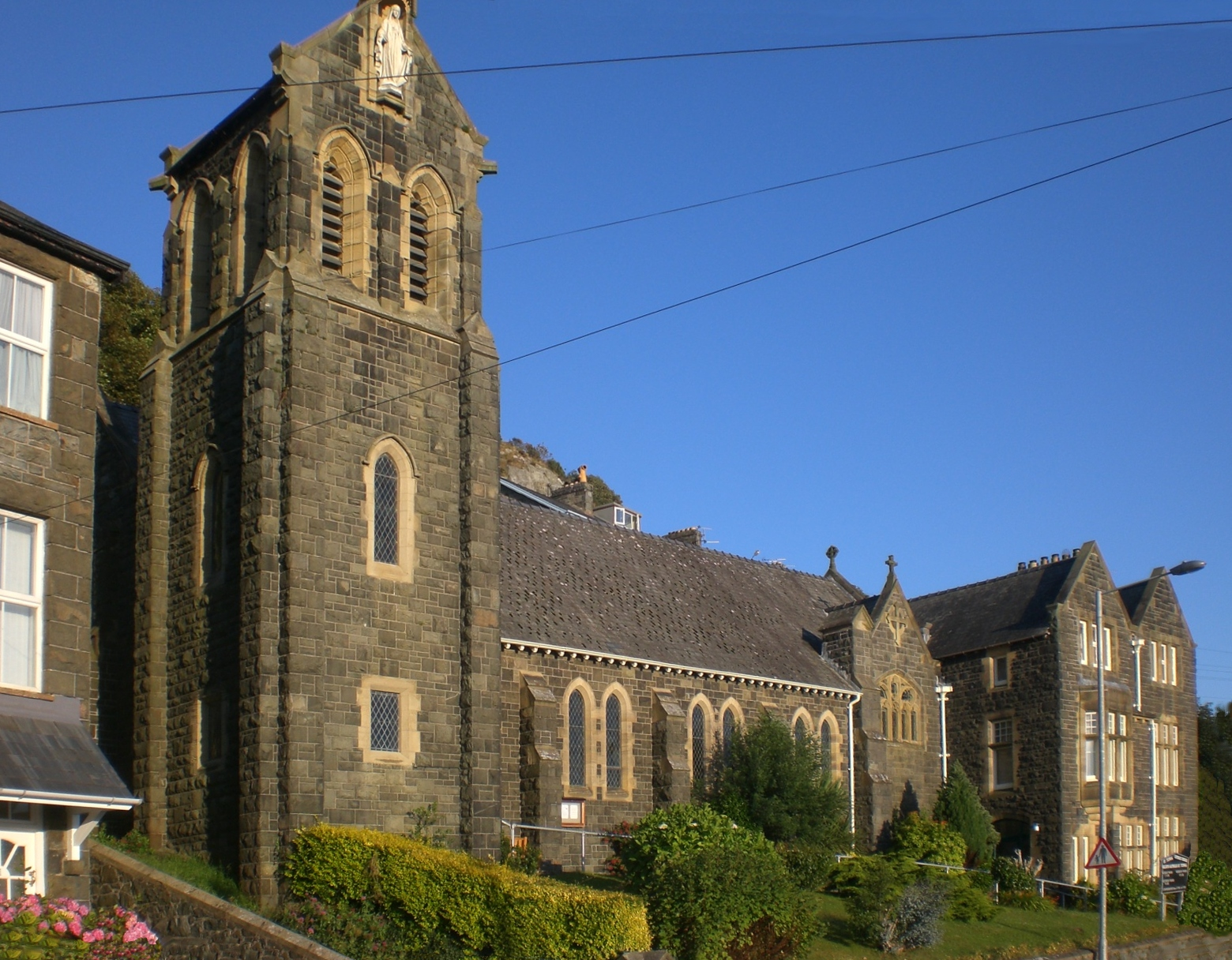
St Tudwal's Church, Barmouth

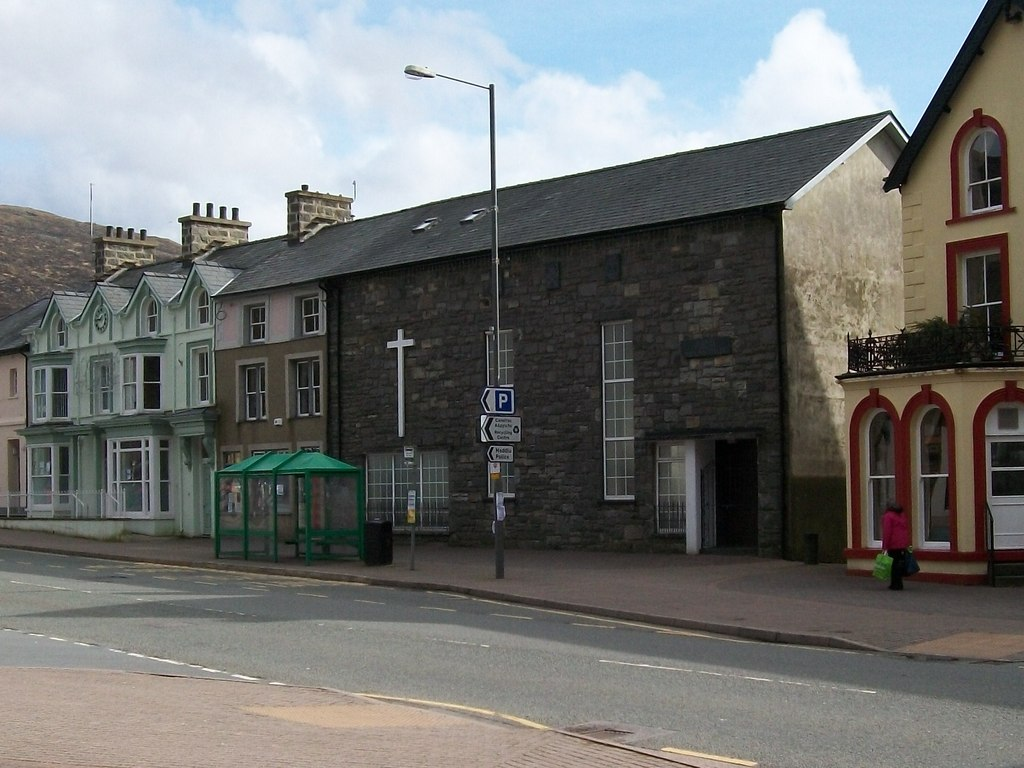
St Mary Magdalene, Blaenau Ffestiniog

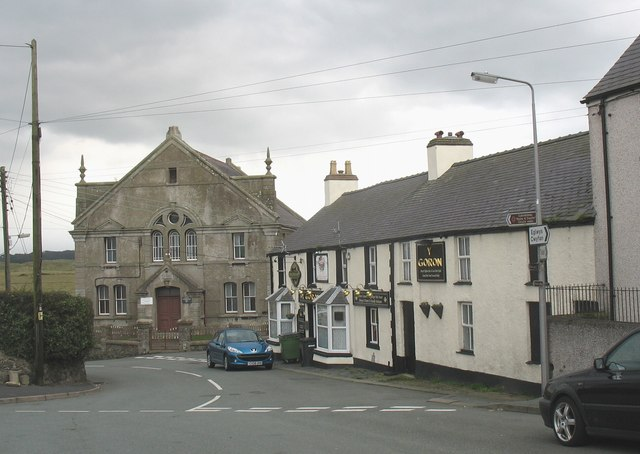
St David in Seion, Harlech

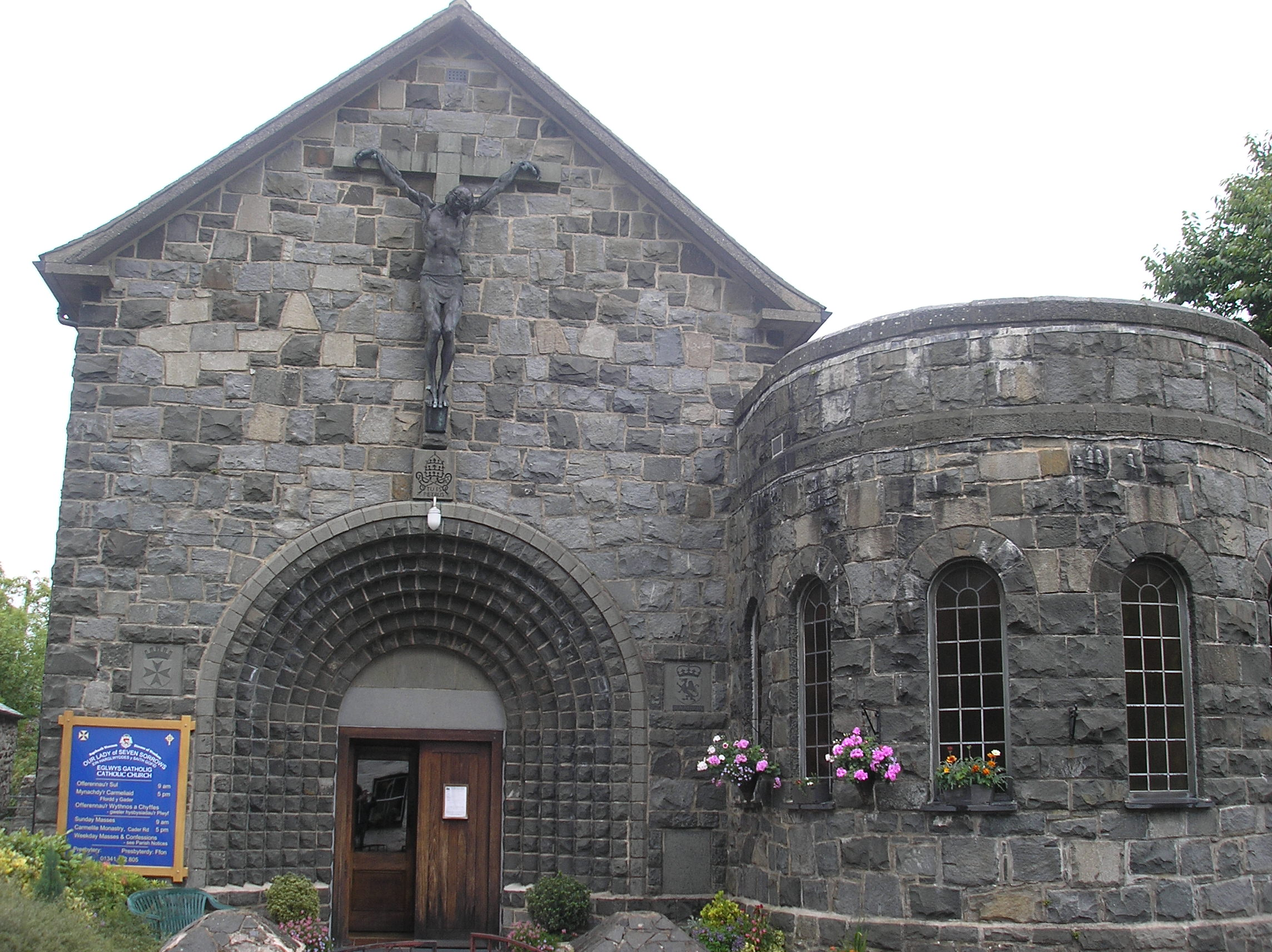
Our Lady of the Seven Sorrows Church, Dolgellau

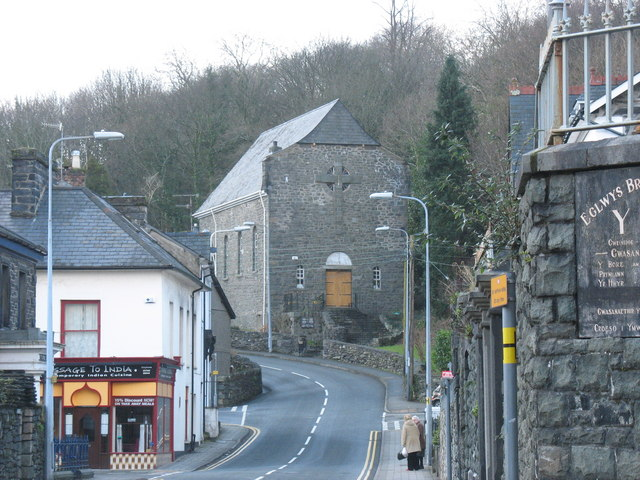
The Most Holy Redeemer, Porthmadog

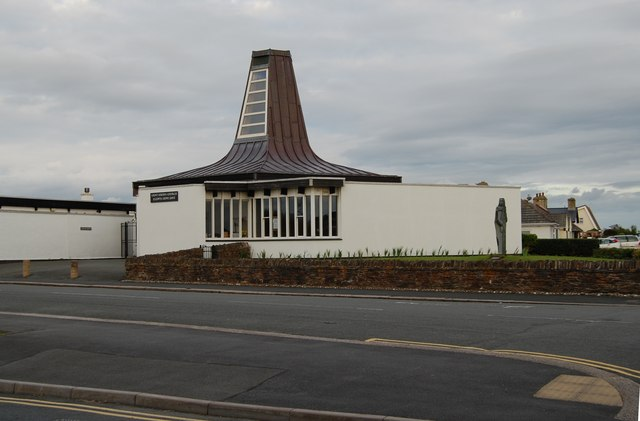
St David, Tywyn

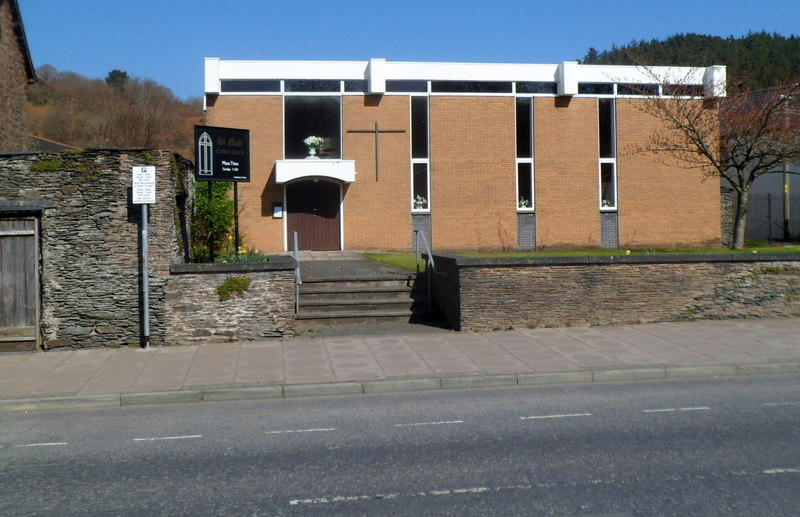
St Mair (Our Lady Help of Christians), Machynlleth
