= Cloghan =

Cloghan may refer to:

- Cloghan, County Donegal
- Cloghan, County Londonderry, a townland in County Londonderry, Northern Ireland
- Cloghan, County Offaly
- Cloghan, County Roscommon

== See also ==
- Cloghane, County Kerry
