= Our Lady of Seven Sorrows Church, Dolgellau =

Our Lady of Sorrows Church
- Our Lady of Seven Sorrows, Dolgellau
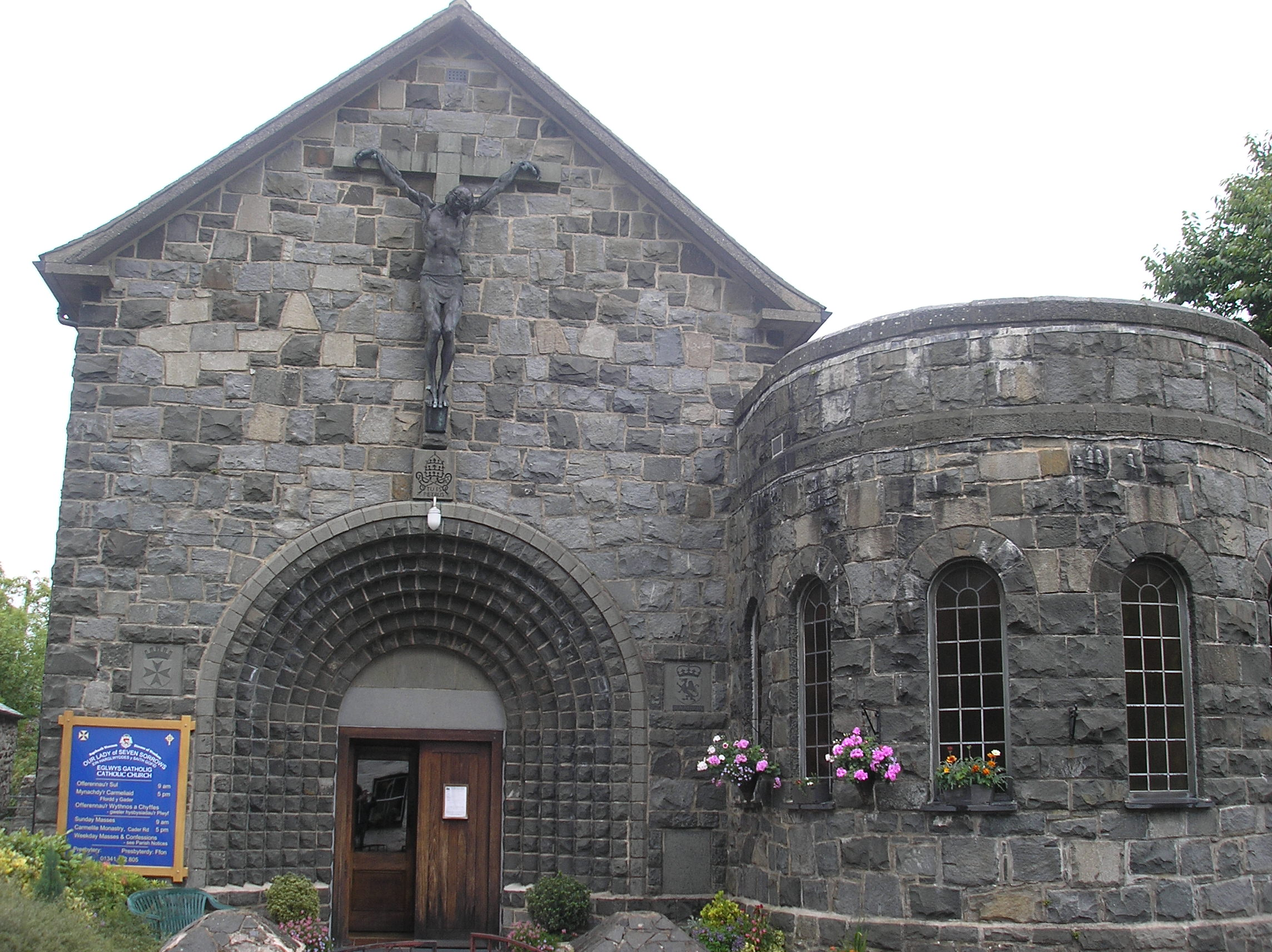
- Exterior
- Our Lady of Sorrows Church
- 52.7416°N 3.8846°W
- Location: Dolgellau, Gwynedd
- Country: Wales
- Denomination: Roman Catholic
- Website: Parish site

History
- Status: Active
- Founder: Fr Francis Scalpell
- Dedication: Our Lady of Sorrows
- Consecrated: 15 May 1967

Architecture
- Functional status: Parish church
- Heritage designation: Grade II listed
- Designated: 9 August 2007
- Architect: Maurice Pritchard
- Style: Romanesque Revival
- Groundbreaking: 1963
- Completed: September 1966
- Construction cost: £68,000

Specifications
- Capacity: 200
- Length: 88 ft (27 m)
- Width: 33 ft (10 m)
- Height: 28 ft (8.5 m)

Administration
- Province: Cardiff
- Diocese: Wrexham
- Deanery: Dolgellau

Our Lady of Sorrows Church or its full name Our Lady of Seven Sorrows Church is a Roman Catholic parish church in Dolgellau, Gwynedd. It was built in 1966 and is a Grade II listed building. It is situated on Meyrick Street close to the centre of town. It is administered in the Dolgellau Deanery of the Diocese of Wrexham.

== History ==
=== Origins ===
The founder of the church was Fr. Francis Scalpell, a Maltese priest who was ordained in Rome in 1921 and came to Liverpool in 1926. There, he started the parish of St Anthony of Padua in Mossley Hill. In 1938, he went to Haverfordwest and came to Dolgellau a year later.

At first, there was no place of worship for the local Catholics, so Mass was said in an old stable, with holes in the walls and the roof. Fr. Scalpell himself stayed in the attic of a nearby barn, which also had holes in the roof. Years later, the old stable was repaired, renovated and enlarged by joining it to a building that was previously a Fish and chip shop. During the Second World War, Italian prisoners of war helped with the panelling and the wooden floor.

=== Foundation ===
The local Catholic population of the area increased in number during the 1950s, so Fr. Scalpell felt that a new, larger church was required. He wrote over 25,000 letters to people around the world asking for donations for a new church. It is recorded in the parish, that in the early 1960s, a person unknown to the priest and the congregation stayed behind after Mass one Sunday and asked Fr. Scalpell how much more money was required for the new church. Fr. Scalpell stated the sum and the person said that it would be given and promptly left. Two days later, Fr. Scalpell received a letter from a solicitor informing the priest that the benefactor would donate the necessary money if the person remained anonymous and that the church 'must be a fine building, harmonising with its austere, mountainous surroundings.'

=== Construction ===
Building work started in 1963 and lasted for four more years and the total cost was £68,000. The architect, Maurice Pritchard and the builders, John Evans and Sons, were all from the local area. The church was built in a Norman style architecture with a crucifix above the main entrance designed by Benigno Mörlin Visconti Castiglione, a sculptor from Milan, who has work displayed in Milan Cathedral and St. Peter's Basilica in Rome.

The church was opened in September 1966. It was consecrated on 15 May 1967 by the Bishop of Menevia, John Edward Petit.

== Parish ==
Within the parish is a convent run by the Carmelites, Mass is said there by the local priest at 5pm every Sunday, and from Monday to Saturday at 9.30am. Sunday Masses are held in the church in the morning at 9:00am.

== Gallery ==
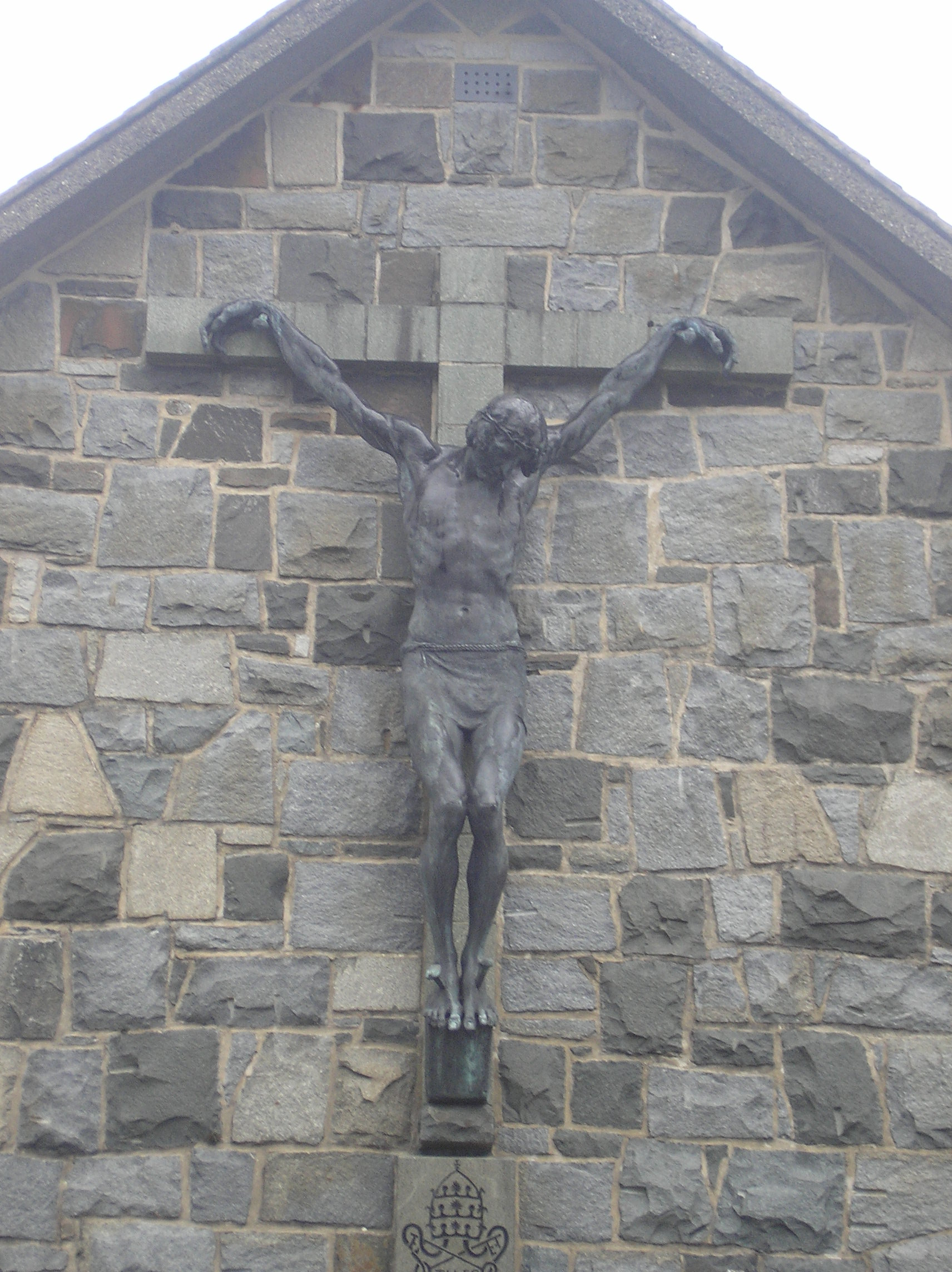
Crucifix by Benigno Mörlin Visconti Castiglione

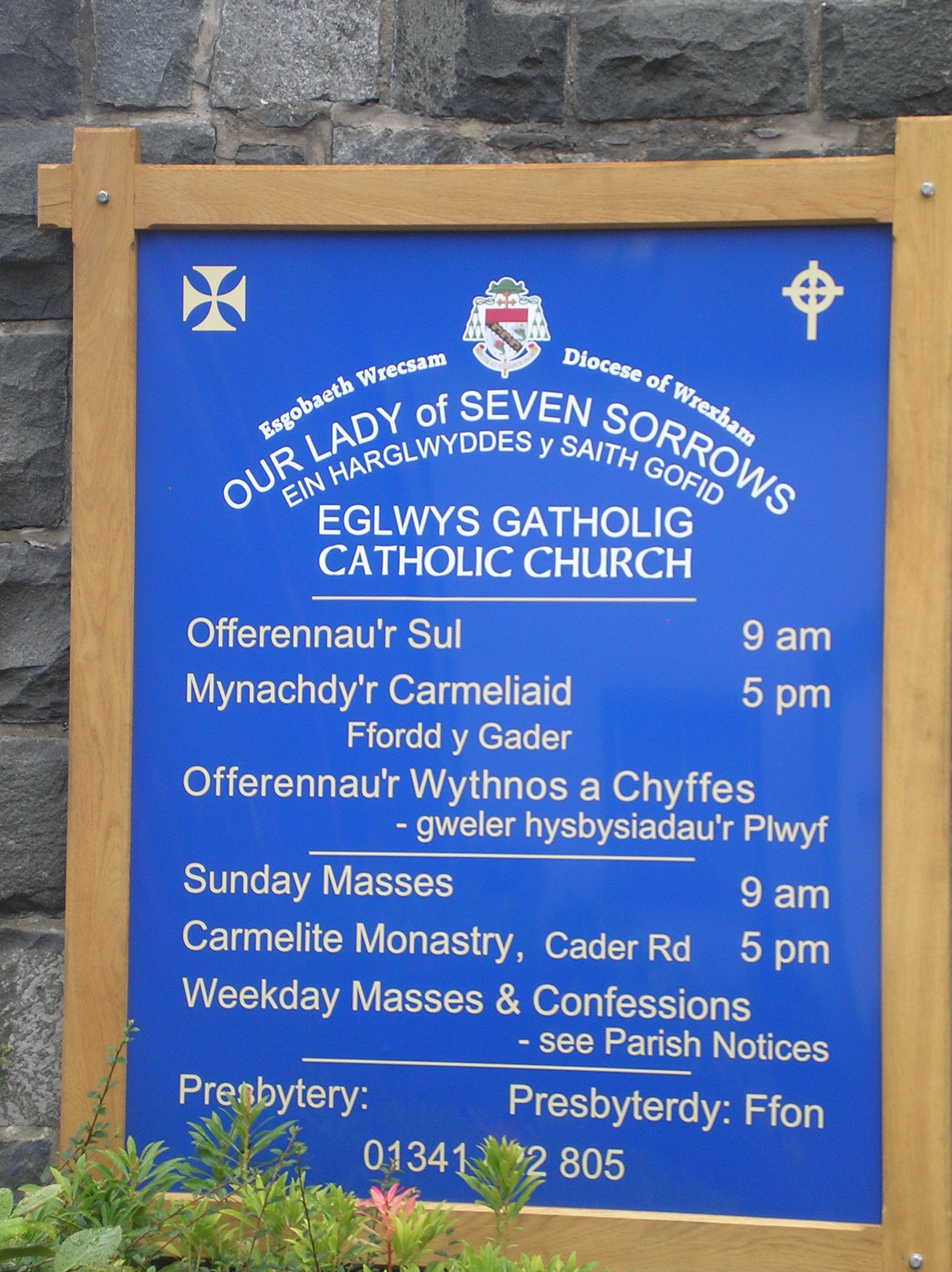
Church sign

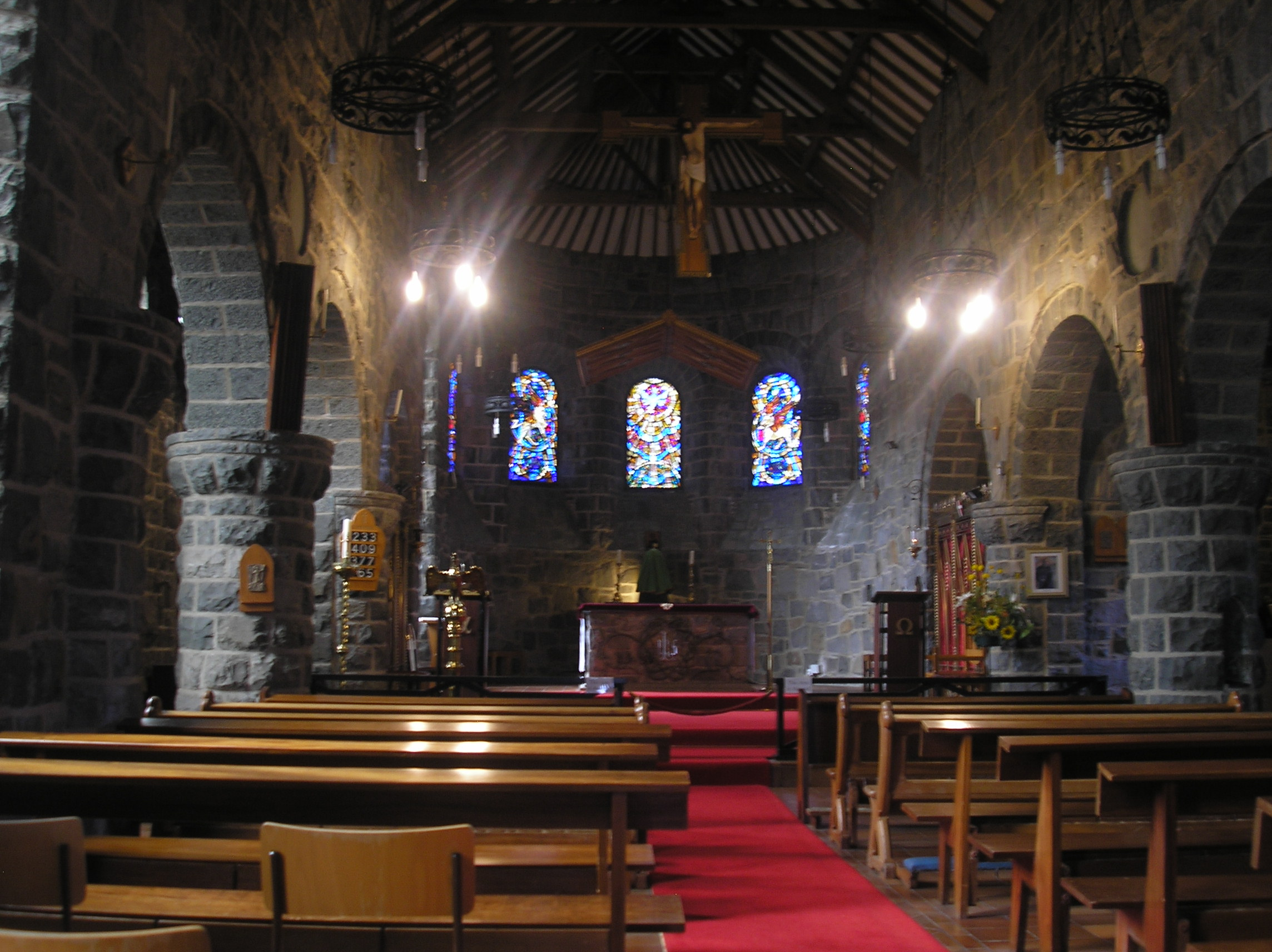
Interior

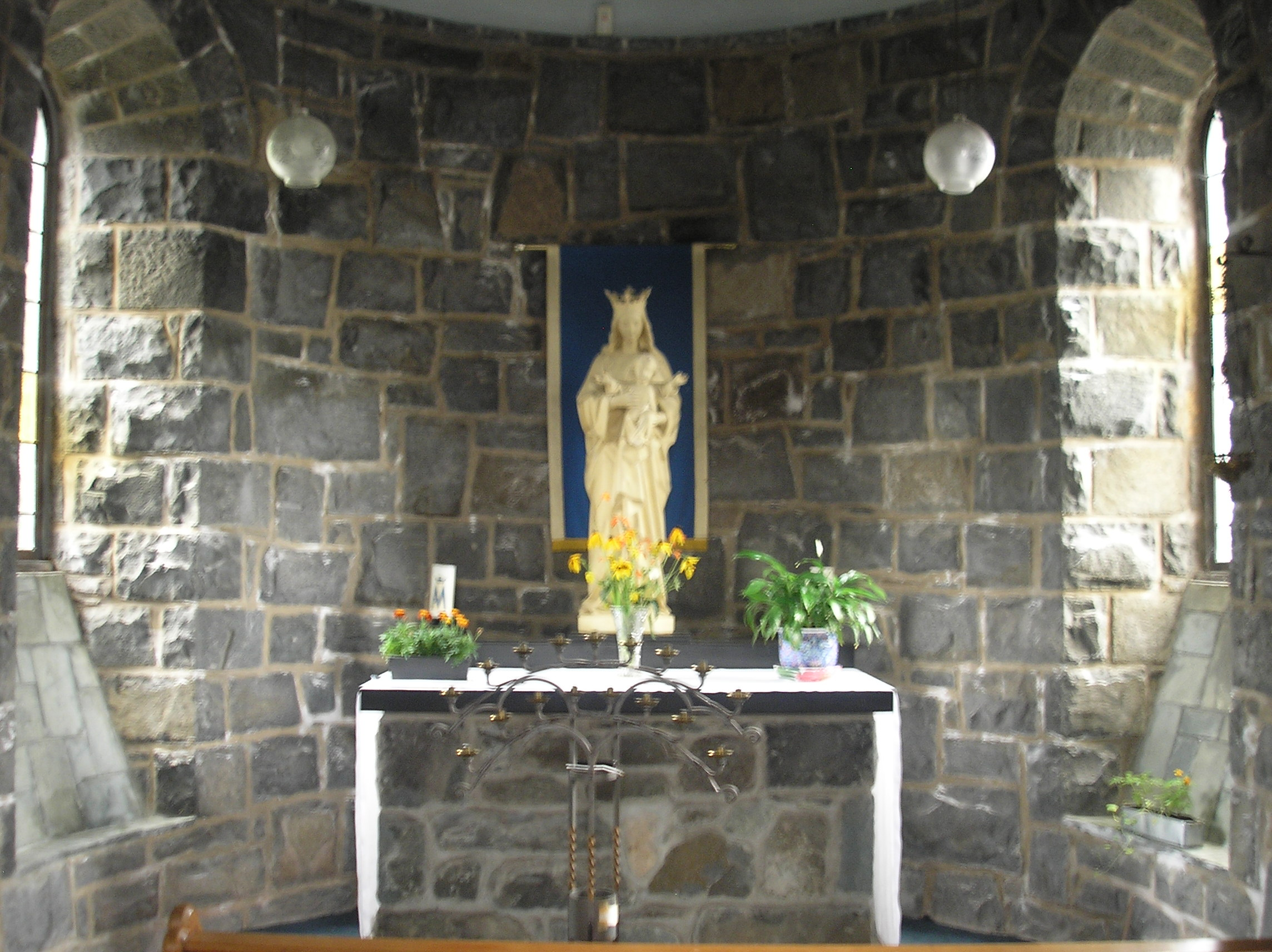
Lady Chapel

== See also ==
- Dolgellau
- Diocese of Wrexham
