= Bridgend Deanery =

Roman catholic deanery

The Bridgend Deanery is a Roman Catholic deanery in the Archdiocese of Cardiff-Menevia, previously in the Archdiocese of Cardiff, that covers several churches in Bridgend and the Vale of Glamorgan.

The dean is centred at St Mary's Church in Bridgend.

== Churches ==
- St Mary, Bridgend
- Our Lady Star of the Sea, Porthcawl - served from Bridgend
- St Joseph of Arimathea, Pyle - served from Bridgend
- Our Lady and Illtyd, Llantwit Major
- St Cadoc, Cowbridge - served from Llantwit Manor
- Our Lady and St Patrick, Maesteg
- St Robert of Newminster, Aberkenfig - served from Maesteg

== Gallery ==
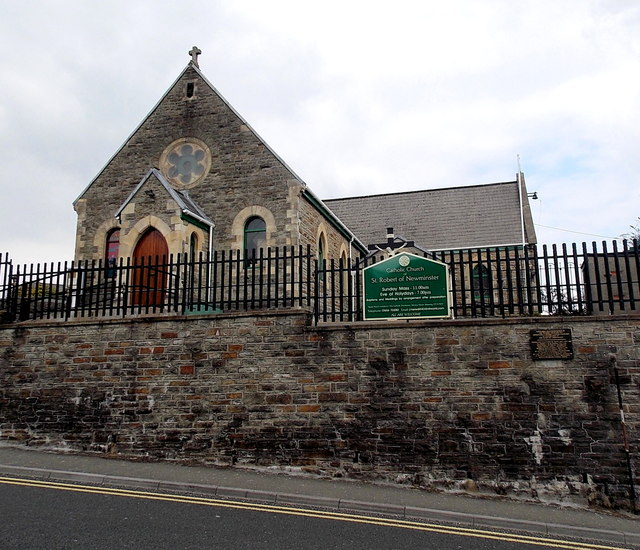
St Robert of Newminster Church, Aberkenfig

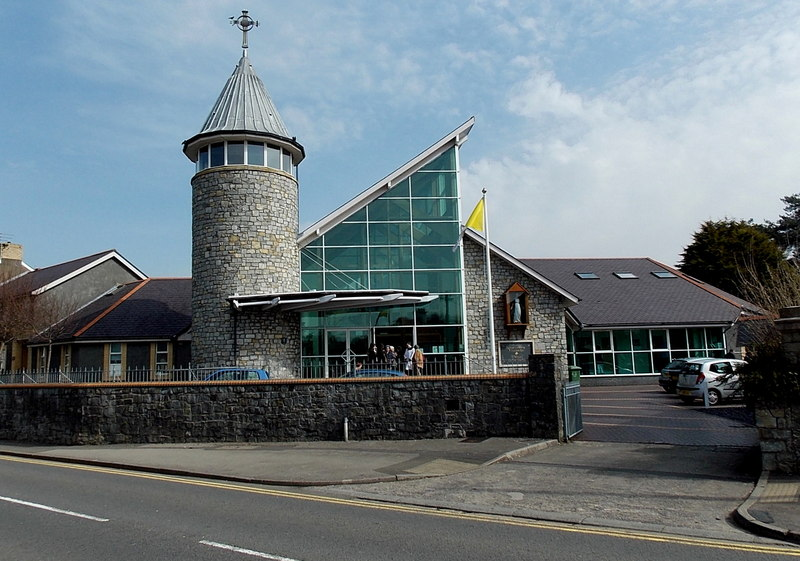
St Mary Church, Bridgend

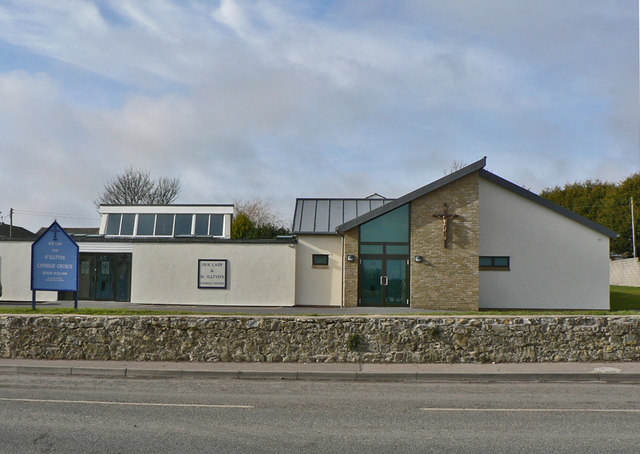
Our Lady and Illtyd, Llantwit Manor

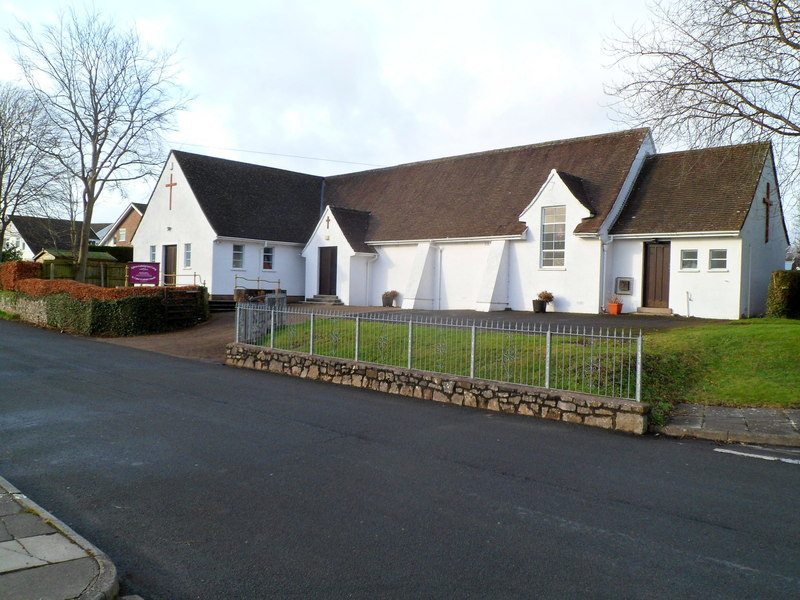
St Cadoc, Cowbridge

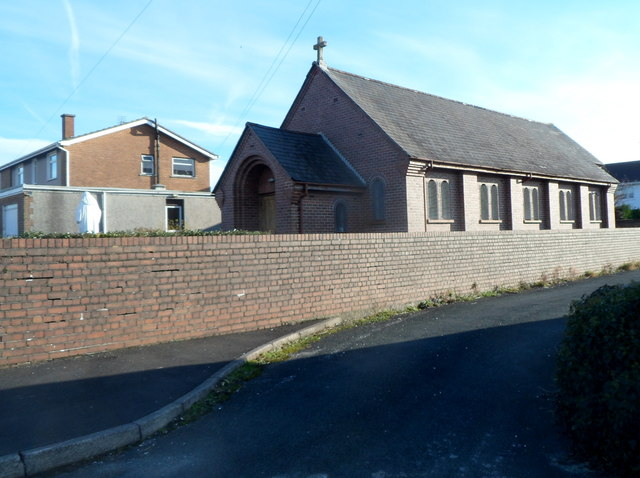
St Joseph of Arimathea, Pyle
