= Edwin Regan =

Catholic bishop (born 1935)

The Right Reverend Edwin Regan
- Bishop Emeritus of Wrexham
- Church: Roman Catholic Church
- Province: Cardiff
- Diocese: Wrexham
- Appointed: 7 November 1994
- Installed: 13 December 1994
- Term ended: 27 June 2012
- Predecessor: James Hannigan
- Successor: Peter Malcolm Brignall

Orders
- Ordination: 5 July 1959
- Consecration: 13 December 1994 by John Aloysius Ward

Personal details
- Born: 31 December 1935 (age 90) Port Talbot, Wales
- Denomination: Roman Catholic
- Education: St. John's Seminary, Waterford

Edwin Regan (born 31 December 1935) is a Welsh prelate of the Roman Catholic Church. He served as the second Bishop of Wrexham from 1994 to 2012.

== Biography ==
Edwin Regan was born in Port Talbot, and studied at St. John's Seminary, Waterford, Ireland, where he was ordained to the priesthood on 5 July 1959. He then served as assistant pastor at St. Alban's Church in Pontypool (1959) and at St. Joseph's Church in Neath (1959–1966). From 1966 to 1967, he attended Corpus Christi College in London, obtaining a diploma in catechetics.

Regan served as chaplain to Porthcawl Convent from 1967 to 1971, whence he became director of catechetics and cathedral administrator for the Archdiocese of Cardiff. He was raised to the rank of Honorary Canon in 1978, and Chapter Canon in 1985. He was later pastor of St Helen's Church in Barry (1984–1989) and of St. Mary's Church in Bridgend (1989–1994).

On 7 November 1994, Regan was appointed Bishop of Wrexham by Pope John Paul II. He received his episcopal consecration on the following 13 December from Archbishop John Ward, OFM Cap, with Bishops Daniel Mullins and Vincent Nichols serving as co-consecrators.

In addition to his Wrexham post, Regan was named Apostolic Administrator of the Archdiocese of Cardiff in December 2000, to assist the ailing Archbishop Ward in governing the archdiocese. This appointment was considered unusual, as an Apostolic Administrator is normally named when the sitting Ordinary has either died or resigned. Regan remained in the post until the appointment of Peter Smith as the new Archbishop of Cardiff on 26 October 2001.

On 27 June 2012 it was announced that Pope Benedict XVI had accepted Bishop Regan's resignation because he had reached the age limit and had appointed Mgr Peter Brignall, Vicar General of Wrexham, to succeed him as third bishop of the diocese. Bishop Regan moved to Blaenau Ffestiniog to serve as a parish priest for five years before finally retiring from ministry.

Catholic Church titles
Preceded by James Hannigan	Bishop of Wrexham; 1994–2012	Succeeded by Peter Malcolm Brignall
