= James Hannigan (bishop) =

Roman Catholic bishop

- Bishop of Wrexham
- Church: Catholic Church
- Diocese: Diocese of Wrexham
- In office: 12 February 1987 – 6 March 1994
- Predecessor: Diocese erected
- Successor: Edwin Regan
- Previous post: Bishop of Menevia (1983-1987)

Orders
- Ordination: 27 June 1954 by John Petit
- Consecration: 23 November 1983 by John Ward

Personal details
- Born: 15 July 1928 Glenfinn, Cloghan, County Donegal, Irish Free State, British Empire
- Died: 6 March 1994 (aged 65) Chester, Cheshire, United Kingdom

James Hannigan (15 July 1928 – 6 March 1994) was an Irish-born prelate of the Roman Catholic Church. He served in Wales, first as the Bishop of Menevia (1983–1987), then the Bishop of Wrexham (1987–1994).

Born in Cloghan in County Donegal on 15 July 1928, trained for the priesthood at the seminary of St Sulpice in Paris, and he was ordained to the priesthood on 27 June 1954. He was appointed the bishop of the Diocese of Menevia by the Holy See on 13 October 1983. His consecration to the Episcopate took place on 23 November 1983, with the principal consecrator being The Most Rev. John Ward, Archbishop of Cardiff, and the principal co-consecrators were The Rt Rev. Daniel Mullins, Auxiliary Bishop of Cardiff (later Bishop of Menevia), and The Most Rev. Séamus Hegarty, Bishop of Raphoe (later Bishop of Derry). Hannigan became the first Bishop of Wrexham on 12 February 1987.

Bishop Hannigan died in office at the Countess of Chester Hospital, Chester, England, on 6 March 1994, aged 65, and was buried in Wrexham Cemetery in Ruabon Road, Wrexham.

Catholic Church titles
Preceded by John Aloysius Ward	Bishop of Menevia; 1983–1987	Succeeded by Daniel Joseph Mullins
New title	Bishop of Wrexham; 1987–1994	Succeeded by Edwin Regan
