= Peter Brignall =

Catholic bishop of Wrexham

The Right Reverend Peter Brignall
- Bishop of Wrexham
- Church: Roman Catholic Church
- Province: Cardiff
- Diocese: Roman Catholic Diocese of Wrexham
- Appointed: 27 June 2012
- Installed: 12 September 2012
- Predecessor: Edwin Regan

Orders
- Ordination: 18 February 1978 by Langton Douglas Fox
- Consecration: 12 September 2012 by Edwin Regan

Personal details
- Born: Peter Malcolm Brignall; 5 July 1953 (age 73) Whetstone, London
- Denomination: Roman Catholic
- Motto: vivite et vigilate in Deo
- Coat of arms

Peter Malcolm Brignall (born 5 July 1953) is the Roman Catholic Bishop of Wrexham.

Born in Whetstone, London on 5 July 1953, he was ordained as a deacon by Victor Guazzelli, Auxiliary Bishop of Westminster in July 1977, and as a priest by Langton Douglas Fox, Bishop of Menevia on 18 February 1978. Nearly nine years later, Brignall was incardinated as a priest of the Diocese of Wrexham on 12 February 1987.

He was appointed the Bishop of the Diocese of Wrexham by the Holy See on 27 June 2012. His consecration to the Episcopate took place at St. Mary's Cathedral, Wrexham on 12 September 2012; the principal consecrator was the Edwin Regan, Bishop emeritus of Wrexham, with Archbishop Antonio Mennini, Apostolic Nuncio to Great Britain and Patrick O'Donoghue, Bishop emeritus of Lancaster serving as principal co-consecrators.

Brignall has amalgamated parishes but his proposed church closure at Conwy has been overruled.

Catholic Church titles
| Preceded by Edwin Regan | Roman Catholic Bishop of Wrexham; 2012–present | Incumbent |
