= Bishop of Wrexham =

Catholic bishopric in Wales

- Bishopric

catholic
- Incumbent: Peter Brignall

Location
- Ecclesiastical province: Cardiff

Information
- First holder: James Hannigan
- Established: 12 February 1987
- Diocese: Wrexham
- Cathedral: Wrexham Cathedral

The Bishop of Wrexham is the Ordinary of the Roman Catholic Diocese of Wrexham in the Province of Cardiff in Wales.

The diocese covers an area of 8,361 km^{2} (3,228 sq mi) and consists of the Welsh historic counties of Anglesey, Caernarfonshire, Denbighshire, Flintshire, Merionethshire and Montgomeryshire (the local government areas of Conwy, Anglesey, Denbighshire and Flintshire, Gwynedd, Wrexham and the former Montgomeryshire).

The see is in the city of Wrexham where the bishop's seat is located at the Cathedral Church of Our Lady of Sorrows.

The diocese was erected on 12 February 1987 from the Diocese of Menevia. The current bishop is the Right Reverend Peter Brignall, the 3rd Bishop of Wrexham.

== List of the Bishops of Wrexham ==
Bishops of Wrexham
From	Until	Incumbent	Notes
1987	1994	James Hannigan	Previously Bishop of Menevia (1983–1987). Appointed to Wrexham on 12 February 1987. Died in office on 7 March 1994.
1994	2012	Edwin Regan	Former priest of the Archdiocese of Cardiff from 1959. Consecrated as bishop on 13 December 1994. Retired in September 2011.
2012	Present	Peter Brignall	Formerly the Vicar General of the diocese from 2003. He was consecrated as bishop on 12 September 2012.
