= Cloghan, County Donegal =

Village in County Donegal, Ireland

Cloghan An Clochán
- Village
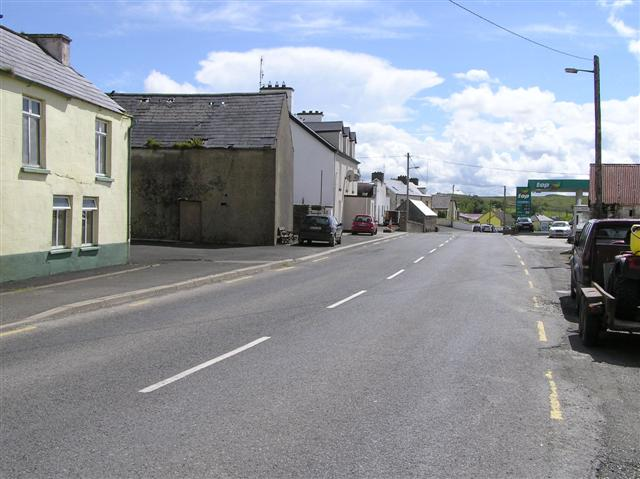
- R252 road through the village

- Location in Ireland
- Coordinates: 54.84249°N 7.93685°W
- Country: Ireland
- Province: Ulster
- County: County Donegal

Government
  - Dáil Éireann: Donegal
- Area code: 074

Cloghan (Irish: An Clochán) is a village in the rural centre of County Donegal, Ireland. Cloghan is on the R252 regional road, 13 km (8 mi) northwest of the "Twin Towns" of Ballybofey and Stranorlar.

Cloghan has one of the most prolific wild salmon and sea trout fishing areas in Ireland. The Finn River system includes a catchment area of about 510 square kilometres (195 sq mi) and includes up to 20 loughs as well as the River Finn and River Reelan.

The area is also known as a hunting location and has miles of hiking trails in the Bluestack Mountains that divides County Donegal, north from south.

== Irish language ==
There are 488 people living in the area, and 38% are Irish speakers.

== People ==
- James Hannigan, former Bishop of Menevia and Bishop of Wrexham, was born in Cloghan.
- Frank McGlynn, Gaelic footballer, was born in Cloghan.
- Patrick Carlin, father of American comedian George Carlin, was born in Cloghan.

== See also ==
- List of populated places in Ireland
