= Wrexham Cathedral =

Roman Catholic cathedral in Wales

Coordinates: 53°02′51″N 2°59′55″W

- Cathedral Church of Our Lady of Sorrows (St Mary's)
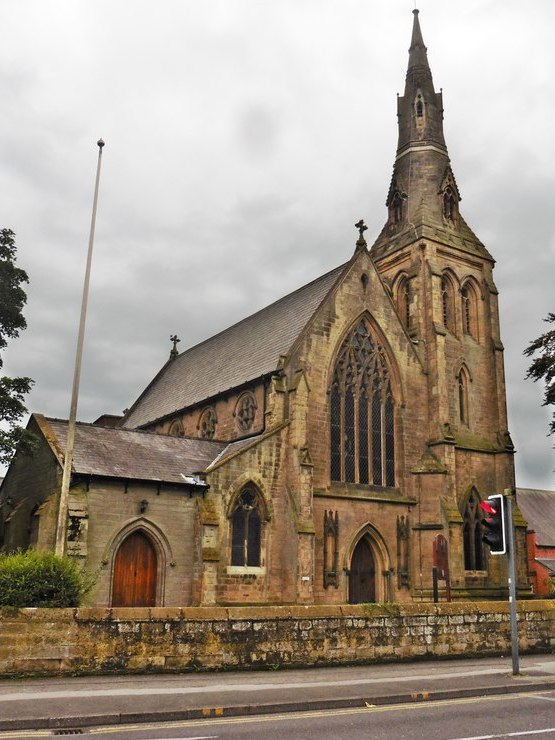
- Exterior

- Shown within Wrexham
- Location: Wrexham,
- Country: Wales
- Denomination: Roman Catholic

History
- Consecrated: 1857

Architecture
- Architect: E. W. Pugin
- Style: Gothic Revival
- Years built: 1857

Administration
- Province: Cardiff
- Diocese: Wrexham

Clergy
- Bishop: Peter Brignall

The Cathedral Church of Our Lady of Sorrows, also known as St Mary's Cathedral (Welsh: Eglwys Gadeiriol y Santes Fair) or Wrexham Cathedral, is a Roman Catholic cathedral in Wrexham, Wales. It is the seat of the Bishop of Wrexham, and mother church of the Roman Catholic Diocese of Wrexham (founded in 1987).

== History ==
The cathedral was originally built as a parish church in 1857. Its architect, Edward Welby Pugin, adopted a 14th-century Decorated Gothic style. The church replaced an earlier chapel, located in King Street, which by the 1850s was deemed insufficient for the growing congregation, and finance was provided by a local industrialist. Further additions to satisfy a still-growing congregation were made in the mid-20th century, in the form of the cloister and side chapel.

The church was designated a pro-cathedral in 1898 upon the establishment of the Roman Catholic Diocese of Menevia. It was consecrated on 7 November 1907.

== The cathedral today ==
Wrexham Cathedral is now a Grade II listed building.

== Notable memorials ==
- Plaque to Flight Lieutenant David Lord (killed 1944), Victoria Cross recipient at Battle of Arnhem.

== See also ==
- List of cathedrals in the United Kingdom
