= Cardiff Metropolitan Cathedral =

Roman Catholic cathedral in Wales

- Cardiff Metropolitan Cathedral of St David
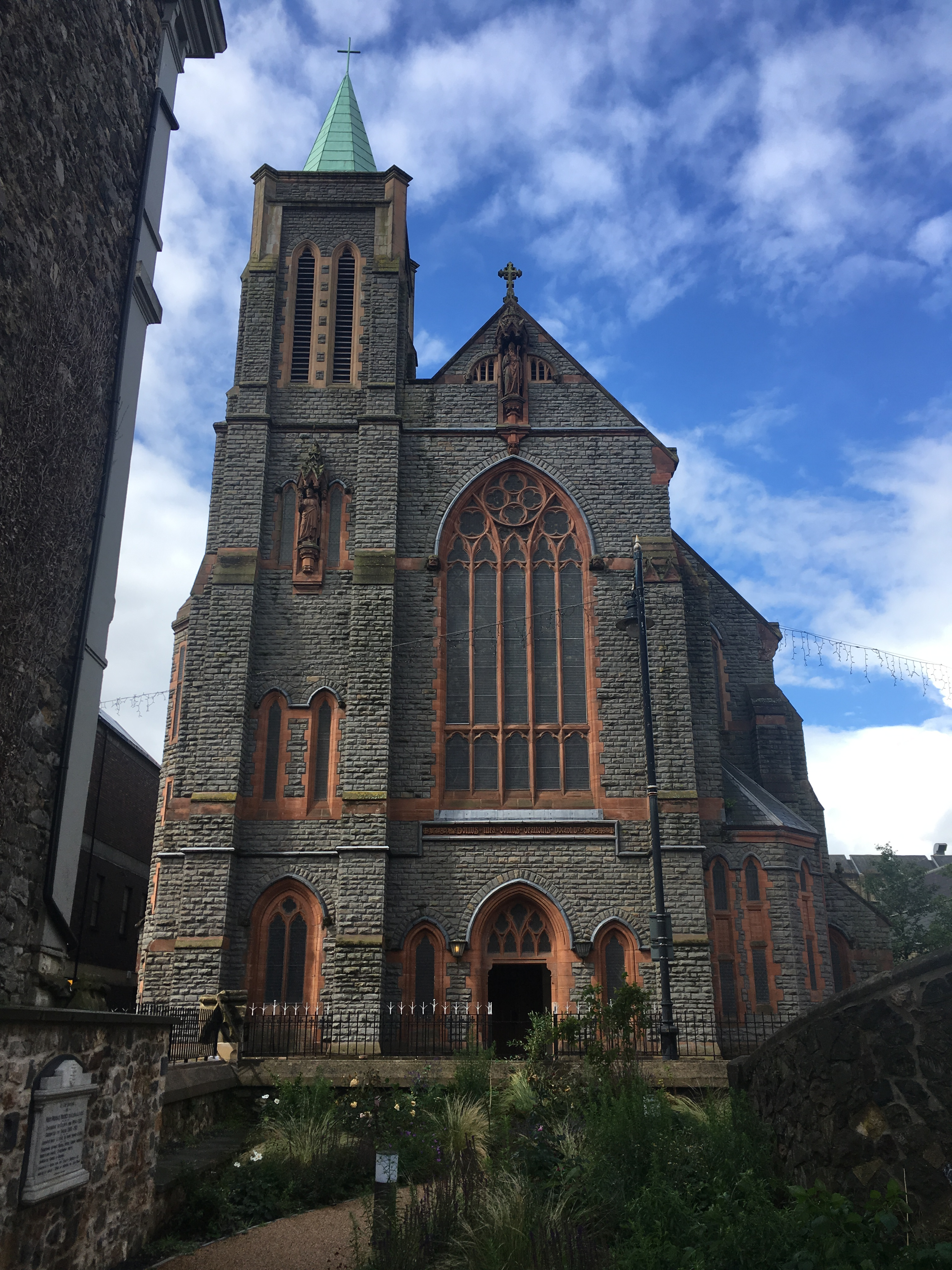

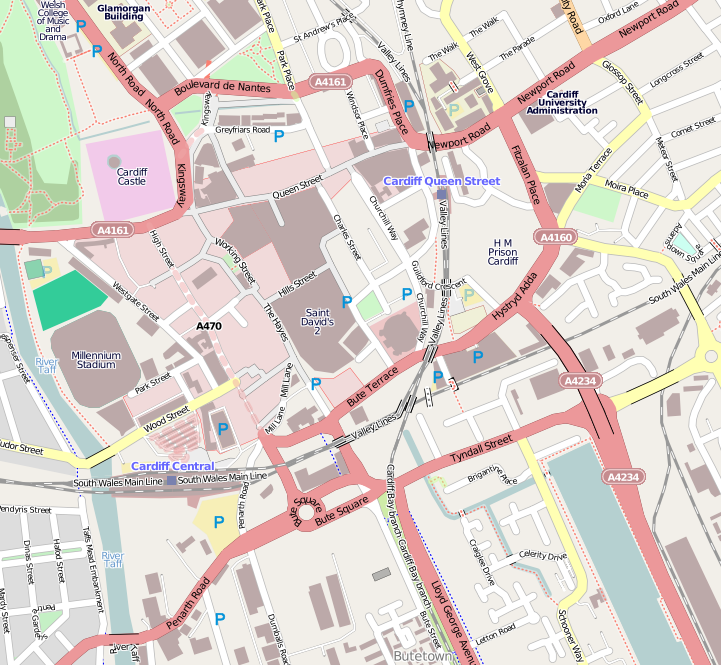
- Shown within Cardiff
- 51.4809°N 3.1740°W
- OS grid reference: 318569_176430
- Location: Cardiff
- Country: Wales
- Denomination: Roman Catholic
- Website: cardiffcathedral.org.uk

History
- Status: Cathedral
- Consecrated: 1842, 1959

Architecture
- Functional status: Active
- Architect(s): Pugin and Pugin, F. R. Bates, Son, & Price
- Style: Gothic Revival
- Years built: 1839–1842, 1950's

Administration
- Province: Cardiff-Menevia
- Archdiocese: Cardiff-Menevia

Clergy
- Archbishop: Mark O'Toole
- Dean: Canon Michael Doyle

The Metropolitan Cathedral Church of St David (Welsh: Eglwys Gadeiriol Fetropolitan Dewi Sant), also known as St David's Cathedral, Cardiff, is a Catholic cathedral in the city centre of Cardiff, Wales, and is the centre of the Archdiocese of Cardiff-Menevia.

Located in Charles Street, the cathedral remains the focal point for Catholic life in Cardiff, and the country as a whole. It is one of only three Catholic cathedrals in the United Kingdom that is associated with a choir school.

== History ==
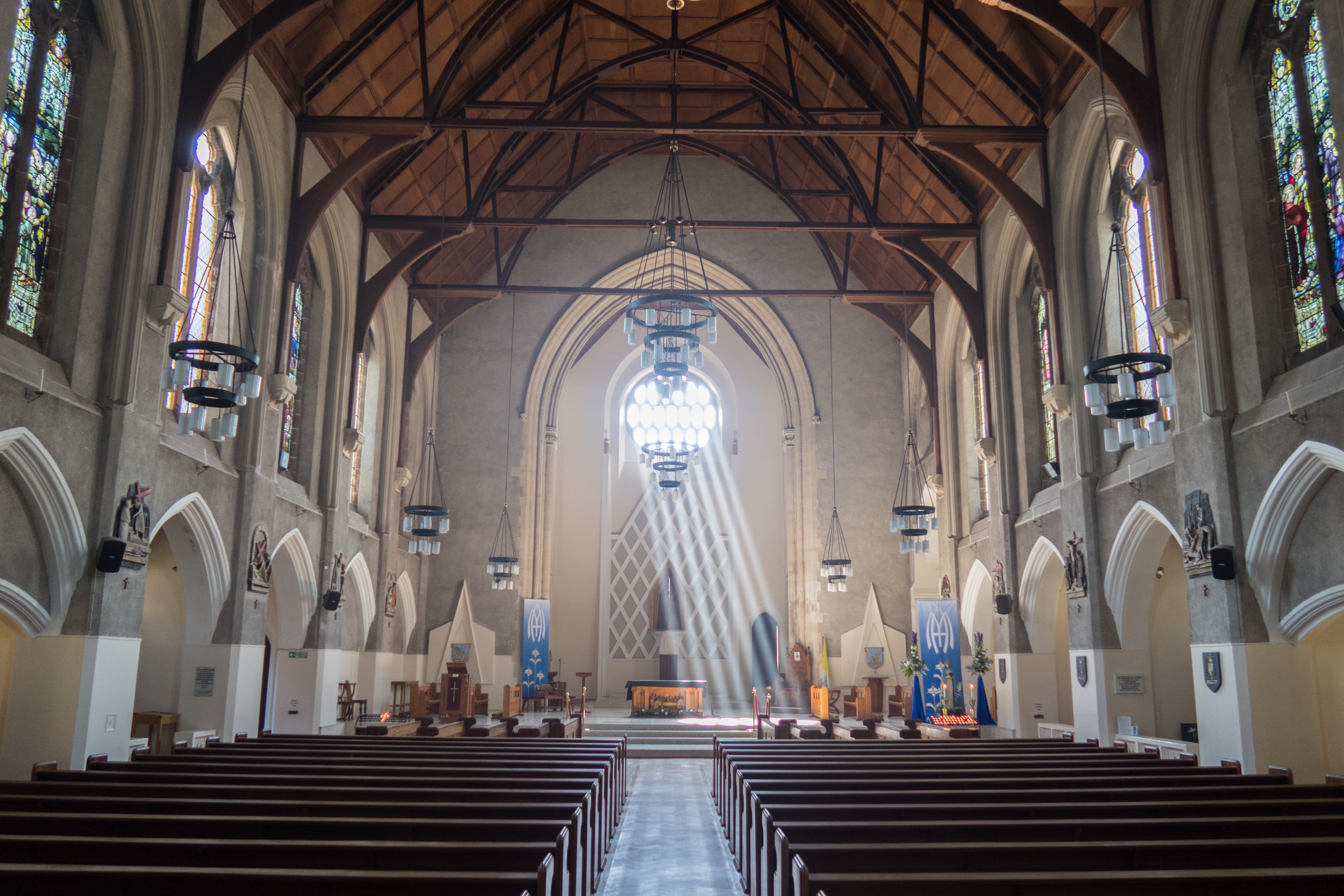
The nave of the cathedral

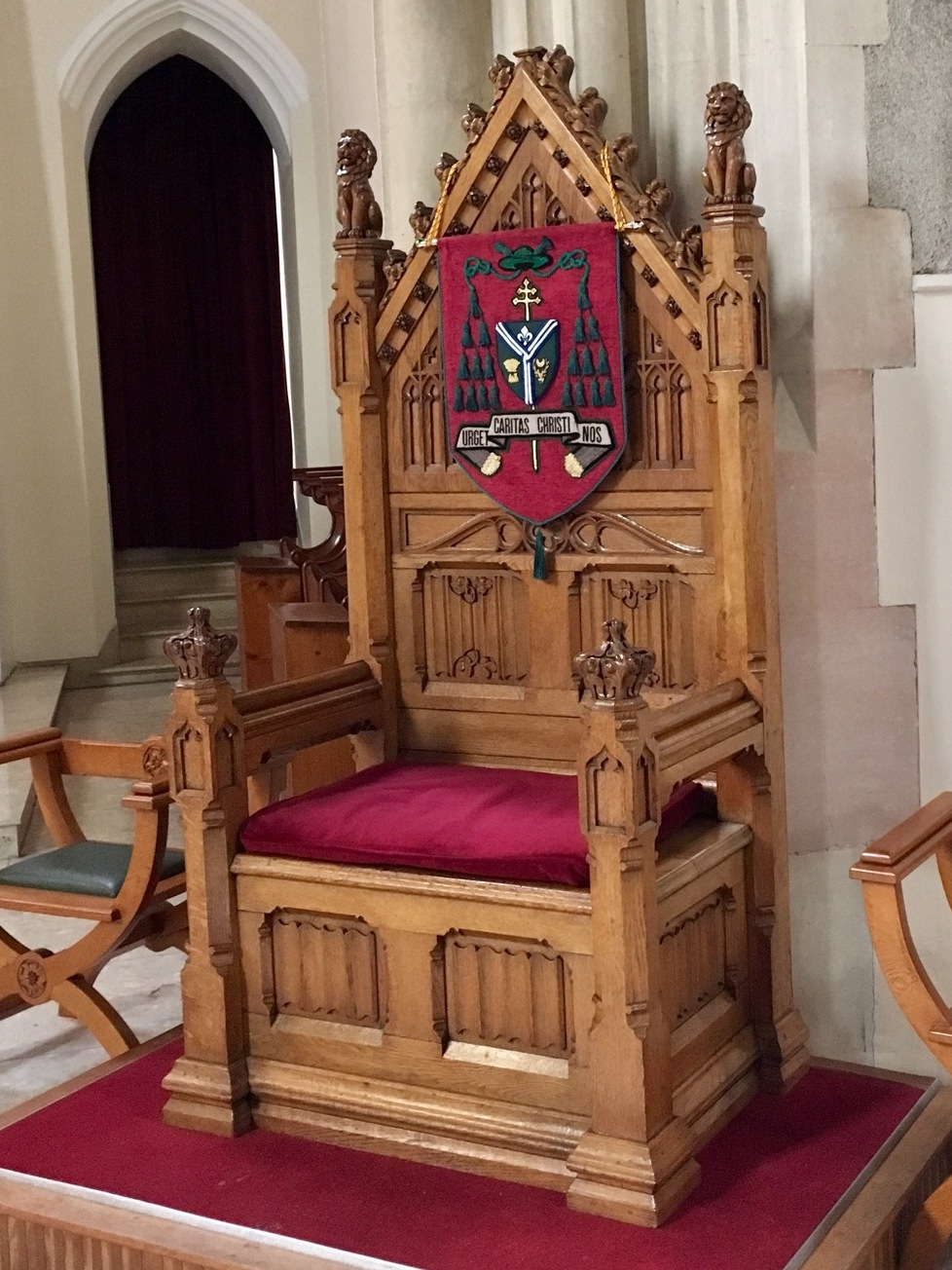
The bishop’s throne

The original church was built at a cost of £2,124 in 1842, after fundraising in Wales and Ireland and a donation by Lady Catherine Eyre of Bath. The church was located on David Street, Cardiff, and was dedicated to the patron saint of Wales, St David, at the request of Lady Eyre.

The current building was designed by Pugin and Pugin Architects and constructed 1884–1887. It was Cardiff's principal Catholic church, and it became seat of the Roman Catholic Archbishop of Cardiff in 1916. In 1920, it was declared the cathedral church of the new Archdiocese of Cardiff.

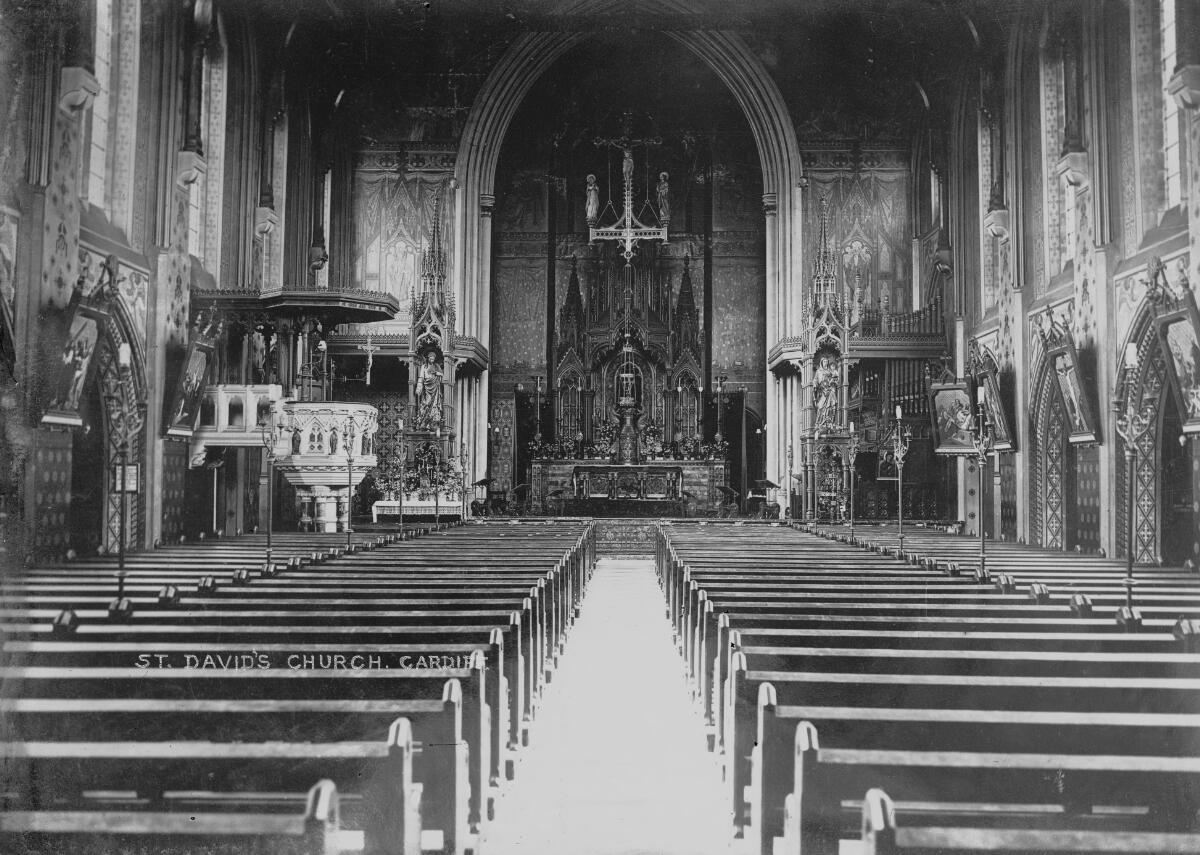
The nave of the cathedral before the bombing during World War 2.

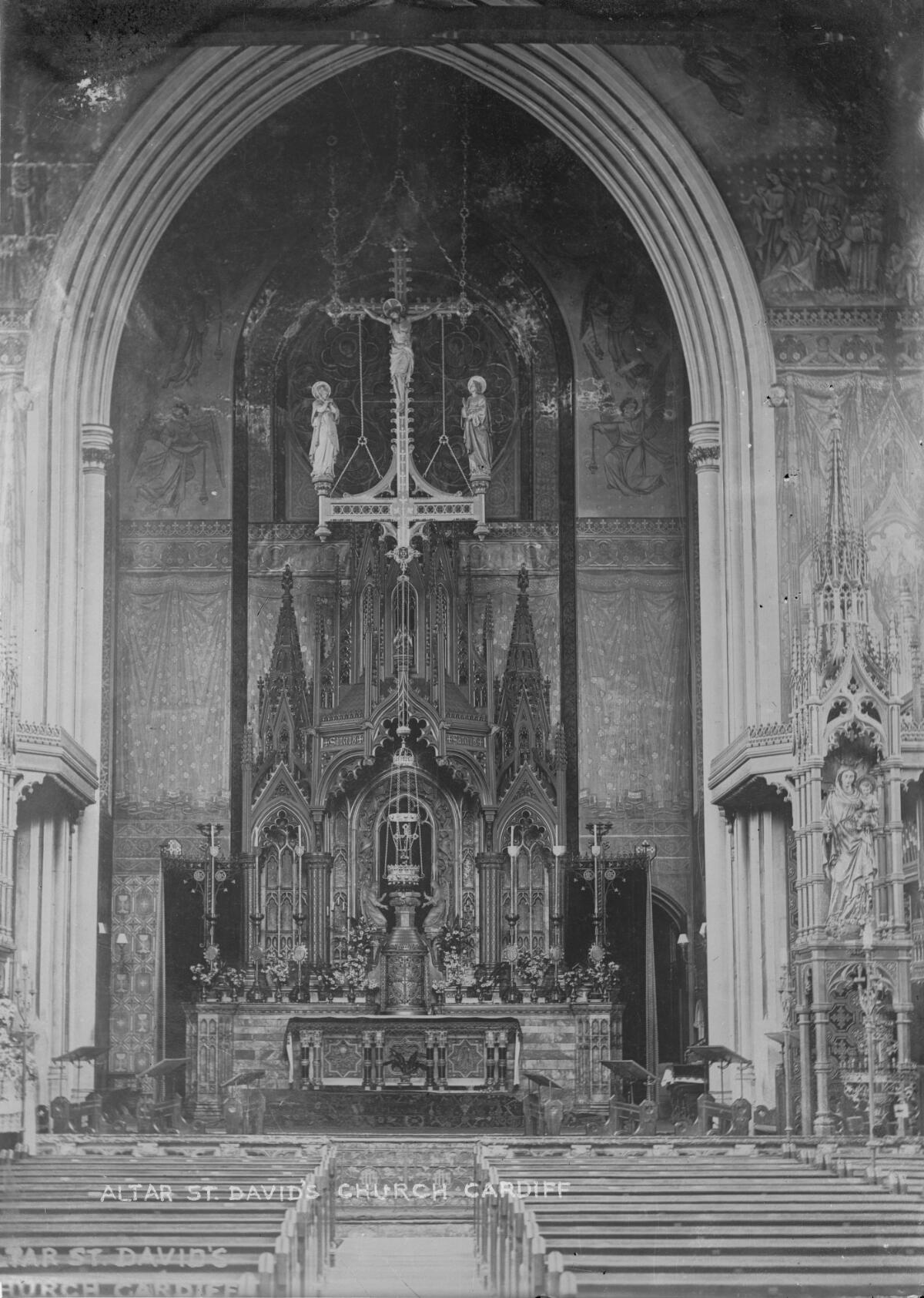
The sanctuary and high altar of the cathedral before the bombing in 1941.

The cathedral was destroyed by World War II bombing in March 1941 when incendiary bombs pierced the roof. During the 1950s it was restored and rebuilt, under the supervision of F. R. Bates, Son, and Price, and was re-opened in March 1959.

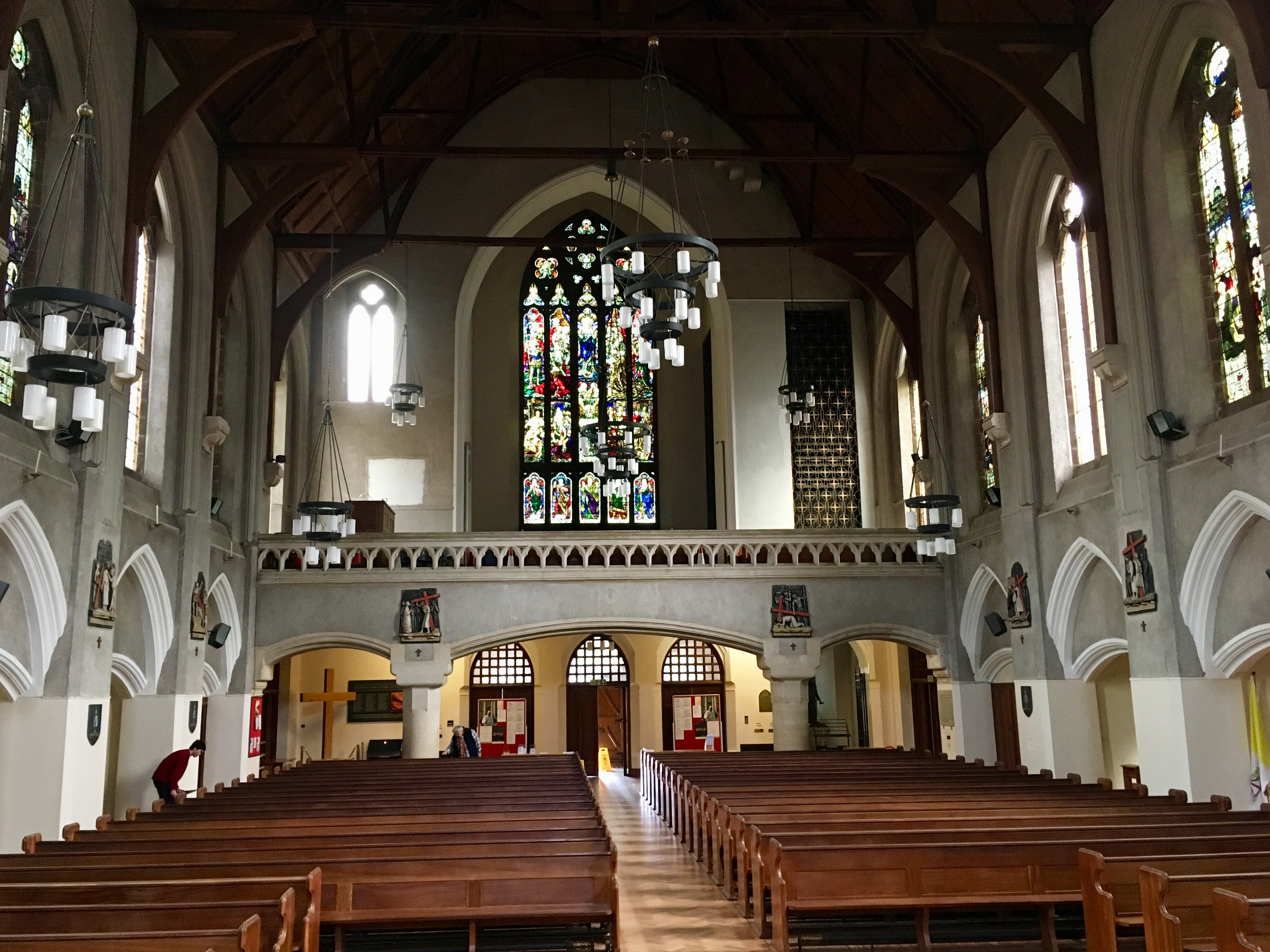
A view of the nave facing the west window depicting the Immaculate Conception of the Blessed Virgin Mary

== Music ==
The Boys' Choir was established in 1959, and in recent years the choir has expanded, and now comprises 65 boys and girls, student choral scholars and professional lay clerks.

The cathedral boy choristers and girl choristers are educated at the Choir School in St John's College, Cardiff, founded by David Neville in 1987 as the Choir-school to the Metropolitan Cathedral.

David Neville, Founding Principal of the Choir School at St John's College and Cathedral Director of Music and Organist 1980–2016, received the Papal Cross Pro Ecclesia et Pontifice in 1991 for his services to cathedral music, and in 1997 he was a first recipient of the Archbishop of Wales Award for Church Music, chaired by George Guest, CBE. In December 2015, Neville received a Papal Knighthood of the Order of St Gregory in recognition of his lifetime of service. David's last service at the cathedral before his sudden death in April 2016 was a live broadcast on BBC Radio 4 in January before an audience of 1.6 million. As a composer, David wrote works on a vast scale for chorus and orchestra, including The Wreck of the Deutschland, directed by the internationally renowned conductor Vernon Handley at Hereford Cathedral. He was commissioned by the Welsh Arts Council, the Elgar Festival and the BBC, and his compositions have been performed in BBC broadcast and at Westminster Abbey and St Paul's Cathedral. In the year 2000, Neville was commissioned to compose a royal fanfare for the National Millennium Service attended by Princes Charles, William and Harry.

Under the direction of Dominic Neville, the choir sang four annual concerts in Cardiff at St David's Hall and the Dora Stoutzker Concert Hall at the Royal Welsh College of Music and Drama, and at leading venues across the UK such as Westminster Abbey, Christ Church Cathedral, Oxford, and St Paul's Cathedral, London. International tours have included performances at Notre Dame Cathedral and the Madeleine Paris, Madrid and El Escorial (Spain), and the cathedrals of Ghent and Bruges (Belgium), Haarlem (Netherlands) and Ribe (Denmark). The Choir has performed in collaboration with The Schola of Brompton Oratory London, Chamber Strings of Melbourne Australia, St Bavo Cathedral Choir in Haarlem, Netherlands, Tennessee Tech Chorale, Philadelphia Boys Choir, Uppingham School Choir, and Gonville and Caius Chapel Choir Cambridge. In collaboration with conductor David Atherton, the trebles have sung in collaborations with BBC National Chorus of Wales and BBC National Orchestra of Wales (Britten Spring Symphony / Atherton) broadcast on BBC Radio 3. In 2012, the choir sang with The Tallis Scholars' performance of Tallis's forty-part motet Spem in Alium, conducted by Peter Phillips at St David's Hall. Other recent performances include singing for the Prince Charles at the Opening of the Cornerstone, where the choir sang from the David Neville Gallery. The choristers appeared and sang in the 'Christmas Special' of BBC's Doctor Who and sang in the major Hollywood feature film One Chance. One of the choir's leading trebles, Dylan Oshnoei, also sang in the acclaimed BBC production The Hollow Crown.

The choirs can be heard in live broadcasts, including on BBC Radio 4 with an estimated audience of 1.6 million, and BBC Radio Wales.

The current director of music, both at St John's College and at the cathedral, is Jeffrey Howard. Prior to joining the cathedral, Howard worked with the Royal Philharmonic Orchestra, Royal Liverpool Philharmonic Orchestra, BBC National Orchestra of Wales, Welsh National Opera Orchestra, City of Birmingham Symphony Orchestra and the Budapest Symphony Orchestra. Alongside his work at the cathedral, Howard remains a key vocal Coach at the Royal Welsh College of Music and Drama, the Welsh National Opera and Welsh National Youth Opera, as well as the Wales International Academy of Voice and on the Music Theatre Course at the RWCMD, and has previously worked as Vocal Tutor for Cardiff and Bristol Universities.

== Clergy ==
=== Current priests ===
The Archbishop of Cardiff, Most Reverend Mark O'Toole, acts as the rector of the cathedral.Very Rev. Canon Michael Doyle assumes responsibility for the day-to-day life of the cathedral as Dean.

=== Past priests ===
Cardiff Cathedral has had many priests in charge since its consecration in 1842.

- Rev. P. Millea
- Rev. T. Cody
- Rev. S. Bruno, IC (1874–1883)
- Very Rev. Mgr. William Williams (1884–1895)
- Rev. A. van den Heuvel (1896–1922)
  - In 1916 St David's Church became St David's Cathedral
- Very Rev. Canon D. J. Hannon (1923–1936)
- Very Rev. Canon William Coonan (1937–1941)
- Rt. Rev. Mgr. Peter F. Gavin (1941–1959)
- Rt. Rev. Mgr. John Crowe (1959–1963)
- Very Rev. Canon Bernard Cosulich (1963–1971)
- Rev. William Donovan (1971–1972)
- Very Rev. Canon Edwin Regan (1972–1985)
- Rev. Bernard Whitehouse (1985–2001)
- Very Rev. Canon Peter G. Collins (2001–2019)
- Rev. Daniel J. Stanton (2019–2021)
- Rev. Robert James (2021–2023)
- Very Rev. Canon Michael Doyle (2023- )
