= Diocese of Wrexham =

Latin Catholic diocese in Wales

Coordinates: 52.92°N 3.57°W

Diocese of Wrexham Dioecesis Gurecsamiensis Esgobaeth Wrecsam

Catholic
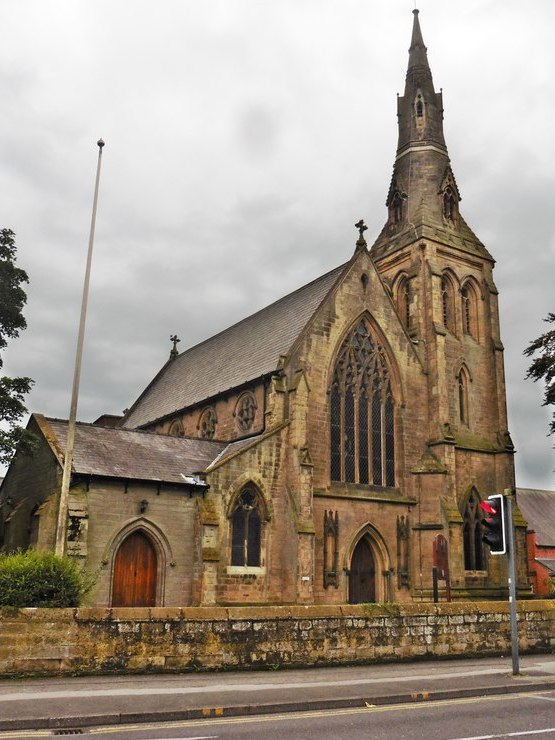
- Cathedral of Our Lady of Sorrows

- Logo

Location
- Country: Wales
- Territory: North Wales
- Ecclesiastical province: Cardiff-Menevia
- Deaneries: 4

Statistics
- Area: 8,361 km^{2} (3,228 sq mi)
- Population: Total; Catholics: (as of 2025); 758,600; 33,897 (4.1%)
- Parishes: 29
- Churches: 41
- Schools: 16

Information
- Denomination: Catholic Church
- Sui iuris church: Latin Church
- Rite: Roman Rite
- Established: 12 February 1987
- Cathedral: Cathedral of Our Lady of Sorrows
- Patron saint: St David
- Secular priests: 8

Current leadership
- Pope: Leo XIV
- Bishop: Peter Brignall
- Metropolitan Archbishop: Mark O'Toole
- Vicar General: Rev Canon Zbigniew Swoboda
- Bishops emeritus: Edwin Regan

Map
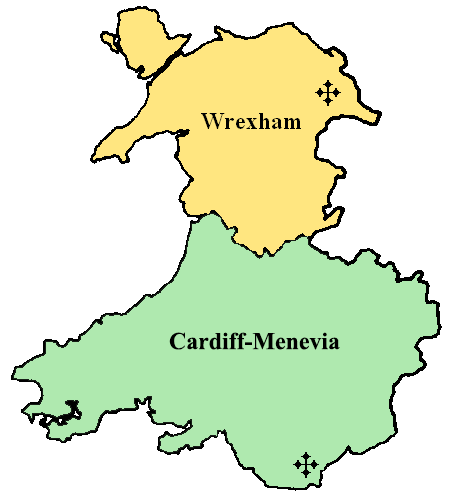
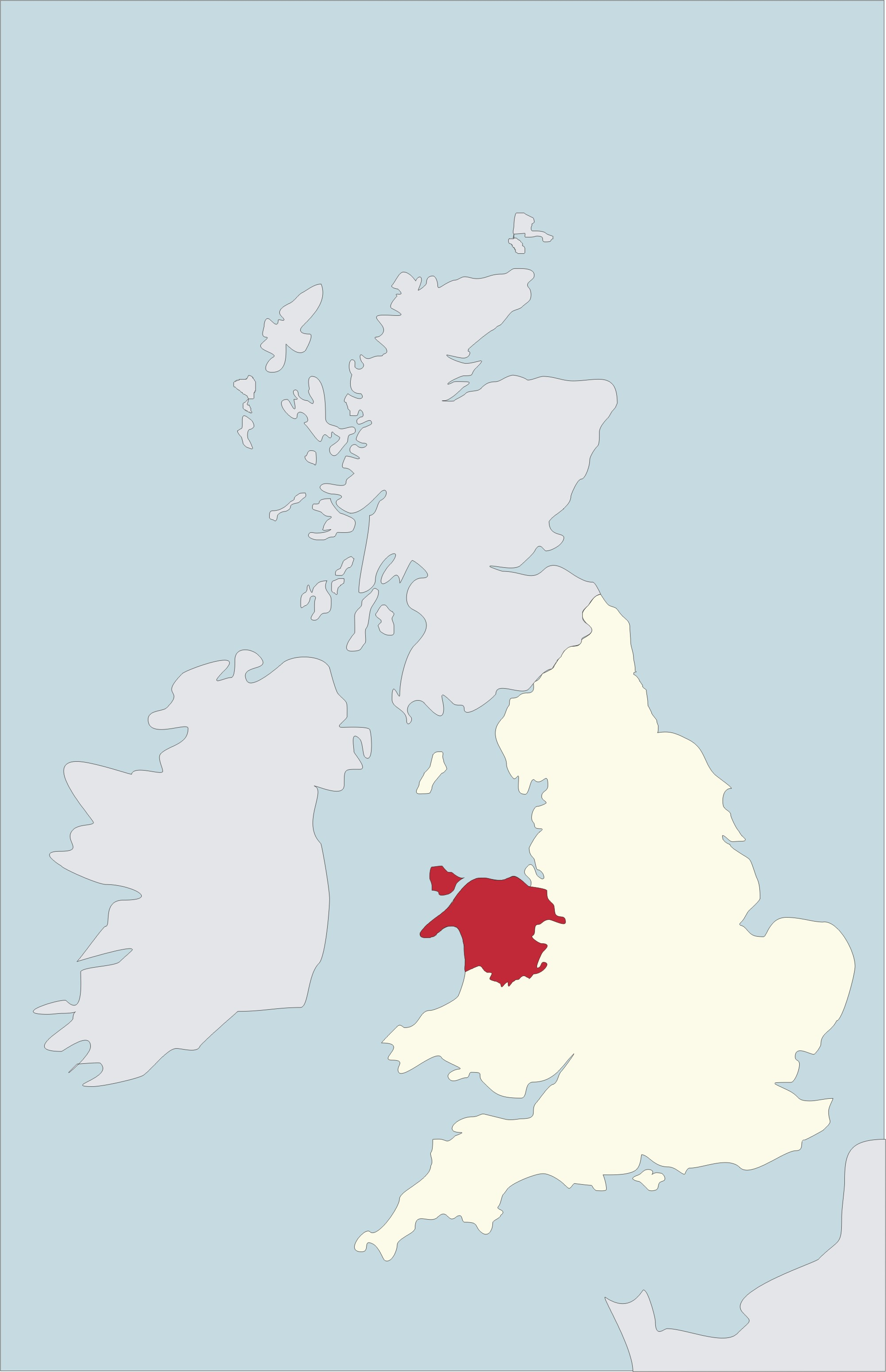

Website
- Official website

The Diocese of Wrexham (Latin: Dioecesis Gurecsamiensis) is a Latin Church ecclesiastical territory or diocese of the Catholic Church in Wales. The diocese is a suffragan in the ecclesiastical province of the metropolitan Archdiocese of Cardiff-Menevia.

== History ==
The diocese was erected on 12 February 1987 from the Diocese of Menevia. Before 1916 this territory was part of the Roman Catholic Diocese of Shrewsbury. The current bishop is The Right Reverend Peter Brignall, the 3rd Bishop of Wrexham. On 27 June 2012, Pope Benedict XVI appointed the then Monsignor Brignall, who was at that time the Diocese of Wrexham's Vicar General, to succeed the retiring bishop, Edwin Regan. Bishop Peter's episcopal ordination took place on 12 September 2012 in Wrexham Cathedral.

=== Timeline ===
- 29 September 1850: Universalis Ecclesiae: The Roman Catholic Church in Wales is split between the Diocese of Shrewsbury in the north and the Diocese of Newport and Menevia in the south.
- 4 September 1860: Belmont Abbey, Herefordshire, the cathedral priory of the Diocese of Newport and Menevia, is consecrated.
- 4 July 1895: The Diocese of Newport and Menevia splits. Glamorgan, Monmouth and Herefordshire become the Diocese of Newport. The rest of Wales, including North Wales from the Diocese of Shrewsbury, becomes the Apostolic Vicariate of Wales.
- 12 May 1898: The Apostolic Vicariate of Wales become the Diocese of Menevia with Wrexham Cathedral as its pro-cathedral.
- 7 February 1916: The Diocese of Newport becomes the Archdiocese of Cardiff and it is decided that St. David's Church in Cardiff would become its cathedral.
- 12 March 1920: St David's Cathedral in Cardiff is officially made the metropolitan cathedral of the Archdiocese of Cardiff.
- 12 February 1987: The Diocese of Menevia is split. The north becomes the Diocese of Wrexham with its cathedral remaining in Wrexham. The south remains the Diocese of Menevia and sets up Swansea Cathedral.

== Details ==
The diocese covers an area of 8,361 km² of the ancient counties of Anglesey, Caernarfonshire, Denbighshire, Flintshire, Merionethshire and Montgomeryshire (the local government areas of Conwy, Anglesey, Denbighshire and Flintshire, Gwynedd, Wrexham and the former Montgomeryshire).

The see is in the city of Wrexham where the seat is located at the Cathedral Church of Our Lady of Sorrows.

== Bishops ==
(Any dates appearing in italics indicate de facto continuation of office. The start date of tenure below is the date of appointment or succession. Where known, the date of installation and ordination as bishop are listed in the notes together with the post held prior to appointment.)

Tenure	Incumbent	Notes
12 February 1987 – 7 March 1994	James Hannigan	Bishop of Menevia; died in office
7 November 1994 – 12 September 2012	Edwin Regan	Priest of Menevia; consecrated 13 December 1994
12 September 2012 – present	Peter Brignall	Vicar General of the diocese from 2003.

== Episcopal Vicariates ==
There are a total of 4 Episcopal Vicariates in the Diocese of Wrexham, all of which cover several churches in that area, overseen by a Dean.

The deaneries include:

- Ss Asaph and Tudno
- Ss Beuno and Garmon
- St Mary
- St Winefride

== See also ==
- Lists of office-holders
- St Winefride's Well
- St Beuno's Jesuit Spirituality Centre
- List of Catholic churches in the United Kingdom
