= Archbishop of Cardiff–Menevia =

Ordinary of the Roman Catholic Archdiocese of Cardiff–Menevia

- Archbishopric

catholic
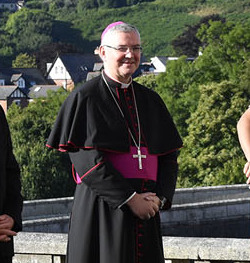
- Incumbent; Mark O'Toole

Location
- Ecclesiastical province: Cardiff

Information
- Established: 2024; 1916 (as Cardiff)
- Diocese: Cardiff–Menevia
- Cathedral: St David's Cathedral, Cardiff
- Co-cathedral: St Joseph's Cathedral, Swansea

The Archbishop of Cardiff–Menevia is the ordinary of the Archdiocese of Cardiff–Menevia.

The position came about after the merger of the Archdiocese of Cardiff and the Diocese of Menevia in 2024, after the positions of bishops of those dioceses were held by the same person, Mark O'Toole. The archdiocese covers an area of 10,899 square miles (28,230 km^{2}) and spans the historic county of Herefordshire and all of South Wales. The metropolitan see of the previous archdiocese was in the city of Cardiff where the archbishop's seat was located at the Metropolitan Cathedral Church of St David and the seat of the Diocese of Menevia was in St Joseph's Cathedral, Swansea.

With the exception of the second archbishop, Francis Mostyn, born in Flintshire and of local descent, the Welsh connections of the archbishops and bishops have been extremely weak. Ireland, London and the English provinces have supplied a majority.

The see is currently held by Mark O'Toole, the 1st Archbishop of Cardiff–Menevia. He was originally the 8th and last Archbishop of Cardiff and 12th and last Bishop of Menevia, who was appointed by the Holy See on 27 April 2022 and installed at St David's Cathedral, Cardiff on 20 June and St Joseph's Cathedral, Swansea on 23 June 2022.

== History ==
The Vicariate Apostolic of the Welsh District was created out of the Western District of England and Wales in 1840. The Welsh District covered all of the principality of Wales and the English county of Herefordshire. On the restoration of the Catholic hierarchy in England and Wales in 1850, the Welsh District was divided. The southern half became the Diocese of Newport and Menevia and the northern half became part of the Diocese of Shrewsbury. In 1895, the diocese lost territory on the creation of the Vicariate Apostolic of Wales, which became the diocese of Menevia in 1898. As a result, the see changed its name to simply the diocese of Newport. Following further reorganisation of the Catholic Church in Wales in 1916, the diocese of Newport was elevated to an ecclesiastical province and changed its name to the archdiocese of Cardiff. The archbishop has jurisdiction over the bishops of Menevia and Wrexham. The Diocese of Menevia was merged into the Archdiocese of Cardiff, to become the Archdiocese of Cardiff–Menevia in 2024.

== Office holders ==
=== Vicars Apostolic of the Welsh District ===
Vicars Apostolic of the Welsh District
From	Until	Incumbent	Notes
1840	1850	Thomas Joseph Brown	Appointed Vicar Apostolic of the Wales District and Titular Bishop of Apollonia on 5 June 1840 and consecrated on 28 October 1840. Appointed Bishop of Newport and Menevia on 29 September 1850.
In 1850, the southern half of the Welsh district became the Diocese of Newport and Menevia.

=== Vicars Apostolic of Wales ===
Vicars Apostolic of Wales
From	Until	Incumbent	Notes
1895	1898	Francis Edward Joseph Mostyn	Appointed Vicar Apostolic of Wales and Titular Bishop of Ascalon on 4 July 1895 and consecrated on 14 September 1895. Appointed Bishop of Menevia on 14 May 1898 when the district was elevated to a diocese.

=== Bishops of Newport and Menevia ===
In 1895, the episcopal title became simply the Bishop of Newport.

Bishops of Newport and Menevia
From	Until	Incumbent	Notes
1850	1880	Thomas Joseph Brown	Hitherto Vicar Apostolic of the Welsh District. Appointed Bishop of Newport and Menevia on 29 September 1850. Died in office on 12 April 1880.
1881	1915	John Cuthbert Hedley	Formerly an auxiliary bishop of Newport and Menevia (1873–1881). Appointed bishop on 18 February 1881. His episcopal title changed to Bishop of Newport in 1895. Died in office on 11 November 1915.
In 1916, the see was elevated to an archdiocese and changed its name to Cardiff.

=== Bishop of Menevia ===
Bishops of Menevia
From	Until	Incumbent	Notes
1898	1921	Francis Edward Joseph Mostyn	Formerly Vicar Apostolic of Wales (1895–1898). Appointed Bishop of Menevia on 14 May 1898. Translated to the archbishopric of Cardiff on 7 March 1921.
1921	1926	See vacant	
1926	1935	Francis John Vaughan	Appointed bishop on 21 June 1926, consecrated on 8 September 1926, installed on 14 September 1926. Died in office on 13 March 1935.
1935	1940	Michael Joseph McGrath	Appointed bishop on 10 August 1935 and consecrated on 24 September 1935. Translated to the archbishopric of Cardiff on 20 June 1940.
1941	1946	Daniel Joseph Hannon	Appointed bishop on 15 March 1941 and consecrated on 1 May 1941. Died in office on 26 April 1946.
1947	1972	John Edward Petit	Appointed bishop on 8 February 1947 and consecrated on 25 March 1947. Retired on 16 June 1972 and died on 2 June 1973.
1972	1981	Langton Douglas Fox	Formerly an auxiliary bishop of Menevia (1965–1972). Appointed Bishop of Menevia on 16 June 1972. Resigned on 5 February 1981 and died on 26 July 1997.
1981	1983	John Aloysius Ward	Appointed Coadjutor Bishop of Menevia on 25 July 1980 and consecrated on 1 October 1980. Succeeded Bishop of Menevia on 5 February 1981. Translated to the archbishopric of Cardiff on 25 March 1983.
1983	1987	James Hannigan	Appointed bishop on 13 October 1983 and consecrated on 23 November 1983. Translated to the bishopric of Wrexham on 12 February 1987.
1987	2001	Daniel Joseph Mullins	Formerly an auxiliary bishop of Cardiff (1970–1987). Appointed Bishop of Menevia on 12 February 1987. Resigned on 12 June 2001.
2001	2008	John Peter Mark Jabalé, O.S.B.	Appointed Coadjutor Bishop of Menevia and consecrated on 7 December 2000. Succeeded Bishop of Menevia on 12 June 2001. Retired on 16 October 2008.
2008	2019	Thomas Matthew Burns, S.M.	Previously Bishop of H.M. Forces (2013–2022). Appointed Bishop of Menevia on 22 October 2008 and installed on 1 December 2008. Resigned 11 July 2019.
2019	2022	See vacant	
2022	2024	Mark O'Toole	Previously Bishop of Plymouth (2004–2008). Appointed Bishop of Menevia on 22 April 2022 and installed on 23 June 2022. Also appointed Archbishop of Cardiff, thereby merging the two dioceses in persona Episcopi - in the person of the Bishop.
Diocese merged with Cardiff

=== Archbishops of Cardiff ===
Roman Catholic Archbishops of Cardiff
From	Until	Incumbent	Notes
1916	1920	James Romanus Bilsborrow	Formerly Bishop of Port-Louis, Mauritius (1910–1916). Appointed archbishop on 7 February 1916. Resigned on 16 December 1920 and appointed Titular Archbishop of Cius. Died on 19 June 1931.
1921	1939	Francis Edward Joseph Mostyn	Formerly Bishop of Menevia (1898–1921). Appointed archbishop on 7 March 1921. Died in office on 25 October 1939.
1940	1961	Michael Joseph McGrath	Formerly Bishop of Menevia (1935–1940). Appointed archbishop on 20 June 1940. Died in office on 28 February 1961.
1961	1983	John Aloysius Murphy	Formerly Bishop of Shrewsbury (1949–1961). Appointed archbishop on 22 August 1961. Retired on 25 March 1983 and died on 18 November 1995.
1983	2001	John Aloysius Ward	Formerly Bishop of Menevia (1981–1983). Appointed archbishop on 25 March 1983. Removed by the Pope on 26 October 2001 and died on 27 March 2007.
2001	2010	Peter David Smith	Formerly Bishop of East Anglia] (1995–2001). Appointed archbishop on 26 October 2001. Translated to the archbishopric of Southwark on 10 June 2010.
2011	2022	George Stack	Formerly an auxiliary bishop of Westminster. Appointed archbishop on 19 April 2011 and installed on 20 June 2011. Retired on 20 June 2022.
2022	2024	Mark O'Toole	
Diocese merged with Cardiff

=== Archbishops of Cardiff–Menevia ===
Roman Catholic Archbishops of Cardiff–Menevia
From	Until	Incumbent	Notes
2024	Present	Mark O'Toole	

== See also ==
- Roman Catholicism in England and Wales

== Bibliography ==
- Brady, W. Maziere (1876). The Episcopal Succession in England, Scotland and Ireland, A.D. 1400 to 1875. Vol. 3. Rome: Tipografia Della Pace.
