= St Mary's College, Aberystwyth =

- Coleg Mair
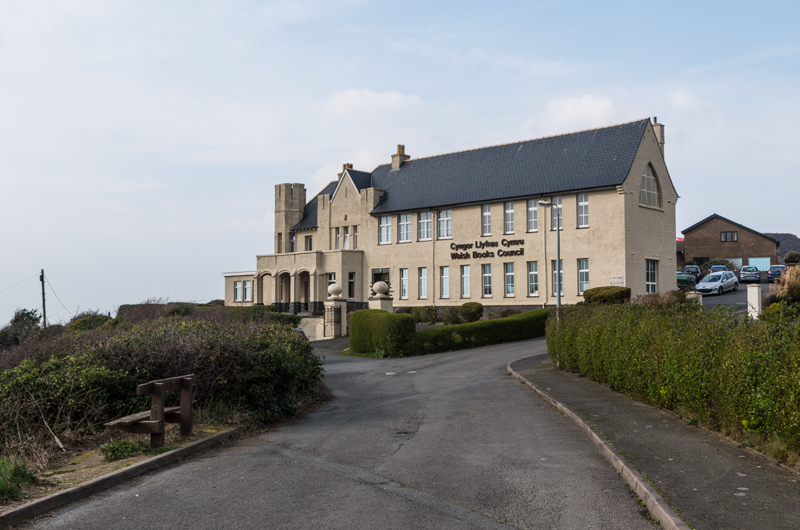
- Welsh Books Council building, formerly St Mary's College
- St Mary's College, Aberystwyth
- 52°25′12″N 4°04′51″W
- Location: Aberystwyth
- Country: Wales
- Denomination: Catholic

History
- Founded: 1904; 122 years ago
- Founder: Francis Mostyn
- Dedication: Blessed Virgin Mary
- Events: Reopened in Aberystwyth 1936

Architecture
- Functional status: Closed
- Closed: 1970

St Mary's College (Welsh: Coleg Mair) was a Roman Catholic seminary in Aberystwyth, Wales, in the United Kingdom. It was the only Roman Catholic diocesan seminary founded in Wales. Also, as it trained priests in the Welsh language, it was the only post-reformation Roman Catholic college of its kind. It was founded in 1904 in Holywell and moved to Aberystwyth in 1936. It was closed in 1970 and now houses the Welsh Books Council.

== History ==
=== Foundation ===
In 1895, the Vicar Apostolic of the Wales was created and the first bishop was Francis Mostyn. He wanted a Welsh diocese to have a Welsh bishop and a bilingual clergy so he sought a college that would train future priests in the Welsh language.

In 1904, he opened St Mary's College (Coleg Mair) in Holywell. From 1908 to 1910, John Hugh Jones worked there, translating various religious writings into Welsh. The college lasted for 30 years before it closed because of a lack of finances.

=== Reopening ===
In 1936, the Bishop of Menevia, Michael McGrath invited the Carmelites to reopen the college in Aberystwyth and staff the local church of Our Lady of the Angels and St Winefride. It was established in Aberystwyth by Fr Pat Geary O.Carm, who went on to become the Superior of the Carmelites in England and Wales. One noted teacher there from 1936 was Saunders Lewis, he worked with Fr Geary, and one of their pupils was the poet John Fitzgerald. Another student was Daniel Mullins who came to the college in 1944, learned Welsh at the college and became the Bishop of Menevia in 1987.

After World War II, the Carmelites realised that an expansion was needed, so some of the staff and students were moved to set up a minor seminary in Tregib Manor in Llandeilo and the college in Aberystwyth was to become focussed on the training of mature students for the priesthood. In 1966, the college in Llandeilo was sold and the building was demolished soon after. In 1970, St Mary's College was also closed and the building was bought by the Welsh Books Council who continue to reside there. In 2004, the Carmelites moved from Our Lady of the Angels Church in Aberystwyth to Our Lady Queen of Peace Church in Llanelli.

== See also ==
- Roman Catholicism in Wales
