= St Joseph's Church, Port Talbot =

Church in Port Talbot, Wales

St Joseph's Church
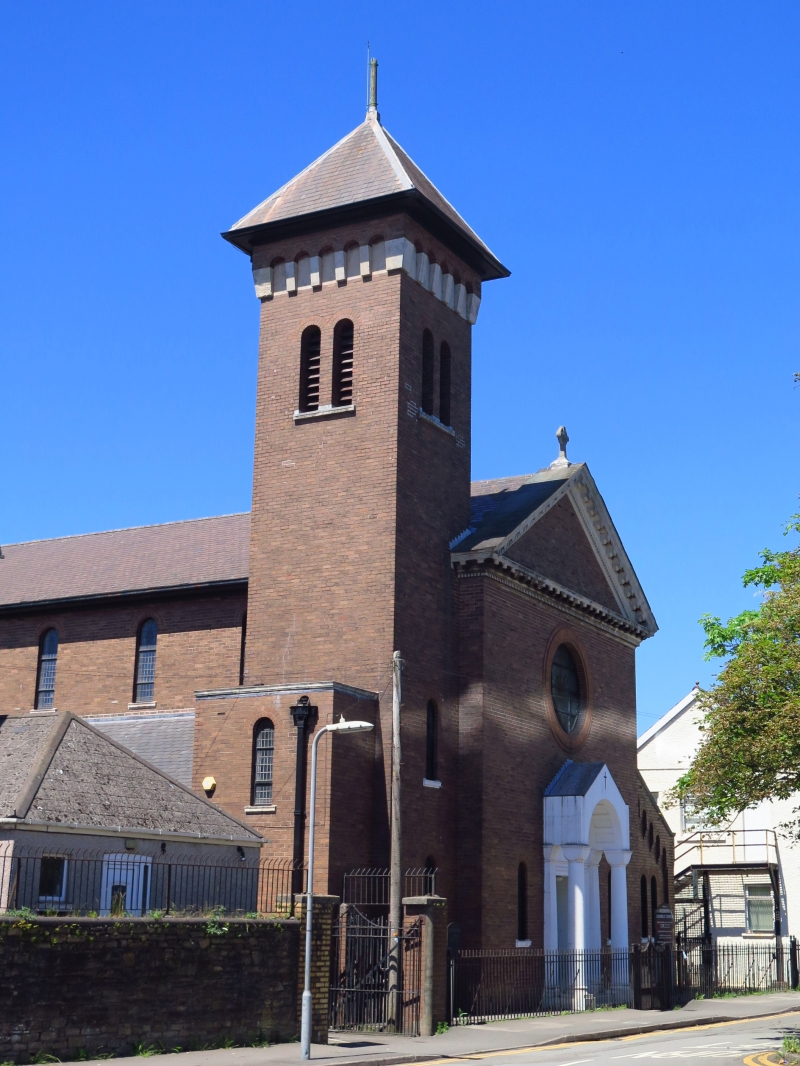
- St Joseph's Church
- 51.5952°N 3.7884°W
- Location: Aberavon, Port Talbot
- Country: Wales
- Denomination: Roman Catholic
- Website: StJosephs-PortTalbot.co.uk

History
- Status: Parish church
- Founder: Benedictines
- Dedication: Saint Joseph

Architecture
- Functional status: Active
- Heritage designation: Grade II listed
- Designated: 31 January 2000
- Architect: Cyril Bates
- Style: Romanesque Revival
- Groundbreaking: 11 September 1930
- Completed: 29 October 1931

Administration
- Province: Cardiff-Menevia
- Archdiocese: Cardiff-Menevia
- Deanery: Port Talbot
- Parish: St Joseph's

St Joseph's Church is a Roman Catholic parish church in Aberavon, Port Talbot, Wales. It was built from 1930 to 1931 for the Benedictines in the Romanesque Revival style. It is located on Water Street on the west side of the River Afan. It is a Grade II listed building.

== History ==
=== Foundation ===
In 1849, a mission was started to serve the Catholic population of Aberavon. The priest was the Benedictine Fr Charles Kavanagh; he came from St David's Priory Church in Swansea. Various locations in the area were used as a chapel, such as a Baptist Chapel, Capel Moria, from 1852 to 1860. From 1860 to 1862, Fr Edward Glassbrook served the mission. During that time, a church that also housed a school was built on the site of the current church. The architect and builder was a local, John King. From that church Fr Glassbrook went out and founded missions in the surrounding area. Some of those missions grew and went on to become churches in their own right, such as Our Lady and St Patrick Church in Maesteg. On 17 February 1863, the parish cemetery opened. In 1870, a separate school was built next door. In 1905, Fr Philip Kelly was the priest and a larger presbytery was built next to the church. In 1928, a parish hall was built. The total cost of the parish hall was £3,000.

=== Construction ===
On 11 September 1930, the foundation stone for the current church was laid by the Archbishop of Cardiff, Francis Mostyn. The architect was Cyril Bates, who also built St Patrick's Church in Newport and St Joseph's Church in Cardiff. He designed the church to be in the Romanesque Revival style. The total cost was £12,864. On 29 October 1931, the church was opened by Archbishop Mostyn.

== Parish ==
St Joseph's Church is its own parish. At some point after the church's construction, the Benedictines handed over the parish to the Diocese of Menevia. Every weekend the church has Masses at 6:00pm on Saturday and at 8:30am and at 10:00am on Sunday.
