= Our Lady of Ransom and the Holy Souls Church, Llandrindod Wells =

Coordinates: 52.241289°N 3.384704°W

Our Lady of Ransom and the Holy Souls Church
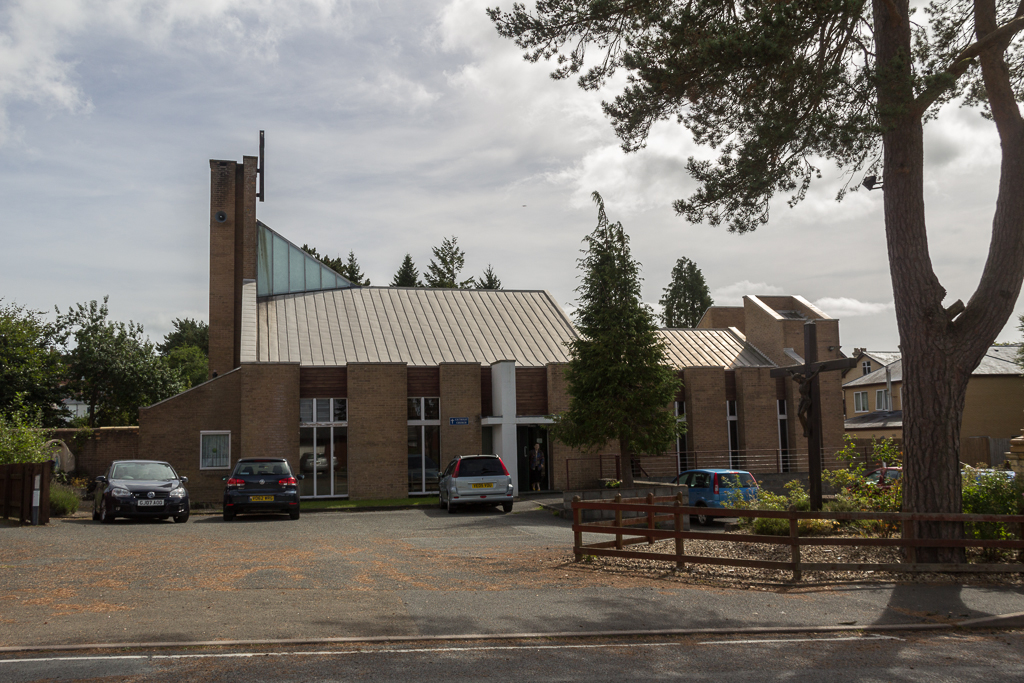
- Front entrance

- Location in Powys
- Location: Llandrindod Wells, Powys
- Country: Wales
- Denomination: Roman Catholic

History
- Founder: Society of Jesus
- Dedication: Virgin of Mercy
- Events: Founded 1907; Rebuilt 1972

Administration
- Province: Cardiff-Menevia
- Archdiocese: Cardiff-Menevia
- Deanery: Llandrindod Wells

Our Lady of Ransom and the Holy Souls Church is a Roman Catholic Parish church in Llandrindod Wells. It was founded by the Society of Jesus in 1907. It was rebuilt in 1972. Its original foundation was the only church the Jesuits built in central Wales.

== History ==
The Jesuits came to Llandrindod Wells from St Beuno's College near St Asaph and set up a Mass centre in 1907. Masses were originally held in the old presbytery. The "old presbytery was known as "the upper room" when Fr Barling was its priest.

Later, at some point in the 20th century, the Jesuits handed over the administration of the church to the Diocese of Menevia.

In 1972, a new church was built on Victoria Road, where it still continues to function.

== Parish ==
The church is the centre of the Llandrindod Wells Deanery. It has Sunday Mass at 11:00am.

== Gallery ==
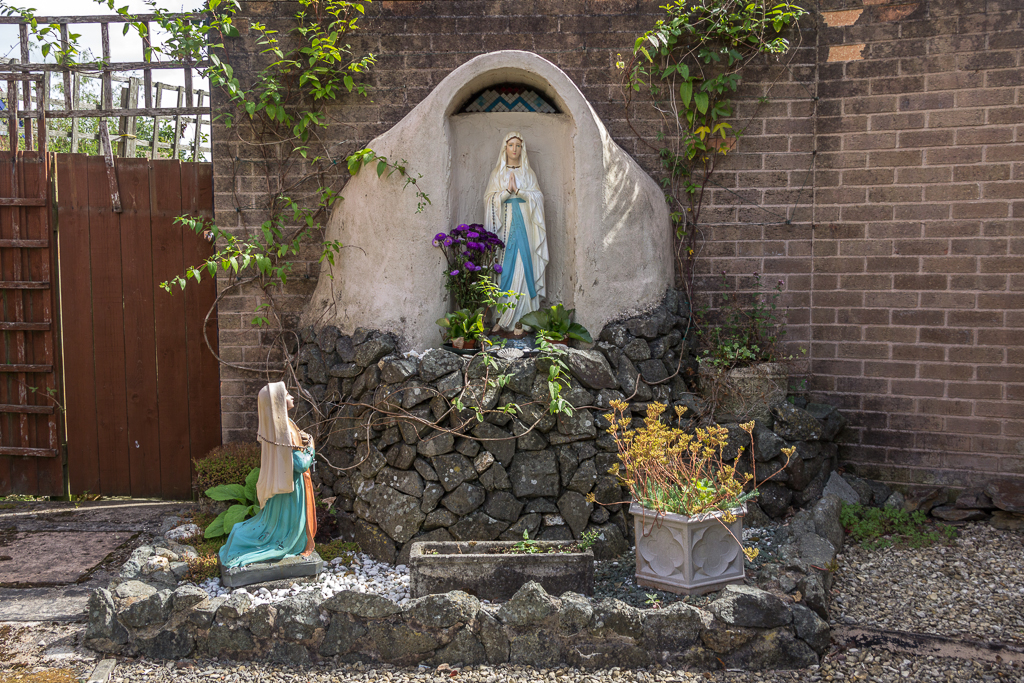
Statue of Mary within the church grounds

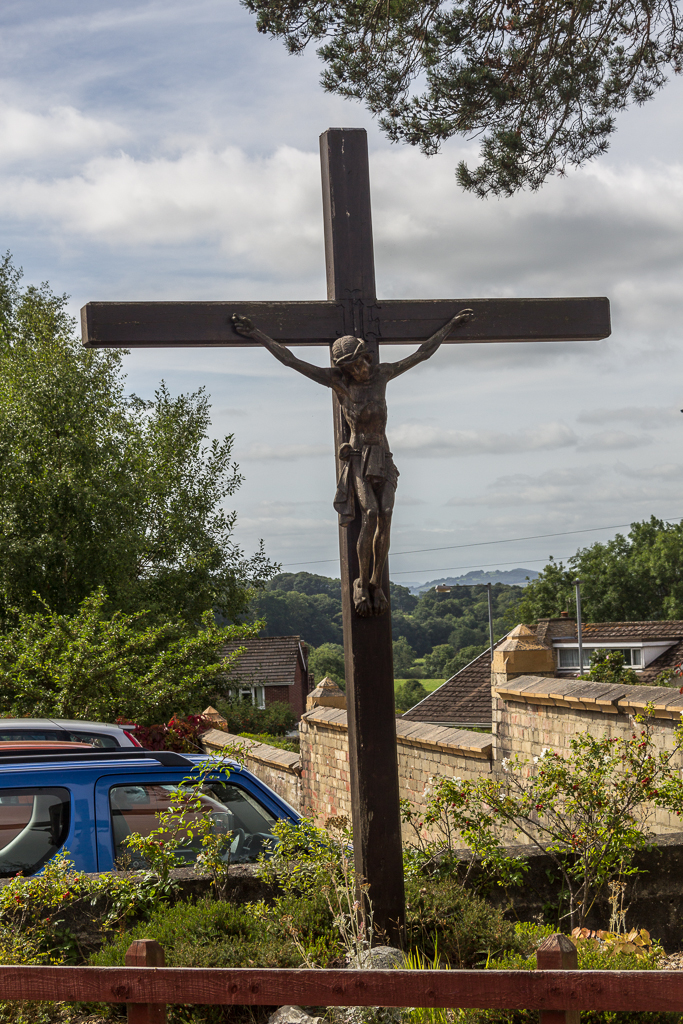
Crucifix with in the church grounds

== See also ==
- St Beuno's Ignatian Spirituality Centre
- Archdiocese of Cardiff-Menevia
