= Archdiocese of Cardiff–Menevia =

Catholic archdiocese in Wales and England

Archdiocese of Cardiff–Menevia Archidioecesis Cardiffensis–Menevensis Archesgobaeth Caerdydd–Mynyw

Catholic
- Coat of arms

Location
- Country: Wales and England
- Territory: South Wales and Herefordshire
- Ecclesiastical province: Cardiff
- Coordinates: 51.600°N 2.946°W

Statistics
- Area: 3,064 km^{2} (1,183 sq mi)
- Population: Total; Catholics: (as of 2019); 1,556,940; 131,280 (8.4%)
- Parishes: 59

Information
- Denomination: Catholic
- Sui iuris church: Latin Church
- Rite: Roman Rite
- Established: 1850 (As Diocese of Newport and Menevia); 1916 (Elevated to Archdiocese of Cardiff)
- Cathedral: St David's Cathedral, Cardiff
- Co-cathedral: St Joseph's Cathedral, Swansea
- Secular priests: 62

Current leadership
- Pope: Leo XIV
- Metropolitan Archbishop: Mark O'Toole
- Vicar General: Paul Watson and Brian Gray
- Judicial Vicar: Matthew Jones
- Bishops emeritus: George Stack; Tom Burns

Map
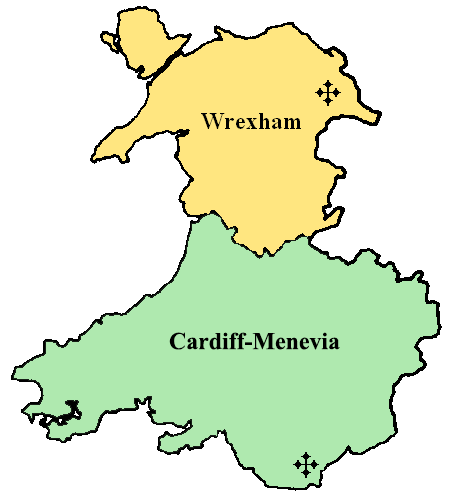
- The Archdiocese of Cardiff–Menevia, shown in green, within the Province of Cardiff.

Website
- rcadc.org

The Archdiocese of Cardiff–Menevia (Latin: Archidioecesis Cardiffensis–Menevensis; Welsh: Archesgobaeth Caerdydd–Mynyw) is a Latin archdiocese of the Catholic Church which covers south Wales and the county of Herefordshire in England. The Metropolitan Province of Cardiff covers all of Wales and parts of England. Its one suffragan diocese is the Diocese of Wrexham.

== History ==
The origin of the modern diocese can be traced to 1840 when the Apostolic Vicariate of the Welsh District was created out of the Western District of England and Wales. The Welsh District consisted of the whole of Wales and the English county of Herefordshire. When Pope Pius IX judged that the time was right to re-establish the Catholic hierarchy in Wales and England in 1850, the southern half of the Welsh District became the Diocese of Newport and Menevia. It had its pro-cathedral at Belmont Abbey.

Boundaries were redrawn to cover Glamorgan, Monmouthshire and Herefordshire and renamed the Diocese of Newport in 1895. Eleven years later, the diocese became a suffragan of the Archdiocese of Birmingham. In 1916, with no change to boundaries, the bishop was raised to the archbishop status with the see title becoming the Archdiocese of Cardiff. The episcopal seat was St David's Cathedral. Cardiff and Menevia dioceses merge in 2024.

=== Timeline ===
As all of the Roman Catholic dioceses in Wales are part of the ecclesiastical province of Cardiff–Menevia the history of the archdiocese and its suffragan dioceses are intertwined:

- 29 September 1850: Universalis Ecclesiae: The Roman Catholic Church in Wales is split between the Diocese of Shrewsbury in the north and the Diocese of Newport and Menevia in the south.
- 1852: Francis Richard Wegg-Prosser, a landowner in Hereford, converts to Catholicism.
- 15 February 1854: Wegg-Prosser sets about building a church and the foundation stone is laid on his Belmont estate.
- 1857: Construction of the Belmont monastic buildings starts.
- 21 November 1859: Most of it is built and it becomes a Benedictine priory. The abbey continues to be enlarged (chancel extended in 1865).
- 4 September 1860: The cathedral priory is consecrated.
- 4 July 1895: The Diocese of Newport and Menevia splits. Glamorgan, Monmouthshire and Herefordshire become the Diocese of Newport. The rest of Wales, including North Wales from the Diocese of Shrewsbury, becomes the Apostolic Vicariate of Wales.
- 12 May 1898: The Apostolic Vicariate of Wales becomes the Diocese of Menevia with its pro-cathedral in Wrexham.
- 7 February 1916: The Diocese of Newport becomes the Archdiocese of Cardiff and it is decided that St David's Church in Cardiff would become the cathedral.
- 12 March 1920: St David's Cathedral, Cardiff, is officially made the metropolitan cathedral.
- 12 February 1987: The Diocese of Menevia is split. The north becomes the Diocese of Wrexham with its cathedral remaining in Wrexham. The south remains the Diocese of Menevia and sets up Swansea Cathedral.
- 12 September 2024: Pope Francis creates the Archdiocese of Cardiff–Menevia by merging the Archdiocese of Cardiff and the Diocese of Menevia.

== Overview ==
The current ecclesiastical territory of the archdiocese comprises the Welsh principal areas of Blaenau Gwent, Bridgend, Caerphilly, Cardiff, Carmarthenshire, Ceredigion, Merthyr Tydfil, Monmouthshire, Neath Port Talbot, Newport, Pembrokeshire, Rhondda Cynon Taf, Swansea, Torfaen, the Vale of Glamorgan and the part of Powys comprising the historic counties of Brecknockshire and Radnorshire, with the English county of Herefordshire. Altogether there are 61 parishes.

== Bishops ==
=== Ordinaries ===
==== Vicars Apostolic of the Welsh District ====
- Thomas Joseph Brown, O.S.B. (Appointed on 5 June 1840 – Became Bishop of Newport and Menevia on 29 September 1850)

==== Bishops of Newport and Menevia ====
- Thomas Joseph Brown, O.S.B. (Appointed on 29 September 1850 – Died on 12 April 1880)
- John Cuthbert Hedley, O.S.B. (Appointed on 18 February 1881 – from 1895, Bishop of Newport only – Died on 11 November 1915)

==== Archbishops of Cardiff ====
- James Romanus Bilsborrow, O.S.B. (Appointed on 7 February 1916 – Resigned on 16 December 1920)
- Francis Edward Joseph Mostyn (Appointed on 7 March 1921 – Died on 25 October 1939)
- Michael Joseph McGrath (Appointed on 20 June 1940 – Died on 28 February 1961)
- John Aloysius Murphy (Appointed on 22 August 1961 – Retired on 25 March 1983)
- John Aloysius Ward, O.F.M. Cap. (Appointed on 25 March 1983 – Resigned on 26 October 2001)
- Peter David Smith (Appointed on 26 October 2001 – Translated to Southwark on 30 April 2010)
- George Stack (Appointed on 19 April 2011. Installed on 20 June 2011 – 20 June 2022)
- Mark O'Toole (Appointed on 27 April 2022. Installed on 20 June 2022 – 12 September 2024)

==== Bishops of Menevia ====
- Francis Edward Joseph Mostyn † (4 July 1895 – 7 March 1921 appointed archbishop of Cardiff)
- Francis J. Vaughan † (21 June 1926 – 13 March 1935 died)
- Michael Joseph McGrath † (10 August 1935 – 20 June 1940 appointed archbishop of Cardiff)
- Daniel Joseph Hannon † (15 March 1941 – 26 April 1946 died)
- John Edward Petit † (8 February 1947 – 16 June 1972 retired)
- Langton Douglas Fox † (16 June 1972 – 5 February 1981 resigned)
- John Aloysius Ward, OFM Cap † (5 February 1981 succeeded – 25 March 1983 appointed archbishop of Cardiff)
- James Hannigan † (13 October 1983 – 12 February 1987 appointed bishop of Wrexham)
- Daniel Joseph Mullins † (12 February 1987 – 12 June 2001 retired)
- John Mark Jabalé (12 June 2001 – 16 October 2008 retired)
- Thomas Matthew Burns (16 October 2008 – 11 July 2019 retired)
- Mark O'Toole (Appointed 27 April 2022. Diocese merged with the Archdiocese of Cardiff in persona Episcopi. Installed on 23 June 2022)

==== Archbishops of Cardiff–Menevia ====
- Mark O'Toole (12 September 2024 – present)

=== Coadjutor Bishops of Menevia ===
- John Peter Mark Jabalé, O.S.B. (2000–2001)
- John Aloysius Ward, O.F.M. Cap. † (1980–1981)

=== Auxiliary Bishops of Cardiff ===
- John Edward Cuthbert Hedley, O.S.B. (1873–1881), appointed Bishop here
- Daniel Joseph Mullins (1970–1987), appointed Bishop of Menevia

=== Auxiliary Bishop of Menevia ===
- Langton Douglas Fox † (1965–1972), appointed Bishop of Menevia.

=== Other priests of this diocese who became bishops ===
- Peter Malcolm Brignall (priest here, 1978–1987), appointed Bishop of Wrexham, Wales in 2012
- Peter Collins (bishop), appointed Bishop of East Anglia in 2022
- Daniel Joseph Hannon, appointed Bishop of Menevia in 1941
- David James Mathew, appointed auxiliary bishop of Westminster in 1938
- Edwin Regan, appointed Bishop of Wrexham in 1994
- Francis John Vaughan, appointed Bishop of Menevia in 1926

== Deaneries ==
There are a total of eleven deaneries in the archdiocese, each of which cover several churches in that area, overseen by a dean.

The deaneries include:

- Bridgend Deanery
- Cardiff Deanery
- Carmarthen Deanery
- Hereford Deanery
- Llandrindod Wells Deanery
- Newport Deanery
- North Gwent Deanery
- Pembroke Deanery
- Pontypridd Deanery
- Port Talbot Deanery
- Swansea Deanery

== See also ==
- List of Catholic churches in the United Kingdom
