= Wrexham Cemetery =

Garden cemetery in Wrexham, Wales

- Mynwent Wrecsam (Welsh)
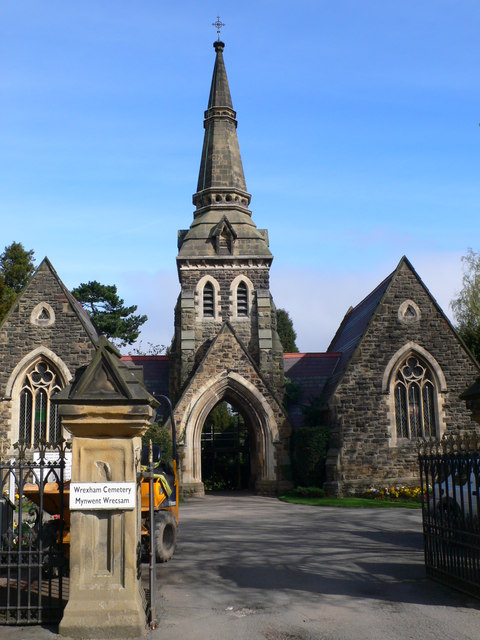
- The cemetery's chapel, at its main entrance.
- Interactive map of Wrexham Cemetery

Details
- Established: 3 July 1876
- Location: Offa, Wrexham, Wales
- Coordinates: 53.039°N 3.006°W
- Type: City
- Style: Gardenesque
- Owned by: Wrexham County Borough Council
- Size: 7.2 ha (18 acres)
- No. of graves: 39,000 (burials)
- Website: wrexhamcemeterystories.com
- Find a Grave: Wrexham Cemetery

Cadw/ICOMOS Register of Parks and Gardens of Special Historic Interest in Wales
- Official name: Wrexham Cemetery
- Designated: 1 February 2022
- Reference no.: PGW(C)67(WRE)
- Listing: Grade II

Listed Building – Grade II
- Official name: Lodge to Cemetary
- Designated: 31 January 1994
- Reference no.: 1808

Listed Building – Grade II
- Official name: Gate Piers to Cemetary
- Designated: 31 January 1994
- Reference no.: 1809

Listed Building – Grade II
- Official name: Gate to Cemetary
- Designated: 31 January 1994
- Reference no.: 16485

Listed Building – Grade II
- Official name: Cemetey Chapels
- Designated: 31 January 1994
- Reference no.: 1807

Listed Building – Grade II
- Official name: Mortuary at Wrexham Cemetery
- Designated: 25 June 2020
- Reference no.: 87790

Wrexham Cemetery (Welsh: Mynwent Wrecsam) is a Victorian garden cemetery in Wrexham, North Wales, which served as the main burial site for the city.

It opened in 1876, laid out to the park-like designs of Yeaman Strachan, whilst its grade II-listed chapels and lodge were designed by William Turner. The cemetery was conceived to serve as Wrexham's unofficial first park, with graves initially arranged by social class, a layout now confined to the Victorian section. It contains memorials dedicated to servicemen from the World Wars, including a dedicated Polish servicemen's memorial. It was also one of the first sites in Wrexham to permit the burial of nonconformists, as it was not directly associated with any established church. The cemetery is listed on the Cadw/ICOMOS Register of Parks and Gardens of Special Historic Interest in Wales.

It was extended in 1890 and again by the 1960s, which form its modern (non-Victorian) sections. It underwent a refurbishment between 2016 and 2018, but new burial plots have since been restricted owing to limited space. A World War II mortuary, the only one of its kind in North Wales, was rediscovered on the site in 2019.

== History ==
The earliest record of the site on which the cemetery now stands dates from 1535, when it was mentioned in the Valor Ecclesiasticus, a survey of the finances of the Church of England carried out under Henry VIII following the Acts of Supremacy. Part of the site was known as Cae'r Cleifion (Welsh for 'the field of the sick'). It was also referred to in an 1840 lease from the Bishop of St Asaph as Terra Leprosorum (Latin for 'The Lepers' Land').

By the 19th century, Wrexham was in need of a new cemetery, the graveyard of St Giles' Church having been filled to capacity by the end of the 18th century.

In 1868, Wrexham Borough Council recognised that a new cemetery was required, although it initially experienced difficulty in securing a suitable site. In 1874, 2.0 hectares (5 acres) of land was purchased to the north of Ruabon Road. Unlike existing graveyards, which were attached to established churches, the new cemetery was to permit nonconformist burials, as it was not directly associated with any one denomination. The original 2.0 hectares (5 acres) was divided equally between nonconformists, Roman Catholics and Anglicans.

The cemetery was laid out between 1874 and 1876, opening in the latter year, to the design of the local nurseryman Yeaman Strachan, who later served as mayor. It was conceived to function as a park. Additional land for the cemetery's extension was purchased to the east, up to Empress Road, in 1886, and the grounds had been enlarged by 1890. The cemetery was also extended westwards beyond Wat's Dyke, and continued to be extended in that direction until it reached its present western boundary by the 1960s. Strachan continued to manage the grounds after the cemetery opened, and upon his death was buried within it. The first burial was that of an eleven-year-old girl, Ethel Irene Prichard, in April 1876; she was possibly from a wealthy family, members of which were later interred alongside her. Her burial took place before the cemetery was fully completed and consecrated. It was formally opened and consecrated by the Bishop of St Asaph on 3 July 1876. At the time of its opening, Wrexham was said to have lacked a public open space of its own, and the cemetery was consequently described as "in effect Wrexham's first park".

The cemetery's mortuary was constructed in the 1930s. In 1994, Cadw designated the chapels as Grade II-listed buildings.

By 1999, the western chapel, situated to the left of the cemetery entrance, remained in use as a chapel, whilst the eastern chapel, to the right, served as a gravedigger's store.

In 2016 and 2017, restoration works were carried out at the cemetery using £1.2 million in funding from the National Lottery Heritage Fund. The works followed calls for renovation that had been made since 2014; the cemetery had been placed on the council's At Risk Register and was closed prior to the commencement of the restoration. The restoration involved the removal of some trees, notably poplars and cypresses, a number of which were replaced by the following winter. The chapel, footpaths and several key monuments were also refurbished, with the chapel itself being fully restored. The cemetery reopened in July 2018.

Since 2017, the western chapel has been used for services, events and educational purposes, whilst the eastern chapel houses the cemetery's reception and research area. The lodge is privately rented.

In 2019, the cemetery's World War II mortuary was discovered in an overgrown state. It has been suggested that it could become a tourist attraction owing to its state of preservation and the fact that it is the "only one of its kind to survive in north Wales".

Although the last burial at the cemetery has "not yet taken place", current burials are largely confined to existing family graves or pre-purchased plots, with the cemetery's burial registers recording interments from 1876 to 2016. All records are held in a database at the Pentrebychan Crematorium office and the cemetery office. Only a limited number of plots remained at the cemetery by the time its replacement, a new burial ground on Plas Acton Lane in Pandy, opened in 2009.

In March 2024, the cemetery's maintenance group, the Friends of Wrexham Cemetery, organised an Easter egg hunt in the grounds with the aim of encouraging local people, particularly the young, to take an interest in genealogy and to visit the cemetery. Following a public backlash over the staging of such an event in a cemetery, however, the hunt was cancelled "to safeguard the young people" expected to take part.

In July 2024, the cemetery was awarded the Green Flag Award.

== Description ==
The Victorian cemetery occupies a rectangular site on the western outskirts of Wrexham, bounded by the B5099 and A5152 roads and, to the west, by the Great Western Railway (now the Shrewsbury–Chester line). It is set on gently undulating ground. Housing borders the cemetery to the south and east, a college lies to the north, and an industrial estate adjoins its western side. Wat's Dyke, a scheduled monument, traverses the cemetery along one of its internal paths and originally marked the western boundary of the grounds.

The cemetery, which covers an area of 7.2 hectares (18 acres), is the principal burial site for Wrexham. It can be divided into two distinct sections, a Victorian section and a more modern section, separated by internal access paths.

Since the cemetery opened in 1876, over 39,000 burials have been carried out on the site, at a rate of approximately 100 per year. As of 2023, however, no new graves are opened there; burials now take place at the Plas Acton Lane cemetery, which opened in 2009 near Pandy. The original extent of the cemetery, measured from a point behind the chapel, was 4.0 hectares (10 acres).

The cemetery was laid out as a public garden, with a network of curved and straight paths. It contained ornamental trees and shrubs, both coniferous and deciduous, including poplars, limes, acacia, horse chestnut, ash, oak, beech, weeping willow, cherry, pine, yew, and cypress. The grounds are laid to grass, with older graves being kerbed, whilst newer sections are arranged in rows. The cemetery was designed by Yeaman Strachan, who adopted the "Gardenesque style" of John Claudius Loudon, employing geometric and symmetrical planting. Its pathways were intended to allow visitors to "tak[e] the air", a common leisurely outdoor pursuit of the Victorian era.

The layout of the cemetery reflected the social class of the deceased, a hierarchy that was deeply significant during the Victorian era. First-class graves were positioned to face, and lie perpendicular to, the pathways, or to occupy high ground or prominent corners. They typically took the form of large memorials, sometimes adorned with statues. Second-class graves were situated directly behind those of the first class, whilst third-class graves occupied the central areas of the sections. The cemetery also contained a number of public graves, usually unmarked or marked only with small headstones, which could accommodate up to twenty burials for families who could not afford a private plot. Over time, as space became increasingly scarce, the orderly arrangement of burials prescribed by the original plan was abandoned, and new interments were placed wherever a plot remained available.

Writing in The Welsh History Review, Rowena Leyland argues, on the basis of Strachan's archived draft plans, that his design for Wrexham Cemetery in the shape of an amphora "ties in with the Victorian desire to create a link to ancient Greece", as opposed to ancient Rome. According to Leyland, this aesthetic allusion to Greece reflects an image of moderation and non-interventionism that the British Empire wished to convey at the time. In the context of British colonialism, she states that Greek aesthetics represented progressivism and restraint, while Roman ones symbolised hegemony and 'assimilation', traits that were increasingly regarded as unfavourable during the Victorian era.

The main entrance stands on the south side of the cemetery, set back from the road. The main and side gates are of cast iron, flanked by stone piers. Immediately inside the gates, a small tarmacked forecourt opens out before two linked Gothic chapels, another element of Turner's design.

The cemetery's chapel, lodge, gates, gate piers and railings were constructed between 1874 and 1876, and are all grade II-listed structures. The cemetery itself is registered as part of the Cadw/ICOMOS Register of Parks and Gardens of Special Historic Interest in Wales.

The Friends of Wrexham Cemetery is a volunteer group established to maintain the grounds.

=== Gates and memorials ===
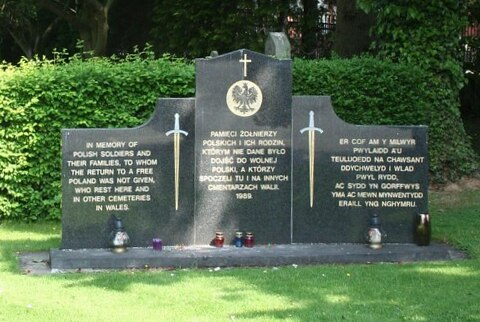
Polish War Memorial in the cemetery

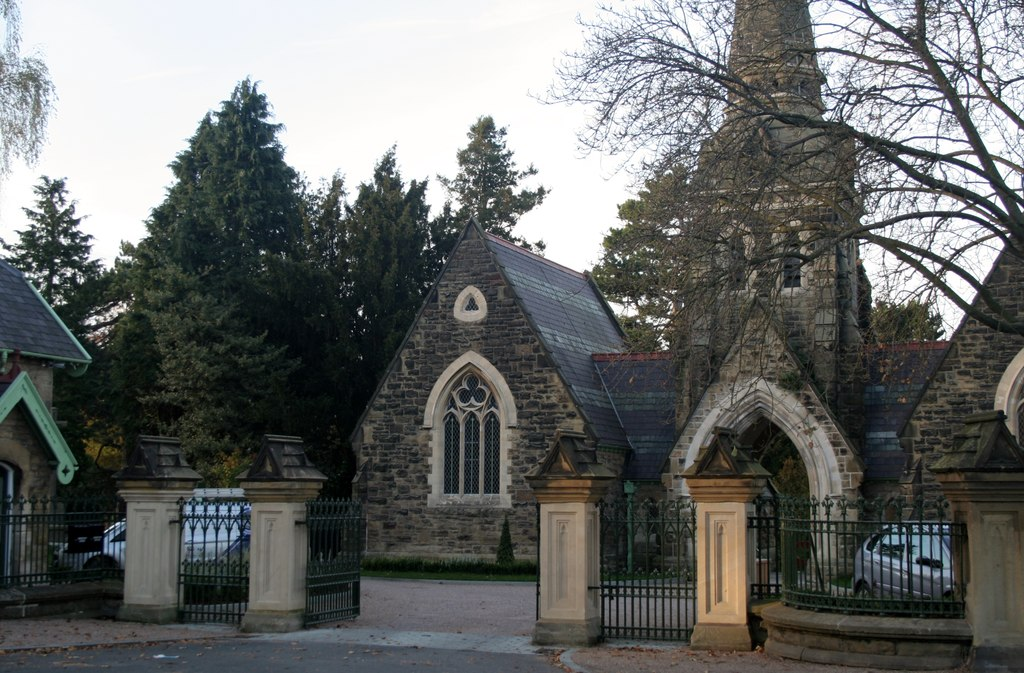
The cemetery's main entrance, with the chapels behind

The gates are aligned with the principal axis of the cemetery's chapels, while the original railings enclose the cemetery from the gates eastwards to Empress Road. The main gates have a pedestrian gate on either side, and are flanked by quadrant railings terminating in piers. It is not certain who designed the railings and gates; they may be attributed to either Yeaman Strachan, the Borough Surveyor of Wrexham who laid out the cemetery, or to William Turner, the architect of the chapels, the lodge and, possibly, the main entrance.

The cemetery's gate piers are of ashlar, and stand on a rusticated stone plinth wall, while the gates and railings are of cast iron. The railings have trefoiled heads and are bordered top and bottom by quatrefoil bands. Terminal piers mark the ends of the quadrant railings that flank the pedestrian gates. The gate piers are similar to the outer piers, which have raking copings and recessed panels enriched with trefoiled spandrels, though the gate piers themselves display trefoiled panels instead. A plainer terminal pier stands at the angle where the boundary meets Empress Road, while simpler stone piers and plain railings with scrolled panels punctuate the boundary at regular intervals along Empress Road.

Two Cross of Sacrifice memorials are dedicated to local casualties interred in the cemetery whilst on active service with the British and Commonwealth armed forces, one for each of the World Wars. The 64 graves associated with World War I are not grouped together but scattered throughout the cemetery; a designated war graves section was not established until World War II. This section, which lies in the south-western corner of the cemetery in Section D, is maintained by the Commonwealth War Graves Commission and contains 100 graves. A further memorial, situated near the cemetery entrance, is dedicated specifically to Polish service personnel who fought alongside British forces in World War II. Wrexham Cemetery is the resting place of 1,200 Poles, 40 of whom were Polish servicemen. Many of the service dead were drawn from the RAF station at Wrexham and the Polish Hospital at Penley; there are also two Belgian service war graves in the cemetery.

=== Chapels ===
The grade II-listed Wrexham Cemetery Chapels stand immediately behind the Ruabon Road gates. Designed by William Turner in the Gothic style and constructed in 1874, they consist of two symmetrical chapels linked by a central archway beneath a tower crowned with a spire. The heavily moulded archway, set within a gable, is placed against the base of the tower, which is supported by clasping buttresses and lit by paired Early English bell chamber openings. The tower carries a heavy broach spire, pierced by two bands of quatrefoils and surmounted by cross finials. The chapels, which follow a long-wall entry plan, are built of random rock-faced rubble with ashlar dressings and terracotta-crested, banded slate roofs. Each chapel is divided into three bays by buttresses, and each bay contains a single foiled light window. Small vestries project from the inner sides of the chapels, while paired windows light the eastern ends. Both chapels also possess a three-light east (liturgical) window filled with geometrical tracery.

The two chapels embody the Victorian cemetery's aim of serving both Anglicans and nonconformists. The western chapel is consecrated for worship by the Church in Wales, while the eastern chapel is Protestant but remains independent of the governance of any established church.

=== Lodge ===
Immediately inside the main entrance to the cemetery stands a small two-storey stone lodge. It was designed by the local architect William Turner. The building originally served as both a residence and an office for the cemetery superintendent. Its exterior is of random rock-faced rubble, with ashlar dressings and a terracotta-crested, banded slate roof crowned by finials. The lodge is laid out in an L-plan, with a gabled porch set in the angle of its left-hand wing. The doorway is shallow and segmentally arched, and the porch gable is adorned with pierced bargeboards. The windows are of three-light timber, mullioned and transomed, with small upper panes on each floor of the left wing, which is capped by a half-hipped roof. Small upper panes also appear in the north-facing gable and at the rear. The lodge has both axial and end-wall chimney stacks. The cemetery office occupies the ground floor, which also contains two reception rooms, while the upper floor provides a bathroom and two bedrooms. The lodge is privately rented.

=== Mortuary ===
The cemetery mortuary is situated at a right angle to, and raised above the level of, Ruabon Road, on the western side of the cemetery entrance gates. It is reached through double-boarded gates set into the cemetery wall. The mortuary is approached across an associated forecourt, bounded on the upper, north side by plain concrete retaining walls and railings, to which concrete steps lead down from the double-boarded gates.

The building is a single-storey brick structure. Its roof is covered in diamond-pattern slates, although some of these have been replaced with similar asbestos-cement substitutes. The front of the building faces east, while the north gable end and the western rear wall are built into a steep slope. All the openings have cambered brick heads, and the windows are furnished with stone sills. The front elevation contains a doorway on the left, possibly originally fitted with double doors, and a two-pane sash window to the right, from which the lower sash is now missing. At the time of the Cadw inspection, both the doorway and the window were protected by steel shutters. A single small window pierces the southern gable end.

The interior of the building is divided into two rooms. The first, entered directly from the main entrance, contains two coffin slabs supported on brick bases, positioned in the corners of the room. The second room houses a ceramic mortuary slab, complete with a drain hole, and a ceramic double-basin fixed to the wall. The floor throughout is of concrete, with integral drainage gullies. Cadw attributed its decision to list the building to its being a rare and remarkably well-preserved example of a mid-20th-century mortuary associated with World War II.

The mortuary was constructed in the 1930s. Although it stands within the cemetery grounds, it was not directly associated with the cemetery itself, having been built to serve the Wrexham and East Denbighshire War Memorial Hospital. Many of the fatalities from World War II, including both British and enemy aircrew, were taken there. After the war, the mortuary was apparently closed, and the building has remained disused ever since. It was largely forgotten until its rediscovery in 2019.

== Notable interments ==
- Henry Dennis (1825–1906), industrialist
- John Eyton-Jones (1862–1940), surgeon and amateur footballer, who played as a Wales international and for Everton
- Francis Vaughan (1877–1935), Roman Catholic Bishop of Menevia from 1926
- Daniel Hannon (1884–1946), Bishop of Menevia from 1931
- Bob Hodgkinson (1902-1982), professional footballer, twice played in League for Wrexham F.C.
- Langton Fox (1917–1997), Bishop of Menevia from 1972 to 1981
- James Hannigan (1928–1994), Bishop of Menevia from 1983 to 1987 and the first Bishop of Wrexham, from 1987
