= Bob Hodgkinson =

English footballer

Personal information
- Full name: Robert Hodgkinson
- Date of birth: 28 August 1902
- Place of birth: Burton, England
- Position: Inside right

Senior career*
Years	Team	Apps	(Gls)
- Loughborough
- Burton All Saints
1924–1925	Wrexham	6	(2)
1925–1926	Oswestry Town		
1926–1927	Wrexham	9	(2)
- Whitchurch
- Llandudno
- * Club domestic league appearances and goals

Robert Hodgkinson (28 August 1902 – 8 September 1982) was an English professional footballer who played as a forward. He made appearances in the English Football League for Wrexham over two spells at the club.

He also played for Loughborough, Burton All Saints, Oswestry Town, Whitchurch and Llandudno.

He is buried in Wrexham Cemetery on Ruabon Road.
