= Bishop of Menevia =

Latin Catholic bishop in Wales

- Bishopric

catholic

Location
- Ecclesiastical province: Cardiff

Information
- First holder: Francis Mostyn
- Denomination: Catholic Church
- Established: 1898
- Dissolved: 2024
- Diocese: Menevia
- Cathedral: St Joseph's Cathedral, Swansea

The Bishop of Menevia was the ordinary of the Diocese of Menevia in the Province of Cardiff in the Catholic Church in Wales.

The Diocese of Menevia covered an area of 9,716 km^{2} (3,751 sq mi) roughly consisting of Carmarthenshire, Ceredigion, Neath Port Talbot, Pembrokeshire, the City and County of Swansea and the ancient counties of Brecknockshire and Radnorshire. The see was in Swansea, where the seat was located at Saint Joseph's Cathedral.

The Vicariate Apostolic of Wales was elevated to diocese status on 12 May 1898. The present territory of the Diocese dates from the restructuring of the Province of Cardiff by Pope John Paul II on 12 February 1987. The seat of Bishop was vacant following the retirement of Rt. Reverend Thomas Burns, S.M. in July 2019. The Diocese was overseen by the Apostolic Administrator The Most Reverend Archbishop George Stack of the Archdiocese of Cardiff. Following Stack's retirement in 2022, Pope Francis appointed Bishop Mark O’Toole as metropolitan archbishop of Cardiff and bishop of Menevia, Wales, uniting the two sees in persona Episcopi.

The estimated Catholic population of the Diocese was 26,266 out of a total population of 788,550 (3.3%).

The diocese was merged in 2024 into the Roman Catholic Archdiocese of Cardiff-Menevia.

== List of the bishops of Menevia and its precursor office ==
=== Vicars Apostolic of Wales ===
Vicars Apostolic of Wales
From	Until	Incumbent	Notes
1895	1898	Francis Edward Joseph Mostyn	Appointed Vicar Apostolic of Wales and Titular Bishop of Ascalon on 4 July 1895 and consecrated on 14 September 1895. Appointed Bishop of Menevia on 14 May 1898 when the district was elevated to a diocese.

=== Bishop of Menevia ===
Bishops of Menevia
From	Until	Incumbent	Notes
1898	1921	Francis Edward Joseph Mostyn	Formerly Vicar Apostolic of Wales (1895–1898). Appointed Bishop of Menevia on 14 May 1898. Translated to the archbishopric of Cardiff on 7 March 1921.
1921	1926	See vacant	
1926	1935	Francis John Vaughan	Appointed bishop on 21 June 1926, consecrated on 8 September 1926, installed on 14 September 1926. Died in office on 13 March 1935.
1935	1940	Michael Joseph McGrath	Appointed bishop on 10 August 1935 and consecrated on 24 September 1935. Translated to the archbishopric of Cardiff on 20 June 1940.
1941	1946	Daniel Joseph Hannon	Appointed bishop on 15 March 1941 and consecrated on 1 May 1941. Died in office on 26 April 1946.
1947	1972	John Edward Petit	Appointed bishop on 8 February 1947 and consecrated on 25 March 1947. Retired on 16 June 1972 and died on 2 June 1973.
1972	1981	Langton Douglas Fox	Formerly an auxiliary bishop of Menevia (1965–1972). Appointed Bishop of Menevia on 16 June 1972. Resigned on 5 February 1981 and died on 26 July 1997.
1981	1983	John Aloysius Ward	Appointed Coadjutor Bishop of Menevia on 25 July 1980 and consecrated on 1 October 1980. Succeeded Bishop of Menevia on 5 February 1981. Translated to the archbishopric of Cardiff on 25 March 1983.
1983	1987	James Hannigan	Appointed bishop on 13 October 1983 and consecrated on 23 November 1983. Translated to the bishopric of Wrexham on 12 February 1987.
1987	2001	Daniel Joseph Mullins	Formerly an auxiliary bishop of Cardiff (1970–1987). Appointed Bishop of Menevia on 12 February 1987. Resigned on 12 June 2001.
2001	2008	Mark John Peter Jabalé, O.S.B.	Appointed Coadjutor Bishop of Menevia and consecrated on 7 December 2000. Succeeded Bishop of Menevia on 12 June 2001. Retired on 16 October 2008.
2008	2019	Thomas Matthew Burns, S.M.	Previously Bishop of H.M. Forces (2013–2022). Appointed Bishop of Menevia on 22 October 2008 and installed on 1 December 2008. Resigned 11 July 2019.
2019	2022	See vacant	
2022	2024	Mark O'Toole	Previously Bishop of Plymouth (2004–2008). Appointed Bishop of Menevia on 22 April 2022 and installed on 23 June 2022. Also appointed Archbishop of Cardiff, thereby merging the two dioceses in persona Episcopi - in the person of the Bishop.
Diocese merged with Cardiff

== See also ==
- Roman Catholicism in England and Wales
