= Llandrindod Wells Deanery =

Roman Catholic deanery in the Diocese of Menevia

The Llandrindod Wells Deanery is a Roman Catholic deanery in the Archdiocese of Cardiff-Menevia, previously in the Diocese of Menevia, that covers several churches in Powys and the surrounding area. In the early 2010s, the Aberystwyth Deanery was dissolved and the churches in Aberystwyth and Aberaeron became part of the Llandrindod Wells Deanery.

The dean is centred at Our Lady of Ransom and the Holy Souls Church in Llandrindod Wells.

== Churches ==
- Our Lady of the Angels and St Winefride, Aberystwyth
- Holy Cross Church, Aberaeron - served from Aberystwyth
- St Michael's, Brecon
- St Joseph's, Hay-on-Wye
- Our Lady of Ransom and the Holy Souls, Llandrindod Wells
- Christ the King, Builth Wells - served from Llandrindod Wells
- St Francis of Assisi Church, Rhayader
- Assumption of Our Lady and St Therese, Presteigne - served from Rhayader
- Our Lady of Perpetual Succour and St Nicholas, Knighton - served from Rhayader

== Gallery ==
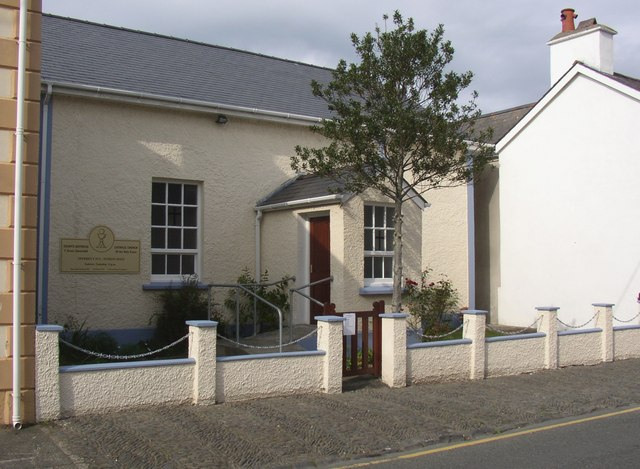
Holy Cross, Aberaeron

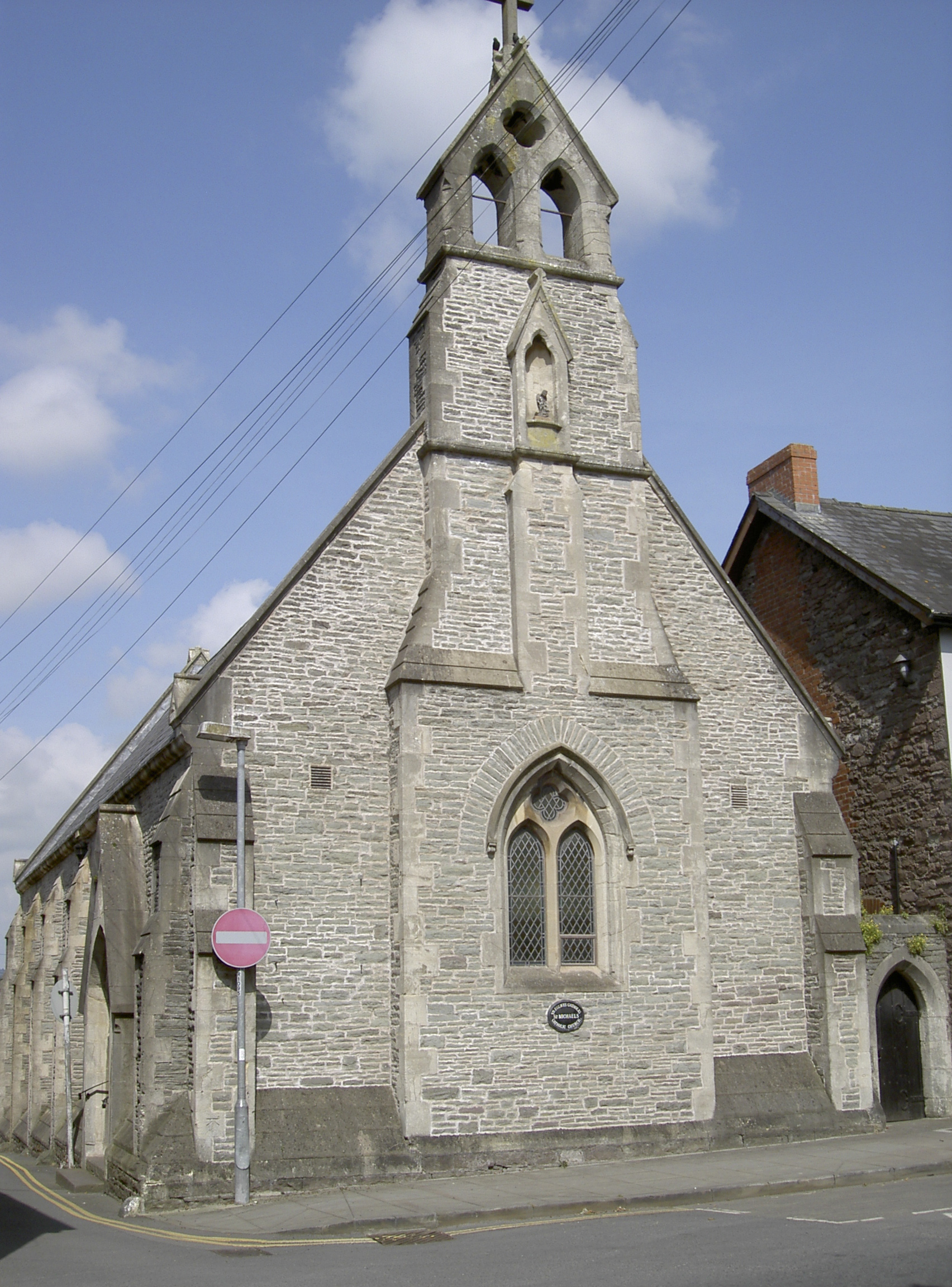
St Michael, Brecon

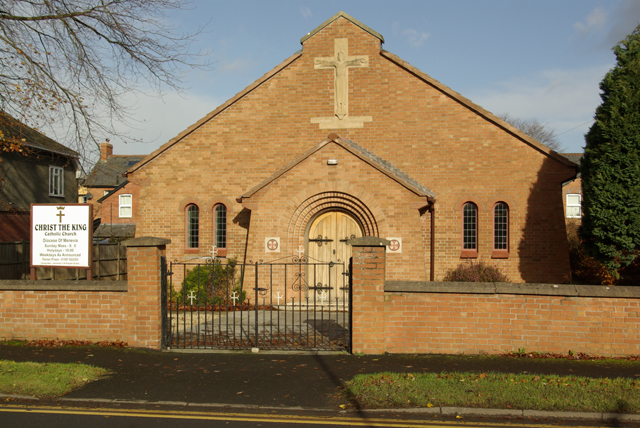
Christ the King, Builth Wells

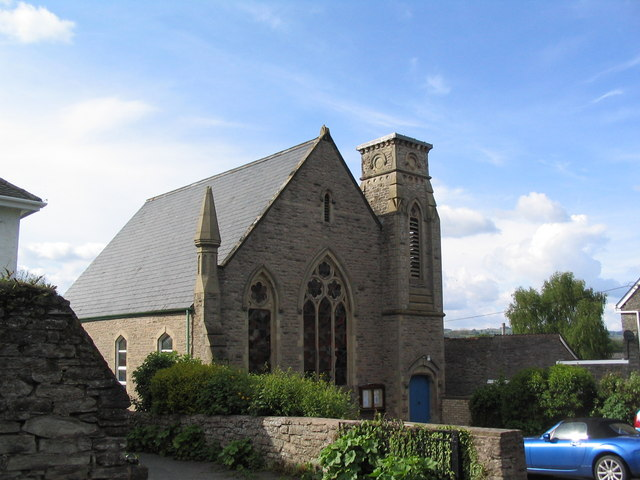
St Joseph Church, Hay-on-Wye

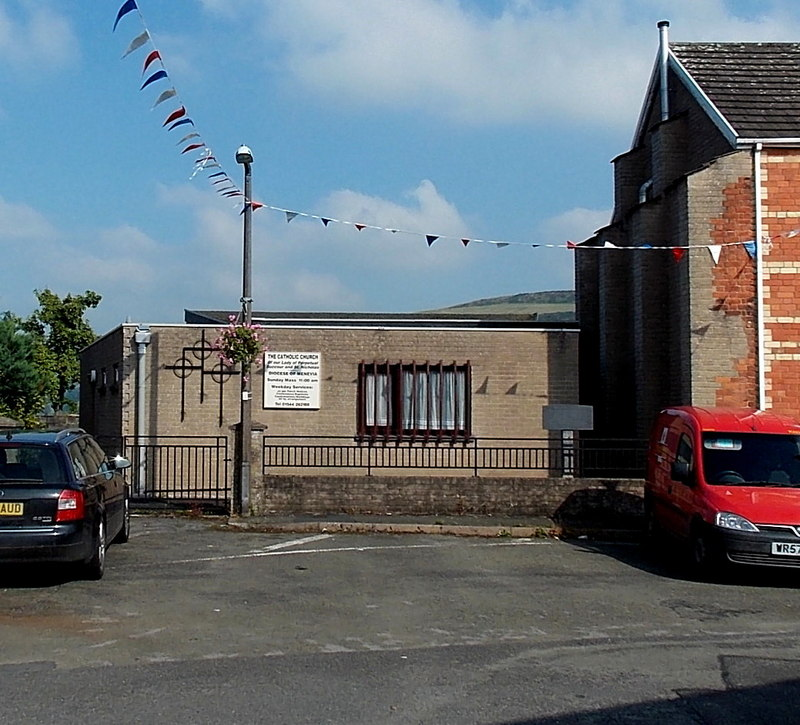
Our Lady of Perpetual Succour and St Nicholas, Knighton

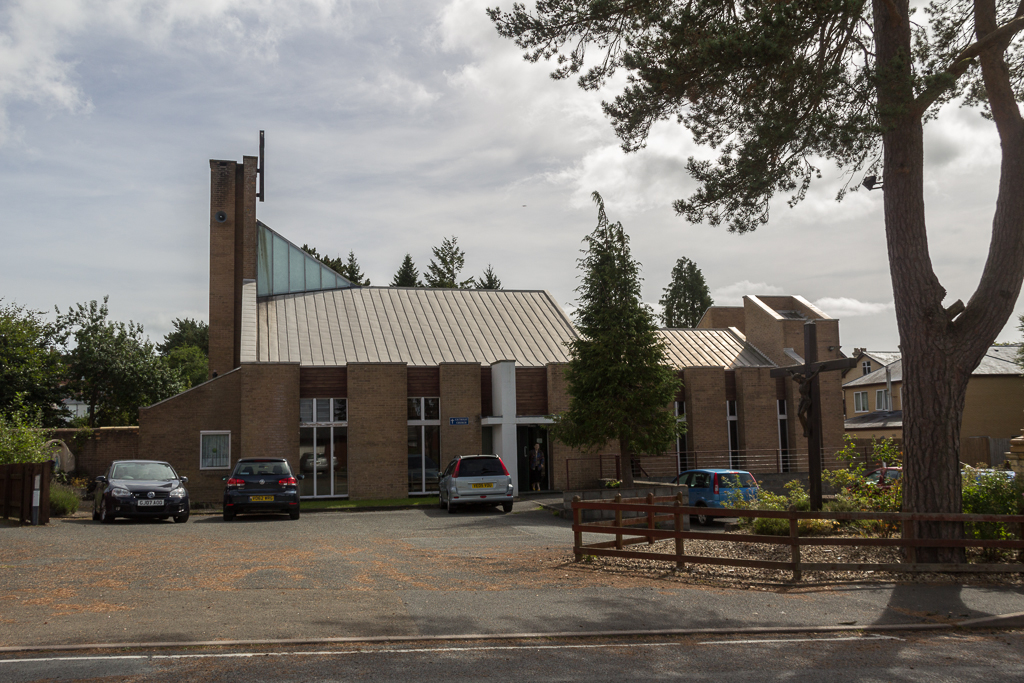
Our Lady of Ransom and the Holy Souls, Llandrindod Wells
