= John Fitzgerald (poet) =

Carmelite friar, priest, poet and philosopher (1927–2007)

Fr John FitzGerald
- Born: John Foster; 1927; England
- Died: 2007 (aged 79–80); London, England

Philosophical work
- Notable works: '

Fr John FitzGerald (1927–2007) was a Carmelite friar, priest, poet and philosopher.

== Life ==
John FitzGerald was a Carmelite friar and priest of Irish parentage, brought up in England, who learned Welsh and made it the language of his religious, intellectual and social life. He was born Michael FitzGerald in Ludlow, Shropshire in 1927 to parents from County Kerry and spent his childhood in Chesterfield and Sheffield.

At the age of 13, he was sent as a boarder to Coleg Mair, a small Catholic seminary housed in Castell Brychan, Aberystwyth where he was taught Welsh by Saunders Lewis, the dramatist and poet who had lost his lecturer's post at University College, Swansea, following an act of arson at an RAF bombing school that was under construction. FitzGerald remained in close touch with Lewis until the latter's death in 1985, dedicating his first book of poetry "i SL am agor drws a ffenestri", "to SL for opening a door and windows".

He published two volumes of verse, Cadwyn Cenedl ("A nation's chain", 1969) and Grawn Gwirionedd ("Grapes of truth", 2006). The second contains all the poems in the first as well as about 30 others and was longlisted for the Welsh Assembly's Literature Prize in 2007. Many of his poems are devotional but he also found inspiration in the nature, people and music. In his obituary in The Independent, Meic Stephens highlights a poem "I'm gwraig" where he purports to address his "wife" although he concludes his poem "Perhaps I should note that I'm not married". According to Meic Stephens, he had 'a talent for writing verse of a very high order'.

In 1942 he joined the Carmelite Order as a novice taking the name John and made his first profession of his religious vows in 1943. He then began higher level studies with the Carmelites in Ireland where he remained until 1948, At University College, Dublin, he began by reading Welsh in the department headed by John Lloyd-Jones who advised him to switch to Greek and Latin and he graduated with a first in Classics in 1946. FitzGerald studied in Dublin for another four years and was ordained priest in 1951. This was followed by a year studying Theology in Rome and a further three reading Classics at Christ's College, Cambridge.

He returned to live in Wales in 1956 and was appointed to the staff of Coleg Mair (by then moved to Tre-gib in Carmarthenshire). Although he had already written poems in English, he now turned to Welsh, working with the Carmarthenshire dialect and mastering the intricate rules of Welsh prosody.

After three years the college was moved to Cheltenham, but FitzGerald remained in Tre-gib until 1964. He was then appointed Chaplain to Catholic students at the University College of Wales, Aberystwyth, and six years later to a lectureship in the Department of Philosophy. When the Philosophy Department at Aberystwyth was closed in 1993 he ceased to teach through the medium of English although continuing to teach philosophy in the Department of Welsh. In 2004, with the closure of their community in Aberystwyth, the Carmelite Order moved him to the post of Prior of Llanelli.

He was the major force in translating the Latin Mass into the Welsh vernacular following the Second Vatican Council. In 1998 he was also a member of the ecumenical panel which produced a new translation of the Bible into Welsh. In addition to Welsh, John FitzGerald learnt Irish and Basque. He translated from Greek both ancient and modern, including Aristotle's Nicomachean Ethics and poems by Sappho and Cavafy.

In literary circles he was known as 'Ieuan Hir' and at 6" 4' (195 cm) he towered over any company. His vows meant that he owned only the most modest of cars and in later years a frequent sight in Aberystwyth was his giant frame implausibly squeezed into the smallest model on the market.
