= St Joseph's Cathedral, Swansea =

Catholic cathedral in Wales

Coordinates: 51.632778°N 3.943889°W

St Joseph's Cathedral
- Cathedral Church of Saint Joseph in Swansea
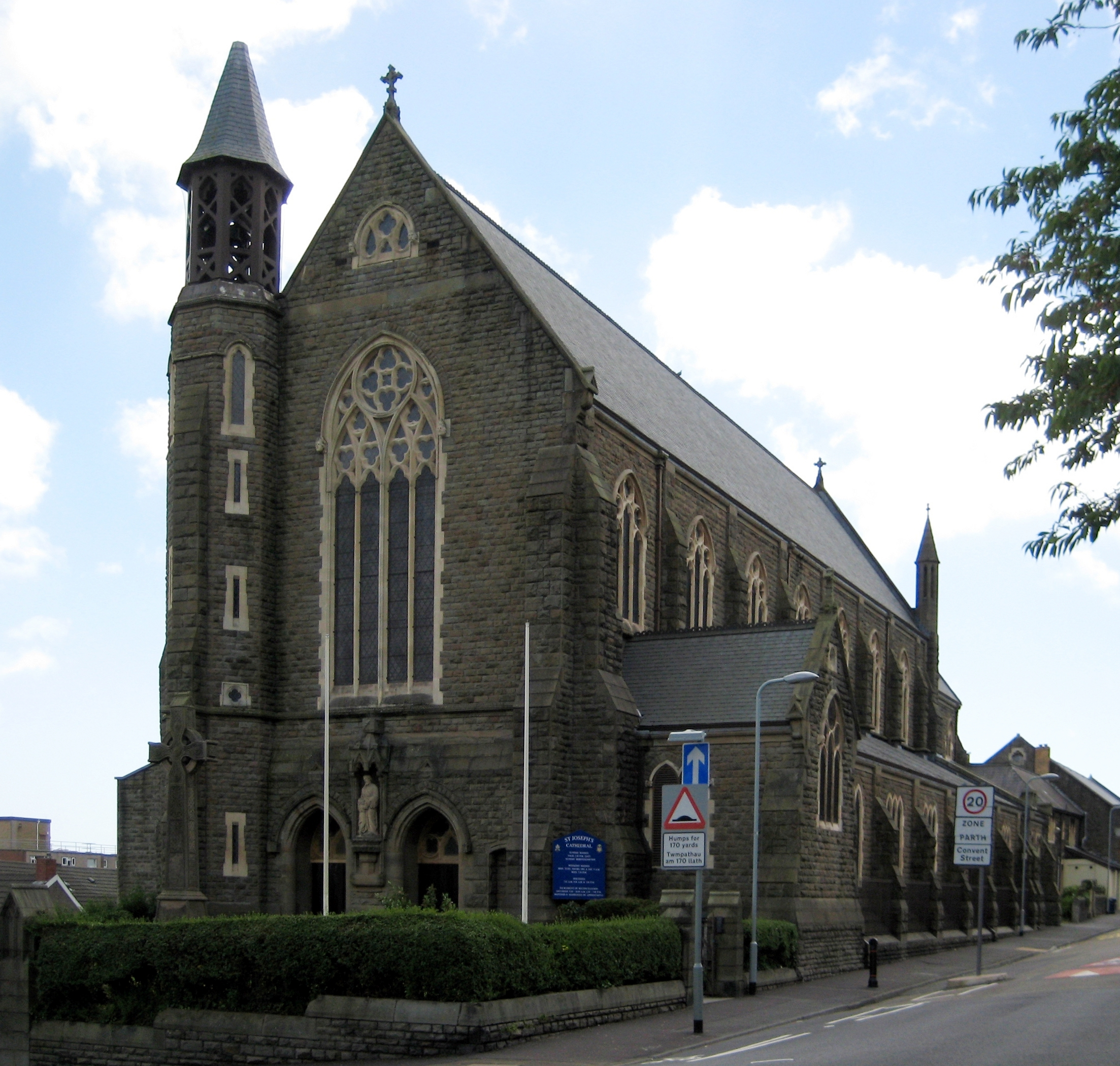

- Shown within West Glamorgan
- Location: Swansea, West Glamorgan
- Country: Wales
- Denomination: Roman Catholic
- Website: MeneviaCathedral.org

History
- Consecrated: 1888

Architecture
- Heritage designation: Grade II listed
- Designated: 30 March 1987
- Architect: Peter Paul Pugin
- Years built: 1887–89

Administration
- Province: Cardiff
- Diocese: Menevia (1987–2024)

Clergy
- Archbishop: Mark O'Toole
- Dean: Rev. Fr. Benedict Koledoye

The Cathedral Church of Saint Joseph, also known as St Joseph's Cathedral, Menevia Cathedral or Swansea Cathedral, is a Grade II-listed Catholic cathedral in Swansea, Wales. It was the seat of the Bishop of Menevia and mother church of the Diocese of Menevia, and is the co-cathedral of the Archdiocese of Cardiff-Menevia. The cathedral was built in the late nineteenth century and is located in the Greenhill area of Swansea.

== History ==
Originally built as a church, St Joseph's was conceived by Father Wulstan Richards, OSB who came to Greenhill in 1875. It was designed by Peter Paul Pugin and took two years to build at a cost of £10,000. The building was officially opened on 25 November 1888 while still under construction. Built as a church, it was converted to a cathedral in 1987 for the redefined Diocese of Menevia. It was designated a Grade II listed building on 30 March 1987.

== Description ==
The plan of the building is that of an apsidal chancel flanked by side chapels with a seven-bay aisled nave, a polygonal tower with spire in the north-west corner and twin porches on the western facade. Its walls are coursed bull-nosed masonry with bath stone dressings and red Dumfries stone in the nave piers and responds. The cathedral has a modern pantile roof and there is a gabled parapet, topped with a finial on the western side of the building above a small arched opening over a four-light Geometric traceried window. The nave has three-light clerestory traceried windows and the east facade has a lower clerestory and a three-light window under a corbelled gable with a finial. The ceiling has radiating ribs that extend to the walls.

== See also ==
- Saint Joseph
