= Port Talbot Deanery =

The Port Talbot Deanery is a Roman Catholic deanery in the Archdiocese of Cardiff-Menevia, previously in the Diocese of Menevia, that covers several churches in Neath Port Talbot and the surrounding area.

The dean is centred at St Joseph Church in Port Talbot.

== Churches ==
- St Therese of Lisieux, Port Talbot
- St Joseph, Port Talbot
- St Philip Evans, Cwmafan - served from St Joseph, Port Talbot
- St Joseph, Cymmer
- Our Lady of Margam, Port Talbot
- St Joseph, Neath
- St John Kemble, Glynneath - served from St Joseph, Neath
- Our Lady of the Assumption, Neath

== Gallery ==
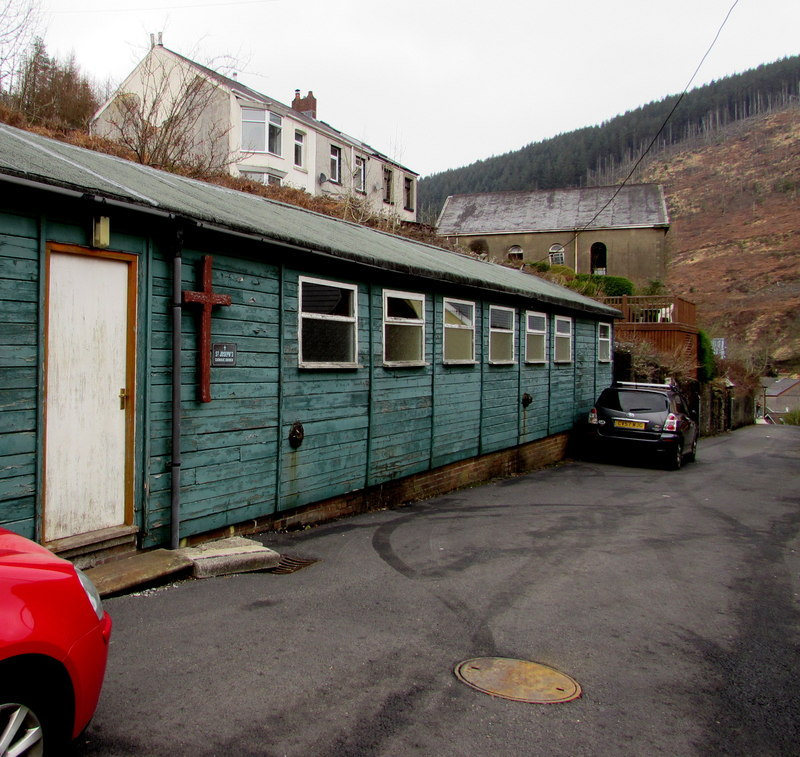
St Joseph Church, Cymmer

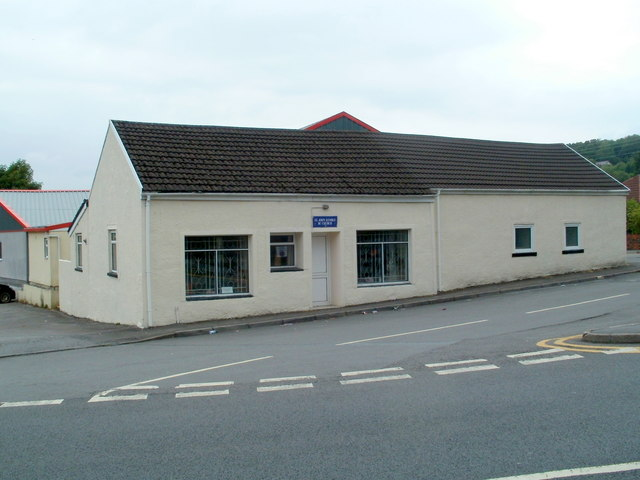
St John Kemble Church, Glynneath

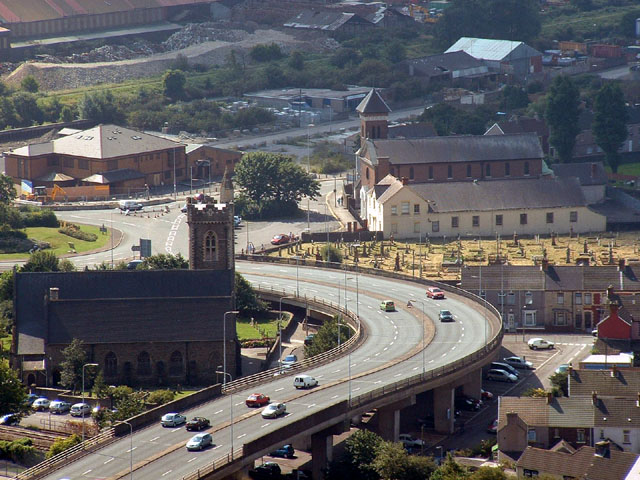
Port Talbot centre, St Joseph Church is on the right

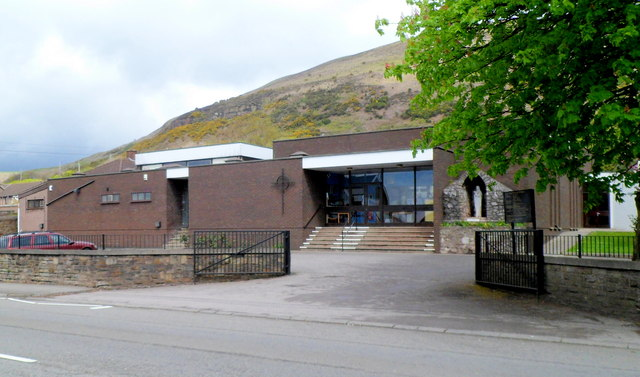
Our Lady of Margam Church, Port Talbot

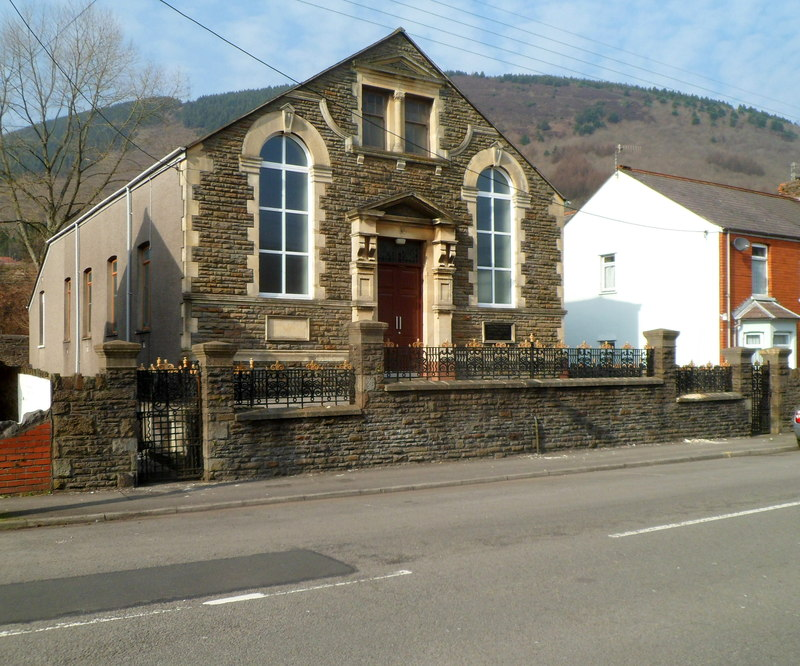
St Philip Evans, Cwmafan
