= Daniel Mullins =

Roman Catholic prelate (1929–2019)

Daniel Joseph Mullins (10 July 1929 – 1 November 2019) was a Roman Catholic prelate who served as the Bishop of Menevia from 1987 to 2001.

== Biography ==
Born in Kilfinane, County Limerick, Ireland, on 10 July 1929, he was ordained to the priesthood on 12 April 1953. He was educated in Mount Melleray Abbey, Waterford, and then St Mary's College, Aberystwyth, where he also learnt Welsh - a rare talent for Catholic priests in Wales-, and also University College Cardiff. He gained a double First-class BA honours degree in Welsh. He studied for the priesthood at St. Mary's Oscott in Birmingham. He was appointed an auxiliary bishop of Cardiff and Titular Bishop of Sidnacestre on 5 February 1970 having previously been mistakenly assigned the already occupied title of Glastonbury. His consecration to the Episcopate took place on 1 April 1970, the principal consecrator was Archbishop John Murphy of Cardiff, and the principal co-consecrators were Archbishop George Dwyer of Birmingham and Bishop John Petit of Menevia. He was appointed the Bishop of Menevia on 12 February 1987. He resigned on 12 June 2001 and assumed the title Bishop Emeritus of Menevia.

He died on 1 November 2019, at the age of 90, in Whitland, Wales.

Catholic Church titles
Preceded by John Aloysius Ward	Bishop of Menevia; 1987–2001	Succeeded by Mark Jabalé
