= James Bilsborrow =

Catholic archbishop

The Most Reverend James Romanus Bilsborrow O.S.B.
- Archbishop of Cardiff
- Church: Roman Catholic
- Archdiocese: Cardiff
- Appointed: 7 February 1916
- In office: 1916-1920
- Predecessor: First Archbishop
- Successor: Francis Mostyn
- Other post: Titular Archbishop of Cius
- Previous post: Bishop of Port-Louis (1911-1916)

Orders
- Ordination: 23 June 1889
- Consecration: 24 February 1911 by John Hedley
- Rank: Metropolitan Archbishop

Personal details
- Born: 27 August 1862 Walton-le-Dale, England
- Died: 19 June 1931 (aged 68)

Styles of James Romanus Bilsborrow
- Reference style: The Most Reverend
- Spoken style: Your Grace
- Religious style: Archbishop

James Romanus Bilsborrow, O.S.B. (27 August 1862 – 19 June 1931) was an English Roman Catholic prelate and Benedictine priest. He served as the first Archbishop of Cardiff (1916–1920), having previously been Bishop of Port-Louis (1916–1920).

Born in Preston, Lancashire on 27 August 1862, he was ordained a priest in the Order of Saint Benedict on 23 June 1889. He was appointed the Bishop of the Diocese of Port-Louis in Mauritius on 13 September 1910. His consecration to the Episcopate took place on 24 February 1911, the principal consecrator was John Cuthbert Hedley, Bishop of Newport, and the principal co-consecrators were Peter Augustine O'Neill, Bishop Emeritus of Port-Louis and Joseph Robert Cowgill, Bishop of Leeds. Six years later, Bilsborrow was appointed the first Archbishop of Cardiff on 7 February 1916.

He resigned the post on 16 December 1920 and appointed Titular Archbishop of Cius. He died on 19 June 1931, aged 68.

Catholic Church titles
Preceded by John Tuohill Murphy	Bishop of Port-Louis; 1910–1916	Succeeded by Peter Augustine O'Neill
New title	Archbishop of Cardiff; 1916–1920	Succeeded by Francis Mostyn
