= Mark O'Toole (bishop) =

21st-century British Catholic bishop

His Grace, The Most Reverend Mark O'Toole
- Archbishop of Cardiff-Menevia
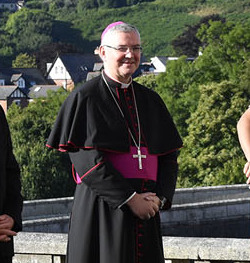
- Archbishop Mark O'Toole in 2017
- Church: Roman Catholic Church
- Archdiocese: Cardiff-Menevia
- Province: Cardiff-Menevia
- See: Cardiff-Menevia
- Appointed: 12 September 2024
- Predecessor: George Stack (Cardiff); Thomas Burns (Menevia)
- Previous posts: Private Secretary to Cardinal Cormac Murphy-O'Connor (2002–2008); Rector of Allen Hall Seminary (2008–2013); Bishop of Plymouth (2013–2022)

Orders
- Ordination: 9 June 1990 by Basil Hume
- Consecration: 28 January 2014 by Christopher Budd

Personal details
- Born: 22 June 1963 (age 63) Lambeth, London, United Kingdom
- Parents: Marcus O'Toole; Maura O'Toole (née McDonagh)
- Motto: In manus tuas, Domine
- Coat of arms

Mark O'Toole (born 22 June 1963) is a British Catholic prelate who has served as Archbishop of Cardiff-Menevia since its formation on 12 September 2024. He had held the two offices of Archbishop of Cardiff and Bishop of Menevia since 2022.

== Early life and education ==
O'Toole was born in Southwark, England, and attended St Ignatius Primary School, Stamford Hill and St Thomas More Secondary school in Wood Green, leaving in 1981 with four ‘A’ levels before going to the University of Leicester, where he graduated with a B.Sc. in geography in 1984.

He commenced his studies for the priesthood at Allen Hall Seminary in Chelsea and was ordained a priest on 9 June 1990 by Basil Hume for the Archdiocese of Westminster at the Church of St Ignatius, Stamford Hill, London.

Between 1990 and 1992 he studied for an M.Phil. in theology at the University of Oxford.

Between 2002 and 2008 he served as the private secretary to Cormac Murphy-O'Connor before his appointment as the rector of Allen Hall Seminary in September 2008.

== Episcopal ministry ==
On 9 November 2013, O'Toole was appointed the ninth bishop of Plymouth by Pope Francis. He received his episcopal consecration on 28 January 2014. He was the first new bishop of England and Wales appointed by Pope Francis.

In O'Toole's homily during the Stella Maris Mass for seafarers on 25 September 2014 in Plymouth Cathedral, O'Toole expressed an affinity with the mission of the Apostleship of the Sea, the Catholic charity that provides pastoral and practical support to all seafarers. He said this was because his grandfather was something of a seafarer and fisherman who owned his own boat and made a living in trading goods and supplies off the West coast of Ireland.

On 27 April 2022, Pope Francis appointed O'Toole Archbishop of Cardiff, succeeding George Stack. At the same time, he named him Bishop of Menevia, thereby uniting the two dioceses in the person of a single bishop. His installation took place in Cardiff Cathedral on 20 June 2022, the feast day of Welsh martyrs Saints Julius and Aaron.

On 12 September 2024, Pope Francis merged the two ecclesiastical jurisdictions O'Toole was leading into the Archdiocese of Cardiff-Menevia, and O'Toole became the first archbishop of that archdiocese.

Catholic Church titles
Preceded by Christopher Budd	Bishop of Plymouth; 2013–2022	Succeeded by None yet
Preceded by George Stack	Archbishop of Cardiff; 2022–2024	Last appointment
Preceded by Thomas Burns	Bishop of Menevia; 2022–2024	Last appointment
New title	Archbishop of Cardiff-Menevia; 2024–present	Incumbent
