= Mark Jabalé =

British Roman Catholic prelate (1933–2025)

The Rt. Revd. Mark John Peter Jabalé O.S.B.
- Bishop Emeritus of Menevia
- circa 2001
- Church: Catholic Church
- Archdiocese: Cardiff
- Diocese: Menevia
- Installed: 11 June 2001
- Term ended: 16 October 2008
- Predecessor: Daniel Joseph Mullins
- Successor: Thomas Burns
- Previous posts: Abbot of Belmont Abbey (1993–2000), Coadjutor Bishop of Diocese of Menevia (2000–2001)

Orders
- Ordination: 13 July 1958
- Consecration: 7 December 2000

Personal details
- Born: John Peter Jabalé; 16 October 1933 Alexandria, Egypt
- Died: 9 May 2025 (aged 91) Belmont Abbey, Herefordshire, England

Mark John Peter Jabalé OSB (16 October 1933 – 9 May 2025) was a British Roman Catholic prelate, who served as Bishop of Menevia. He was installed as bishop on 12 June 2001.

== Biography ==
Jabalé was born in Alexandria, Egypt and was a pupil at Belmont Abbey School. Upon finishing Sixth Form he immediately became a monk at the Abbey and later studied French at university in Switzerland. He continued as a monk at Belmont and began teaching and coaching sport at his old school. He became Headmaster in 1969 and left that role in 1983.

While teaching at Belmont Abbey School, he began coaching rowing, eventually coaching a GB crew to the 1979 World Rowing Championships where his Lightweight Men's Coxless Four won a gold medal. In the late 1970s, he also coached the Oxford University crew in the early stages of a winning streak from 1976 to 1985. In 1985, while actually in Peru himself, he was elected a Steward of Henley Royal Regatta. He remained a Steward, and in 1986 was the first Roman Catholic to preach at St. Mary's, Henley, at the Regatta Service. In 2018, he was the preacher at a service commemorating 200 years of Leander Club.

He became Abbot of Belmont in 1993, and then coadjutor bishop of Menevia from 7 November 2000. Pope Benedict XVI accepted his resignation as Bishop of Menevia on 16 October 2008, Jabalé having reached the upper age limit of seventy-five. He was succeeded by Bishop Tom Burns, formerly Bishop to the Forces.

On 13 March 2009, Bishop Jabalé was inducted as parish priest of Holy Trinity Catholic Church in Chipping Norton, by the Archbishop of Birmingham, Vincent Nichols. In August 2020 he retired from parochial life and returned to reside at Belmont Abbey.

Bishop Jabalé died at Hereford County Hospital on 9 May 2025, at the age of 91.

== See also ==
- Catholic Church in England and Wales
- Diocese of Menevia
- Bishop of Menevia

Catholic Church titles
Preceded by Alan Rees	Abbot of Belmont Abbey; 1993–2000	Succeeded by Paul Stonham
Preceded by Daniel Joseph Mullins	Bishop of Menevia; 2001–2008	Succeeded by Thomas Matthew Burns
