= Langton Fox =

Langton Douglas Fox
- Bishop of Menevia
- Church: Catholic Church
- Diocese: Diocese of Menevia
- In office: 16 June 1972 – 5 February 1981
- Predecessor: John Petit
- Successor: Daniel Hannon
- Previous posts: Titular Bishop of Maura (1965-1972); Auxiliary Bishop of Menevia (1965-1972)

Orders
- Ordination: 30 May 1942 by Peter Amigo
- Consecration: 16 December 1965 by John Petit

Personal details
- Born: 21 February 1917 Golders Green, London, United Kingdom of Great Britain and Ireland
- Died: 26 July 1997 (aged 80) Wrexham, Wrexham County Borough, Wales, United Kingdom

Langton Douglas Fox (21 February 1917 – 26 July 1997) was a Roman Catholic prelate who served as Bishop of Menevia from 1972 to 1981.

== Life ==
Born in Golders Green, London on 21 February 1917, he was ordained to the priesthood on 30 May 1942. In 1945 he was awarded the degree of Doctor of Divinity from Maynooth College (the first English born priest to receive a doctorate from the Irish National seminary). He was appointed an auxiliary bishop of Menevia and Titular Bishop of Maura on 18 October 1965. His consecration to the Episcopate took place on 16 December 1965, the principal consecrator was Bishop John Edward Petit of Menevia, and the principal co-consecrators were Archbishop Cyril Conrad Cowderoy of Southwark and Bishop Thomas Holland of Salford. He was appointed the Diocesan Bishop of Menevia on 16 June 1972. He participated in the fourth, and last, session of the Second Vatican Council, held between 14 September and 8 December 1965.

He resigned on 5 February 1981 and assumed the title Bishop Emeritus of Menevia. He died at Nazareth House in Wrexham on 26 July 1997, aged 80, and was buried in Wrexham Cemetery in Ruabon Road.

Catholic Church titles
Preceded by John Edward Petit	Bishop of Menevia; 1972–1981	Succeeded by James Hannigan
