= Francis Vaughan =

Roman Catholic prelate (1877–1935)

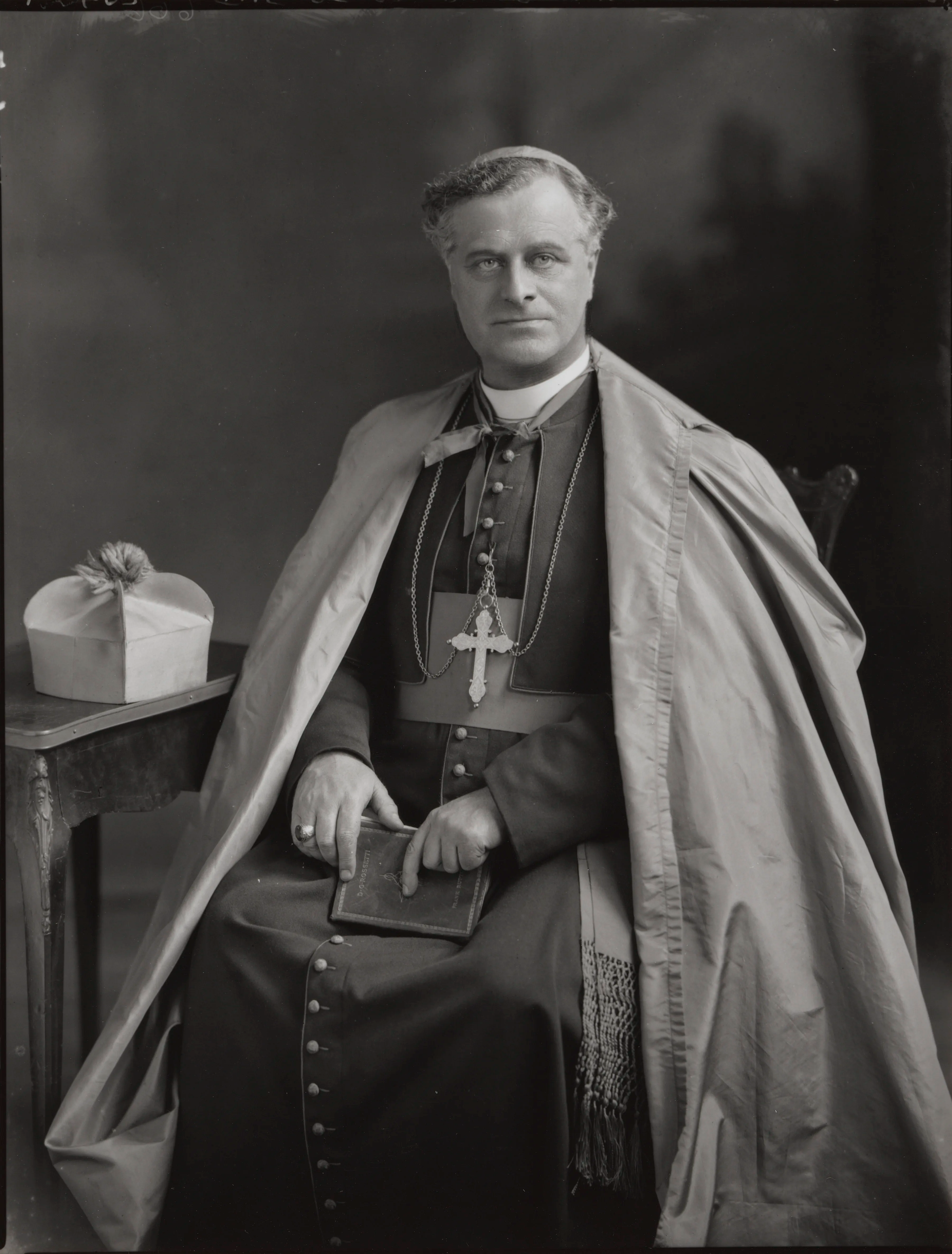
Vaughan in 1929

Francis John Vaughan (5 May 1877 – 13 March 1935) was a Roman Catholic prelate who served as Bishop of Menevia from 1926 to 1935.

Vaughan was born in Courtfield, Welsh Bicknor, Herefordshire. An uncle was Cardinal Herbert Vaughan, Archbishop of Westminster until 1903. Two other uncles from this traditionally Welsh recusant family served as bishops, one as Archbishop of Sydney.

Vaughan was ordained to the priesthood on 5 July 1903. He was appointed the Bishop of the Diocese of Menevia by the Holy See on 21 June 1926. His consecration to the Episcopate took place on 8 September 1926, the principal consecrator was Archbishop Francis Mostyn of Cardiff, and the principal co-consecrators were Bishop Joseph Thorman of Hexham and Newcastle and Bishop Thomas Dunn of Nottingham. He was installed on 14 September 1926.

He died in office at his Bishop's House in Wrexham on 13 March 1935, aged 57, and was buried in Wrexham Cemetery in Ruabon Road.

Catholic Church titles
| Preceded by Francis Mostyn | Bishop of Menevia; 1926–1935 | Succeeded by Michael Joseph McGrath |
