= Tom Burns (bishop) =

British Roman Catholic bishop

The Right Reverend Thomas Matthew Burns SM
- Bishop emeritus of Menevia
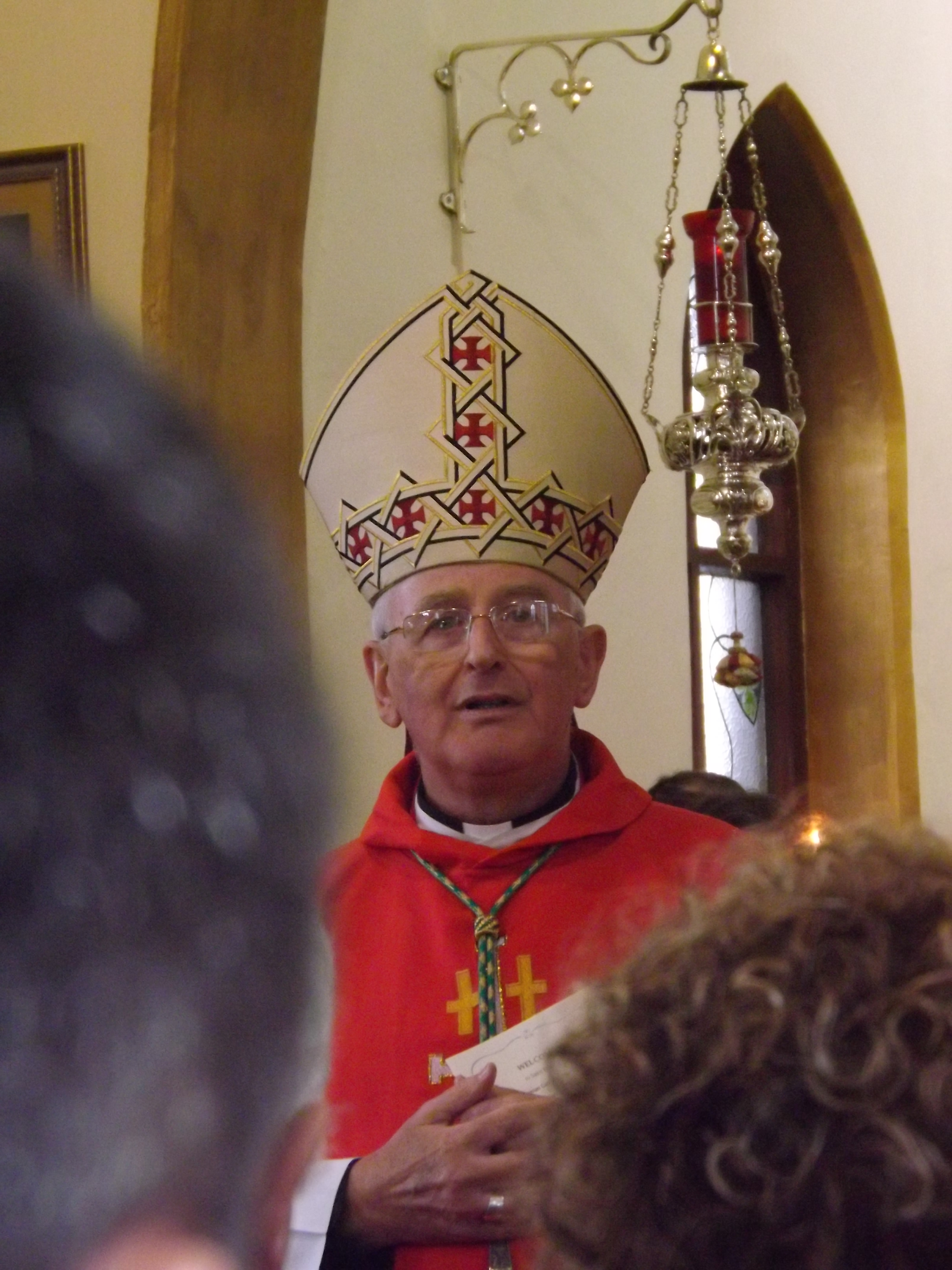
- Bishop Burns in 2013
- Province: Cardiff
- Diocese: Menevia
- Appointed: 16 October 2008
- Installed: 1 December 2008
- Term ended: 11 July 2019
- Predecessor: John Mark Jabalé
- Successor: Mark O'Toole
- Previous post: Bishop of the Forces

Orders
- Ordination: 16 December 1971
- Consecration: 18 June 2002 by Cormac Murphy-O'Connor
- Rank: Bishop

Personal details
- Born: Thomas Matthew Burns; 3 June 1944 (age 82) Belfast, Northern Ireland
- Denomination: Roman Catholic
- Motto: Non ministrari sed ministrare
- Coat of arms

Thomas Matthew Burns SM KC*HS (born 3 June 1944) is a British Roman Catholic bishop. On 16 October 2008, he was appointed Bishop of Menevia by Pope Benedict XVI, becoming so on 1 December 2008 when he took possession of his new see, on which day he ceased to be Bishop of the Forces. He is now bishop promoter for the Apostleship of the Sea, a Catholic organisation that provides pastoral and practical assistance to all seafarers. It was announced in July 2019 that Burns had retired from the role of Bishop of Menevia after 11 years.

== Life and ministry ==
Tom Burns was born in Belfast, but his family later moved to Lancashire. After studying at St. Mary's College, Blackburn, a sixth form in an Exeter school and a monastery in Paignton, Burns was ordained to the priesthood on 16 December 1971 for the Society of Mary.

On 24 May 2002, he was appointed to head the military ordinariate of Great Britain, the Bishopric of the Forces. He received his episcopal consecration on the following 18 June from Cardinal Cormac Murphy-O'Connor, with Bishop Francis Walmsley and Archbishop Patrick Altham Kelly serving as co-consecrators.

Burns has been a vociferous critic of the UK Ministry of Defence, complaining that troops in Iraq were "frustrated by restrictions, checks and delays that are placed on them but not on their opponents", and that their "activities are often jeopardised by poor equipment, outmoded vehicles and inadequate apparel".

The church closure in Aberystwyth has been criticised.

On 11 July 2019, Pope Francis accepted Burns's resignation after he reached the age of 75. A farewell and thanksgiving Mass was held on 23 July 2019 to mark the beginning of his retirement.

Catholic Church titles
Preceded by Francis Joseph Walmsley	Bishop of the Forces; 2002–2008	Succeeded by Richard Moth
Preceded by John Mark Jabalé	Bishop of Menevia; 2008–2019	Succeeded by TBA
