= George Stack =

Irish RC priest (b.1946)

His Grace The Most Reverend George Stack CStJ GC MOC
- Archbishop Emeritus of Cardiff
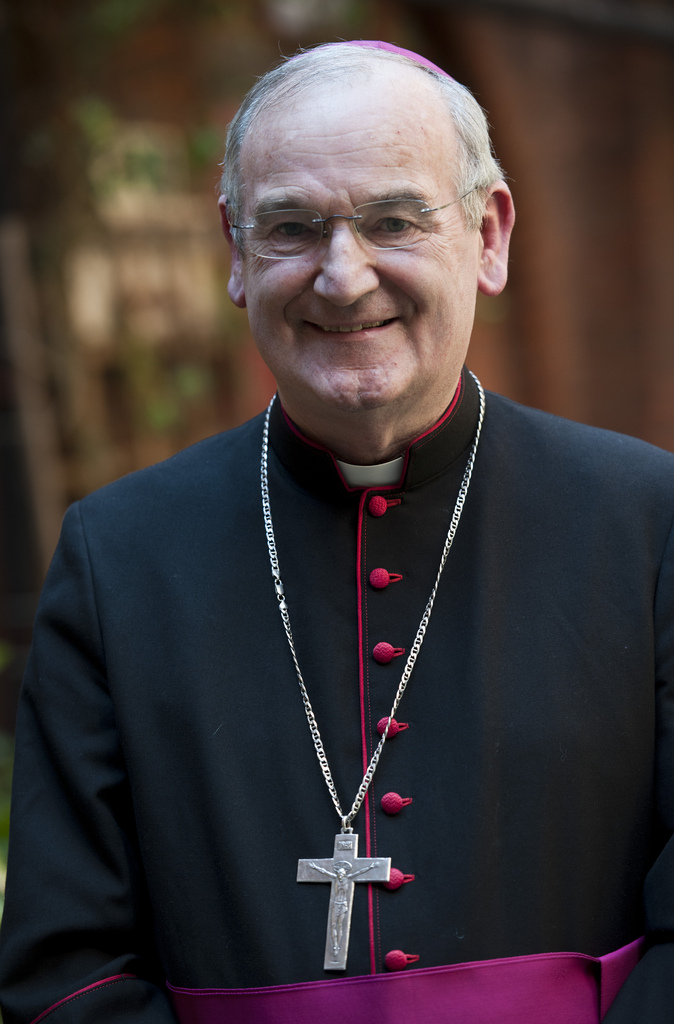
- Archbishop George Stack
- Church: Roman Catholic Church
- Archdiocese: Archdiocese of Cardiff
- Province: Province of Cardiff
- Appointed: 19 April 2011
- Installed: 20 June 2011
- Term ended: 20 June 2022
- Predecessor: Peter Smith
- Successor: Mark O'Toole
- Previous posts: Auxiliary Bishop of Westminster (2001 - 2011); Titular Bishop of Gemellae in Numidia (2001 - 2011)

Orders
- Ordination: 21 May 1972 by Victor Guazzelli
- Consecration: 12 April 2001 by Cormac Murphy-O'Connor
- Rank: Archbishop

Personal details
- Born: 9 May 1946 (age 80) Cork, Ireland
- Denomination: Roman Catholic
- Coat of arms: George Stack's coat of arms

George Stack CStJ (born 9 May 1946) is a prelate of the Roman Catholic Church. He was installed as the seventh Archbishop of Cardiff on 20 June 2011 and retired on 20 June 2022.

== Biography ==
George Stack was born in Cork, Ireland, on 9 May 1946. He attended school in Highgate, London, before entering seminary at St. Edmund's College, Ware, in 1966. He was ordained deacon in 1971 and completed his seminary training in 1972, being ordained priest on 21 May 1972 by Bishop Victor Guazzelli, an Auxiliary Bishop of the Archdiocese of Westminster.

Following ordination, Father Stack was appointed curate at St Joseph's, parish, Hanwell. Between 1974 and 1977, Stack pursued a Bachelor of Education degree at St Mary's University College, Twickenham. He then became curate at St Paul's, Wood Green, and in 1983 was appointed Parish Priest of Our Lady, Help of Christians in Kentish Town.

In 1990 he was appointed Vicar General for Clergy, a post based at Archbishop's House in Victoria, London. He became Administrator of Westminster Cathedral in 1993, and was granted the title Monsignor.

In 2001, Monsignor Stack was consecrated an Auxiliary Bishop for the Archdiocese of Westminster, by Cardinal Cormac Murphy-O'Connor. In 2006, he was responsible for the pastoral care of deaneries in Hertfordshire and for Westminster's Diocesan Department for Education and Formation.

On 19 April 2011, Bishop Stack was named as the 7th Archbishop of Cardiff. He was installed as archbishop on 20 June 2011, and received the pallium in Rome from Pope Benedict XVI on 29 June 2011. In June 2022, Stack was succeeded by Mark O'Toole as Archbishop of Cardiff.

== Positions held ==
At some unspecified time between 1993 and 2001, while Administrator of Westminster Cathedral, he was appointed one of the first Ecumenical Canons at St Paul's Cathedral.

In 2006, Bishop Stack was identified as holding appointments as Chair of Governors at St Mary's University College, Twickenham; a Governor at Heythrop College in the University of London; and a member of the board of the Hospital of St John and St Elizabeth, London.

In 2011 Bishop Stack was listed as a member of the Department for Education and Formation of the Catholic Bishops' Conference of England and Wales, serving as the Chairman of the Committee for Ministerial Formation and Chairman of the National Office for Vocations. The 2012 Provincial Yearbook confirms the latter two roles and also identifies Archbishop Stack as a Knight Commander of the Order of the Holy Sepulchre, and an Ecclesiastical Knight Grand Cross of Grace of the Constantinian Order of St George. Archbishop Stack is the Sub-Prior of the Sacred Military Constantinian Order of St George within the Delegation of Great Britain and Ireland.

As of 2013, Stack was the 'member bishop' representing England and Wales on ICEL (International Commission on English in the Liturgy).

He is a Vice President of the National Churches Trust.

Archbishop Stack is a chaplain of the Military Order of the Collar, a dynastic order of knighthood of the House of Paternò, and often leads investitures of the Order.

Catholic Church titles
Preceded by Peter Smith	Archbishop of Cardiff; 2011 – 2022	Succeeded by Mark O'Toole
