= John Petit (bishop) =

John Edward Petit
- Bishop of Menevia
- Church: Catholic Church
- Diocese: Diocese of Menevia
- In office: 8 February 1947 – 16 June 1972
- Predecessor: Daniel Hannon
- Successor: Langton Fox

Orders
- Ordination: 9 May 1918
- Consecration: 25 March 1947 by William Godfrey

Personal details
- Born: 26 June 1895 Highgate, London, United Kingdom of Great Britain and Ireland
- Died: 2 June 1975 (aged 79)

John Edward Petit (22 June 1895 – 2 June 1973) was a Roman Catholic prelate who served as the Bishop of Menevia from 1947 to 1972.

Born in London on 22 June 1895, he was ordained to the priesthood on 9 May 1918. He was appointed the Bishop of the Diocese of Menevia by the Holy See on 8 February 1947. His consecration to the Episcopate took place on 25 March 1947, the principal consecrator was Cardinal William Godfrey, Archbishop of Westminster, and the principal co-consecrators were Archbishop Michael McGrath of Cardiff and Bishop Edward Ellis of Nottingham. He participated in all the four sessions of the Second Vatican Council, held between in 1962 and 1965.

He retired on 16 June 1972 and assumed the title Bishop Emeritus of Menevia. He died on 2 June 1973, aged 77.

Catholic Church titles
Preceded by Daniel Joseph Hannon	Bishop of Menevia; 1947–1972	Succeeded by Langton Douglas Fox
