= Michael McGrath (bishop) =

Catholic archbishop

The Most Reverend Michael Joseph McGrath
- Archbishop of Cardiff
- Church: Roman Catholic
- Archdiocese: Cardiff
- Appointed: 20 April 1940
- In office: 1940-1961
- Predecessor: Francis Mostyn
- Successor: John Murphy
- Previous post: Bishop of Menevia (1935-1940)

Orders
- Ordination: 12 July 1908 by George Burton
- Consecration: 24 September 1935 by Francis Mostyn
- Rank: Metropolitan Archbishop

Personal details
- Born: 24 March 1882 Kilkenny, Ireland
- Died: 28 February 1961 (aged 78)
- Education: Rockwell College
- Alma mater: St. John's College, Waterford; Royal University of Ireland

Styles of Michael Joseph McGrath
- Reference style: The Most Reverend
- Spoken style: Your Grace
- Religious style: Archbishop

Michael Joseph McGrath (24 March 1882 – 28 February 1961) was an Irish-born prelate of the Roman Catholic Church. He served first as the bishop of Menevia from 1935 to 1940, then the archbishop of Cardiff from 1940 to 1961.

== Personal history ==
=== Early life ===
McGrath was born in Kilkenny, Ireland on 24 March 1882. He was educated at a local Christian Brothers school before attending Rockwell College. He achieved a BA from the Royal University of Ireland in Irish language in 1915, and an MA from its successor the NUI in 1918. His university later awarded him an honorary D.Litt. in 1942.

=== Religious career ===
McGrath trained for the priesthood at St. John's College, Waterford, and he was ordained to the priesthood on 12 July 1908. He initially worked as a priest for the Catholic diocese of Clifton, followed by Bristol's Church of St. Nicholas. In 1918, he was forced take a leave of absence on health grounds. In 1921, he was invited by Bishop Francis Mostyn to work in the Diocese of Menevia. McGrath went on to serve at Flint, Bangor and, in 1928, Aberystywth as parish priest, where he befriended Thomas Gwynn Jones. On 10 August 1935 he was appointed the Bishop of the Diocese of Menevia in Swansea, south Wales. His consecration to the Episcopate took place on 24 September 1935, the principal consecrator was Archbishop Francis Mostyn of Cardiff, and the principal co-consecrators were Bishop William Lee of Clifton and Bishop Ambrose James Moriarty of Shrewsbury. Five years later, McGrath was translated to the Archdiocese of Cardiff as archbishop on 20 June 1940. He died in office on 28 February 1961, aged 78.

=== Report to Rome ===
Archbishop McGrath sent a report to Rome on 7 March 1960, summarising his attitude to Wales. He wrote of the future of the Catholic community in Wales, noting that it was largely made up of descendants of Irish immigrants, separating it from the cultural life of Wales. McGrath also commented on the decline of the Welsh language since the First World War. McGrath predicted that this decline would undermine the religious life of the nation and lead to widespread religious indifference, leading to divorce, broken family life and abortion, among other things.

Catholic Church titles
Preceded by Francis John Vaughan	Bishop of Menevia; 1935–1940	Succeeded by Daniel Joseph Hannon
Preceded by Francis Mostyn	Archbishop of Cardiff; 1940–1961	Succeeded by John Aloysius Murphy
