= Daniel Hannon =

Daniel Joseph Hannon
- Bishop of Menevia
- Church: Catholic Church
- Diocese: Diocese of Menevia
- In office: 15 March 1941 – 26 April 1946
- Predecessor: Michael McGrath
- Successor: John Petit

Orders
- Ordination: 22 September 1907
- Consecration: 1 May 1941 by William Godfrey

Personal details
- Born: 12 June 1884 Rotherham, Yorkshire, United Kingdom of Great Britain and Ireland
- Died: 26 April 1946 (aged 61) Wrexham, Denbighshire, United Kingdom

Daniel Joseph Hannon (12 June 1884 – 26 April 1946) was a Roman Catholic prelate who served as the Bishop of Menevia from 1941 to 1946.

Born in Rotherham, Yorkshire on 12 June 1884, he was ordained to the priesthood on 22 September 1907. He was appointed the Bishop of the Diocese of Menevia by the Holy See on 15 March 1941. His consecration to the Episcopate took place on 1 May 1941, the principal consecrator was Archbishop William Godfrey of Liverpool (later Archbishop of Westminster), and the principal co-consecrators were Archbishop Michael McGrath of Cardiff and Bishop Thomas Flynn of Lancaster.

Bishop Hannon died in office at the Bishop's House in Wrexham on 26 April 1946, aged 61, and was buried in Wrexham Cemetery in Ruabon Road.

Catholic Church titles
Preceded by Michael Joseph McGrath	Bishop of Menevia; 1941–1946	Succeeded by John Edward Petit
