= Francis Mostyn (archbishop of Cardiff) =

Welsh prelate in the Catholic Church (1860–1939)

The Most Reverend Francis Mostyn
- Archbishop of Cardiff
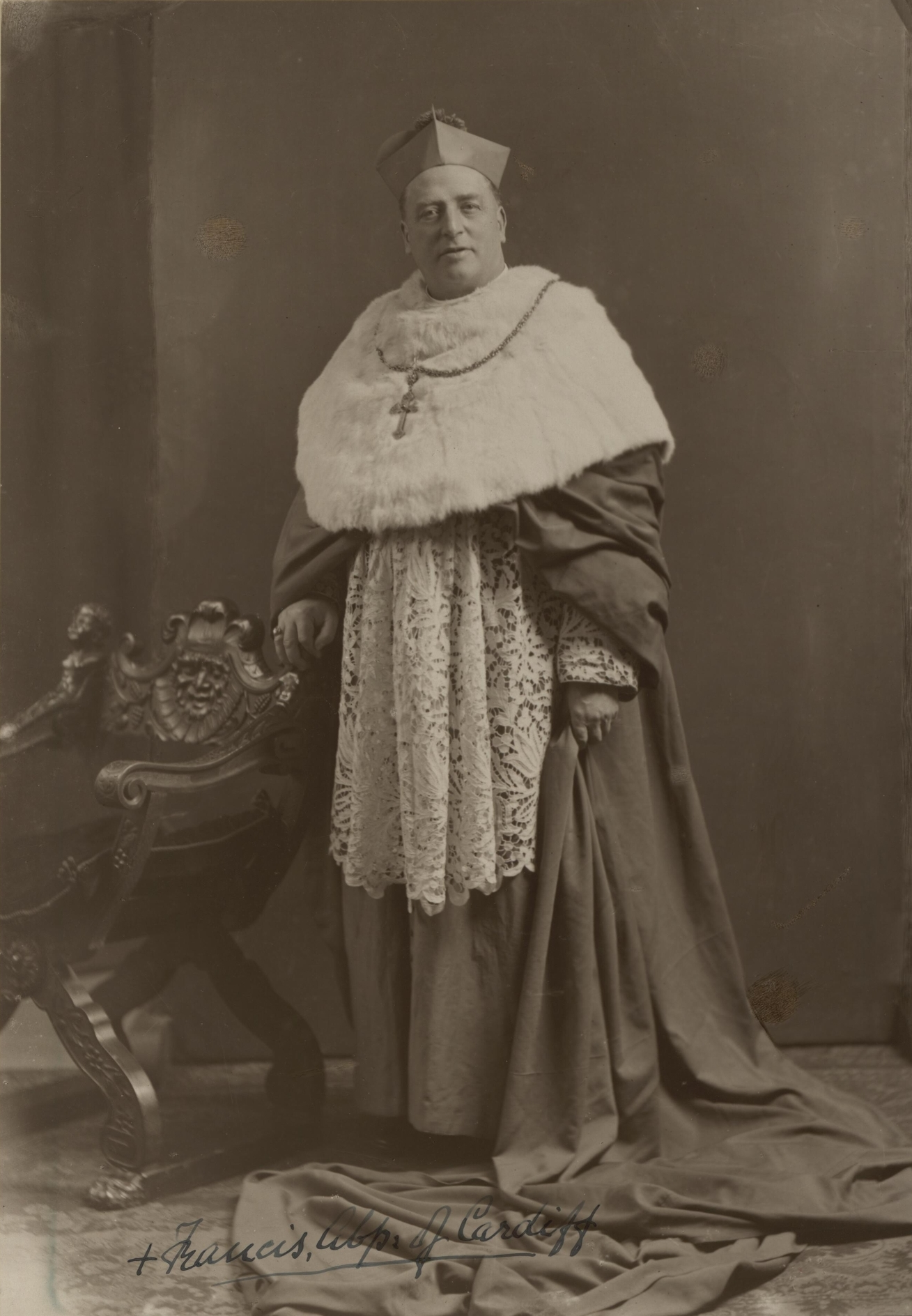
- Church: Catholic
- Archdiocese: Cardiff
- Appointed: 7 March 1921
- In office: 1921–1939
- Predecessor: James Bilsborrow
- Successor: Michael McGrath
- Previous posts: Titular Bishop of Ascalon (1895–1898); Vicar Apostolic of Wales (1895–1898); Bishop of Menevia (1898–1921)

Orders
- Ordination: 14 September 1884
- Consecration: 14 September 1895 by Herbert Vaughan

Personal details
- Born: 6 August 1860 Talacre, Flintshire, Wales
- Died: 25 October 1939 (aged 79) Cardiff, Glamorgan, Wales

Styles of Francis Mostyn
- Reference style: The Most Reverend
- Spoken style: Your Grace
- Religious style: Archbishop

Francis Edward Mostyn (6 August 1860 – 25 October 1939) was a Welsh Catholic prelate who served as Archbishop of Cardiff from 1921 until his death in 1939.

== Biography ==
Francis Edward Joseph Mostyn was born in Talacre, Flintshire, Wales, the fourth son of Sir Pyers Mostyn, 8th Baronet (1811–1882; see Mostyn Baronets) and Frances Georgina (née Fraser; died 1899), a daughter of the 12th Lord Lovat. He was ordained to the priesthood on 14 September 1884. On 4 July 1895, he was appointed the first Vicar Apostolic of Wales and Titular Bishop of Ascalon by Pope Leo XIII.

Mostyn received his episcopal consecration on the following 14 September 1895 (the ninth anniversary of his priestly ordination) from Cardinal Herbert Vaughan, with Bishops John Carroll and John Hedley, OSB, serving as co-consecrators. He was later named Bishop of Menevia upon his vicariate's elevation to a diocese on 14 May 1898. On 7 March 1921, Mostyn was appointed Archbishop of Cardiff by Pope Benedict XV, leading the only archdiocese in Wales.

== Death ==
Archbishop Mostyn died in office in October 1939, aged 79, having served as archbishop for eighteen years.

Catholic Church titles
New title	Vicar Apostolic of Wales; 1895–1898	Last appointment
New title	Bishop of Menevia; 1898–1921	Succeeded by Francis John Vaughan
Preceded by James Romanus Bilsborrow	Archbishop of Cardiff; 1921–1939	Succeeded by Michael Joseph McGrath
