= Diocese of Menevia =

Catholic diocese in Wales (1898–2024)

Coordinates: 52.008°N 4.505°W

Diocese of Menevia Dioecesis Menevensis Esgobaeth Mynyw
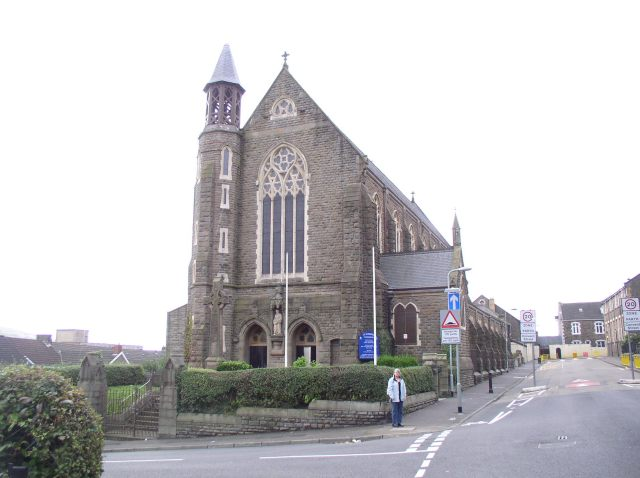
- St Joseph's Cathedral, Swansea

- Coat of arms

Location
- Country: Wales
- Territory: Swansea, Neath Port Talbot, Carmarthenshire, Ceredigion, Pembrokeshire, Brecknock and Radnor
- Ecclesiastical province: Cardiff

Statistics
- Area: 9,310 km^{2} (3,590 sq mi)
- Population: Total; Catholics: (as of 2013); 829,500; 26,200 (3.2%)
- Parishes: 55

Information
- Denomination: Catholic
- Sui iuris church: Latin Church
- Rite: Roman Rite
- Established: 6th century 12 May 1898 (re-establishment)
- Dissolved: 2024
- Cathedral: Swansea Cathedral
- Secular priests: 30

Leadership
- Pope: Leo XIV
- Bishop: Mark O'Toole
- Metropolitan Archbishop: Mark O'Toole
- Vicar General: Joseph Cefai
- Bishops emeritus: Thomas Matthew Burns

Map
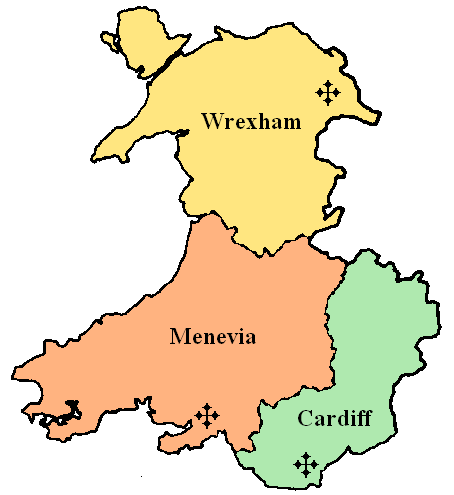
- Diocese of Menevia within the Province of Cardiff

Website
- menevia.org

The Diocese of Menevia (Latin: Dioecesis Menevensis) was a Latin Church diocese of the Catholic Church in Wales. It was one of two suffragan dioceses in the ecclesiastical province of Cardiff and was subject to the Archdiocese of Cardiff, until it merged with the archdiocese in 2024, to form the Roman Catholic Archdiocese of Cardiff-Menevia.

== History ==
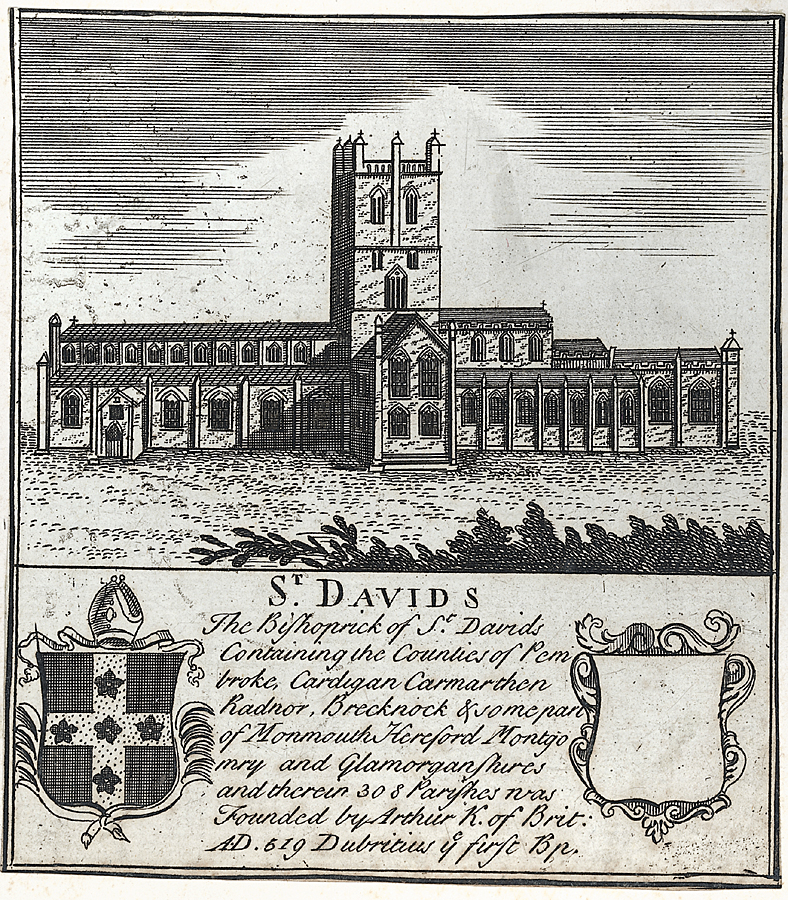
An engraving of St David's Cathedral c.1790 with an account of its history

The history of the diocese of St Davids is traditionally traced to that saint (Dewi) in the latter half of the 6th century. Records of the history of the diocese before Norman times are very fragmentary, however, consisting of a few chance references in old chronicles, such as Annales Cambriae and Brut y Tywysogion (Rolls Series).

On 12 May 1898, the Apostolic Vicariate of Wales was elevated to diocesan status and had its seat at the Cathedral Church of Our Lady of Sorrows in Wrexham until 1987 when the Diocese of Wrexham was created.The Diocese of Menevia covered between 1987 and 2024 the area roughly that of the ancient Diocese of St Davids. ("Menevia" was the Roman name for St Davids.) The Catholic diocese was led by Mark O'Toole, Archbishop of Cardiff, when Cardiff and Menevia merged in a single Archdiocese in 2024.

The sixth century bishop St Ismael is honoured on 16 June.

=== Timeline ===
- 6th Century: Saint David becomes bishop
- 21 January 1560: diocese disestablished (English Reformation), becomes the protestant Diocese of St Davids.
- 29 September 1850: Universalis Ecclesiae: The Roman Catholic Church in Wales is split between the Diocese of Shrewsbury in the north and the Diocese of Newport and Menevia in the south.
- 4 September 1860: Belmont Abbey, Herefordshire, the cathedral priory of the Diocese of Newport and Menevia is consecrated.
- 4 July 1895: The Diocese of Newport and Menevia splits. Glamorgan, Monmouth and Herefordshire become the Diocese of Newport. The rest of Wales, including North Wales from the Diocese of Shrewsbury, becomes the Apostolic Vicariate of Wales.
- 12 May 1898: The Apostolic Vicariate of Wales become the Diocese of Menevia with Wrexham Cathedral as its pro-cathedral.
- 7 February 1916: The Diocese of Newport becomes the Archdiocese of Cardiff and it is decided that St David's church in Cardiff would become its cathedral.
- 12 March 1920: St David's Cathedral, Cardiff is officially made the metropolitan cathedral of the Archdiocese of Cardiff.
- 12 February 1987: The Diocese of Menevia is split. The north becomes the Diocese of Wrexham with its cathedral remaining in Wrexham. The south remains the Diocese of Menevia and sets up Swansea Cathedral.
- 12 September 2024: Pope Francis creates the Archdiocese of Cardiff-Menevia by merging the Archdiocese of Cardiff and the Diocese of Menevia.

== Details ==
In 2007, there were 27,561 Catholics in the diocese which was served by 34 diocesan priests, 19 religious priests, 9 non-ordained male religious and 100 female religious. There are 34 Catholic educational institutions in the then-diocese, including three secondary schools:

- St Joseph's Catholic School and Sixth-Form Centre, Port Talbot
- St John Lloyd Catholic Comprehensive School, Llanelli
- Bishop Vaughan Catholic School, Swansea

Founded in 1965, St Joseph's School was the first Catholic comprehensive school in Wales.

The geographic remit consisted of the City and County of Swansea, Neath and Port Talbot, and the traditional counties of Brecknockshire, Cardiganshire, Carmarthenshire, Pembrokeshire and Radnorshire - an area of 9,310 square kilometres (3,590 sq mi) roughly.

The cathedra was located at St Joseph's Cathedral, Swansea. Situated within what was the diocese is the Welsh National Shrine of Our Lady of Cardigan at Cardigan.

== Bishops ==
=== Ordinaries ===
- Francis Edward Joseph Mostyn † (4 July 1895 – 7 March 1921 appointed archbishop of Cardiff)
- Francis J. Vaughan † (21 June 1926 – 13 March 1935 died)
- Michael Joseph McGrath † (10 August 1935 – 20 June 1940 appointed archbishop of Cardiff)
- Daniel Joseph Hannon † (15 March 1941 – 26 April 1946 died)
- John Edward Petit † (8 February 1947 – 16 June 1972 retired)
- Langton Douglas Fox † (16 June 1972 – 5 February 1981 resigned)
- John Aloysius Ward, OFM Cap † (5 February 1981 succeeded – 25 March 1983 appointed archbishop of Cardiff)
- James Hannigan † (13 October 1983 – 12 February 1987 appointed bishop of Wrexham)
- Daniel Joseph Mullins † (12 February 1987 – 12 June 2001 retired)
- John Mark Jabalé (12 June 2001 – 16 October 2008 retired)
- Thomas Matthew Burns (16 October 2008 – 11 July 2019 retired)
- Mark O'Toole (Appointed 27 April 2022. Diocese merged with the Archdiocese of Cardiff in persona Episcopi. Installed on 23 June 2022)

=== Coadjutor Bishops ===
- John Peter Mark Jabalé, O.S.B. (2000-2001)
- John Aloysius Ward, O.F.M. Cap. † (1980-1981)

=== Auxiliary Bishop ===
- Langton Douglas Fox † (1965-1972), appointed Bishop of Menevia.

=== Another priest of this diocese who became bishop ===
- Peter Malcolm Brignall (priest here, 1978–1987), appointed Bishop of Wrexham, Wales in 2012.

== Deaneries ==
There were a total of five deaneries in the Diocese of Menevia, all of which cover several churches in that area, overseen by a dean.

The deaneries are:

- Carmarthen Deanery
- Llandrindod Wells Deanery
- Pembroke Deanery
- Port Talbot Deanery
- Swansea Deanery

== See also ==
- Catholic Bishops' Conference of England and Wales
- Our Lady of Cardigan
- Caldey Abbey
- Chapel of St Non
