= 1937 in architecture =

The year 1937 in architecture involved some significant architectural events and new buildings.

== Events ==
- May – The Georgian Group is set up as part of the Society for the Protection of Ancient Buildings in England.
- September 7 – Witley Court in Worcestershire, England, is gutted by fire.
- J. M. Richards becomes editor of the Architectural Review (London), continuing until 1971.
- Icelandic State Architect Guðjón Samúelsson's design for the Hallgrímskirkja in Reykjavík is commissioned; it will be constructed 1945–86.

== Buildings and structures ==
=== Buildings opened ===
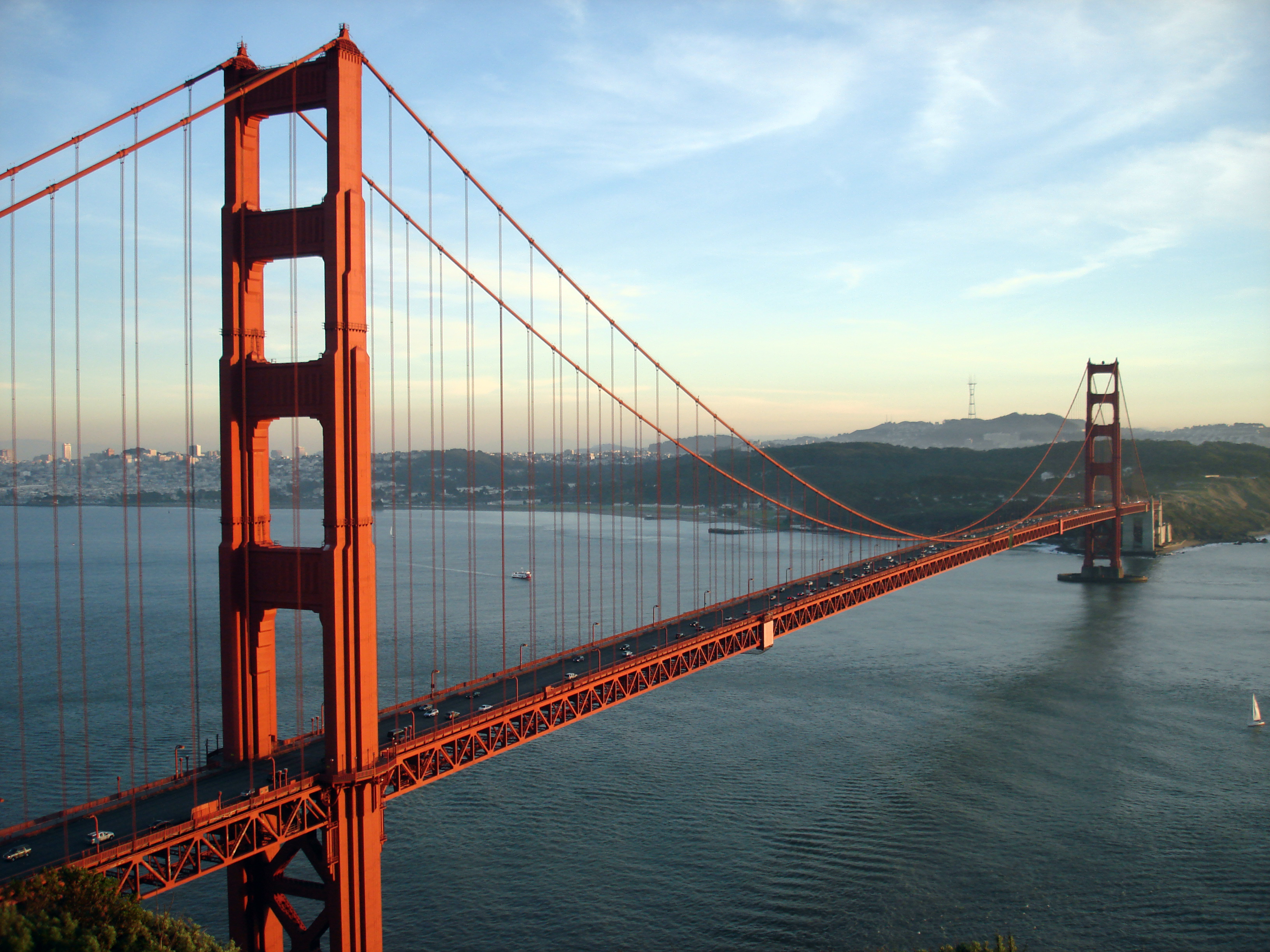
Golden Gate Bridge

- May 6 – Chelsea Bridge in Pimlico, London, designed by G. Topham Forrest, former head of London County Council's Architect's Department, opened by the Prime Minister of Canada, William Lyon Mackenzie King.
- May 27 – The Golden Gate Bridge in San Francisco, longest suspension bridge in the world by the length of central span (1937–1964), designed by Joseph B. Strauss.
- July 18 – Haus der deutschen Kunst ("House of German Art") in Munich, designed by Paul Troost (died 1934), opened by Adolf Hitler to display art of the Third Reich.

=== Buildings completed ===
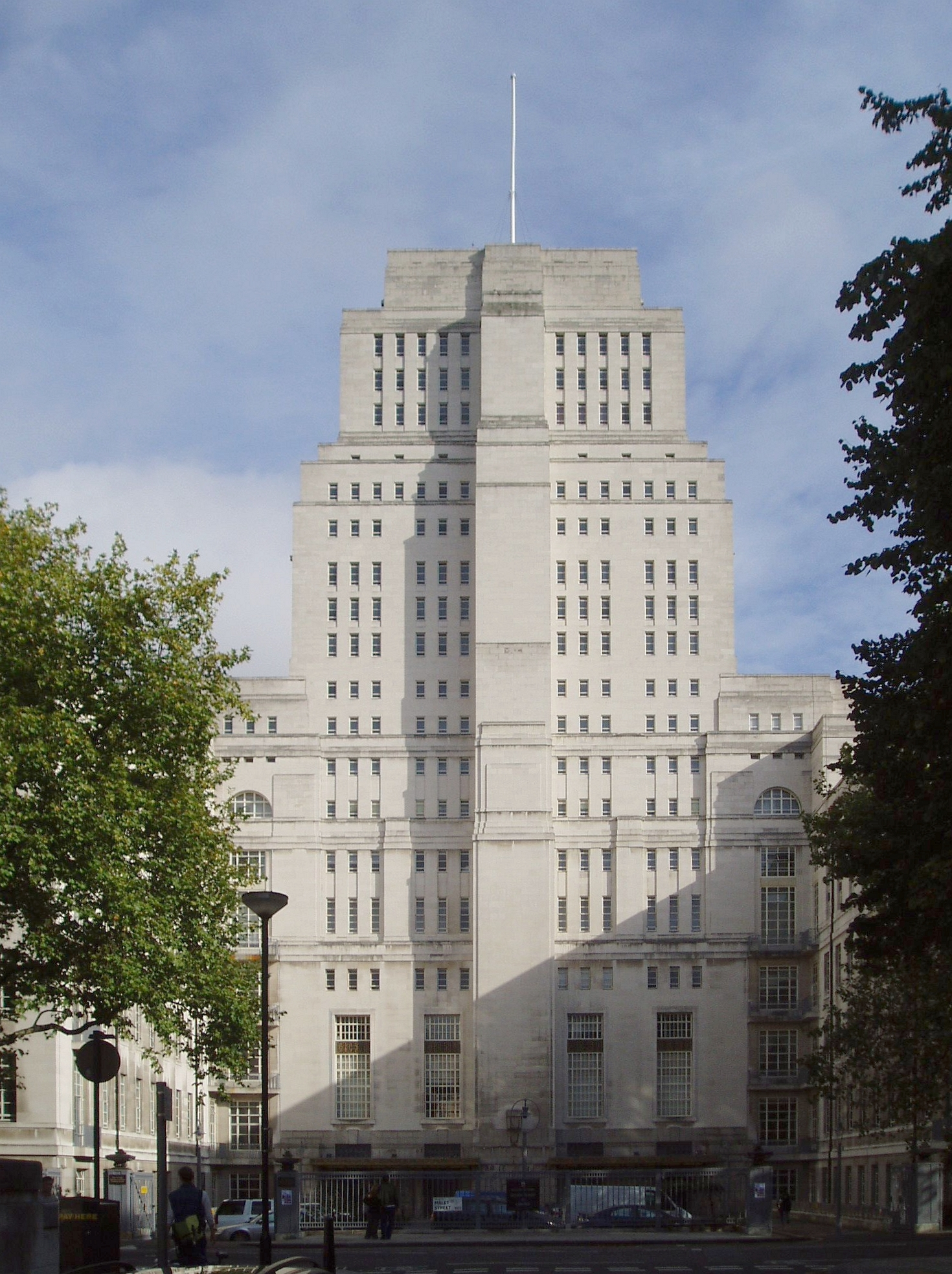
Senate House (University of London)

- Thousand Islands Bridge over the Saint Lawrence River, linking Canada and the United States.
- Petőfi Bridge, Budapest, Hungary.
- Holy Trinity Church, Sighișoara, Romania, designed by Dumitru Petrescu Gopeş.
- Bethlehem Church, Copenhagen, Denmark, by Kaare Klint after original designs by his father, Peder Vilhelm Jensen-Klint (died 1930).
- Church of St Michael and All Angels, Northenden, Manchester, England, designed by Nugent Cachemaille-Day.
- Church of Our Lady Star of the Sea and St Winefride, Amlwch, Wales, designed by Giuseppe Rinvolucri.
- Senate House (University of London), designed by Charles Holden.
- Dolphin Square in Pimlico, London, designed by Gordon Jeeves.
- Villa Myrdal, designed by Sven Markelius.
- 3 Mapu Street, White City (Tel Aviv), Mandatory Palestine, designed by Ben-Ami Shulman.
- St Ann's Court, near Chertsey in England, a modernist circular house designed by Raymond McGrath for Gerald L. Schlesinger and his partner landscape architect Christopher Tunnard.
- Houses in Frognal Close, Hampstead, London, designed by Ernst L. Freud.
- Kensal House in Ladbroke Grove, London, two low-rise blocks of modernist flats for the working class designed by Maxwell Fry.
- Republic pavilion, Barcelona, and Spanish Republican government pavilion at the Exposition Internationale des Arts et Techniques dans la Vie Moderne in Paris, both designed by Josep Lluís Sert.
- Club Moderne, Anaconda, Montana, designed by Fred F. Willson, built.
- Via della Conciliazione in Rome constructed following demolition of the Piazza Scossacavalli.

== Awards ==
- RIBA Royal Gold Medal – Raymond Unwin.
- Grand Prix de Rome, architecture: Paul Jacques Grillo

== Births ==
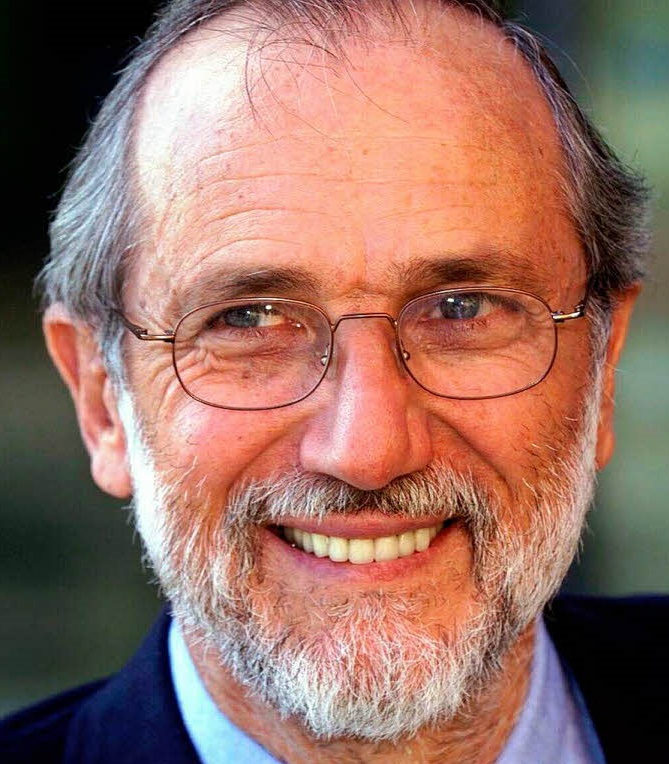
Renzo Piano

- February 7 – Daryl Jackson, Australian architect (died 2026)
- April 18 – Jan Kaplický, Czech architect mainly active in UK (died 2009)
- May 9 – Rafael Moneo, Spanish architect
- September 14 – Renzo Piano, Italian Pritzker Prize-winning architect
- October 3 – Richard England, Maltese architect
- October 24 – M. Rosaria Piomelli, born Agrisano, Italian-born American architect
- December 7 – Ron Labinski, American stadium architect (died 2023)
- date unknown
  - Kate Macintosh, Scottish-born architect
  - Georgie Wolton, born Cheesman, English architect
  - Yoshio Taniguchi, Japanese architect active in New York

== Deaths ==
- January 10 – Bertie Crewe, English architect (born 1860)
- January 28 – Anastasios Metaxas, Greek architect and shooting champion (born 1862)
- February 11 – Walter Burley Griffin, US architect and landscape architect, involved in design of Canberra (born 1876)
- May 9 – Harry Barton, US architect from North Carolina (born 1876)
- August 27 – John Russell Pope, US architect known for his work in Washington, DC (born 1874)
- November 23 – Edward Prioleau Warren, English architect (born 1856)
