= Giuseppe Rinvolucri =

Italian engineer and architect

Giuseppe Rinvolucri

Giuseppe Rinvolucri (1894–1963) was an Italian engineer and architect who lived in Wales. He is known for his designs for several Roman Catholic churches, including the parabolic-arched church of Our Lady Star of the Sea and St Winefride in Amlwch, Anglesey. He designed three churches in north Wales, all of which are now listed buildings, and two in England.

== Personal life ==
Rinvolucri was born on 8 September 1890 in Savigliano, Piedmont, Italy. His father Guglielmo was an engineer, but he died when Guiseppe was very young. He went to school in Mondovì, then went to Polytechnic University of Turin where he studied engineering. After graduating in 1914 he joined the Italian Army as a second lieutenant in the 2nd Engineer Regiment (Italy) and fought in the First World War against the Austro-Hungarian Empire. After the war he was a civil engineer in Turin.

In the 1920s he met an Englishwoman from Staffordshire, Anna Gwenmore Sopwith, who was on holiday in Italy, and they married in Turin in 1925. They returned to Staffordshire in 1928, then moved to Conwy, North Wales, in 1929. She died two years later. He considered joining the priesthood, but then embarked on his career as an ecclesiastical architect, building Catholic churches.

In 1937 Rinvolucri designed and built St Francis Grange, Glan Conwy, an art deco style dwelling overlooking the Conwy estuary, where he lived the rest of his life. Soon after he retired from architectural work and became a market gardener, farming the two acres around his house. He also taught classes in Italian and led cultural trips to Italy.

In 1939, he married Mina Josephine Moore (born Liverpool 1902), an educationalist and lecturer at the University College of South Wales and Monmouthshire in Cardiff. In 1940, they had a son which led to a dispute between Mina and Professor Olive Wheeler, her head of department, in which Mina claimed that she had been dismissed because of the birth of her son. Mina consulted a solicitor and complained to the college senate. This led to the senate formally declaring that women should not have to leave the college when they married or had a child. As long as the women could carry out their job, they would remain employed. Mina went on to have a successful career as an academic and author.

After Italy declared war on Britain in June 1940 all Italian citizens, including Rinvolucri, were classed as enemy aliens and he was detained and interned on the Isle of Man. He was released on medical grounds two months later, but he was then investigated because of reports of Fascist sympathies and connections to Welsh and Irish nationalists, and a few months later he was sent back to the internment camp. He was released in March 1943 on a program for internees where they were sent to work for the war cause; in his case he was on a farm in Oxfordshire.

Rinvolucri eventually became a UK citizen in 1951, having had his previous attempt rejected in 1938. He died in 1963 and is buried in St Agnes Road Cemetery, Conwy with his wife Mina, who died in 1991.

== Works ==
=== St Michael & All Angels' Church, Conwy ===
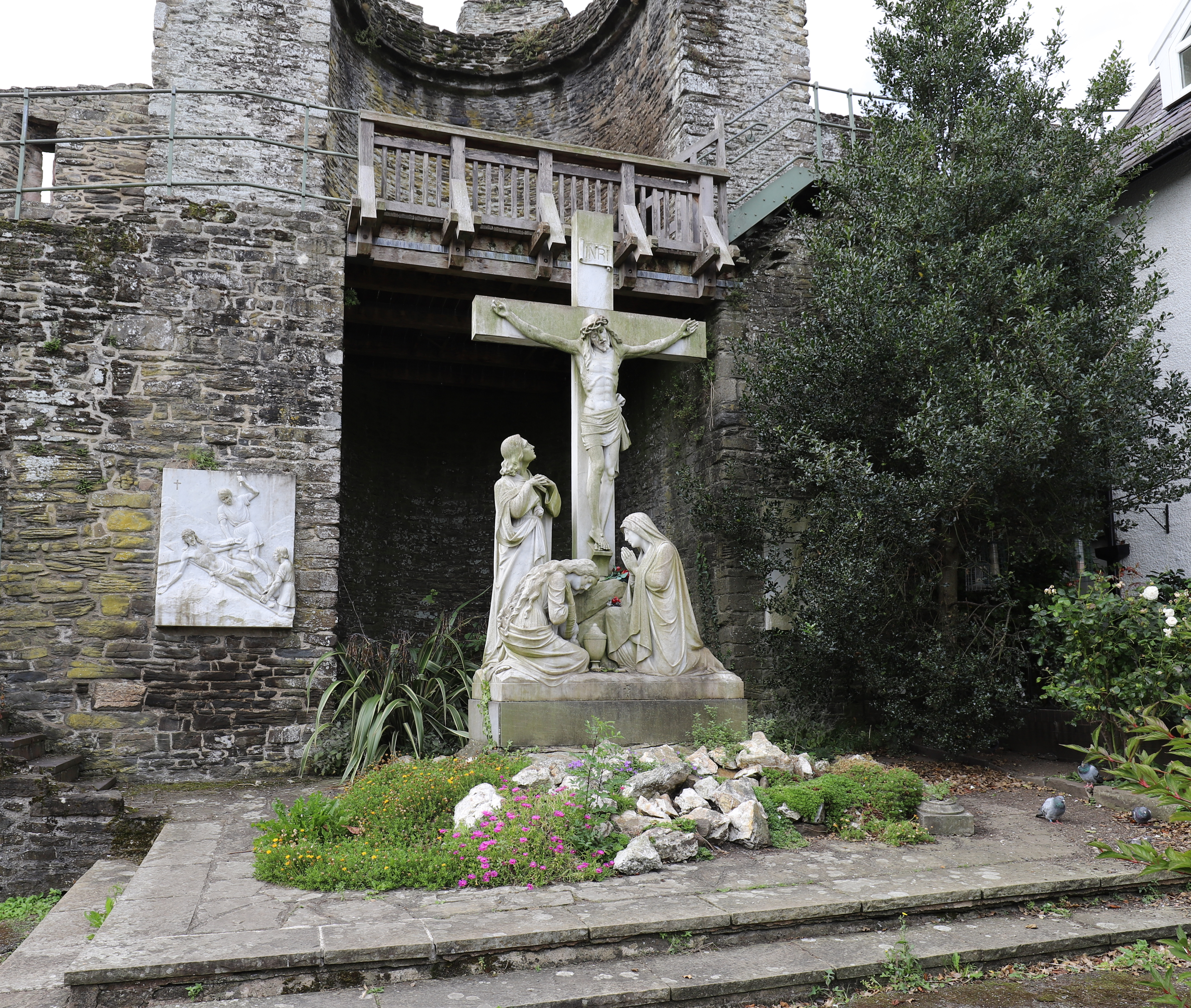
Crucifixion statue and a station of the Cross tablet at St Michael & All Angels' Church, Conwy, installed by Rinvolucri

In 1930 Rinvolucri designed alterations of a former military drill hall for use as the parish hall for St Michael & All Angels' Catholic Church in Conwy. He subsequently designed a group of sculptures outside the church. These form the Stations of the Cross and comprise a large white marble statue of the Crucifixion of Jesus, forming the 12th station, and thirteen large plaster cast tablets for the other stations. Twelve tablets are fixed to the town wall with the last station on the wall of the church. The sculptures form a Grade II listed structure. The church is in Rosemary Lane, immediately inside the medieval town walls.

=== Church of the Most Holy Redeemer, Porthmadog ===
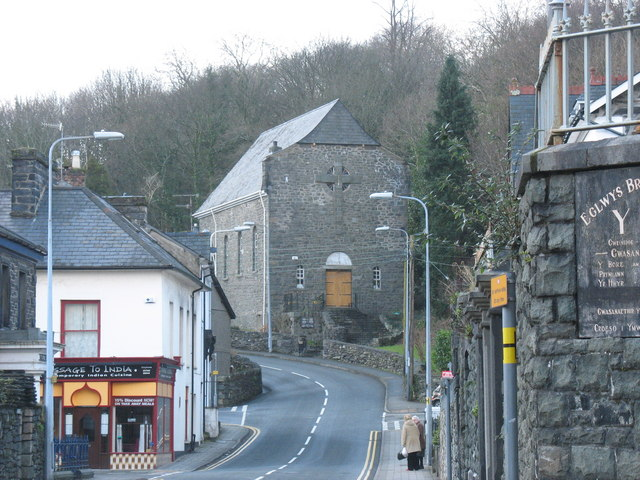
Church of the Most Holy Redeemer, Porthmadog (1933)

The Church of the Most Holy Redeemer in Porthmadog, Gwynedd, was built in 1933 to a design by Rinvolucri in the Romanesque Revival style with rubble stone walls that are unplastered inside. The church contains artworks by the sculptor Jonah Jones, who lived locally. The original concrete roof was replaced by slate in the 1960s. The church is a Grade II listed building.

=== St Therese of Lisieux, Abergele ===
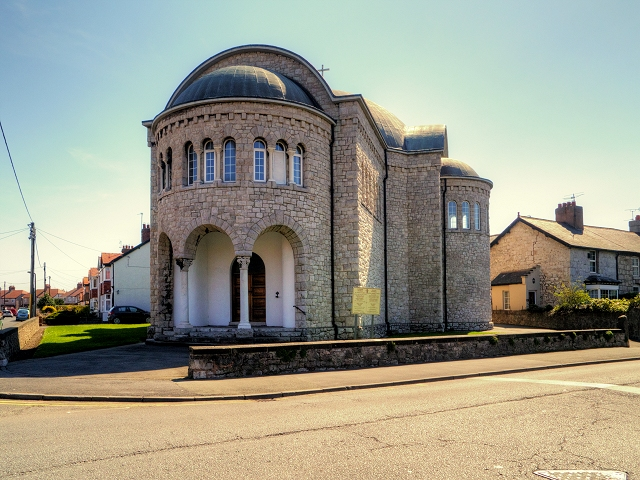
St Therese of Lisieux, Abergele (1934)

St Therese of Lisieux Church in Abergele, Conwy County Borough, was built in 1934 to a design by Rinvolucri. The church is built of reinforced concrete clad in rubble stonework in a Byzantine Revival style. The sanctuary was modified in 1971. The church is a Grade II listed building.

=== St Peter's Church, Ludlow ===
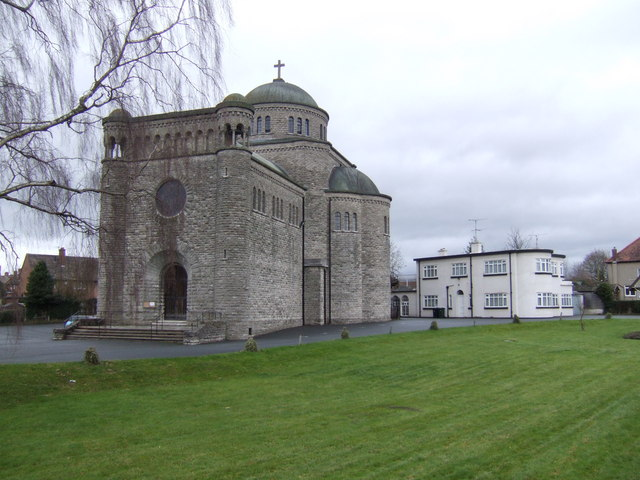
St Peter's, Ludlow (1936)

Rinvolucri designed St Peter's Church, in Ludlow, Shropshire and its adjacent presbytery, which were built in 1936. The large church is built from reinforced concrete faced with local rubble-faced stone. The design reflects both Byzantine Revival and Romanesque Revival architecture, and was influenced by the 11th century Church of Saint Martin of Tours in Frómista, northern Spain. An application for listed building status was made in 2011, but was declined.

=== Our Lady Star of the Sea and St Winefride, Amlwch ===
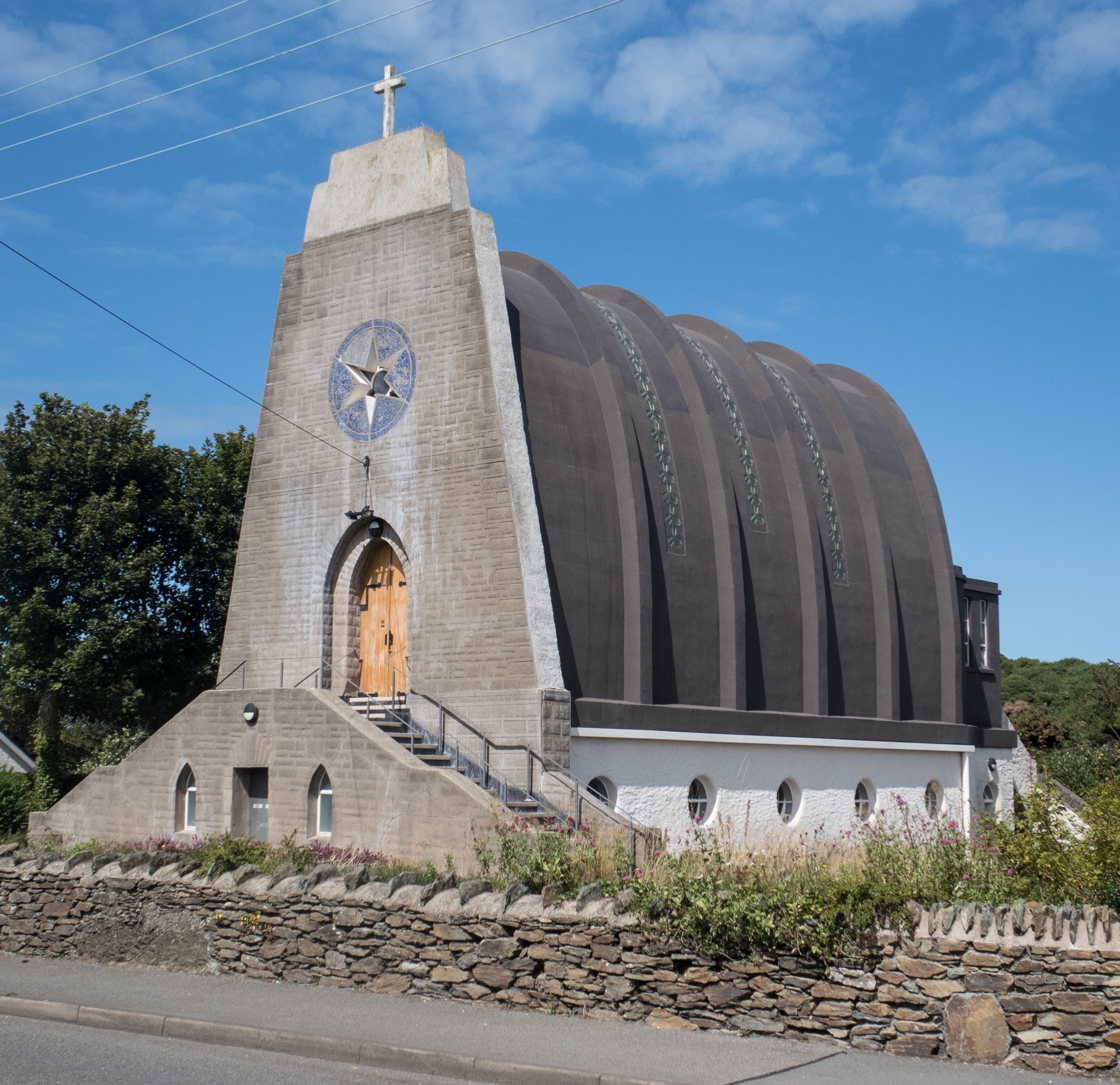
Our Lady Star of the Sea and St Winefride, Amlwch (c. 1937)

Rinvolucri designed the Church of Our Lady Star of the Sea and St Winefride in Amlwch, Anglesey, which was built in around 1937. The innovative design uses parabolic arches made of reinforced concrete designed to resemble the hull of a boat with the windows in the crypt resembling portholes, reflecting Amlwch's maritime heritage. The church is a Grade II* listed building as "a remarkable inter-war church, a highly unusual and experimental design which exploits the plastic qualities of its constructional material to create a powerfully expressive religious building." The church was restored in 2010.

The church has attracted critical praise. The Pevsner Buildings of Wales guide calls it "a piece of Italian architectural daring of the 1930s" – "a soaring reinforced concrete and brick vault formed on six arches, expressed as ribs externally and internally, with a conical apse. Three transverse bands of glazing in geometric trefoils of white and blue. Five glass stars (made in France) perforate the East wall round the apse." Rinvolucri's team of builders constructed the innovative parabolic vault in six months in 1935. The same guide calls it Futurist, "closer to Freyssinet's 1920s airship hangars at Orly, Paris, than to Catholic Church design", and unlike the conservatism of Anglesey building.

=== St Teresa of the Child Jesus, Princes Risborough ===
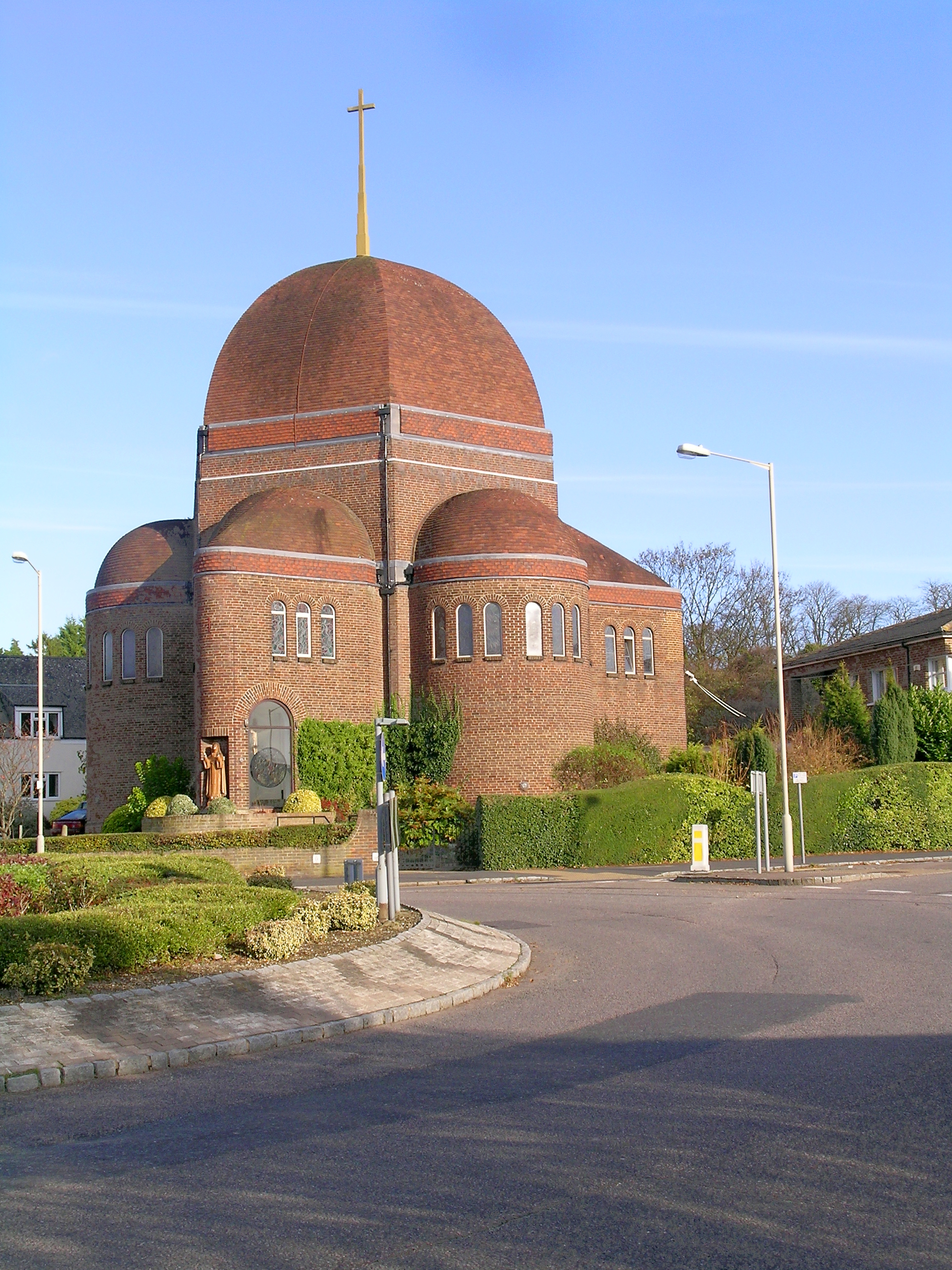
St Teresa's, Princes Risborough (1938)

The Church of St Teresa of the Child Jesus in Princes Risborough, Buckinghamshire was built in 1938 to a design by Rinvolucri. Built in brick, the church has an unusual hexagonal design with three round and three triangular projections, which may refer to a rose, the symbol of St Teresa. The church is topped by a central hexagonal dome. The overall design is Byzantine in style, although the plan is in a Baroque style, similar to Sant'Ivo alla Sapienza in Rome. The interior layout was rotated by 180° in the 1970s, and an entrance extension was added later.
