= St Mary's Church, Holyhead =

- St Mary's Help of Christians RC Church
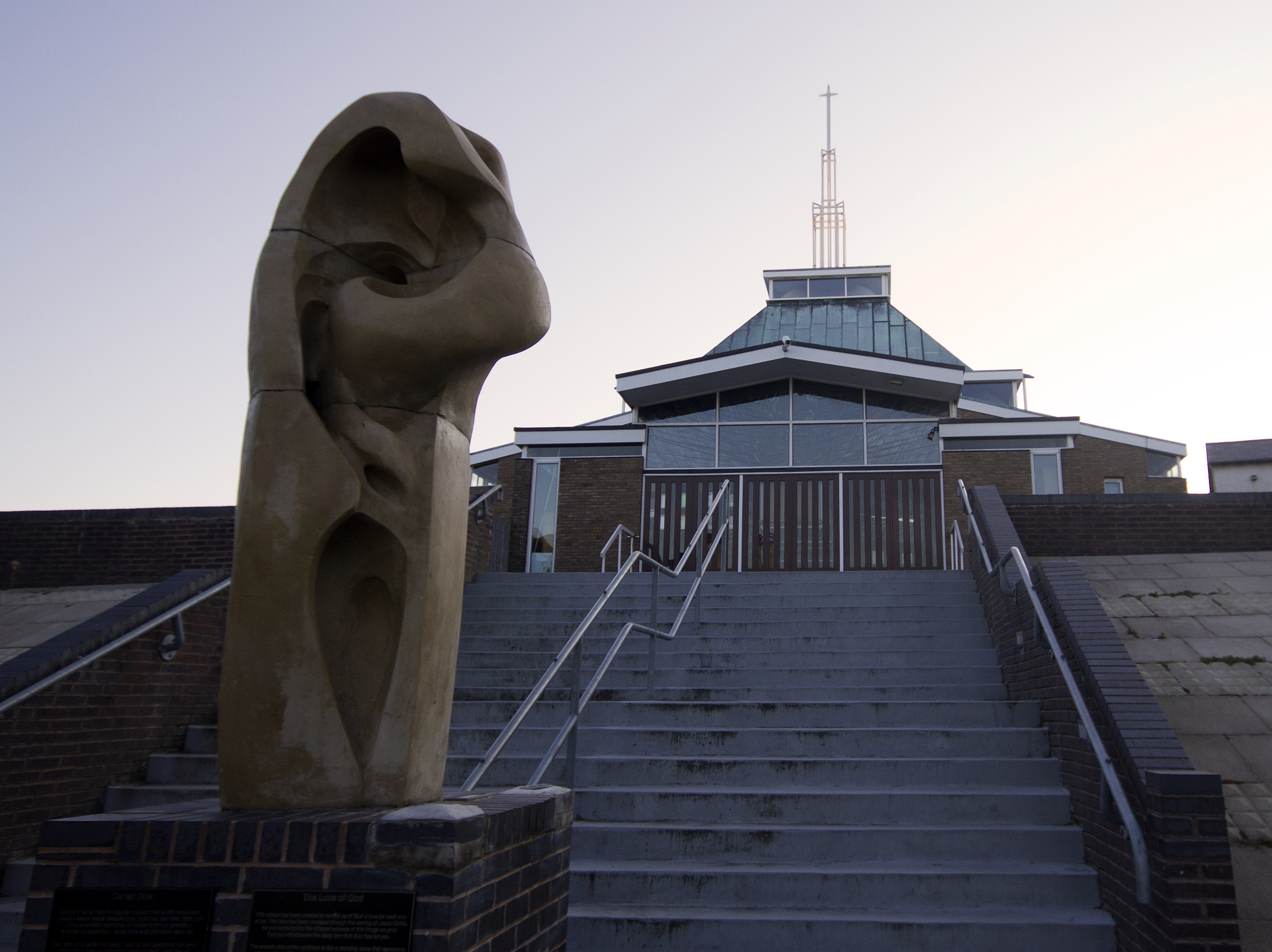
- St Mary's Church, Holyhead
- St Mary's Church, Holyhead
- 53.308775°N 4.633988°W
- Location: Holyhead, Anglesey
- Country: Wales
- Denomination: Roman Catholic
- Website: St. Mary's Church, Holyhead

History
- Status: Parish church
- Founded: 28 February 1965

Architecture
- Functional status: Active

Administration
- Diocese: Diocese of Wrexham

Clergy
- Priest: Fr Frank Murray OMI

St Mary's Church, Holyhead (or St. Mary Help Of Christians RC Church, Holyhead) is a Roman Catholic church in Holyhead on the Isle of Anglesey, north Wales. It is within the Diocese of Wrexham. The church was officially opened on 28 February 1965.

== History and location ==
St Mary's Church is located between Market Street and Longford Road in Holyhead, the principal port of the north Wales county of Anglesey. It was built to replace a previous Roman Catholic church in Holyhead dedicated to St Mary, which was built in 1860 but could only seat 150 people. By the 1960s, the old church had 1,000 parishioners. The new church, which cost £50,000 and could seat 880 people, was opened in 1965. An extension to the church in 1992 added a church hall and a library. St Mary's is described in a book describing the buildings of north Wales as "a large formal square church"; the authors also noted the copper roof, and the platform upon which the church is raised.

The church is part of Caernarfon Deanery within the Diocese of Wrexham. As of 2013, the parish priest is Father Frank Murray, of the Missionary Oblates of Mary Immaculate. The parish of Holyhead also includes St Therese's Church, Rhosneigr. The pattern of services (as of 2013) is for a celebration of Mass on Sunday morning at 11am (with a vigil Mass on Saturday evening) and Mass every weekday morning preceded by Morning Prayer.

In April 2008, the church was burgled and vandalised. £230 from collection boxes was stolen, a font was damaged, paint was poured into the speaker system, white spirit was poured across banners, and hymn books were damaged. The damage to the church cost £14,239.

== St Mary's RC School ==
St Mary's Catholic Primary School, situated next to the church, is part of the parish and has links with the church.
