= Our Lady and St James Church, Bangor =

Coordinates: 53.2262°N 4.1351°W

Our Lady and St James Church
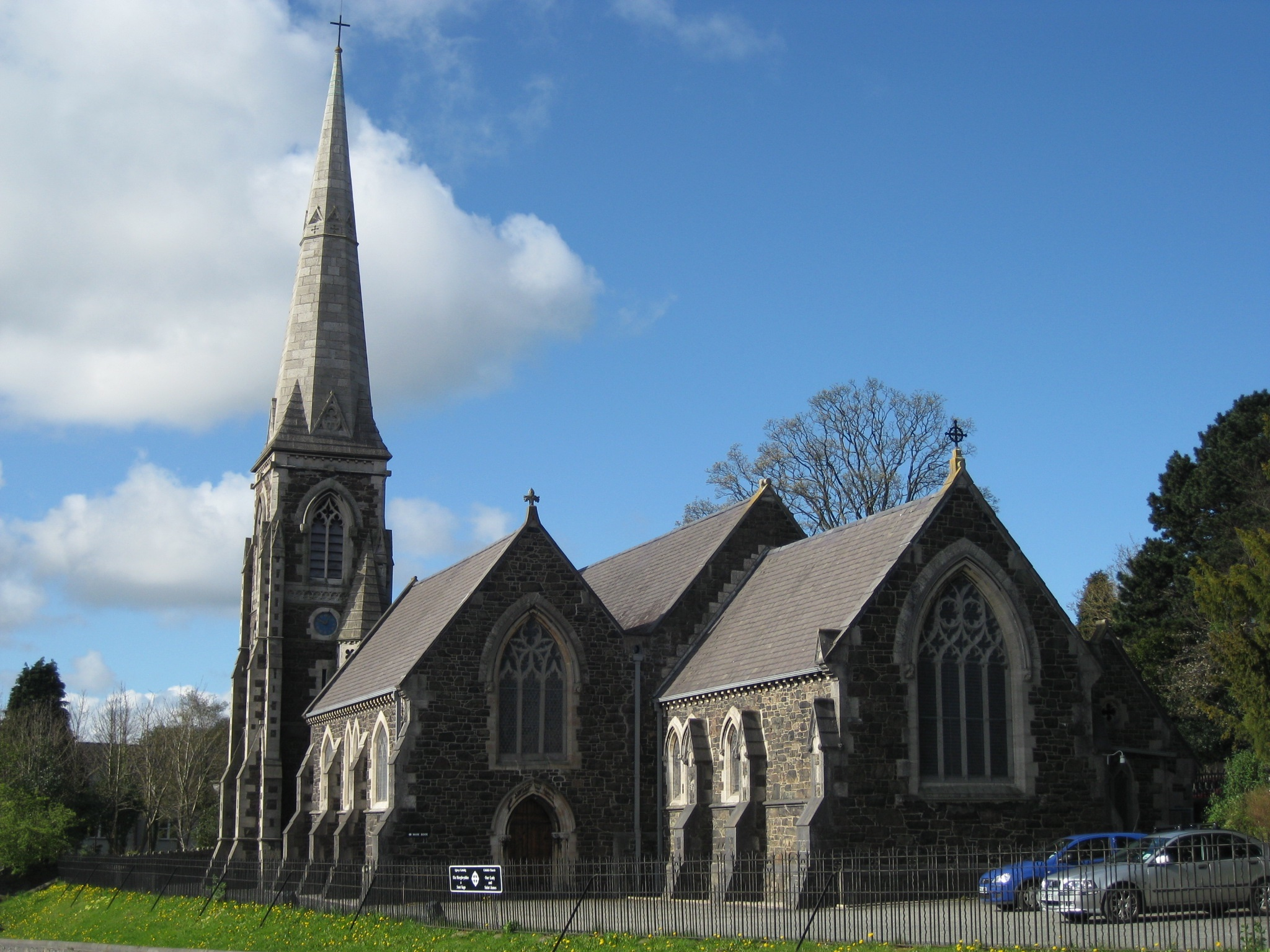
- Our Lady and St James Church
- Location: Bangor, Gwynedd
- Country: Wales
- Denomination: Roman Catholic
- Previous denomination: Church in Wales
- Website: RCDWXM.org.uk/Bangor

History
- Former name: St James' Church
- Status: Active
- Founder: Mrs Price
- Dedication: Mary, mother of Jesus; Saint James
- Dedicated: 8 September 1996
- Events: Reopened 1996

Architecture
- Functional status: Parish church
- Heritage designation: Grade II listed
- Designated: 2 August 1988
- Architect: Henry Kennedy
- Style: Gothic Revival
- Groundbreaking: 29 June 1864
- Completed: 7 September 1866
- Construction cost: £4,000

Administration
- Province: Cardiff
- Diocese: Wrexham
- Deanery: Caernarfon
- Parish: Bangor & Caernarfon

Our Lady and St James Church is a Catholic parish church in Bangor, Gwynedd, Wales. The church structure was built from 1864 to 1865 and designed by Henry Kennedy. Originally, it was built as the Anglican Church of St James. However, in 1994 it closed, and was acquired by the local Catholic diocese in 1996. The local Catholic congregation moved from their old church, Our Lady's Church, to this one and they rededicated it to Our Lady and St James. Architecturally, the church is in the Gothic Revival style. A part of the church was designed by Henry Harold Hughes. It is located on the corner of Holyhead Road and Ffriddoedd Road to the southwest of the city centre. It is a Grade II listed building.

== History ==
=== Our Lady's Church ===
In 1824, it was decided that Bangor would be the location of a North Wales Catholic mission by the Vicar Apostolic of the Western District, Bishop Peter Collingridge. It was difficult finding a suitable location in the city, because of local hostility to Catholics. Houses of local Catholics were often used as temporary places of worship. In 1827, the mission was established with Mass being said in a room in a house in the Hirael ward of the city. Irish Catholics passing through the city would often stay for Mass, including once Daniel O’Connell. Until 1838, the mission was financially supported by the Jesuits at Stonyhurst College.

In 1833, a site for a church was purchased in the Pendref area of the city. Construction started on it and it was opened in 1834. It was designed by Joseph John Scoles, an architect who regularly designed churches for the Jesuits, such as St Winefride's Church, Holywell. The church itself was quite small and by 1920, it was not large enough to accommodate the increasing congregation. A new site for a church on Upper Farrar Road was purchased, but in 1931, the Bishop of Menevia, Francis Vaughan told the priest to sell the land and put the funds towards repairing the church. In 1960, the church was again repaired and renovated. In 1963, to alleviate the overcrowding in the church, St Pius X and St Richard Gwyn Church was opened in nearby Bethesda, but it has since closed.

=== St James' Church ===
In the 19th century, with the expanding population of Bangor, a new Anglican church was needed. The population had doubled between 1831 and 1861. On 28 May 1862, the Dean of Bangor, James Cotton died. The new church would be built in memory of him. The architects were Henry Kennedy and John Mechelen Rogers, the builders were W. T. Rogers, and the benefactor who contributed the most was a Mrs Price. On 29 June 1864, the foundation stone of the church was laid by Mrs Price. The church was built in the Gothic Revival style and the total cost of it came to £4,000. On 7 September 1866, the church was opened and consecrated as its construction costs had already been met.

Over the following hundred years, various extensions and repairs were made to the church. In 1884, a south chapel was added to the church. It was designed by John Mechelen Rogers and built in memory of J. W. Hughes, a churchwarden and church benefactor. In 1894, a sacristy was added to the church and it was designed by Henry Harold Hughes. In 1955, the church pews were replaced with chairs. In 1965, the church was redecorated. The choir stalls were moved from the chancel to the nave and the south aisle was turned into the war memorial chapel, its altar came from Christ Church, Machynlleth, which closed that year. In 1994, the Church in Wales closed the church.

=== Our Lady and St James Church ===
In the 1980s and 1990s, the congregation of Our Lady's Church were still looking for a larger location. Ecumenical efforts were made to share various church locations in the city. As the capacity of St James' Church was double that of Our Lady Church, its purchase made a lot of sense for the congregation of Our Lady's Church. In 1996, the church was acquired by the Diocese of Wrexham, and Our Lady's Church was sold off. The newly acquired church was renamed Our Lady and St James Church, keeping the names of its predecessor churches. On 8 September 1996, the church was reopened.

== Parish ==
In the parish is Bangor University, which has a Catholic chaplaincy. In 2016, the church's parish was merged with St Helen's Church in Caernarfon. The church has two Sunday Masses at 10:00 am and 5:00 pm.

== See also ==
- Bangor Cathedral
