= Monastery of San Zoilo =

Monastery in Carrión de los Condes, Spain

Coordinates: 42.3403°N 4.6111°W

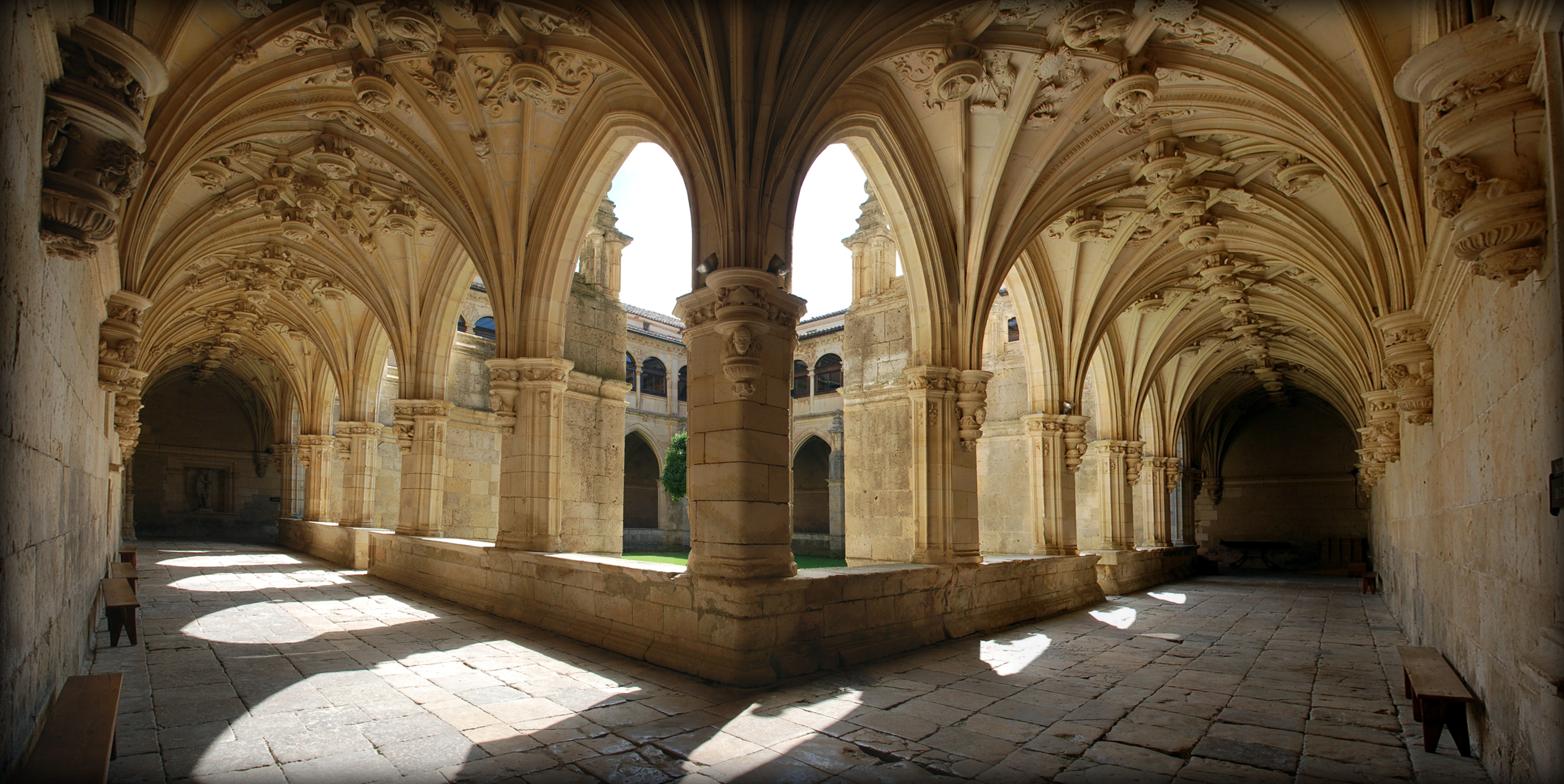
Plateresque cloisters

The monastery of San Zoilo was a Benedictine monastery in Spain between the 10th and 19th centuries. Today, the complex, on the banks of the river Carrión in Carrión de los Condes, houses a luxury hotel.

== History ==
San Zoilo was founded by Count Gómez Díaz and his wife Teresa Peláez, daughter of Pelayo Fróilaz. Originally dedicated to John the Baptist, it obtained its current name after receiving the relics of Saint Zoilus in 1047. In 1076, the widowed Countess Teresa donated the monastery to the Abbey of Cluny. It became the most important Cluniac house in the Kingdom of Castile. In 1118, Queen Urraca donated to it the church of San Martín de Frómista. In the 13th century, San Zoilo was a major landholder in Carrión. Its holdings included the local mosque. King Ferdinand III exempted the citizens from royal taxes, directing them to pay the monastery instead.

The 14th and 15th centuries were a time of decline in San Zoilo. In the 16th century, it was acquired by the Benedictines of Valladolid and was rebuilt. It was abandoned during the Spanish confiscations in the 19th century, before being acquired by the Jesuits and turned into a school. Today, it is a luxury hotel.

== Buildings ==
The main façade of the church dates to the 17th century. It contains a monumental depiction of King Louis IX of France and the coats of arms of some of the abbots. The church contains the tombs of the Banu Gómez family who founded the monastery. An early Romanesque doorway was discovered within a wall in 1993. The cloisters were begun in 1537 by Juan de Badajoz the Younger. They were finished in 1604. The keystones of the vaults are decorated with carved busts in a Renaissance style.

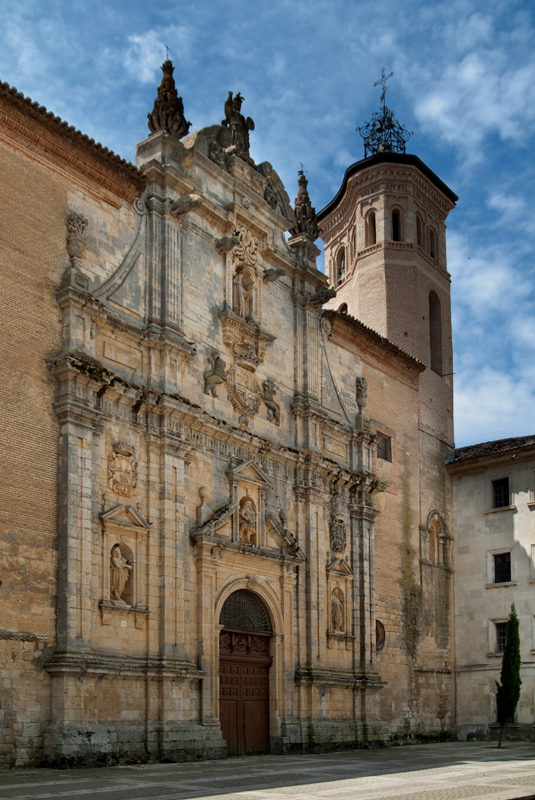
Main façade

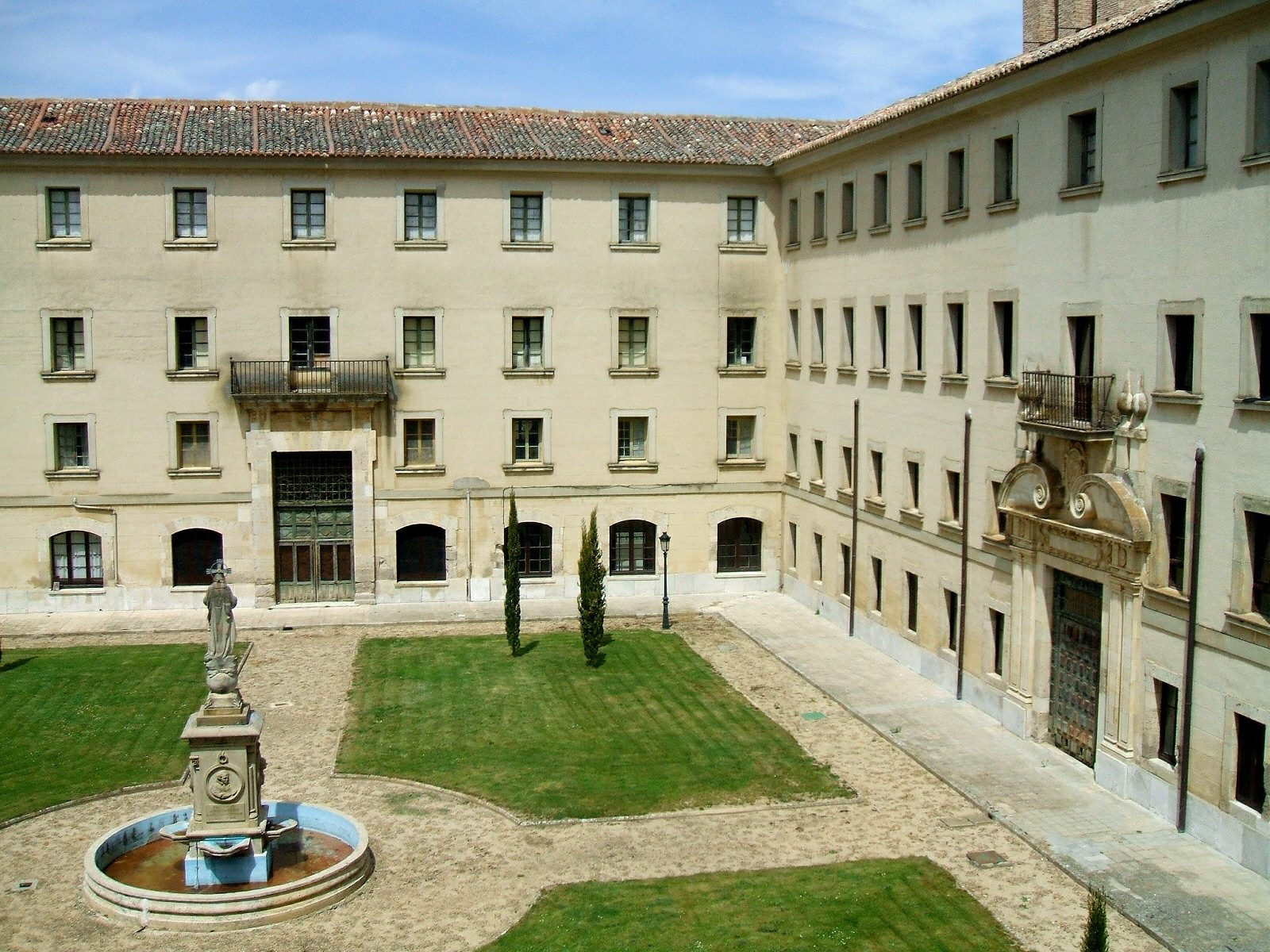
Courtyard

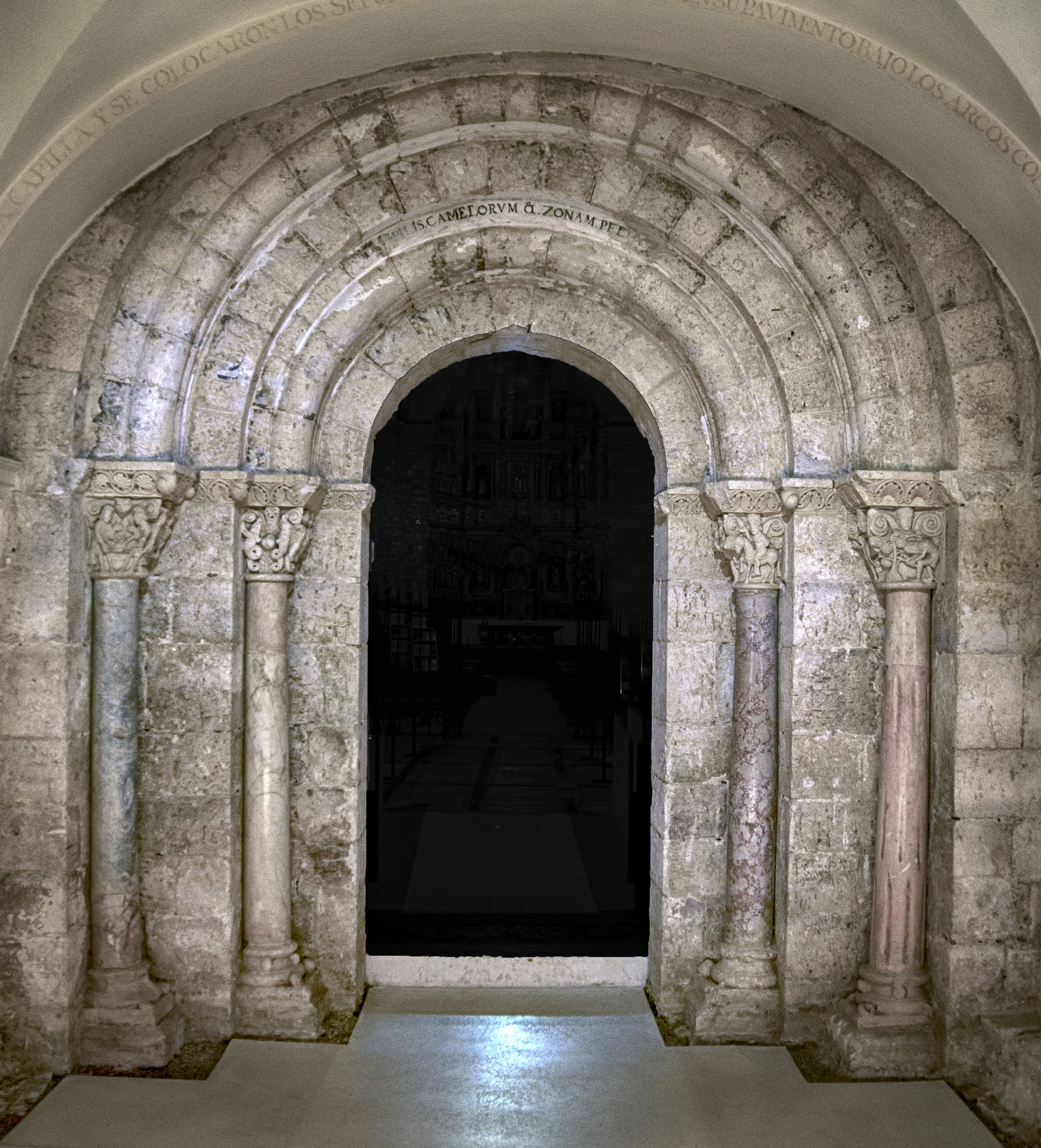
Romanesque doorway

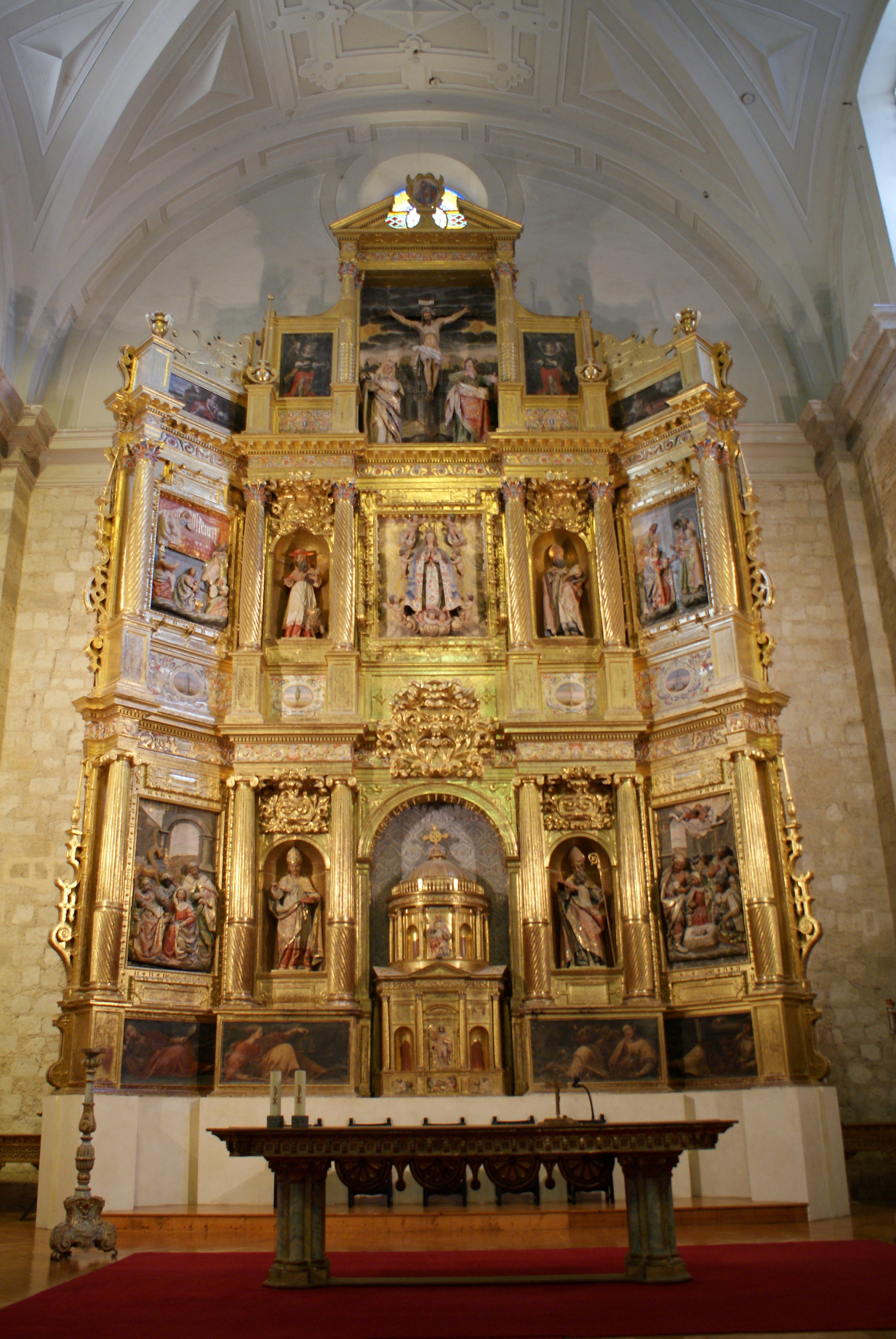
Altarpiece (retablo mayor)

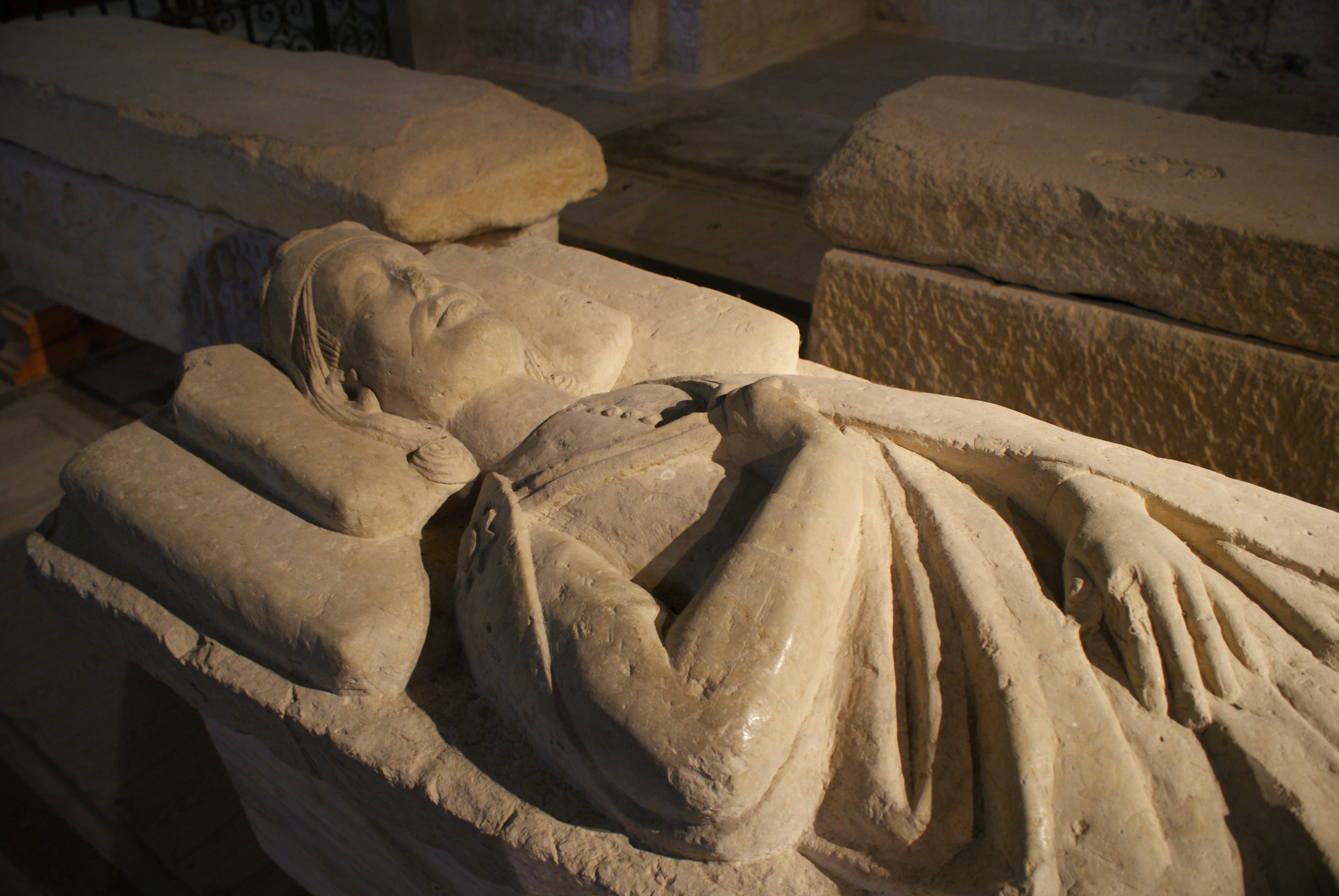
Sepulchre of the Banu Gómez

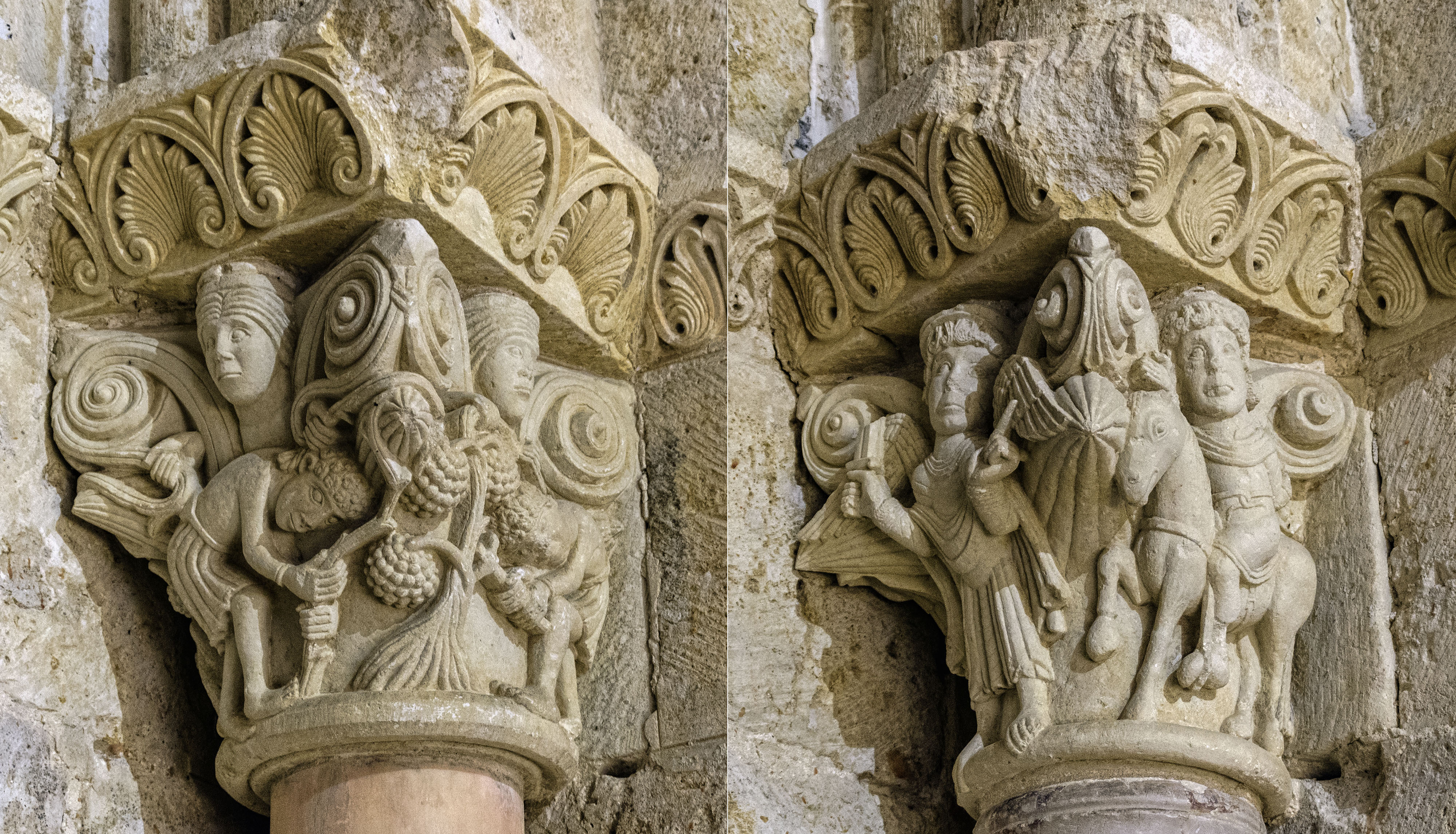
Capitals in the church

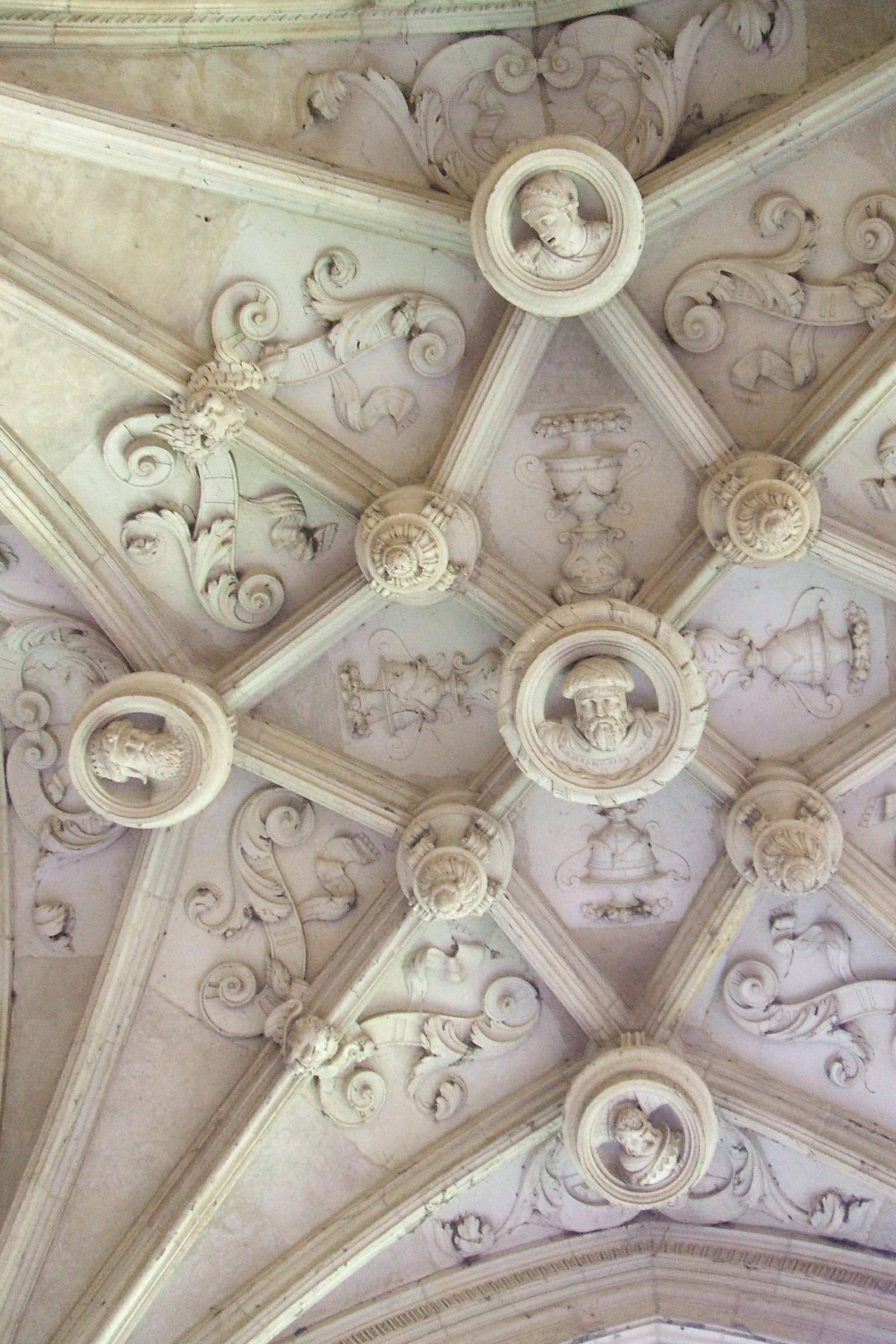
Carved keystones of the vaults of the cloisters
