= Saint Zoilus =

Spanish saint

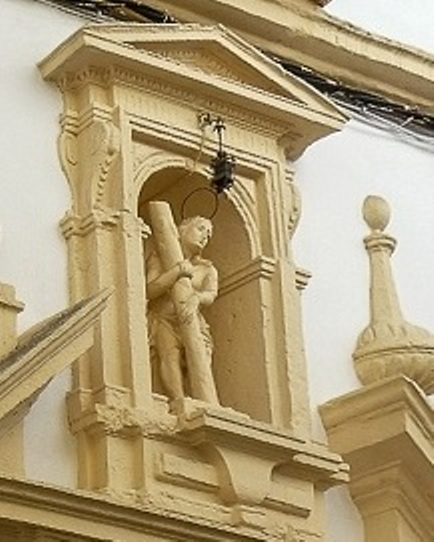
- Córdoba, Ermita de San Zoilo, statue of the saint over the portal

Martyr
- Died: AD 304; Córdoba, Spain
- Venerated in: Orthodox Church; Roman Catholic Church
- Major shrine: San Zoilo de Carrión at Carrión de los Condes
- Feast: 27 June, 22 December (Eastern Christianity)

Saint Zoilus (died 304 AD) is venerated as a saint by the Orthodox Church and the Roman Catholic Church. Christian tradition states that he was a young man martyred with nineteen others at Córdoba, Spain, during the Great Persecution under Diocletian.

== Veneration ==
His name is mentioned by Prudentius and his name appears in the Martyrologium Hieronymianum as well as the Roman Martyrology.

His relics were enshrined at the abbey named after him: the Benedictine abbey of San Zoilo de Carrión at Carrión de los Condes, in the Province of Palencia. There was also a monastery near Córdoba dedicated to him. Some of the subsequent Martyrs of Córdoba were associated with this monastery.

His feast was also celebrated at Chester; he was anciently and incorrectly considered to have reigned by the city's inhabitants.
