= Frómista =

- municipality
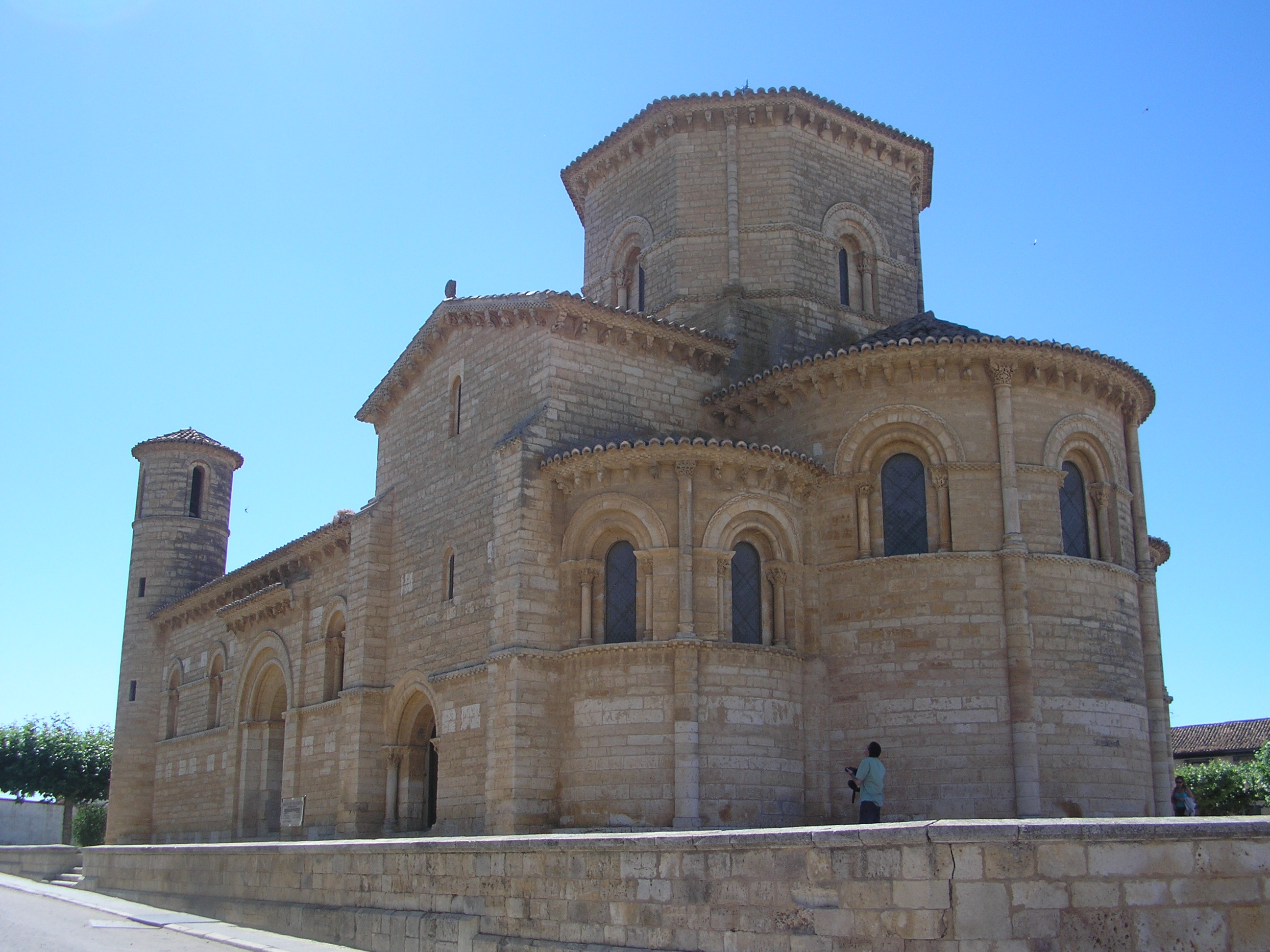
- Church of San Martín de Frómista.

- Coat of arms

- Location in Spain
- Coordinates: 42°16′N 4°42′W
- Country: Spain
- Autonomous community: Castile and León
- Province: Palencia
- Comarca: Tierra de Campos

Government
  - Mayor: Fernando Díaz Mediavilla

Area
  - Total: 46.59 km^{2} (17.99 sq mi)
- Elevation: 780 m (2,560 ft)

Population (2025-01-01)
  - Total: 727
  - Density: 15.6/km^{2} (40.4/sq mi)
- Demonym: Fromisteños
- Time zone: UTC+1 (CET)
  - Summer (DST): UTC+2 (CEST)
- Website: Official website

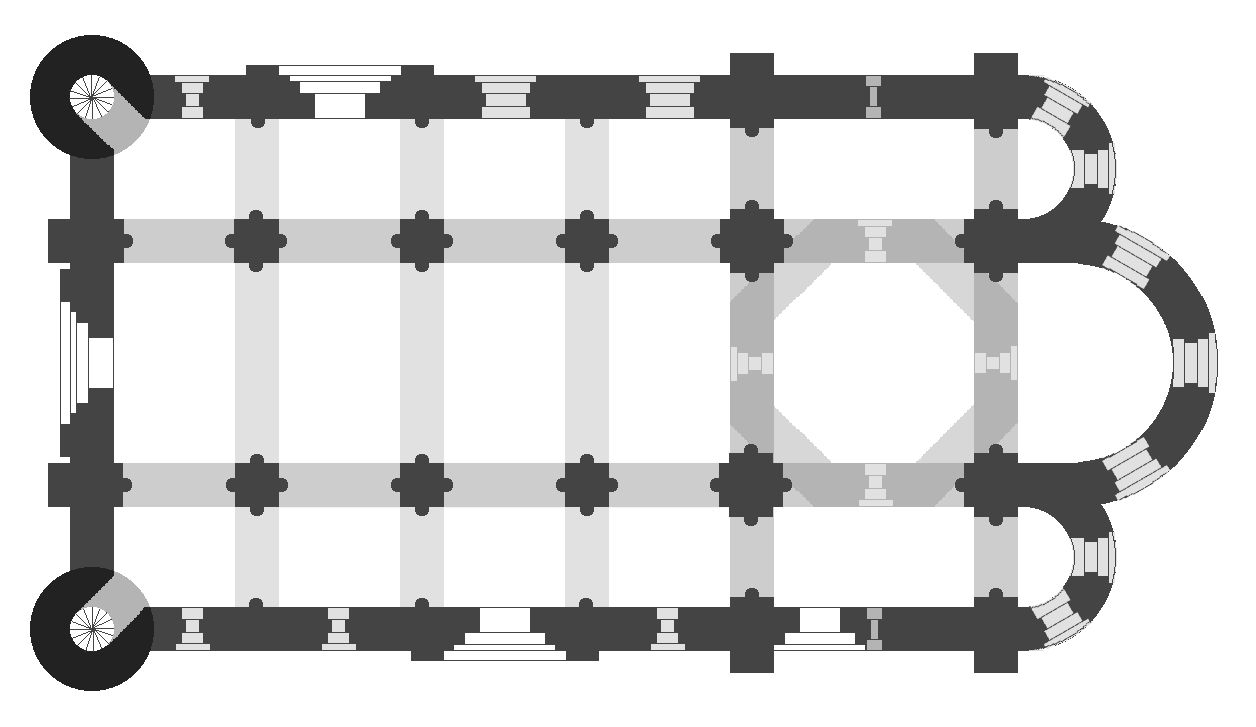
Plan of church of San Martín of Frómista

Frómista is a municipality located in the province of Palencia, Castile and León, Spain. According to the 2009 data (INE), the municipality had a population of 822 inhabitants. In previous centuries, Frómista had a significant population supported by the farming of wheat.

It is a major overnight stopping place for pilgrims traveling along the Camino de Santiago, the Way of St. James.

The church of San Martín de Tours de Frómista was underwritten in part by the widow of Sancho el Mayor of Navarra who imported artisans to build a church in the style of Jaca cathedral.

The other church in town Santa Maria del Castillo located near the train station, is considered redundant and is normally kept locked.

== Main sights ==
- Romanesque church of San Martín de Tours de Frómista (11th century).
- Church of Santa Maria del Castillo, in Gothic-Renaissance style
- Church of St. Peter (begun in the 15th century)
