= Church of Saint Martin of Tours, Frómista =

Church of Saint Martin of Tours
- Iglesia de San Martín de Tours
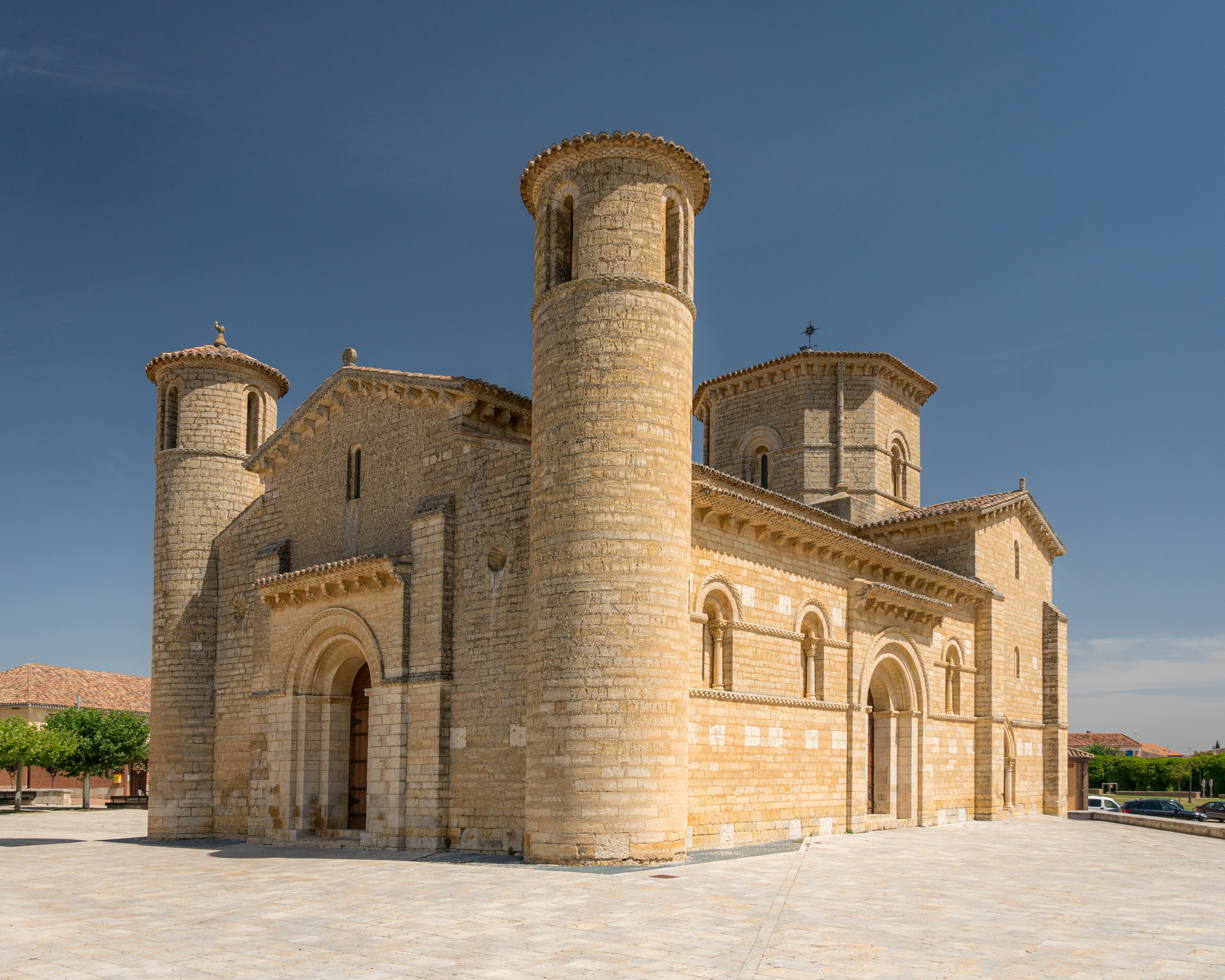
- West façade in 2020.
- Church of Saint Martin of Tours
- Location: Frómista
- Address: 8, Plaza de San Martin
- Country: Spain
- Denomination: Catholic

History
- Dedication: Martin of Tours

Architecture
- Style: Romanesque
- Groundbreaking: 11th Century

Spanish Cultural Heritage
- Type: Non-movable
- Criteria: Monument
- Designated: 21 August 2014
- Reference no.: RI-51-0000066

The Church of Saint Martin of Tours, in Frómista, province of Palencia, Spain, was built in the 11th century in Romanesque style. It is located on the Way of St. James to Santiago de Compostela.

== History ==
The construction of the church was begun in the second half of the 11th century by will of Queen Muniadona of Castile, as part of a monastery, which has disappeared. The church is mentioned for the first time in 1066, and is stylistically connected to other Romanesque edifices in the Way of St. James, such as Jaca Cathedral or San Isidoro de León.

In 1118 it was assigned to the Benedictine priory of San Zoilo at Carrión de los Condes. The monks abandoned the site in the 13th century, giving it to Don Juan Gómez de Manzanedo. During several changes of ownership in the following centuries, the church received several additions in the 15th century: a bell tower over the original dome, and a sacristy. After the Middle Ages it started to decay, and in the 19th century it was declared no longer fit for use as a church.

In 1894 it was declared a National Monument and a restoration was started. This brought the church back to its original state, removing numerous later additions. The church was reopened to the public in 1904.

== Description ==
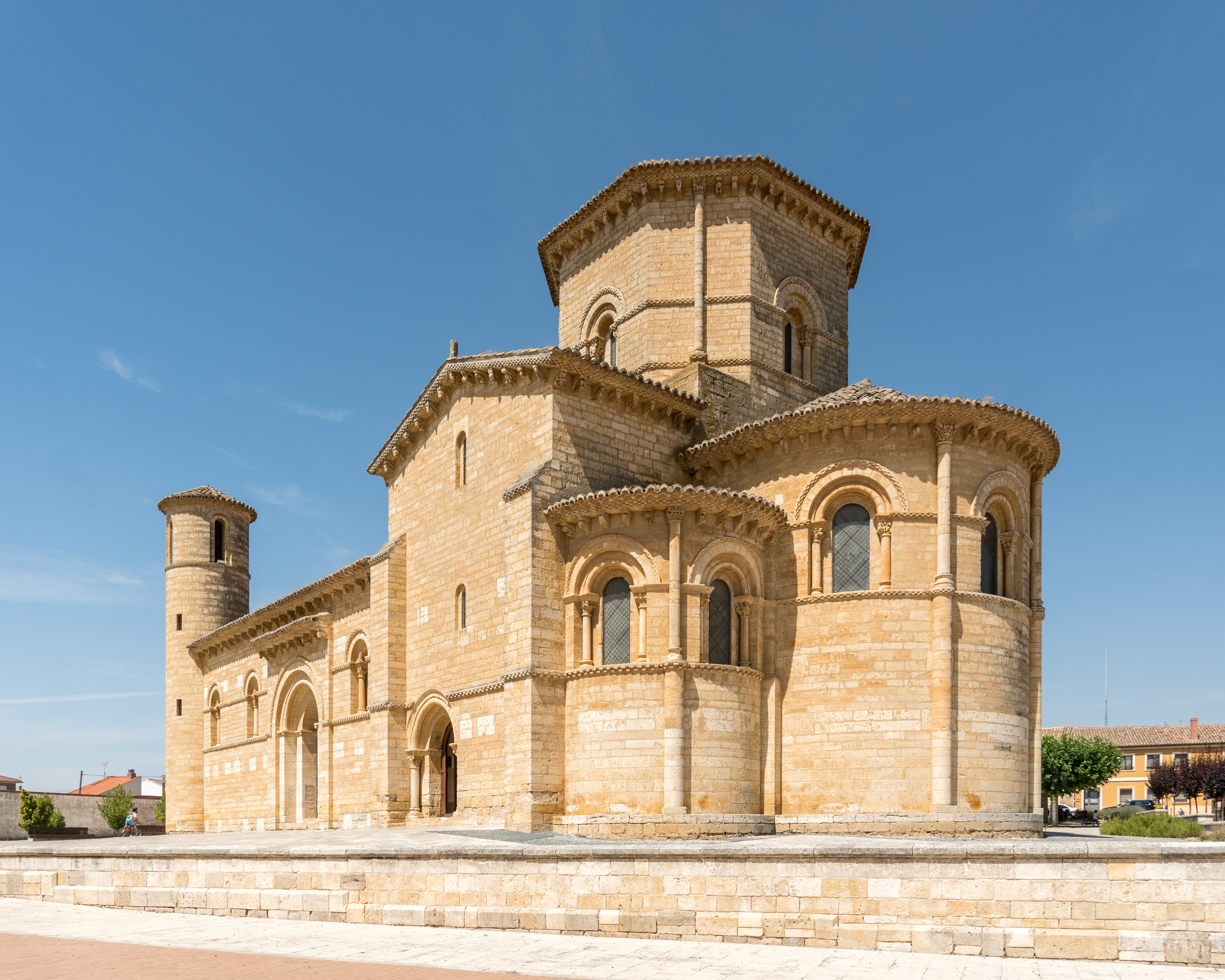
Apse.

Saint Martin of Tours, Frómista has a typical Romanesque exterior. The three-level façade shows the differing height of the nave and aisles of the interior; at the sides are two cylindrical bell towers. The transept is as high as the central nave. Horizontally, it does not exceed the aisles. In the crossing, the interior extends upward into an octagonal dome. The nave and the aisle, covered with barrel vaults, end with three apses.

The church has four entrances, one in the north, one in the west and two in the south. However, only two are currently used. The walls have a solid appearance, with the few windows enclosed in rounded arches. All the four sides are topped by some 300 modillions with human, animals and fantastic figures, including some erotic scenes. Above the main portal is a chrismon with six arms.

One of the most remarkable facts of Frómista's sculpture is that the famous "Maestro de la Orestíada", also called "Maestro de Jaca-Frómista", worked on it. This author was inspired by a Roman sepulchre coming from the nearby Palencia town of Husillos, which today is exhibited in the National Archaeological Museum of Madrid. The result is that his sculptures -of great plastic quality- partially recover the naturalism and perfection of the naked human body typical of classical Greco-Roman sculpture. In addition to the Maestro de la Orestíada, several sculptors worked in the workshop with different techniques, although the homogeneity of the whole is not lost.

The interior is on a basilical plan, with four bays separated by piers. The naves are separate by relatively low arcades. The central nave has no clerestory. As the barrel vaults of central nave and transept begin just at the top level of those of the aisles. that way, the building is a pseudobasilica.

The apses have several medieval sculptures, including a 13th-century Christ in the nave. Some of the capitals have motifs of plant life, human figures or depictions of stories, such as that of Adam and Eve or the Fox and the Grapes.

== Gallery ==
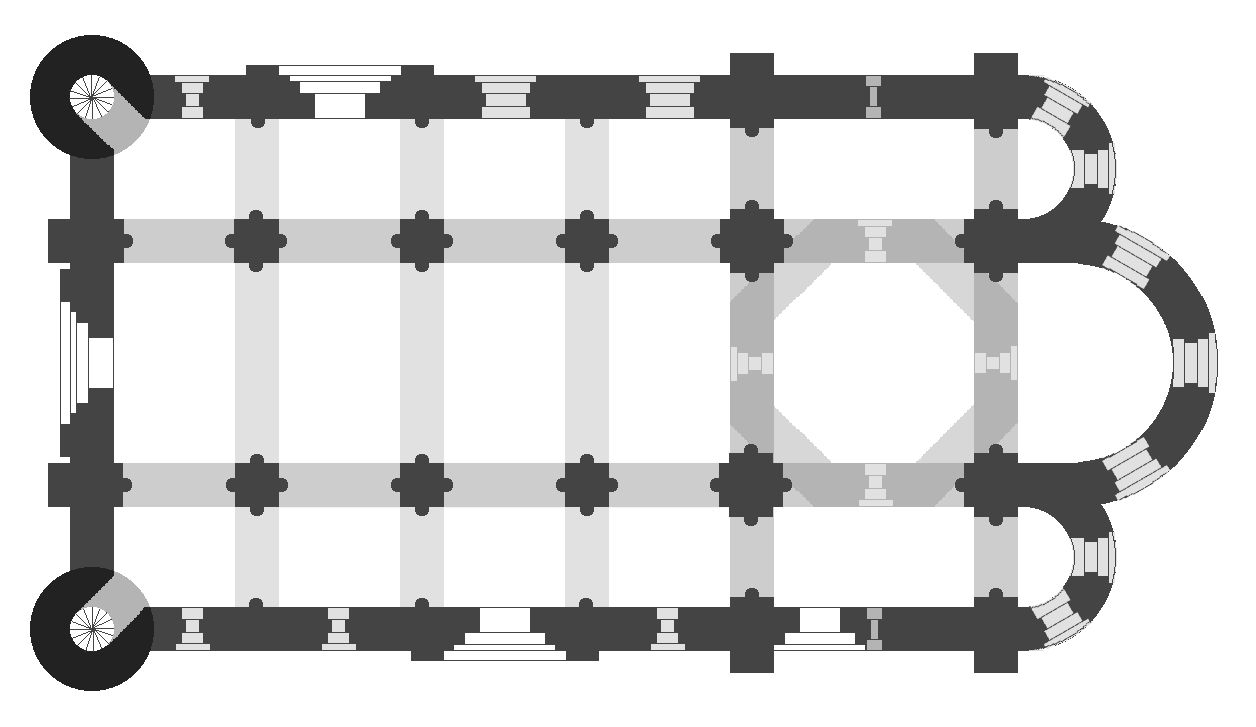
Plan

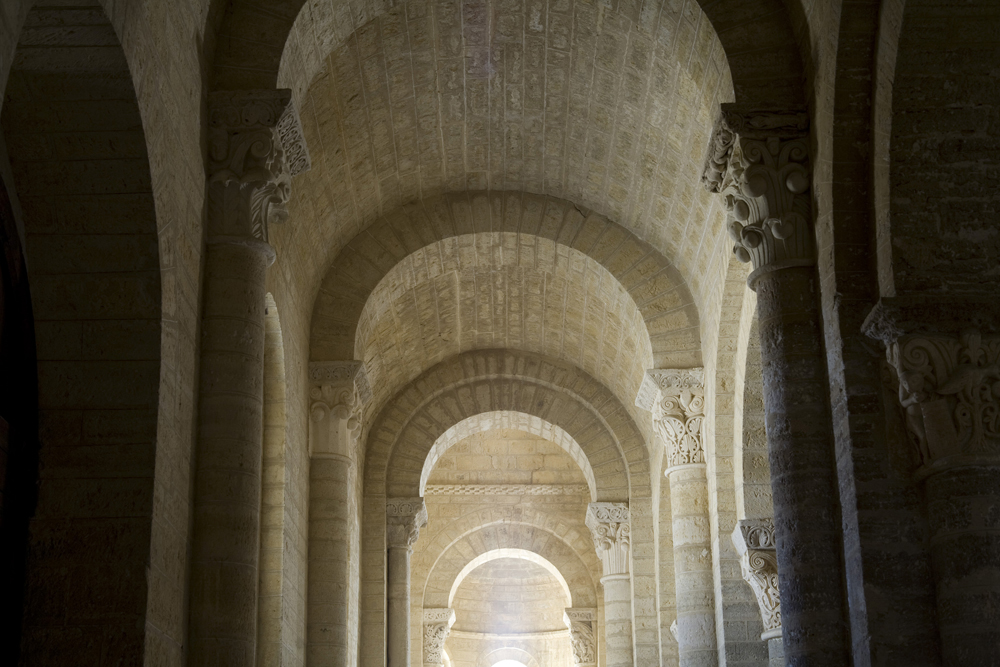
Left aisle

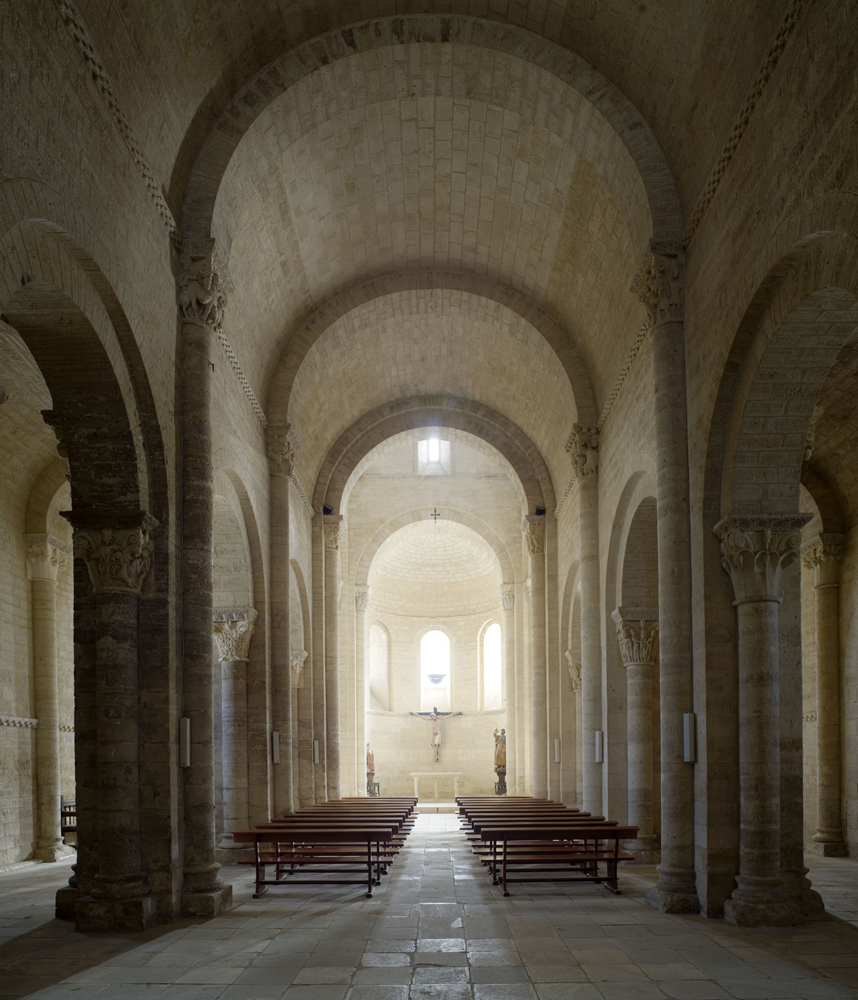
Central nave

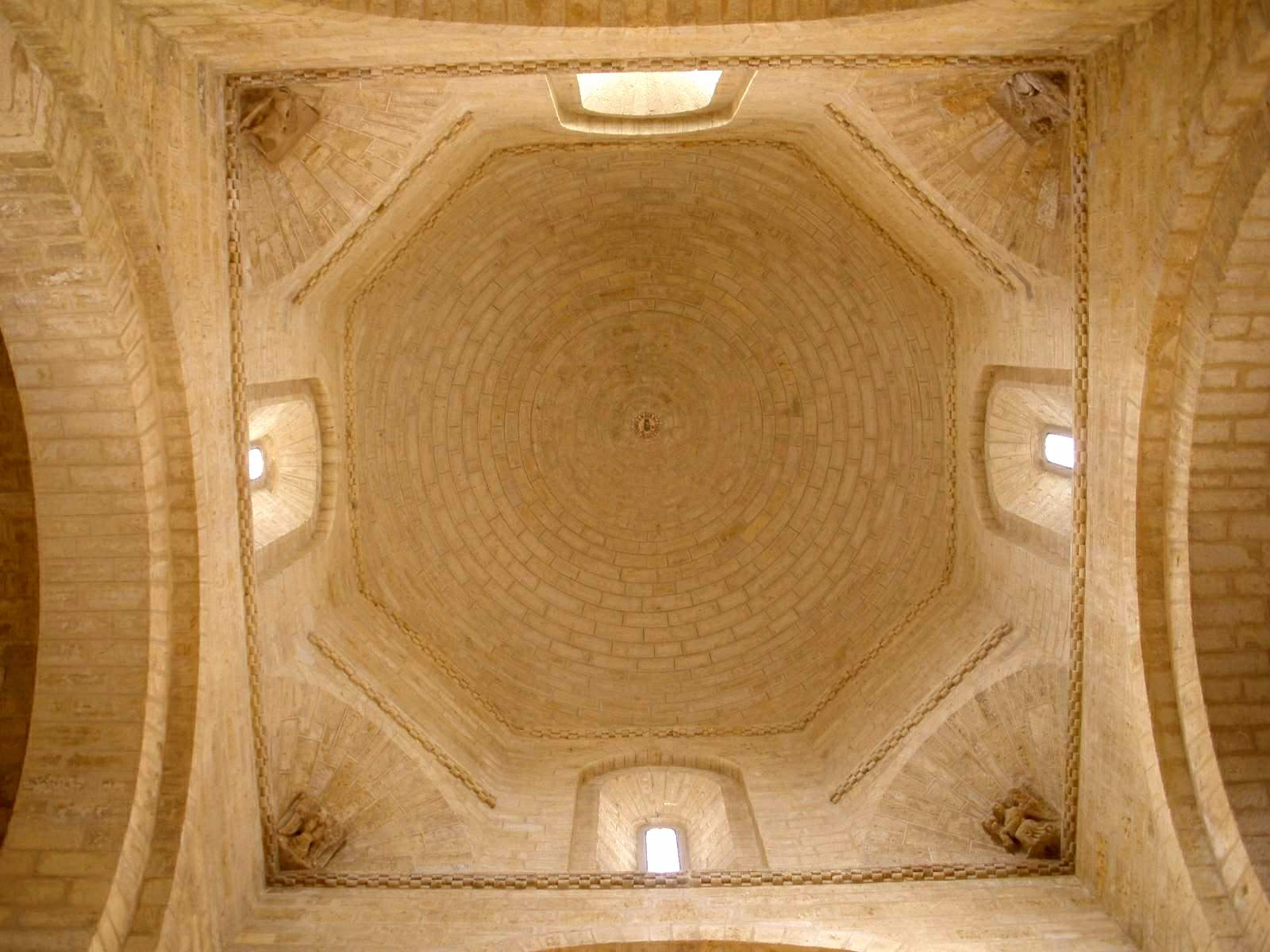
Crossing tower

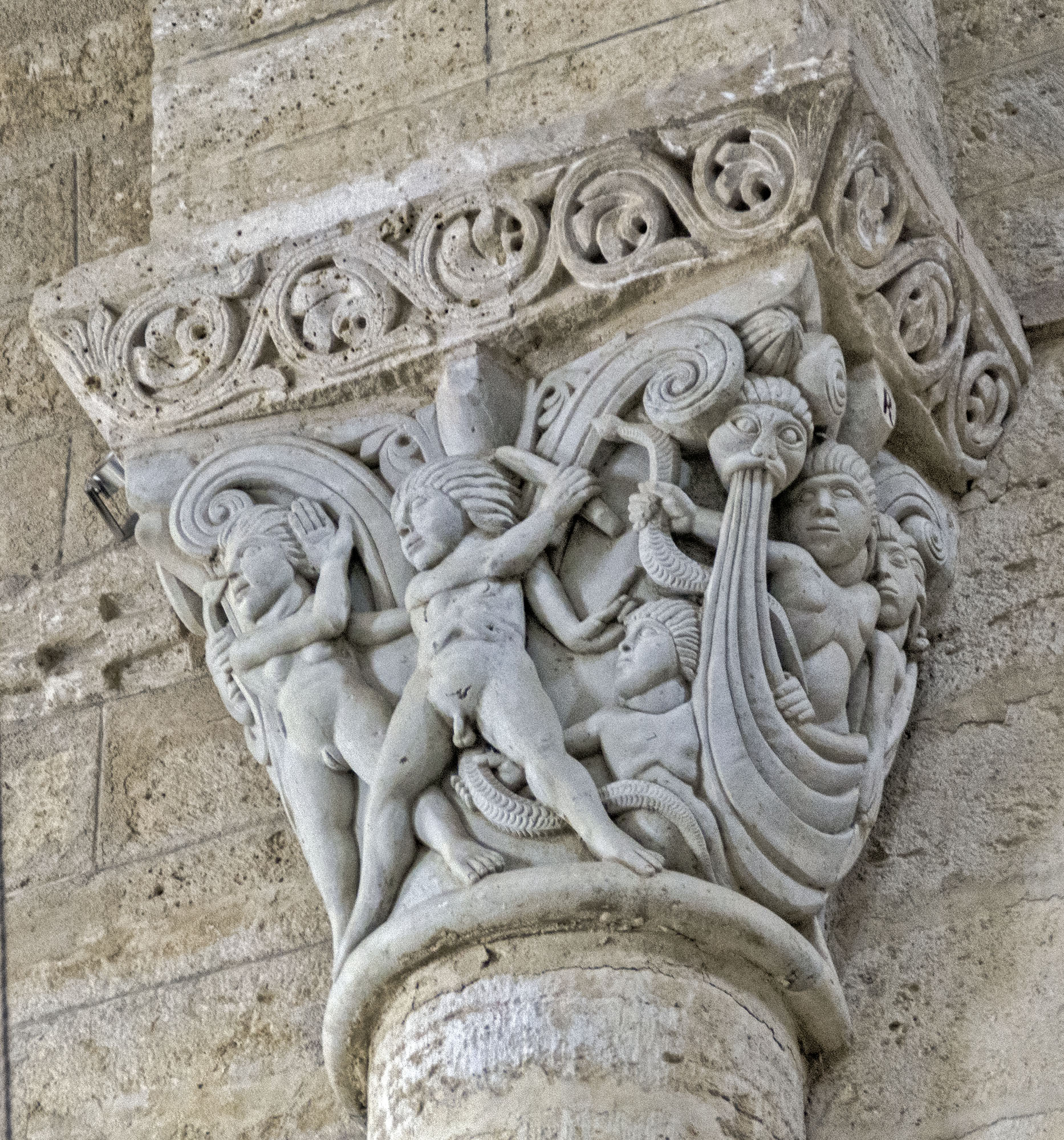
Capital

== Sources ==
Lagunilla, Ramón (2010). San Zoilo de Carrión en el origen del románico pleno. El románico de las donnas. ISBN 978-84-613-9059-5.
