= Our Lady Star of the Sea and St Winefride, Amlwch =

Coordinates: 53.411596°N 4.351442°W

Our Lady Star of the Sea and St Winefride
- Mair, Seren Y Mor a Santes Wenfrewi
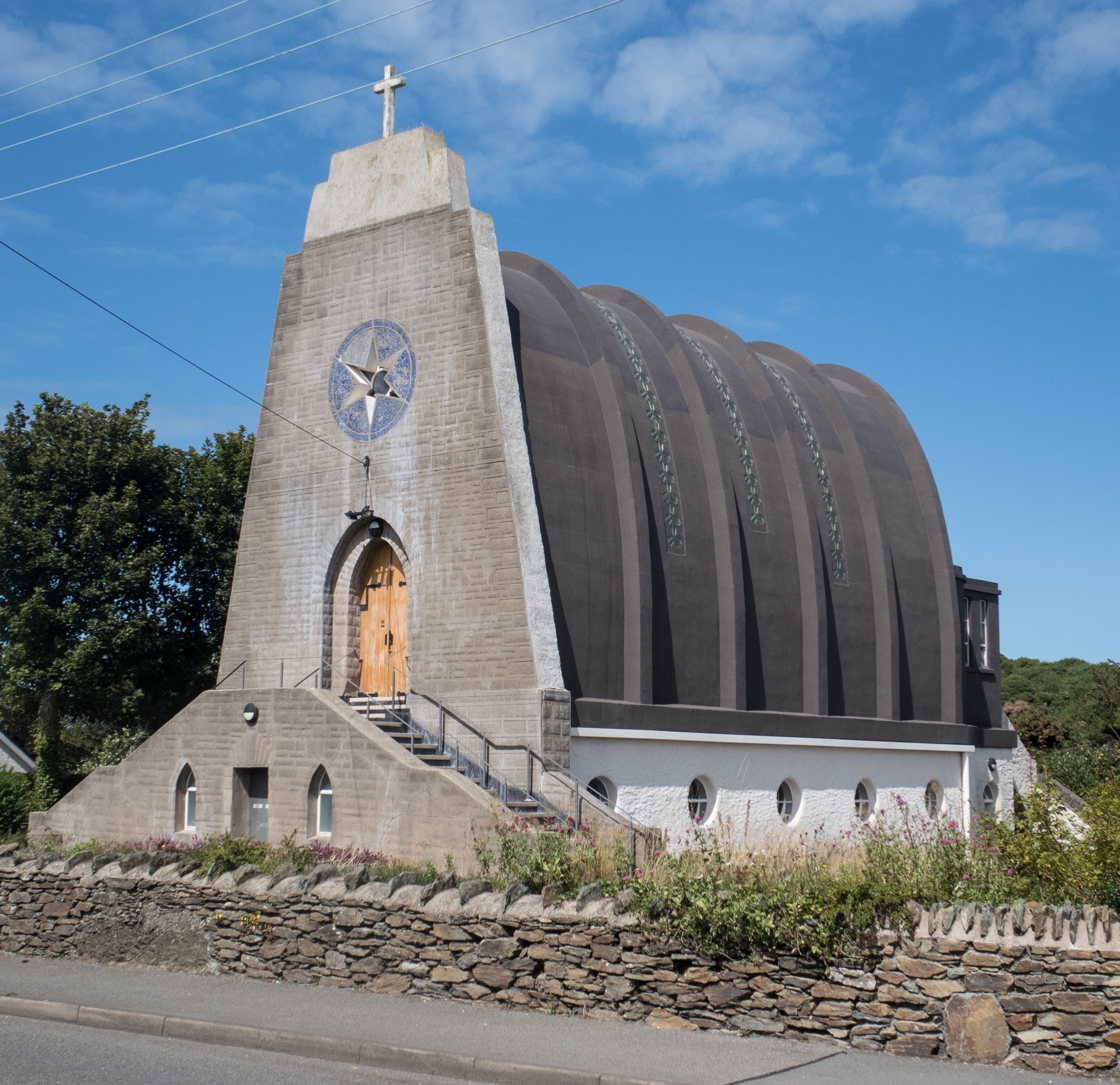

- Location in Anglesey
- Location: Amlwch, Anglesey
- Country: Wales, United Kingdom
- Denomination: Roman Catholic

History
- Status: Parish church
- Founded: 1932 (construction started)
- Dedication: St Mary (Our Lady, Star of the Sea) and St Winefride
- Consecrated: 1937

Architecture
- Functional status: Active
- Heritage designation: Grade II*
- Designated: 12 December 2000
- Architect: Giuseppe Rinvolucri
- Architectural type: Church

Specifications
- Materials: Reinforced concrete

Administration
- Archdiocese: Archdiocese of Cardiff
- Diocese: Diocese of Wrexham
- Deanery: Caernarfon Deanery
- Parish: Amlwch

Clergy
- Priest(s): Fr Frank Murray, Fr Joe Daly

Our Lady Star of the Sea and St Winefride (Welsh: Mair, Seren Y Mor a Santes Wenfrewi) is a Roman Catholic church in Amlwch, a town on the island of Anglesey, north Wales. It was built in the 1930s to a design by an Italian architect, Giuseppe Rinvolucri, using reinforced concrete. The church is loosely in the shape of an upturned boat, possibly reflecting Amlwch's maritime heritage (a similar example is found in Lima, Peru, but is not held to be an upturned boat), and is dedicated to Our Lady, Star of the Sea (a title of St Mary) and St Winefride, a Welsh saint.

The church is a Grade II* listed building, a designation given to "particularly important buildings of more than special interest", because it is a "remarkable inter-war church", built to "a highly unusual and experimental design". The Twentieth Century Society has called it "a rare and unique church", and it has also been called "one of Britain's most avant-garde churches".

== Location and history ==
The church is on the A5025 road, about 0.5 miles (0.8 km) to the west of Amlwch, a town on the north coast of Anglesey, Wales. It is dedicated to St Mary (under the title Our Lady, Star of the Sea) and to St Winefride, a 7th-century Welsh noblewoman who is also venerated at St Winefride's Well, Flintshire. Construction of the church began in 1932, when the foundations were excavated. It was completed in 1937, and the church was consecrated in the same year. The architect was Giuseppe Rinvolucri, an Italian engineer from Piedmont, who settled in Conwy, north Wales, because his English wife was suffering from tuberculosis. His specialist field was the design of Roman Catholic churches, and other – more conventional – examples of his work can be found in Abergele and Porthmadog, also in north Wales.

The church is part of Caernarfon Deanery within the Diocese of Wrexham. The parish of Amlwch and Benllech also includes the church Our Lady of Lourdes, Benllech.

Damage from the weather and deterioration in the concrete meant that the church closed for worship in 2004, requiring worshippers to attend services elsewhere on Anglesey. Demolition was a possibility in 2006. An appeal launched raised the estimated £1.2 million to £1.4 million necessary for repairs, which included replacing the roof coverings, redecorating internally and externally, and repairing the steps. An application for planning permission for the work was submitted in May 2008 to the Isle of Anglesey County Council. An application for a grant of £840,000 from the Heritage Lottery Fund was rejected on 18 March 2009, with the committee concerned about the proposed new extension (terming it "inappropriate"), although recognising the "high heritage merit" of the proposal. Cadw (the Welsh Assembly Government body responsible for the built heritage of Wales) made a grant of £150,000 in 2007; the National Churches Trust made a grant of £10,000 in June 2010; and other bodies and individuals made donations to the appeal. The church reopened after its restoration on 1 May 2011 with a Mass celebrated by the Bishop of Wrexham, Edwin Regan.

The church is the starting point of a short film, titled Here We Are, by Turner Prize winning artist Elizabeth Price, which was created for the 2025 Liverpool Biennial. The film looks at the inspiration for the church's architecture and goes on to look at other examples of modernist Catholic churches that followed, and examines possible patterns in their creation.

== Architecture and fittings ==
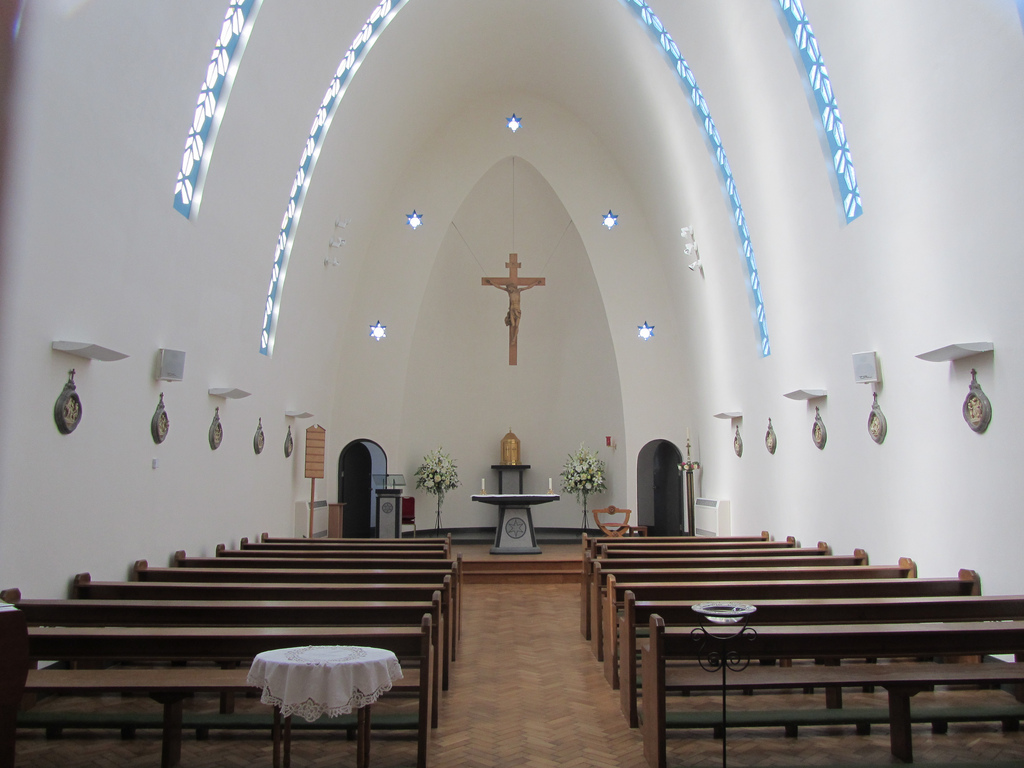
The interior in 2017

Built of reinforced concrete, the building is designed in the style of an upturned boat, and the design has a "nautical theme" with elements such as porthole windows. This is a deliberate reference to Amlwch's history as a port town and its position on the coast. The church has six concrete parabolic arch "ribs" along the outside, with portholes on the base plinth between each rib.

The main entrance is at the south end of the church at the top of some stone steps on either side. A window (shaped, like all the others in the church, like a star) set in mosaic is positioned above the door, and there is a stone cross at the top of the facade. The concrete of the church is dressed with stone on the south side, nearest the main road. The ribs on the outside are visible inside the building; in between them, there are patterns of lights and coloured marble panels on the lower parts of the interior walls. The vestry is to the rear of the church, and there is a parish hall, built from masonry, underneath the church. The altar was replaced in 1995 and again on the reopening of the church in 2011, when a carved crucifix, which was brought to Amlwch from a former convent in Liverpool, was also dedicated. The porch houses a sepulchral slab, dating from the latter half of the 13th century.

== Assessment ==
The church is a Grade II* listed building – the second-highest of the three grades of listing, designating "particularly important buildings of more than special interest". It was given this status on 12 December 2000, and has been listed as "a remarkable inter-war church". Cadw describes it as "striking and individual", and "a highly unusual and experimental design which exploits the plastic qualities of its constructional material to create a powerfully expressive religious building."

A 2006 guide to the churches of Anglesey describes it as "a very impressive building", that "must surely be the most unusual church in Anglesey." A 2009 guide to the buildings of north Wales describes it as "a piece of Italian architectural daring". Referring to the French structural engineer Eugène Freyssinet, who worked with concrete, the guide rhetorically asks, "What inspired this Futurist church, closer to Freyssinet's 1920s airship hangars at Orly, Paris, than to Catholic church design, and so unlike the conservatism of Anglesey building?" Writing before the church reopened, the heritage writer and journalist Simon Jenkins has said that the church was worth a visit for the exterior alone, even though it was closed. He noted the "sweeping parabolic arches, perhaps inspired by airship hangars or by upturned boats in Amlwch harbour", as well as the "bold gable with sloping sides" at the west end, concluding "This church must be saved." It has also been described as "one of Britain's most avant-garde churches". The Twentieth Century Society has said that it is "by far [Rinvolucri's] best work", calling it "a rare and unique church". It noted the "highly individual interpretation of its seaside setting", with a "strikingly modern" parabolic design and a "monumental almost pyramidal aesthetic" at the entrance. A 2011 guide to religious buildings in Wales (written before the church reopened) described it as "most unusual", but added that the fittings were "not worthy of the building". It also noted one writer's words that "no Catholic church (nor any church of another denomination) built in Britain between the wars has the frankly radical character of Amlwch".
