= Joseph Brown (bishop) =

British bishop

The Right Reverend Joseph Brown O.S.B.
- Bishop of Newport and Menevia
- Church: Roman Catholic
- Archdiocese: Newport and Menevia
- Appointed: 29 September 1850
- In office: 1850-1880
- Successor: John Hedley
- Previous post: Vicar Apostolic of Wales District (1840-1850)

Orders
- Ordination: 7 April 1823 by William Poynter
- Consecration: 28 October 1840 by Thomas Griffiths
- Rank: Bishop

Personal details
- Born: Thomas Joseph Brown; 2 May 1798 Bath, Somerset, England
- Died: 12 April 1880 (aged 81)

Styles of Joseph Brown OSB
- Reference style: The Right Reverend
- Spoken style: My Lord or Bishop

Thomas Joseph Brown OSB (called Joseph; 2 May 1798 – 12 April 1880) was a bishop of the Roman Catholic Church. He served for two ecclesiastical jurisdictions, first as the Vicar Apostolic of the Welsh District from 1840 to 1850, then as Bishop of Newport and Menevia from 1850 to 1880.

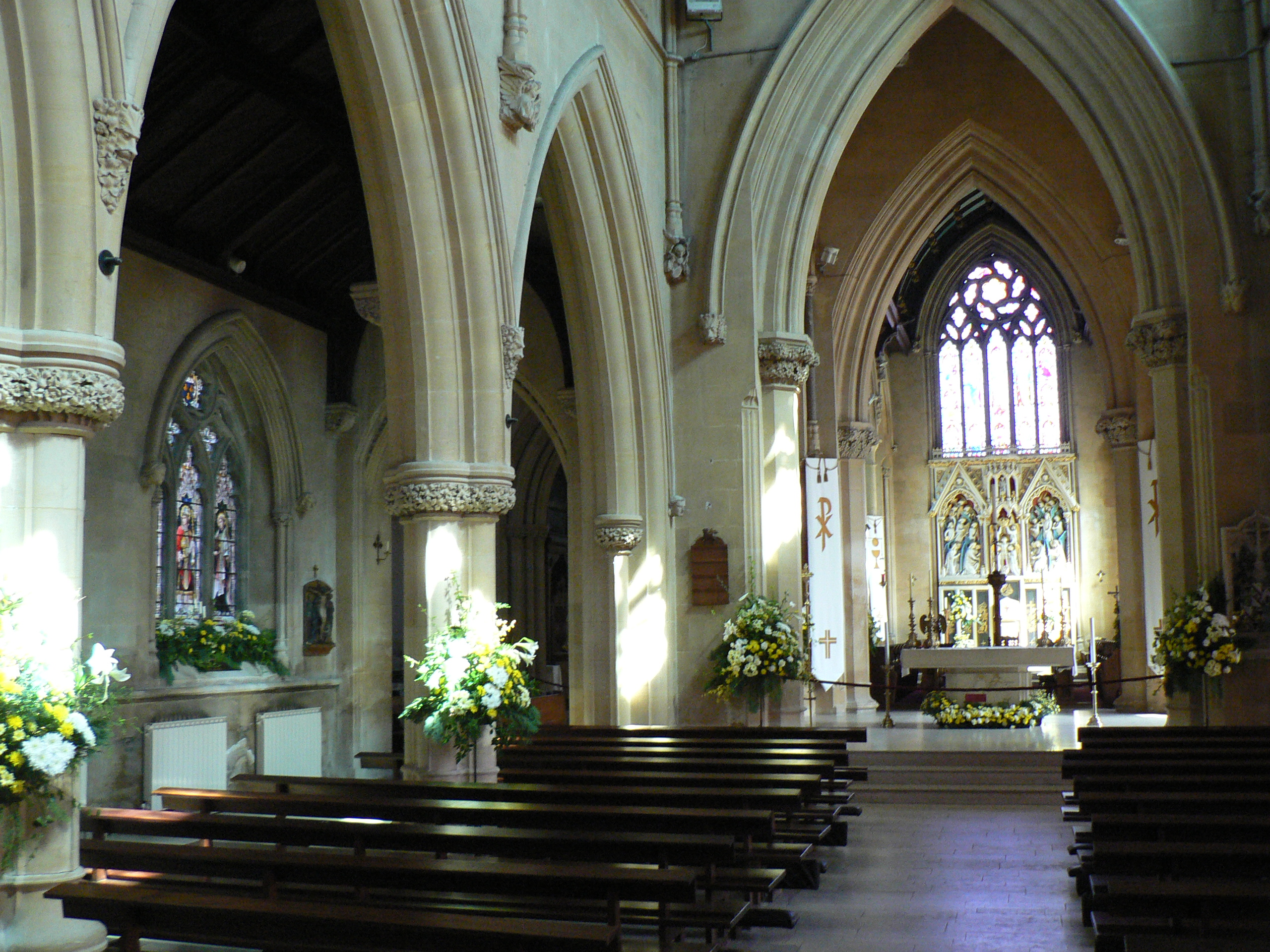
Church of St Michael and All Angels in the Benedictine Belmont Abbey, Herefordshire, a resting place of Bishop Thomas Joseph Brown, O.S.B.

== Life ==
Born in Bath, Somerset on 2 May 1796, Brown was ordained a priest of the Order of Saint Benedict on 12 March 1823. Through reorganisation of the Catholic Church in England and Wales in 1840, the Welsh District was created out of the Western District. Brown was appointed the Vicar Apostolic of the Welsh District and Titular Bishop of Apollonia on 5 June 1840. He was consecrated to the Episcopate on 28 October 1840, the principal consecrator was Bishop Thomas Griffiths (Vicar Apostolic of the London District), and the principal co-consecrators were Bishop William Wareing (Vicar Apostolic of the Eastern District {of England}) and Bishop Bernard Collier (Vicar Apostolic of the Cape of Good Hope.)

On the erection of the Catholic Hierarchy in England and Wales, the Welsh District was divided between the dioceses of Shrewsbury and Newport and Menevia. Brown was appointed the first Bishop of Newport and Menevia on 29 September 1850.

He died in office on 12 April 1880, aged 83 and is buried at the Benedectine Belmont Abbey.

Catholic Church titles
New title	Vicar Apostolic of the Welsh District; 1840–1850	erection of the Catholic Hierarchy in England and Wales
New title	Bishop of Newport and Menevia; 1850–1880	Succeeded by John Hedley
