= John Hedley (bishop) =

British Benedictine, bishop and writer

The Right Reverend John Cuthbert Hedley O.S.B.
- Bishop of Newport
- Church: Roman Catholic
- Archdiocese: Newport
- Appointed: 18 February 1881 (As Bishop of Newport and Menevia)
- In office: 1881–1915
- Predecessor: Joseph Brown
- Previous post: Auxiliary Bishop of Newport and Menevia (1873-1881)

Orders
- Ordination: 19 October 1862 by Robert Cornthwaite
- Consecration: 29 September 1873 by Henry Edward Manning
- Rank: Bishop

Personal details
- Born: 15 April 1837 Morpeth, Northumberland, England
- Died: 11 November 1915 (aged 78)

John Cuthbert Hedley (15 April 1837 – 11 November 1915) was a British Benedictine and writer who held high offices in the Roman Catholic Church.

Born in Morpeth, Northumberland, he was the son of Dr. Edward Astley Hedley and Mary Ann (née Davison) Hedley. He was educated at Mr Gibson's Grammar School and then at Ampleforth College. He was professed a member of the Order of Saint Benedict in 1855 and ordained a priest of the order on 9 October 1862.

He was appointed an auxiliary bishop of Newport and Menevia and Titular Bishop of Caesaropolis on 22 July 1873. His consecration to the Episcopate took place on 29 September 1873, the principal consecrator was Archbishop (later Cardinal) Henry Edward Manning of Westminster, with bishops Brown and Chadwick as co-consecrators. Hedley acted as editor of the Dublin Review in the late 1870s. Prior to assuming the editorship, he had taught philosophy and theology for eleven years at Belmont Abbey, Herefordshire. As editor sought Headley to provide a forum for leading minds to infuse the spirit of Catholicism into literature, history, politics, and art..."

Hedley was appointed the Bishop of the Diocese of Newport and Menevia on 18 February 1881. His episcopal title was changed to Bishop of Newport in 1895. He had served the people well, not least within the field of Catholic Education.

He published a number of works:

- The Christian Inheritance: Set Forth in Sermons
- Lex Levitarum: Or, Preparation for the cure of souls
- Lex Levitarum with the Regula Pastoralis
- The Light of Life: Set Forth in Sermons
- Our Divine Saviour and other Discourses
- A Retreat 33 Discourses with meditation for the Use of the Clergy, Religious, and Others

Bishop Hedley died in office on 11 November 1915, aged 78. After his death, the see of Newport was elevated to an archdiocese and changed its name to Cardiff in 1916.

== Legacy ==
- Bishop Hedley Catholic High School, Merthyr Tydfil

Catholic Church titles
| Preceded by Thomas Joseph Brown | Bishop of Newport and Menevia; 1881–1895 | Title renamed |
| New title | Bishop of Newport; 1895–1915 | Last appointment |
