= St John the Evangelist Church, Banbury =

St John the Evangelist Church
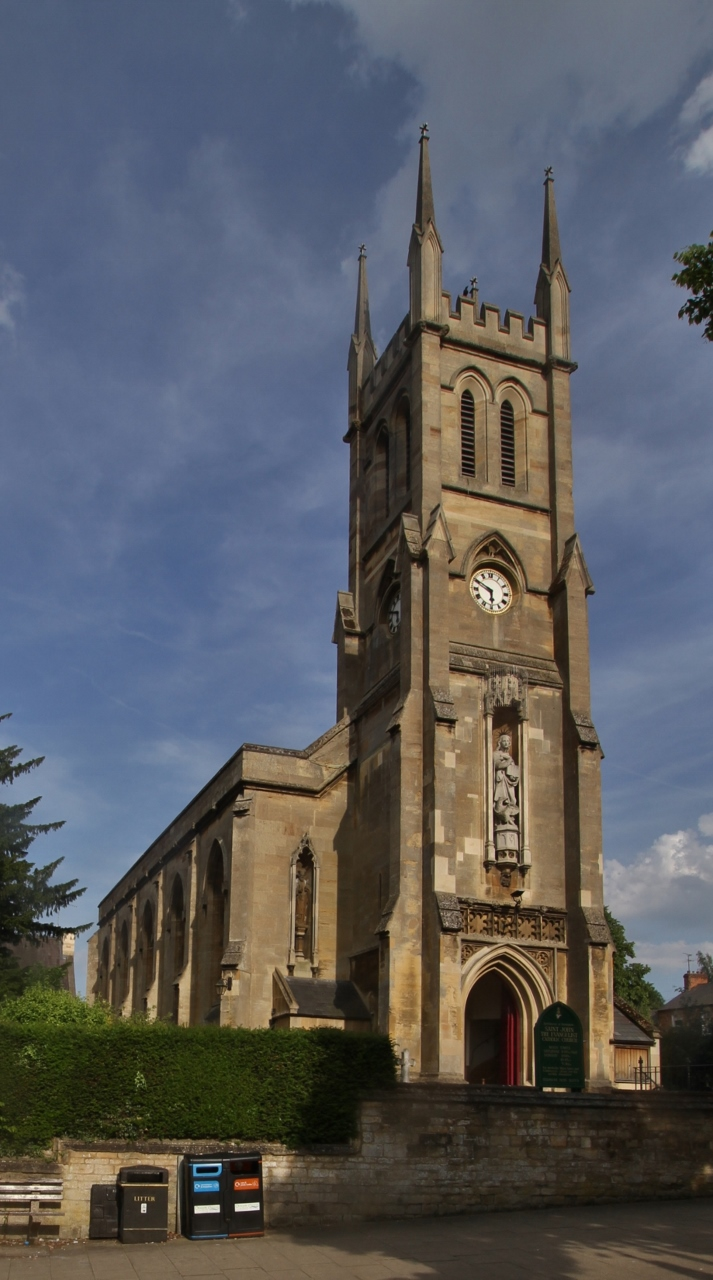
- St John the Evangelist Church
- 52.058°N 1.3397°W
- OS grid reference: SP 45367 40157
- Location: Banbury
- Country: England
- Denomination: Roman Catholic
- Website: BanburyCatholicChurches.org.uk

History
- Status: Parish church
- Founder: Abbé Pierre Hersent
- Dedication: John the Evangelist

Architecture
- Functional status: Active
- Heritage designation: Grade II listed
- Designated: 8 July 1975
- Architect(s): Hickman & Derick; Augustus Pugin
- Style: Gothic Revival
- Groundbreaking: 1835
- Completed: 1838

Administration
- Province: Birmingham
- Archdiocese: Birmingham
- Deanery: Banbury
- Parish: St John the Evangelist

St John the Evangelist Church is a Roman Catholic parish church in Banbury, Oxfordshire, England. It was built from 1835 to 1838 in the Gothic Revival style with parts of it designed by Augustus Pugin. It is located on the corner of South Bar Street and Dashwood Road south of the town centre. It is a Grade II listed building.

== History ==
=== Foundation ===
After the Reformation, Catholics could go to a chapel in Warkworth Castle to celebrate Mass. It was home to the Holman family and then the Eyre family. In 1806, the castle was demolished and a chapel was built in Overthorpe, Northamptonshire. In 1828, a mission was started in Banbury by the priest at Overthorpe, Abbé Pierre Hersent.

=== Construction ===
Abbé Pierre Hersent bought the site of the current church, the old Calthorpe Manor House. He died in 1833, and the church was built by his successors, Fr Joseph Fox and Dr William Tandy. Building lasted from 1835 to 1838. The church was designed by Oxford-based architects, Charles Randall Hickman and John Macduff Derick. Derick also designed Holy Trinity Church, Chipping Norton. John Talbot, 16th Earl of Shrewsbury provided the stone for the construction of the church, the organ, and the tower clock, originally made by W. Allam of London in 1762. In 1839, Dr William Tandy paid Augustus Pugin to design the presbytery, chancel and its fittings, and stained glass.

=== Developments ===
In 1847, Dr William Tandy invited the Sisters of Saint Paul of Chartres to create a community in Banbury, buying St John's Priory for them. The community became the motherhouse of the sisters in the UK until it moved to St Paul's Convent in Selly Park. In 1933, the original tower clock was replaced. In June 1938, a refurbishment was completed, with statues added to the church designed by Richard Lockwood Boulton.

== Parish ==
St John the Evangelist Church is its own parish and works with the nearby parish of St Joseph the Worker Church in Bretch Hill and St Thomas of Canterbury Church in Wroxton. St John the Evangelist Church has three Sunday Masses at 4:00pm on Saturday and at 8:45am and 11:15am on Sunday. St Joseph the Worker Church also has three Sunday Masses at 6:00pm on Saturday and at 10:00am and 5:30pm on Sunday.

== Interior ==
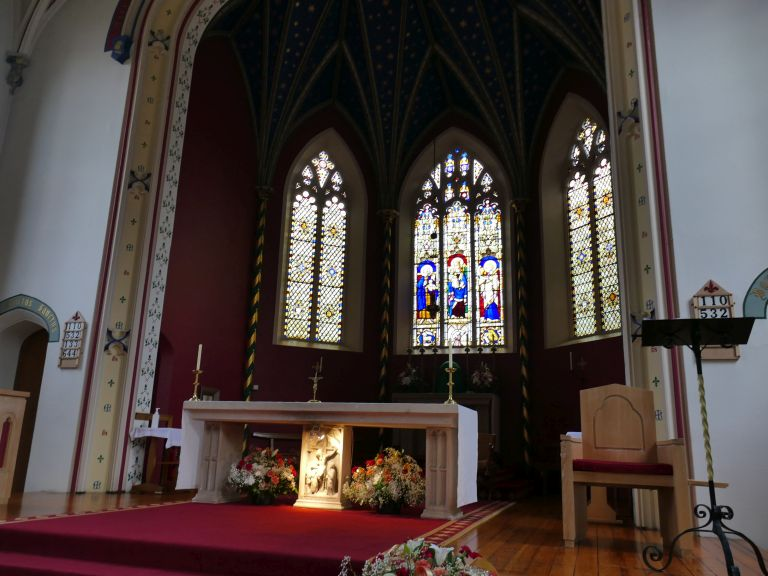
Chancel

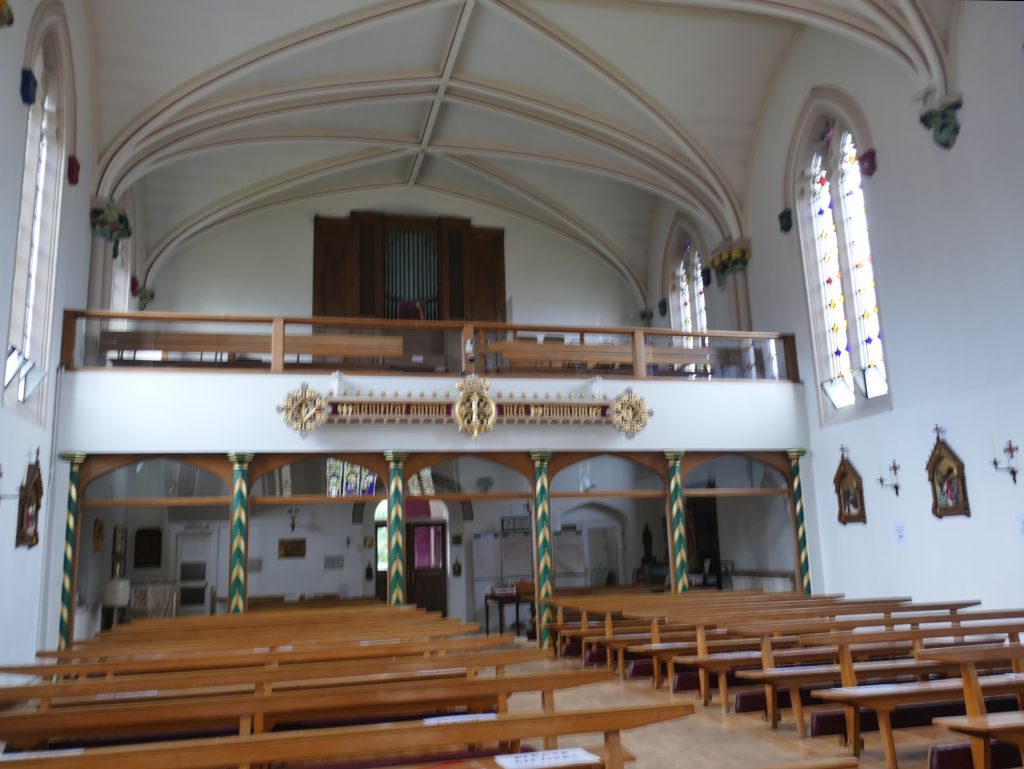
Organ

== See also ==
- Holy Trinity Church, Chipping Norton
- Archdiocese of Birmingham
