= Saint Nicholas Monastery, Spata =

Greek Orthodox monastery in Achaea, Greece

Saint Nicholas Monastery
- Μονή Αγίου Νικολάου
- Location of the monastery in Greece
- Interactive map of Saint Nicholas Monastery

Monastery information
- Full name: Holy Monastery of Saint Nicholas in Sparta
- Order: Ecumenical Patriarchate of Constantinople
- Denomination: Greek Orthodox Church
- Dedication: Saint Nikolaos
- Celebration: May 10 – Passage of relics; December 6 – Commemoration of death; Pentecost
- Diocese: Metropolis of Elis and Olena

Architecture
- Status: Monastery
- Functional status: Active
- Completion date: 18th century

Site
- Location: Spata, Achaea, Western Greece
- Country: Greece
- Coordinates: 37°59′55″N 21°31′47″E

The Saint Nicholas Monastery (Greek: Μονή Αγίου Νικολάου, romanized: Moni Agiou Nikolaou) is a Greek Orthodox monastery in Spata, Achaea, in the Western region of Greece. The monastery was founded at the end of the 18th century, by a monk of the Monastery of Pammegiston Taxiarchon of Aegialia and of which it was a metochion for several years.

== Overview ==
The monastery is located very close to the homonymous village of the Municipal Unit of Larissos of the West Achaea municipality. It belongs ecclesiastically to the Metropolis of Elis and Olena. The monastery is located at 430 metres (1,410 ft) above sea level, on the low slopes of southern Movri.

The monastery is an important historical and religious monument and a landmark of the region that attracts many pilgrims from Achaea, Elis and elsewhere.

On the occasion of the finding of a miraculous icon, which popular tradition places in the years of iconoclasm, a small church was built for the pilgrims at the beginning of the 19th century and later, in 1875, another larger one was built in its place. According to the tradition of Achaea and Elis, pilgrims head towards the pilgrimage of the Saint on the day of the feast of the passage of the relic. According to tradition and various historical sources, in 1087 the holy relic was moved from Myra in Lycia (modern day Turkey) to Bari in Italy where it was deposited on May 20.

The monastery celebrates three times a year: on December 6, the commemoration of the saint's death; on May 10, more solemnly, the passage of the relics of Saint Nikolaos; and on Pentecost.

== See also ==
- Church of Greece
- List of monasteries in Greece
