= William Placid Morris =

British Catholic Vicar Apostolic of the Cape of Good Hope and Mauritius

William Placid Morris OSB (29 September 1794 – 18 February 1872) was a London-born Roman Catholic bishop.

Morris was ordained a priest of the Order of Saint Benedict on 29 June 1817 and was assigned to missionary work in London, first at the chapel of the Portuguese Embassy in Grosvenor Square, and then, after the closure of that chapel in 1829, in Chelsea. In 1831 he received notice of his appointment as bishop charged with the duty of conducting an Apostolic Visitation into the condition of the Catholic Church on the island of Mauritius where the local clergy had been in conflict with Bishop Edward Bede Slater who, since 1818, had been resident bishop there exercising his duties as Vicar Apostolic of Mauritius and as the first Vicar Apostolic of the Cape of Good Hope. To that end, Morris was appointed Titular Bishop of Troas in October 1831, receiving episcopal ordination on 5 February 1832. His principal consecrator was Bishop James Yorke Bramston assisted by Bishop Peter Augustine Baines, O.S.B., and Bishop Robert Gradwell. The investigation, however, was rendered otiose by the impromptu flight of Slater from Port Louis in June 1832 and his death from exposure a few days later. Instead of investigating Slater, Morris was appointed to succeed him.

== Episcopal ministry ==
Morris (who at all times during this period was resident in Mauritius) was Vicar Apostolic of The Cape of Good Hope, South Africa from 1832 to 1837, and from 1832 until 1840 Vicar Apostolic of Mauritius which, until 1834, included the emergent Australian colonies.

Morris sent his vicar-general William Bernard Ullathorne to Australia in 1833, where Ullathorne quickly realised the necessity for severing all the Australian missions from the jurisdiction of a bishop resident in Mauritius. As a result of Ullathorne's representations, Pope Gregory XVI detached Australia from the Vicariate of Mauritius and established the hierarchy in Australia in 1834. In 1837 the Vicariate of the Cape of Good Hope was likewise detached from the care of Bishop Morris and it, in turn, was confided to Bishop Patrick Griffith.

On Mauritius, Morris fell into a serious dispute with one of his priests which ended with that priest's expulsion from the colony. In reprisal, the expelled priest laid charges against Morris in Rome to which Morris was required to respond. This he did, entrusting various documents to a French bishop for him to lodge with the authorities in Rome. Unhappily for Morris, those documents were never lodged and in 1840 he was peremptorily recalled to Rome and relieved of his post as Vicar Apostolic of Mauritius. He retired to England and until his death in 1872 served in effect as an auxiliary bishop to the first two Cardinal Archbishops of Westminster, Nicholas Wiseman and Henry Edward Manning.

== Resources ==
- Bishop William Placid Morris, O.S.B., Catholic-Hierarchy is defective in many respects. A correct account is to be found in chapters 3 and 7 of volume 1 of "Benedictine Pioneers in Australia" by Henry Norbert Birt, London, Herbert & Daniel (1911) re-issued by Polding Press (n.d.)

== See also ==
- Roman Catholicism in Australia

Preceded by Edward Bede Slater	Vicar Apostolic of Cape of Good Hope {Capo di Buona Speranza}, South Africa; 1832–1837	Succeeded by Patrick Raymond Griffith
Preceded by Caspar Delenda	Titular Bishop of Troas; 1831–1872	Succeeded by Florent Daguin
