= Holy Trinity Church, Chipping Norton =

Coordinates: 51.943656°N 1.538511°W

Holy Trinity Church
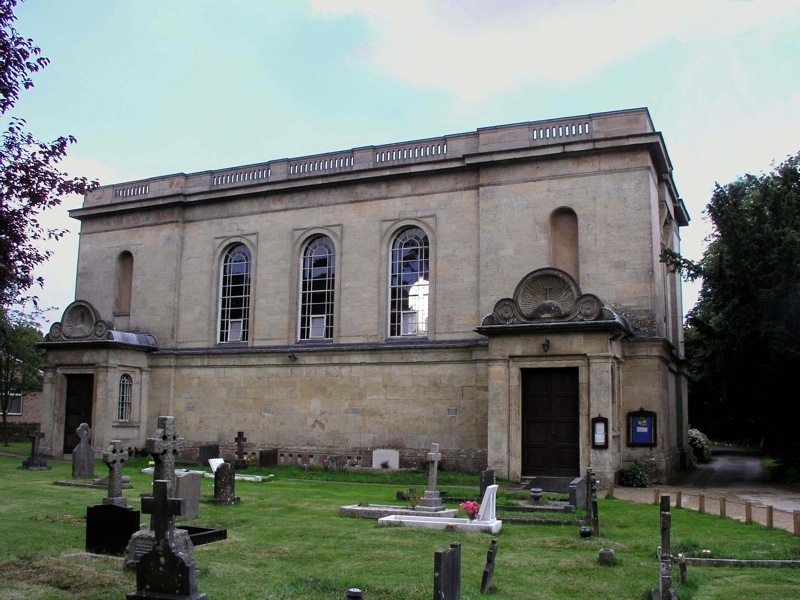
- Church entrance

- Location in Oxfordshire
- OS grid reference: SP 31830 27332
- Location: Chipping Norton, Oxfordshire
- Country: England
- Denomination: Roman Catholic
- Website: BirminghamDiocese.org.uk

History
- Status: Active
- Founded: 1836
- Dedication: Holy Trinity

Architecture
- Functional status: Parish church
- Heritage designation: Grade II listed
- Designated: 23 April 1952
- Architect: John Macduff Derick
- Style: Classical Revival
- Completed: 25 October 1836

Administration
- Province: Birmingham
- Diocese: Birmingham
- Deanery: Banbury

Holy Trinity Church is a historic Catholic parish church in Chipping Norton, Oxfordshire, England. It is situated on the London road near the centre of the town. It was built in 1836 and is a Grade II listed building.

== History ==
It was built in 1836, seven years after the Roman Catholic Relief Act 1829, and fourteen years before the Restoration of the English hierarchy in 1850. As there were no dioceses in England at the time, the church came under the administration of the Vicar Apostolic of the Midland District. It was built in a classical revival style of architecture, similar to Chipping Norton Town Hall.

From 1922 until 1969, Heythrop Park, a country house in the parish, was occupied by the Society of Jesus. During that time, Heythrop Hall was a philosophy and theology college for those studying to become Jesuits. While they were there, the Jesuits also staffed Holy Trinity church. After they left, the church reverted to the care of the Archdiocese of Birmingham, who continue to serve the parish.

In March 2009, Bishop Mark Jabalé, the emeritus Bishop of Menevia and former abbot of Belmont Abbey was made the parish priest.

== Architecture ==
The church is made of rubble stone at the rear side and ashlar to the other sides. There are three round headed windows on either side of the nave of the church. There is a gallery in the west part of the church and a stained glass window behind the altar made in 1873. There are two doorways on the side of the church facing the road, above them are bays in the façade. Above the bays and the windows is a coved cornice. There are porches projecting out at either side with antae, sunburst shells and ammonite scrolls in the stonework.

== Parish ==
There are two Sunday Masses held in the church, one is on Saturday evening at 6:00pm and the other is at 11am Sunday morning. The church has a relationship with the nearby Holy Trinity Catholic School.

== Interior ==
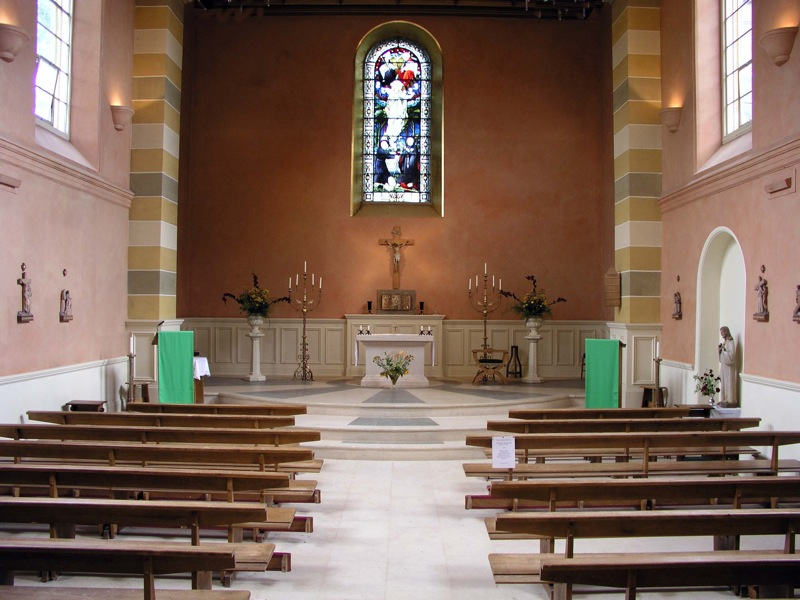
Church interior

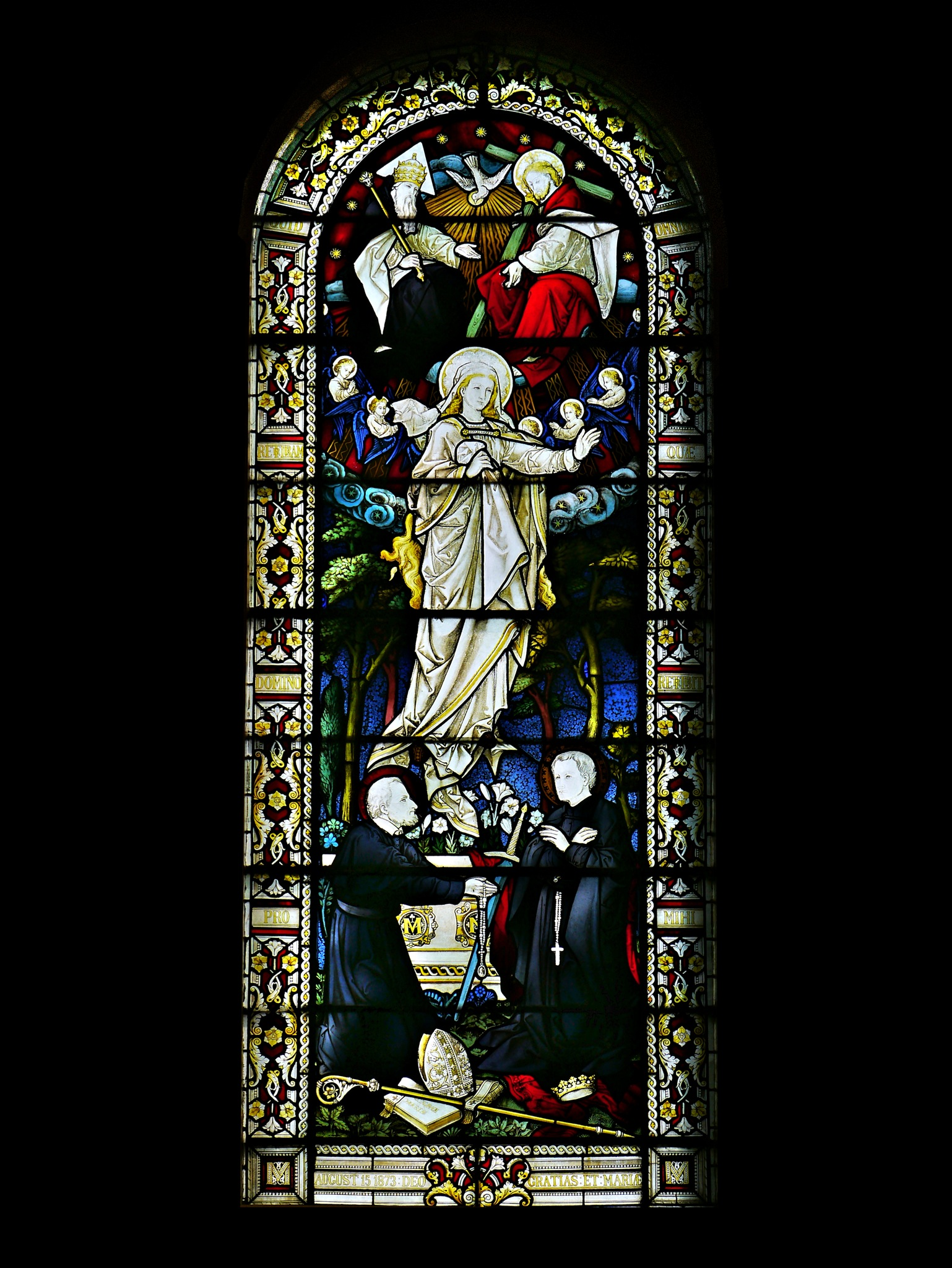
Stained glass window behind the altar

== See also ==
- Chipping Norton
- Heythrop Park
