= Bernard Collier =

Bernard Collier, O.S.B.
- Diocesan Bishop of Port-Louis
- Church: Roman Catholic Church
- Appointed: 14 February 1840 (as Vicar Apostolic); 7 December 1847 (as Diocesan Bishop)
- Term ended: 6 September 1863
- Predecessor: William Placid Morris
- Successor: Michael Adrian Hankinson
- Other posts: Titular Bishop of Milevum (1840–1847); Titular Bishop of Druzipara (1863–1890)

Orders
- Ordination: 1826 (Priest)
- Consecration: 3 May 1840 (Bishop) by Giacomo Filippo Fransoni

Personal details
- Born: William Allen Collier; 1802 Rokery Close, North Yorkshire, United Kingdom
- Died: 21 November 1890 (aged 87–88) Herefordshire, United Kingdom

Bishop Bernard William Allen Collier, O.S.B. (1802 – 21 November 1890) was an English-born Roman Catholic prelate. He was the second Vicar Apostolic and the first Diocesan Bishop of the Roman Catholic Diocese of Port-Louis from 14 February 1840 until his resignation on 6 September 1863.

== Life ==
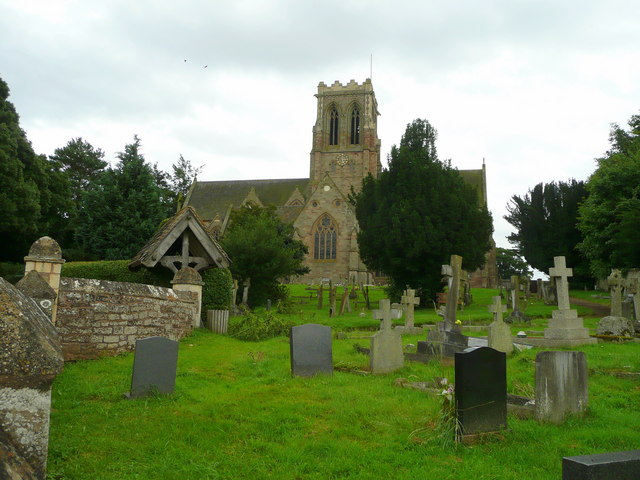
Abbots' Graveyard in the Benedictine Belmont Abbey, Herefordshire, a resting place of Bishop Bernard Collier, O.S.B.

Born in Rokery Close, North Yorkshire, United Kingdom in 1802. After the school education, he subsequently joined the Benedictine Douai Abbey, where he made a profession and was ordained as a priest in 1826, after completed philosophical and theological studies. He served as a procurator general of the English Benedictines to the Holy See in Rome, until his election as bishop.

He was appointed by the Holy See as the second Vicar Apostolic of the Vicariate Apostolic of Mauritius and the Titular Bishop of Milevum on 14 February 1840. He was consecrated to the Episcopate on 3 May 1840. The principal consecrator was Cardinal Giacomo Filippo Fransoni.

After his returning from the missionary work in Mauritius, Bishop Collier was actively included in the service for the Catholics in Herefordshire and Wales. For example, he was a co-founder of the parish in Aberystwyth in 1867.

He died in Herefordshire on 21 November 1890 and was buried at the Abbots' Graveyard in the Benedictine Priory in Belmont.

Catholic Church titles
Preceded by Thomas Coen	Titular Bishop of Milevum; 1840–1847	Succeeded by Jean-Marie Tissot
Preceded by William Placid Morris	Vicar Apostolic of Vicariate Apostolic of Mauritius; 1840–1847	Succeeded by himself as Diocesan Bishop
Preceded by himself as Vicar Apostolic	Bishop of Roman Catholic Diocese of Port-Louis; 1847–1863	Succeeded by Michael Adrian Hankinson
Preceded by José Antonio de la Peña y Navarro	Titular Bishop of Druzipara; 1863–1890	Succeeded by Maxime Decelles
