= Alan Rees (composer) =

Roman Catholic monk, organist, and composer

The Rt Rev Dom Alan Rees OSB ARCO ARCM
- Born: 1 February 1941; Morriston, near Swansea
- Died: 2 October 2005 (aged 64); Belmont Abbey, Herefordshire
- Education: University College Cardiff
- Occupations: Roman Catholic monk, organist, composer
- Title: Abbot of Belmont Abbey, Herefordshire
- Term: 1986–1993
- Predecessor: Jerome Hodkinson
- Successor: Mark Jabalé
- Board member of: Society of Saint Gregory

Abbot Alan William Rees, O.S.B. (1 February 1941 – 2 October 2005) was a Welsh Roman Catholic monk, organist, and composer of choral and organ music. From 1986 to 1993, Rees was abbot of Belmont Abbey, Herefordshire.

== Biography ==
Rees was born in Morriston, near Swansea, to Hilda and John Rees. He attended both an Anglican church with his mother, and a Welsh baptist church with his father. He attended Dynefor Grammar School, and later studied music and education at University College Cardiff.

Rees began a musical career as organist and director of the choir at Cardiff Metropolitan Cathedral, where he worked from 1963 until 1968. He then began a novitiate at Belmont Abbey, became a monk four years later, and was ordained two years later. He directed the music there, and taught at the school. He became abbot of the abbey in 1986, a position he held until he resigned in 1993 due to the pressures of the role and his mental health. He was the ninth person to hold the position.

Rees died suddenly after a fall in 2005. The coroner recorded a death of suicide, as he likely jumped from a landing. Rees had suffered from depression for much of his life, and attempted suicide the year before.

== Selected compositions ==
- English Mass
- Congress Mass, for the National Pastoral Congress in Liverpool, 1980
- Cardiff Mass, for Pope John Paul II's visit to Britain, 1982
- "A Winter Rose", carol

Catholic Church titles
Preceded by Jerome Hodkinson	Abbot of Belmont Abbey; 1986–1993	Succeeded by Mark Jabalé
