= Metropolis of Elis and Olena =

The Metropolis of Elis and Olena (Greek: Ιερά Μητρόπολις Ηλείας και Ωλένης) is a Greek Orthodox episcopal see of the Church of Greece. During the period of Frankish rule it was a Roman Catholic see, and continues to the present day as a titular see in the Roman Catholic Church.

== History ==
Olena (Ὤλενα, today Oleni) became an episcopal see in Byzantine times, being recorded as the see of Bolaina (Βολαίνα) since the 9th century in the Notitiae Episcopatuum of the Patriarchate of Constantinople. It was probably established after the reconquest of the Peloponnese from the Slavs, and was a suffragan of the Metropolis of Patras.

The see remains attested in the Notitiae until the 13th century, but following the Latin conquest of the Peloponnese and the establishment of the Principality of Achaea, it was taken over by a Roman Catholic bishop. On the demand of Prince Geoffrey I of Villehardouin, however, its seat was moved to Andravida, the Principality's capital. The Latin bishops, who remained suffragans of the Latin Archbishop of Patras, resided there until the decline of the Principality, when the region became depopulated; they then moved to Kaminitsa near Patras.

The Latin see was suppressed when the Principality was conquered by the Despotate of the Morea in 1430, and a Greek Orthodox residential bishop once again took up seat there.

In Ottoman times, the see was variously based at Gastouni and Pyrgos. Following Greek independence, the vacant see was merged with the Metropolis of Patras, into the Archbishopric of Patras and Elis. In 1899, the Bishopric of Elis became independent, and was promoted to metropolitan see in 1922.

== Residential bishops ==
Latin rule

- Guglielmo (1246.05.06 – ?)
- Giullaume de Pontoise, Benedictines (O.S.B.) (1258 – death 1263.12.18)
- Niccolò (1285.09.30 – ?)
- Giovanni Muto dei Papazzurri (1297.12.23 – 1300.02.06), later Bishop of Imola (Italy) (1300.02.06 – 1302.08.03), Bishop of Rieti (Italy) (1302.08.03 – death 1339)
- Leonard (1300.03.26 – ?)
- Aimone, O.S.B. (1310? – 1313.01.13), later Bishop of Arba (1313.01.13 – 1317?)
- James (1313? – ?)
- John (1330? – ?)
- Francesco (1333.03.18 – ?)
- Lodovico della Torre (1349.03.30 – 1357.05.17), later Bishop of Corone (1357.05.17 – 1359.05.10), Patriarch of Aquileia (Italy) (1359.05.10 – 1365)
- Francesco (1357.05.26 – ?)
- Archbishop-Bishop Pietro da Piacenza, Friars Minor (O.F.M.) (1362.03.04 – ?), previously Archbishop of Smyrna (now Izmir, Turkey) (1358.01.31 – 1362.03.04)
- Matthew (1370.03.27 – ?)
- Ludovico (1388.07.24 – ?)
- Antonio da Macerata, Augustinians (O.E.S.A.) (1391.08.11 – ?)
- Theodore of Costantinople, Dominican Order (O.P.) (1418.04.10 – 1421?)

Orthodox see restored

- Philaretos (? – 1821)
- Damaskenos Spiliotopoulos (1901–1918)
- Antonios Politis (1922–1945)
- Germanos I Goumas (1945–1968)
- Athanasios I Vasilopoulos (1968–1981)
- Germanos II Paraskevopoulos (1981–2022)
- Athanasios II Bachos (2022–present)

== Roman Catholic titular holders ==
The see is currently vacant, having had the following non-consecutive incumbents, all of the lowest (episcopal) rank :

- Pierre de l’Abbé (1519.04.13 – ?)
- Raimondo Lezzoli, Dominican Order (O.P.) (1696.10.20 – 1706.01.18)
- Michael Portier (1825.08.26 – 1829.05.15)
- Thomas Griffiths (1833.07.30 – 1847.08.12)
- Sébastien-Théophile Neyret (1848.03.31 – 1862.11.05)
- Agustín Cecilio Gómez de Carpena y Bolio (1864.09.22 – 1868.10.05)
- Jean-Marcel Touvier, Lazarists (C.M.) (1869.11.29 – 1888.08.04)
- Fr. Pio Claudio Nesi, Friars Minor (O.F.M.) (1901.04.22 – 1901.05.02)
- Joseph Robert Cowgill (1905.09.26 – 1911.06.07)
- Luís Silva Lezaeta (1912.01.05 – 1928.02.03)
- Paul Wang Wen-cheng (王文成) (1929.12.02 – 1946.04.11)
- Clemente Geiger, Missionaries of the Precious Blood (C.PP.S.) (1948.01.17 – 1995.06.14)

== Sources ==
- Bon, Antoine (1969). La Morée franque. Recherches historiques, topographiques et archéologiques sur la principauté d'Achaïe (in French). Paris: De Boccard.
