= James Bramston (bishop) =

English-born bishop

The Right Reverend James Yorke Bramston
- Vicar Apostolic of the London District
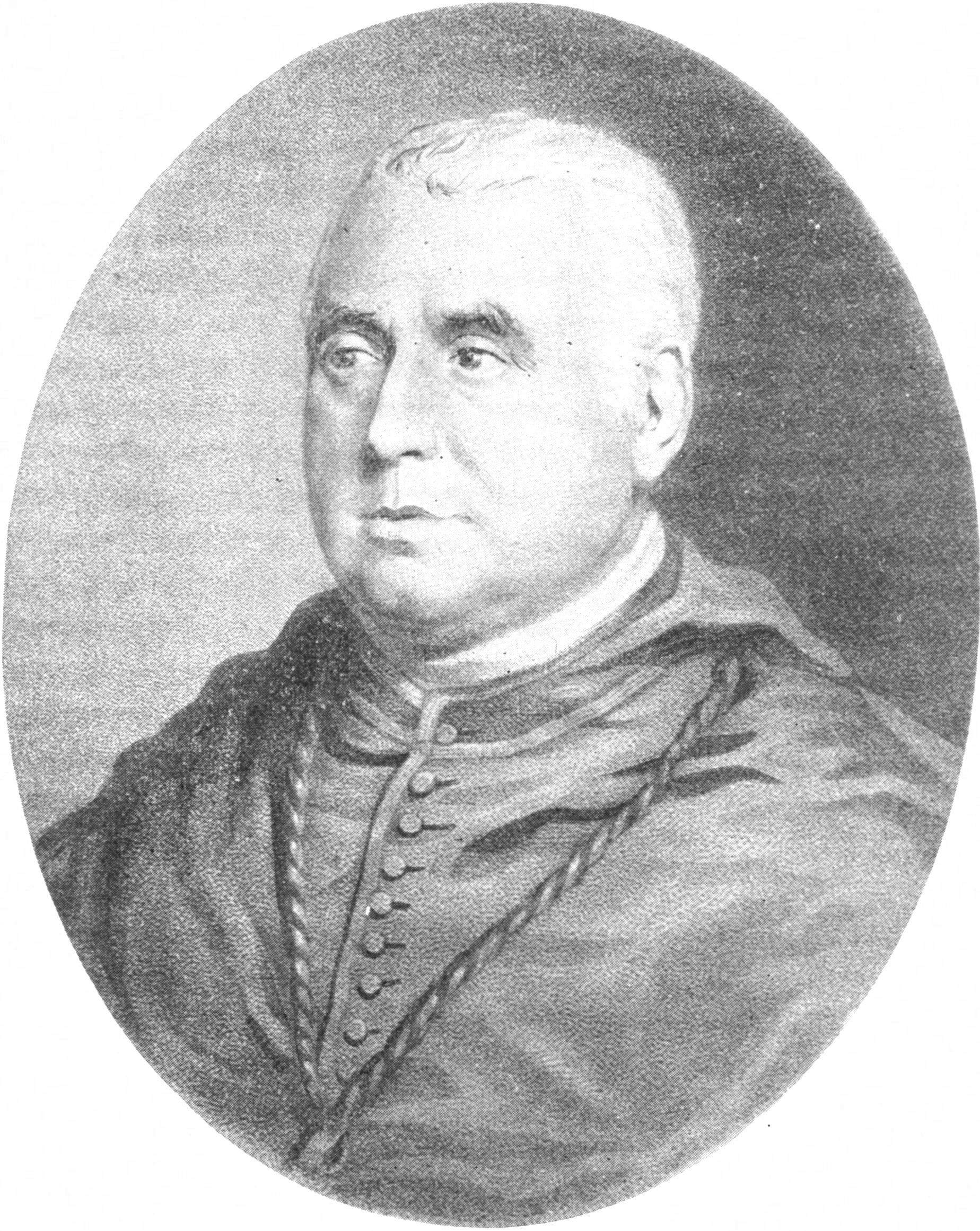
- See: London District
- Appointed: 4 February 1823 (Coadjutor)
- Installed: 26 November 1827
- Term ended: 11 July 1836
- Predecessor: William Poynter
- Successor: Thomas Griffiths
- Other post: Titular Bishop of Usula

Orders
- Ordination: 1801
- Consecration: 29 June 1823 by William Poynter

Personal details
- Born: 15 March 1763 Oundle, Northamptonshire, England
- Died: 11 July 1836 (aged 73) London, England
- Denomination: Roman Catholic
- Education: English College, Lisbon

James Yorke Bramston (15 March 1763 – 11 July 1836) was an English Catholic prelate who served as Vicar Apostolic of the London District from 1827 until his death in 1836.

== Biography ==
Born in Oundle, Northamptonshire, Bramston was educated at Oundle School and Lincoln's Inn, where he studied for nearly four years under the Roman Catholic conveyancer Charles Butler, and became a lawyer.

Following his conversion to Catholicism in 1790, he studied theology at the English College, Lisbon and was ordained a priest in 1801. Then he worked as a missionary in the apostolic vicariates of the Midland District and the London District, of which he became vicar general in 1812.

On 4 February 1823, Bramston was appointed Coadjutor Vicar Apostolic of the London District and Titular Bishop of Usula by Pope Pius VII. He received his episcopal consecration on the following 29 June from Bishop William Poynter, with Bishops Peter Collingridge, O.F.M., and Peter Augustine Baines, O.S.B., serving as co-consecrators. He succeeded Bishop Poynter as Vicar Apostolic of the London District upon the latter's death on 26 November 1827.

In 1834, in his private chapel in London, Bramston consecrated as a bishop the Benedictine Bede Polding, vicar apostolic of New Holland, Van Diemen's Land and the adjoining islands,

By 1835, London contained 16 churches, 35 priests, and 150,000 Catholics.

Bramston died at the age of 73, on 11 July 1836. His funeral Mass was held at St. Mary's Church in Moorfields, where he was buried; his heart, however, was interred at St Edmund's College, Ware.

Catholic Church titles
Preceded by William Poynter	Vicar Apostolic of the London District; 1827–1836	Succeeded by Thomas Griffiths
