= Thomas Griffiths (bishop) =

English Roman Catholic bishop

The Right Reverend Thomas Griffiths
- Vicar Apostolic of the London District
- Appointed: 30 July 1833 (Coadjutor)
- Installed: 11 July 1836
- Term ended: 12 August 1847
- Predecessor: James Yorke Bramston
- Successor: Thomas Walsh
- Other post: Titular Bishop of Olena

Orders
- Ordination: 1814
- Consecration: 28 October 1833 by James Yorke Bramston

Personal details
- Born: 22 June 1791 London, England
- Died: 12 August 1847 (aged 56)
- Denomination: Roman Catholic

Thomas Griffiths (2 June 1791 – 19 August 1847) was an English Catholic prelate who served as Vicar Apostolic of the London District from 1836 until his death.

== Life ==
=== St. Edmund's College, Old Hall ===
Griffiths was born in London, and was the first and only Vicar Apostolic of the London District educated wholly in England. At the age of thirteen he was sent to St. Edmund's College, Old Hall, where he went through the whole course, and was ordained priest in 1814. Four years later he was chosen as president, at the age of 27. He ruled the college for fifteen years, and did much to give the college a sound financial basis.

=== Vicar Apostolic ===
He was then appointed coadjutor to Bishop Bramston, then Vicar Apostolic of the London District. He was consecrated as Titular Bishop of Olena at St. Edmund's College, 28 October 1833. Within three years Bishop Bramston died, and Bishop Griffiths succeeded him.

A biographical sketch by one of his priests describes Griffiths as "...silent, meditative, bland, inoffensive, ever too happy to serve and oblige everyone; patient, enduring, forgiving; unmoved by slights, unkindness, or even insults -a man after God's own heart, full of faith, of hope, of love; not one thing today and another tomorrow, but ever consistent and the same."

The agitation for a regular Catholic hierarchy in England became more and more pronounced and as a preliminary measure, in 1840, the four ecclesiastical "districts" into which England had been divided since the reign of James II of England were subdivided to form eight, Dr. Griffiths retaining the new London District. Soon after this, the Oxford Movement and attendant Catholic conversions began: and the immigration of Irish Catholics grew. At the same time the growth of the British colonies, many of which had been until lately ruled as part of the London District, brought him into contact with the government. In all these spheres Griffiths discharged his duties with practical ability; but it was thought that he would not have the breadth of view or experience necessary for initiating the new hierarchy, and (according to Bishop Ullathorne) this was the reason why its establishment was postponed.

When Griffiths died, somewhat unexpectedly, in 1847 Ullathorne himself preached the funeral sermon. The body of the deceased prelate was laid temporarily in the vaults of Moorfields Church; but two years later it was removed to St. Edmund's College, where a new chapel by Augustus Pugin was in course of erection, and a special chantry was built to receive the body of Griffiths, to whose initiative the chapel was due. An oil painting of Griffiths is at Archbishop's House, Westminster; another, more modern, at St. Edmund's College.

Catholic Church titles
Preceded by James Yorke Bramston	Vicar Apostolic of the London District; 1836–1847	Succeeded by Thomas Walsh
