= Belmont Abbey, Herefordshire =

Belmont Abbey
- Abbey Church of St Michael and All Angels, Hereford
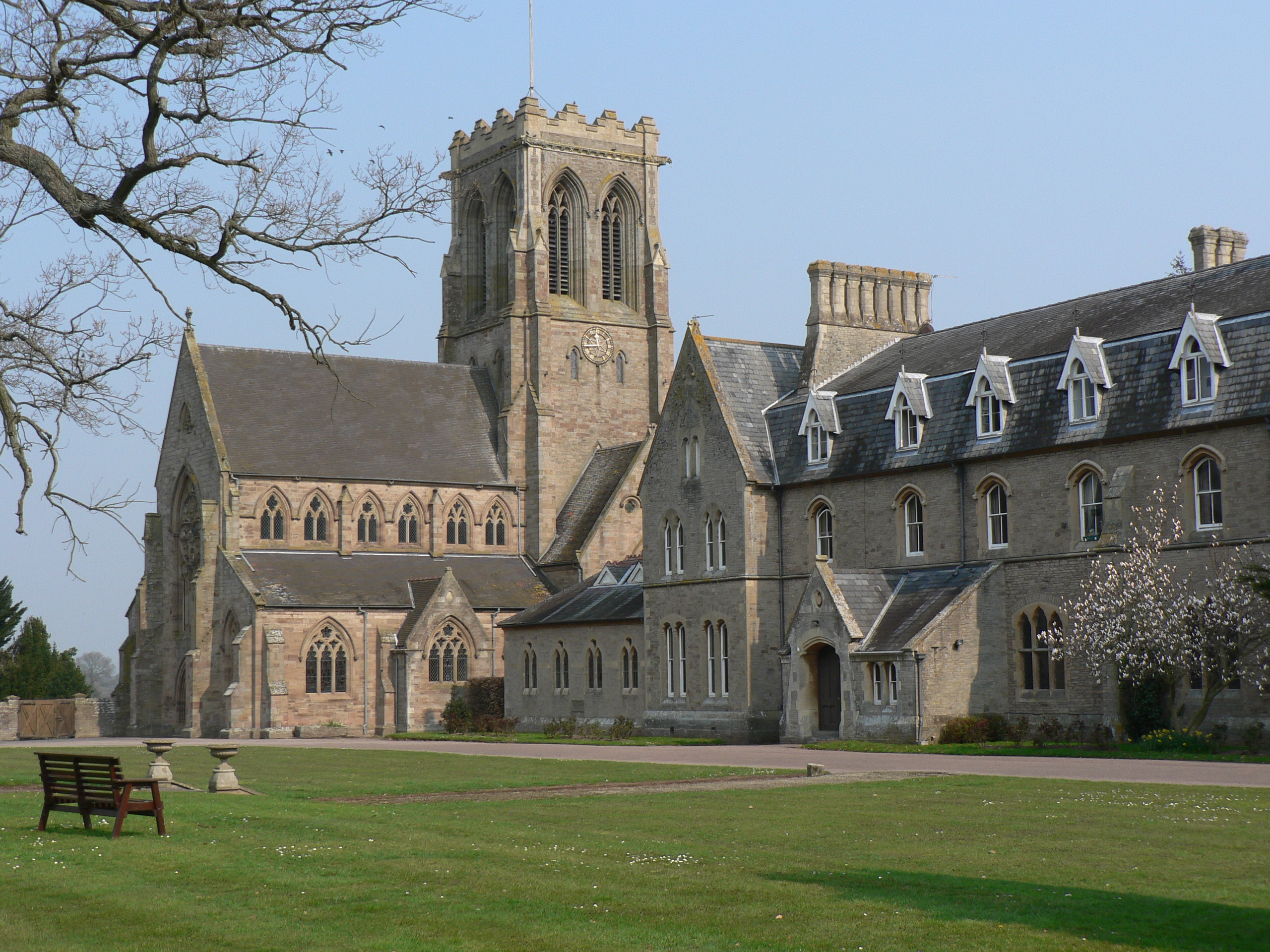
- View from the Abbey gardens

- Location in Herefordshire
- 52.0393°N 2.7564°W
- OS grid reference: SO4821038149
- Location: Hereford, Herefordshire
- Country: England
- Denomination: Roman Catholic
- Website: BelmontAbbey.org.uk

History
- Former name(s): Pro-Cathedral of Newport and Menevia
- Status: Benedictine monastery
- Founded: 1859
- Founder: Francis Wegg-Prosser
- Dedication: St Michael
- Consecrated: 4 September 1860

Architecture
- Functional status: Active
- Heritage designation: Grade II*
- Designated: 22 October 1986
- Architect: Edward Welby Pugin
- Style: Gothic Revival
- Groundbreaking: 1857
- Completed: 1875
- Construction cost: £45,000

Administration
- Province: Cardiff-Menevia
- Archdiocese: Cardiff-Menevia
- Deanery: Herefordshire

Clergy
- Abbot: Rt. Rev. Dom Brendan Thomas OSB

Belmont Abbey, in Herefordshire, England, is a Catholic Benedictine monastery that forms part of the English Benedictine Congregation. It stands on a small hill overlooking the city of Hereford to the east, with views across to the Black Mountains in Wales to the west. The 19th-century Abbey also serves as a parish church.

== History ==
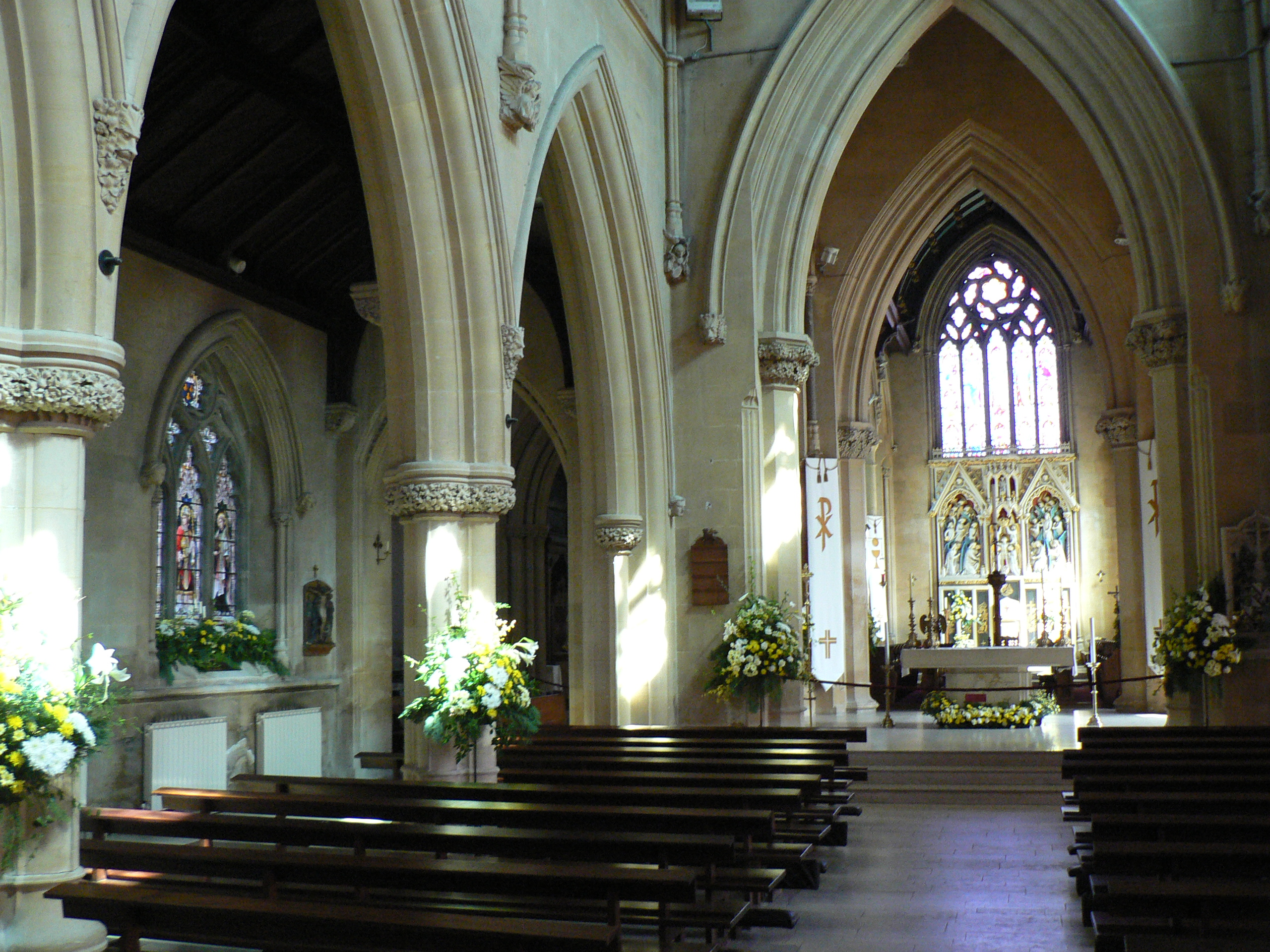
The interior of the Abbey Church

Francis Wegg-Prosser, of nearby Belmont House, who had been received into the Catholic Church, can be called its founder. He decided to build a church on his Hereford estate in 1854. He later invited the Benedictines to reside there so that there would be a permanent Catholic presence in the area. In 1859, the Benedictines arrived and it became a priory. It was the Common Novitiate and House of Studies for the English Benedictine Congregation. It was also a pro-cathedral for the Diocese of Newport and Menevia. The Benedictine Thomas Joseph Brown, who was its first bishop, is buried in the church. Also here, but in the Abbots' graveyard outside the east end of the church, is buried Bishop Bernard Collier, missionary in Mauritius, and Bishop Laurence Youens, 6th Bishop of Northampton.

Belmont was unique in England for having a monastic cathedral chapter. This was the case in mediaeval England where monks were the canons of the cathedral, such as in Canterbury, Winchester and Durham.

A move to transfer the training of monks to the individual monasteries of the English Benedictine Congregation led to Belmont being allowed to take its own novices in 1901, and become an independent house in 1917. In 1920 Belmont was raised to the rank of an Abbey by the papal bull Praeclara Gesta. In 1895, the Diocese of Newport and Menevia split and the abbey remained as the pro-cathedral for the Diocese of Newport. On 7 February 1916, the Diocese of Newport became the Archdiocese of Cardiff and it was decided to make St David's Church in Cardiff the cathedral. On 12 March 1920, St David's church officially became the cathedral for the archdiocese and the abbey ceased to be a pro-cathedral.

The Priory was elevated to the rank of abbey by Pope Benedict XV, who issued the Papal bull Praeclara Gesta on 21 March 1920 and soon after, on 30 June 1920 the Community of St Michael's elected Prior Aelred Kindersley, originally a monk of Downside, as their first Abbot.

In March 2025, it was announced that the Community of St Gregory the Great, formerly Downside Abbey of the same Benedictine congregation, would move to Belmont Abbey for an experimental period of two years. Formally, they remain a separate community. In July 2025 a second announcement was made of the completion of the community move.

== The Abbey Church ==
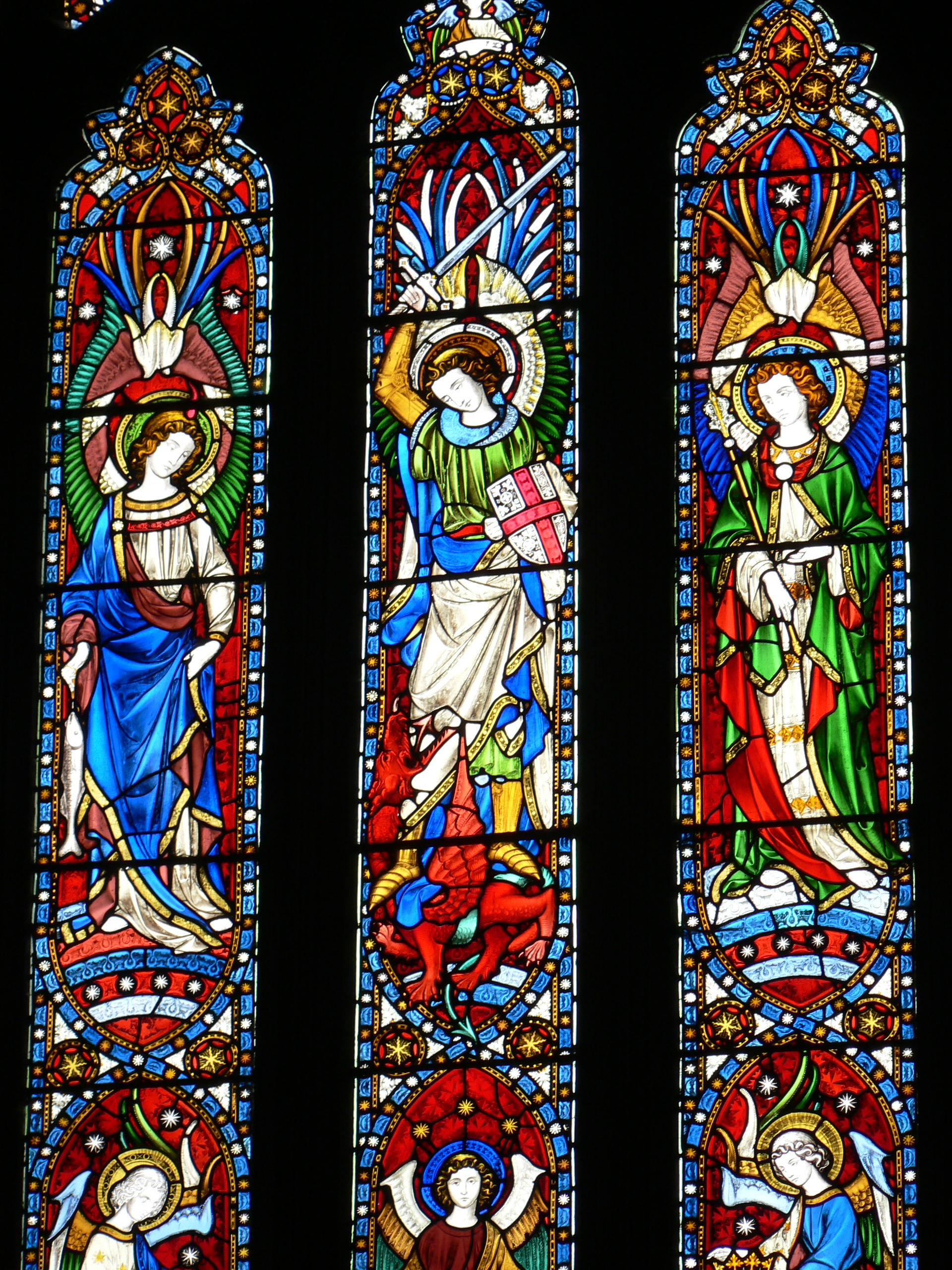
Stained Glass of Ss Raphael, Michael, Gabriel and angels

The Abbey Church is a Grade II* listed building. Its construction began in 1857 and it was consecrated on 4 September 1860. It was built to the designs of Edward Welby Pugin, son of Augustus Welby Pugin. Built in the decorated, early English style, it demonstrated the resurgent optimism of the restored Catholic faith.

The exterior is in local pink sandstone, simple and unadorned, reminiscent of many classical monastic facades of the 14th century. The interior is faced with warm Bath stone. The church is dominated by four elegant, steeply pointed, arches which support the central tower. Originally this was the crossing, but now the altar stands here at the centre of the Church. The whole church was expensive for its time costing £45,000.

The church is noted for the quality of its sculpture and stained glass. There are windows depicting angels with harps, cymbals and pipes.There are also a number of windows which depict English Martyrs. There is an angel reredos in the east end of the church and a Victorian glass window showing the archangels Michael (the abbey's patron, sword and shield in hand, trampling the dragon), Raphael and Gabriel and the nine choirs of angels as an angelic orchestra sounding of praises of God.

Under a wooden roof stands the monastic choir, where the community gathers five times a day for the Divine Office and Mass. Side altars are dedicated to the Blessed Virgin Mary, St Joseph, and a memorial altar commemorating the former pupils of the school who were killed in the Second World War. The North Transept was formerly a chantry chapel dedicated to the Welsh Saints.

St Benedict's chapel, completed in 1875, shows the monastic founder in the central reredos.

The churchyard contains three Commonwealth war graves, of a Royal Navy chaplain and a surgeon of World War I, and a Royal Air Force officer of World War II.

== Monastic life ==
The monastic community follows the Rule of St Benedict under the guidance of an Abbot, centred on the Divine Office and Mass prayed daily in the Abbey Church.

The community currently numbers 35 monks in England and Peru. The current Abbot is Dom Brendan Thomas and the Prior is Dom Alexander Kenyon. The Prior of the dependant house in Peru is Dom Alex Echeandia.

Following the post-Reformation English tradition, the monks have been involved in educational and pastoral work. In 1926, Belmont Abbey School was founded. This continued to expand in the post war years. Two preparatory schools were also founded, Alderwasley and Llanarth, Monmouthshire. These in turn were closed, and the school at Belmont was itself closed in 1994. Associations for former pupils still exist.

Today the monks undertake numerous works including the pastoral care of the Catholics in Herefordshire, Worcestershire and South Wales. In addition the community maintains a small foundation at Lurín near Lima, Peru, the Monastery of the Holy Trinity.

The monks also run the retreat, guesthouse and conference centre, Hedley Lodge. A programme of educational visits is offered to schools throughout the West Midlands and Wales.

A police investigation resulted in Father John Kinsey being sentenced to five years at Worcester Crown Court in 2005 by Judge Andrew Geddes for a series of serious offences relating to assaults on schoolboys attending Belmont Abbey School in the mid-1980s.

In 2006 the Heritage Lottery Fund awarded Belmont Abbey a grant for their project 'Discovering Belmont Abbey', to make the Abbey Church more accessible to a wide range of people, to enlarge its educational activities and restore the fabric of the church. Work commenced in August 2008.

== Monastery of the Most Holy Trinity, Peru ==
In 1981, at the invitation of the Archbishop of Piura, three monks from Belmont Abbey established a monastic foundation in Tambogrande, northern Peru. In August 2006, the community relocated to Pachacamac in the Diocese of Lurín, situated just 30 miles (less than an hour’s drive) south of Lima. By 2018, the community moved to its current home: a monastery in Lurín that previously housed a community of Cistercian nuns, originally founded by the famous Abbey of Las Huelgas in Spain.

The move to Lurín came at a vital moment of growth for the expanding community. This new location offers ample space for their daily life, hospitality, and apostolic work. The property features a complete set of traditional monastic buildings—including a church, a guesthouse, a chapter room, and workshops—complemented by a 10-acre orchard.

Community Life and Work The community supports itself through endeavors such as writing icons, hand-painting Paschal candles, hosting retreats, baking seasonal panettones, and selling fresh fruits and vegetables grown directly in the monastery’s orchard. In recent years, the monastery has also become a local centre for spirituality and liturgical resources.

A Centre of the Community As a dependent daughter house of Belmont, the monastery is now much more centrally located, sitting just a 10-minute walk from the local cathedral, seminary, market, and transit links. The community still adheres to its principles of living monastically and continuing the outreach work with the poor.

== List of Abbots (until 1920 – Priors) ==
- 1859–1862: Dom Norbert Sweeney, monk of Downside Abbey
- 1862–1873: Dom Bede Vaughan, monk of Downside Abbey, second Archbishop of Sydney
- 1873–1901: Dom Wilfrid Raynal, monk of Downside Abbey
- 1901–1905: Dom Ildephonsus Cummins, monk of Ampleforth Abbey
- 1905–1914: Dom Clement Fowler, monk of Downside Abbey
- 1915–1934: Dom Aelred Kindersley, monk of Downside Abbey, first Abbot
- 1934–1940: Dom Romuald Leonard
- 1940–1948: Dom Aidan Williams
- 1948–1953: Dom Anselm Lightbound
- 1953–1955: Dom Alphege Gleeson
- 1955–1966: Dom Maurice Martin
- 1966–1970: Dom Robert Richardson
- 1970–1986: Dom Jerome Hodkinson
- 1986–1993: Dom Alan Rees
- 1993–2000: Dom Mark Jabalé
- 2000–2024: Dom Paul Stonham
- 2024–present: Dom Brendan Thomas

== In media ==
The Abbey and the daily activities of a number of monks were the subject of 3rd episode of the television series Retreat: Meditations from a Monastery, first shown on BBC Four in October 2017.

== Burials ==
- Dom Joseph Brown (bishop)
- Dom Bernard Collier (bishop)
- Dom Mark Jabalé (bishop)
- Laurence Youens (bishop)

In 1982, excavations carried out in Hereford City Centre on the site of the medieval St Guthlac's Priory (1143–1537) discovered the remains of the monks buried there. It was decided that they would be exhumed and reinterred within the grounds of Belmont Abbey in the monks’ cemetery. A small gravestone marks the spot. The text reads in Latin: “Hic Iacent ossa monachorum Monasterii St Guthlac prope Herefordiam. Sepulta 22-5-1982.” English translation; “Here lie the bones of the monks of the monastery of St. Guthlac, near Hereford. Buried 22-5-1982.”

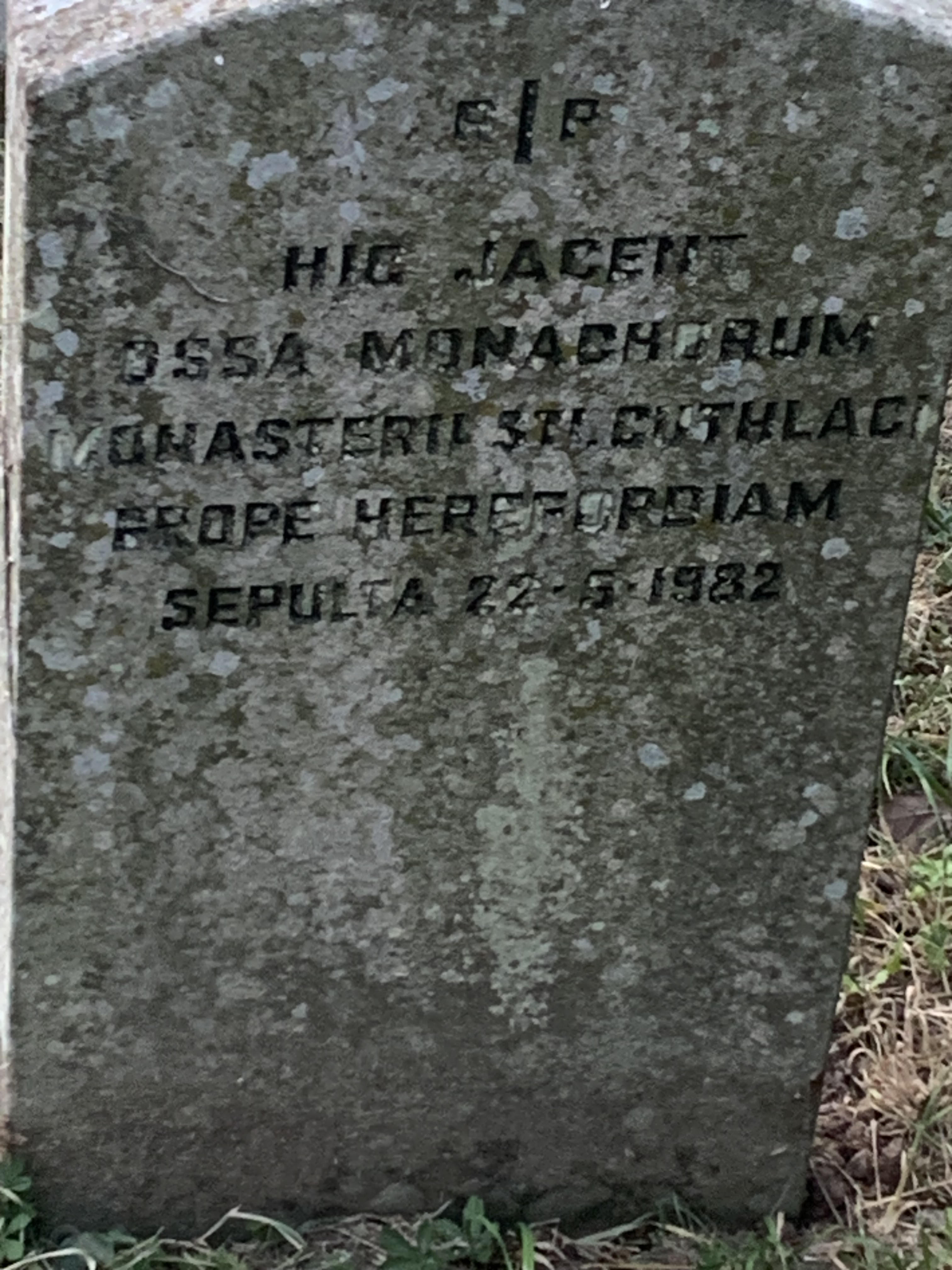
Grave Stone of St Guthlac's Monks

It was fitting, then, that these Benedictines were once again afforded a place of rest, surrounded by those who had reestablished the Benedictine presence in Hereford over three hundred years later. St Guthlac is commemorated in the window above the west door in the abbey church. In the window, he can be seen holding a model of Belmont Abbey Church in his hand.

== Parish of St Michael and All Angels ==
The abbey is also the parish church for the Parish of St Michael and All Angels, part of the Herefordshire Catholic Deanery within the Metropolitan Archdiocese of Cardiff. Until 1859 parishioners used the chapel of St Peter & St Paul for Mass. That building is now used as the parish centre.

== Gallery ==
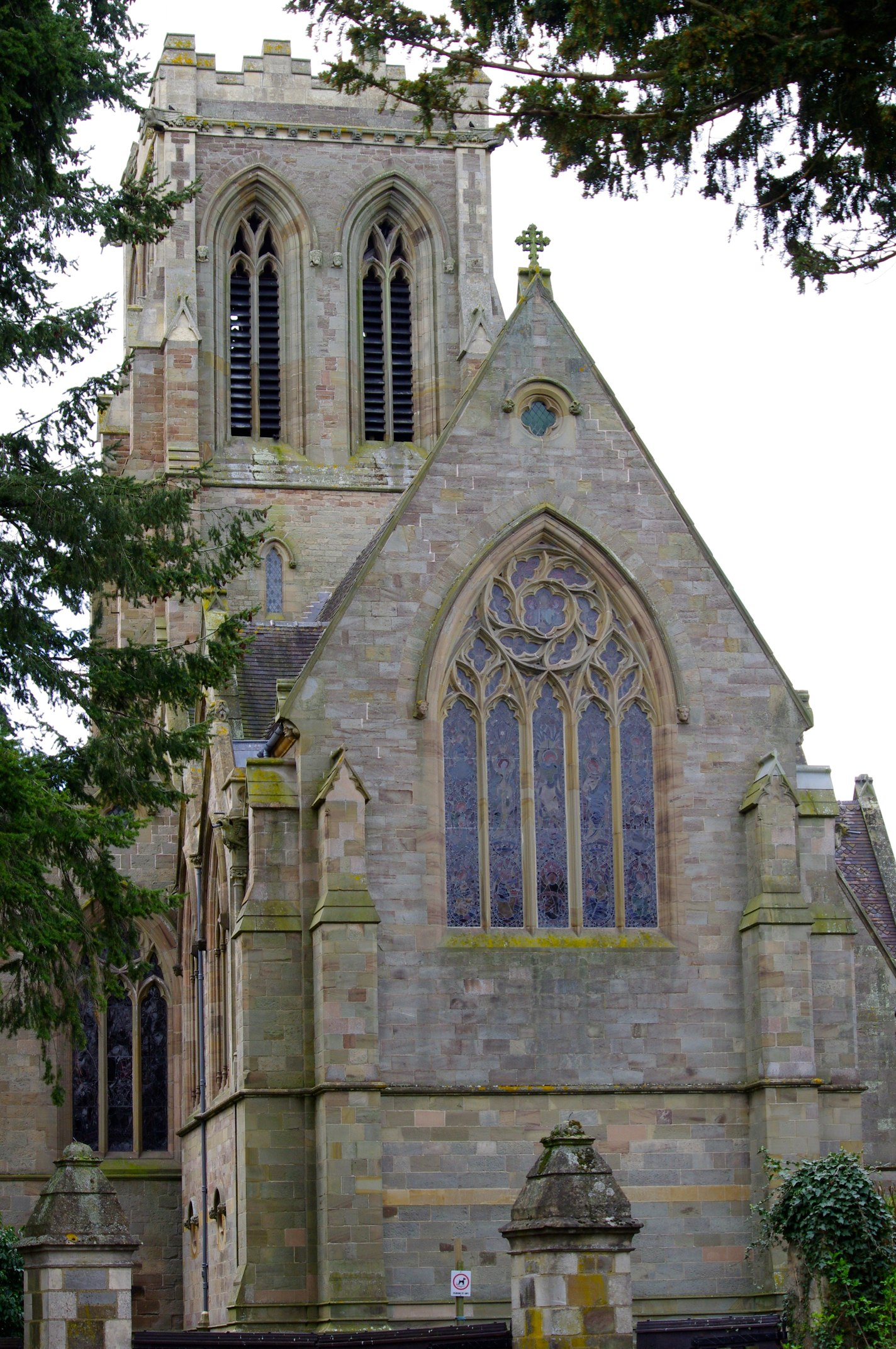
East side of the Abbey Church

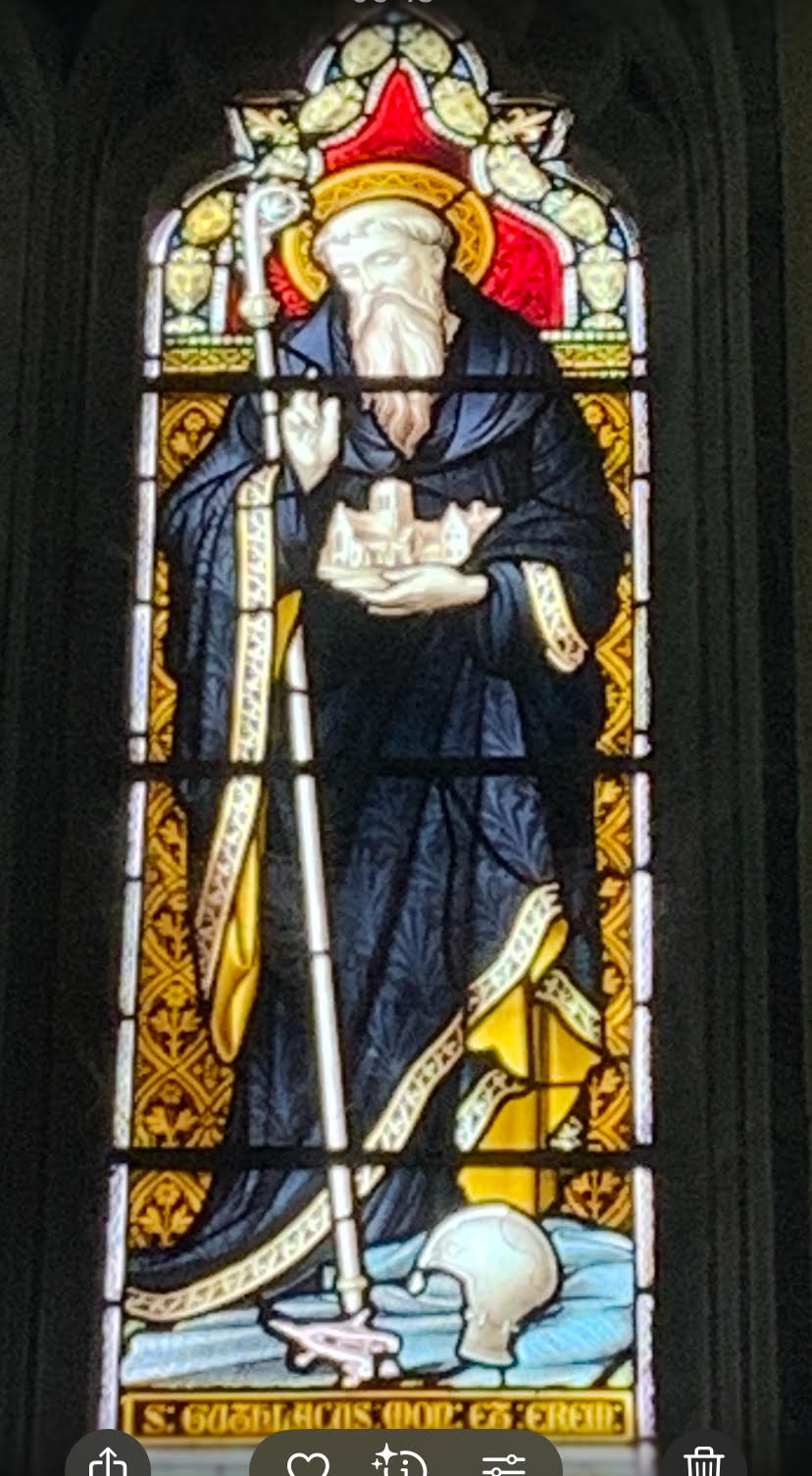
Stained Glass window depicting St Guthlac who is holding Belmont Abbey in his hand.

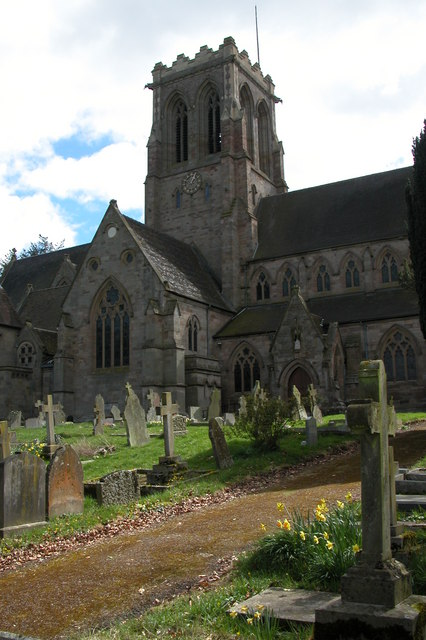
View across the neighbouring cemetery

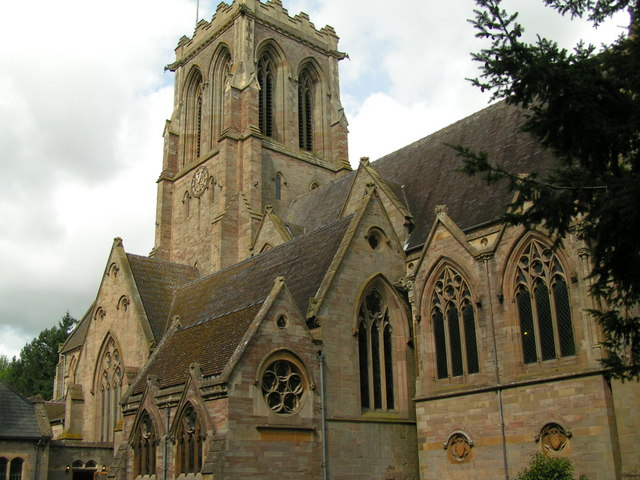
North side of the Abbey Church

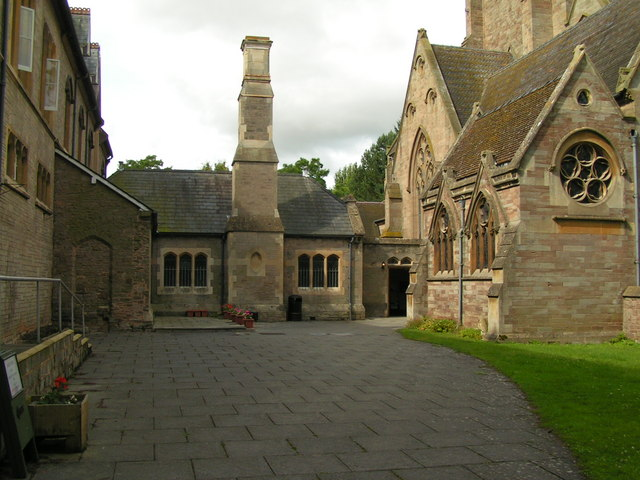
Abbey Church entrance

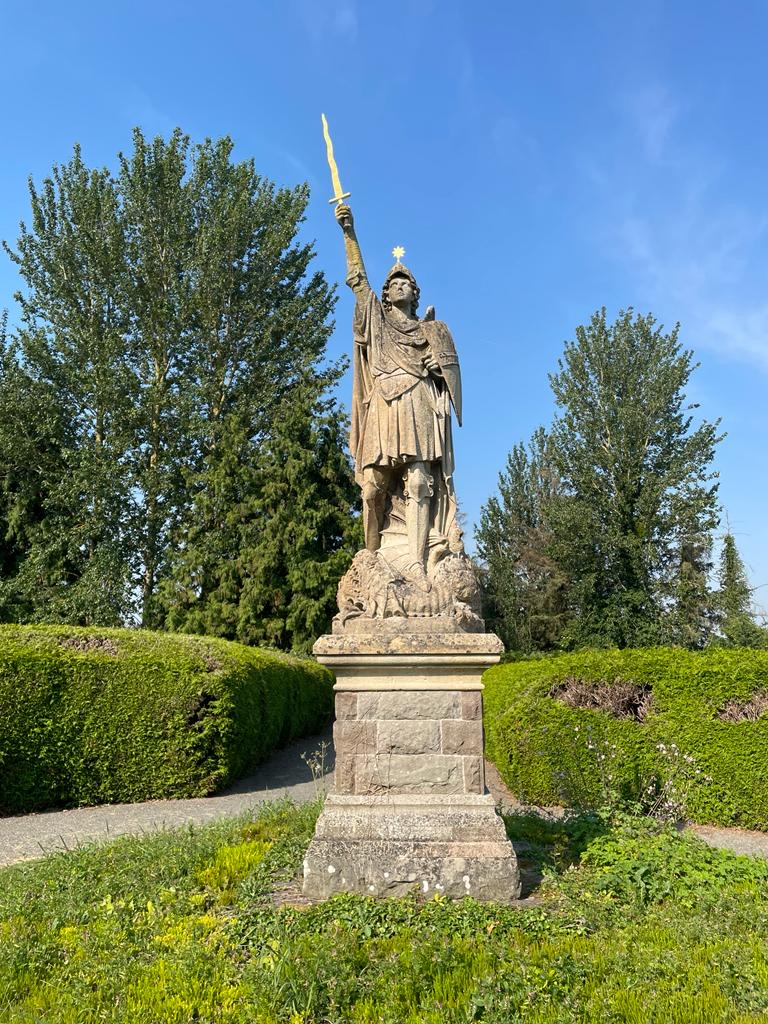
Statue of the abbey's patron St Michael located in the monastic gardens

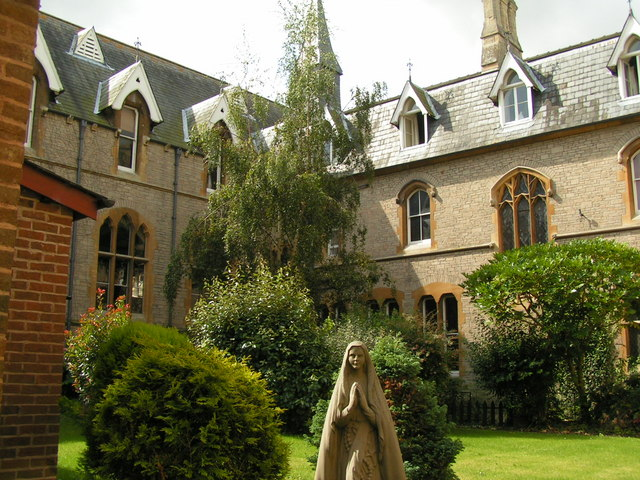
Abbey building

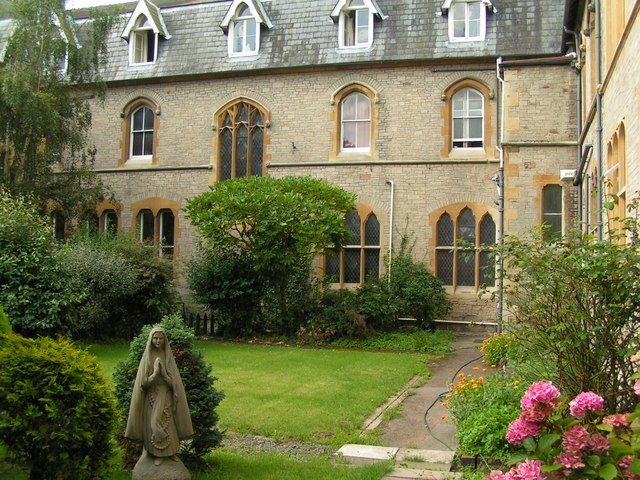
Small garden

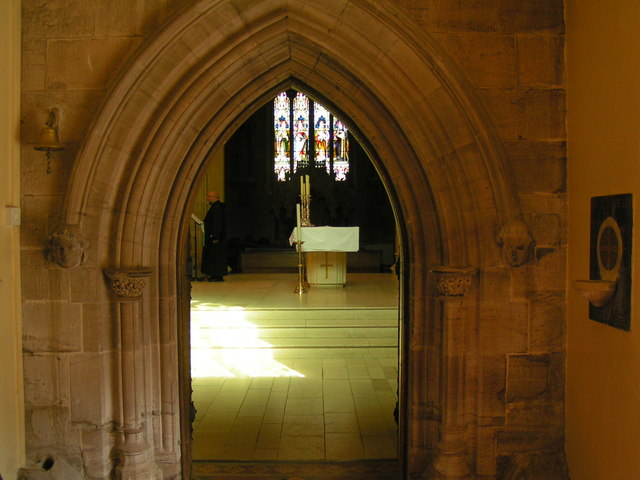
View of altar from entrance

== Bibliography ==
- The History of Belmont Abbey by Basil Whelan, Bloomsbury Publishing Company 1959.
