= Church Army USA =

Anglican organization

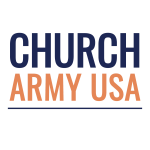
- Founded: 1928
- Founder: Wilson Carlile
- Type: Non-profit, Christian
- Headquarters: Aliquippa, Pennsylvania
- Location: United States
- Fields: Evangelism, outreach, social action, poverty relief
- National director: The Rev. Capt. Herb Bailey
- Website: churcharmyusa.org

Church Army USA is an evangelistic organization and mission community associated with Anglican churches. Its roots are in Church Army, founded in 1882 in association with the Church of England, and it is one of many Church Army branches operating internationally in the Anglican Communion. While it was historically associated with the Episcopal Church, Church Army USA is a formal ministry partner of the Anglican Church in North America.

In the United States, the organization has EIN 25-1624453 as a 501(c)(3) Public Charity; in 2024, it reported $604,492 in total revenue and $190,900 in total assets.

== History ==
=== Origins in England ===
The Church Army was founded in England in 1882 by the Rev. Wilson Carlile, who brought together soldiers, officers and a few working men and women whom he and others trained to act as Church of England evangelists among the poor and outcasts of the Westminster slums. Carlile wanted to share the Gospel with people who would not dream of setting foot inside a church and training people of the same class—ordinary lay people—as evangelists. At the same time, similar groups were appearing; the Rev. Evan Hopkins was organizing a "Church Gospel Army" and other clergy had established a "Church Salvation Army" at Oxford and a "Church Mission Army" at Bristol. Carlile suggested a combined "Church Army."

As the work grew, a training institution for evangelists was started in Oxford with F. S. Webster as principal, but soon moved (1886) to London, where, in Bryanston Street near Marble Arch, the headquarters of the army was established. Working men were trained as evangelists, and working women as mission sisters, and were supplied to the clergy. The male evangelists had to pass an examination by the Archdeacon of Middlesex, and were then (from 1896) admitted by the bishop of London as "lay evangelists in the Church." The mission sisters likewise passed an examination by the diocesan inspector of schools. Church Army workers were entirely under the control of the incumbent of the parish to which they were sent, and were paid a small sum for their services either by the vicar or by voluntary local contributions. Church Army vehicles circulated throughout the country parishes, if desired, with itinerant evangelists, who held simple missions, without charge, and distributed literature.

=== Growth in the United States ===
The first Church Army evangelists began operating in the United States in around 1925. Church Army USA was formally organized in 1928.

In its early decades in the U.S., Church Army USA focused on service and evangelism in "mental hospitals, homes for the elderly, in areas of migrant workers, inner city ministries, [and] American Indians in the Dakotas and Alaska." Church Army USA members were commissioned directly by the presiding bishop of the Episcopal Church. For women, commissioning as a sister or officer in Church Army USA was a way to exercise formal ministry in the Episcopal Church prior to the ordination of women.

In 1969, the organization "faced an acute financial and organizational crisis." In response, Church Army USA reconceived itself as a more ecumenical organization focused on training and service placements along the lines of the federal VISTA program. In 1975, Church Army USA formally reestablished itself as the National Institute for Lay Training, with a mission to "prepare lay Christians for special ministries that can effectively be performed in such areas as evangelism, adult education and mission, youth work, administration, and social service." The approximately 60 commissioned Church Army USA officers came together in a newly established organization called Church Army Society.

In the late 1970s, the National Institute evolved in a different direction than originally designed but as the legal successor to Church Army USA retained access to nearly $70,000 in bequests and dedicated gifts for Church Army purposes. By 1980, the Church Army Society terminated its relationship with the National Institute for Lay Training, and sought "to re-establish itself as the independent order of primarily lay evangelists and missionaries that it once was," according to news reports at the time. "Because of legal entanglements, this may be a difficult task, members say, since many bequests which have been intended for Church Army use have gone, and will continue to go, to the National Institute unless they are specifically designated for the Church Army Society."

Revived as Church Army USA, the organization moved its headquarters to the Pittsburgh area in 1992. That same year, it launched an addiction recovery ministry in Branson, Missouri, which grew to several locations in southwestern Missouri over three decades before becoming an independent ministry in 2013. After the Anglican realignment, Church Army USA became a ministry partner of the Anglican Church in North America, but it has discerned partnerships with some Episcopal Church dioceses.

== Activities ==
Church Army USA is headquartered at Uncommon Grounds Cafe, a coffeeshop in the depressed former steel town of Aliquippa, near Pittsburgh. The cafe was founded in 2001 by a Church Army USA officer and all volunteer staff are trained in evangelism, social service referrals and dealing with difficult situations customers may face. In addition to Aliquippa, Church Army USA has evangelists in residence in Beaver Falls, Pennsylvania; Branson; Farmington, Missouri; Hillsville, Virginia; Plainville, Connecticut; Ocala, Florida; and Belington, West Virginia. Church Army USA ministries also include "street churches" for the homeless in places like Hartford, Connecticut.

== Training ==
Trinity School for Ministry and Church Army USA offer a non-degree certificate in evangelism. It consists of four courses and a Church Army USA-designed practicum and is offered to all, not just to Church Army USA evangelists in training.

== See also ==
- Church Army
