= Church Army Chapel, Blackheath =

Building in southeast London, England

Coordinates: 51°28′39″N 0°00′55″E

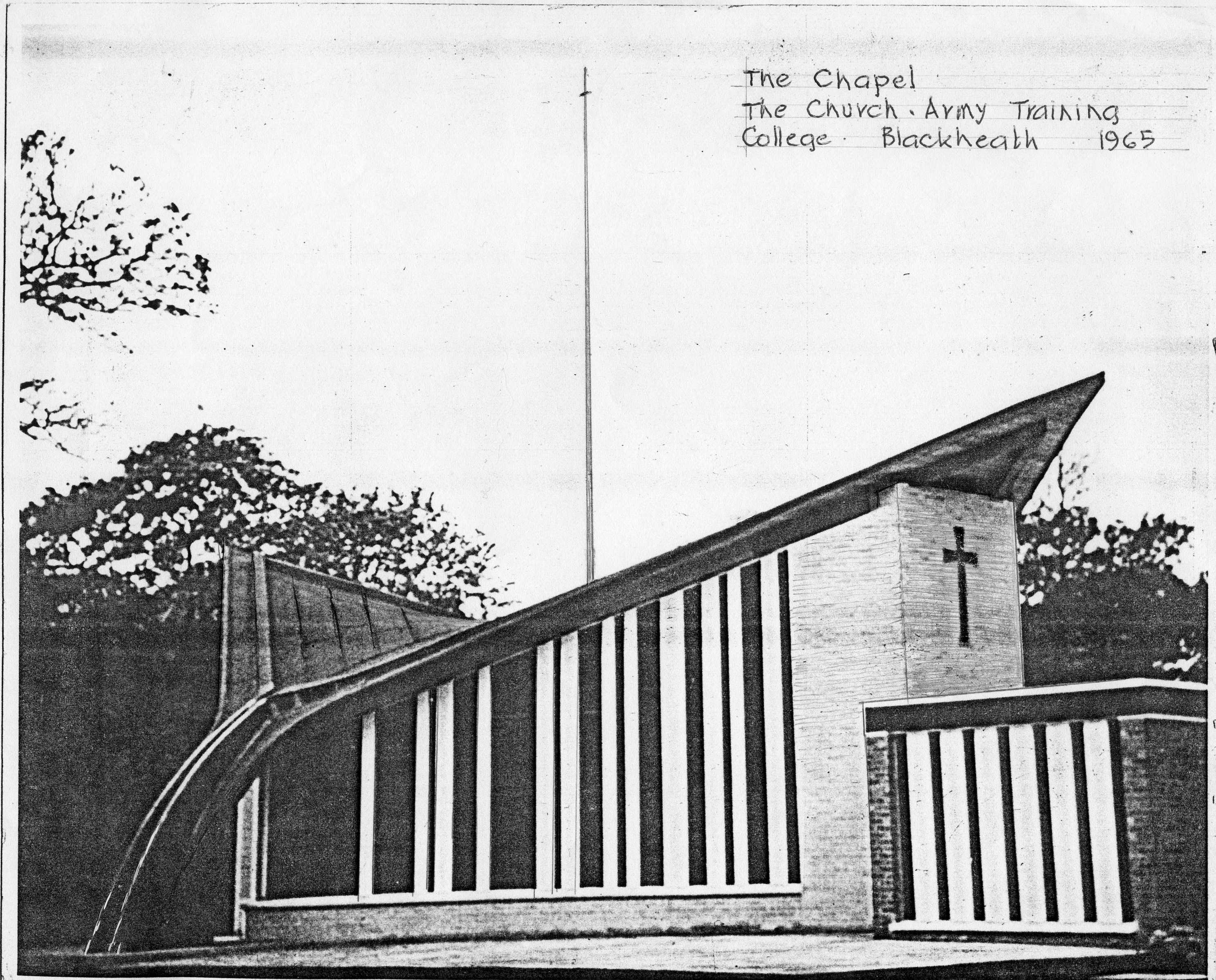
- Drawing by E.T. Spashett

General information
- Architectural style: Modern
- Location: Greenwich, Greater London, United Kingdom
- Construction started: March 1964.
- Completed: 1965
- Cost: £250,000 (whole site)
- Client: Church Army

Technical details
- Structural system: Saddle roof and sectional aluminium spire

Design and construction
- Architects: Ernest Trevor Spashett ARIBA (1923–94)
- Structural engineer: Woodgate (Blackheath) Ltd, Montpelier-vale, Blackheath

The Church Army Chapel at Vanbrugh Park, Blackheath, Greater London, designed by project architect E.T. Spashett for Austin Vernon & Partners, opened in 1965 by Princess Alexandra and consecrated by Michael Ramsey, is a locally listed building of outstanding architectural significance, and is notable for originally having had the tallest sectional aluminium spire of its time, and for being one of the earliest 20th-century chapels of modern design to have been conceived with a central altar. It is now part of Blackheath High School.

== Local listing description ==
At Greenwich Council building conservation department it is locally listed as a building of outstanding architectural significance, under the name of the Wilson Carlile Training College Chapel at 27 Vanbrugh Park, Blackheath, London, by architect E.T. Spashett. It is described as: "An interesting modern building of unusual design featuring a striking gull wing upper roof swept to ground level on one side; grey brick with tall, narrow window lights". Local listings have no reference number. By the time Greenwich Council planning department assessed it in the 1980s, the spire was down and lying alongside the building. The building could not be upgraded to national status by The Department for Culture, Media and Sport, representing English Heritage in April 1999, as the spire was gone so the massiveness of the roof structure could no longer be understood by the assessors who were puzzled to find it "overscaled". When opened complete with spire in 1965, the South East London Mercury described the chapel as "a showpiece of modern architecture and building technique".

== Design ==
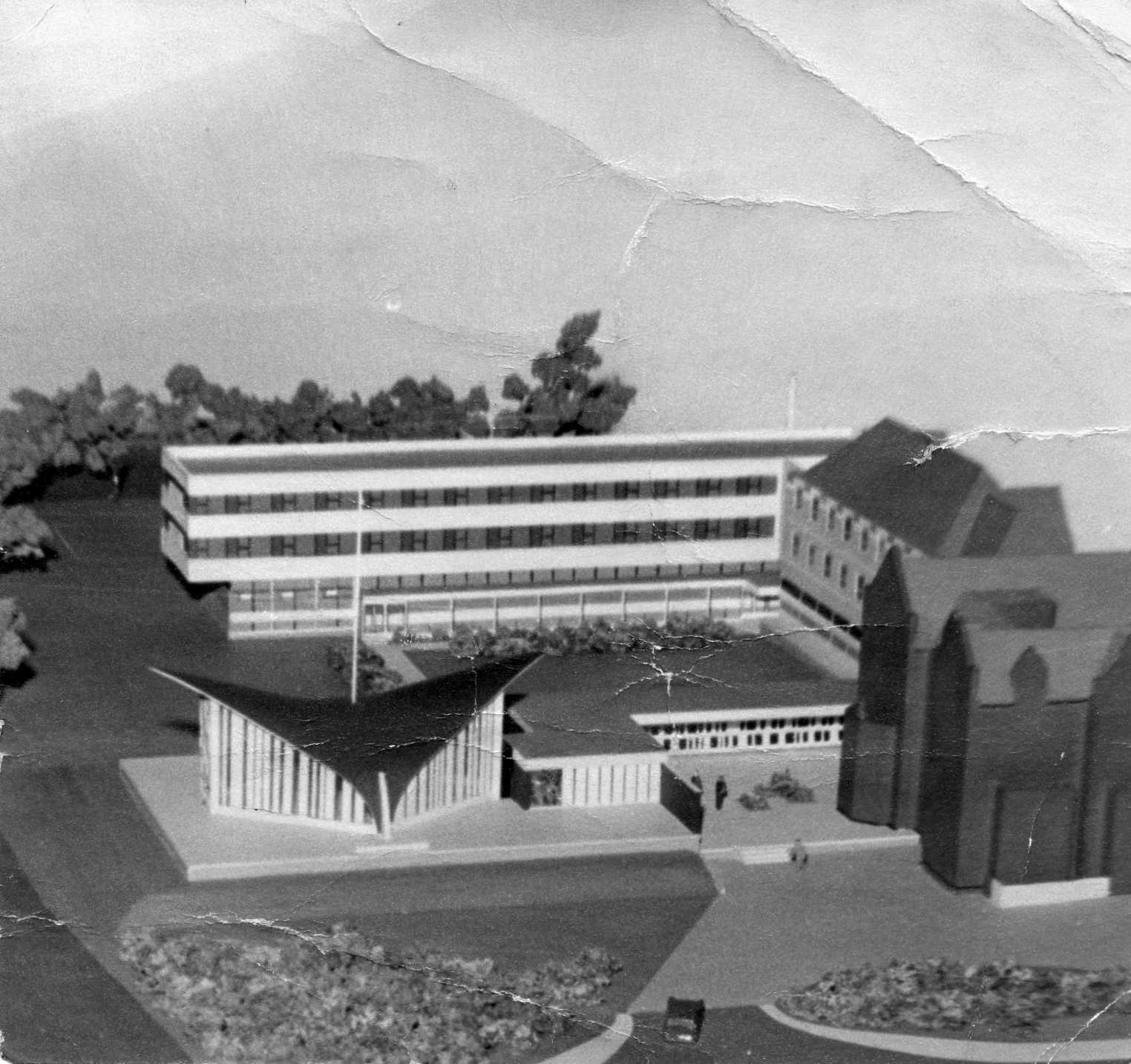
1964 model of site showing spire fixed to centre of roof

The Church Army does not normally have a chapel as it does outreach work, but in the 1960s an exception was made for its headquarters at Blackheath, possibly as the chapel could be considered part of the training college.

=== Spire ===
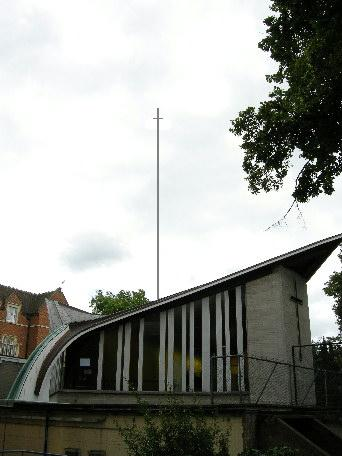
North-west elevation, 2009, with missing spire drawn onto image, and foundation-box visible

The concept for the building is embodied in the spire, which was a very tall, slim, hollow aluminium cone at least twice the height of the building again, chosen for its lightness and strength as proved in the aeroplane construction industry – the architect being ex-Royal Air Force. It was made up of a series of overlapping hollow sections decreasing in size up to the final cone-section at the top, like a Victorian hand-held brass telescope, but with the overlaps of the expanding sections reversed. (Note: Such a telescope was the first inspiration for the construction of the spire: information from architect, 1964.) A small cross-piece through the top cone section doubled as the hilt of a sword, representing the Church Army in the context of such Biblical expressions as "good soldier of Christ". The spire had a flanged base, mounted on a round plate, then a rectangular plate. The cross-shaped top was also reminiscent of the capping-crosses of medieval spires like the one on Salisbury Cathedral (see image, below). A slightly similar type of aluminium spire had been added to the top of the Chrysler Building in 1929, allegedly as a surprise in that it created, temporarily, New York City's tallest building. St. Michael's Parish Church, Linlithgow has a controversial "Crown of Thorns" aluminium spire of sectional construction, erected in 1964.

=== Building ===
This construction of the whole site cost £250,000 (equivalent to £4,232,524.60 in 2025). It was a renovation of the former St Christopher's College and the addition of a new block and chapel. During the construction of the building, the site of a previous building was discovered. It was excavated by members of the Lewisham Natural History Society, who identified the former building as the 18th-century Wricklemarsh Manor. The original plans for this manor still exist. The dig also exposed signs of an even older building on the same site.

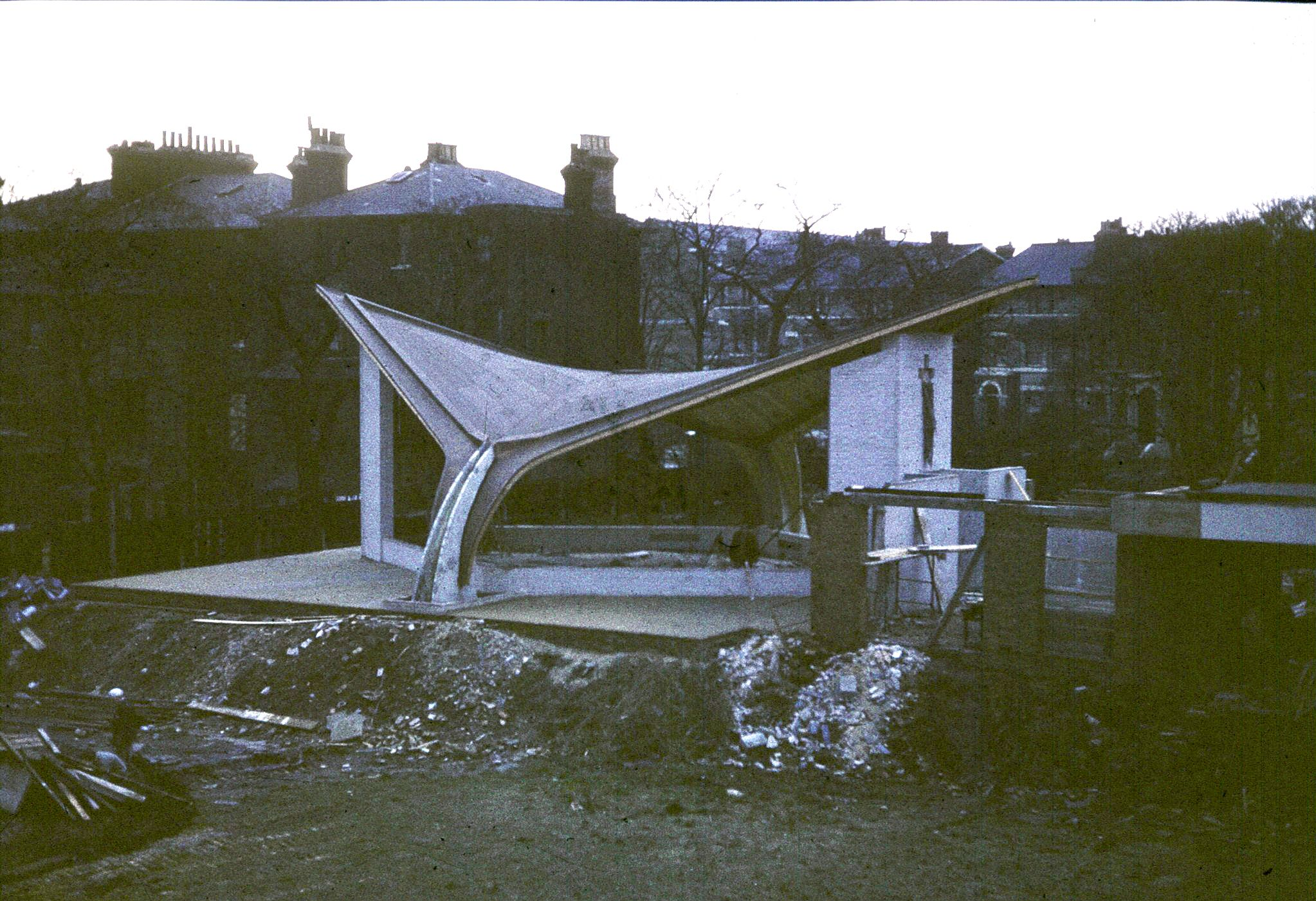
Chapel being built in 1964: south-east elevation, possibly with spire sections piled on the left

In the official programme for the 1965 opening the building is described as follows:

"The chapel is of special interest: it has been planned to suit modern conceptions of worship, with the faithful gathered round the communion table and the celebrant normally facing the people. Its shell roof is in the shape of a hyperbolic paraboloid, and is constructed of three thin skins of timber laid in different directions, glued and spiked, being supported entirely by its two buttresses. The slit windows which run from floor to roof are separated by concrete pillars faced outside with a white mosaic tile finish and inside with white leather-cloth. The furnishings and doors are of American black walnut and the floor is a grey-green terrazzo." (Note: The explanation of "modern conceptions of worship" may imply a central altar as in Liverpool Metropolitan Cathedral. However the Church Army unexpectedly installed pews and a west-end altar, as seen in a photo in Church Army Review, Editor Vera Burtt, June 1965, page 8. The interior white leather-cloth is now missing. The terrazzo floor is covered with a sprung wooden floor, which may also possibly serve to protect the original floor, however the terrazzo is still visible in the chapel lobby.)

The Kentish Independent described the building thus:

The chapel is of startlingly modern design. Its shell roof is the shape of a hyperbolic paraboloid and is constructed of three thick skins of timber laid in three different directions, glued and spiked, and supported by two buttresses. Slit windows run from floor to roof.

The columns between the windows do not appear to meet the roof when viewed from below: this gives a floating-roof effect. Although the tops of the white brick walls on the east and west elevations are fixed to the roof to stabilise it, the floating-roof effect is continued with a top row of dark blue engineering bricks with dark pointing. Viewed from below, this row can look like a gap between wall and roof. This row is clearly shown in a photograph in the Blackheath Reporter.

==== Roof ====
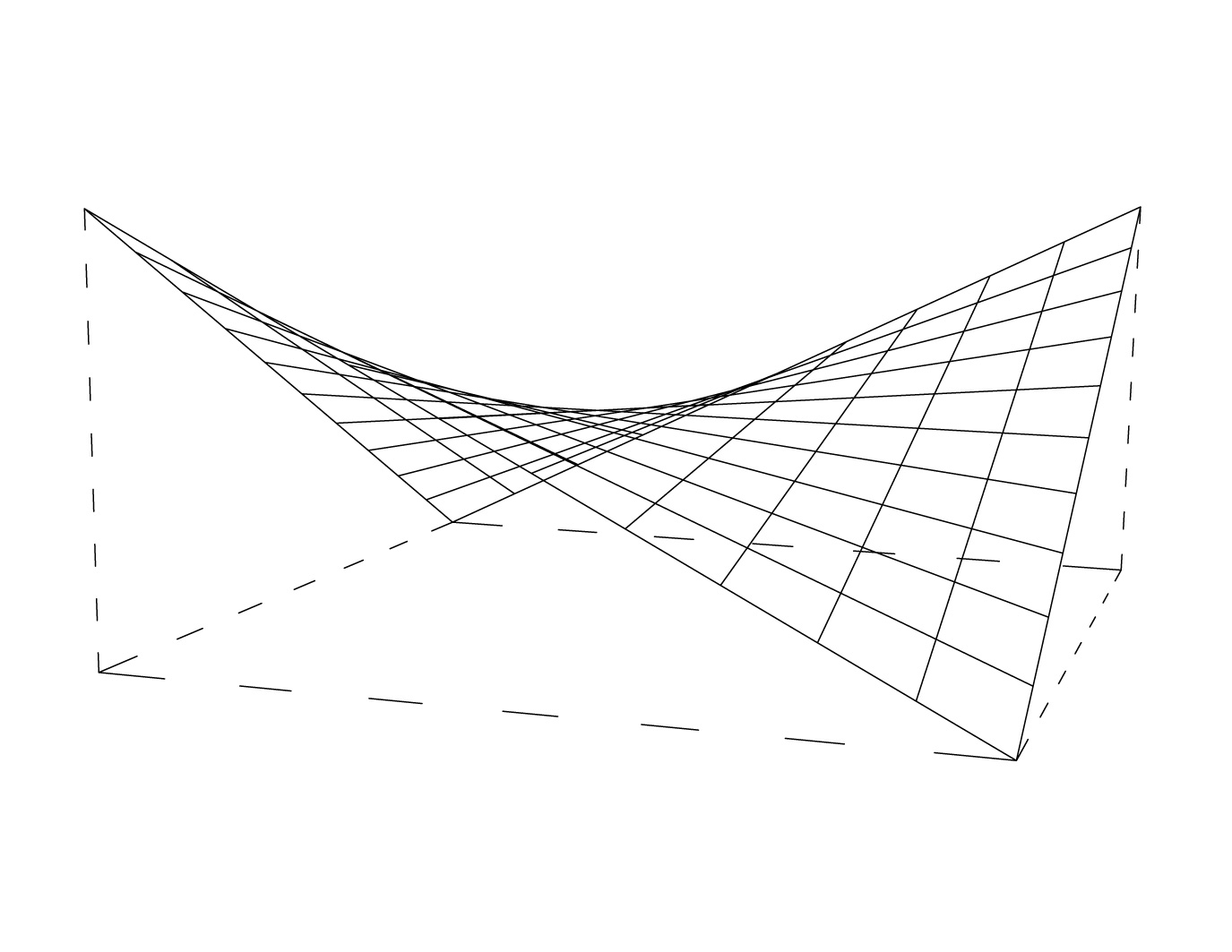
The chapel has a saddle roof: mathematically, this is a hyperbolic paraboloid, which, as a doubly ruled surface, can be constructed from two rows of straight beams.

One inspiration for the building was Le Corbusier and his Modular Man proportions and saddle roofs. By 1963 when the building was at the design stage it was known that the prefabricated shell-roof version, constructed of thin, cast, reinforced concrete, was subject to being lifted bodily from buildings by high winds and that some shapes such as this one could create a drainage problem. Drainage could compromise the smooth appearance with guttering and pipes, or it could encourage chronic leakage over time if holes had to be made in the structure. The metal-covered timber roof suffered damage from thieves in 2008, and it was re-covered using a new system.

The roof is a saddle roof, meaning that it is in the shape of a hyperbolic paraboloid, and thus the curved shape can be constructed with straight beams; a previous example was a 1956 Kansas house.

==== Interior ====
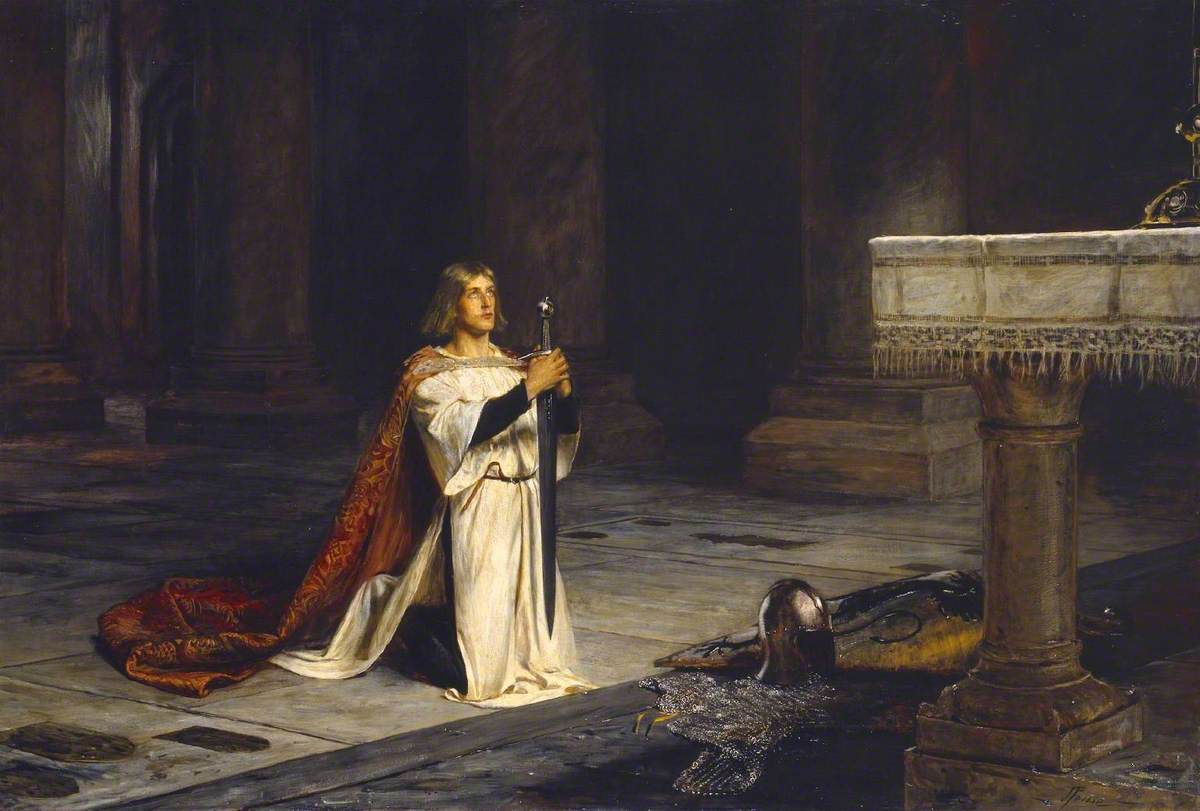
The Vigil, 1884, by John Pettie

The cross-shaped blue glass window on the east side (Note: In 2009 the blue cross-shaped window was blocked on the outside so appears black from the inside. See photographs on article page.) was intended to double as a symbolic sword-shape, like the original spire. This is because the first inspiration for the building was The Vigil by John Pettie, 1884. In the painting, a squire holds his vigil by praying overnight before his knighting ceremony, hoping that he and his equipment might be purified beforehand. As the design of the spire was inspired by the vertical position of the squire's sword, which symbolises the cross, so the natural lighting inside the chapel is inspired by this painting, which featured in a book awarded to Spashett as an art prize at Humphry Davy School. In The Vigil, the dawn light falls from the east window above the altar onto the squire and his sword, and the purification is symbolised by the glow of the white surplice. A shadow below the squire's arm crosses a crease in the surplice, giving the effect of a shadowy cross on his torso. In the Blackheath chapel, a blue celestial light is designed to fall in the shape of a cross or sword across the central altar of the basilica-shaped (Note: i.e. the early meeting-room form) interior from the east side. The tall, rectangular windows of the building were inspired by the gallery of shadowy pillars in the background of the painting. There is a theory that medieval pillars and fan vaulting had some connection with the appearance of an avenue of trees.

== History ==
=== Opening ===
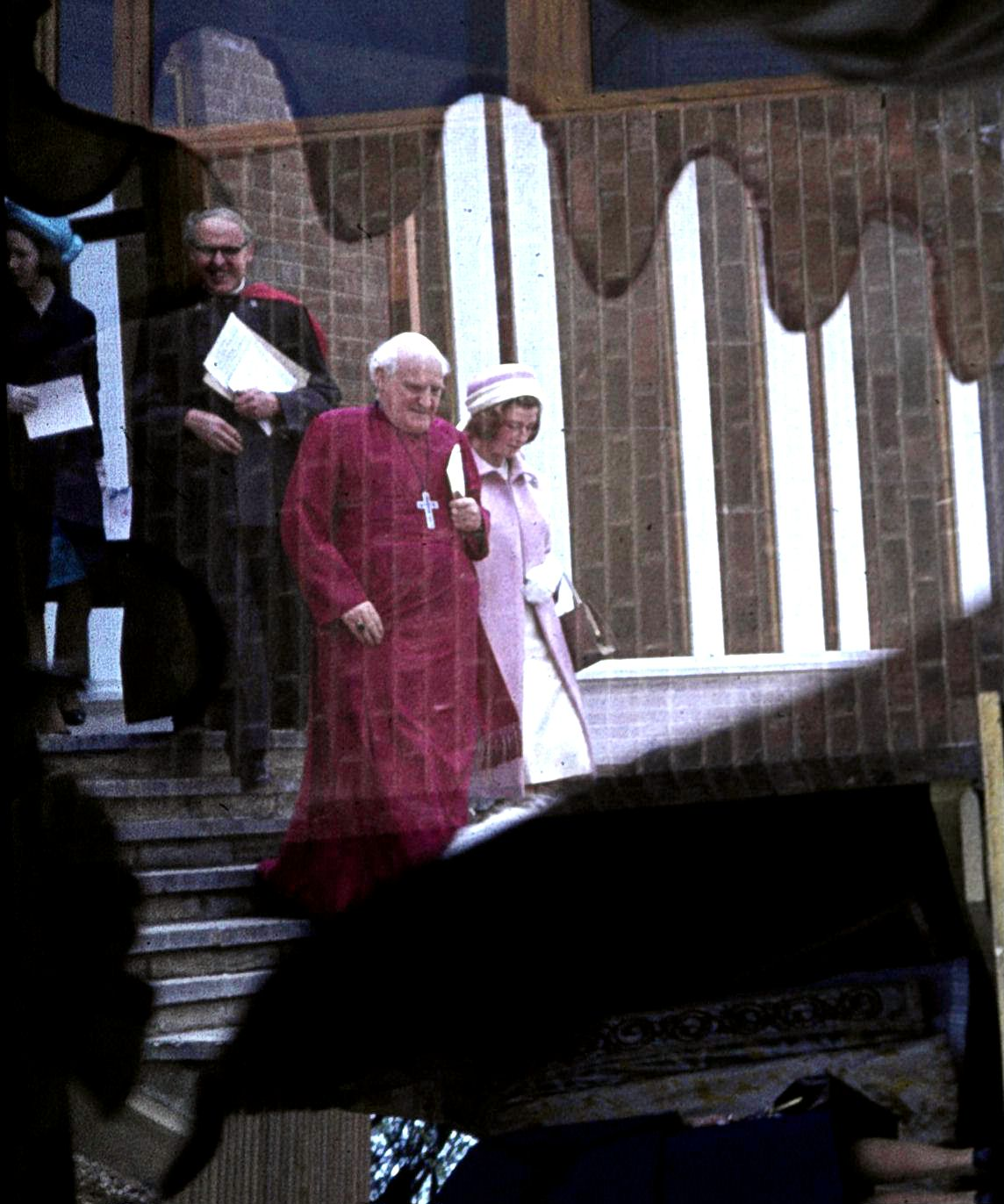
Michael Ramsey and Princess Alexandra on the chapel steps on 6 May 1965

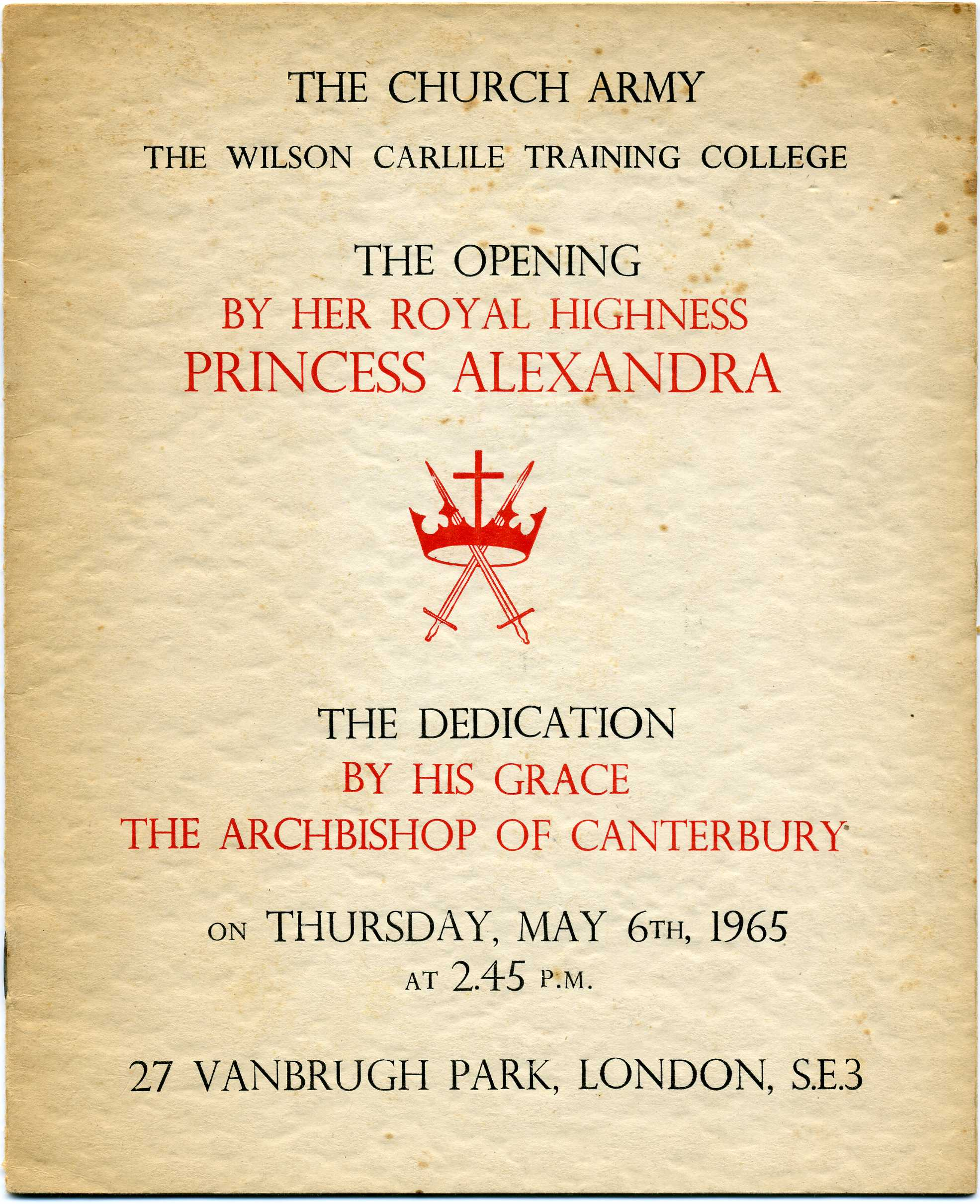
Programme for 6 May 1965 opening of chapel

The foundation stone was laid in March 1964. The chapel was part of the Church Army Wilson Carlile Training College designed by the same architect, and was opened by Princess Alexandra, at 2.45 pm on 6 May 1965, the opening being commemorated on a marble stone in a cloakroom off the entrance lobby to the chapel. The late R.G.D. (Russell) Vernon MBE, head of Austin Vernon & Partners under whose banner the chapel was designed by E.T. Spashett, was invited to the opening at which the Archbishop of Canterbury Michael Ramsey was to consecrate the chapel.

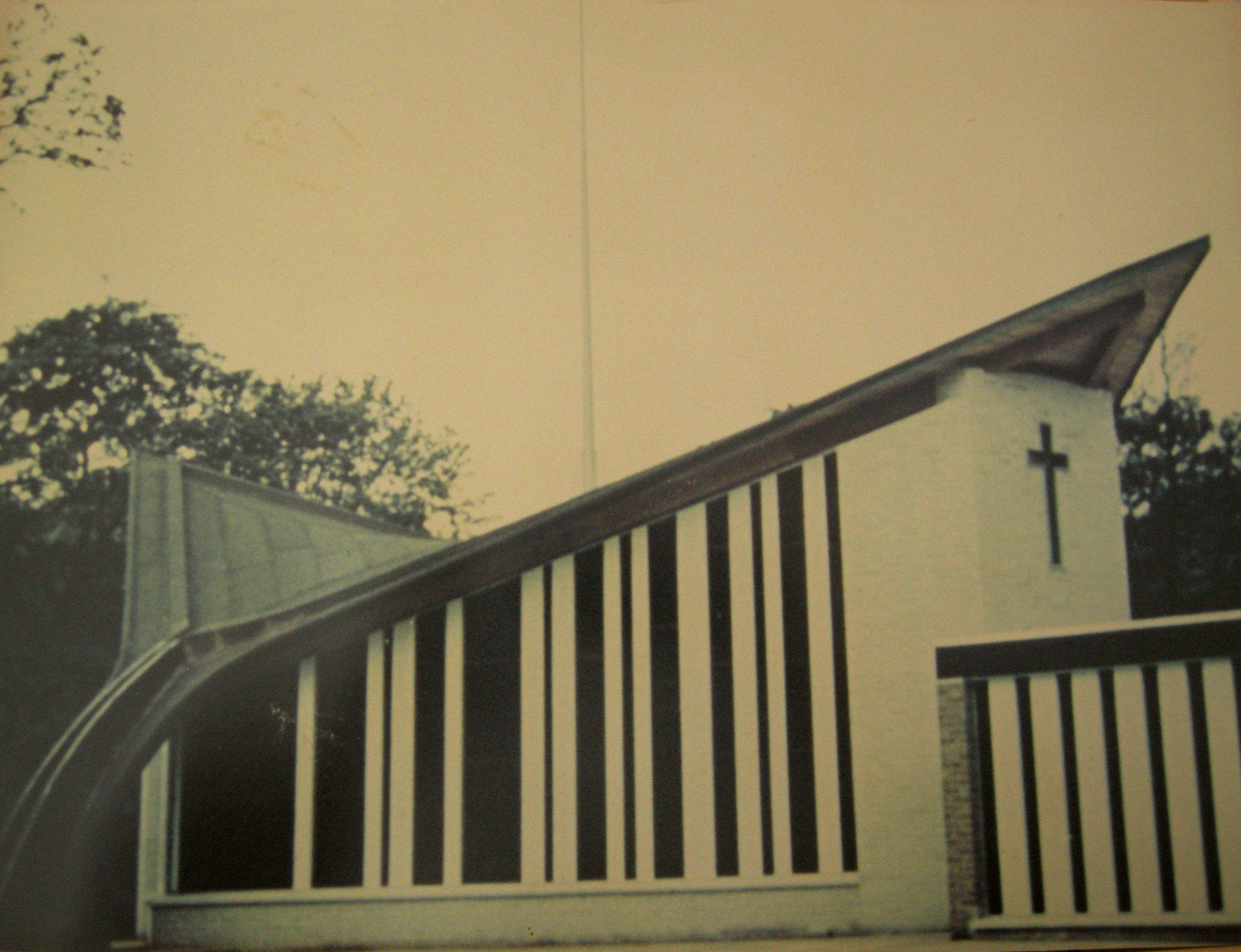
Print of the chapel showing part of spire, 1965

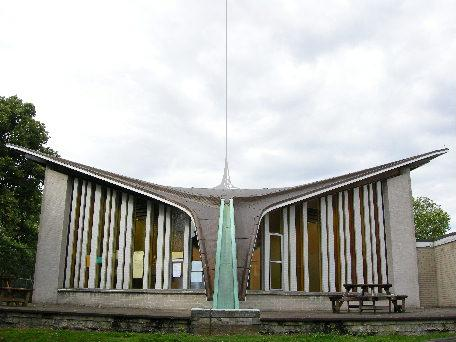
South elevation, 2009, with missing spire drawn onto image

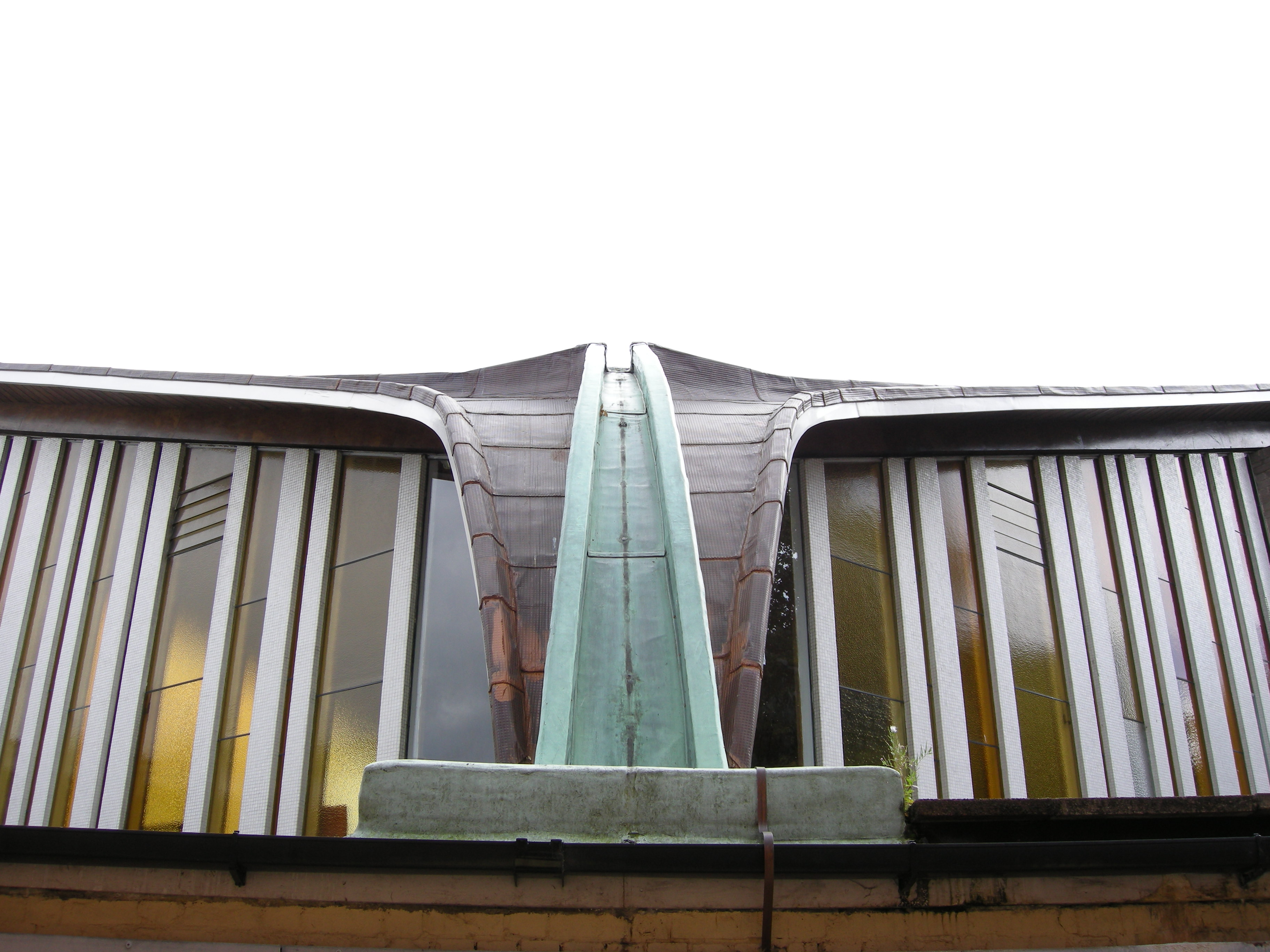
North elevation, 2009

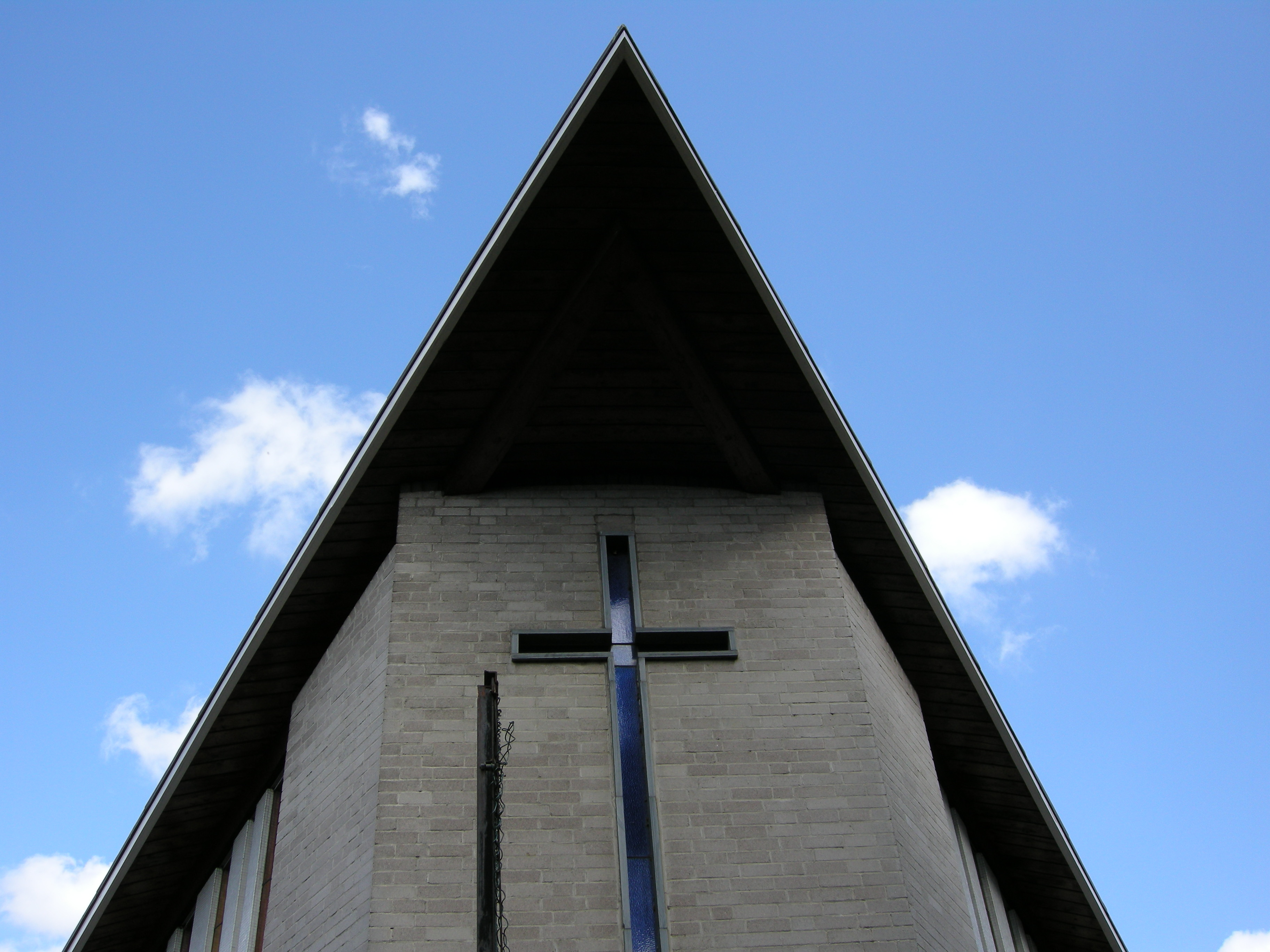
West elevation, 2009
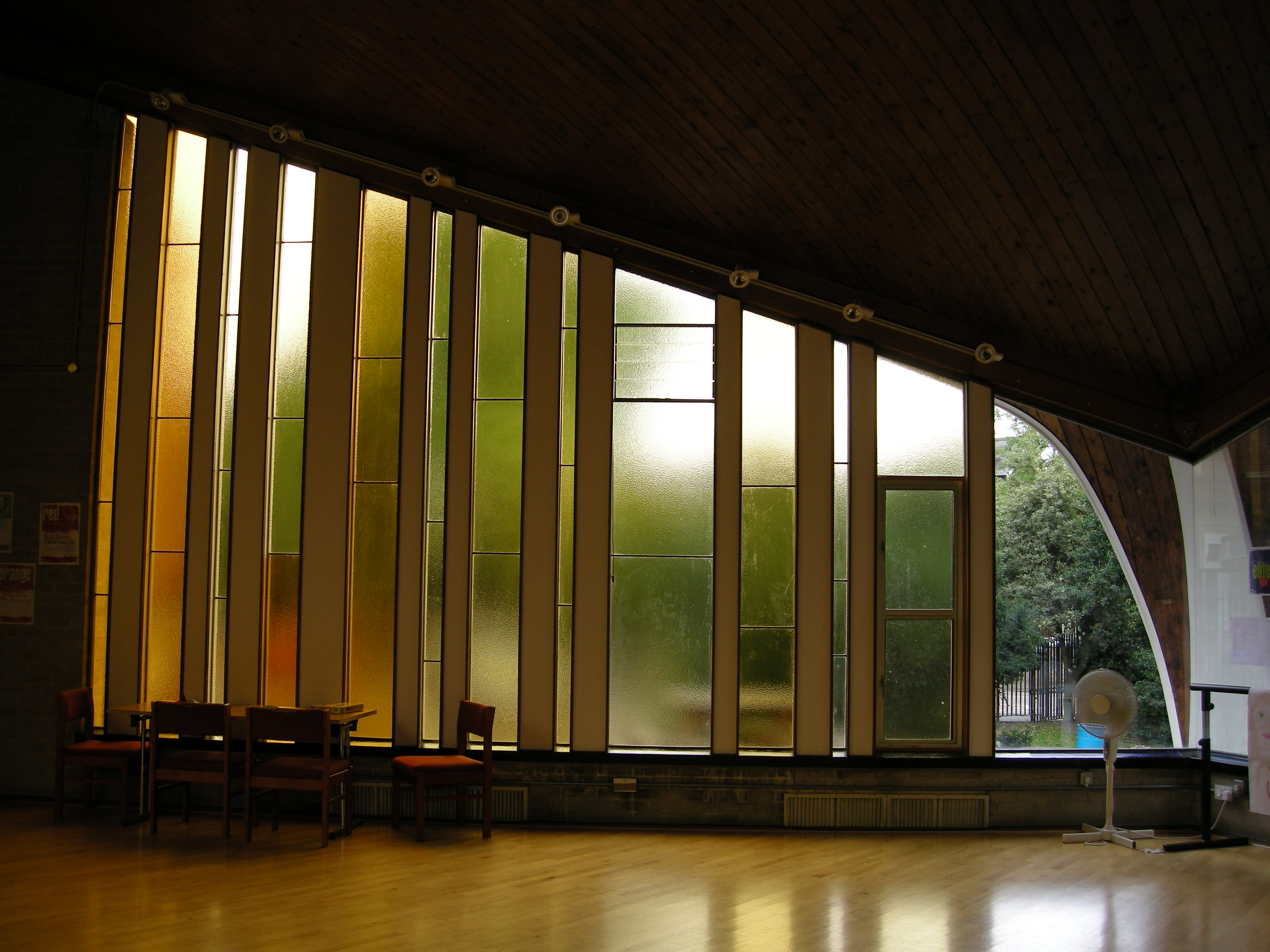
Interior, 2009, looking south-east

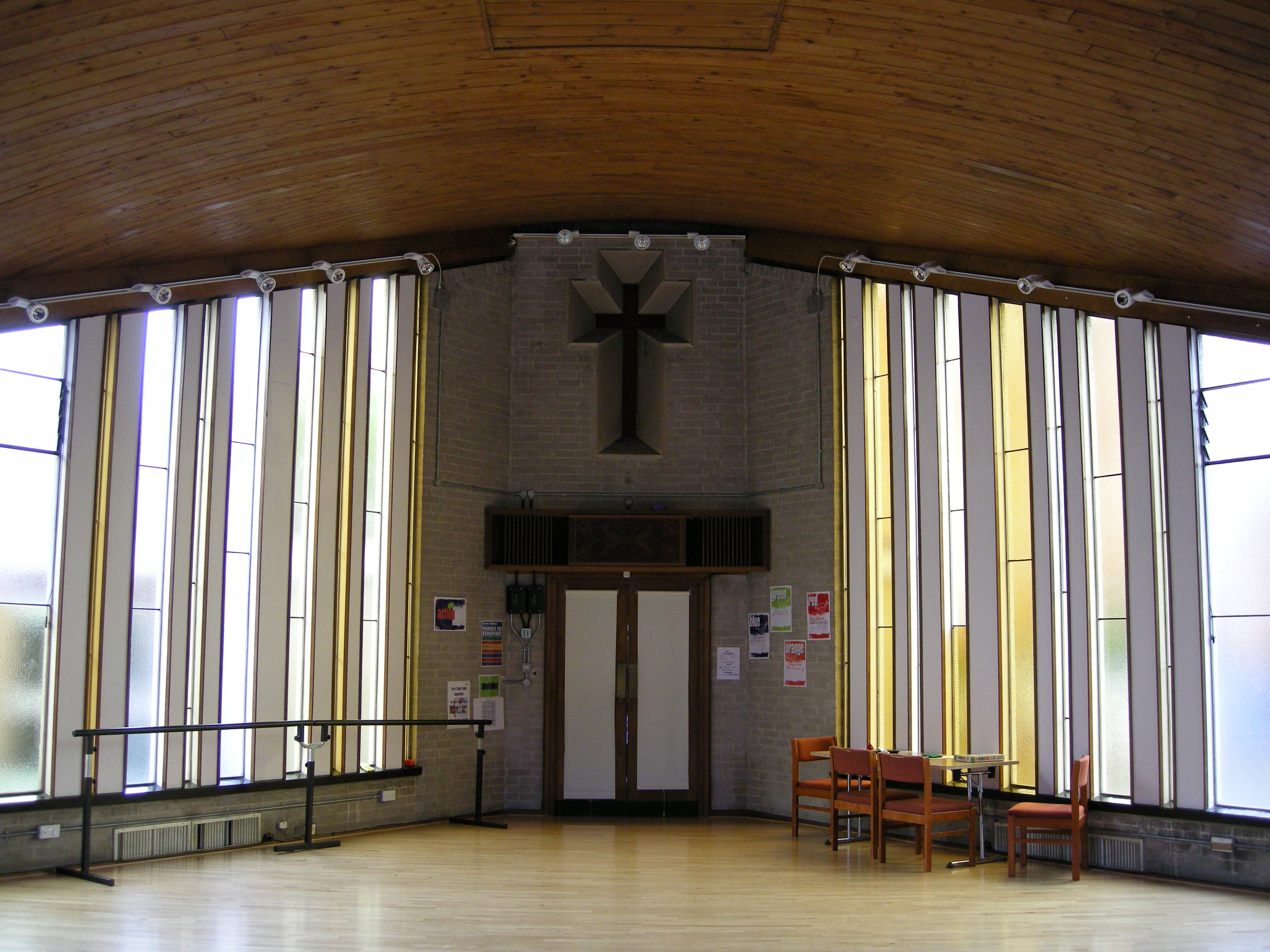
Interior, 2009, looking east (blue glass window blocked outside)

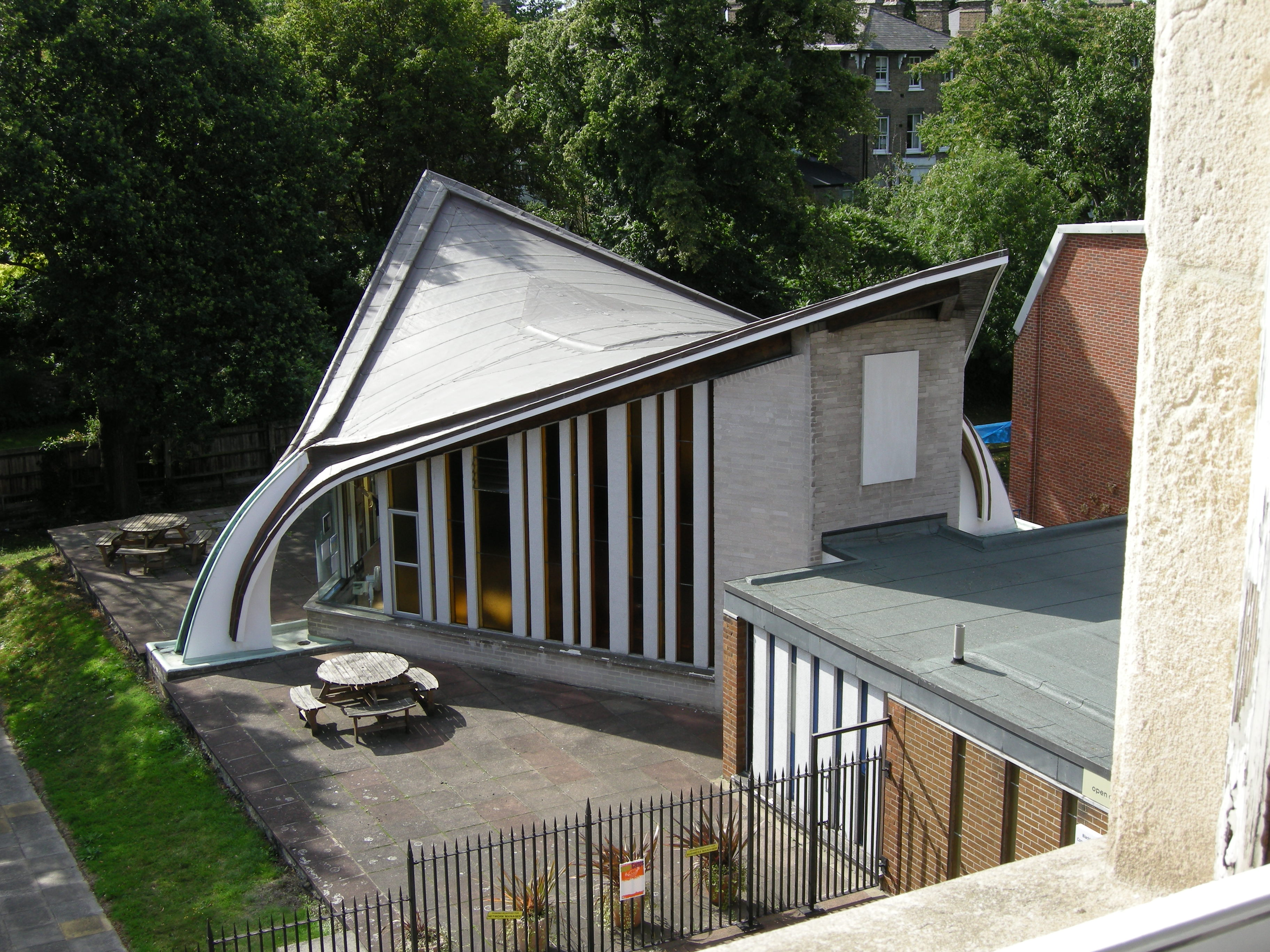
South-east and east elevations, 2009, showing roof curve and spire fixing plate.

Pews and west-end altar in chapel, 1965

== Architect: E. T. Spashett ==
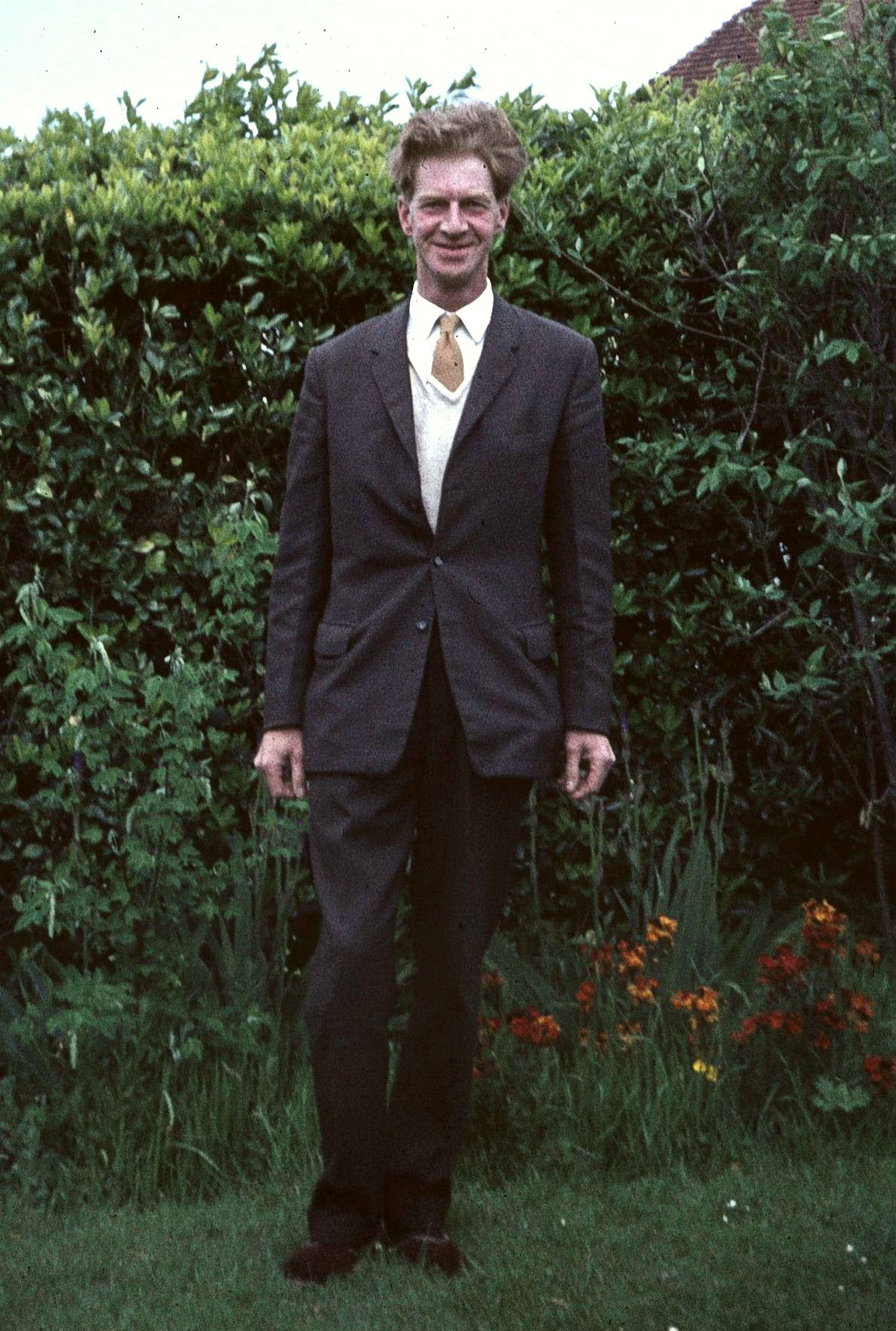
The architect E.T. Spashett ARIBA in 1965

Ernest Trevor Spashett (1923–1994) was born in Penzance and served in the Royal Air Force 1942–1947, gaining his wings in 1945, and flying Halifaxes in Bomber Command. He was apprenticed to architect F.G. Drewitt in Penzance, Cornwall, (Note: Architect Frederick George Drewitt (Congleton 1877 – Penzance 1958). GRO index: Births Mar 1877 Drewitt Frederick George Congleton 8a 341. Deaths Sep 1958 Drewitt Frederick George 81 Penzance 7a 85.) before World War II, designing under supervision the Guildhall at St Ives in 1939 at the age of 16. After the war he trained as an architect with the Ministry of Works repairing London after the war, working on Alexandra Palace, Clarence House, (Note: As part of a Ministry of Works team refurbishing for Princess Elizabeth and Prince Philip.) and Osterley House among others. (Note: For the Ministry of Works. Information from architect's archives) For example, Osterley House was then an RAF convalescence home full of airmen in wheelchairs and on crutches. The zig-zag, half-fenced ramp he designed for the front steps instantly became a racetrack, and had to be heavily fenced after too many skid turns on the corners created flying wheelchairs. He designed the replacement rose window for Alexandra Palace, the original being lost due to bomb damage. (Note: Archives of the architect.) After qualifying as an architect he worked for Cambridge, Gillingham and Birmingham Councils designing council housing, schools and hospitals. As a member of Gillingham's architectural department, he designed a carnival float for the town, representing "the four ancient manors or courts of Gillingham".

Spashett worked with Yates, Cook and Derbyshire in London from around 1954 to around 1960, then from around 1960 with Austin Vernon & Partners (who had refurbished Dulwich Picture Gallery) in Dulwich from 1959, leaving after the chapel opening debacle in 1965. He specialised in church design and restoration, so in the 1960s and 1970s he was consultant architect for the Benedictines, taking instructions from Basil Hume. In the 1970s he designed accommodation at two monasteries, including a large, reflective, gold, cross-shaped window (now lost) at Gorton Monastery, Manchester, which at certain seasons caused a gold cross-shaped reflection on the public roadway. (Note: Information from the archivist at Gorton Monastery, Manchester) From 1965 he was architect for estate agents Geering and Colyer in Tunbridge Wells, then left to work freelance in Tunbridge Wells 1982–1989. (Note: Spashett continued freelance work in Herne Bay, Kent until retirement due to ill health in 1992.) He died on 21 March 1994.

=== Owners of the chapel and college ===
The first owner was the Church Army, who needed the buildings for their Wilson Carlile Training College in 1965. The training college was named after Wilson Carlile, the founder of the Church Army. The training college moved to Sheffield in 1991–92. The premises were sold by the Church Army in 1994 to Blackheath High School, which between 1999 and 2009 was using the chapel as a music room and dance studio.

== Wilson Carlile Training College site 1965 ==
The chapel was part of a larger build in 1965, and was designed to form part of the south side of an open, central quadrangle (see image of architectural model). The east side consisted of older buildings, and the west side was open, so the only other major new build was the large dormitory block on the north side. This was an international style building of white brick with metal-framed windows and black slate panels between the windows and covering the sills. Only two staircases and the upper part of the west end of this block remain in original condition, as there has been much development on the site since 1965. The description of the site in the May 1965 opening day programme is as follows:

"The new College has accommodation for seventy-two students and in addition three flats are provided nearby for married students and their families. Staff are accommodated either in the College or in adjoining houses, provision has been made for four lecture rooms, library, common rooms etc., and the grounds which cover two acres include spacious lawns and an asphalt area for tennis and netball." (Note: The programme incorrectly names Russell Vernon as architect: Spashett designed the build for Austin Vernon & Partners, of which Vernon was the director.)

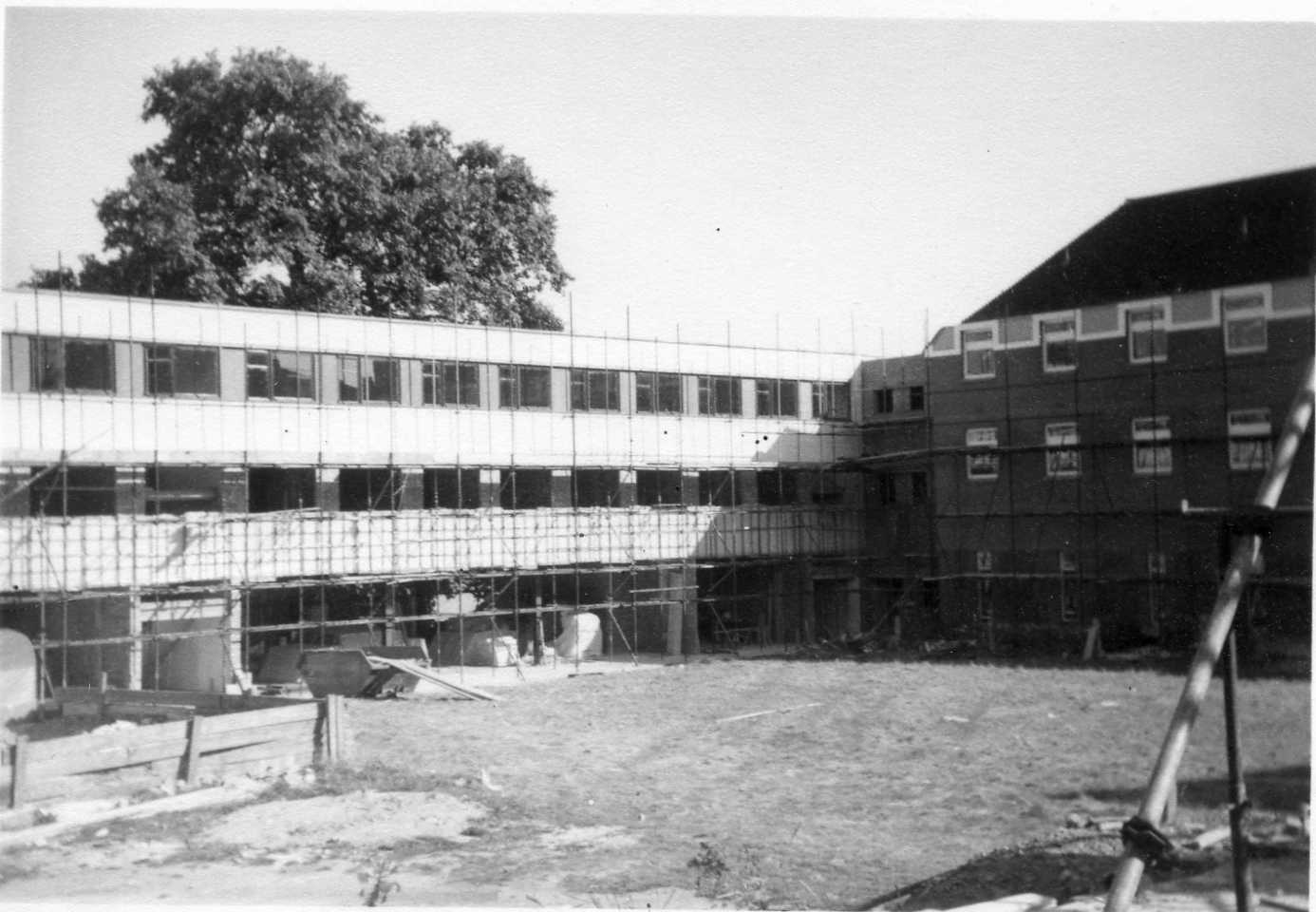
Dormitory block being built, 1965

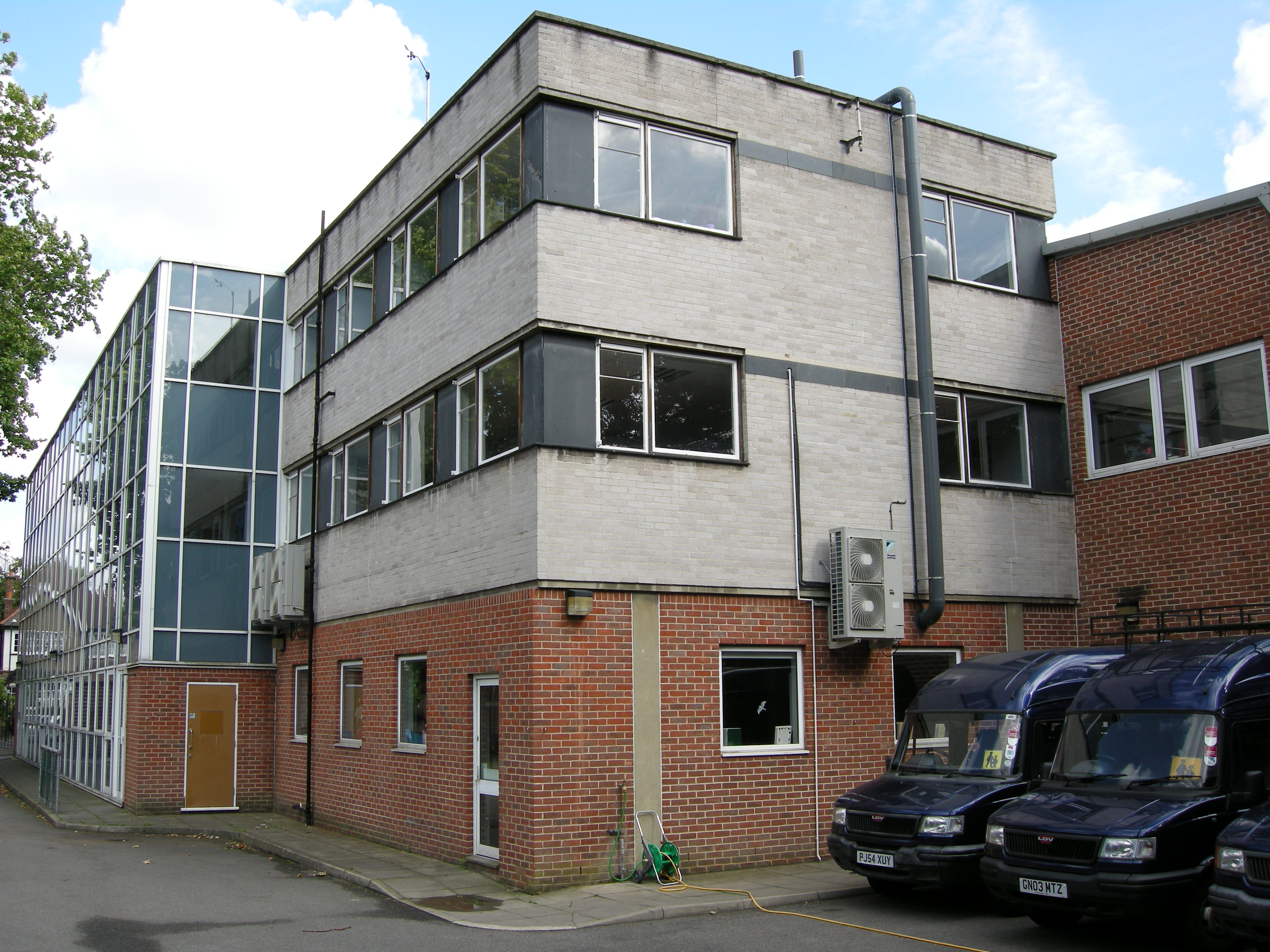
West end of former dormitory block in 2009

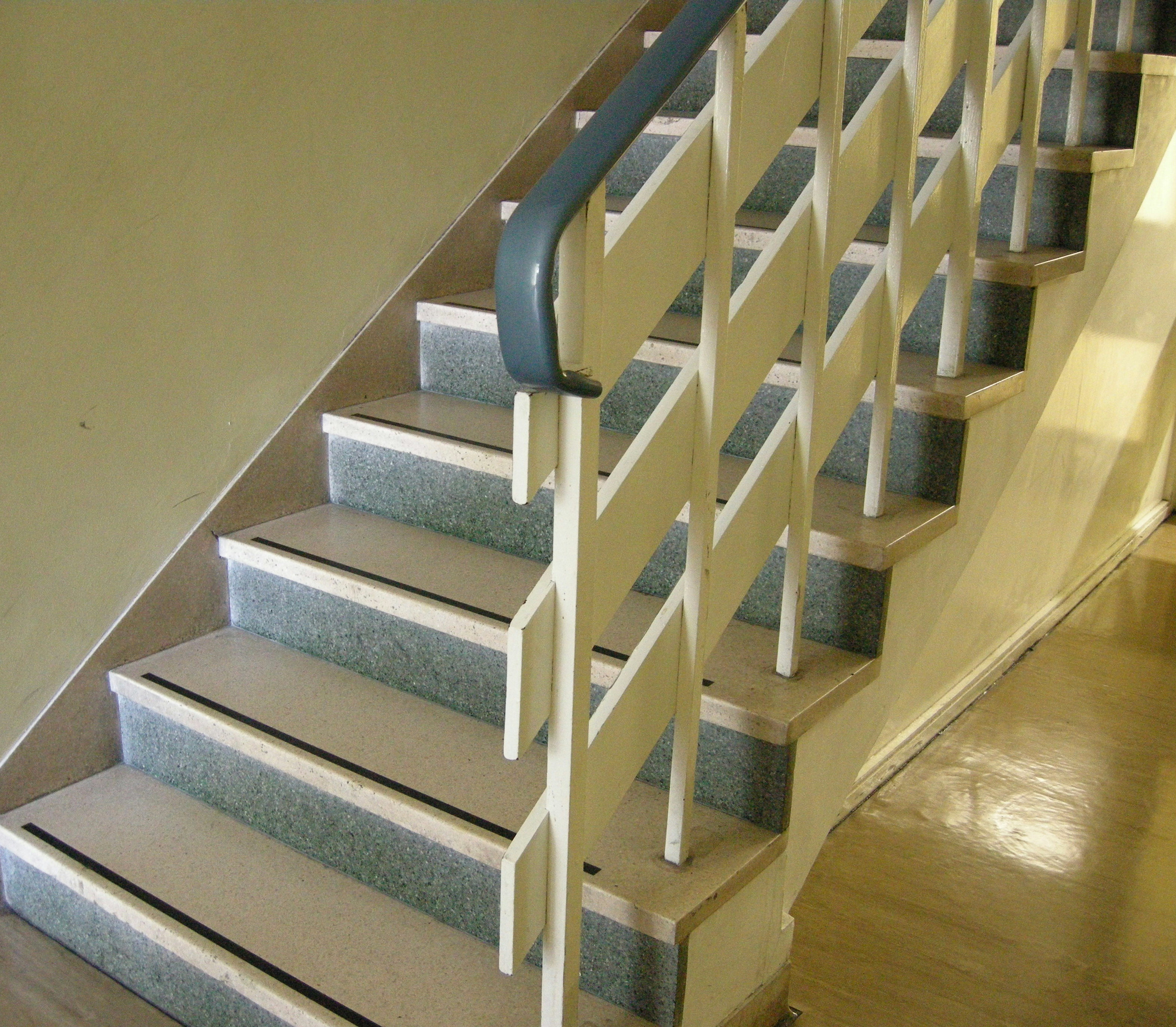
Staircase in dormitory block in 2009

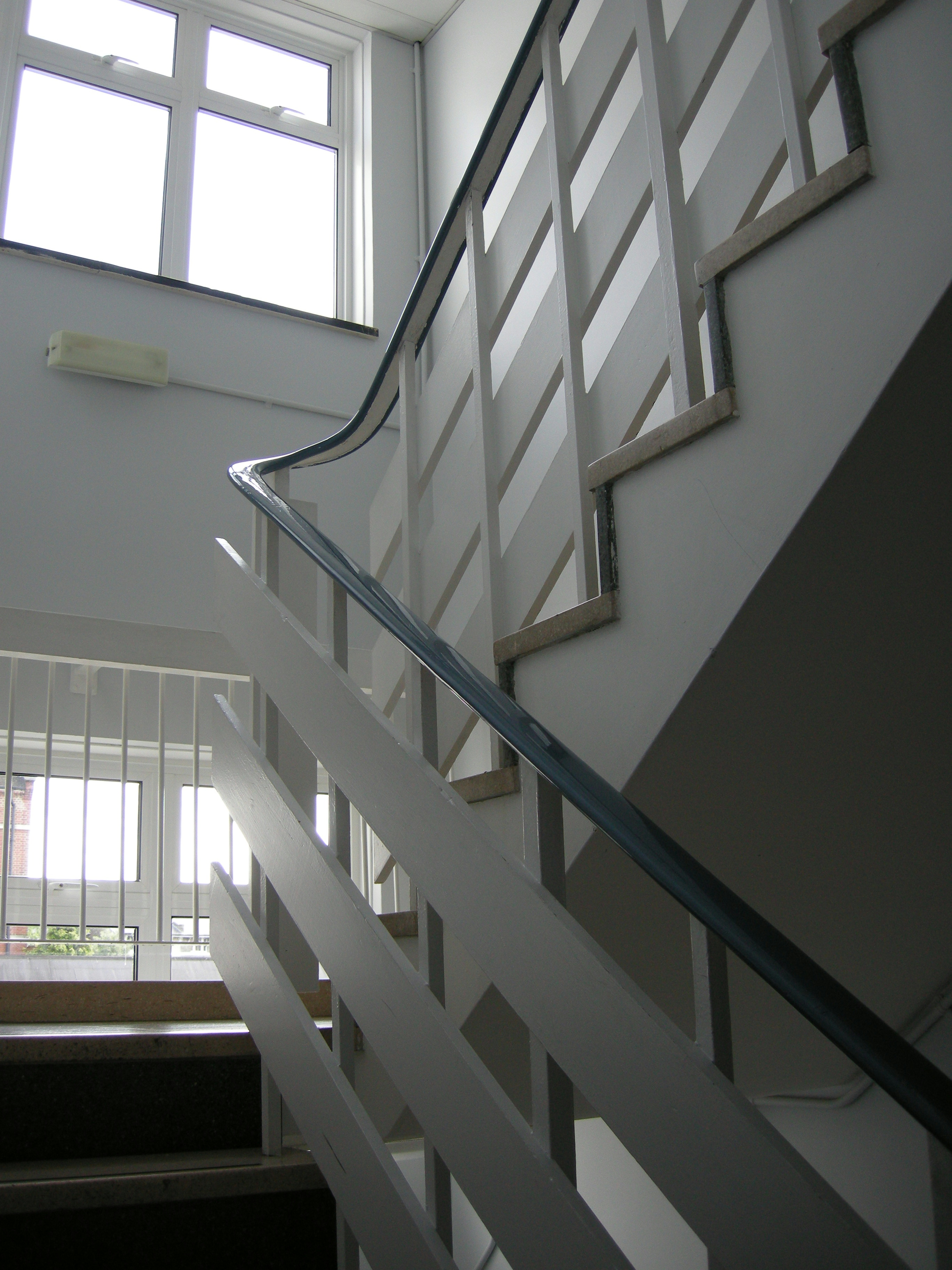
Staircase in dormitory block in 2009

== RIBA archives holdings ==
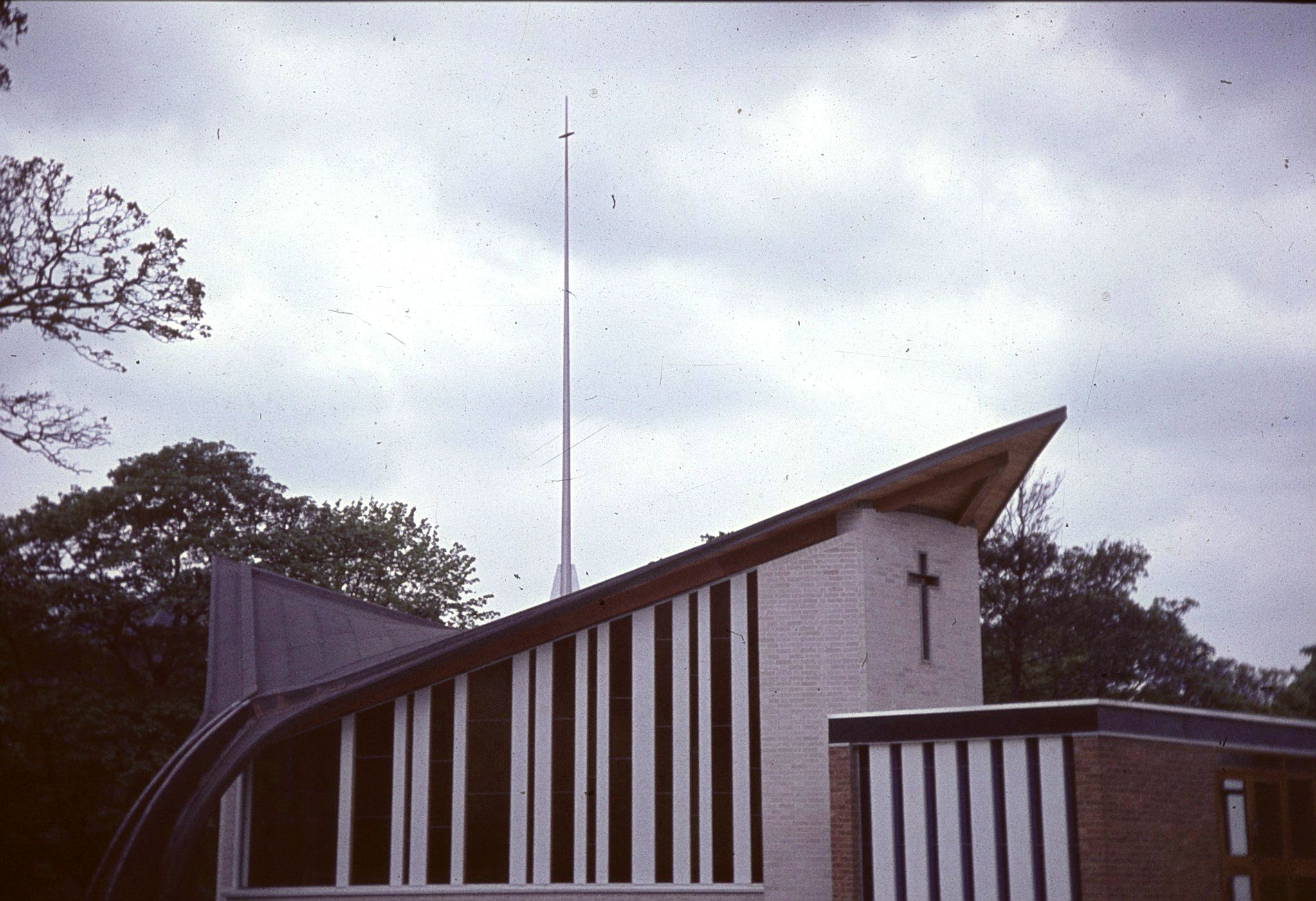
The chapel in 1965

Five black and white photographs dated 1975 are held in the RIBA Archives as part of their Press Office collection and described as follows:

- London: Church Army's Chapel, Blackheath: ext view showing double-curved roof (architects Austin Vernon & Partners, 1965) (BM/ECCL/40/A) (photo G. Hana Ltd 28978)
- London: Church Army's Chapel, Blackheath: ext view (architects Austin Vernon & Partners, 1965) (BM/ECCL/40/B) (photo G. Hana Ltd 28976)
- London: Church Army's Chapel, Blackheath: ext view showing double-curved roof (architects Austin Vernon & Partners, 1965) (BM/ECCL/40/C) (photo G. Hana Ltd 28977)
- London: Church Army's Chapel, Blackheath: int view (architects Austin Vernon & Partners, 1965) (BM/ECCL/40/D) (photo G. Hana Ltd 28975)
- London: Church Army's Chapel, Blackheath: int view (architects Austin Vernon & Partners, 1965) (BM/ECCL/40/E) (photo G. Hana Ltd 28974)

The above images can be viewed at RIBA's architecture.com site, under the title "Church Army Chapel, Vanbrugh Park, Blackheath. London." or "Austin Vernon".
