= Mark Russell (charity director) =

Northern Irish charity executive

Mark Russell OBE

Chief Executive of The Children's Society
- Incumbent
- Assumed office 2019
- Preceded by: Matthew Reed

Chief Executive of Church Army
- In office 2006–2019
- Preceded by: Philip Johanson
- Succeeded by: Des Scott

Personal details
- Born: Mark Kenneth Russell; 25 June 1974 (age 52) Northern Ireland
- Education: Queen's University Belfast
- Occupation: Chief executive

Mark Kenneth Russell OBE (born 25 June 1974) is a charity executive. Since 2019, he has served as the Chief Executive of The Children's Society. He has additionally served as a lay member of the General Synod of the Church of England and of the Archbishops' Council, both from 2005 to 2011 and from 2015 to 2019. He was previously a local preacher in the Methodist Church in Ireland, and was a reader in the Church of England.

== Early life and education ==
Russell was born on 25 June 1974 and brought up in Northern Ireland. He was educated at Portadown College, a grammar school in Portadown, County Armagh. He studied law at Queen's University Belfast, graduating with a Bachelor of Laws (LLB) degree in 1995.

== Career ==
At the age of 21, Russell was licensed as a local preacher in the Methodist Church in Ireland. From 1997 to 2000, he was a youth pastor at a Methodist church in Lurgan, County Armagh. He was also a member of the Conference of the Methodist Church in Ireland between 1996 and 1998.

In 2000, Russell moved to England to become a youth minister at Christ Church, Chorleywood, an evangelical Anglican church in Chorleywood, Hertfordshire, and a member of the Church of England. In 2005, he was elected as a lay member of the General Synod of the Church of England and appointed to the Archbishops' Council as its youngest member. In 2006, he left Chorleywood having been appointed chief executive officer of Church Army, an Anglican evangelistic charity working in the United Kingdom and Ireland. He was a member of the council of the Evangelical Alliance from 2007 to 2012. He was made an honorary canon of Worcester Cathedral in 2011. He stepped down from the General Synod and the Archbishops' Council at the end of 2011. In November 2015, he was re-elected to the General Synod as a lay representative for the Diocese of Sheffield and re-appointed to the Archbishops' Council. His term of office ended in 2019.

In April 2019, he was announced as having been appointed chief executive officer of the Children's Society. He took up the post in August. In the 2026 New Year Honours, he was appointed Officer of the Order of the British Empire (OBE) "for services to charity".

=== Views ===
Russell is a supporter of Diverse Church, an organisation for LGBT Christians attending evangelical churches in the UK. He wrote the foreword of Amazing Love: Theology for Understanding Discipleship, Sexuality and Mission (2016), a collection of essays by Anglican theologians that affirm LGBT relationships for Christians.

Russell supports the ordination of women as deacons, priests, and bishops in the Church of England.

As of 2014, Russell was a member of the Labour Party, and a former executive of Christians on the Left.

== Personal life ==
Russell lives in London with his partner David.

Non-profit organization positions
Preceded by Matthew Reed as Chief Executive	Chief Executive of The Children's Society; 2019–present	Incumbent
