= Church Army =

Anglican organisation

- Founded: 1882
- Founder: Wilson Carlile
- Type: Non-profit, Christian
- Location: International
- Fields: Evangelism, outreach, social action, poverty relief
- Chief executive: Matt Barlow
- Website: churcharmy.org

The Church Army is an evangelistic organisation and mission community founded in 1882 in association with the Church of England and now operating internationally in many parts of the Anglican Communion.

== History ==
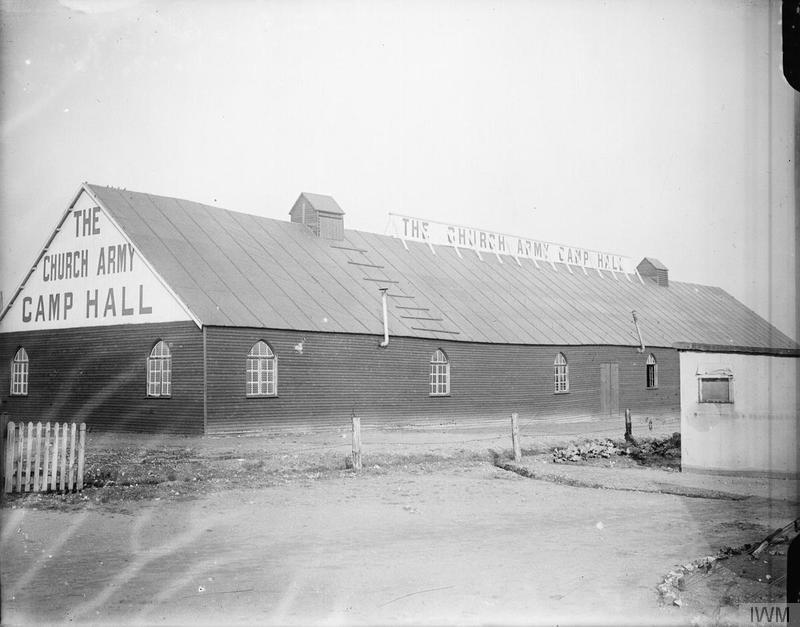
The Church Army Camp Hall in Rouen, 1917

The Church Army was founded in England in 1882 by the Revd. Wilson Carlile (afterwards prebendary of St Paul's Cathedral), who brought together soldiers, officers and a few working men and women whom he and others trained to act as Church of England evangelists among the poor and outcasts of the Westminster slums. As a curate in the parish of St Mary Abbots, Kensington, Carlile had experimented with unorthodox forms of Christian meetings and witness, going to where coachmen, valets and others would take their evening stroll and holding open air services, persuading onlookers to say the Scripture readings, and training working people to preach. Carlile wanted to share the Gospel with people who would not dream of setting foot inside a church and training people of the same class—ordinary lay people—as evangelists.

At the same time, similar groups were appearing; the Revd. Evan Hopkins was organising a "Church Gospel Army" and other clergy had established a "Church Salvation Army" at Oxford and a "Church Mission Army" at Bristol. Carlile suggested a combined "Church Army".

As the work grew, a training institution for evangelists was started in Oxford with F. S. Webster as principal, but soon moved (1886) to London, where, in Bryanston Street near Marble Arch, the headquarters of the army was established. Working men were trained as evangelists, and working women as mission sisters, and were supplied to the clergy. The male evangelists had to pass an examination by the Archdeacon of Middlesex, and were then (from 1896) admitted by the bishop of London as "lay evangelists in the Church". The mission sisters likewise passed an examination by the diocesan inspector of schools. Church Army workers were entirely under the control of the incumbent of the parish to which they were sent, and were paid a small sum for their services either by the vicar or by voluntary local contributions. Church Army vehicles circulated throughout the country parishes, if desired, with itinerant evangelists, who held simple missions, without charge, and distributed literature.

Marie Louise Carlile (1861-1951), Wilson Carlile's sister, was a frail woman who left a life of elegance for the tough and austere life of training women in 1888, followed by the first "Rescue Shelter" for women in 1891. She continued in the mission for fifty years as leader of the Church Army Sisters.

William Booth had already seen the extreme poverty and need for unorthodox evangelism work, and since 1865 had been developing a similar mission (in 1878 given the name "The Salvation Army"), using similar "Christian soldier" metaphors, also in London slums. Church of England bishops approached Booth about the time Church Army was founded to join in their work in the slums, but he declined. Both the Church Army and the Salvation Army continued to work in the slums; both had some difficulty with their parent churches (Church of England and Methodist) being able to cope with those coming out of the slums as a result of the mission work, and realised the need for alcohol-free refuges.

In 1888, the Church Army established labour homes in London and elsewhere, with the object of giving a "fresh start in life" to the outcast and destitute. The inmates earned their board and lodging by piece work, for which they were paid at the current trade rates, and were encouraged to seek other positions for themselves. The Church Army had lodging homes, employment bureaus, cheap food depots, old clothes department, a dispensary and a number of other social works. There was also an extensive emigration system, under which many hundreds (3,000 in 1906) of men and families were placed in permanent employment in Canada through the agency of the local clergy.

During the First World War, the Church Army was very active among the troops in France, and ran around 2000 social clubs across France.

In 1965, a new chapel, the Church Army Chapel, Blackheath and college designed by E. T. Spashett in Vanbrugh Park, Blackheath, London SE3 was opened by Princess Alexandra and consecrated by Michael Ramsey. The Headquarters were in Marylebone Road, London NW. In 1978, the Church Army purchased Winchester House, a former missionary school (see Eltham College) in Blackheath, south-east London, to be refurbished as its new headquarters. It was officially opened by the Queen Mother on 12 June 1980. In 1992, the Church Army vacated the Vanbrugh Park college buildings and the college was relocated to Sheffield; the buildings were taken over by Blackheath High School.

In 2010, the national office of the Church Army relocated from Sidcup in London to the Wilson Carlile Centre in Sheffield (formerly the training college), bringing together the national staff with the training and research staff. Training became non-residential and the building was converted to provide national offices and modern conferencing facilities together with en-suite accommodation.

== Principles and practices ==
The Church Army has over 300 commissioned evangelists who have been commissioned and admitted in the Church of England after 2–4 years of training. Church Army Evangelists will not necessarily work directly for the Church Army but may instead work in Anglican churches, projects and teams in the United Kingdom and Ireland. There are similarities to the Salvation Army, and the two sometimes work together (such as in the Fresh expressions initiative), but the Church Army is not a separate church denomination.

The Church Army's funded work focuses on centres of mission and key projects and tends to operate in areas of deprivation.

The first centre of mission was established in 2008 and many more have been launched across the UK and Ireland since. A centre of mission is formed in partnership with a Church of England diocese in order to support the Christian outreach in an area. A centre of mission's purpose is to support and connect with communities, normally with high levels of poverty, outside of the church. This work does not operate from a physical building but sees partnerships with local initiatives and organisations and setting up new groups and activities for a community. The work is contextual and varied depending on the needs of an area. Some examples of the work that centres of mission do include setting up youth groups, running foodbanks and food provision services, launching fresh expressions of Church to help people engage with God outside of a traditional church service setting, and supporting the homeless, lonely, those struggling with poverty, sex workers, and other isolated or marginalised groups.

Church Army key projects include:

- Cardiff Residential Services (supporting homeless young people in Cardiff through accommodation at Ty Bronna and wider support)
- The Amber Project (supporting young people in Cardiff and surrounding areas who have experience of self-harm, through counselling, workshops, theatre groups, and informal support)
- Marylebone Project (working with homeless women in London as one of the largest women's only hostels in the UK and Ireland, wrap-around support, and rough sleeper drop in)
- Made in Marylebone (a social enterprise for homeless women in London, providing training and work experience in catering and business)

The current president of the Church Army is Rowan Williams, previous Archbishop of Canterbury and before him Desmond Tutu, emeritus Archbishop of Cape Town and Nobel Peace Prize laureate was the president.

Every September, the Church Army celebrates Church Army Sunday; this is the Sunday nearest 26 September (the anniversary of Carlile's death in 1942), the day on which Carlile and the Church Army are celebrated in the revised Anglican Lectionary.

Des Scott was appointed interim CEO in June 2019 after Mark Russell's resignation, and was the Church Army's CEO, leading the organisation in the United Kingdom and Ireland. Scott has been part of the Church Army for over 30 years in various roles including as a London youth worker, overseeing the Church Army's operational team, and held the post of deputy CEO from 2012 until being appointed as interim CEO.

== Church Army International ==
Church Army International, established in 2006, is an association of eight independent Church Army societies around the world (Africa, Australia, Barbados, Canada, Jamaica, New Zealand, United Kingdom and Ireland, and the United States) working in over 15 countries. The purpose is to facilitate communication, co-operation, fellowship and shared vision between Church Army societies and to promote the growth of the Church Army's ministry worldwide.

The leader of each society is a member of the Church Army International Leaders' Forum chaired by the international secretary. The forum has four telephone conferences each year and the leaders together with those responsible for training and board representatives meet together for a residential conference approximately every three years.

In 2009 the Church Army in Canada was renamed Threshold Ministries.

== Training ==
The Church Army trains individuals in evangelism vocation. A selection process by the Church Army ascertains whether a vocation in evangelism is suited to an individual before beginning a 2-4 year training course. Church Army training aims to develop understanding of pioneering evangelism. All training is part-time alongside other work or personal commitments to allow learning to be practiced in context. Training includes opportunities for practical mission, weekend training residentials with interactive teaching sessions, and sessions with a Reflector with whom to discuss growth and personal development.

In the past, the Church Army training was full-time residential. Between 1965 and 1991 the Wilson Carlile Training College was at 27 Vanburgh Park, Blackheath, where the premises included the Church Army Chapel. The last training college was at the Wilson Carlile Centre in Sheffield. The buildings previously used for residential evangelists is now a conferencing centre and accommodation.

Each additional Church Army Society internationally is responsible for the training of its evangelists. In some situations, students are paired with evangelists currently serving in the field; others attend residential schooling.

== Leadership ==
General secretary

- 1942–1949: The Revd. Hubert H. Treacher
- 1949–1951: The Revd. Edward Wilson Carlile; grandson of Wilson Carlile

Chief secretary

- 1951–1960: The Revd. Edward Wilson Carlile; title changed from General Secretary to Chief Secretary
- 1960–1976: The Revd. Donald Lynch
- 1976–1984: The Revd. Michael Turnbull; later Bishop of Durham
- 1984–1990: The Revd. Michael Rees
- 1990–2006: Philip Johanson; first lay person appointed leader of Church Army

Chief executive

- 2006–2019: Mark Russell; title changed from Chief Secretary to Chief Executive
- 2019–2021: Des Scott
- 2021–2024: Peter Rouch
- 2024-present: Matt Barlow
