= Mary Grimes =

Mary Grimes may refer to:

- Mary Grimes (charity worker) (1861–1921), British promoter of emigration
- May McGee (1944–2025), née Mary Grimes, Irish women's rights activist
- Mary Grimes (basketball), American basketball coach and player
