= St John's Church, Ealing =

Coordinates: 51.5099°N 0.3172°W

St John's, Ealing
- St. John with St. James PCC
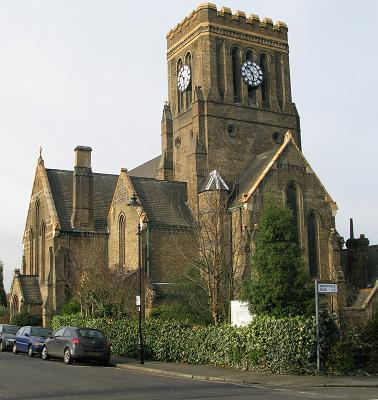
- St John's, Ealing
- Location: Mattock Lane, West Ealing, London, W13 9LA
- Country: England
- Denomination: Church of England
- Website: http://www.stjohnsealing.org.uk/

Architecture
- Architect: Edwin Henry Horne
- Years built: 1876, reconstructed (after the 1920 fire) in 1923

Administration
- Diocese: London
- Parish: St John with St James

St John's, Ealing, is an Anglican church in West Ealing, London, England. The church has been designated as a Grade II listed building.

== History ==
Built in 1876 by Edwin Henry Horne, it burned down in 1920, and was rebuilt and re-opened in 1923.

St John's first two vicars were, unusually, father (Julius Summerhayes) succeeded by son (Julius James Summerhayes), and between them they pastored the church for the first 64 years of its life. According to church documents, in the late 19th century the church founded the local cottage hospital and St John's School, and in early years of the 20th century recorded regular congregations of more than 1000 at both morning and evening services.

== Notable clergy ==
A notable curate at St John's around 1927 was Eric Nash ("Bash") who went on to lay the foundations for the postwar growth in British evangelical Christianity by founding the Iwerne camps that resulted in a number of boys from leading public schools becoming Christians and subsequently entering Christian ministry.

In more recent years, Sally Hitchiner was curate from 2009 to 2012, during which time she developed a role as a media commentator and was frequency seen on television discussing religious affairs.

== Current activities ==
St John's hosts a Sunday congregation. STJOHNS@TEN is conventional contemporary evangelical Anglican worship. The Church also offers an early evening Cafe Church which is a fresh expression with many members who are or have recently been homeless or vulnerably housed. The Maze is a Sunday evening youth group. The Arabic-speaking Living Waters Arabic Church meets on Sunday afternoon, as does the Burmese-speaking Myanmar Christian Fellowship.

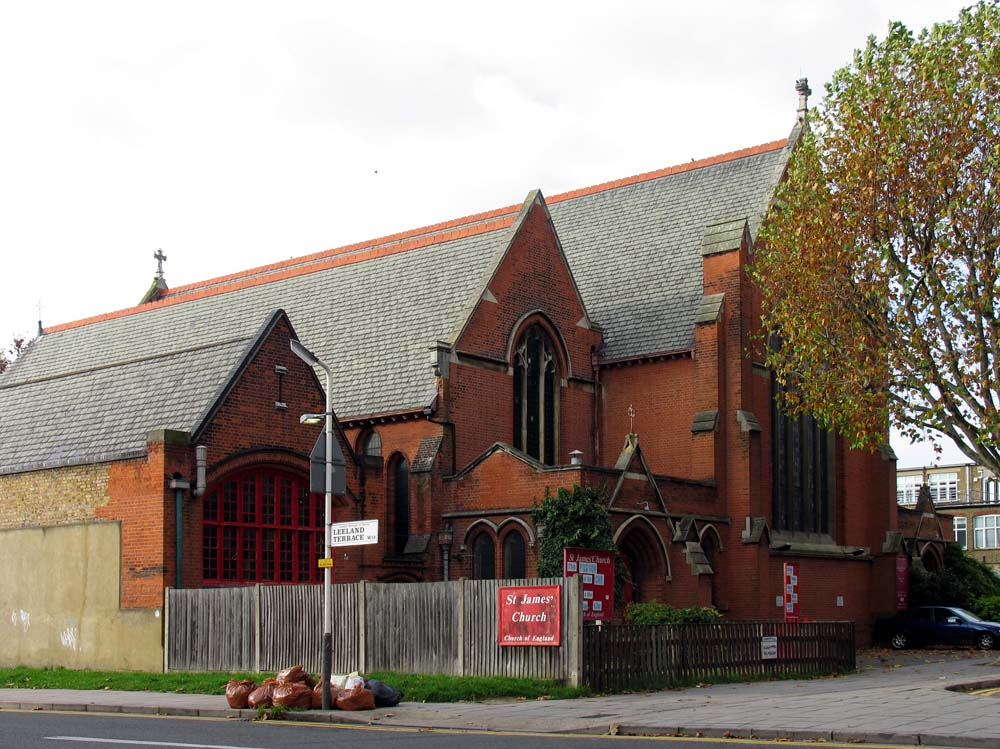
St James' Church in Ealing, which is in the same parish with St John

There are also a large number of midweek groups and activities.

St John's has a "sister" church, St James in West Ealing (currently closed), founded in 1900, disused later in the century and "re-planted" with a new congregation in the late 1980s

St John's is also the venue of the Ealing Soup Kitchen which has been supported by many local churches providing meals each Saturday and Sunday since 1973.
