= Sally Hitchiner =

21st-century English Anglican priest

The Reverend Sally Hitchiner
- Church: Church of England
- Diocese: Diocese of London

Personal details
- Born: 14 February 1980 (age 46) Liverpool, England
- Denomination: Anglicanism
- Partner: Fiona Hitchiner (née Green)
- Education: University of York; Wycliffe Hall, Oxford

Sally Hitchiner (born 1980) is an English Anglican priest.

== Early life and education ==
Sally Ann Hitchiner was born on 14 February 1980. From 1998 to 2001, she studied anthropology and social policy at the University of York where she achieved a first class honours. She then studied theology and trained for ordination at Wycliffe Hall, Oxford.

== Ordained Life ==
In 2008 Hitchiner became the Assistant Chaplain at St Peter's College, Oxford and served as Associate Chaplain for Post Graduate students at the Oxford Pastorate chaplaincy where she reinvented the Oxford University Socratic Society, debating philosophy and theology with those of different beliefs.

Hitchiner served her curacy at St John's Church, Ealing from 2009 to 2012, during which time she led the church's 18–30s group. She was interviewed on camera following the London riots in 2011, leading the community wide prayer vigil and representing faith groups in reflection committees. She led a movement towards community restorative justice and reconciliation.

Hitchiner co-founded the Being With Course and authored the Participants Companion. She has contributed chapters to a number of books including chapters on embodiment and church growth in a book on the Pandemic and on mission to a book celebrating the voices of ordained women who had become national experts in their fields.

From 2012 to 2019 she was Coordinating Anglican Chaplain and Interfaith Adviser at Brunel University, founding a number of fresh expressions of chaplaincy including a popular Faith Awareness course, focussing on understanding the different imaginations of the world and human flourishing rather than facts and figures about faith. Sally majors on non-reductionist methods of faith engagement with people.

Hitchiner was a member of General Synod, the Church of England's senior governing council from 2016 to 2021. Over this time she chaired committees on discipleship, religious life, youth evangelism and on outreach to council estates.

From 2019 to 2024 has been Associate Vicar for Ministry at St Martin-in-the-Fields, London, and has served as Head of Congregational Life and Public Ministry. Hitchiner led the church through the pandemic, bringing in an early adoption of live streaming services with theological and ecclesiological thought alongside this.

In October 2024 Hitchiner was instituted as the Rector of North Lambeth.

== Theology ==
Hitchiner's theology can be characterised as part of the post-liberal theology or narrative theology, particular influenced by Stanley Hauerwas and the post holocaust theology of Jurgen Moltmann. Her approach sticks closely to the account of Christ in the Biblical Gospels and attempts to listen with fresh curiosity in every situation, "being with" the other rather than attempting to fix them. In 2020 Hitchiner founded The Being With Course with Sam Wells as an introduction to the Christian faith based on these principles. This course is now used in churches around the world.

== Media ==
In 2009 she was spotted as a potential current affairs commentator and became a regular newspaper reviewer on Sky News from 2009 to 2015 then on BBC Breakfast from 2013 to 2019 being their regular Christmas Day guest over this time. She appeared Loose Women, GMTV, Newsnight, and other news and daytime programs. She developed an unlikely friendship with Richard Dawkins following jointly sitting with him as the subject for the semi-final of the Sky Arts National Portrait of the Year competition which was aired in December 2014.

== Personal life and views on LGBT rights ==
On 15 July 2014, Hitchiner was accidentally outed during a live appearance on television. Hitchiner opposes "gay-to-straight" conversion therapy and the Church of England's official stance against same-sex marriage. She is the founder of Diverse Church, a movement for young LGBT adults. She stated on BBC Breakfast on 3 September 2016 that she had recently become engaged to be Civilly Partnered, and she was united in a civil partnership with Fiona. Clergy in the Church of England are permitted to enter into same-sex civil partnerships.

Hitchiner advocates all sides in the debate working together constructively towards increased inclusion of LGBT people within the church and society.

In 2014, Hitchiner founded Diverse Church a national support group for 18–30 year old LGBT+ Christians. This group specialises in supporting those in the most conservative ends of the church, and welcomes all 18–30 year old LGBT Christians whatever their views are on ethics or theology. It places a high value on confidentiality, and there is no need to come out beyond the group when you join.
