= The Children's Society =

Child protection charity in the UK

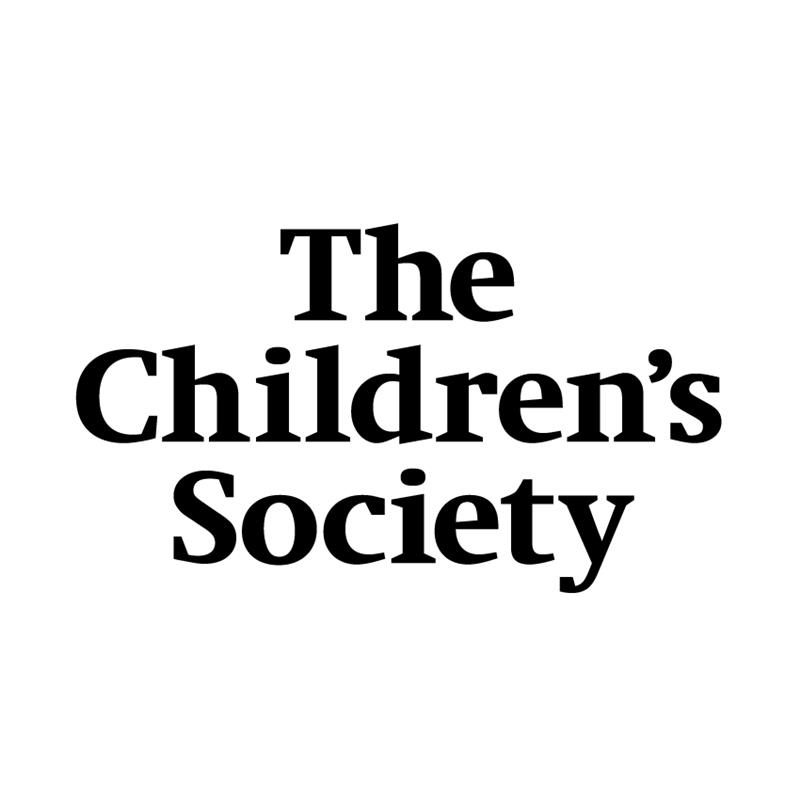

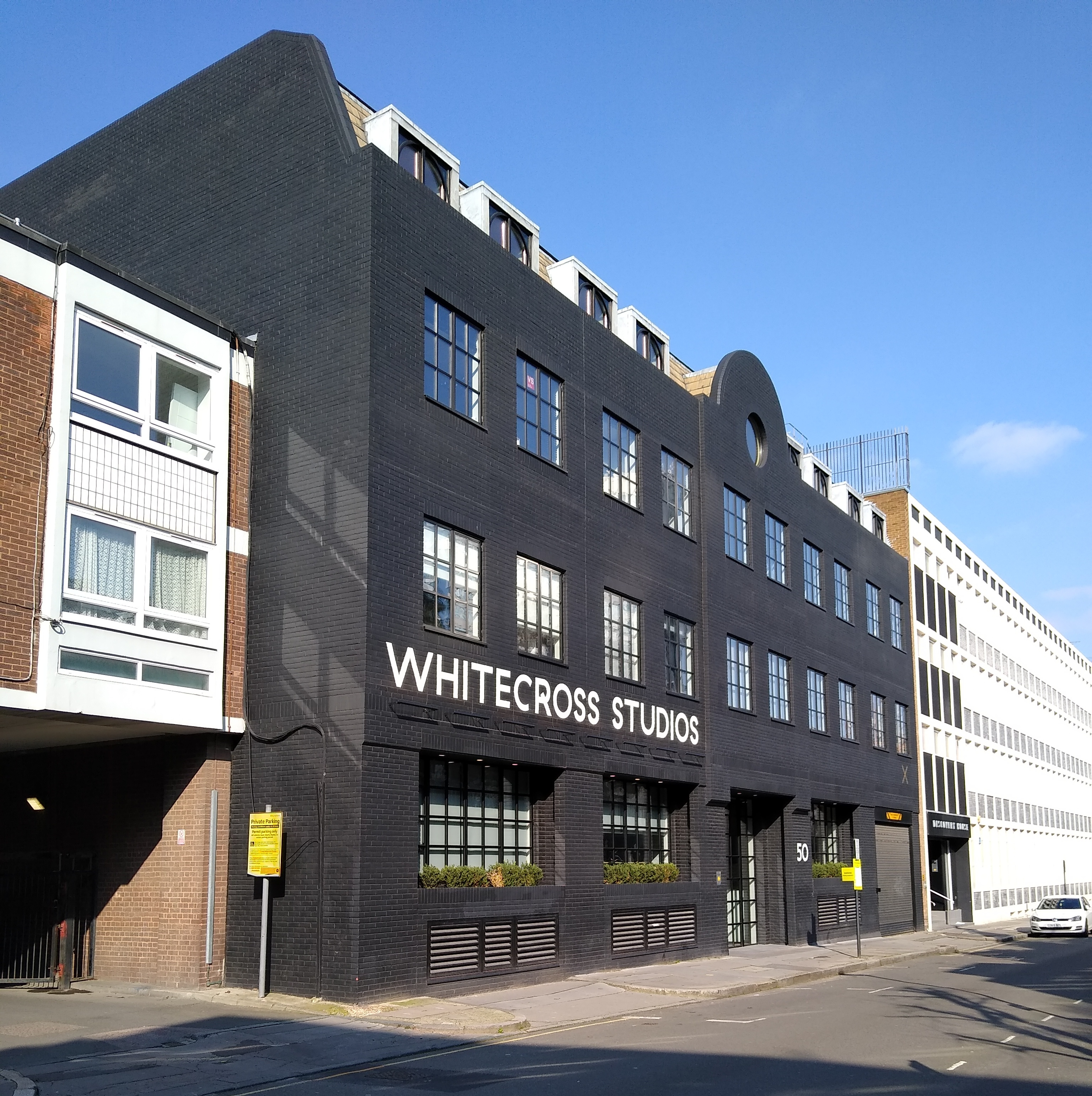
- Whitecross Studios, location of The Children's Society
- Founded: 1881; 145 years ago
- Founder: Edward Rudolf
- Type: Charity
- Registration no.: 221124
- Purpose: Children and young people
- Location: London, England
- Coordinates: 51°31′36.17″N 0°6′42.66″W
- Region served: England
- Key people: Mark Russell, Chief Executive (2019–)
- Revenue: £38.4m
- Website: www.childrenssociety.org.uk

The Church of England Children's Society, colloquially the Children's Society, is a United Kingdom national children's charity (registered No. 221124) allied to the Church of England.

The charity's objectives are to improve the lives of children and young people and the related social attitudes.

== History ==
The Children's Society was founded in the late nineteenth century by Edward Rudolf, a Sunday School teacher and civil servant in South London. Rudolf led a deputation to Archibald Tait, Archbishop of Canterbury to establish Church of England children's homes as an alternative to the large workhouses and orphanages common at that time. In 1881, the Church of England Central Home for Waifs and Strays was registered. It took the name Church of England Incorporated Society for Providing Homes for Waifs and Strays in 1893. In 1946, the title was changed to the Church of England Children's Society and it adopted the informal title of The Children's Society in 1982.

The first home was opened in Dulwich in 1882. Its success, together with a growing awareness of the scale of child poverty in England and Wales, led to the society's development. Between 1883 and 2015 the society sent over 2,000 children to Canada. Mary Grimes was said to be the epitome of women charity workers of the Waifs and Strays Society at the time. She served on the emigration committee and she led the Church Emigration Society. She coordinated the society's work with clergy in Australia, Canada, South Africa and New Zealand.

The Waifs and Strays Society moved to new offices at the Old Town Hall in Kennington Road in 1909. By 1919 the charity had 113 homes and cared for 5,000 children.

A main feature of The Children's Society's work was its insistence that children should not become long-term residents in homes, but boarded out, fostered or adopted. By the late 1960s The Children's Society had become one of the largest adoption agencies in the country.

In the late 1960s and the early 1970s, The Children's Society moved away from centralised care, fostering and adoption work and focused more on preventative work designed to support children and young people within their own families and communities. During the 1970s and 1980s The Children's Society introduced centres offering advice, play groups, youth clubs and short-term accommodation for young children. The society relocated from the Old Town Hall in Kennington Road to new offices at Kings Cross in 1986.

During the 1990s The Children's Society began focusing on social justice, lobbying to change legislation and welfare provision, and encouraging young people to speak and act for themselves.

The charity focuses on vulnerable children and young people aged 10 to 18 – including children who have been sexually exploited, children in care and young refugees. Its policy and campaigning work is informed by its direct practice, and research regarding children's well-being, child poverty and adolescent neglect.

The Children's Society was rebranded in 2014 by SomeOne. They abandoned their logo depicting a purple figure reaching for a star to a black and white logo. The new look is intended to reflect the charity's belief of confronting 'hard truths'.

In 2017, The Children's Society launched a new strategy aimed at disrupting the cycles of disadvantage that prevent young people from thriving by 2030. The Children's Society's strategy explores the complex challenges in young people's lives by focusing on three areas: risk, resilience and resources.

- Risk: The threats and dangers to a young person's safety which could include neglect and abuse, exploitation and violence.
- Resilience: A young person's capacity to respond to adversity at any given time which could include mental health or trauma.
- Resources: The resources available to meet a young person's needs which could include family support, money or social support.

== Finances ==
The charity's income in 2017–18 was £38.4m. This was largely voluntary income donated by supporters (£17.4m). A further £9.95m was generated by the provision of children's services and £10.82m from charity shops. Investments and other income contributed an additional £0.24m.

== Activities ==
=== The Good Childhood Inquiry and Report ===
The Children's Society is known for its research into children's well-being. It seeks to provide the a national picture on how children feel about their lives by asking children themselves. Over the last 12 years the charity has surveyed over 60,000 children as to how they think their lives are going.

In 2006 the charity commissioned an independent inquiry into modern childhood called The Good Childhood Inquiry. The rationale behind the inquiry was that, despite the 2003 Every Child Matters programme, unacceptable levels of disadvantage, poverty and social exclusion remained.

The Inquiry's report, A Good Childhood: Searching for Values in a Competitive Age, was published in 2009. It found that 'excessive individualism' is causing a range of problems for children today, including family break-up, teenage unkindness, unprincipled advertising, too much competition in education and acceptance of income inequality.

The charity went on to develop the Good Childhood Index in 2010 to provide a measure of subjective well-being in relation to 10 aspects of life for children over the age of eight. It surveys children on topics including their appearance, school life and family relationships among others.

Each year The Children's Society produces a report based on the index in partnership with the University of York called The Good Childhood Report.

This data are used by the Office for National Statistics' Measuring National Well-being Programme as the life satisfaction measure of personal well-being for children.

The 2016 Good Childhood Report showed "a growing gap in happiness between girls and boys, with girls being particularly unhappy with their appearance". The Good Childhood Report 2017 found that fear of crime is the biggest worry for children and young people. In 2019, The Good Childhood Report reported that children's well-being had fallen to a 10-year low.

=== Campaigns ===
The Children's Society campaigns for changes to laws and policy that affect children.

For example, its work with young people on the streets culminated in a study in 1999, which called for a nationwide network of safe houses to be set up, and for statutory money to pay for them. This work also fed into a campaign to decriminalise prostitution for under-18s. The charity argued that child prostitution should be seen as a child protection issue, and that police and other agencies should protect children and young people from exploitation. In 1995, The Children's Society published the first report to highlight child prostitution in this way and the Association of Chief Police Officers and the Association of Directors of Social Services responded by making a public commitment to review the way they dealt with these children.

=== Christingle ===
Christingle services were popularised in the United Kingdom by John Pensom of the Children's Society. Since 1968 Christingle services have been held by churches and schools to raise funds for the society's work. £1.2m was raised in 2013 from over 5,000 events.

== Historic abuse scandal ==
In June 2017, prompted by scrutiny from the Independent Inquiry into Child Sexual Abuse (IICSA) into its past conduct, the Children's Society admitted to its role in historic child abuse. The charity was implicated in abuse arising from its role in facilitating the migration of 3700 children to Australia, Canada and Rhodesia (Zimbabwe). The charity also issued an apology for abuse carried out in its children's homes in the United Kingdom; "We also want to acknowledge that it's not only child migrants who suffered at the hands of abusers. We are also deeply sorry to any other people who in the past suffered neglect, harm or sexual abuse while in the care of The Children's Society here in the UK..."

The charity had been aware of the abuse for many years, and had paid damages in secret to victims, only admitting to these payments in 2017 following scrutiny from IICSA.
