= Michael Moynagh =

Michael Moynagh is a Church of England minister, missiologist and writer.

Moynagh is an academic in the Fresh Expressions stream of Anglican churchmanship, and acts as its director of Network Development and Consultant on Theology and Practice.

He is an associate tutor at Wycliffe Hall, Oxford, an Anglican training college. He is also a senior research fellow with Career Innovation.

== Ordained ministry ==
Moynagh was a curate at Emmanuel Church, Northwood, London before being appointed Priest-in-Charge at Wilton, Somerset.

During the late 1990s, as director for Third Millennium Studies at St John's College, Nottingham, he co-wrote a study on the future of society entitled Tomorrow. Also with Richard Worsley with whom he co-directed The Tomorrow Project, he later worked on Tomorrow's Workplace.

== Books ==
- Moynagh, Michael; Worsley, Richard (2008). Going Global. London: A&C Black.
- Moynagh, Michael; Harrold, Philip (2012). Church for Every Context: An Introduction to Theology and Practice. London: SCM Press. ISBN 9780334043690.
- Moynagh, Michael (2014). Being Church, Doing Life: Creating gospel communities where life happens. London: Monarch. ISBN 978-0857214935.
