= Diverse Church =

UK organization for young LGBTQ Christians

Diverse Church is a religious organization for young lesbian, gay, bisexual and transgender Christians in UK evangelical churches. It provides pastoral support for LGBT Christians who are members of churches who are not supportive of their sexual orientation or gender identity.

== History ==
Diverse Church was founded by Anglican priest Sally Hitchiner in 2013 as a pastoral resource for Christian young adults aged 18–30. It began as a confidential Facebook group for young Christians with families or churches which were non-supportive of their LGBT identity. It now produces video resources and hosts religious gatherings for young LGBT Christians. As of October 2015, Diverse Church had over 250 members.
