= Poem of the Right Angle =

Series of paintings and writings by Le Corbusier

Cover of the original work

The Poem of the Right Angle (Le poème de l'angle droit) is a series of 19 paintings and corresponding writings composed by the influential Swiss-French architect Le Corbusier between 1947 and 1953 and first published in book format as a limited edition of 250 copies in 1955. Aside from his seminal manifesto Toward an Architecture, The Poem of the Right Angle is considered to be his most lucid synthesis of personal maxims.

== Introduction ==
The Poem of the Right Angle was composed over a period of seven years, from 1947 to 1953. The paintings are arranged symmetrically in seven rows, or "zones" and read across, in order, 5, 3, 5, 1, 3, 1, 1 such that the entire composition appears top-heavy and cross-like. Corbusier referred to this organization as an iconostase, or iconostasis. Each zone, lettered A-G, is assigned a title and corresponding color. Le Corbusier was very interested in classic themes of alchemy, and each piece, as well as the significance of its placement in the color-coded sets, draws from and illuminates the dialectic of opposites inherent in alchemical processes.

== A. Milieu (Environment-Green) ==
Green is the alchemical symbol of the primal matter of the universe. Le Corbusier uses this zone as a taxonomy of natural cycles.

A.1. Representative of the cyclical nature of the sun

...the two rhythms
which regulate our destiny:
A sun rises
A sun sets
A sun rises again

A.2. Representative of the water cycle, an important part of alchemy and "a matrix for a dualistic universal confrontation."

      The level establishes where
      stops the descent of the waters
      to the sea
      the sea daughter of droplets
      and mother of vapors. And
      the horizontal defines
      the liquid content.

A.3. Introduces earth symbol, cardinal symbols, and man as procreator. It also is the first passage that directly references the right angle, here as a symbol of life, living and "uprightness".

      Upright on the terrestrial plateau
      of things perceptible to you
      contract with nature a pact of solidarity: it is the right angle
              Upright in front of the sea vertical
      there you are on your legs.

A.4. Uses figure-ground and heavy contrast to remark on the role of chaos in the divide between the conscious and unconscious

      The law of the meander is
      active in the thoughts and
      enterprises of men forming their
      ever renewing avatars
             But the trajectory gushes out
      from the mind and is projected by
      the clairvoyants beyond
      confusion

A.5. Very similar to the actual cover of the work, it is split down the middle and the clasped hands signal contradiction and reconciliation of opposites, which Corbusier stated were the only ways to ensure human survival. In a similar painting, the clasped hands symbolize the architect and the engineer working together.

      I have thoughts that two hands
      and their interlocking fingers
      express this right and
      this left unrelentingly
      unified and so necessary
      to reconciliation.
             The only possibility of survival
      offered to life

== B. Esprit (Spirit-Blue) ==
This zone represents the links between nature, architecture and the cosmos.

B.2. "Le Modulor" - Corbusier's Modular Man, an iconic illustration of proportion, is juxtaposed with a shell, which Corbusier regarded as an archetypal female form. The shell form also embodies the same proportional values as the Modulor, based on the Golden section.

      Its value is in
      this: the human body
      chosen as admissible
      support of numbers...
      .....Here is proportion!

B.3. This is an overly architectural frame. Floorplates and a foundation are clearly depicted, and an owl, a classic symbol of wisdom, is clearly visible in the foundation.

      Cleared of obstacles better
      that before the house of
      men mistress of his form
      takes up her abode in nature
             Complete in herself
      making her case on all grounds
      open to the four horizons

B.4. Another architectural frame which illuminates the concept of the brise soleil through the sun above and the "secret world" below.

      The clock and the solar
      calendar brought to
      architecture the "brise-soleil"
      installed in front of the windows of
      modern buildings

== C. Chair (Flesh-Violet) ==
Corbusier's tribute to the flesh consists of more complicated figures representing the animal world and all of its creative capacities.

C.1.

      Some oxen of burden pass
      every day in front of my window.
      Because of being designed and redesigned
      the ox - of pebble and of root
      becomes bull.

C.2.

      They are innumerable who
      sleep but others know
      to open the eye.
             Because the profound refuge is
      in the great cavern of
      sleep that other side of
      life in the night.

C.3. This is the centerpiece of the iconostase, which Corbusier dedicated to his wife.

      Tenderness!
      Shell the Sea has not ceased
      to throw us the wreckage of
      smiling harmony on the shores.
             Hand kneads hand caresses
      hand glides. The hand and the
      sea love one another.

C.4. The center line is quite overt, which may indicate that the image can also be recognized when turned 90°, a practice Le Corbusier was fond of.

      They are but
      half, giving to
      life only one half
             And the second part comes
      to them and fuses
      And good or bad comes to them
      the two
             who met!

C.5. The image of a woman's body with a unicorn's head is a motif that is also seen in the mural of Le Corbusier's Swiss Pavilion at the Paris University Campus (C.I.U.P.), as are 3 other plates from the Poeme.

      The galley sails
      The voices singing on board
      As all becomes strange
      and is transposed
      is transported high
      and is reflected on
      the plan of happiness

== D. Fusion (Red) ==
D.3.

      Do not overwhelm then he
      who wants to take his part of the
      risks of life - Let
      the metals fuse
      tolerate the alchemists who
      besides leave you outside
      the cause

== E. Caractère (Character-Clear) ==
The ascription of the "clear" color frames this zone, which represents light and will reborn in man.

E.2. The complex image of many women and a horse is achieved through phenomenal transparency and separation of color from line.

      The amazons are ready
      to leave to go to come back and
             to leave again and
      to fight combat always
      soldier.
      The amazons are young
      they do not grow old.

E.3. This is the most reproduced image from the series. The motif of the clasped hands seen in A.5. is repeated, along with a crescent face, indicative of the moon.

      Categorical
      right angle of the character
      of the spirit of the heart.
      I mirrored myself in this character
        and found myself
          found at home
            found
      Horizontal vision in front.

E.4. This image recalls some of Le Corbusier's paintings from the 1930s. It is orthogonal, architectural and labyrinthine.

      Will appear I sense it
      the splendor of brut concrete
      and the grandeur which it will
      have had to think the marriage
      of lines
             to weight the forms
             To weight...

== F. Offre (Offering-Yellow) ==
F.3. The symbol of the open hand appears as an "offering", and the interior lines and contours reveal traits and hidden characteristics.

      It is open since
      all is present available
      seizable
      Open to receive
      Open also in order that each
      comes there to take

== G. Outil (Tool-Purple) ==
G.3. The presentation of a "tool" is an analogy to the Philosopher's stone, both the solution and the question, thus establishing the cyclical nature of the work.

      one has
      with a piece of coal
      traced the right angle
             the sign
      It is the response and the guide
             the fact
             a response
             a choice
