= Wilson Carlile =

English Anglican evangelist (1847–1942)

Wilson Carlile CH
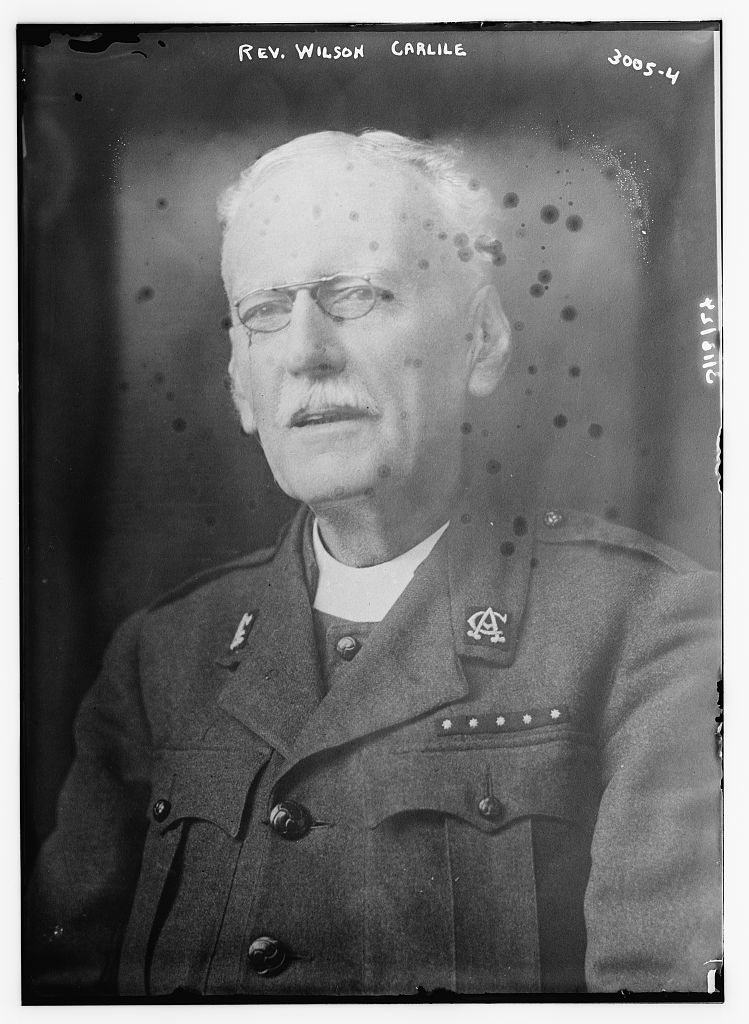
- Carlile, c. 1910–1915

Founder of the Church Army
- Born: 14 January 1847; Brixton, London, England
- Died: 26 September 1942 (aged 95); Woking, Surrey, England
- Honored in: Church of England
- Feast: 26 September

Wilson Carlile, CH (14 January 1847 – 26 September 1942) was a Christian, an English priest and evangelist who founded the Church Army. He was also a prebendary of St Paul's Cathedral, London. Known as "The Chief", Carlile inspired generations of evangelists.

== Early years ==
Carlile was born on 14 January 1847 in Brixton, London, UK. He was the eldest of a middle-class family of 12.

Before he was three, his mother found him on tiptoe trying to play the family piano. He persuaded his mother to help him learn some chords and from then on much of his time was spent on music.

Carlile suffered from a spinal weakness all his life which hampered his education. However, he learned French after being sent to school in France at age 14 and was proficient in German and Italian later in life.

Upon his return from France, he joined his grandfather's business firm. By age eighteen, owing to his grandfather's failing health, Carlile came to be mostly in control of the firm. By 1872, he was a successful young businessman and had made well over 20,000 pounds.

== From economic depression to rebirth ==
In 1873, an economic depression began and continued with a few breaks until 1896. It brought poverty and distress to working people, but also had effects on the business community. Carlile was among those affected by the depression as the prosperity which he had carefully built up suddenly failed. Mental strain led to a physical breakdown and for many weeks he was confined to his bed. It was during one of these bouts of poor health that he began to read W P Mackay's Grace and Truth. Later he would say:

I have seen the crucified and risen Lord as truly as if He had made Himself visible to my bodily sight. That is for me the conclusive evidence of His existence. He touched my heart, and old desires and hopes left it. In their place came the new thought that I might serve Him and His poor and suffering brethren.

After his physical recovery he went to work in his father’s firm. However, his real interest lay in religious work. He first joined the Plymouth Brethren who met at Blackfriars in London and worked among young people in that area. In 1875, the American evangelist Dwight L. Moody held his rallies in Islington, and Carlile offered his help. Ira Sankey, the musical director, recognised his musical ability and placed him at the harmonium where he accompanied the singing of the huge crowds who came to hear Moody. Following this mission, he went with Moody to Camberwell where he chose and trained the choir for the South London mission. Thus, he gained a solid understanding of the techniques of evangelism and the part that music can play.

== Theological education and early ministry ==
Through Moody’s example, Carlile became inspired to become an evangelist. He joined the Church of England and then decided to take holy orders. He was accepted by the London School of Divinity and after 18 months passed his examinations, having been ordained a deacon at St Paul's Cathedral in Lent 1880. Following this, he was accepted as a curate at St Mary Abbots, Kensington. Through his curacy, he wanted to reach people. Ordinary working people regarded the churches as "resorts of the well-to-do" (Charles Booth) and believed they would find no welcome within. Carlile wanted this to change and wanted to break down all barriers.

Since none of his efforts to bring ordinary people into his congregation worked, he decided to hold open-air meetings to attract passers-by. As time went on, he drew others to help him and people began gathering in such large numbers that the police told them to "move on." There were complaints and Carlile was told that his meetings would have to stop, but he was also encouraged to continue them elsewhere in a more appropriate spot.

== Church Army ==
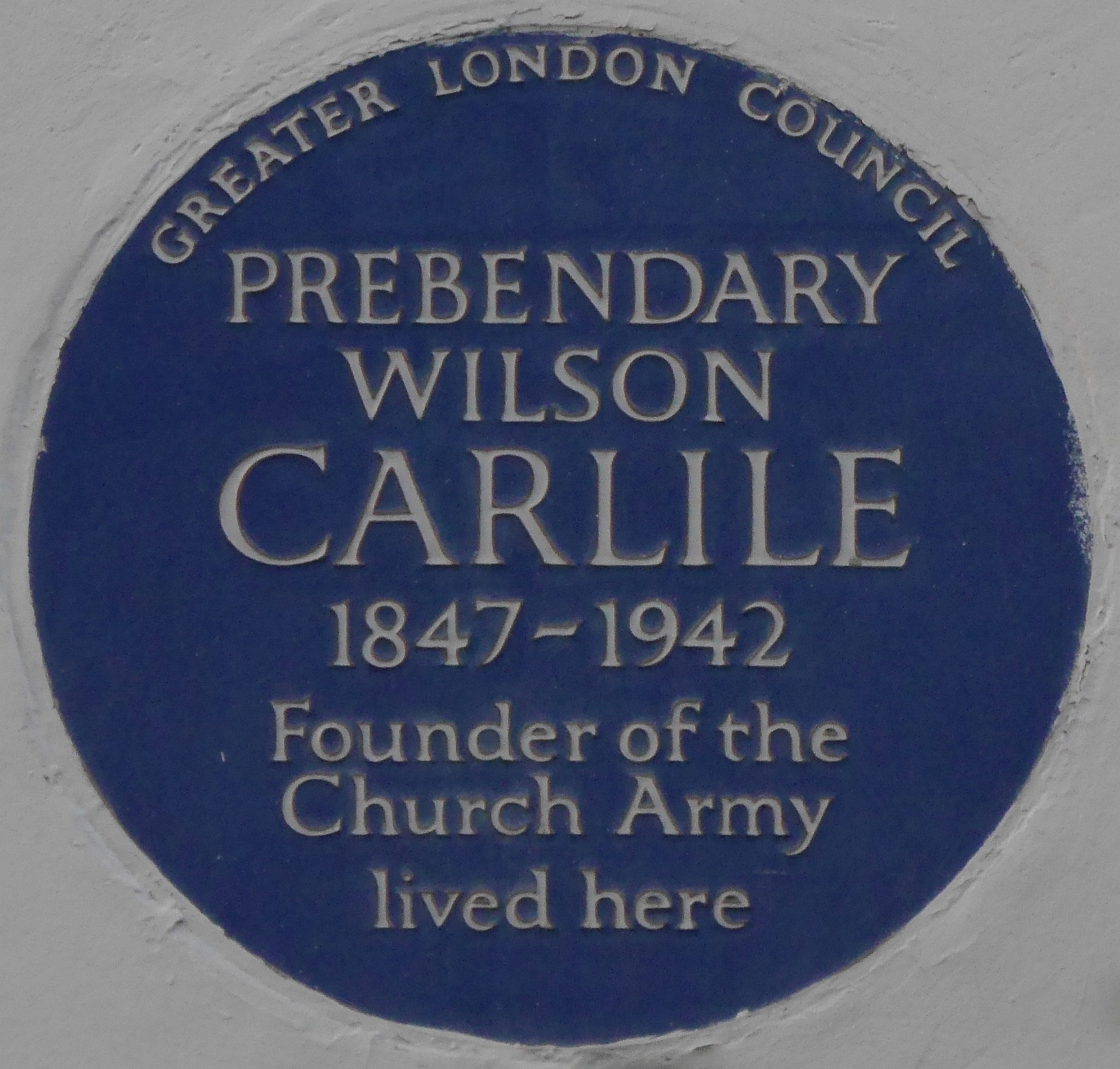
Blue plaque, 34 Sheffield Terrace, Kensington, London

Carlile resigned his curacy to devote his time to slum missions. His goal was to use the working person to help fellow workers, but to do so within the structure of the Church of England. Such work had already begun in a few other areas of England. Carlile wanted to co-ordinate all their efforts, so that trained evangelists could be sent to any parish where they were needed.

During this time, he visited the Salvation Army, where he received a "Soldier's Pass" which admitted him to private gatherings. He showed this on a train to his friend, F. S. Webster, the future rector of All Souls Church, Langham Place. Webster recalls, "I remember Mr Carlile explained that it was an Army and not a Church, that people could be banded together for purposes of evangelisation and soul-winning." Carlile began a "Church Salvation Army" in Kensington while Webster began one in Oxford. Bramwell Booth remembered Webster as "more than once walking in our processions, singing the praises of God though plastered with mud from head to foot."

It took time for the idea to catch hold, but in 1882 the Church Army was born. When asked, "Why 'Army?' ", Carlile's answer was that the evangelists intended to make war against sin and the devil. Also it was a time of wars - the Franco-German war and the First Boer War were not long over. It was a time of Army consciousness and discipline from above.

The first Church Army campaign was held in Belfast in 1883.

In his position as head of the Church Army, he remained authoritative, but he always recognised the higher authority of the Church of England. No work was carried out in any parish without the approval of the incumbent, nor in any prison or public institution unless the evangelists were invited by the chaplain.

Carlile met resistance in the early years but he persisted in trying to acquaint clerics and public officials in major cities with Church Army's aims, ideas and methods. In 1885, the Upper House of the Convocation of Canterbury passed a resolution of approval. With increasing support from a few bishops, the Army gradually gained the respect of the church. By 1925, the Church Army grew to become the largest home mission society in the Church of England and he was appointed a Member of the Order of the Companions of Honour (CH) in the 1926 New Year Honours.

Carlile ministered at St Mary-at-Hill in the City of London, in the late 19th/ early 20th century.

In his later years Carlile shared a house with his sister Marie Louise Carlile in Woking. He continued to take part in the administration of the Church army until his death in Woking on 26 September 1942. His ashes were interred at the foot of his memorial in St Paul's Cathedral.

== Family ==
Carlile was the eldest of a middle-class family of twelve children.

One of his brothers was Hildred Carlile, a Conservative Party politician.

His sister Marie-Louise Carlile (1861–1951) was heavily involved in the Church Army. Despite ill health, she started training women in 1888, and set up the first "Recue Shelter" for women in 1891. She continued in the mission for fifty years as leader of the Church Army Sisters.

In 1870, Carlile married Flora Vickers, with whom he had five sons.

One of his grandchildren, Edward Wilson Carlile, was General Secretary (1949–51), then Chief Secretary (1951–60) of the Church Army.

== Veneration ==
Wilson Carlile is remembered in the Church of England with a commemoration on 26 September (or the Sunday closest to the anniversary of his death).

== Remembrance ==
There is a historical blue plaque on the house where Wilson Carlile lived at No. 34 Sheffield Terrace, Holland Park, Kensington.

A homeless hostel for adult male ex-offenders in Manchester has been named after Wilson Carlile.

The current Sheffield head office of Church Army is based in its old training college for evangelists, and is named for Wilson Carlile.
