= Mary Grimes (charity worker) =

- Born: Mary Katharine Grimes; 26 September 1861; Funchal
- Died: 10 January 1921 (aged 59); Cape Town
- Occupations: librarian and charity worker
- Known for: promoting the emigration of children to the British colonies

Mary Katharine Grimes (26 September 1861 – 10 January 1921) was a British promoter of emigration. She was secretary of the Church Emigration Society and served on the emigration committee of the Waifs and Strays Society.

== Life ==
Grimes was born in Funchal on Madeira in 1861. Her grandfather was George Lund who was a doctor there. She was born to his daughter, Mary Ann, and her husband John Ralph Grimes. She was home schooled and she had two younger sisters.

She comes to notice as a volunteer who was the librarian and secretary of "Battersea Parochial Library". In 1885 she was in Wandsworth and Battersea where she volunteered as a visitor for the Metropolitan Association for Befriending Young Servants. She later continued this work in Lambeth until 1901.

In 1895 "Waifs and Strays" magazine described her as the epitome of their "type of female charity worker", because she was one of their "middle-aged unmarried ladies".

She became the secretary of the Church Emigration Society in 1901. The society would later be called the Church of England Council for Empire Settlement. She joined the Conservative party's women's suffrage association but she appears to have not been an active supporter. She supported the emigration committee of the Church of England Waifs and Strays Society which she joined in 1904. She was the secretary of the Church Emigration Society and she coordinated the society's work with clergy in Australia, Canada, South Africa and New Zealand. The Children's Society has apologised for its role in this work which included sending over 2,000 children to Canada between 1883 and 1915.

At the end of May 1910 she was at the Emigration Conference organised by the Royal Colonial Institute as honorary secretary of the Emigration Society. She spoke up about her knowledge of Australia - noting that they did not want to develop the poor as Britain had. Australia was rich in food and work and in her opinion emigrant women would prosper there.

Grimes was still working for the Emigration Society when she died on 10 January 1921 while visiting Cape Town. She was buried there the next day.
