= Fresh expression =

Form of church

Fresh Expressions is an international, cross-denominational movement within Christianity that seeks to develop new forms of church in collaboration with existing congregations. Its aim is to engage individuals who have never participated in church or who have left traditional church settings. Rather than focusing on conventional Sunday morning services, Fresh Expressions emphasizes forming faith communities in locations where people naturally gather within contemporary culture. According to the FX Denominational Partners (2006), "a Fresh Expression is a form of church for our changing culture established primarily for the benefit of people who are not yet members of any church".

== History ==
The Fresh Expressions movement began in the United Kingdom in 2004 following the release of the Mission Shaped Church report by the Church of England. The Church of England asked: "Why is church attendance declining, but God is still clearly at work in new ways?" This report, commissioned by the General Synod and initiated by Archbishop Rowan Williams, documented how churches and Christian communities had been developing alternative approaches to church life in response to societal shifts in the UK since the 1990s. Despite overall declines in church attendance, the report noted the emergence of "fresh expressions" of church that were engaging people in new ways. Archbishop Rowan Williams backed it, and that's how Fresh Expressions became an official movement. It also offered recommendations to support the continued development of these alternative forms of church.

The initiative was established as a partnership between the Church of England and the Methodist Church, with leadership from Bishop Steven Croft and Reverend Peter Pillinger. It started as Anglican/ Methodist but went cross-denominational very fast because the problem wasn't unique to the UK or to one denomination. Over time, the partnership expanded to include other Christian traditions and organizations, including the Church of Scotland, the United Reformed Church, the United Methodist Church, and Baptists Together. Fresh Expressions now collaborates with denominations, regional church bodies, congregations, and ministry leaders to provide vision and training for the development of new faith communities.

Today, Fresh Expressions works with denominations, regional church bodies, individual congregations, and ministry leaders to provide vision and actionable training. The movement has spawned thousands of new faith communities and has taken root in Australia, Austria, Canada, Germany, Netherlands, Norway, South Africa, Sweden, Switzerland, and the United States of America. It is now an international, cross-denominational movement focused on reaching people who are not yet members of any church.

According to George Lings in Day of Small Things, Fresh Expressions represents a significant contribution to ecclesial innovation within the Church of England.

== Fresh expression values ==
Fresh expressions can take a variety of forms, but several defining characteristics help distinguish them as part of the movement. These include being missional, contextual, ecclesial, and formational.

=== Missional ===
Fresh expressions are designed to engage individuals who do not currently attend church. The goal is to reach out and not intended to be extensions of existing church programs or gathering existing Christians, but rather new forms of church that emerge in collaboration with people outside traditional church structures.

=== Contextual ===
Each fresh expression is developed within and shaped by the specific cultural and social context of the community it serves. It seeks to communicate Christianity in ways that are meaningful and relevant to the particular group it engages. These communities may form in diverse settings and in various environments such as public spaces, housing developments, or university campuses. Some are tailored to specific populations, including bikers, artists, or people experiencing homelessness.

=== Ecclesial ===
Fresh expressions aim to function as church for those they reach, rather than as ministries of an existing church. While they may be connected to established churches or denominations, their intention is to form autonomous worshiping communities that are recognized as valid expressions of church. It includes worship, Scripture, prayer, community and pastoral care, not just an event.

=== Formational ===
Fresh expressions are committed to the spiritual formation and discipleship of their members. Although the methods and expressions of discipleship may differ depending on the context, the goal remains to nurture individuals in their growth as Christians.

== Development in the United States ==
The Fresh Expressions movement began gaining traction in the United States during the 2010s through partnerships with mainline Protestant denominations, church planting networks, and missional leaders seeking new forms of Christian community in response to declining participation in traditional congregations. Among the denominations most closely associated with the movement in the United States is The United Methodist Church, which formally developed a national initiative known as Fresh Expressions UM (Fresh Expressions United Methodist).

Fresh Expressions UM emerged through collaboration between denominational agencies, bishops, clergy, and lay leaders who sought to adapt the principles of the original United Kingdom movement to the cultural and ecclesial realities of the United States. The initiative emphasizes a “blended ecology” [] of church in which inherited congregations and new contextual faith communities coexist and mutually strengthen one another. Through conferences, coaching networks, online training programs, and local experimentation, Fresh Expressions UM has helped establish hundreds of new Christian communities in settings such as coffee shops, recovery centers, apartment complexes, dog parks, tattoo parlors, breweries, dinner churches, and community service environments.

One of the most visible figures in the development and contextualization of Fresh Expressions in the United States has been Michael Beck, a United Methodist pastor, sociologist, and denominational leader. Beck has written extensively on Fresh Expressions, blended ecology, and contextual ministry, authoring numerous books and training resources that helped popularize the movement within American Methodism and other denominational contexts. Through initiatives in Florida and nationally, Beck and other leaders contributed to the expansion of Fresh Expressions through coaching systems, pilot projects, seminary partnerships, and leadership training programs.

In the United States, Fresh Expressions has often been connected to broader conversations about post-Christendom ministry, church revitalization, missional ecclesiology, and community engagement. The movement has been especially influential within communities exploring alternative forms of discipleship, lay-led ministry, recovery ministry, neighborhood-based mission, and bi-vocational or decentralized models of church leadership.

== Criticism ==
Canon Dr. John Dunnill of St George's Cathedral, Perth says that a Fresh Expressions project can sometimes be more about form than substance. Alison Milbank has argued that aiming to be independent congregations in this way undermines existing authority structures within the parish system. Andrew Davison and Milbank further criticised Fresh Expressions from a broadly Anglo-Catholic perspective for separating themselves from geographical parishes, holding to a weak ecclesiology, abandoning liturgical services, and promoting 'choice-led individualism' over Anglican traditions.

There is some debate as to how to measure success for a fresh expression. The three (or four) selfs offer a useful lens by which to measure governance, finance, and reproducibility, but say little about the underlying health of the mission or discipleship of the church. Michael Moynagh recommends the four 'f's of fruit (is the community deepening in their faith?), flow (are members who move on being helped into another form of Christian community?), family (is the church connected to denominational or group networks?), and freedom (does the church have appropriate levels of independence in decision making?). Andrew Dunlop prefers a more theological approach to success, taking account of the action of God in the life of the church community and in the lives of individuals.
