= Shuffrey =

Shuffrey is a surname. Notable people with the surname include:

- James Allen Shuffrey (1858–1939), British watercolour artist
- Leonard Shuffrey (1852–1926), British architect and architectural designer
- Paul Shuffrey (1889–1955), British colonial administrator, editor and publisher
