= St Peter's Church, Ealing =

Church in Ealing, London, United Kingdom

Coordinates: 51.52229°N 0.30439°W

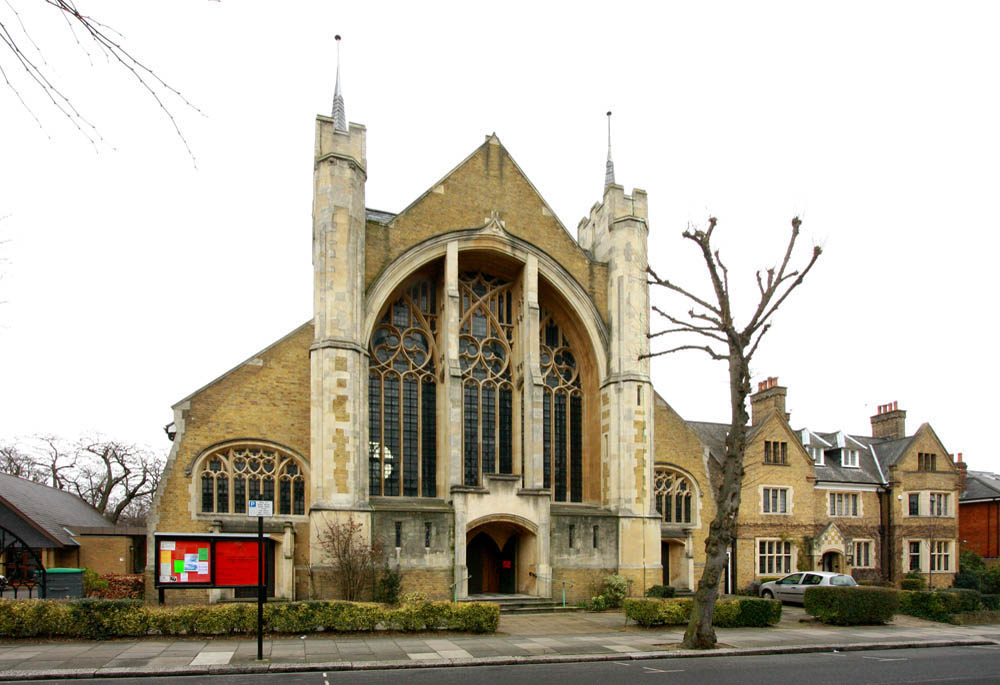
St Peter's Church, view from Mount Park road

St Peter's Church, Ealing, is an Anglican parish church in Mount Park Road, North Ealing, in the Diocese of London, regarded by Sir John Betjeman as an example of a Victorian-built church "of which we can be proud". Held to be one of the premier architectural works in Ealing, the Grade II* Listed building is noted for its combination of Arts & Crafts and late-Victorian Gothic as well as its west front and great west window. In addition to Sunday and weekday services, the church and adjacent hall serve as a hub for various community activities and events.

== Heritage ==
Notable for its unusual fusion of free Gothic style used in a highly original manner, St Peter’s occupies no small place in the last great age of church building

— Sir Roy Strong

St Peter's was built as mission church of Christ the Saviour Church, Ealing. The Rector of Christ the Saviour raised funds for four daughter churches; St John's Church, Ealing, St Stephen's Church, Ealing, St Saviour's Church, Ealing, and St Peter's.

The land for the church was donated by John Clark Record. Replacing an iron church which had stood on the site for 10 years, St Peter's was built between 1892 and 1893 to accommodate the growing suburb of North Ealing. The original iron church had been dedicated to St Andrew and it was originally proposed to give the same name to the new church. However, when the Presbyterians started to build in Mount Park Road in 1889, the vestry felt that "this Church should set the example of giving way in face of a threatened dispute about the Saint's name' and with commendable tact abandoned the 'Scottish' saint in favour of St Peter."

The new building was designed by John Dando Sedding, the architect of Holy Trinity, Sloane Street, but following Sedding's death it was built under the direction of his pupil and successor in practice, the noted designer and architect Henry Wilson. The foundation stone was laid in 1893 by Princess Helena, Queen Victoria's third daughter. The building was consecrated the same year by Frederick Temple, Bishop of London and later Archbishop of Canterbury. Wilson created the brass panels on the inside of the main doors, worked with flowing patterns. This decoration was accompanied by the bronze figure of an angel by F. W. Pomeroy, a feature which is now lost.

Sedding's plans for the church were complimented by The Builder magazine as "a piece of real originality in design, which is refreshing to come across after seeing so many repetitions of old forms, Classic and Gothic". Pevsner notes the "admirable use of Gothic forms – especially the curvaceous forms of late Gothic – to produce a building of great originality".

The church was added to extensively throughout the first quarter of the 20th century. In 1911, two doorways were created at the west end of each aisle, and in 1913 the Lady Chapel was built on the south side of the chancel. The north transept tower intended by Sedding was never built.

A notable feature of the building, the west front, has two small turrets on either side of large the recessed west window, which is unusually large with fine composite tracery. The exterior of the building is also of note on account of the long steep nave roof with shallow chains of arches connecting small turrets.

Inside, much of the intended ornamentation was never completed. However, the building's substantial four-bay nave with Gothic triforium, allied with the clear glass of the windows and the lack of ornamentation, make the church unusually light and spacious. Singular features include the in 1913, and the inner west doors, with decorative Art Nouveau metalwork by Wilson.

For several decades, until his death in 1926, the architect and architectural designer Leonard Shuffrey, was a member of the Church and contributed to its beautification. Shuffrey designed the font (executed by Messers Blackler of Torquay and dedicated in 1911) as well as the decoration of the alabaster high altar table. In 1896 a visit was paid to the newly completed St Peter's by the members of the Architectural Association, who afterwards received tea at Thorncote, Shuffrey's new Queen Anne style house on Edgehill Road. Shuffrey's son, Gilbert Shuffrey, was killed at the Battle of Gallipoli and is memorialised in St Peter's Lady Chapel and on the Ealing Town Memorial, the later designed by his father. Shuffrey's brother, James Allen Shuffrey, was a notable watercolour artist.

Despite a scheme of stained glass being designed for the whole church, only the six (including two in what is now an office) were ever completed. It was designed by Walter Tower of Kempe and Co.

=== The Great War & the Lady Chapel ===
A Lady Chapel was built in 1913. Between 1921 and 1928, the chapel was decorated as a war memorial. The scheme was let by the xicar, Bertram Kite, and his wife, as a memorial to their son Ralph Bertram Kite, who died fighting in Northern France, and to the fallen of the wider community. In 1921 an oak reredos by Cecil Greenwood Hare and brass memorial plaque were installed. Altar rails were donated by the social campaigner Isabella Holmes and her husband Basil, in memory of their son Wilfred Holmes.

Seven years later the scheme was completed with the decoration of the ceiling and a new screen between the Chapel and main Church. The work also included the addition fine wall paintings of the Annunciation angels over the reredos in the Lady Chapel, executed by watercolour artist Henry Charles Brewer. Brewer created the paintings on canvass at his studio in Acton. A practicing Catholic, it the paintings are his only known church decoration work. The face of Brewer's painted Angel Gabriel is thought to be based on that of his brother James Alphege Brewer, the notable creator of etchings. An etching by James Alphege Brewer donated in 2022 by a descendant of the Brewer family hangs in the Chapel. The chapel was conserved and restored in 2022.

In the south aisle is a painting by late Pre-Raphaelite Edward Arthur Fellowes Prynne of 'Christ before Pilate'. Prynne was the brother the architect George Fellowes Prynne and lived in the parish. The picture was given to the church by Prynne's widow following his death in 1921. Executed in 1898 in the artist's studio in the garden of his house at 1 Woodville Road, the picture is presumed to be the painting of the same name which Fellowes Prynne exhibited at the Dusseldorf Exhibition of Religious Art.

== Community ==
St Peter's holds services on Sunday mornings and throughout the week in addition to major services at Easter and Christmas. It runs a local walking group, hosts the Ealing Churches Winter Night Shelter and an organ recital series. St Peter's also holds an Amnesty letter writing group, book club, junior church and Sunday choir. The church is also used by local schools for concerts and carol services.

== Clergy ==
Vicars

- 1894–1909: William Petty
- 1909–1916: Henry Austin Thompson. Thompson later became Vicar of St Peter's Eaton Square, where he was killed by enemy action in 1941.
- 1916–1939: Joseph Bertram Kite. Kite was formerly Dean of St David's Cathedral, Hobart, in Tasmania from 1897 to 1916.
- 1939–1946: Frank Challoner Pond
- 1946–1953: George Maurice Bosworth
- 1953–1963: Henry Cooper
- 1963–1971: Derek Tyrie
- 1972–1974: John David Wheeler
- 1974–1981: Charles Gilbert Francis Dare
- 1982–1991: Richard Hayes
- 1991–2000: William Taylor. Taylor was later Dean of Portsmouth Cathedral and is now Vicar of St John's Notting Hill.
- 2000–2011: Mark Powell. Powell is currently Canon Steward of St George's Chapel, Windsor Castle.
- 2012–present: David Neno

Other notable former clergy

- Morris Maddocks was a curate of the church in the 1950s and was later Assistant Bishop of Bath and Wells. While at St Peter's he married Anne Maddocks, Assistant Organist of Chichester Cathedral.
- Michael Tavinor, Dean of Hereford Cathedral until 2021, was a curate at St Peter's between 1982 and 1985.

== Connections ==
- Kenneth Allsop, British broadcaster, author and naturalist, was married at St Peter's in March 1942.
- The funeral of Henry Austin Dobson, poet and essayist, was held at St Peter's on 6 September 1921.
- General Sir Anthony Farrar-Hockley, distinguished British soldier and military historian, was married in St Peter's on 7 July 1945.
- Emmanuel Phillips Fox, Australian artist, married Ethel Carrick at St Peter's on 9 May 1905.
- Harry George Hawker, Australian aviation pioneer, married Muriel Alice Peaty at St Peter's on 14 November 1917.
- Isabella Holmes was a well known social reformer and expert on London's burial grounds. St Peter's Lady Chapel alter rails were given by Holmes and husband Basil Holmes, a local Councillor in Ealing, in memory of their son Wilfred, killed in 1913. Isabella Holmes was the daughter of chemist John Hall Gladstone and half sister of Margaret Ethel MacDonald, wife of Prime Minister Ramsay Macdonald.
- Sir Stephen Holmes was the son of Isabella Holmes and Basil Holmes. He was appointed High Commissioner to Australia for the United Kingdom between 1952 and 1956.
- Paul Shuffrey son of Leonard Shuffrey's attended St Peter's as a child. He became Editor of the Guardian and the Church Quarterly Review.

== Gallery ==
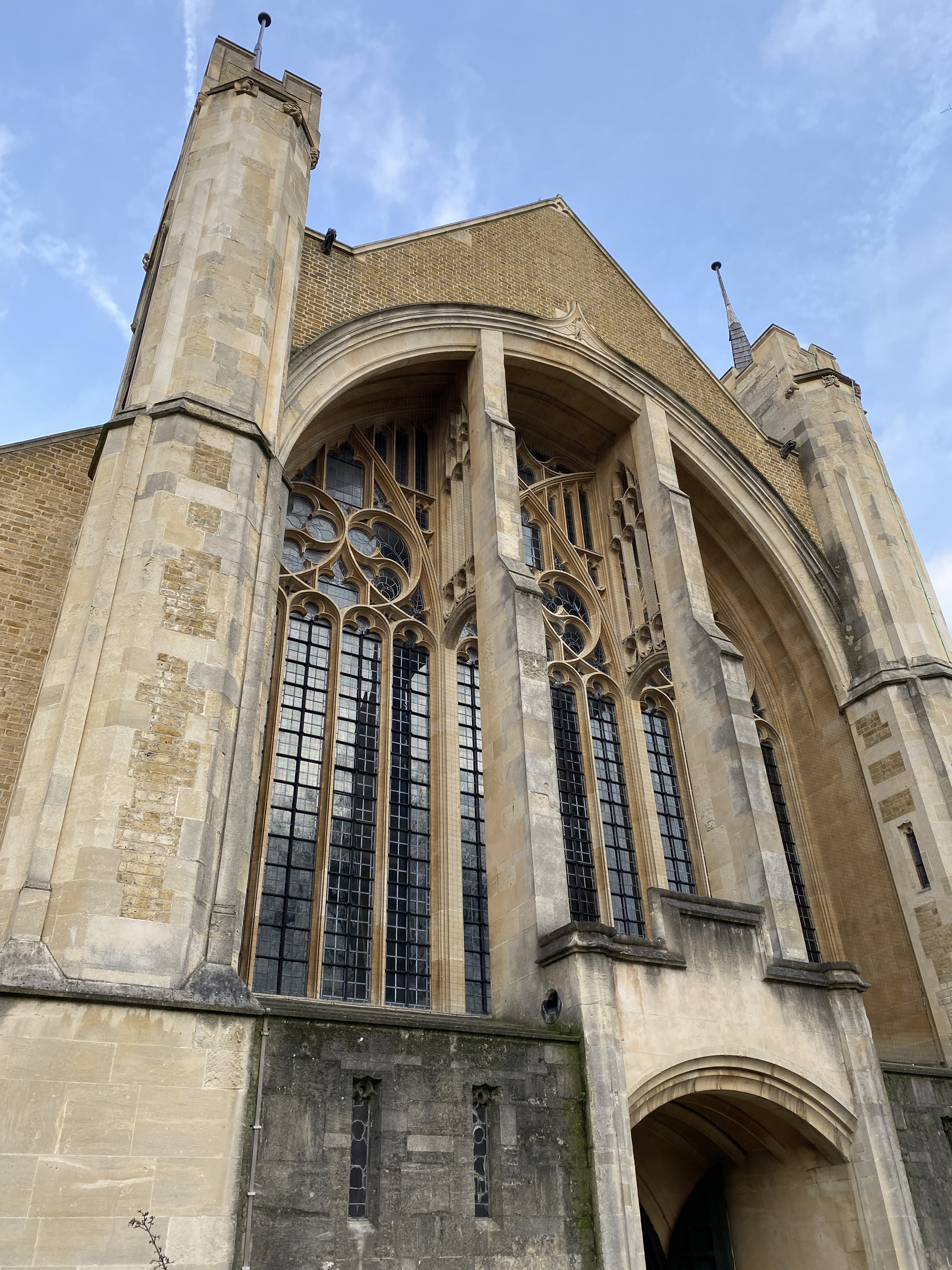
The west front of St Peter's Church, Ealing

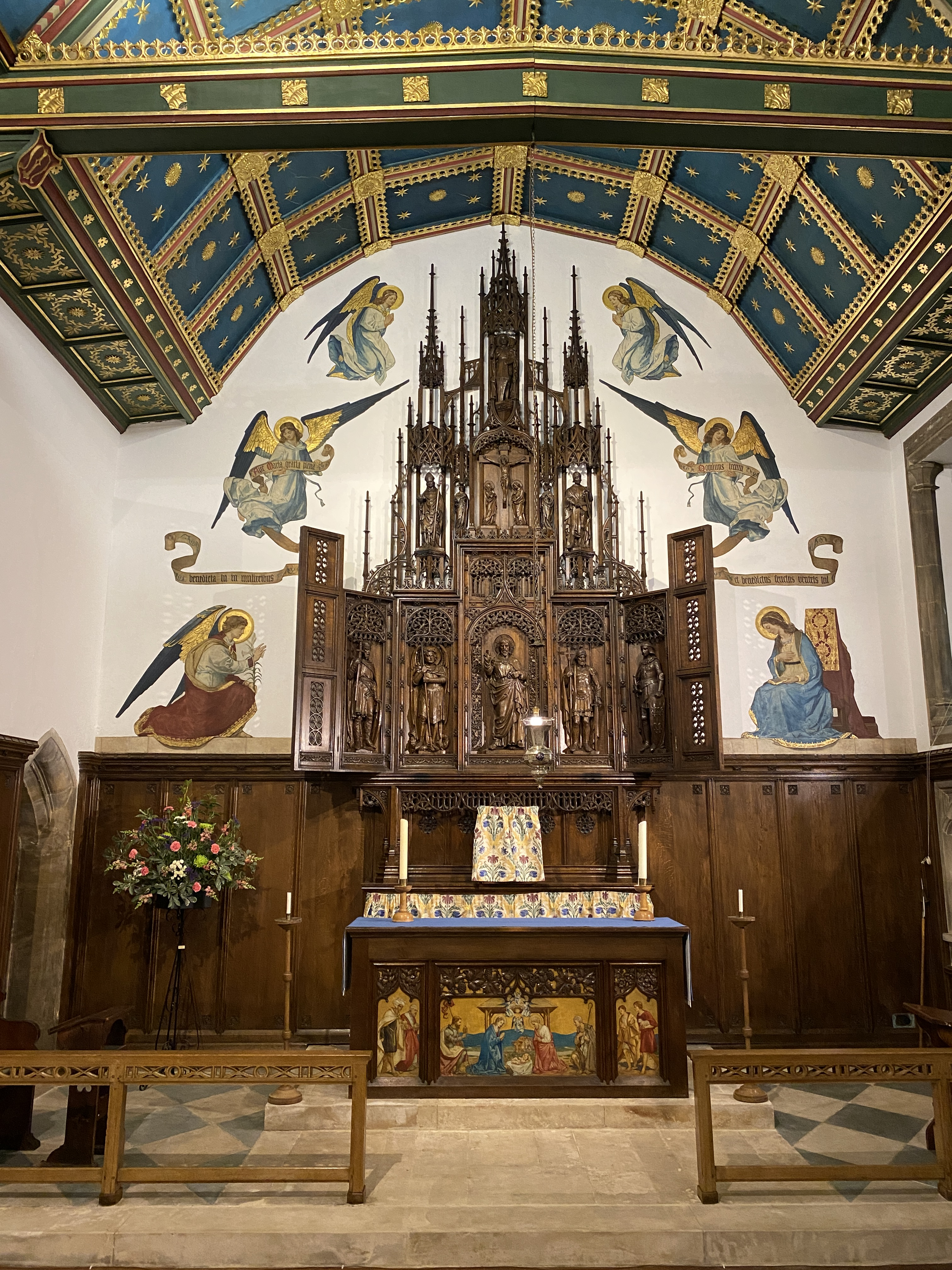
The Lady Chapel at St Peter's Church, Ealing, restored in 2022

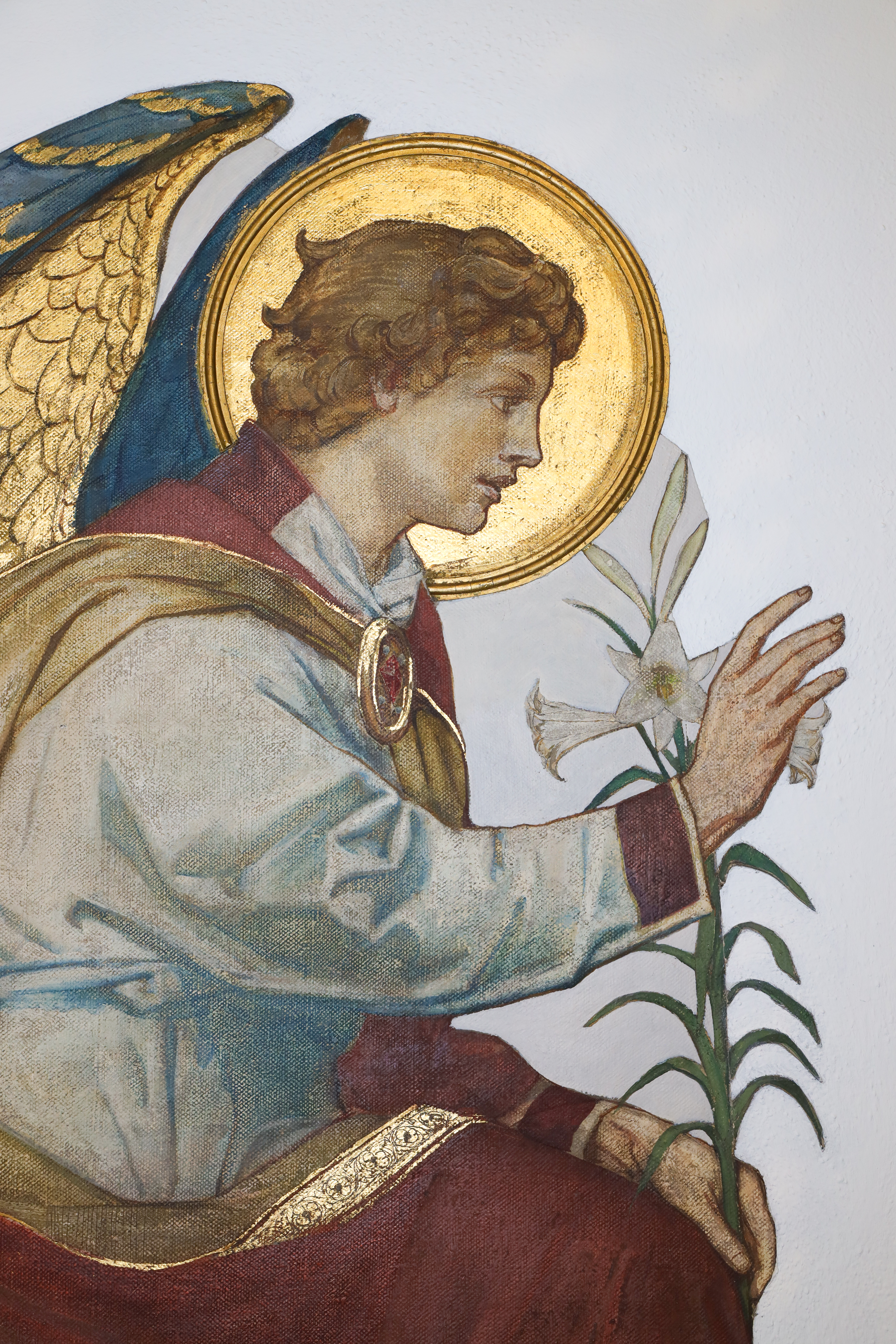
Lady Chapel Wall Painting of the Angel Gabriel St Peter's Church, Ealing by Henry Charles Brewer

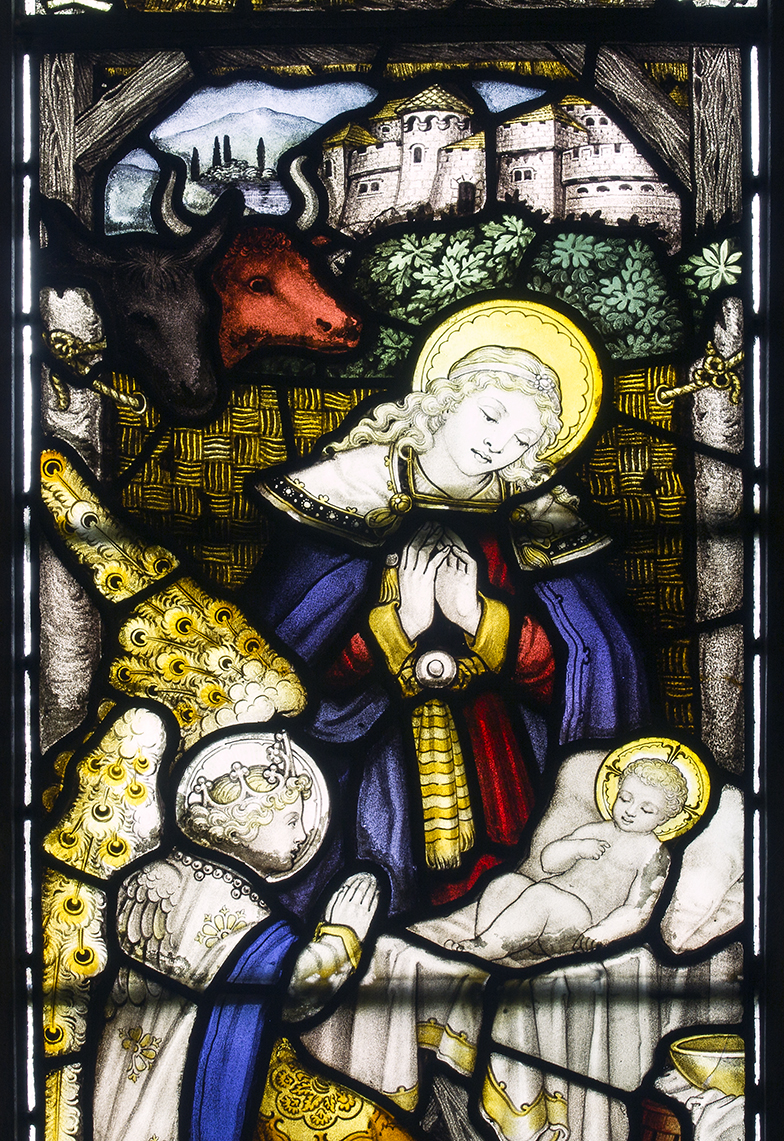
Kempe and Co Stained glass at St Peter's Church, Ealing

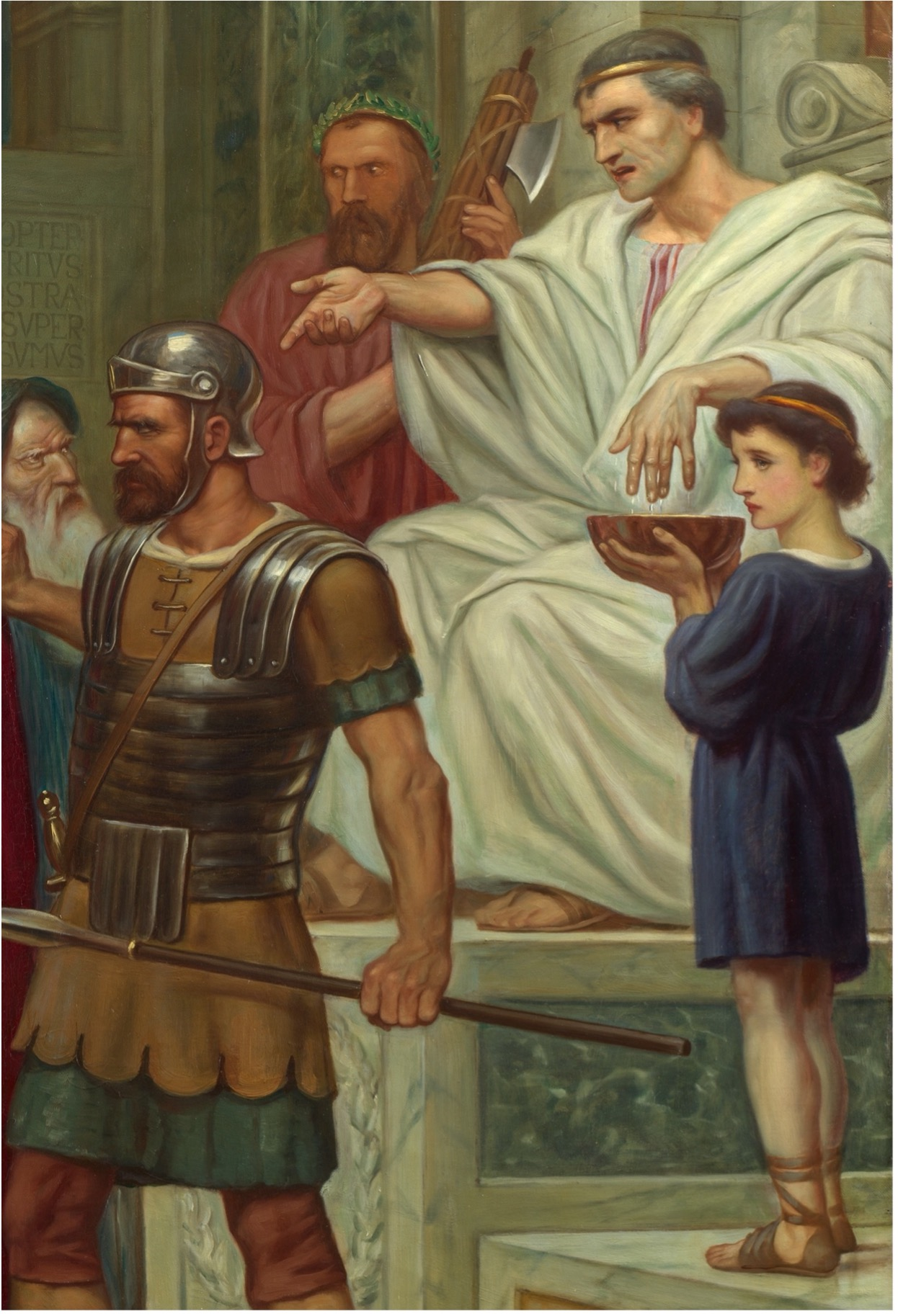
Detail from Edward Arthur Fellowes Prynne's painting Christ Before Pilate' at St Peter's Church, Ealing

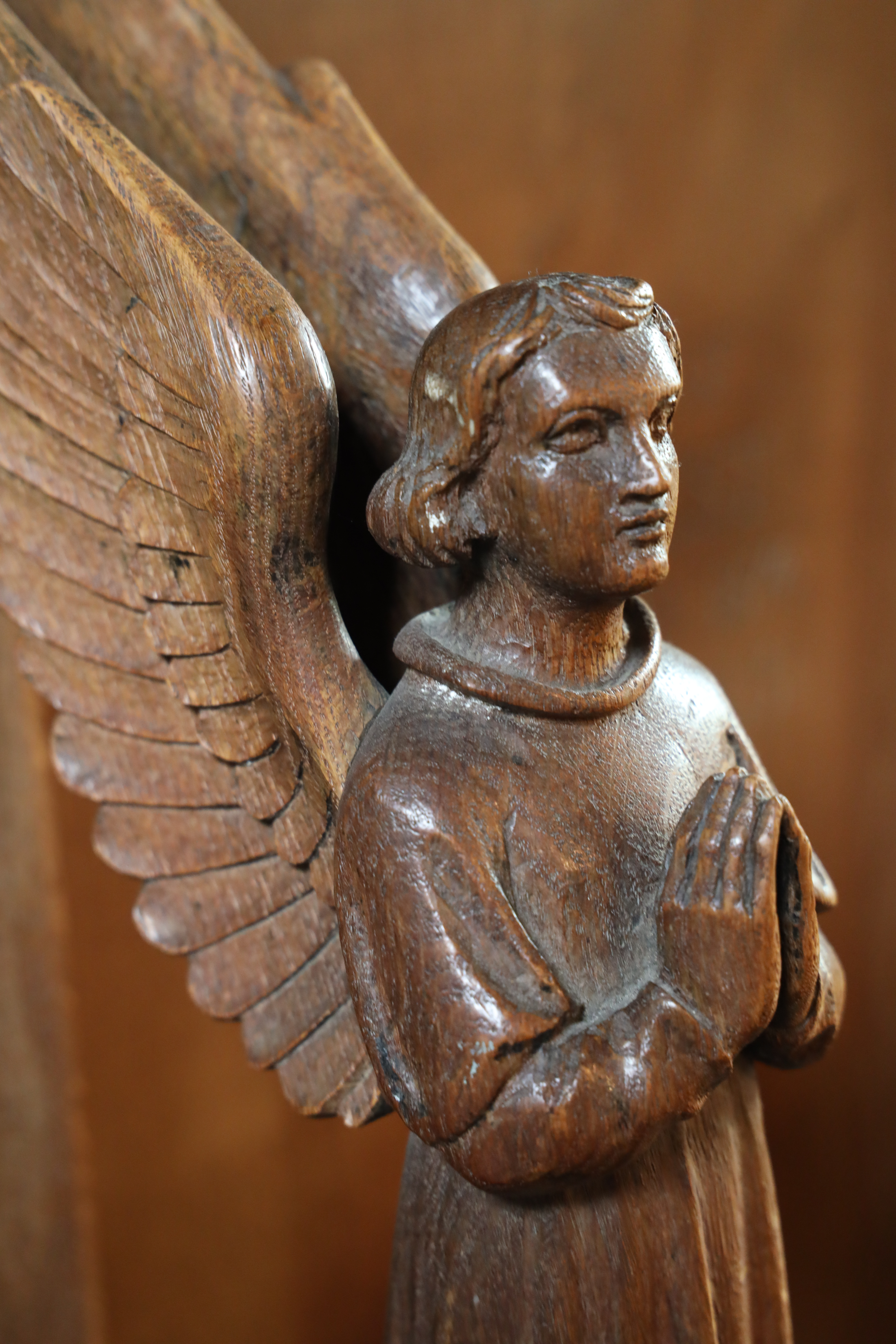
Choir stall carving by Cecil Greenwood Hare at St Peter's Church, Ealing

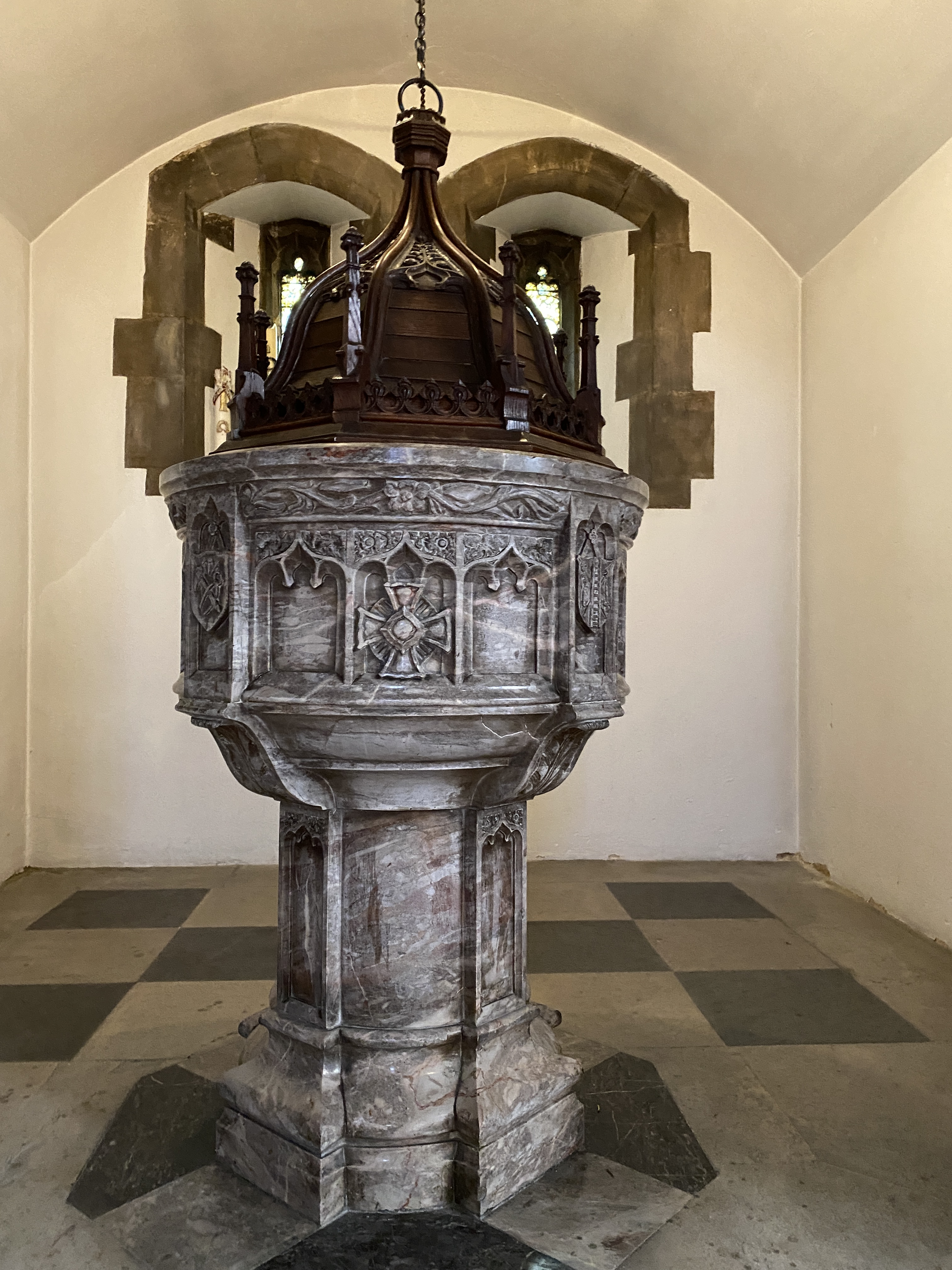
Font designed by Leonard Shuffrey at St Peter's Church, Ealing
