= Lublinski =

Lublinski, Russian feminine: Lublinskaya is a Russian surname, of Ashkenazi Jewish origin literally meaning "one from Lublin". The Polish-language equivalent is Lubelski, occasionally Lubliński. Notable people with the surname include:

- Alexandra Lublinskaya, Soviet historian
- David Lublinski, British artist
- Samuel Lublinski, Berlin-based writer, literary historian, critic, and philosopher of religion

== See also ==
- Lubinski
