= Lubelski =

Lubelski, feminine: Lubelska is a Polish toponymic surname literally meaning "from Lublin". Notable people with the surname include:

- Mieczysław Lubelski (1886–1965), Polish monumental sculptor and ceramicist
- Nava Lubelski (born 1960), American contemporary artist
- Samara Lubelski, American singer, violinist, guitarist and bassist
- Tadeusz Lubelski (born 1949), Polish film historian, theorist and critic

== See also ==
- Lublinski
