= Holy Trinity Church, Wood Green =

Grade II listed church in Oxfordshire, England

Coordinates: 51.7920°N 1.4792°W

Holy Trinity Church, Wood Green, is a Grade II listed Victorian church in Witney, Oxfordshire.

The Church was built in 1848–9, on land given by the bishop of Winchester and the duke of Marlborough; the cost was met largely from subscriptions, and a gift from the rector Charles Jerram. The architect was Benjamin Ferrey.

The church of squared and coursed limestone with ashlar quoins and dressings and a gabled stone slate roof. There is a two-bay chancel with pointed moulded doorway and Caernarvon-arched window. The five-bay nave has offset buttresses, lancets and two-light windows in each east bay.

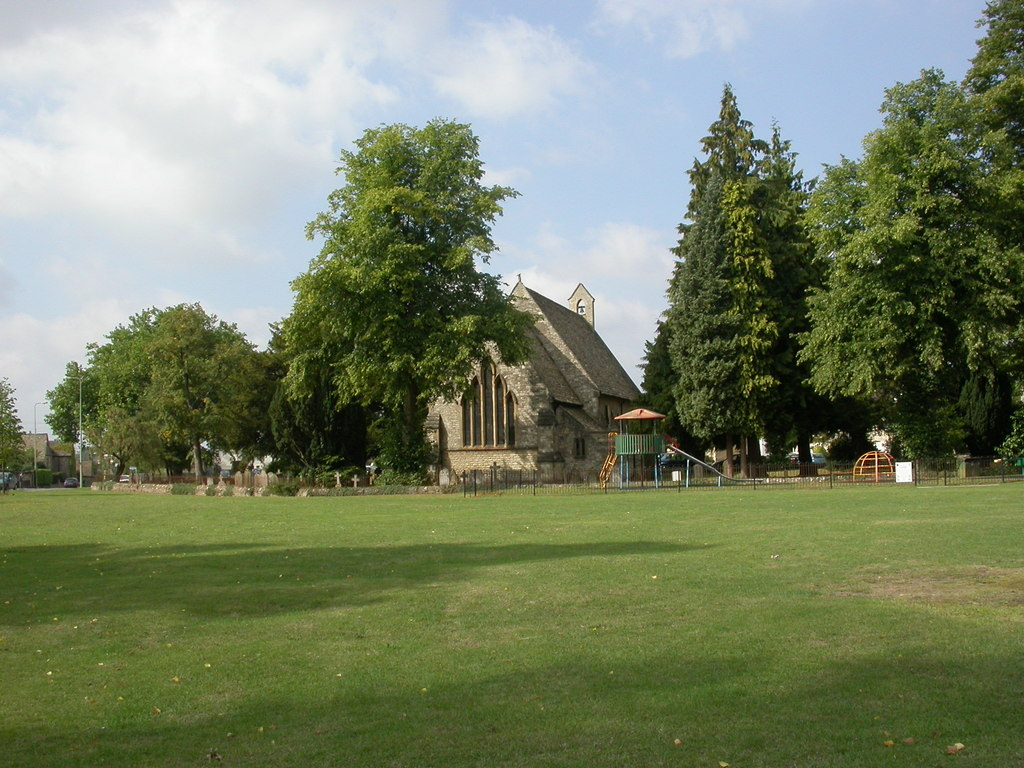
Witney, Holy Trinity - geograph.org.uk - 2017065.jpg

An organ was installed in 1860, and new choir stalls and altar rails were fitted in 1869. In 1887 the vestry was enlarged to designs by Clapton Crabb Rolfe, and in 1895 an organ by Charles Martin of Oxford replaced the earlier one.

A new pulpit was fitted in 1909 in memory of Samuel and Mary Shuffrey. It was created in the Wood Green workshop of their son Leonard Shuffrey, the leading architect and architectural designer, who is buried in the Churchyard. James Allen Shuffrey, the notable watercolour artist, and brother of Leonard Shuffrey, sang in Wood Green Church Choir as a boy.
