= Banister Fletcher (architect, born 1833) =

19th-century British architect

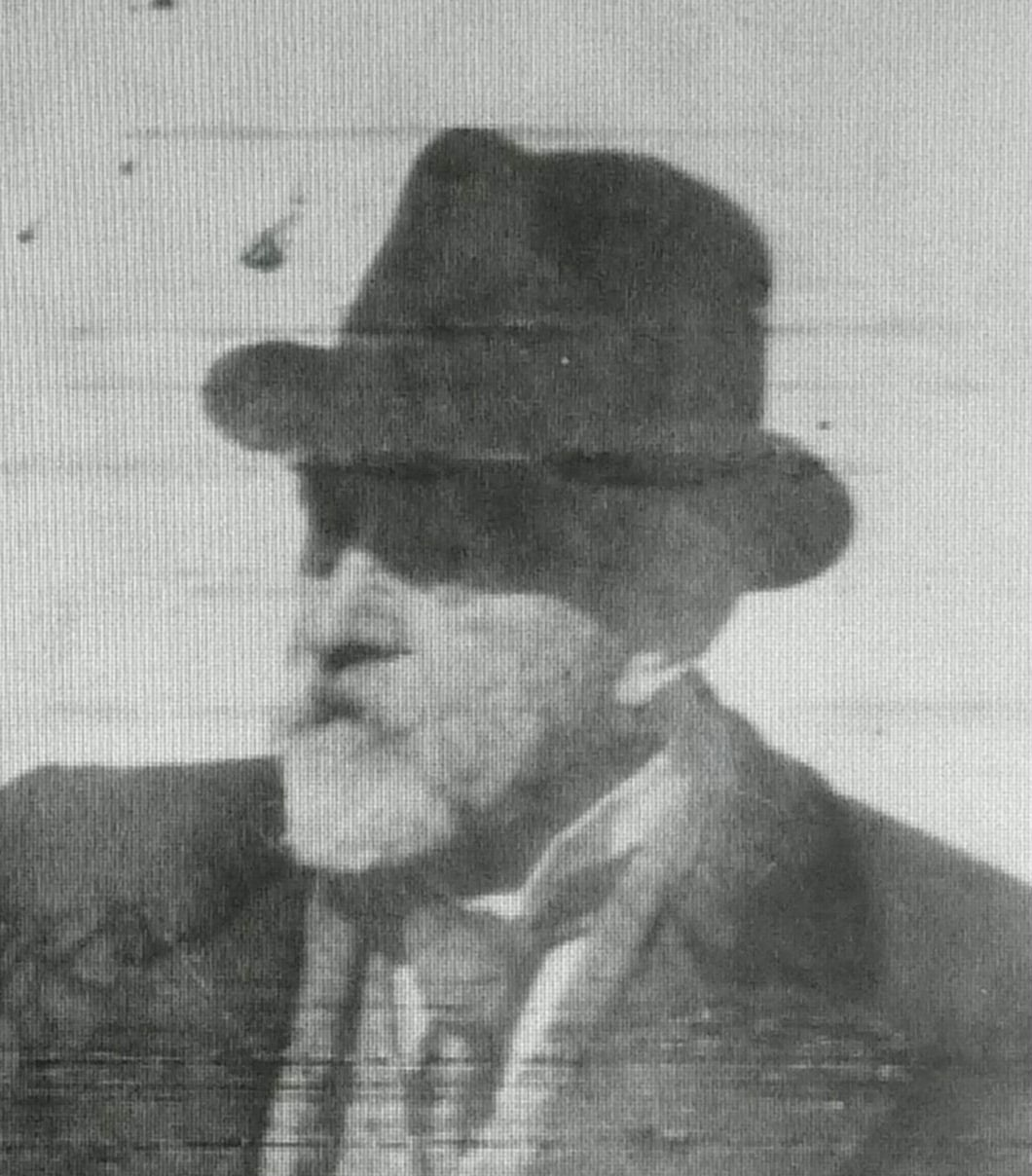
Banister Fletcher, in 1898

Banister Fletcher (11 August 1833 – 5 July 1899) was an English architect and surveyor and Liberal politician who sat in the House of Commons from 1885 to 1886. He was extremely hardworking, and a prolific author besides many other interests. He is mainly remembered for A History of Architecture on the Comparative Method (1895), written with his son Sir Banister Fletcher, which remains in print.

== Career ==
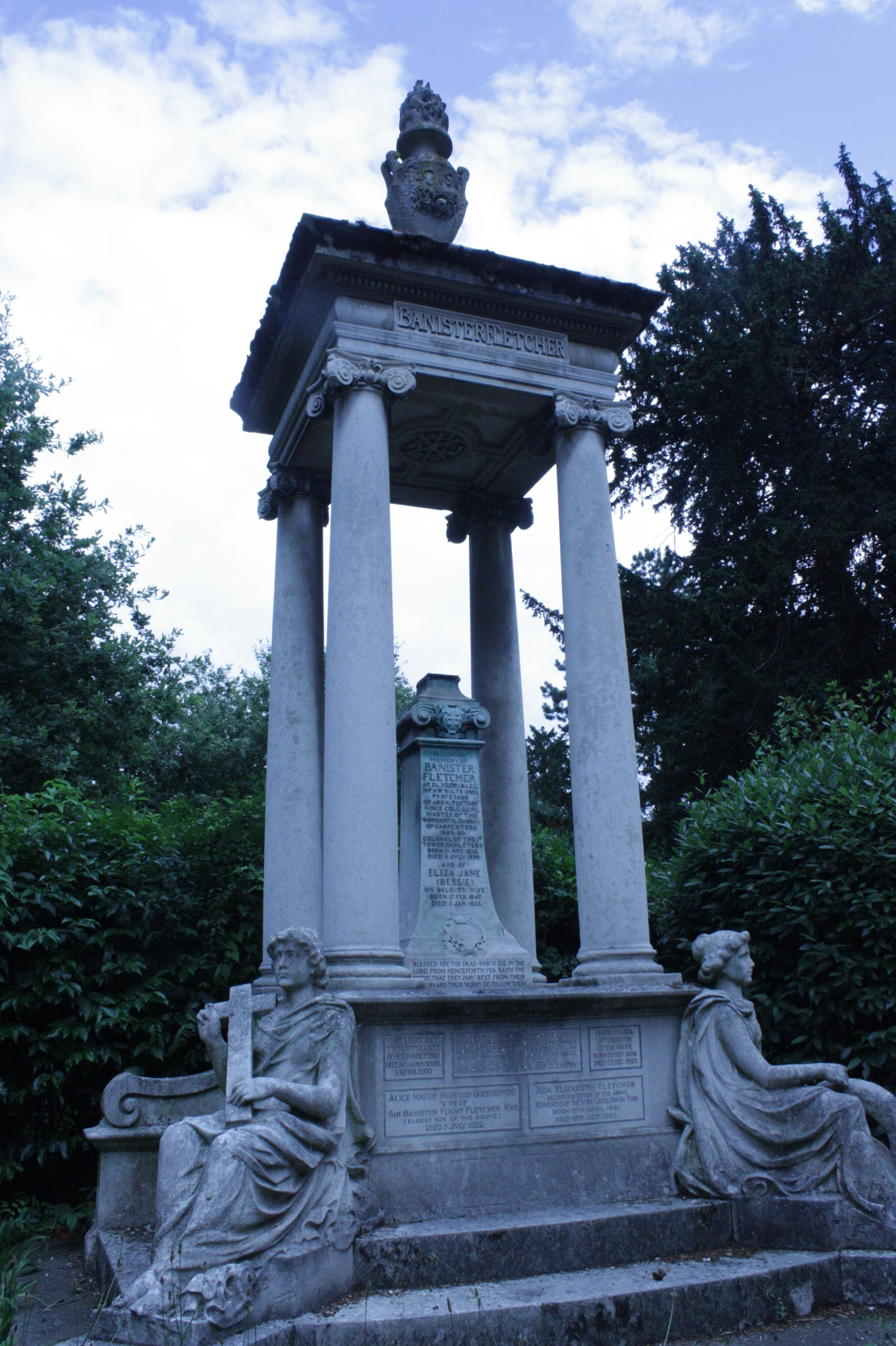
Banister Fletcher's tomb in West Hampstead Cemetery

Fletcher was the second son of Thomas Fletcher. He was educated privately and while a student he won the 1st prize given by the Institute of Architects in London. He became an architect and surveyor, and was based in Newcastle-upon-Tyne, designing industrial buildings, until he moved to London in about 1870. He published Model Houses for the Industrial Classes the following year, the first of many books, several of which were handbooks for architects, surveyors, and the building trade. From 1875 he was district surveyor for West Newington and part of Lambeth. He was also a major in the 1st Tower Hamlets Rifle Volunteer Brigade. Fletcher became a Fellow of the RIBA and was the author of several architectural text-books.

A number of architects began their careers with Banister Fletcher, including Leonard Shuffrey, who worked for the firm from 1870 to 1880.

Fletcher was elected as a Liberal Member of Parliament for Chippenham on 24 November 1885, making his maiden speech the following year on the topic of excise duties on herb beer. The following election cut short his parliamentary career, and he was defeated on 1 July 1886 by Lord Henry Bruce, a Conservative. Fletcher made five speeches during the time he was in parliament. At the 1892 General Election he made an unsuccessful attempt at a return to parliament as Liberal candidate at Christchurch.

From 1890, Fletcher was Professor of Architecture at King's College, London. He was also Master of the Worshipful Company of Carpenters from 1889 to 1890, which developed from his interest in designing Gothic Revival furniture.

Fletcher died at the age of 66 and was buried in Hampstead Cemetery, near his home.

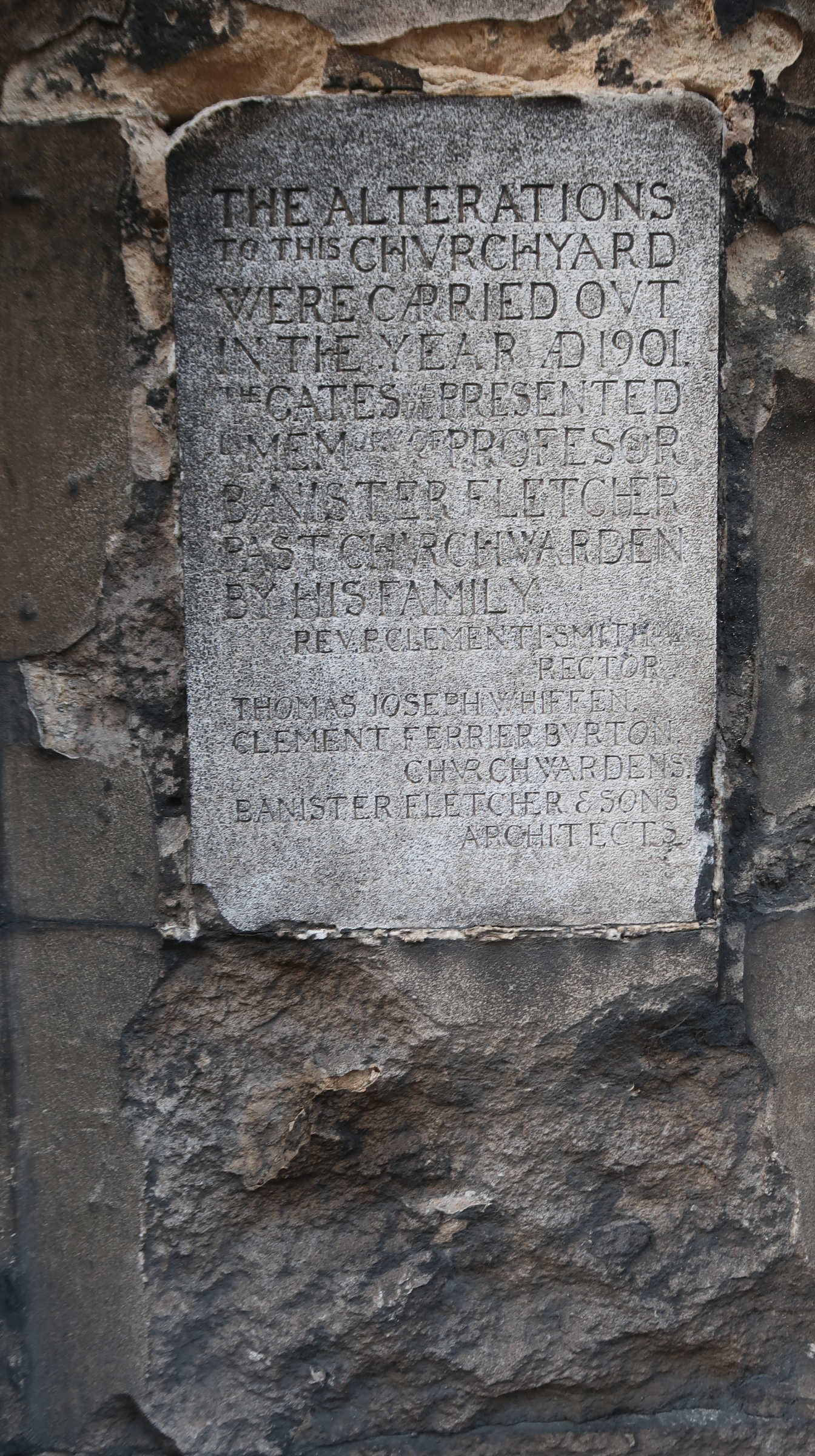
Memorial stone in the wall of St Andrew-by-the-Wardrobe church on Queen Victoria Street, London.

He is also commemorated by a plaque at the church of St. Andrew-by-the-Wardrobe in Queen Victoria Street, London EC4, where he had been churchwarden.

Fletcher married Eliza Jane Phillips in 1864. Their son, also named Banister Fletcher, became a noted architect who co-authored A History of Architecture on the Comparative Method with his father. He and another son were lecturers at King's College under their father. The history became a standard reference work, which remains in print after numerous revised editions.

== Selected works ==
- Fletcher, Banister ; Fletcher, Sir Banister; Fletcher, Herbert Phillips, Arbitrations: a text-book for arbitrators, umpires & all connected with arbitrations, more especially architects, engineers and surveyors in tabulated form, with the chief cases governing the same, and an appendix of forms, statutes, rules, etc., London : B.T. Batsford, 1904
- Fletcher, Banister, Valuations and compensations; a textbook on the practice of valuing property and on compensations in relation thereto for the use of architects, surveyors, and others, 4th ed. rev., rewritten and greatly enl., with new chapters on the Finance act, 1909, valuation for rating, mortgage, and other purposes, by Banister Flight Fletcher and Herbert Phillips Fletcher. London : B.T. Batsford [1913]

== Notes ==
Parliament of the United Kingdom
| Preceded by Gabriel Goldney | Member of Parliament for Chippenham; 1885 – 1886 | Succeeded by Lord Henry Brudenell-Bruce |
