= Advancing Physics =

British A-Level qualification

Advancing Physics is an A-level physics course examined by OCR which was developed in association with the Institute of Physics (IOP) with assessment through written examinations and teacher-assessed coursework. It may also be referred to Physics 'B' to distinguish it from OCR's other A-Level Physics course.

== Assessment ==
=== Legacy AS/A2 ===
The legacy course consists of six modules. The first three make up the AS Level, and the last three represent the A2 section of the course. All six are required in order to obtain the full A-level qualification. The modules are, in the order they are studied:

- Physics In Action (AS, assessed via. 1h examination)
- Understanding Processes (AS, assessed via. 2h examination)
- Physics In Practice (AS, teacher-assessed coursework module)
- Rise and Fall of the Clockwork Universe (A2, assessed via a 1h 15m examination)
- Field and Particle Physics (A2, assessed via. 2h examination)
- Advances In Physics (A2, teacher-assessed coursework module)

=== Current AS Level ===
The current AS Level course is linear and consists of two examination papers. All content is assessed across both papers, as opposed to being split into individual modules. The assessments are as follows:

- Foundations of Physics (assessed via a 1h 30m examination)
- Physics in Depth (assessed via a 1h 30m examination)

=== Current A Level ===
The current A Level course is linear and consists of three examination papers, in addition to a practical endorsement. All content is assessed across the three papers and practical endorsement, as opposed to being split into individual modules. The assessments are as follows:

- Fundamentals of Physics (assessed via a 2h 15m examination)
- Scientific Literacy in Physics (assessed via a 2h 15m examination)
- Practical Skills in Physics (assessed via a 1h 30m examination)
- Practical Endorsement in Physics (teacher assessed)

== Course support materials ==
The IOP have produced and published two books and two CD-ROMs to support the course. There is one book and CD-ROM for both the AS section of the course and A2 section. The two books supposedly contain all theory and methods that will be required in the exam whilst the CD-ROM offers a more in depth look at every topic as well other resources such as diagrams for show on an interactive whiteboard. The main method of browsing the text and other data on the CD is via the Folio Views software. Also included on the CD are a number of software packages such as Modellus, a package to demonstrate the effects of mathematical models and Worldmaker, a package that can help students model situations and run simulations based on events occurring. The IOP have also created examples using these programmes linked to the course and these are included on the CD and also accessible through the main browser. In addition support materials are provided via. the IoP Advancing Physics website.
