= Bertram Kite =

Joseph Bertram Kite (21 January 1857 – 15 September 1939) was the fourth Dean of Hobart, serving from 1897 to 1916.

Born into an ecclesiastical family, he was educated at Bury St Edmunds Grammar School, Marlborough and Keble College, Oxford.

He was ordained in 1882; and began his ecclesiastical career as Curate of St Michael and All Angels, Bromley-by-Bow. He was Curate in charge of Christ Church, Isle of Dogs from 1887 to 1894; and Rector of Billingford from 1894 to 1897 before his time as Dean; and Vicar of St Peter's Church, Ealing after.

Religious titles
Preceded by Charles Dundas	Dean of Hobart; 1897 – 1916	Succeeded by Robert Hay
