= Optical Society (London) =

Scientific society

The Optical Society was a scientific society founded in London in 1899, which published Transactions of the Optical Society.

The Optical Society was founded on 26 October 1899. The first president was W.H.E. Thornthwaite. The founders included Charles Algernon Parsons and Frank Twyman. Its meetings were mostly held at Imperial College London.

In 1932 it merged with the Physical Society of London, becoming the Optical Group of the Physical Society, and later the Optical Group of the Institute of Physics. The Optical Group is a member of the European Optical Society.

== See also ==
- Optical Society of America
