= Physical Society of London =

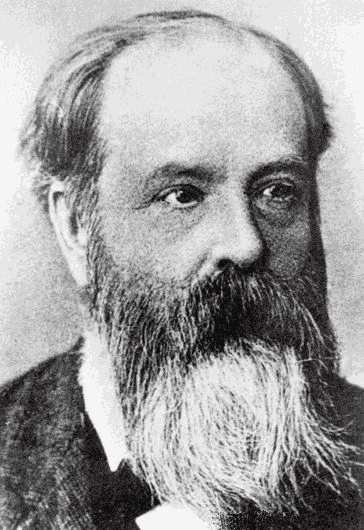
Frederick Guthrie, founder and later president of the society.

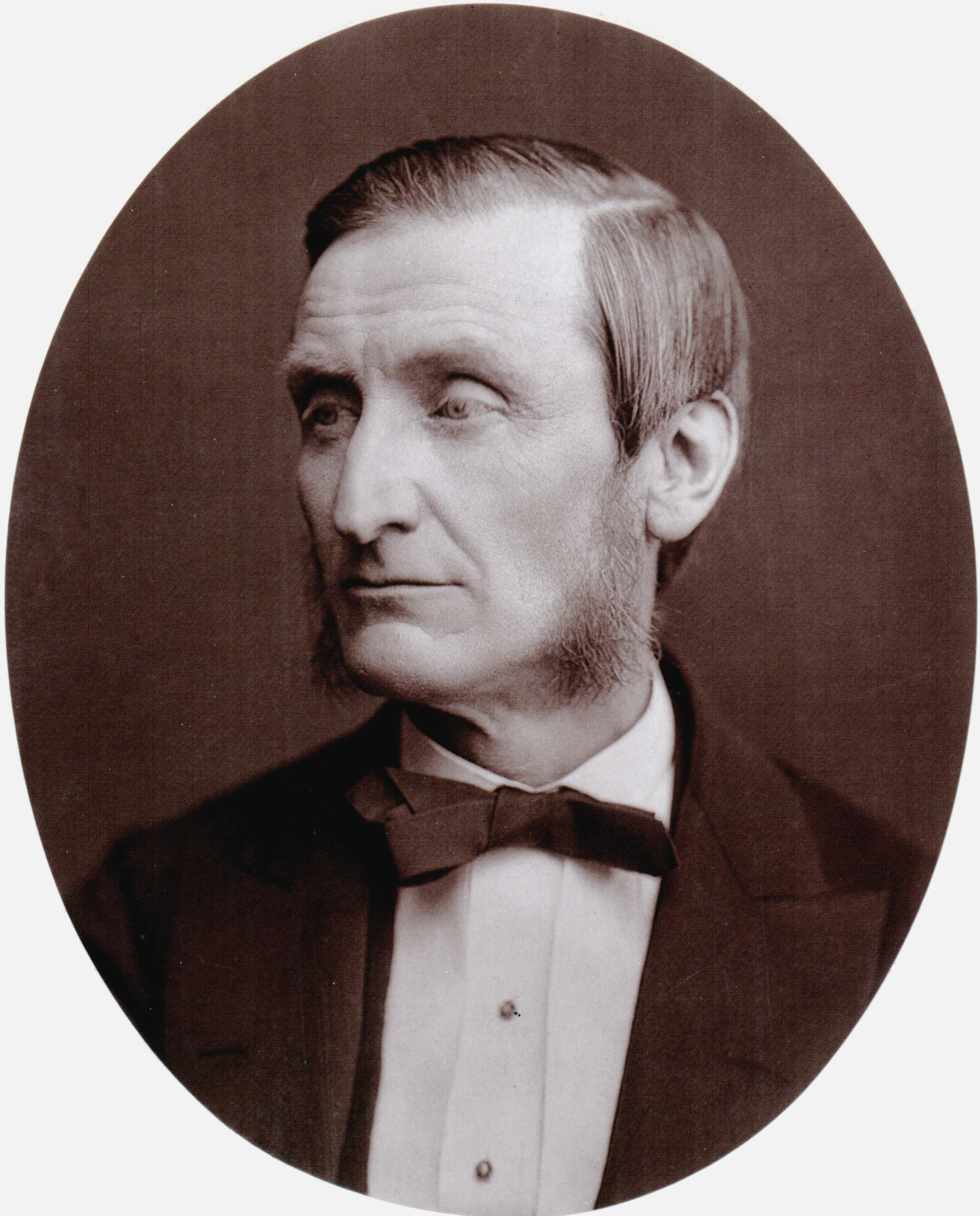
John Hall Gladstone, the first president of the society.

The Physical Society of London, England, was a scientific society which was founded in 1874. In 1921, it was renamed the Physical Society, and in 1960 it merged with the Institute of Physics (IOP), the combined organisation eventually adopting the name of the latter society.

The society was founded due to the efforts of Frederick Guthrie, Professor of Physics at the Royal College of Science, South Kensington, and his assistant, William Fletcher Barrett. They canvassed support for a 'Society for physical research' and on 14 February 1874, the Physical Society of London was formed with an initial membership of 29 people. The Society's first president was John Hall Gladstone.

Meetings were held every two weeks, mainly at Imperial College London. From its beginning, the society held open meetings and demonstrations and published Proceedings of the Physical Society of London. The first Guthrie lecture, now known as the Faraday Medal and Prize, was delivered in 1914. In 1921 the society became the Physical Society, and in 1932 absorbed the Optical Society (of London). The Optical Society published Transactions of the Optical Society from 1899 to 1932.

In 1960, the merger with the Institute of Physics took place, creating the Institute of Physics and the Physical Society, which combined the learned society tradition of the Physical Society with the professional body tradition of the Institute of Physics. Upon being granted a royal charter in 1970, the organisation renamed itself as the Institute of Physics.

== Presidents of the Physical Society ==
- 1874–1876 John H. Gladstone
- 1876–1878 George C. Foster
- 1878–1880 William G Adams
- 1880–1882 The Lord Kelvin of Largs
- 1882–1884 Robert B. Clifton
- 1884–1886 Frederick Guthrie
- 1886–1888 Balfour Stewart
- 1888–1890 Arnold W. Reinold
- 1890–1892 William E. Ayrton
- 1892–1893 George F. FitzGerald
- 1893–1895 Arthur W. Rucker
- 1895–1897 William de W. Abney
- 1897–1899 Shelford Bidwell
- 1899–1901 Oliver J. Lodge
- 1901–1903 Silvanus P. Thompson
- 1903–1905 Richard T. Glazebrook
- 1905–1906 John H. Poynting
- 1906–1908 John Perry
- 1908–1910 Charles Chree
- 1910–1912 Hugh Longbourne Callendar
- 1912–1914 Arthur Schuster
- 1914–1916 Sir Joseph Thomson
- 1916–1918 Charles V Boys
- 1918–1920 Charles Herbert Lees
- 1920–1922 Sir William Bragg
- 1922–1924 Alexander Russell
- 1924–1926 Frank Edward Smith
- 1926–1928 Owen W. Richardson
- 1928–1930 William H. Eccles
- 1930–1932 Sir Arthur Eddington
- 1932–1934 Alexander O. Rankine
- 1934–1936 Lord Rayleigh
- 1936–1938 Thomas Smith
- 1938–1941 Sir Allan Ferguson
- 1941–1943 Sir Charles Darwin
- 1943–1945 Edward N de Costa Andrade
- 1945–1947 David Brunt
- 1947–1949 George Ingle Finch
- 1949–1950 Sydney Chapman
- 1950–1952 Leslie Fleetwood Bates
- 1952–1954 Richard Whiddington
- 1954–1956 Harrie S. W. Massey
- 1956–1958 Nevill F. Mott
- 1958–1960 John A. Ratcliffe

== Other use of the name ==
In November 2021, a number of members of the civil disobedience group Extinction Rebellion succeeded in infiltrating and briefly disrupting the Lord Mayor's Show by appearing in the parade using a float disguised under the name of The Physical Society of London.

== See also ==
- Science Abstracts
