= Arnold William Reinold =

English physicist (1843–1933)

- Born: 19 June 1843; Hull
- Died: 11 April 1921 (aged 77)
- Education: M.A.
- Alma mater: Oxford
- Occupation: Physicist
- Spouse: Studdy Owen
- Parent: John Henry Arnold Reinold

Arnold William Reinold CB FRS (19 June 1843 – 11 April 1921) was an English physicist.

Born in Hull, the son of shipbroker John Henry Arnold Reinold, he received his early education at the St Peter's School, York. In 1863, he matriculated to Brasenose College, Oxford where he studied mathematics. He became a fellow of Merton College, Oxford in December, 1866; a position which he resigned in 1869 upon marrying Marian Studdy Owen—the couple had one daughter and three sons. In 1869 he was appointed the first Lee's Reader in Physics at Christ Church, and was awarded an M.A. in 1870.

In 1871 he was named Examiner in Physics at Oxford. When the Royal Naval College, Greenwich was established in 1873, he was appointed Professor of Physics there; a post he held for the next 35 years. During most of his period at Greenwich he was a lecturer at Guy's Hospital. Between 1877–93, he collaborated with English physicist Arthur William Rucker on series of papers about the properties of thin films. He was named a fellow of the Royal Society in 1883. During 1874–88 he was honorable secretary for the Physical Society of London, whereupon he was elected as president of the body.
