= Isabella Holmes =

British social reformer (1861–1949)

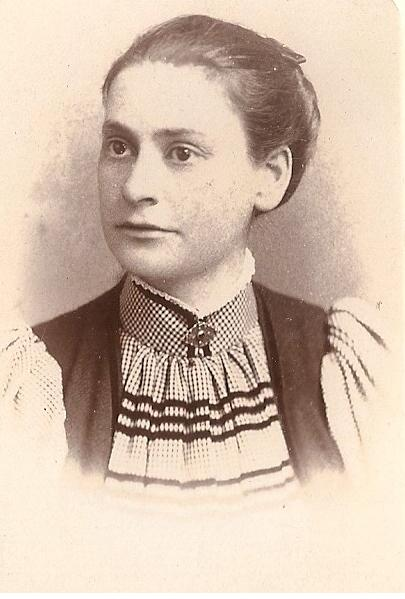
Isabella Holmes

Isabella Matilda Holmes (1861–1949) was a notable Victorian social campaigner and an advocate of opening up London's green spaces to the poor.

== Work ==
Holmes was an authority on the graveyards and parks of London. Intrepid and doughty, she chronicled every cemetery in the Capital - often at significant personal risk. Published in 1896, her book 'London Burial Grounds: Notes on their History from Earliest Times to the Present Day', remains central to understanding of the development of the capital's burial sites. She became Honorary Secretary of the Metropolitan Public Gardens Association, and her employment as scout for the Association was key to the organisation's success. Were it not for her work, much that we know about London's burial grounds and open spaces would have been lost.

== Family ==
Born in Kensington, Holmes was the daughter of chemist Dr John Hall Gladstone. In 1887, she married Basil Holmes, a local politician in Ealing, west London, and Secretary of the Metropolitan Public Gardens Association. They lived in Ealing, and had five children, Edith, Marion, Wilfred, Stephen, and Edward. The family attended St Peter's Church, Ealing, where Basil Holmes was a sidesman. Stephen Holmes became High Commissioner for Australia from 1952 to 1956. Wilfred Gladstone Holmes died in 1913 while serving as a Second Lieutenant in the Royal Garrison Artillery. He is memorialised in St Peter's Church, Ealing, where the Lady Chapel altar rails were given in his memory, as well as at Bradfield College. Isabella Holmes' half sister Margaret Ethel Gladstone became the wife of Ramsay MacDonald, Britain's first Labour Prime Minister.

== See also ==
- Environmental inequality in the United Kingdom
- Environmental justice
- Urban forest inequity
