= Stephen Holmes (diplomat) =

British diplomat (1896–1980)

Sir Stephen Lewis Holmes KCMG MC (5 July 1896 – 20 April 1980) was a British diplomat who became High Commissioner of the United Kingdom to Australia from 1952 to 1956.

Holmes was educated at Westminster School and Christ Church, Oxford. Between 1916 and 1919 he served as a 2nd Lieutenant in the First World War in France and Belgium, and was awarded the Military Cross, and mentioned twice in despatches. He entered the Colonial Office in 1921, becoming Secretary of the Office of the High Commissioner for the United Kingdom in Canada between 1936 and 1939, and Assistant Secretary of the Dominions Office from 1939 to 1943. In 1943–1944, he was Dominions Office representative in Washington, and thereafter Deputy High Commissioner for the United Kingdom in Canada (1944–1946). Holmes became Under Secretary of the Board of Trade in 1946, Second Secretary of the Board of Trade between 1947 and 1951, and Deputy Under-Secretary of State for the Commonwealth Relations Office in 1951. In 1952 Holmes was appointed High Commissioner of Australia to the United Kingdom, a post which he held until 1956. He was awarded the Companion of the Order of St Michael and St George (CMG) in 1942 and Knight Commander of the same order (KCMG) in 1950, and was Master of the Leathersellers' Company between 1967 and 1968.

Stephen Holmes was the son of Basil Holmes and Isabella Holmes, a leading social reformer. Isabella Holmes was daughter of British chemist John Hall Gladstone and half-sister of Margaret Ethel MacDonald, wife of Prime Minister Ramsay MacDonald. Stephen Holmes married Noreen Charlotte Trench on 21 January 1922. They had three children. Stephen's brother, Wilfred Gladstone Holmes, died in 1913 while serving as a Second Lieutenant in the Royal Garrison Artillery. Wilfred Holmes is memorialised in St Peter's Church, Ealing, and at Bradfield College.

Diplomatic posts
Preceded by Sir Edward Williams	High Commissioner to Australia; 1952–1956	Succeeded by The Lord Carrington
