= David Lublinski =

David Lublinski (1931–2017) was a British artist noted for his sculpture in stone, terracotta and papier-mâché, and for his ink drawings and work in oils. Lublinski's art can be found in public collections at The University of Exeter, Hertford College, Oxford and at St Edmund Hall, Oxford. He was a Fellow of the Royal Society of Arts and lived in Devon. Lublinski was the youngest grandson of watercolour artist James Allen Shuffrey and a grandnephew of the architectural designer Leonard Shuffrey.
