= The Church Quarterly Review =

- Discipline: Church of England, Theology
- Language: English

Publication details
- History: 1875–1971
- Publisher: Society for Promoting Christian Knowledge (since 1920) (England)
- Frequency: Quarterly

Standard abbreviations
- ISO 4: Church Q. Rev.

Indexing
- ISSN: 0269-4034

The Church Quarterly Review (now abbreviated CQR) was an English journal published by the Society for Promoting Christian Knowledge. It existed independently from 1875 until 1968; in that year it merged with the London Quarterly and Holborn Review, a Methodist journal and became known as The Church Quarterly, which was published until 1971.

== History ==
It was first published privately in 1875, at the instigation of Richard William Church, then Dean of St Paul's Cathedral, and focused on Church of England and theology issues from a high church perspective. Its original mission statement was "to be worthily representative of the teaching and position of the Church of England", and it advertised itself as "the recognised organ of orthodox opinion for the Church of England". The first issue was published in October 1875, and the first article ("Italy and her Church") was written by William Ewart Gladstone.

In 1920, the Society for Promoting Christian Knowledge took over the journal, and ended its longstanding policy of publishing mainly anonymous contributions as well as its high church associations; in 1921, longtime editor A. C. Headlam gave up his position.

Between 1952 and 1852, the review was owned and published by Paul Shuffrey. Shuffrey was a notable colonial administrator and the son of architect Leonard Shuffrey. Shuffrey edited the Review from his flat on New Cavendish Street, above his father's former showroom. The 1955 edition went to print soon after Shuffrey's death, and was dedicated to its late editor.

In 1968, the journal merged with the London Quarterly and Holborn Review, a Methodist journal (merged from two Victorian journals). The result of this merger was The Church Quarterly, which ceased publication in 1971.

== Editors ==
- 1876–1879: Arthur Rawson Ashwell
- 1881: Cazenove
- 1901–1921: Arthur Cayley Headlam
- 1952-1955: Paul Shuffrey
- 1956–1969: John William Charles Wand
