= Paul Shuffrey =

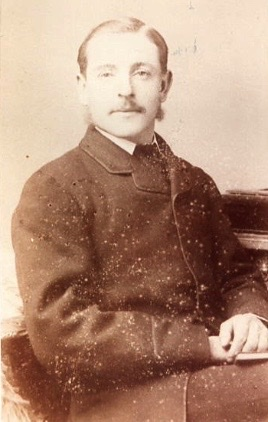
Paul Shuffrey (courtesy of the Shuffrey Family)

Paul Shuffrey (1889–1955) was a British colonial administrator, editor and publisher.

== Early life ==
Born in Ealing, London, in 1889, Paul Shuffrey was the son of Leonard Shuffrey, the leading architect and architectural designer. His mother was Martha Shuffrey, great granddaughter of James Hardy, relative of Admiral Sir Thomas Hardy, Captain of the Victory. Shuffrey was the eldest of three children, including Gilbert (b. 1891) and Kathleen (b. 1899). They also a half-brother, Leonard Jnr, from their father's previous marriage. Shuffrey was also the nephew of the celebrated watercolour artist James Allen Shuffrey. His father's cousin was William Shuffrey (1851-1932), who became Vicar of Arncliffe and Honorary Canon of Ripon Cathedral. Shuffrey studied at St Paul's School and Lincoln College, Oxford, obtaining an MA in literature & humanities. He went on to University College London to study architecture, and later qualified in law and African languages.

== Work ==
Shuffrey entered the Colonial Service in 1912. The following year he became Political Officer for Imperri District, Sierra Leone, following rebellion in the region. He later became Private Secretary to Sir Edward Merewether, Governor and Commander in Chief, and later to Merewether's successor, Richard James Wilkinson. Shuffrey served many years in provincial administration as District Commissioner and acting Provincial Commissioner. He received the thanks of the Government for his measures taken during the rebellion of 1919.

Shuffrey resigned in 1924, and returned to England to assist his father with his business of Shuffrey & Co. He was not a trained architect, and following his father's death two years later, the business was closed. He continued to live in a flat at the premises on New Cavendish Street, London, for the rest of his life.

Shuffrey edited the Social Service Review, and between 1939 and 1951, and the Church Guardian. In 1952 he became Proprietor and Editor of the Church Quarterly Review. The 1955 edition went to print soon after Shuffrey's death, and was dedicated to its late editor.

On his death Shuffrey made a gift to his college, Lincoln College, Oxford, in memory of his father, to endow a fellowship in the field of architecture, classics and art history.

== Family ==
Shuffrey's brother, Lt. Gilbert Shuffrey, was killed fighting with the South Lancashire Regiment at the Battle of Gallipoli in August 1915 and is commemorated on Helles Memorial. He is also memorialised on Ealing War Memorial, which was designed by their father Leonard Shuffrey, and on the War Memorial at St Peter's Church, Ealing, also partly designed by their father.

Shuffrey was a collector of African artefacts. On his death his sister donated a collection of textiles assembled by her brother during his time in Sierra Leone to the Horniman Museum in South London.
