= Leonard Shuffrey =

British architect and architectural designer (1852–1926)

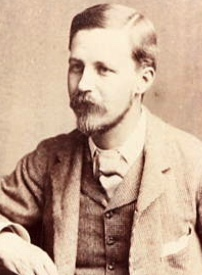
Leonard Shuffrey

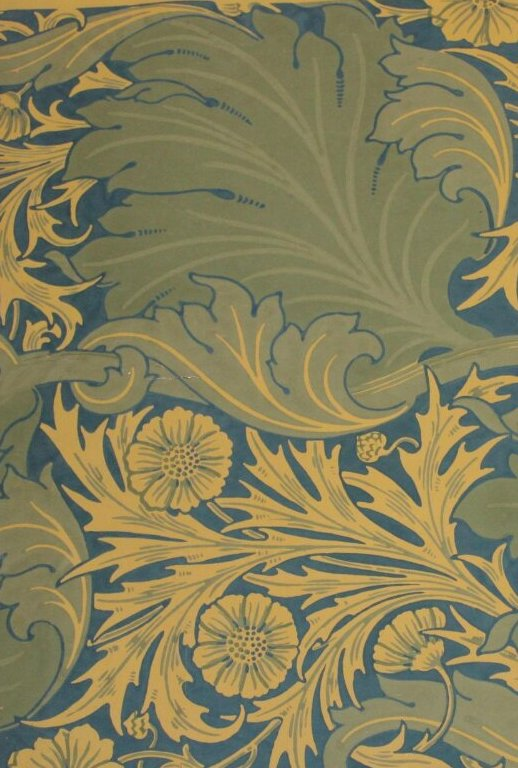
Shuffrey & Co frieze wallpaper with a pattern of large scrolling leaves and dandelion plants, c. 1880–90. From the Collection of the Victoria & Albert Museum.

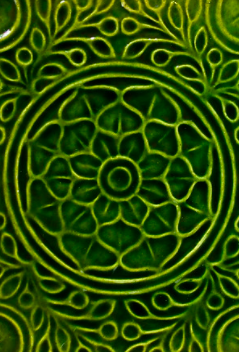
Section from a Shuffrey & Co. moulded and glazed tile.

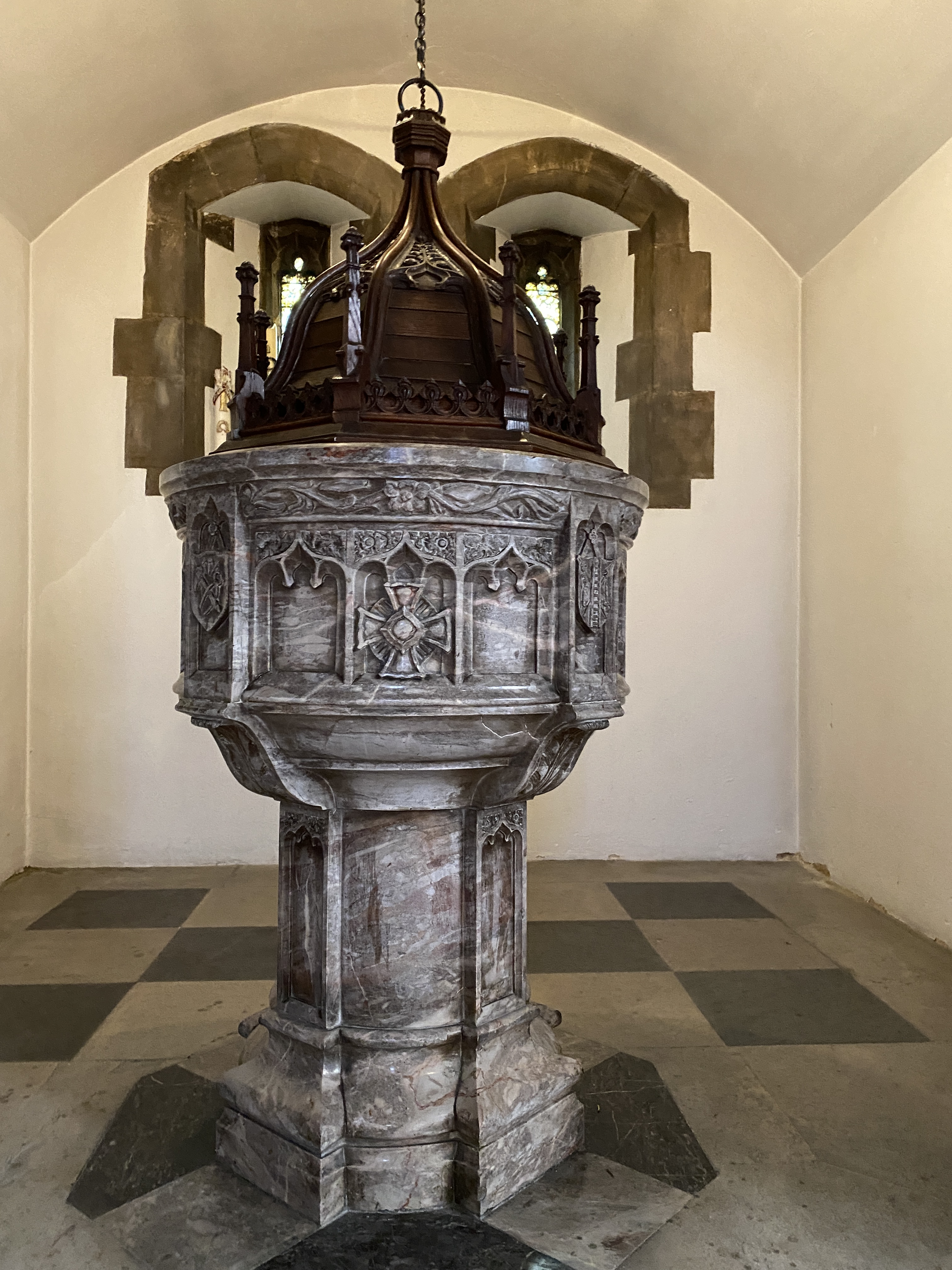
Font designed by Leonard Shuffrey at St Peter's Church, Ealing

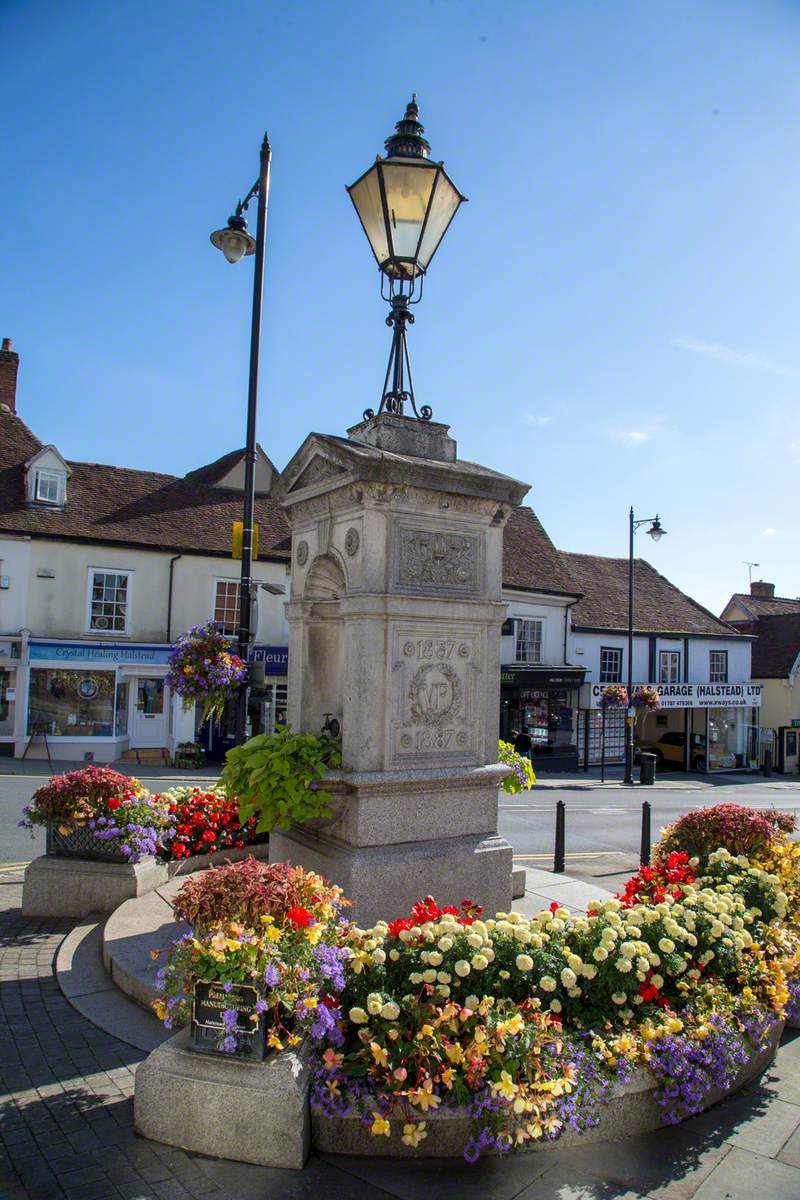
The Jubilee Drinking Fountain (1888) in Halstead, Essex, designed by Leonard Shuffrey.

Leonard Shuffrey (31 March 1852 – 27 December 1926) was a British architect and architectural designer of the late Victorian and Edwardian period. He was a leading figure of the aesthetic movement that had a significant impact on the development of buildings and their interiors and their settings, both across London and the South of England. Noted for his wallpaper, fireplaces and ornate plasterwork, Shuffrey was thought the equal of William Morris in his creativity and skill as a craftsman. His output is often found in decorative schemes with William Morris, Edward Ould, William De Morgan, and other preeminent Arts & Crafts and late Pre-Raphaelite decorative artists of the day.

== Early life and family ==
Leonard Atkinson Shuffrey was born on 31 March 1852 in Wood Green, Witney, Oxfordshire, into an old Wood Green family of blanket weavers and tanners of Huguenot origin, who had lived at 7 Narrow Hill since the early eighteenth century. His parents were Samuel Shuffrey (1810–1889) and Sarah Shuffrey, née Baylis (1819–1875). One of seven siblings, Shuffrey was the elder brother of the celebrated watercolour artist James Allen Shuffrey. Their cousin was the Revd William Shuffrey (1851–1932), who was Vicar of Arncliffe and Honorary Canon of Ripon Cathedral. Leonard Shuffrey attended Bloxham School between 1856 and 1867.

Shuffrey's first marriage, in 1873, was to Sarah Fletcher, a relative of Banister Fletcher (senior), with whom he had a son, also named Leonard. Leonard senior's second wife, whom he married in 1877 after the death of Sarah, was Martha Carey, great-granddaughter of James Hardy, relative of Admiral Sir Thomas Hardy, Captain of the Victory. Leonard and Martha had two sons, Gilbert (born 1891) and Paul Shuffrey (born 1889), and a daughter, Kathleen (b. 1899). All of Shuffrey's sons attended St Paul's School, London.

== Work ==
Leonard Shuffrey worked briefly for Carron's ironworks, before becoming articled to the architect Banister Fletcher (senior) in London. In 1871, after several years of architectural experience, he became an early member of the Architectural Association, where he was an associate of Aston Webb. This was the start of a long collaboration with Aston Webb, with Shuffrey providing numerous interior fittings for Webb's buildings, including at Christ's Hospital, Horsham (1902), his Birmingham University Buildings, (1909). and for Webb's Malvern College War Memorial Library (1925).

Shuffrey was, above all things, a superlative craftsman. Early in his career he developed an intense interest in decorative design, and appears to have focused on, and made a name for himself in, this area of work.

In 1880, with the help of a sleeping partner, George Campbell Sherrin, Shuffrey founded his practice, Shuffrey & Co., with the aim of supplying fireplaces, wallpaper, tiles, and later, decorative plasterwork. The firm, had premises at 38–39 New Cavendish Street in London. Shuffrey & Co's work can be found across London and the South of England – particularly in London, and his home county of Oxfordshire. The firm had a woodworking factory, managed by Shuffrey's son Leonard, for making the overmantles and fireplaces, near to the Shuffrey's family's home in Wood Green, Witney.

In 1880, Shuffrey won a competition run by The British Architect magazine to design a terracotta fireplace. The award was presented by the architect Alfred Waterhouse, who noted that Shuffrey was already well established in this field. Shuffrey was later to provide fireplaces for Waterhouse's Pearl Life Assurance Building in Liverpool (1896–1898).

Shuffrey & Co. sought business through advertising in journals and magazines, and by exhibiting at trade events. In 1882, the firm had a stand at the Fine Art & Industrial Exhibition at St James' Hall in Manchester, where their display included mantels, fireplaces, paperhangings and door furniture.

Shuffrey's achievements were unique, but parallel the decorative craftsmanship of William Morris, whom he knew. Like Morris, he was a skilled craftsman and took up decoration after first gaining architectural experience. Shuffrey could always demonstrate to the wood carver or modeller in clay, with his own hand the effect he wanted, and everything that came from his studio reflected his own skill as a craftsman and designer. However, he was 20 years younger than Morris, and his work drove a change from the often-dense detail of Morris, to cleaner lines and decorative restraint.

He became a Member of the Incorporated Institute of British Decorators in 1889, the year of its creation. Shuffrey was later a Council Member, Treasurer, Vice President and President of the organisation.

Shuffrey spent his leisure time drawing architectural details and creating watercolour sketches. His notebooks were reported to be a substantial and fascinating repository of interesting historical details.

The architect's main interest and talent was for decorative design, but he was also a highly accomplished designer of buildings (although only a few examples are known). In 1888, having acquired land in North Ealing, Shuffrey built Thorncote, his 'Bedford Park' style home on Edgehill Road. The house features pedimented gables, multi-paned sashes and other Dutch and Queen Anne features, including a hipped, tiled roof and big-hooded porch. The building is now Grade II listed. He also built 'Ingleside', the adjacent house, with its 'crowstepped' gable, and 'The Old Coach House' opposite. Shuffrey decorated his house with William Morris wallpaper, and tiles by William De Morgan.

Shuffrey also delighted in drawing and creating the type of cotswold stone cottages he had known since his childhood, and a number of houses in Wood Green, Witney, were built and adapted by Leonard for the Shuffrey family. In addition, in 1909, Shuffrey and his siblings donated a pulpit and chancel screen dedicated to their parents in Holy Trinity Church, Wood Green. The work was designed by Shuffrey and executed in his Wood Green workshop nearby.

=== Wallpaper ===
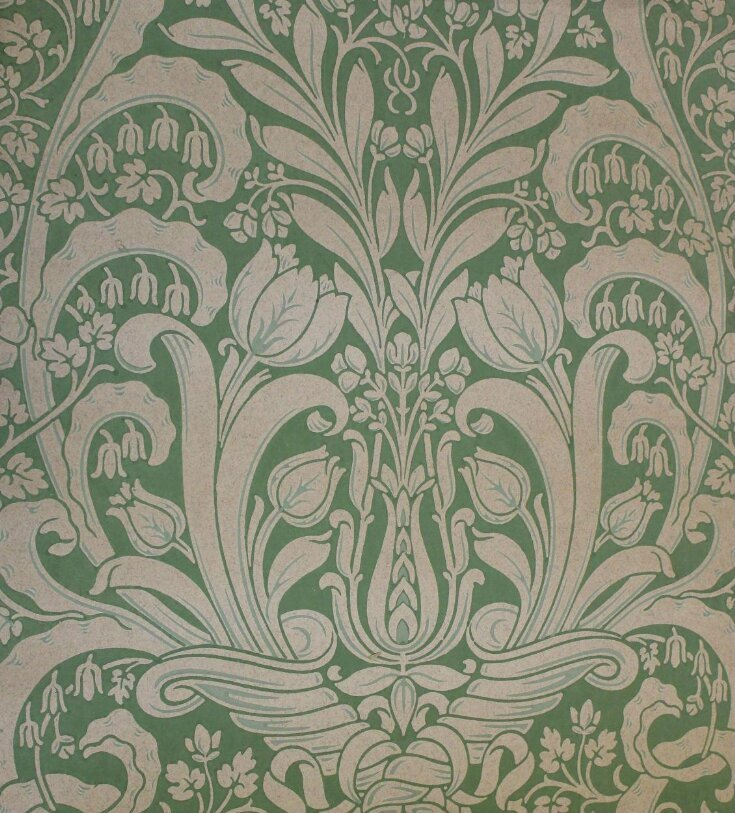
Shuffrey wallpaper, from the Collection of the Victoria & Albert Museum

Shuffrey's wallpaper was thought to be second only to William Morris in its invention and its creator's craftsmanship. His firm had works in Herne Hill, South London, where the paper was printed using wooden blocks.

Shuffrey & Co produced a number of sample book of their wallpaper designs. The second book was launched in 1886, with The Builder Magazine, praising the "simplicity and lack of ostentation" of the designs, adding, "architects will be glad to have this book".

A further book was produced in 1891. The paper, which was skilled yet simple in design, was printed in shades of chocolate, greens, and buffs. It was praised for its creativity and affordability by ordinary home owners: "Shuffrey appear to have met a want in producing inexpensive wall-papers of good design suitable for houses of the middle-classes, and the prices they quote are sufficiently low to enable a tenant to paper his room throughout with patterns that will form a quiet background, and be free from artistic objections."

The Builder Magazine wrote: "The 'Daisy' pattern, in red, blue, and green, is pleasingly arranged, well covering the ground with leaves and flowers, and the price is 3s. per piece. We may also note the patterns 'Ox-Eye,' 'Indian' (No. 6), the 'Cone,' 'Honeysuckle' (No. 17), 'Diaper' 'Moresque' (No. 18), as suitable for rooms of ordinary houses."

Shuffrey even provided notes on the use of the paper: "A pleasing way of treating the side of a room is to paper with these (dado papers, Nos. 1, 2, and 3 in the book) to a height of about three- fourths that of the room, finishing with a picture rail rebated, as shown on sketch, to receive brass picture hooks, and covering the space above with an embossed enrichment or a lighter paper. By this treatment pictures have the advantage of a dark rich background, and an effect of air and space is obtained by the lighter decoration above."

=== Fireplaces ===
Designing fireplaces enabled Shuffrey to employ a variety of materials, and every fireplace was treated as an individual piece of decorative work. They were used extensively by leading architects, who appreciated the quality of Shuffrey's drawings, and were willing to rely on his judgement. Fireplaces provided a central occupation of Shuffrey's lifetime, and his showrooms were filled with interesting examples in wood and metal, "amongst which he moved like a curator in museum, loving to explain memorable facts about them".

Many well-known buildings were furnished with Shuffrey fireplaces, including the Victoria & Albert Museum the Bank of England, Admiralty Buildings, York Cottage on the Sandringham Estate, the Royal Air Force Club and Imperial College, London. Shuffrey wrote his book, The English Fireplace, published by Batsford in 1912, which became required reading for architects and designers.

=== Ceilings ===
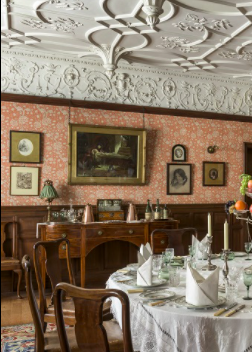
Leonard Shuffrey's dining room plaster frieze and strap-work ceiling at Wightwick Manor

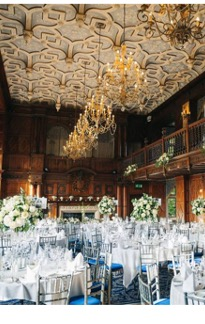
Decorated ceiling at The Mount by Leonard Shuffrey

Shuffrey & Co also designed and made decorated ceilings, chiefly in 'fibrous' plasterwork but also in wood. In 1893, Shuffrey was asked to design ceilings at Wightwick Manor near Wolverhampton, which was being built by Edward Ould for Theodore Mander, of the Mander family. The billiard and dining room ceilings which he created are in the Jacobean style with pendants, and with ornate friezes below. Other artists and designers commissioned to decorate and furnish the old English style manor were Charles Eamer Kempe, who designed stained glass windows, and William Morris.

In 1908, Shuffrey was again called into service by Edward Ould and the Maunder Family. Charles Tertius Mander, a cousin of Theodore Mander at Wightwick Manor, was undertaking an ongoing Arts & Crafts remodelling of his house, The Mount, near to Wolverhampton. The work entailed the addition of a 55-foot 'Jacobean' library; a two-story Edwardian living hall with a sprung floor for ballroom dancing, a cabin and music gallery with a secret staircase 'carried up in the fireplace recess'. Shuffrey's ceiling is lavish, with pendant bosses and armatures on wood bracketing. Other artists and designers who contributed to the decoration of The Mount included Herbert Bryans and Christoper Webb, who designed the stained glass.

Shuffrey also designed the Arts & Crafts restoration ceiling at Owlpen Manor in Gloucestershire, again for the Mander Family. Here his work complements heraldic stained glass by Herbert Bryans and Christopher Webb, and the Library by his old collaborator Edward Ould. In 1926, the final year of Shuffrey's life, he designed a plaster barrel roof for the 'new' War Memorial Library at Trinity College, Oxford.

=== Tiles ===
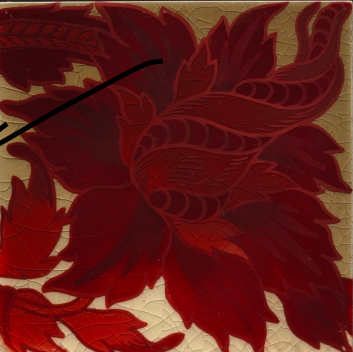
Shuffrey & Co. lustre tile c. 1890

Little is known about Shuffrey's tiles. Shuffrey & Co. designed lustre tiles in the style of William de Morgan and William Morris. Just two transfer printed tile designs were registered by Shuffrey, as well as a number of moulded designs. Shuffrey's tiles were probably created on blanks by Maw & Co. Shuffrey & Co tiles and glazed fireplaces were used in the refurbishing of two starcases at Brasenose College in 1885, along with tiles by William Morris and William De Morgan.

== Final years ==
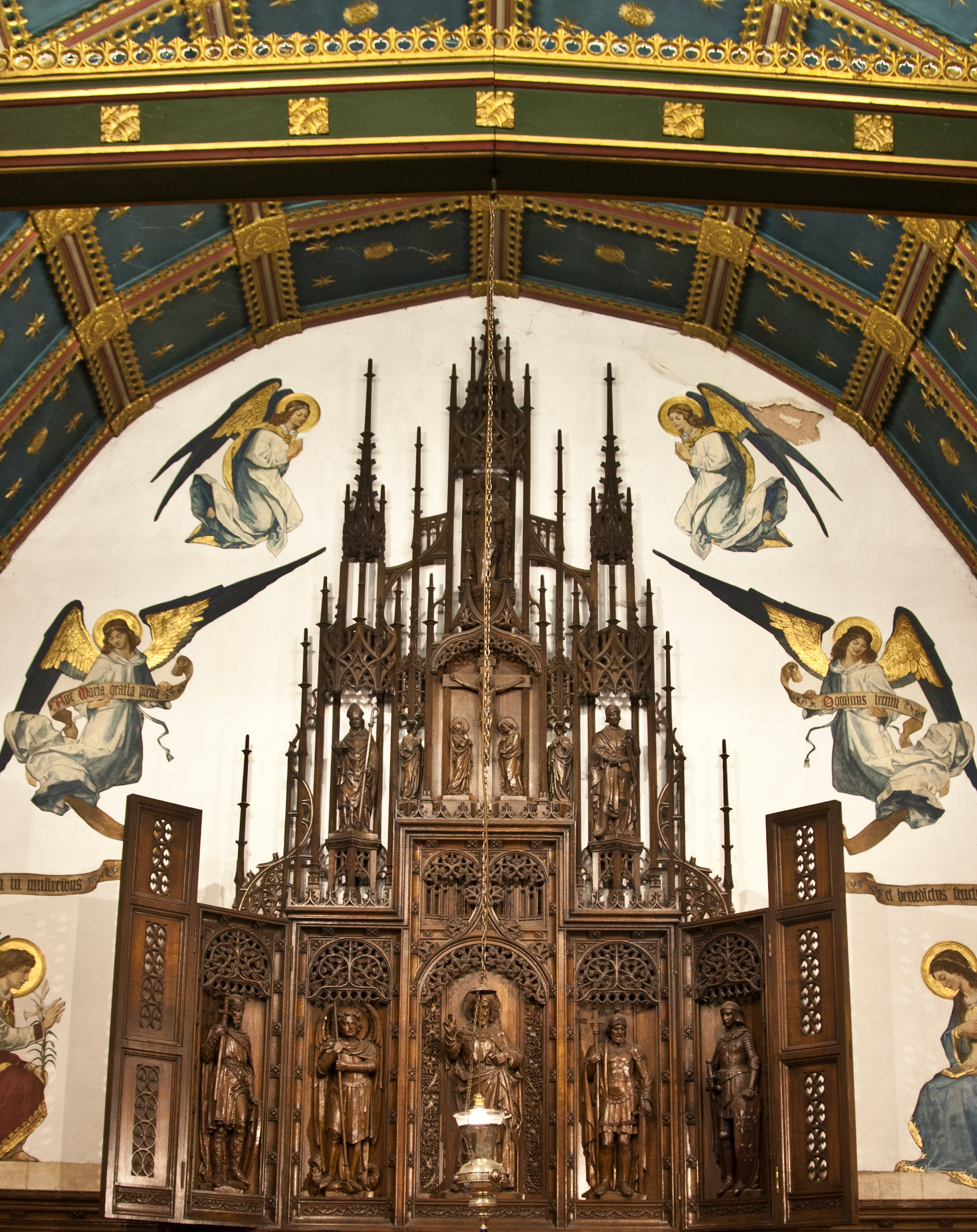
The memorial reredos at St Peter's Church, Ealing which Shuffrey was closely involved in designing

Shuffrey's second son, Lt Gilbert Shuffrey, was killed during the Great War, casting a shadow over the architect's final years. Gilbert died fighting with the South Lancashire Regiment at the Battle of Gallipoli in August 1915, and is commemorated on Helles Memorial. He is also memorialised on Ealing War Memorial, which was designed by his father; Gilbert's is the only name to appear in full.

Gilbert Shuffrey is also commemorated at St Peter's Church, Ealing where in 1921 his father was closely involved in the design of a remarkable carved oak reredos, dominating the Church's Lady Chapel – part of the chapel's redecoration and furnishing as a War Memorial. The east wall around the reredos was further beautified in 1928 with highly accomplished painted angels by another Ealing-based artist, Henry Charles Brewer. Gilbert's name also appears on a Roll of Honour in the chapel, and an illuminated Memorial Book.

Shuffrey, who had attended and been a member of the Church Council of St Peter's with his family since the Church's completion in 1893, contributed other items to the Church, including the alabaster high altar, a font, and the Lady Chapel altar. In 1896 a visit was paid to the newly completed St Peter's by the members of the Architectural Association, who afterwards received tea at Thorncote, Shuffrey's new House a short distance away. Shuffrey also designed War Memorials for Bloxham School, his alma mater, and Henry Box School (Witney Grammar School).

In 1924, Shuffrey's son Paul Shuffrey, who had become a notable colonial administrator in Sierra Leone, returned to England to help his father to run Shuffrey & Co. In July the following year, Shuffrey was awarded the Gold Medal of the Incorporated Institute of British Decorators. The medal was presented by Sir Banister Fletcher, the son of Shuffrey's first employer Banister Fletcher (senior), and an old friend. The ceremony was held at Painters' Hall, where Shuffrey had earlier designed a decorated plaster ceiling. The medal had had only three previous recipients – the distinguished architects and designers William Blake Richmond, John Dibblee Crace and Metford Warner.

Shuffrey died on Monday 27 December 1926 at Thorncote, the house he had built in Ealing almost 40 years earlier. His funeral was held at St Peter's Church, Ealing on Friday 31 December, and he was buried in Witney. Shuffrey's decorated plaster barrel roof in the 'new' War Memorial Library at Trinity College, Oxford was still under construction when he died.

In early 1927, shortly after Shuffrey's death, an obituary in Architecture magazine commented that Shuffrey "exercised an influence second only to William Morris. Nothing came from his studio that did not bear the impress of his own faculty for design, and looking back over the wide range of wall papers, fireplace, paster work, hand painted tiles, woodwork, ecclesiastical decoration, and stained glass, it is hard to believe that the life of one man could comprise so much invention."

Shuffrey & Co closed after its Principal's death in 1926. This was partly because Paul Shuffrey was not a trained architect and lacked his father's skill as a craftsman, compounded by a substantial reduction in demand following the War. Paul Shuffrey continued to live in a flat at the firm's former premises on New Cavendish Street, from where he edited the Church Quarterly Review. The Shuffrey family remained at Thorncote until the 1950s.

Paul Shuffrey died in 1955. His will made provision to endow a fellowship at Lincoln College, Oxford in his father's memory, since when there have been numerous notable Shuffrey Fellows. The Fellowship continues to this day.

== Legacy ==
Although heavily indebted to William Morris and others, Shuffrey was part of a different generation of artists, moving away from what they saw as excessive detail. Shuffrey therefore undoubtedly influenced the younger Art nouveaux and Art Deco artists and designers who succeeded him. Shuffey and his contemporaries also created a revolution in the availability of their work to the middle-classes - driving the democratisation of high-quality decorative design.

== Known works ==
=== Decorated ceilings ===
- Wightwick Manor, near Wolverhampton. Elaborate Shuffrey & Co. pendant imitation Jacobean plaster ceiling and frieze in the dining room and billiard room.
- The Mount, near Wolverhampton. Shuffrey designed the ceiling for the new Library (1908).
- Owlpen Manor, Gloucestershire. Shuffrey & Co. Arts & Crafts ceilings.
- Painter's Hall, London. Dining room hall ceiling.
- Trinity College, Oxford. Decorated Shuffrey & Co. plaster barrel roof in the War Memorial Library.
- Oxford Union. Shuffrey & Co. decorated Library plaster ceiling.
- Bryn Hafod house in Kettering, by John Alfred Gotch (1896). Shuffrey designed the ceilings.

=== Wallpaper ===
- Six examples of Shuffrey & Co wallpaper are held by the Victoria & Albert Museum.
- The Leeds & Yorkshire Architectural Society, installed Shuffrey & Co Wallpaper when they moved into their new premises on Albion Street, Leeds, in 1883.

=== Ecclesiastical fittings ===
- St Peter's Church, Ealing. Shuffrey Marble font, alabaster high altar, Lady Chapel altar and reredos.
- Holy Trinity Church, Wood Green, Witney (1909). Pulpit donated in memory of Leonard Shuffrey's parents and made in his Wood Green workshop to his design.
- St Paul's Church, Great Portland Street, (1894). Shuffrey & Co built a hexagonal oak pulpit, to the designs of Paul Waterhouse of Alfred Waterhouse & Sons.

=== Fireplaces ===
- Admiralty buildings, London
- Bank of England, London
- University of Birmingham buildings designed by Aston Webb and Ingress Bell in 1909. Shuffrey & Co. stoves, grates and mantels.
- Royal Institution of Chartered Surveyors building on Great George Street, designed by Alfred Waterhouse in 1899. Shuffrey & Co, provided grates and chimneypieces.
- Coutts Bank building, The Strand, London, 1904, designed by John Macvicar Anderson. Shuffrey & Co provided fireplaces & grates.
- Christ's Hospital, architect Aston Webb, 1902. Shuffrey & Co. grates and mantles.
- Imperial College, London
- New Holborn Baths, in London, built in 1902, with Shuffrey & Co. chimneypieces.
- Malvern College War Memorial Library, architect Sir Aston Webb, 1925. Shuffrey & Co. supplied the fireplace in the upper hall.
- Pearl Life Assurance Building (1896–98), Liverpool.
- Phoenix Assurance Building, King William Street, London, 1916, designed by J. Macvicar Anderson and H. L. Anderson, Architects. Shuffrey & Co. provided the grates.* Rotherhithe Town Hall, London (destroyed 1944)
- Royal Air Force Club, London
- St. Felix School, Southwold, 1916, Arnold Mitchell Architect. Shuffrey & Co. grates and chimney pieces.
- Victoria & Albert Museum new galleries fronting Cromwell road, architect Aston Webb 1899–1909. Shuffrey & Co fireplaces.
- York Cottage, Sandringham

=== War memorials ===
- Bloxham School, Oxfordshire
- Ealing Town War Memorial, London
- Henry Box School (Witney Grammar School), Oxfordshire

=== Other work ===
- The Architectural Association's premises at 56 Great Marlborough Street 91901). Shuffrey & Co carried out alterations to create a new Common Room, under the supervision of the Association's of President, George Fellowes Prynne.
- The Jubilee Drinking Fountain in Halstead, Essex designed by Shuffrey in 1888. The stone fountain sits on a circular plinth with flower beds, and steps. There are two fountains, with bowls, in shell recesses with projecting keystones, and string courses and patterns. The fountain has a pediment top, with acanthus cornice and foliate panels on east and west sides. It was presented to Halstead by George Courtauld (politician), and commemorates Queen Victoria's Golden Jubilee.
