= John Hall Gladstone =

British chemist (1827-1902)

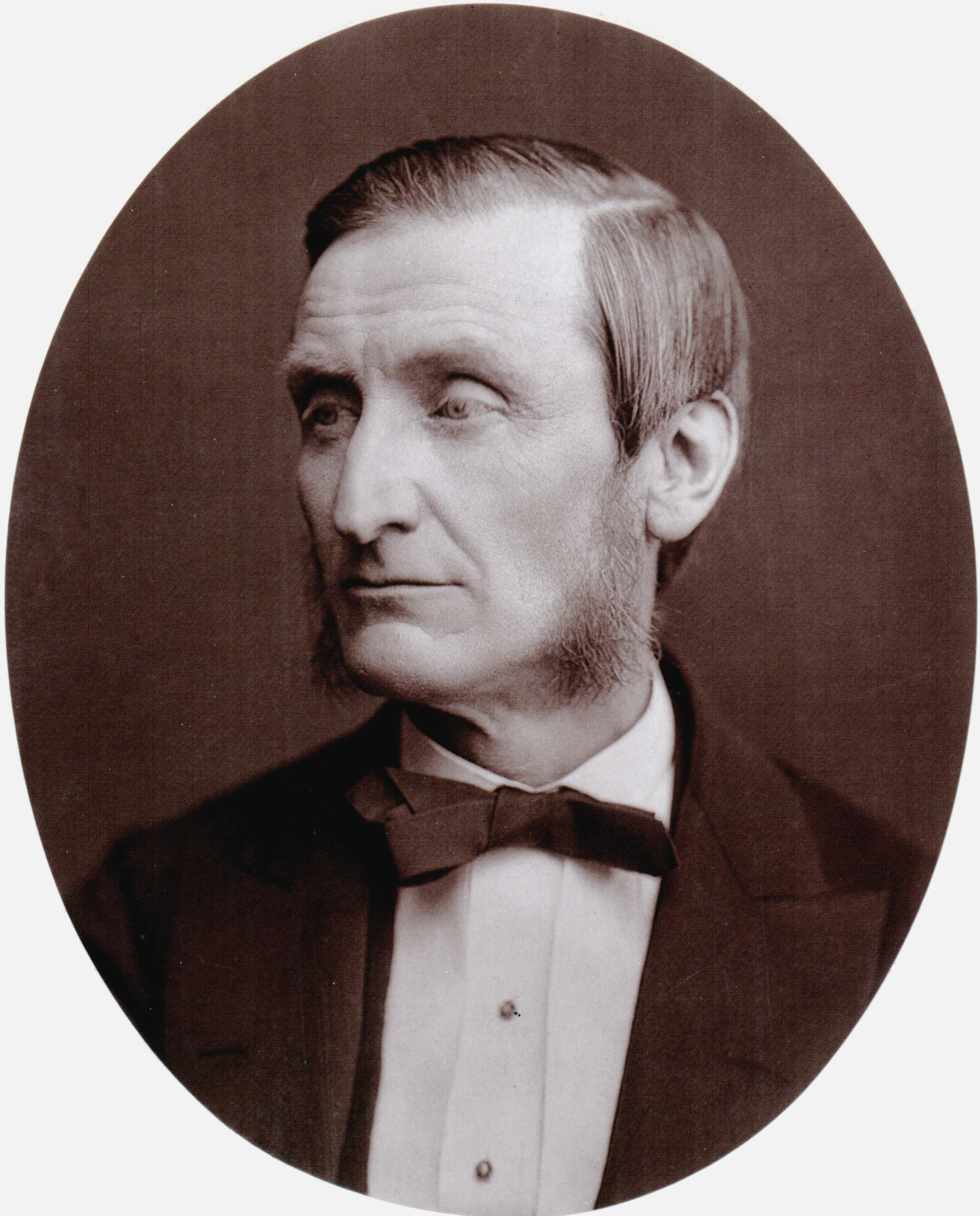
- Born: 7 March 1827; London, England
- Died: 6 October 1902 (aged 75); London, England
- Resting place: Kensal Green Cemetery, London
- Known for: Gladstone–Dale relation
- Awards: Davy Medal (1897)
- Scientific career
- Fields: Chemistry
- Spouse(s): May Tilt (m. 1852; died 1864) Margaret Thompson King (m. 1869; died 1870)
- Children: 7
- Relatives: Margaret Gladstone (daughter); Ramsay MacDonald (son-in-law); Isabella Gladstone (daughter); Sir Stephen Holmes (grandson)

John Hall Gladstone FRS (7 March 1827 – 6 October 1902) was a British chemist. He served as President of the Physical Society between 1874 and 1876 and during 1877–1879 was President of the Chemical Society. Apart from chemistry, where one of his most notable publications was on bromination of rubber, he undertook pioneering work in optics and spectroscopy.

== Biography ==
He was born to John Gladstone, a wholesale draper in Hackney, London and Alison Hall, as the eldest of three sons. The three brothers were educated entirely at home under tutors, and from very early days all showed a strong inclination toward natural science. In 1842, the father retired from business, and the family spent a year in travelling on the continent. Part of this time was passed in Italy with their old friends: Charles Tilt, his wife and their daughter May, who in 1852 became the wife of John Hall Gladstone. They had seven children, including Isabella Holmes, who later became a noted social reformer, and an expert on London's burial grounds.

From early years Gladstone had shown strong religious tendencies, and when, at the age of seventeen, the question of his future career came to be discussed, he wished to enter the Christian ministry. From this course he was dissuaded both by his father and by Mr. Tilt, and in December 1844 he entered University College, London. Here he attended Graham's lectures on chemistry and worked in his private laboratory, and here he prepared his earliest scientific contribution on "Analysis of Sand from St. Michael's Bay, Normandy", which was read at a meeting of the Royal Chemical Society on 16 November 1846. Next year, he received a gold medal from the college for his study on "Gun Cotton and Xyloidine". Later in the same year he went to University of Giessen to work under Justus von Liebig, returning in April 1848 with the degree of Doctor of Philosophy. The subject of his dissertation was possibly "Artificial Formation of Urea from Fulminic Acid".

Although Gladstone had thus formally adopted the pursuit of science as his career, he continued throughout his life to take an active part in religious work. In Clapham his parents were members of the Rev. James Hill's Congregational Church, and here he taught in the Sunday School, beside conducting services in a Mission Room at White Square. Later on he held a Bible Class for young men on Sunday afternoons, and until the end of his life he was intimately connected with the work of the Young Men's Christian Association founded by George Williams. For many years he was the chief organiser of the Sunday afternoon devotional meeting held annually at the meeting of the British Association.

In 1850 Gladstone was appointed Lecturer in Chemistry to St. Thomas's Hospital, a post which he held for two years, and in June 1853, at the unusually young age of 26, he was elected a Fellow of the Royal Society. In 1864, he lost his wife, their eldest daughter, and only son. These tragedies, however, seem to have been followed by only a temporary suspension of social and scientific activity. In 1863–64, and again in 1866–68, he served on the Council of the Royal Society, and having been a member of the Royal Commission on Lighthouses, Buoys, and Beacons from 1859 to 1862, he became a member of the Gun Cotton Committee in 1864–68. In politics Gladstone was a Liberal, and on more than one occasion he was tempted to enter Parliament. In 1868, he unsuccessfully contested the borough of York.

In 1869, he married Margaret Thompson King, daughter of the late Rev. Dr. David King, and niece of Lord Kelvin. Margaret died in 1870, leaving one daughter, Margaret, who would become a social reformer and wife of Ramsay MacDonald.

During 1874–1877, Gladstone held the Fullerian Professorship of Chemistry at the Royal Institution, and was first President of the Physical Society, of which he was one of the founders. He was President of the Chemical Society during 1877–79, and in 1898 he was one of the six past presidents of that Society who had been Fellows for upwards of fifty years, and in whose honour a banquet was given under the chairmanship of the President, Professor James Dewar.

Gladstone was very fond of London and seems never to have wished to live out of the metropolis. He spoke French readily, and frequently attended the summer meetings of the Association Francaise pour l'Avancement des Sciences, and was also at one or two meetings of the Swiss Association.

In recognition of his services to education he was elected an Honorary Fellow of the College of Preceptors. He also received the degree Sc.D. at the celebration of the Tercentenary of Trinity College, Dublin, in 1892, and the Davy Medal from the Royal Society in 1897 "for his numerous contributions to chemical science, and especially for his important work in the application of optical methods to chemistry". In 1880 he became a member of the Company of Wheelwrights, and as a liveryman took part in the last year of his life in the election of the Lord Mayor, at the Guildhall, on Michaelmas Day.

On the day of his death, 6 October 1902, he presided in the afternoon at a meeting of the Christian Evidence Society, and, after walking part of the way home, was found lifeless in his study as the result of failure of the heart. He was buried in Kensal Green Cemetery.

== Research ==
In his early years, Gladstone conducted studies of phosphamide and similar compounds, suggested by Liebig and revised ten years later; an inquiry into the composition of nitrogen iodide (1852). His more important work was published in the Philosophical Transactions in 1855, on "Circumstances modifying the Action of chemical Affinity". Here, the author examined the question, arising out of the researches of Bunsen and Debus, whether when two substances act on each other an increase in the quantity of one of them leads to a corresponding increase in the amount of chemical change observed, and whether such change occurs continuously or discretely, in atomic proportions.

Optical phenomena and the properties of elements and compounds in relation to light have always been a major interest for Gladstone. This comes out quite early in his career, and in a variety of forms. Thus in 1854 he lectured at the Royal Institution on "Chromatic Phenomena exhibited by Transmitted Light." In 1855 there were "Notes on some substances which exhibit the Phenomena of Fluorescence", and in 1856 on "Some Dichromatic Phenomena among Solutions". In 1858 he drew attention to the use of the prism in qualitative analysis (Quart. Journ. Chem. Soc., 1O, 79), and discovered distinct lines in the absorption spectrum of didymium, a substance long afterwards resolved by Auer von Welsbach into the two elements known as praseodymium and neodymium. A little later he studied the absorption spectrum of the atmosphere, and found that the Fraunhofer lines varied according to the time of day, and that the change must be due to some constituents of the Earth's atmosphere. In this research he was joined by Sir David Brewster, and together they produced a paper on the lines of the solar spectrum in 1860. The most important work of Gladstone in this direction was the long series of observations on the refraction and dispersion of liquids, which originated with a study of the "Influence of Temperature on the Refraction of Light," (Phil. Trans., 1858) and followed by "Researches on the Refraction, Dispersion, and Sensitiveness of Liquids," (Phil. Trans., 1863), leading to the Gladstone–Dale relation (with Pelham Dale).

Another memorable series of researches commenced about 1872, in conjunction with his assistant Alfred Tribe, resulted in the discovery of the zinc-copper couple, and its application to the production of the organozinc compounds and to other purposes. The couple has long since found its way into every laboratory in the world, and as a reducing agent has met with applications not only in connection with carbon compounds but for many purposes in analysis.
