= James Allen Shuffrey =

English artist (1858 – 1939)

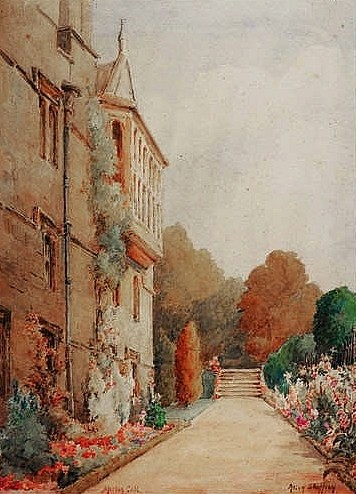
Watercolour of Merton College, Oxford, by James Allen Shuffrey

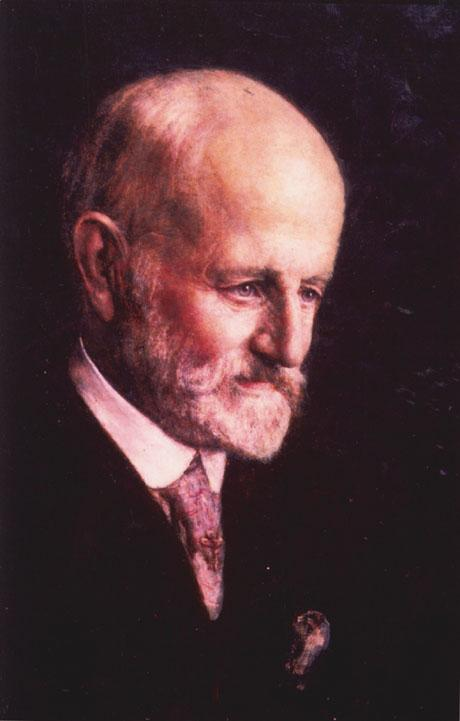
James Allen Shuffrey

James Allen Shuffrey (1858–1939) was a British Victorian and Edwardian watercolour artist particularly associated with Oxford and Oxfordshire.

== Early life and family ==
James Allen Shuffrey was born in 1859 in Wood Green, Witney, Oxfordshire, into an old Wood Green family of blanket weavers and tanners of Huguenot origin who had lived at 7 Narrow Hill since the early eighteenth century. His parents were Samuel Shuffrey (1810-1889) and Sarah Shuffrey, nee Baylis (1819-1875). Shuffrey was one of seven children, and was the younger brother of the leading architect and architectural designer Leonard Shuffrey, whose son, Paul Shuffrey became a distinguished colonial administrator and editor. Their cousin, William Shuffrey (1851-1932), became Vicar of Arncliffe and Honorary Canon of Ripon Cathedral.

As a child, Shuffrey sang in the Choir of Holy Trinity Church, Wood Green. Shuffrey married twice and had three children by his first wife, Reginald, Barbara and Dora. Reginald became an artist, particularly well known for his illustrations of transport subjects. James Allen Shuffrey's youngest grandson was the artist David Lublinski.

== Career ==
From 1877, Shuffrey worked as a bank clerk for the London County Bank in Abingdon, Arundel and Petersfield. In 1902 he moved to Oxford and took up painting full time. He was among the first members of the British Watercolour Society, and became a member of the Oxford Art Society. He and is particularly noted for his paintings of nineteenth and early twentieth-century Oxford.

Shuffrey also made painting trips to all parts of Britain and one to Germany. Many of his paintings and drawings (gifted originally by the artist himself in 1934) are held by Oxfordshire County Council and are regularly exhibited in the Oxfordshire Museum in Woodstock.

Shuffrey's place of birth in Wood Green, Witney, is marked by an Oxfordshire Blue Plaque Scheme plaque, installed in 2008. Holy Trinity Church, Wood Green contains a pulpit and chancel screen dedicated in 1909 to Shuffrey's parents, and created in the Wood Green workshop of James Allen Shuffrey's brother Leonard Shuffrey.

== External Sources ==
- James Allen Shuffrey's grave record at Wolvercote Cemetery, Oxford (on an unmoderated site):FindaGrave: James Allen Shuffrey
