= George Prynne =

George Prynne may refer to:

- George Fellowes Prynne (1853–1927), English architect
- George Rundle Prynne (1818–1903), English Anglo-Catholic cleric
