= St Saviour's Church, Ealing =

Listed building in London, England

St Saviour's Church was a late-Victorian Church of England church in the London Borough of Ealing, designed by the architect George Fellowes Prynne and destroyed during the Second World War.

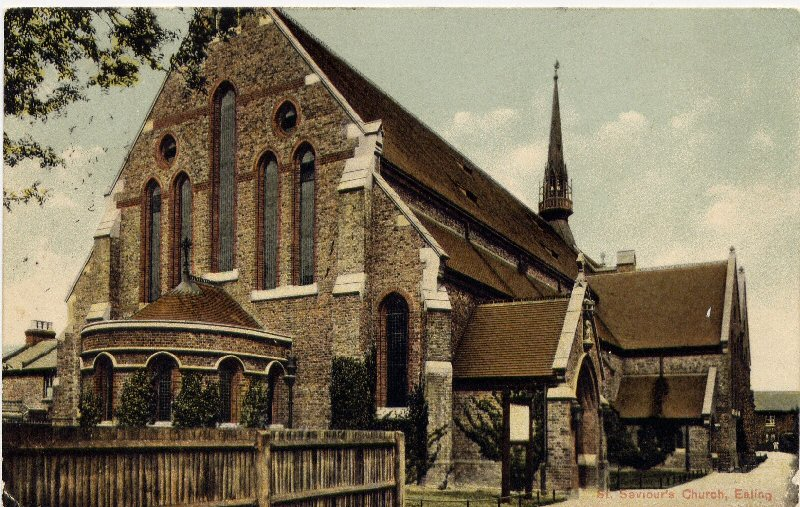
The east end of St Saviour's, Ealing

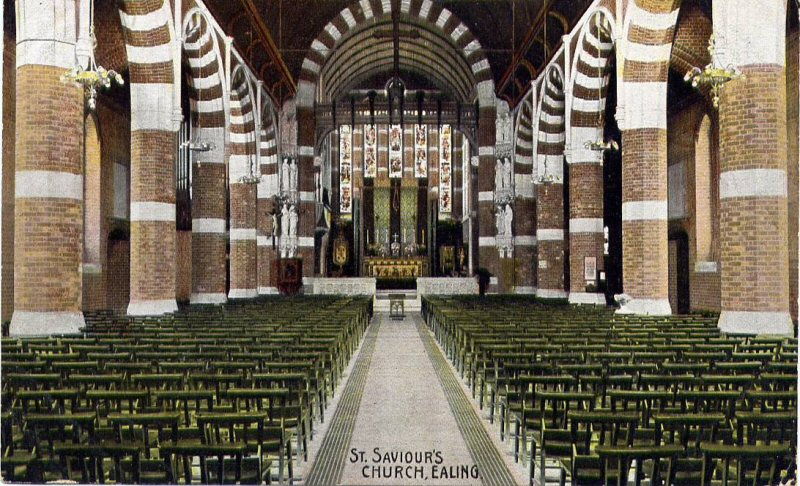
St Saviour's Church, Ealing, showing the nave

St Saviour's was built as mission church of Christ the Saviour, Church Ealing. The Rector of Christ the Saviour raised funds for four daughter churches; St John's Church, Ealing, St Stephen's Church, Ealing, St Peter's Church, Ealing, and St Saviour's. The prolific church architect, George Fellowes Prynne, was chosen to build the new Church. Prynne had designed and restored churches across the country, particularly in London and the South West. He also lived in Ealing on the adjoining Street, and attended Christ Church. The project was of substantial personal significance to him.

Construction work commenced in 1897 and the building was consecrated in June 1899. The Church was a brick building with stone dressings, and had a chancel, aisled nave and baptistery. Internally, the church had many of the features associated with George Fellowes Prynne. This included red brick contrasting with white stonework, which was used to distinctive effect in the nave and at the chancel arch. A stone chancel wall divided the nave from the chancel, and there was an elaborate sanctuary and high altar. The altar front had painted panels believed to be the work of Edward Arthur Fellowes Prynne, the notable late Pre-Raphaelite artist, and the architect's brother, who also lived in Ealing.

The church was set back from the street frontage on a large plot of land. Completed in 1909, a Clergy House, was built, also by George Fellowes Prynne on the street front. The Clergy House doubled as a gatehouse to the Church. It was occupied by a vicar, the parish clergy, and three servants.

After the Church's opening, George Fellowes Prynne became heavily involved in the life of the Parish until his death in 1927. 13 years later, in 1940, the church was bombed during World War Two and was later demolished. Services were held in the Church Hall until the Church took the decision in 1951 to reunite with Christ Church, Ealing.

The Clergy House was designated as Grade II listed by Historic England in 2014.
