= Holy Cross Church, Newton Ferrers =

Church in Devon, England

Holy Cross Church
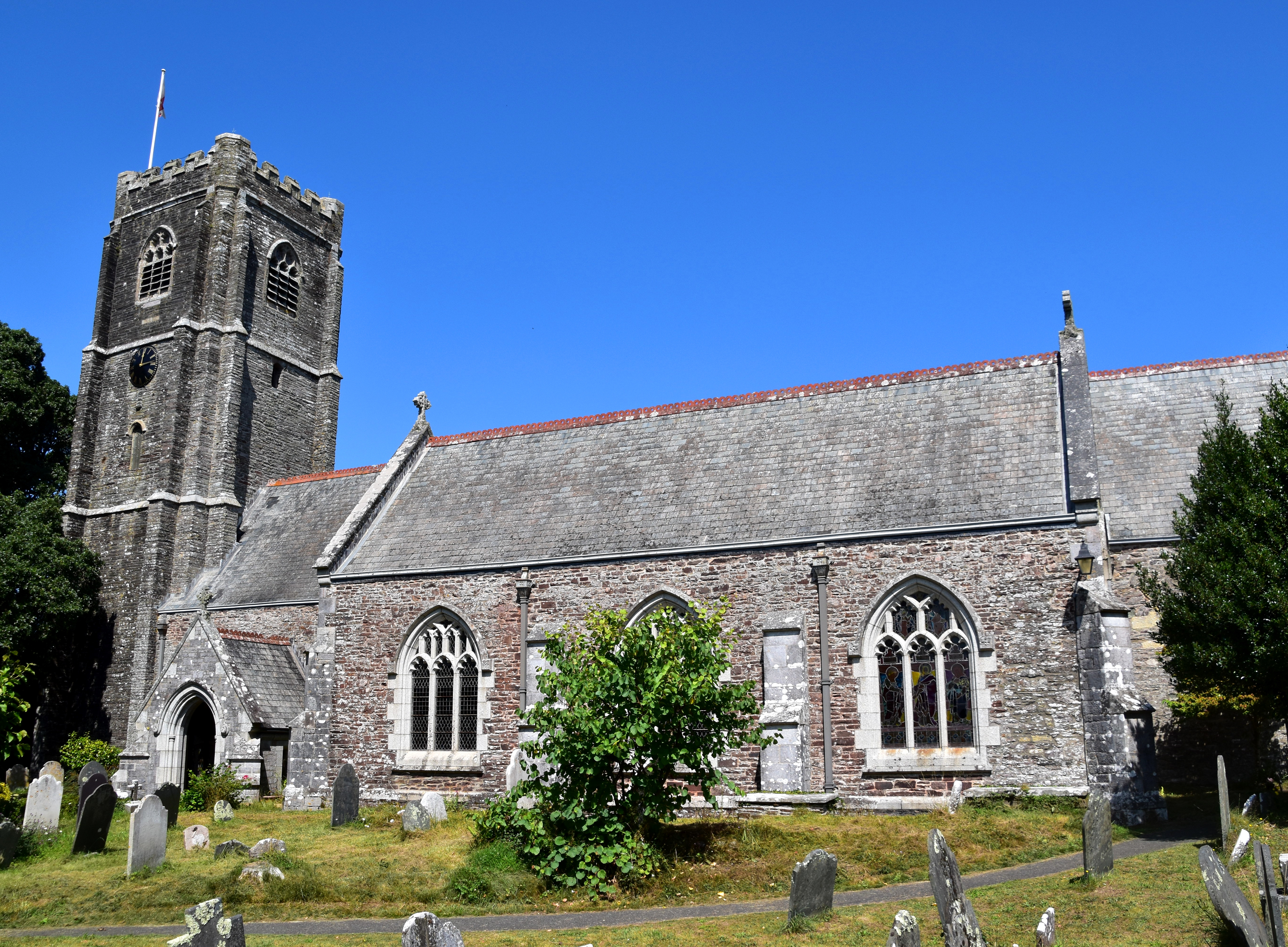

Religion
- Affiliation: Church of England
- Ecclesiastical or organizational status: Active

Location
- Location: Newton Ferrers, Devon, England
- Interactive map of Holy Cross Church
- Coordinates: 50.3154°N 4.0376°W

Architecture
- Type: Church

Holy Cross Church is a Church of England parish church in Newton Ferrers, Devon, England. The existing church has 13th-century origins, with a major restoration and rebuild of 1885–86. Holy Cross has been a Grade I listed building since 1960.

== History ==
A church has been in existence at Newton Ferrers since at least 1084, when a church dedicated to St Mary's was recorded in the Saxon Geld Roll. The church was rebuilt by the Ferrers family in the early 12th-century. It was rebuilt again in 1260 and later enlarged by the rector, Rev. Henry de Ferrers, in 1342. Further alterations and enlargement took place in 1460, including the addition of the aisles and tower.

The church underwent a £3,500 restoration in 1885–86 to the design of George Fellowes Prynne. Owing to its dilapidated condition, much of the church was rebuilt. Messrs. Stevenson and son of Newton Ferrers carried out the restoration, with Mr. F. M. Rowse as clerk of the works. Both Prynne and his father, the Rev. George Rundle Prynne, were also involved in supervising the restoration. Many of the new fittings, including the font, pulpit, parclose screens, litany desk and credence table were made by Harry Hems of Exeter. He also carved the bosses in the church's oak wagon roof. The church was reopened by the Bishop of Exeter, the Right Rev. Edward Bickersteth, on 23 February 1886. The restoration left only the west tower and the north and south arcades to retain their medieval structure.

== Architecture ==
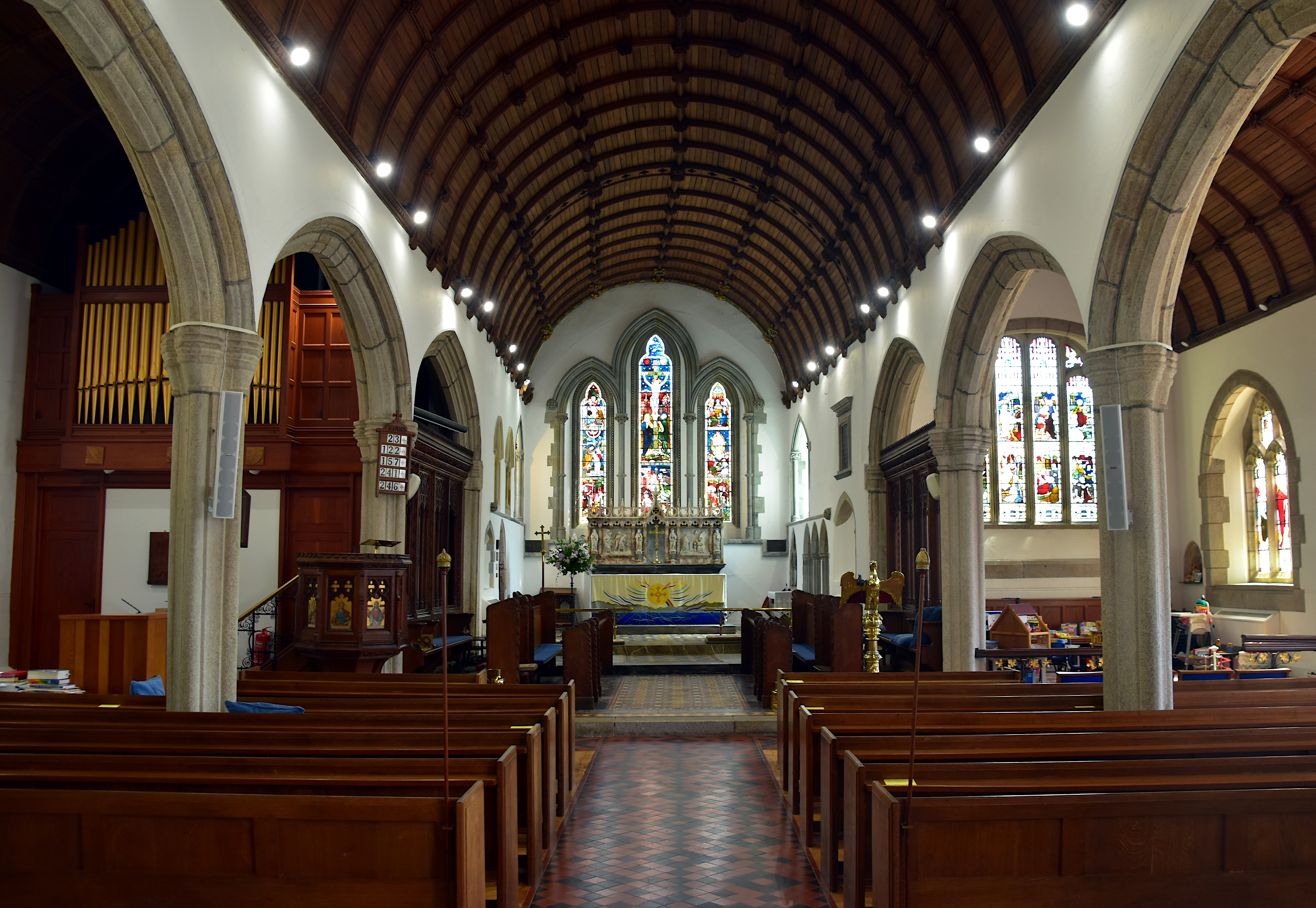
Interior of Holy Cross Church.

Holy Cross is built of stone rubble with freestone dressings and slate roofs. It is made up of a nave, north and south aisles, chancel, vestry, south porch and west three-stage tower. Many of the 1885–86 windows are in the Perpendicular style. The chancel's south window dates to the 15th-century and the north window to the 13th-century. The church contains a double piscina and triple sedilia, both of which are dated to the 13th or 14th-centuries.

== Churchyard ==
The churchyard was enlarged in 1884, when the rector, Rev. S. H. Archer, with assistance from his family, purchased a large plot of land on the north side of the existing grounds as a memorial to his late wife. The Bishop of Exeter, the Right Rev. Frederick Temple, consecrated the new ground on 27 October 1884.
