= St Andrew's Church, Ashburton =

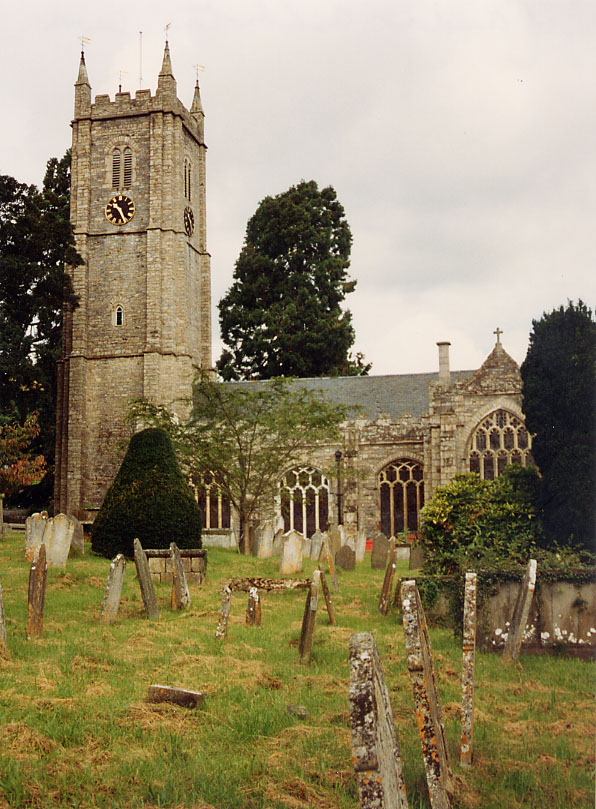
- St Andrew's Church in 1993

- Location within Devon
- 50.5144°N 3.757°W
- OS grid reference: SX 75526 69760
- Country: England
- Denomination: Church of England

History
- Status: Operational
- Dedication: St Andrew

Architecture
- Heritage designation: Grade I listed
- Architect: George Edmund Street
- Style: Gothic
- Years built: 15th century with 19th century restoration

Specifications
- Materials: Stone rubble, granite, limestone

Administration
- Province: Canterbury
- Diocese: Exeter
- Parish: Ashburton, Devon

St Andrew's Church in Ashburton, Devon, is a parish church in the Church of England. It is a Grade I listed building.

== History ==
The earliest records of a church on the site date back to the late 12th century.

The present church is of early or mid 15th century construction, mostly of stone rubble with granite and limestone, the tower having been built before 1449.

Restorations were carried out by the famed Gothic Revival architect George Edmund Street in 1882–3.

The pulpit was made by Harry Hems, the organ case by George Fellowes Prynne.

In 2024, the church suffered a burglary which caused damage to one of the stained glass windows.

== Current day ==
The church hosts a number of community groups and events.

The church is registered with the Charity Commission for England and Wales.
