= St John the Evangelist Church, Oxford =

Church in Oxford, England

Coordinates: 51°44′48″N 1°14′24″W

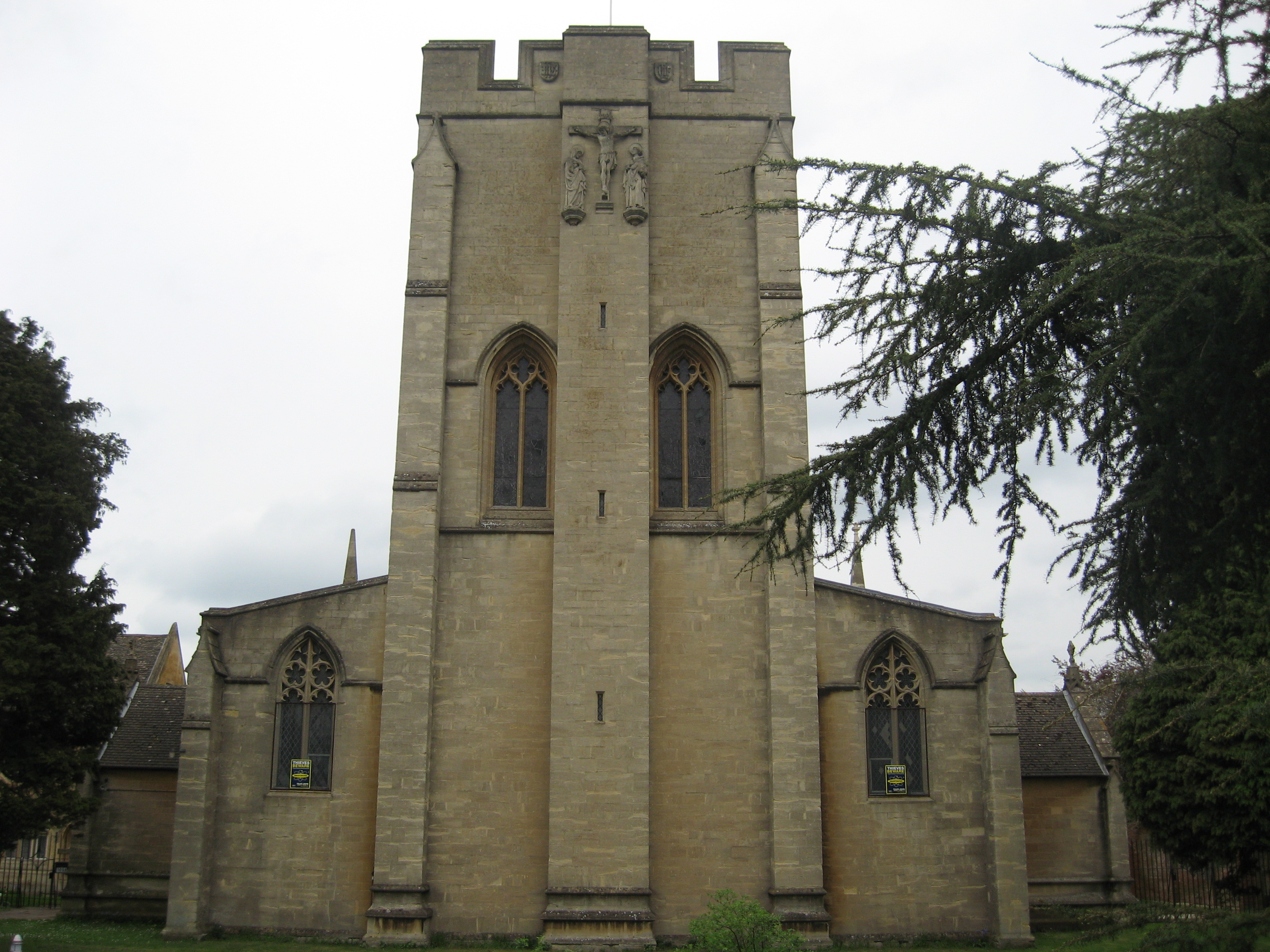
St John the Evangelist Church, Oxford

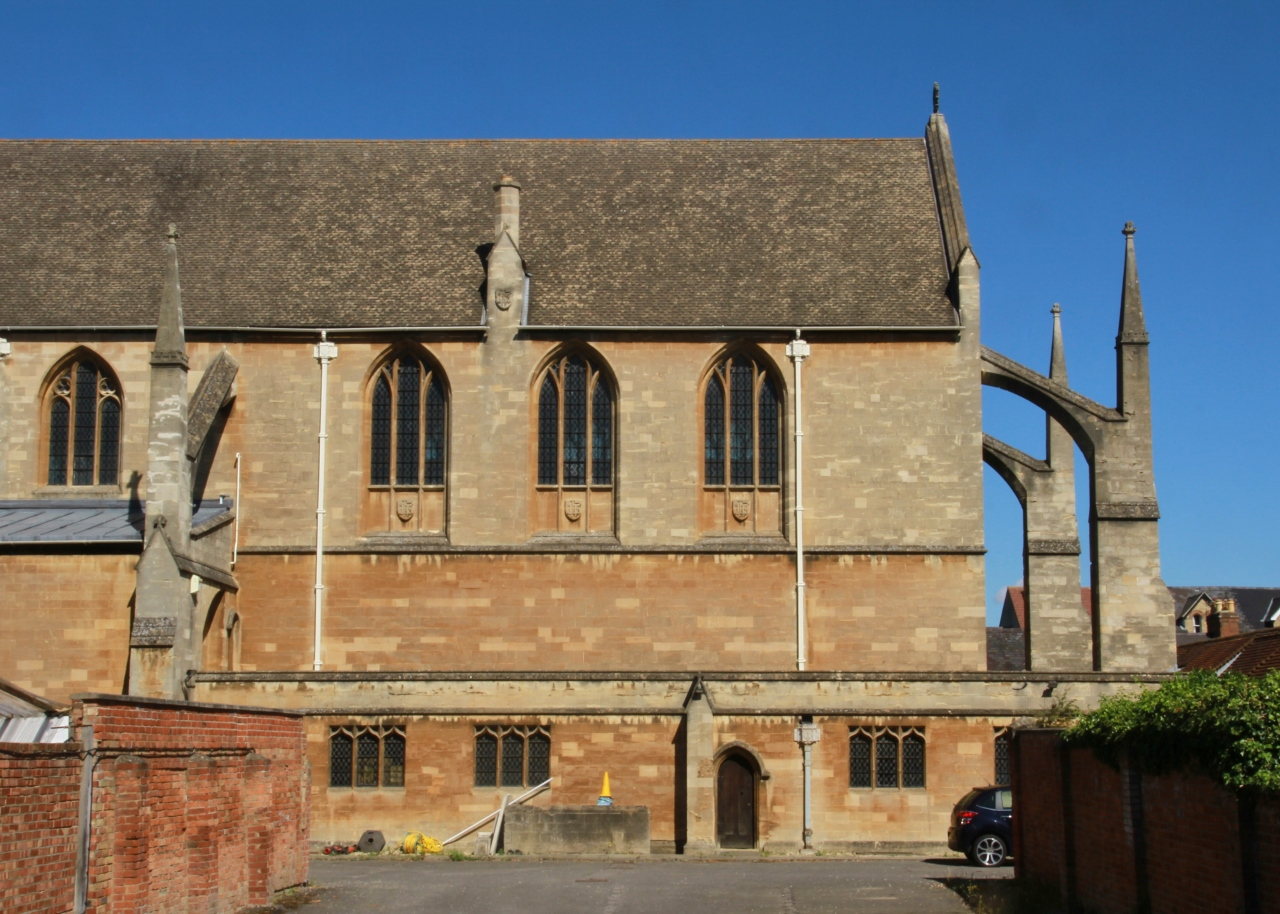
The south chancel of the church

St John the Evangelist Church is a non-parochial church on Iffley Road in Oxford, England. It was built as the community church of the mother house of the Anglican religious order known as the Society of St. John the Evangelist (SSJE, aka the Cowley Fathers). Since 1980 it has served also as one of the college chapels of St Stephen's House, Oxford.

The building was designed by G. F. Bodley (1827–1907) predominantly in a Decorated Gothic style and built in 1894–96. Its aisles and chancel have pinnacled flying buttresses. The castellated west tower was added in 1902. The east, west and north-east windows contain stained glass designed by C. E. Kempe (1837–1907) and made in about 1900.

The Church contains a set of Stations of the Cross, by the leading late Pre-Raphaelite artist Edward Arthur Fellowes Prynne. Representing the pinnacle of his painted devotional work, Prynne thought that the Church “afforded a unique opportunity by reason of the splendid wall-space" and regarded the commission as “a very great pleasure and high privilege." The striking – although not unproblematic – set of images was finally installed in the Church in 1921. The painting of "Jesus Christ Condemned to Death” was based on an earlier picture by the artist painted in 1898, and now held by St Peter's Church, Ealing.

In 1980, the Society of St John the Evangelist prepared to close its Oxford chapter and relocate all its activities to St Edward's House, in London. At that time, St Stephen's House moved from its buildings in Norham Gardens to the monastic buildings of the SSJE, which were well-suited for a theological college. The SSJE's buildings included the Mission House on Marston Street, St John the Evangelist Church, and the extension to the Mission House that connected the earlier building to the chapel and to the church with a refectory and cloister. The church's architect G. F. Bodley also worked on the adjoining cloisters, college buildings, chapel, and old mission house. The Sunday Mass is celebrated in the church during Oxford's academic year.

St John the Evangelist Church is a listed building which underwent some refurbishment and restoration in 2008, including the provision of underfloor heating. From 2012 until 2025 SJE Arts Oxford ran musical and arts events in the church.

The church is opposite the Roger Bannister running track. When Roger Bannister (1929–2018) ran the first ever sub-four-minute mile at the track on 6 May 1954, he used the St George's Flag on top of the church tower to determine that the wind was low enough to make an attempt on this record.

== See also ==
- List of churches in Oxford

== Sources ==
- Sherwood, Jennifer; Pevsner, Nikolaus (1974). Oxfordshire. The Buildings of England. Harmondsworth: Penguin Books. pp. 340–341. ISBN 0-14-071045-0.
