= Christ the Saviour Church, Ealing =

Coordinates: 51.5135°N 0.305°W

Christ the Saviour Church
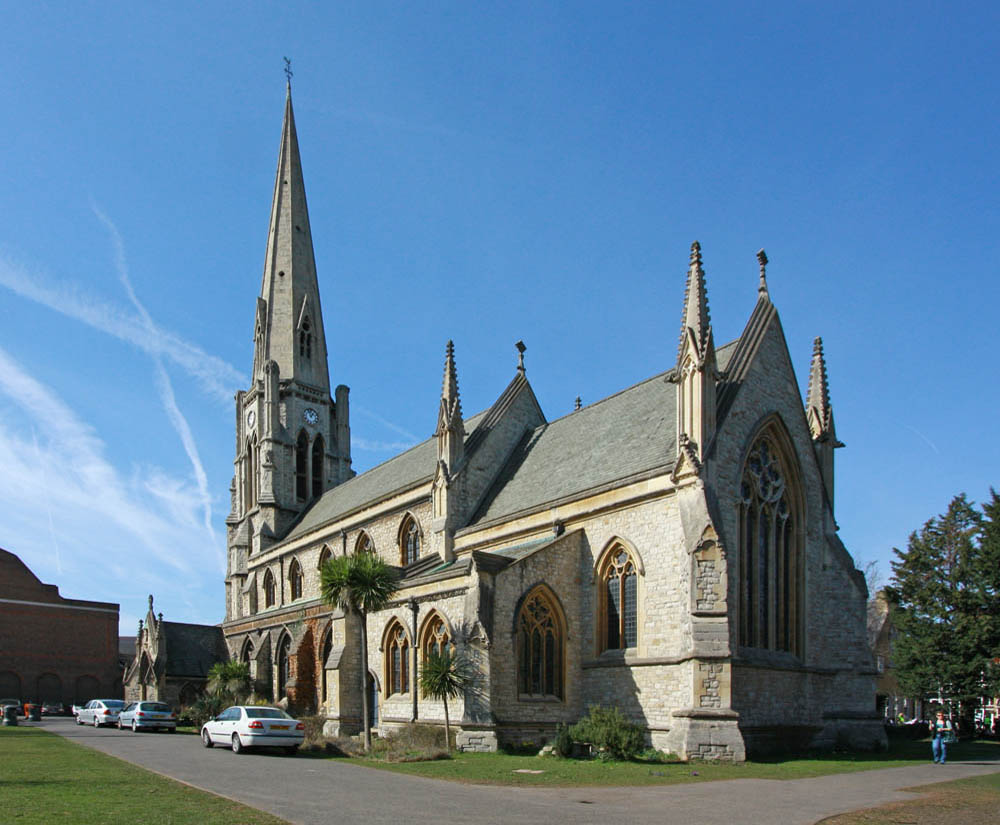
- Christ the Saviour Church
- Location: Ealing
- Country: England
- Denomination: Anglican
- Website: ChristtheSaviour.com

History
- Former name: Christ Church
- Status: Parish church
- Dedication: Christ the King
- Consecrated: 30 June 1852

Architecture
- Functional status: Active
- Heritage designation: Grade II*
- Designated: 24 February 1950
- Architect: George Gilbert Scott
- Style: Gothic revival
- Groundbreaking: 1850
- Completed: 1852

Administration
- Province: Canterbury
- Diocese: London
- Archdeaconry: Northolt
- Deanery: Ealing
- Parish: Christ the Saviour

Christ the Saviour Church, formerly Christ Church, is a Church of England parish church on Ealing Broadway, in the centre of Ealing, London. It was built from 1850 to 1852 and designed by George Gilbert Scott. Architecturally, it is in the Gothic Revival style. Parts of the church were designed by George Frederick Bodley. It is a Grade II* listed building.

== Building ==
In 1850, construction work on the church started. It was paid for by a Miss Rosa Frances Lewis, who continued to support the church after its construction and until her death in 1862. The architect commissioned to design the church was George Gilbert Scott. In 1852, the church was finished and on 30 June 1852, the church was consecrated. It was originally called Christ Church. From 1903 to 1908, the church was redecorated by George Frederick Bodley. After the church was damaged during the Second World War, repair was done on it from 1946 to 1952. In 2016, the church tower was repaired. In 2020, the church received a grant to repair the roof.

== Parish ==
After the construction of Christ Church was completed, with the expanding population of Ealing, daughter churches were started from it. In 1865, St John's Church, Ealing started as a mission church. It was built in 1876, but burned down in 1920 and rebuilt in 1923. In 1867, St Stephen's Church, Ealing also started as a mission church, in a temporary structure, before being built in 1876. In 1881, St Saviour's Church, Ealing started, also from Christ Church. In 1882, St Peter's Church, Ealing was founded. From 1895 to 1929, the vicar at Christ Church was a W. Templeton King. He started to move the church in a more Anglo-Catholic direction. In 1940, St Saviour's Church was destroyed by a bomb in World War II. As a result, its church congregation met in its hall, and called themselves Little St Saviour's. In 1951, St Saviour's Church was demolished and the congregation joined with its mother church, Christ Church, and to reflect the merger, Christ Church was renamed Christ the Saviour Church. According to the church, its feast day is Christ the King, and the "largest Church of England Primary School in London" is situated next to the church. It is open from 9:00 am to 5:00 pm from April to October and 9:00 am to 4:00 pm from November to March.

== Interior ==
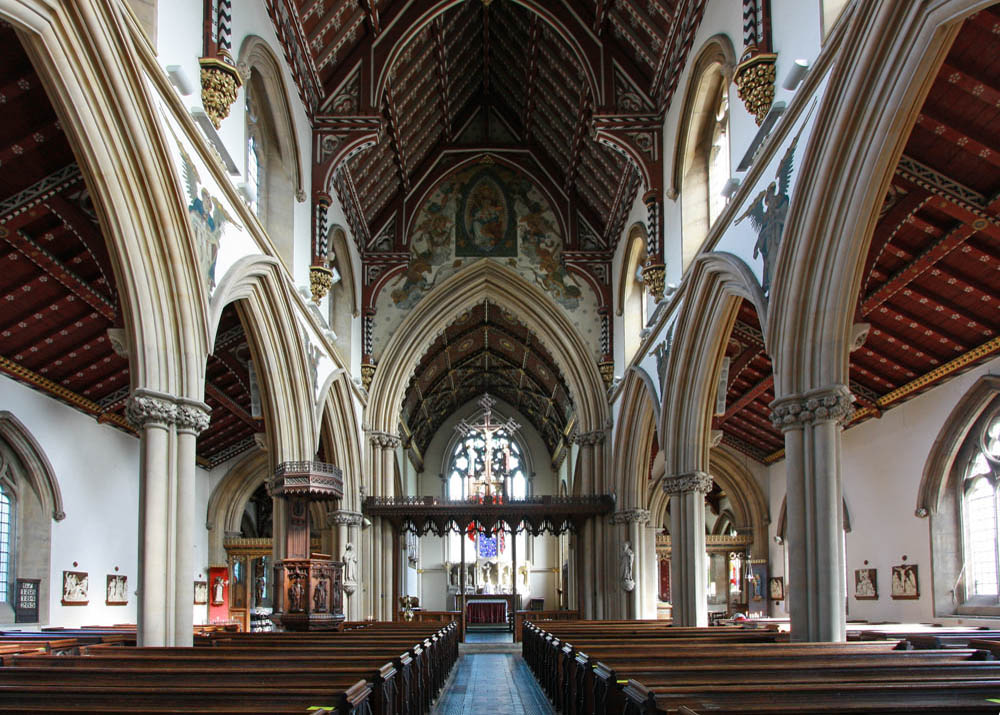
East end

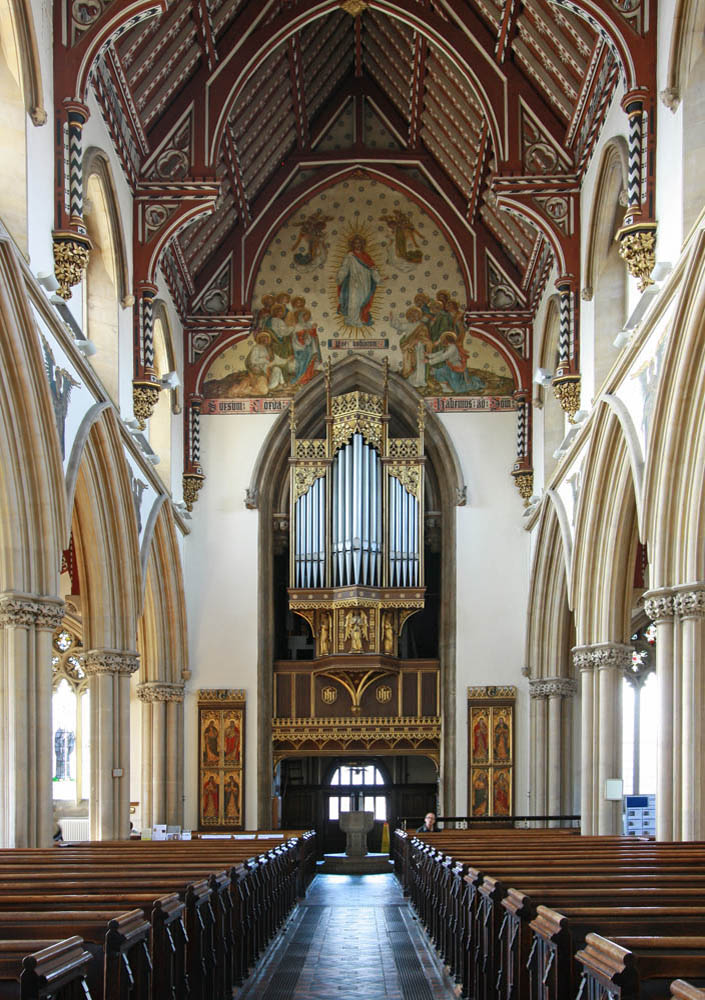
West end

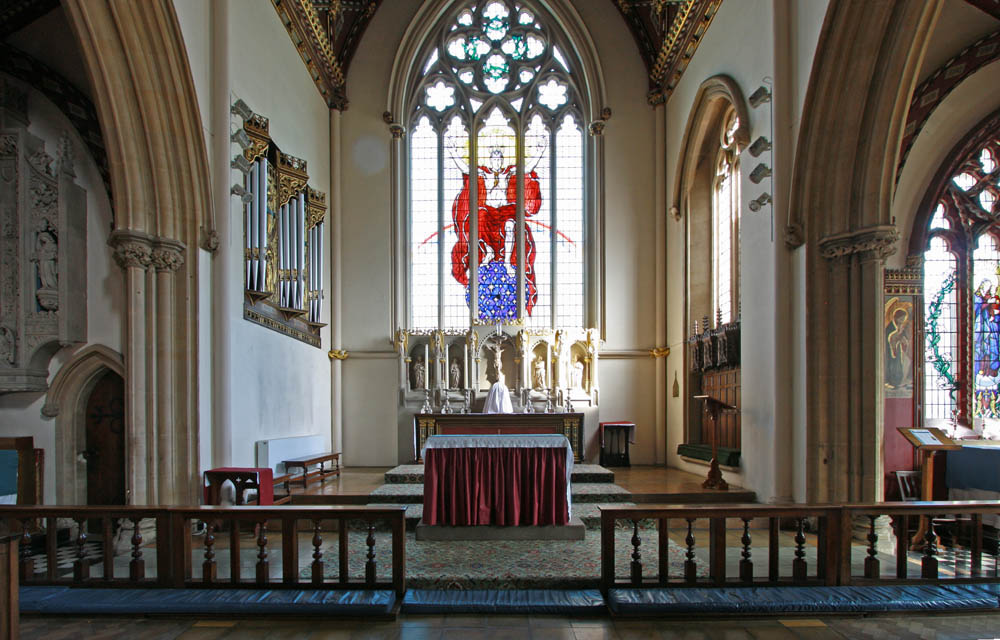
Sanctuary

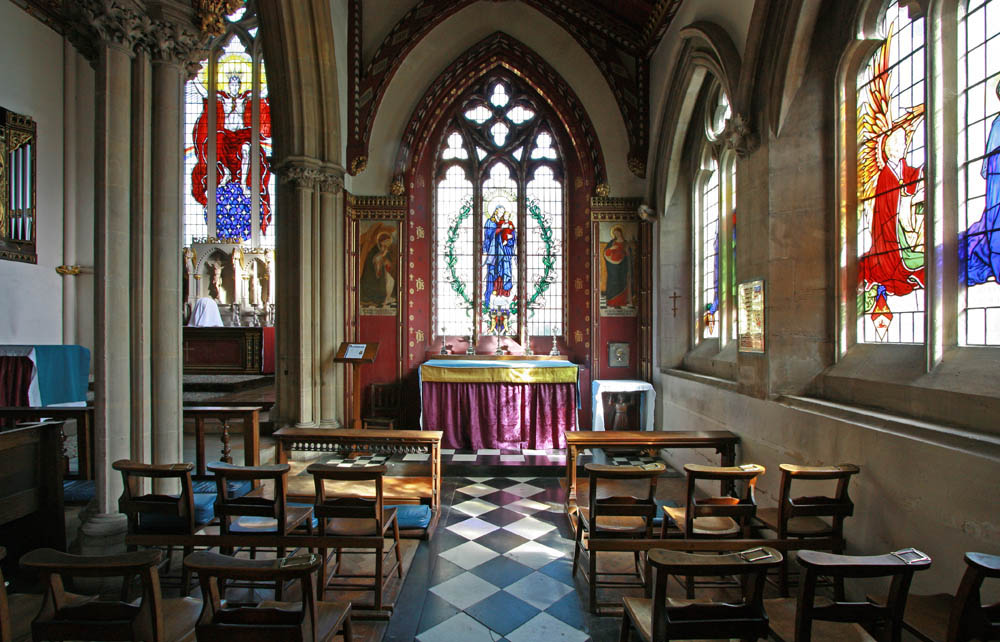
South chapel

== See also ==
- Diocese of London
