= Edward Arthur Fellowes Prynne =

British painter

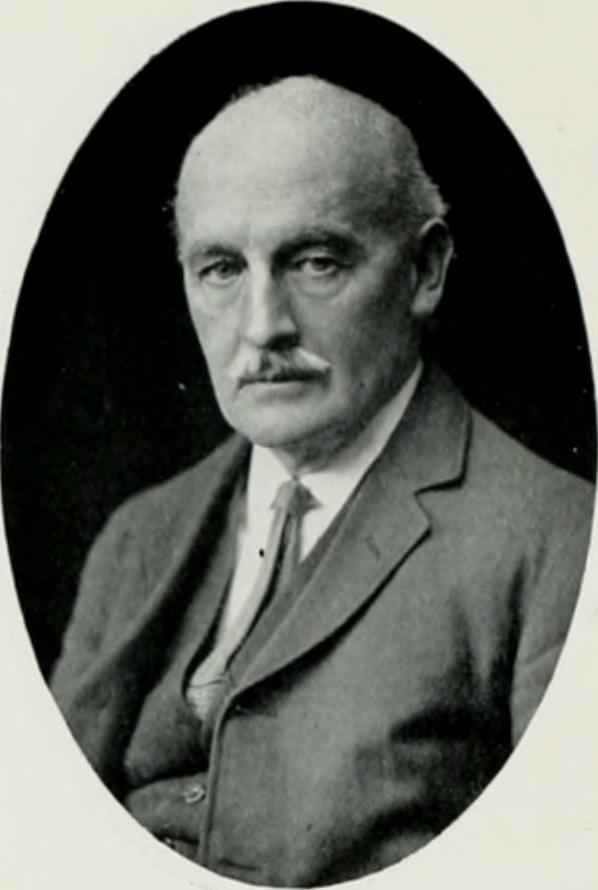
- Born: 14 October 1854; Plymouth, Devon, England
- Died: 28 December 1921 (aged 67); Ealing, Middlesex, England
- Resting place: St Mary the Virgin Church, Hayes
- Notable work: Figurative painting
- Movement: Pre-Raphaelite
- Spouse: Emma Mary Joll
- Children: 5
- Father: George Rundle Prynne
- Relatives: George Fellowes Prynne (brother)
- Memorials: St Peter's Church, Ealing

Edward Arthur Fellowes Prynne (1854–1921) was a leading British painter of portraits and subject pictures, who in later life became one of the country's best-known creators of decorative art for churches.

== Family and early life ==
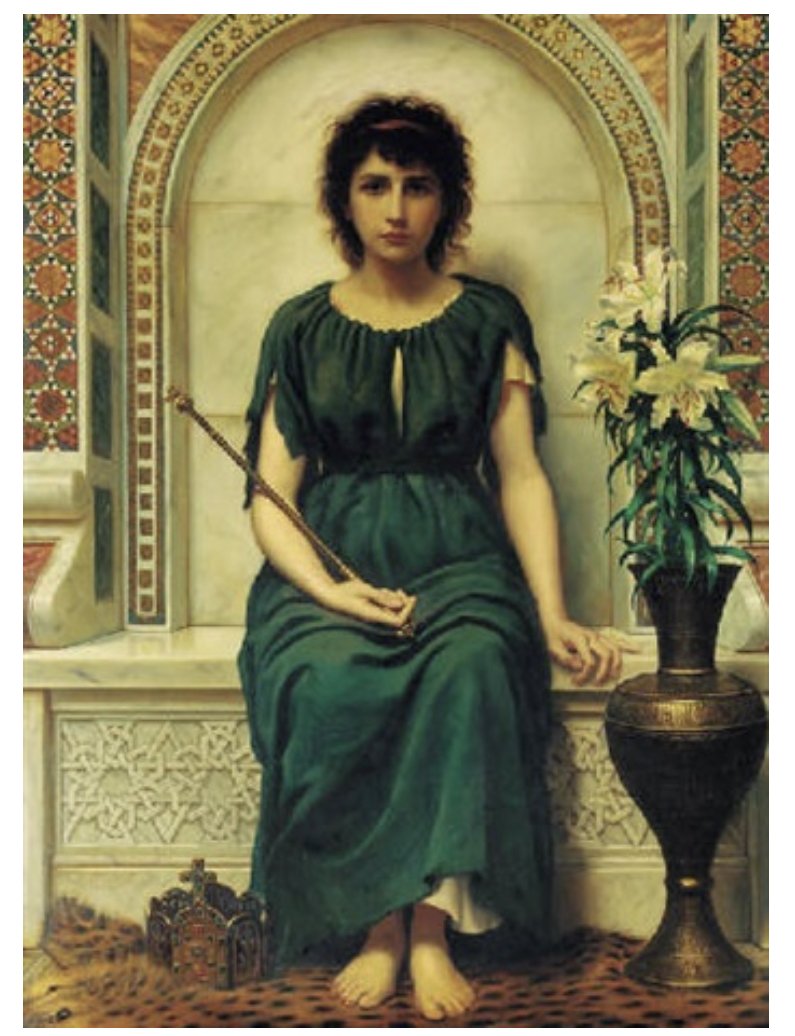
'Enthroned' by Edward Arthur Fellowes Prynne (1889)

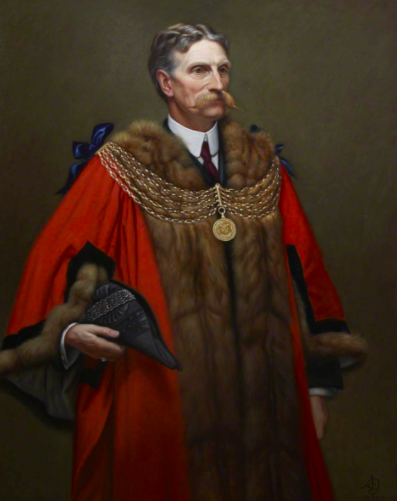
Portrait of John F. Winnicott by Edward Arthur Fellowes Prynne, from the collection of The Box (Plymouth City Council)

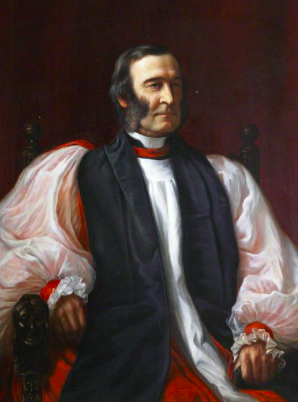
Portrait of Frederick Temple, Bishop of Exeter, later Archbishop of Canterbury, by Edward Arthur Fellowes Prynne (1886), from the collection of the Bishop's Palace, Exeter

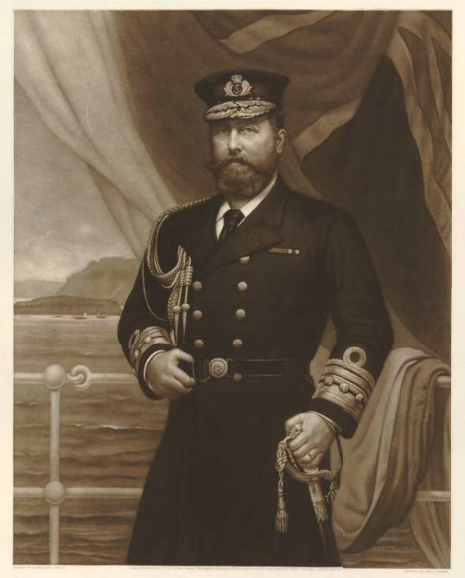
Print of a portrait of the Duke of Edinburgh, Alfred, Duke of Saxe-Coburg and Gotha, second son of Queen Victoria, by Edward Arthur Fellowes Prynne, from the collection of the British Museum

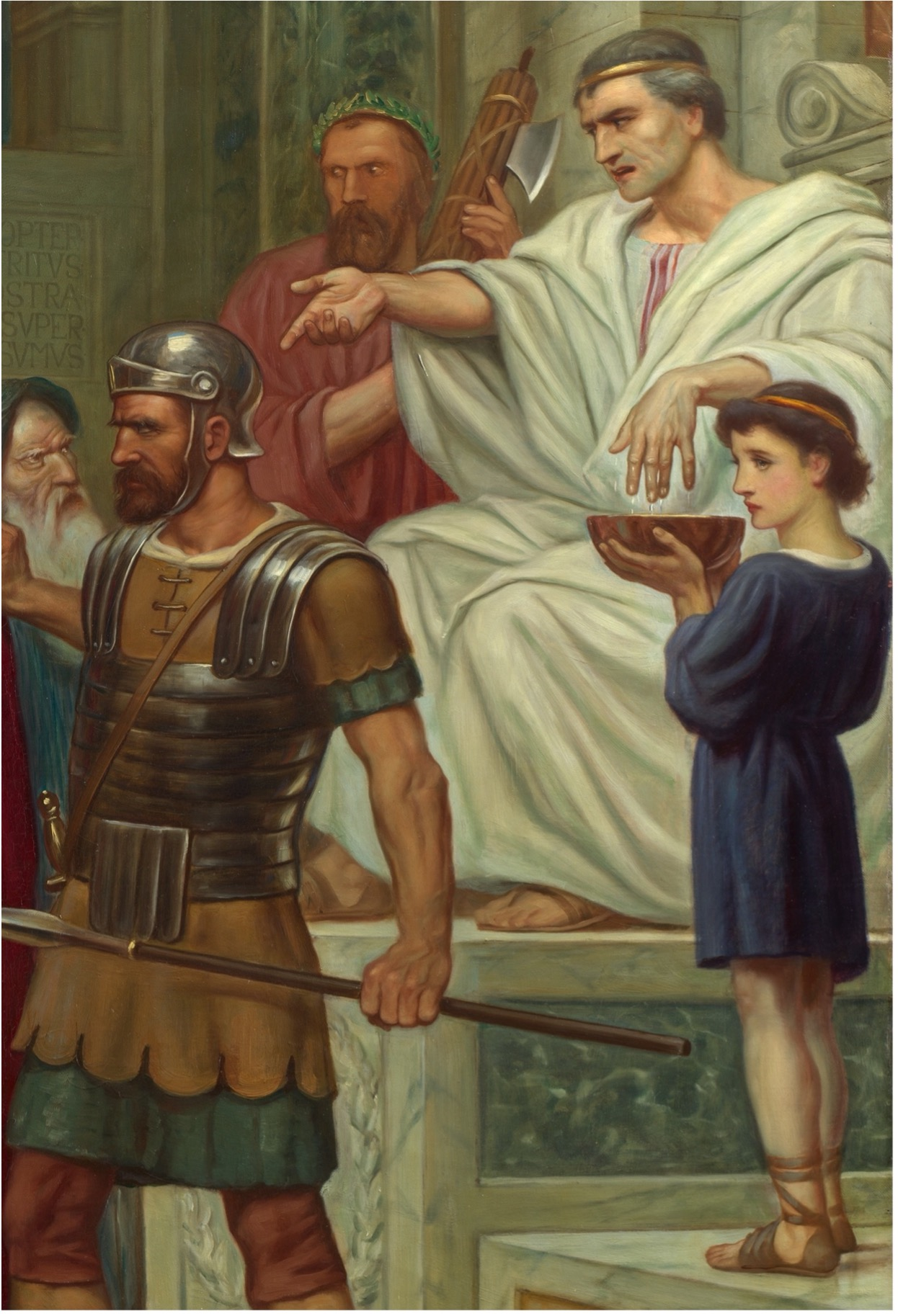
Detail from Edward Arthur Fellowes Prynne's painting 'Christ Before Pilate' at St Peter's Church, Ealing

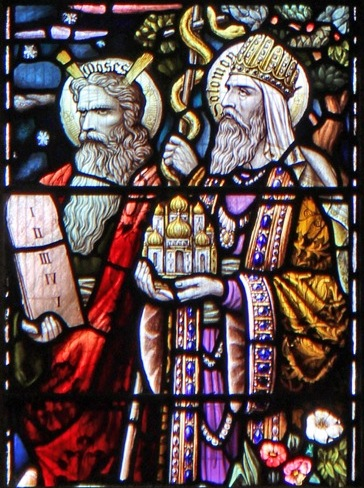
Stained-glass at St Peter's Church, Staines, by Edward Arthur Fellowes Prynne, depicting Moses and King Solomon

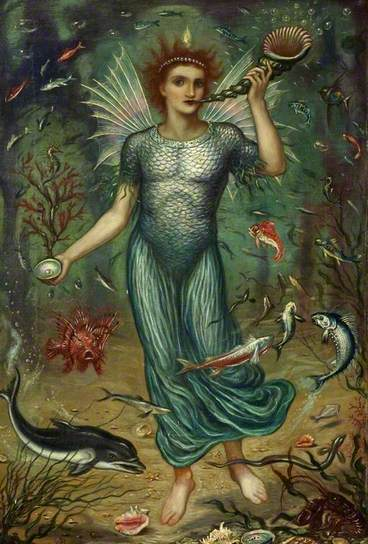
'O ye whales and all that move on the waters bless ye the Lord' by Edward Arthur Fellowes Prynne (1899), a panel from a reredos in the collect of Russell-Cotes Art Gallery & Museum

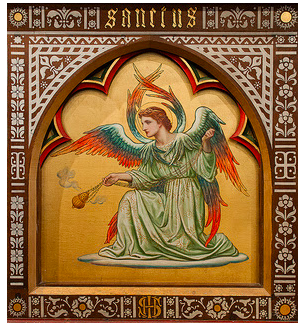
Detail from a painted altar front at St Ladoca's Church, Ladock, Cornwall, by Edward Arthur Fellowes Prynne

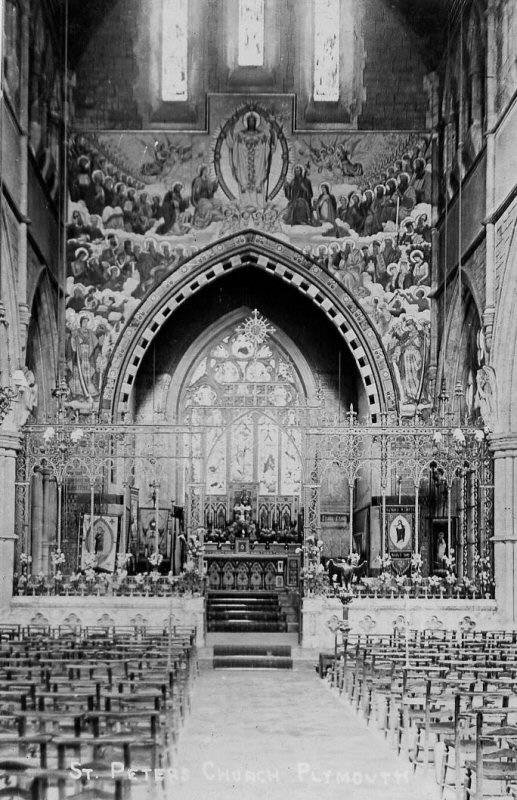
Prynne's extraordinary mural (now destroyed) at St Peter's Church, Plymouth, in memory of his father

Born in Plymouth on 14 October 1854, Prynne was the third son of Emily Fellowes (daughter of Admiral Sir Thomas Fellowes KCB DCL), and the Cornish Tractarian and ritualist cleric George Rundle Prynne. The church architect George Fellowes Prynne was his elder brother.

Prynne attended St Mary's College in Harlow, founded in 1852 by the Anglo-Catholic cleric Charles Jonathan Goulden, from 1855 a member of the Society of the Holy Cross. He was later at Eastman's Royal Naval Academy, intended for the Royal Navy. At the suggestion of Frederic Leighton, however, he decided to embark on an artistic career. After preliminary training in art schools in London, he travelled to Antwerp, where he studied with the Belgian painter Charles Verlat. Subsequent study was undertaken in Florence, Paris and Rome.

Prynne married Emma Mary Joll in 1888, with whom he had two sons and three daughters: Beatrice Mary Fellowes Prynne (1893–1993), Dorothy Etheldreda Prynne (1894–1983), George Michael Fellowes Prynne (1896–1973), Stella Christine Marie Prynne (1898–1957) and John Rundle Fellowes Prynne (1903–1931). On moving to London in the 1880s, he lived at 8 Avonmore Road in Kensington Olympia (later home of the author Gavin Maxwell). He subsequently lived for over 20 years at 1 Woodville Road in Ealing. Prynne and his family became part of the community of artists living in Ealing. He was a member of Ealing Art Group, and was present at their first meeting in 1911. Prynne and his family attended St Peter's Church, Ealing.

== Work ==
Prynne's early paintings showed a clear debt to his teacher Charles Verlat. Soon after his return from the continent, however, the artist fell under the influence of the Pre-Raphaelite school of painting, which he admired.

Prynne painted over 60 portraits, including a commission to paint a life-size portrait of the Duke of Edinburgh, as Admiral of the Fleet. By command of Queen Victoria, he attended Osborne House to show this portrait, which was later hung in the Royal Naval Barracks at Devonport. Prynne also painted mythological and religious pictures. Notable among these were Cophetua's Queen, Orpheus and Eurydice, Pan and Syrinx, and Silent Voices of the Studio.

== Religious work ==
Prynne shared the ardent Anglo Catholic faith of his father and brother, George Fellowes Prynne. He is principally celebrated for his religious art, which was commissioned and purchased for churches across the county – particularly in Devon and Cornwall. In many instances, Prynne's painted altar and reredos panels and stained-glass grace the churches designed and restored by his brother.

One of Prynne's most striking and original works is his altar piece, 'Benedicite Domino Laudate Et Superexaltate Eum in Saecula', which includes five painted panels illustrating separate lines from the canticle of creation. Here Prynne's mythological and religious worlds combine, notably in the panel depicting a sub-marine angel garbed in scales and delicate fish fin wings. The piece was shown in the Royal Society of British Artists 114th Exhibition in 1896; a reviewer commenting, 'Mr. E. A. Fellowes Prynne shows an altar-piece, "Benedicite," rich in colour and the artist's mannerisms'. Other artists highlighted for praise by the otherwise unimpressed reviewer included W. Graham Robertson, William Luker, and Tom Robertson.

Prynne's painting 'Magnificat,' appeared in 1894 in the New Gallery on Regents Street, London. Other exhibits included 'Love among the Ruins' by Edward Burne-Jones, as well as work by work by Lawrence Alma-Tadema, George Frederic Watts, Leonard Leslie Brooke, Charles Edward Hallé, Edward Matthew Hale, Walter Crane, William Laidlay, John Roddam Spencer Stanhope, George Hitchcock, Frank William Brangwyn, Andrew Brown Donaldson, George Henry Boughton, Arthur Lemon, George Howard, 9th Earl of Carlisle, Edward Poynter, William Llewellyn (painter), William Logsdail, Philip Norman (artist), Clara Montalba, William Wontner and George Frampton. 'Magnificat' also appeared at the L'Exposition Internationale du Bruxelles in 1897, where it was thought by a reviewer to be 'an exquisite conception'.

Prynne's 'Ecce Ancilla Domini,' painted during the same year, was praised for its beauty, delicacy and composition. It was displayed at the Royal Society of British Artists exhibition in 1895. Both of these pictures were presented by Mr. C. Lang Huggins to St Mark's Church, Hadlow Down, Sussex.

'The Desire of all Nations', a depiction if the nativity is amongst Prynne's chief works and became extremely well-known. It was exhibited at the Royal Academy in 1895, the reviewer in The Antiquary magazine noting that the painting would be suitable for display in a church setting. Such was the picture's destiny, for it was purchased by the Rev. Harry Wilson for St. Augustine's Church, Stepney, together with a set of Prynne's Stations of the Cross.

The copyrights of both the 'Magnificat' and 'The Desire of all Nations' were purchased by the Berlin Photographic Company in 1896, and subsequently reproduced in photogravure and widely circulated in all parts of the world. The paintings were included in a Berlin Photographic Company 'Catalogue of Select Publications' in 1906.

'Christ before Pilate,' 'Christ's Entry into Jerusalem,' and 'St. Joseph's Dream,' are also amongst his most accomplished pictures. The first, painted in 1898, was exhibited in Paris, Berlin, and Düsseldorf International Exhibition of Religious Art, and was donated to St Peter's Church, Ealing, by Prynne's widow after his death. A complete set of fourteen Stations of the Cross was later painted for the Rev. H. Eardley-Wilmot for St Mary's Church, Ilford, together with three altar panels for the church. The last altar panels painted by Prynne were for St Mary's Church, East Grinstead, representing Jesus' entombment, with adoring angels on each side. His picture, 'Lux Mundi,' was the motif of a large sculptured panel in the reredos above. In the same year that 'Christ Before Pilate' appeared, Prynne painted 'Rex Judaeorum', another religious painting, which was listed for sale in 1908 for £21 (over £1500 today).

Prynne's most ambitious scheme, and perhaps his masterpiece, was a mural painted on the walls of St. Peter's Church, Plymouth – a church designed by George Fellowes Prynne – in memory of their Father. Painted above the chancel arch, it depicted Christ triumphant, surrounded by hundreds of angels and saints. Such was the size of the painting, approximately 650 square feet, that it was executed in separate sections, pieced together. On the side walls immediately above the nave arcade were scenes from the life of St Peter, and other pictures adorn the walls of the church.

'The colouring of the mural was original and daring – Prynne used wax to dull surface of fresco without sacrificing depth of colour. The cerulean ground at the top of the composition, and the ringed gold of the halos, recalled the joyously ecstatic art of Fra Angelico, and formed a rich harmony with the multi-hued draperies, giving also the keynote to the layers of violet cloud that separated the rows of figures.' Tragically, the paintings were destroyed when the church was damaged during World War Two.

Another important collaboration between Prynne and George Fellowes Prynne was at St Peter's Church, Staines, where the artist provided vibrant and complex window designs of remarkable quality and beauty for his brother's new church. The windows, created from the 1890s onwards, are considered to constitute one of Prynne's finest legacies. In 1903, his design for the Staines Nativity Window was displayed at the Royal Academy 135th Exhibition.

Prynne often worked as an outside glass designer for various architects and designers. This included John J Jennings (as at St Peter's Church Staines), whose glassworks were on Clapham Road in South London, and Percy Bacon Brothers.

Other notable examples of collaboration between the Prynne brothers include altar panels at Holy Trinity, Roehampton, and St Mary, East Grinstead, and a reredos at St Mary the Virgin Church, Hayes.

In addition to the Royal Academy, Prynne exhibited pictures at Royal Society of British Artists, New Gallery, Grosvenor Gallery, and at important galleries in Liverpool, Glasgow, Birmingham and Brussels. He was elected as a member of the Royal Society of British Artists in October 1895.

== Final years and death ==
Representing the pinnacle of his painted devotional work, in 1918, the Anglican religious order the Cowley Fathers, approached Prynne to create a set of 14 painted Stations of the Cross for St John the Evangelist Church, Oxford. Prynne thought that the church "afforded a unique opportunity by reason of the splendid wall-space'' and regarded the commission as "a very great pleasure and high privilege," and over the next few years he and the Fathers wrangled over the details. The striking – although not unproblematic – set of images was finally installed in the church in 1921. The station depicting Christ's trial is based on Prynne's earlier picture, 'Christ Before Pilate', painted in 1898. The last four 'Stations' were the final paintings on which Prynne worked – the last painting he touched was the 'Entombment of Christ.'

On 29 January 1921, Prynne's eldest daughter, Beatrice, was married to Yule Crosby (1889–1977) at St Peter's Church, Ealing. Crosby was a South African mining engineer who met the Prynne family whilst he was working as a billeting officer in London during the First World War. The newly married couple emigrated to South Africa, and Edward never saw his daughter again, nor meet his grandchild (also called Beatrice), born the following year.

Just before his death, Prynne was included in an Illustrated Who's who of Notable Londoners – one of just 22 artists, including Edwin Lutyens and Philip de László. Other Londoners featured, included Winston Churchill and David Lloyd George.

Prynne died on 28 December 1921. He was buried in the churchyard of St Mary the Virgin Church, Hayes (where his brother, George Fellowes Prynne was also later buried). His obituary in The Builder magazine opined that:

"It is not too much to say that the death of Edward Arthur Fellowes Prynne on December 28 removes from the religious art world an artist of very exceptional ability, and one whose absolute sincerity and devotion to the highest ideals of his art are stamped upon every kind of work of a religious character that he undertook. [...] In his views on art generally he was very broad-minded, and always aimed at seeing the good points in a fellow-artist's work, if such there were, rather than offering severe criticism, and he always welcomed honest criticism of his own work. [...] In private life Mr. Prynne was a very attractive character, and had the power of making and retaining the friendship of others. He was intensely fond of music, and, aided by Mrs. Prynne, constantly entertained friends in a charmingly informal manner, and there are many who will look back with mingled feelings of pleasure and regret on the delightful musical evenings spent in that interesting and altogether fascinating studio."[8]

On 29 September 1922, Prynne's widow, Emma Prynne, presented her late husband's famous 1898 painting of 'Christ Before Pilate' to St Peter's Church, Ealing, in his memory. (In 1947, one of Prynne's daughters additionally donated a set of photographic reproductions of his Stations of the Cross for the Cowley Fathers – now lost).

In 1934, Beatrice, Yule and their three children visited Emma Fellowes Prynne, who still lived at number 1 Woodville Road in Ealing. Edward Arthur Fellowes Prynne's studio in the garden remained partly furnished as before his death 23 years before. Emma Fellowes Prynne's daughter Beatrice later emigrated from South Africa to New Zealand.

== Sale prices ==
In 1985 Prynne's 'Portrait of Mark Tucker' sold for £418 at auction. The same year 'a religious roundel' was sold for £4,000. In 1998, Prynne's painting, 'Enthroned', sold for $17,000.

== Galleries and public collections ==
- The Bishop's Palace, Exeter, holds a portrait of Frederick Temple (1821–1902), Bishop of Exeter (1869–1885), later Archbishop of Canterbury.
- Russell-Cotes Art Gallery & Museum holds two pictures by Edward Fellowes Prynne.

== Known church work ==
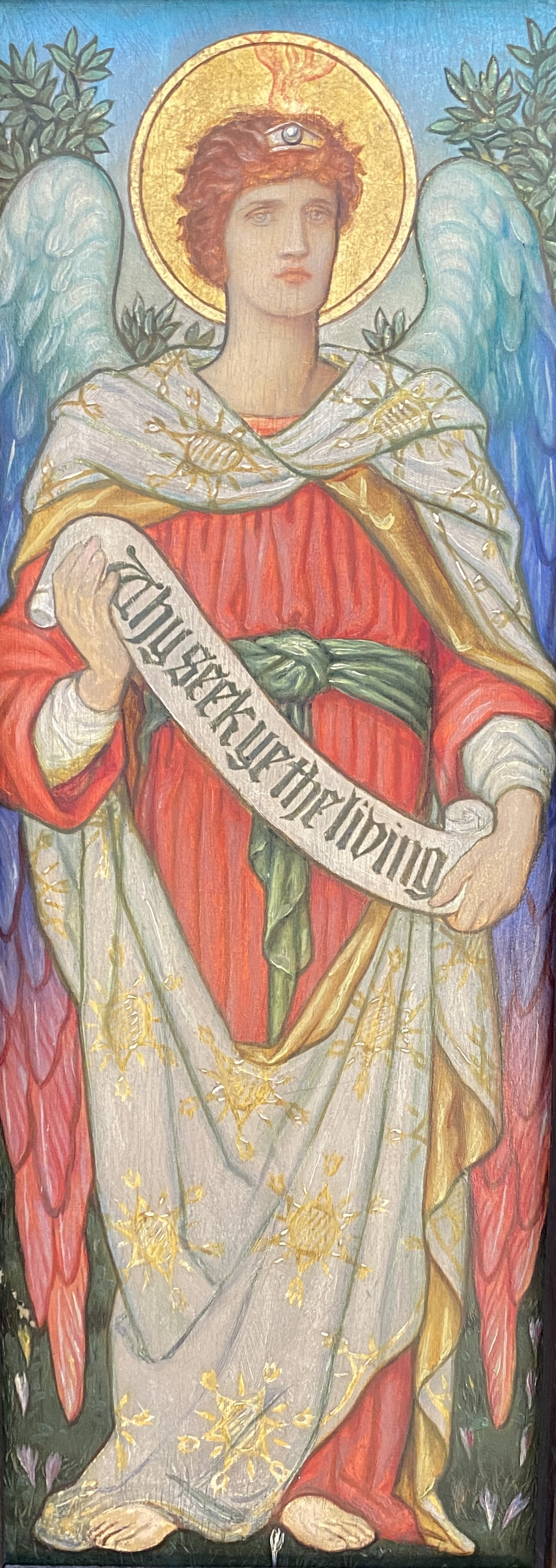
Edward Arthur Fellowes Prynne's painted angel alter panel at St Mary the Virgin Church, Ilford, Essex

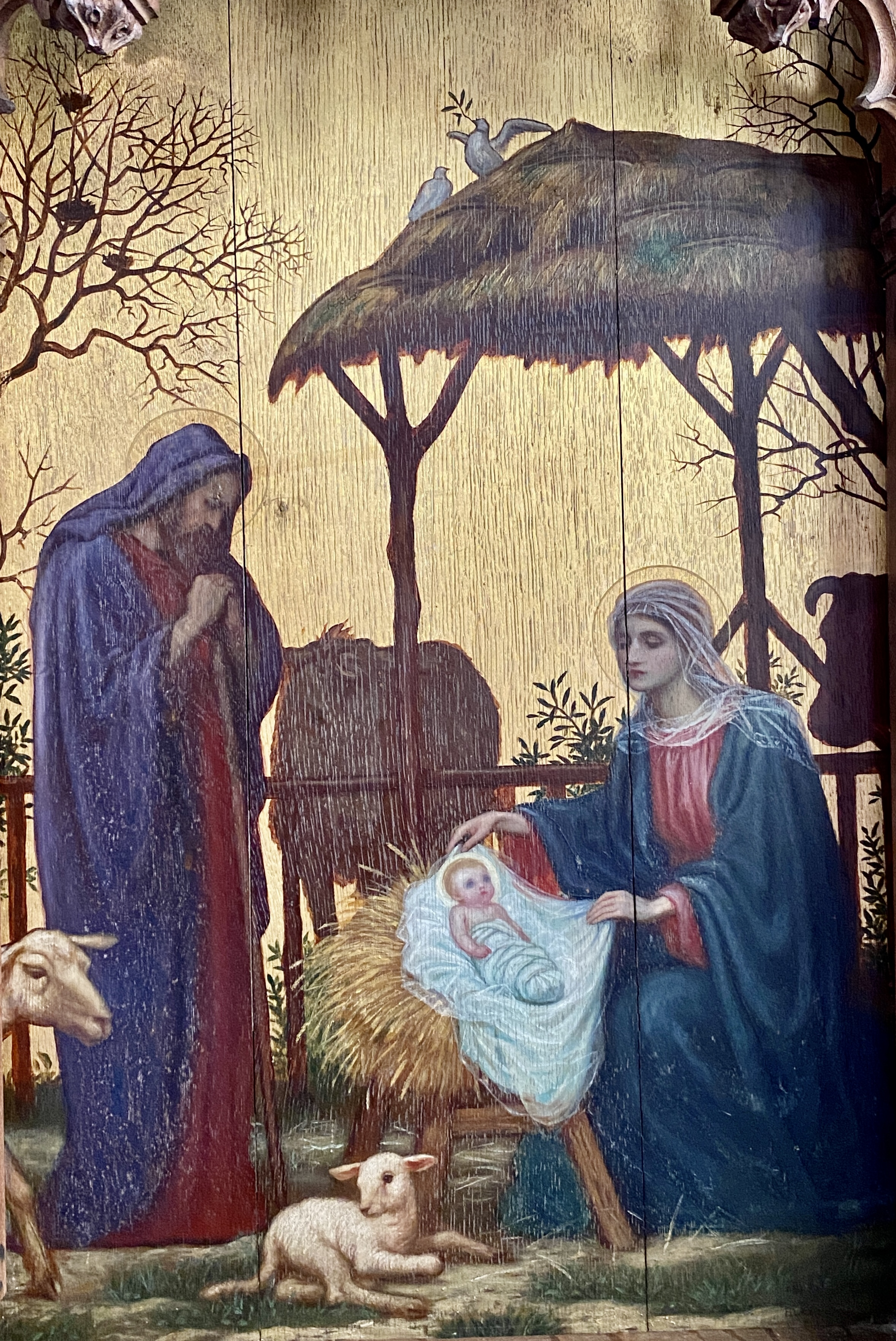
Edward Arthur Fellowes Prynne painted reredos panels at St Winifred's Church Manaton in Devon

- St Nicholas's Church Arundel (West Sussex). In 1895 Prynne also created a design for a wall painting depicting Christ in Glory, surrounded by apostles and saints, with adoring angels and symbols from the Revelations. This was never executed. St Nichola also has reredos panels attributed to Prynne; this is doubtful.
- Bradfield St George (Suffolk). East window designed in 1913 by Prynne working for John J Jennings.
- All Saints Church Bradford (Devon). 1905 altar panels by Prynne.
- St Stephen's Church, St Stephen-in-Brannel (Cornwall). Three 1893/4 Prynne high altar panels depicting Jesus Christ as The Lamb and two censing angels. Church restored by George Fellowes Prynne, and altar designed by him.
- St Peter's Church, Brighton. Three Prynne altar reredos panels depicting St Peter, St Andrew and the Risen Christ, painted in 1919.
- St Peter's Church, Ealing, London. Prynne's well-known painting depicting 'Christ Before Pilate' dated 1898 was donated to the church in by his widow in 1922.
- St Mary's, East Grinstead, West Sussex. Three altar panels by Prynne signed on the reverse with his name and monogram.
- Church of All Saints, Elland, Yorkshire. Prynne designed the stained glass for this Church built by brother.
- St Mark's Church, Hadlow Down, East Sussex. Prynne Painting of 'The Madonna of the Magnificat' completed Prynne in 1894 and exhibited at the Royal Academy,
- St Mary the Virgin Church, Hayes, Middlesex. Prynne reredos panels painted in 1911.
- St Mary the Virgin Church, Ilford, Essex. A complete set of fourteen Stations of the Cross was painted for the Vicar, the Rev. H. Eardley-Wilmot between 1916 and 1918. Prynne also painted three altar panels, depicting two angels and Jesus' resurrection in the centre installed in 1919
- All Hallows Church, Kea, Cornwall. Prynne altar panel paintings of angels, seraphim and the Lamb for a Church built by his brother in 1894–6.
- St Ladoca's Church, Ladock, Cornwall. Painted altar front by Prynne dated 1897.
- St Margaret's Church, Leytonstone. Prynne Stations of the Cross.
- St Barnabas Church, Linslade, Buckinghamshire. Painted altar front attributed to Prynne, probably dating from 1912.
- St Winifred's Church, Manaton, Devon. Church restored by George Fellowes Prynne between 1890 and 1892, with 23 painted reredos panels by Prynne in 1896.
- St John the Evangelist Church, Oxford. Set of 14 Stations of the Cross for the Cowley Fathers, dedicated in 1921.
- St Thomas a Becket's Church, Pagham, West Sussex. The church has three Prynne Windows dated 1911.
- St Mary the Virgin Church, Payhembury, Devon. 1897-8 restoration by George Fellowes Prynne, with Lady Chapel painted altar panels, now removed, by Edward Arthur Fellowes Prynne in 1899.
- St John's Church, Penzance, Cornwall. 1902 George Fellowes Prynne reredos with 11 1902 painted panels by Edward Arthur Fellowes Prynne.
- St Peter the Apostle, Plymouth. IN 1904, Prynne provided wall paintings above the chancel arch of the church in memory of his father Revd George Rundle Prynne, the late Vicar. These were destroyed when the church was damaged during the Second World War.
- St Mark's, Woodcote, Purley Surrey. Prynne created a Lady Chapel altar panel painting and painted canopy above (1910), in a church designed by his brother.
- Holy Trinity, Roehampton. opulent altar panels created by Prynne in 1898, predominantly gold and red, and depicting Seraphim and The Lamb. Prynne's designs were coloured under the supervision of Messrs Fouracres of Plymouth. The church is a neo-gothic building by George Fellowes Prynne.
- Holy Trinity Church, St Austell. Edward Arthur Fellowes Prynne frescos from 1891 on either side of, and above, the East window, representing the Nativity and the Lord's Supper. The roof decoration may also be designed by Prynne. The work as undertaken by Messrs. Fouracre and Watson, of Stonehouse, Plymouth. George Fellowes Prynne undertook a significant amount restoration at the church between 1896 and 1924.
- St Peter's Church, Staines, Berkshire. Ten windows designed by Fellowes Prynne between 1901 and his death for a Church designed by his brother. The windows were created by various craftspeople, and the last one wasn't made and installed until 1932, 11 years after Fellowes Prynne's death.
- St Augustine's Church, Stepney. Prynne's painting 'The Desire of all Nations' was purchased by the Rev. Harry Wilson for St. Augustine's Church, Stepney, together with a set of Prynne's Stations of the Cross'. The church is now deconsecrated. The location of The Desire of All Nations is now unknown.

=== Other religious and allegorical work ===
- Painting of St Barnabas. Purchased in 1889 as a dedication picture for the new St Barnabas Hospital in Saltash, Devon.
- 'Rex Judaeourum' (1898). The painted was listed for sale in 1908: 'Frynne, E. A. Fellowes (1893). "Rex Judroorum," 44 x 5?,^ (Wood). £21'.
- Twixt Memory & Hope' (c. 1896). The painting depicts "a venerable pilgrim, painfully making his way through the thorns and briars of life, helped forward by a winged figure of Hope, whilst Memory lightly holds him by his girdle."
- 'Cophetua's Queen,' Eurydice,'
- 'Orpheus and Eurydice,'
- 'Pan and Syrinx'
- ' Silent Voices of the Studio.'
- 'Enthroned' (1889).

== Portraits ==
- Portrait of John F. Winnicott, from the collection of The Box (Plymouth City Council).
- Portrait of James Atlay, Bishop of Hereford (1882). The picture was presented by the Diocese of Hereford on the completion of his 25-year episcopate, and was later in the possession of Mrs. Atlay.
- Portrait of Frederick Temple, Bishop of Exeter, later Archbishop of Canterbury (1886).
- Portrait of the Duke of Edinburgh, Alfred, Duke of Saxe-Coburg and Gotha, second son of Queen Victoria. Mezzotint prints of the painting are held by the British Museum and the Royal Museums Greenwich (1892).
- Portrait of The Reverend Henry William Hill (1892). In the collection of Chastleton House, National Trust, in Oxfordshire
- Portrait of Mark Tucker. The painting was sold in 1985 for £418.
