= St John's Church, Penzance =

St John the Baptist Church, Penzance
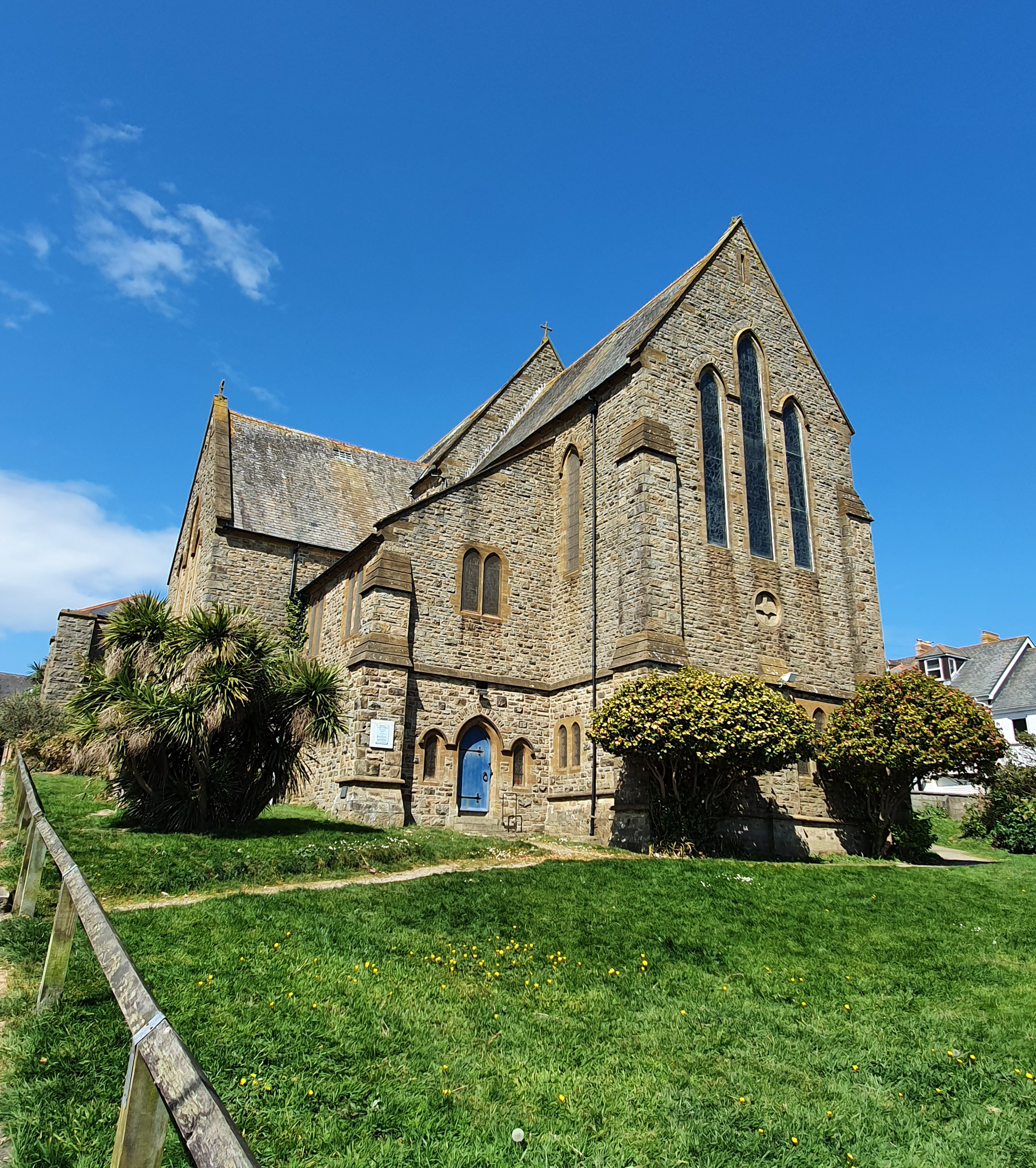
- St John the Baptist Church, Penzance

- Location within Cornwall
- 50°07′24.46″N 05°32′6.98″W
- OS grid reference: SW 47404 30807
- Location: Penzance
- Country: England
- Denomination: Church of England
- Website: penleecluster.org.uk

History
- Dedication: John the Baptist
- Consecrated: 4 October 1881

Architecture
- Heritage designation: Grade II listed
- Architect: James Piers St Aubyn
- Style: Early English Gothic
- Groundbreaking: 23 June 1880
- Construction cost: £6,146 equivalent to £646,100 in 2025)

Specifications
- Capacity: 600 persons
- Length: 95 feet (29 m)
- Height: 50 feet (15 m)

Administration
- Diocese: Truro
- Archdeaconry: Cornwall
- Deanery: Penwith
- Parish: St Mary w St Paul and St John the Baptist

St John the Baptist’s Church, Penzance is a parish church in the Church of England Diocese of Truro in Penzance, Cornwall.

== History ==
The need for a new church for Penzance was first raised by the vicar of Penzance, Revd. Prebendary Hedgeland on 22 December 1878. At that time Penzance had a population of 10,414 but only two churches, whereas Truro had a population of 11,040 with four churches.

The site on which the church was built was given by John Jope Rogers, measuring 324 ft by 257 ft with space for later construction of a vicarage and schools. The architect was James Piers St Aubyn and the contractors appointed were Messrs Carah and Edwards, Crowan.

The foundation stone for the new church was laid on 23 June 1880 The building was constructed with stone from Castle an Dinas, St Columb Major. The external dressed stonework was done in Ham Hill stone from the quarries of Charles Trask in Somerset and the internal dressed stonework was in Doulting stone from the same quarries. The nave and aisle floors were to be laid with thin paving-tiles of three colours from the Architectural Pottery Company, Poole in Dorset, with encaustic tiles for other floor areas from Messrs Godwin of Hereford. The vestries were heated with Welsh fire lamps, and the church by Rimington’s apparatus. The font was an old one with a date of 1668 which was donated by St Mary's Church, Penzance. The church was lit by 12 gas coronas suspended from the arches of the arcades.

The church was consecrated on 4 October 1881 by the bishop of Truro, Rt. Revd. Edward White Benson.

The porch was added around 1890. A statue of St John the Baptist was added in 1891.

The choir stalls of west country oak with accommodation for 16 men and 19 boys and a pulpit were installed in 1900. The reredos of 1902 and the altar of 1908 were designed by George Fellowes Prynne and constructed by H.H. Martyn of Cheltenham. The wrought-iron chancel screen and gates were added in 1905.

== Stained glass ==
- East window 1901 by Clayton and Bell. Subject: the ascension. A memorial to Queen Victoria and the soldiers of the Second Boer War.
- North aisle 1901 by Charles Eamer Kempe. The Poole Memorial Window. Subjects: St Michael the Archangel and St George.
- North aisle 1970 by G. Maile
- South transept 1955 by William Morris and Co in memory of Ellen Carhart Lane, Mayoress of Penzance.

== Incumbents ==
- A.L. Palmes 1882-1883 (afterwards vicar of Bodmin)
- Edward Townend 1883-1896
- T.F. Maddrell 1896-1911
- H.R. Jennings 1911-1922
- E. Vernon Shaw 1922-1939 (Formerly Rector of St Mewan Church)
- A.G. Coombs 1939-1950 (formerly vicar of St Augustine’s Church, Thorpe Bay, Essex)
- Dennis Warden Halt from 1950 (formerly vicar of Mevagissey)

== Organ ==
A single manual and pedal organ by J.W. Walker was installed in 1883 at a cost of £220 equivalent to £23,128 in 2025). A second manual was provided for but not equipped with stops.

It was enlarged and improved over the years. It was rebuilt by Heard and Sons in 1902 then later in 1931 by Hele and J.W. Walker in 1966 and Lance Foy in 1990 to form a 3 manual and pedal instrument.

The specification can be found on the National Pipe Organ Register.

=== Organists ===
- Martin Bodinner 1883 - 1884 (afterwards organist of St Petroc's Church, Bodmin)
- Robert S. Airey 1884 - 1887 (afterwards organist at Romsey Abbey)
- George Sellers 1887 - 1955
- John (Jack) Retallack
