= St Mary the Virgin Church, Hayes, Hillingdon =

Coordinates: 51°31′05″N 0°25′13″W

St Mary the Virgin Church, Hayes
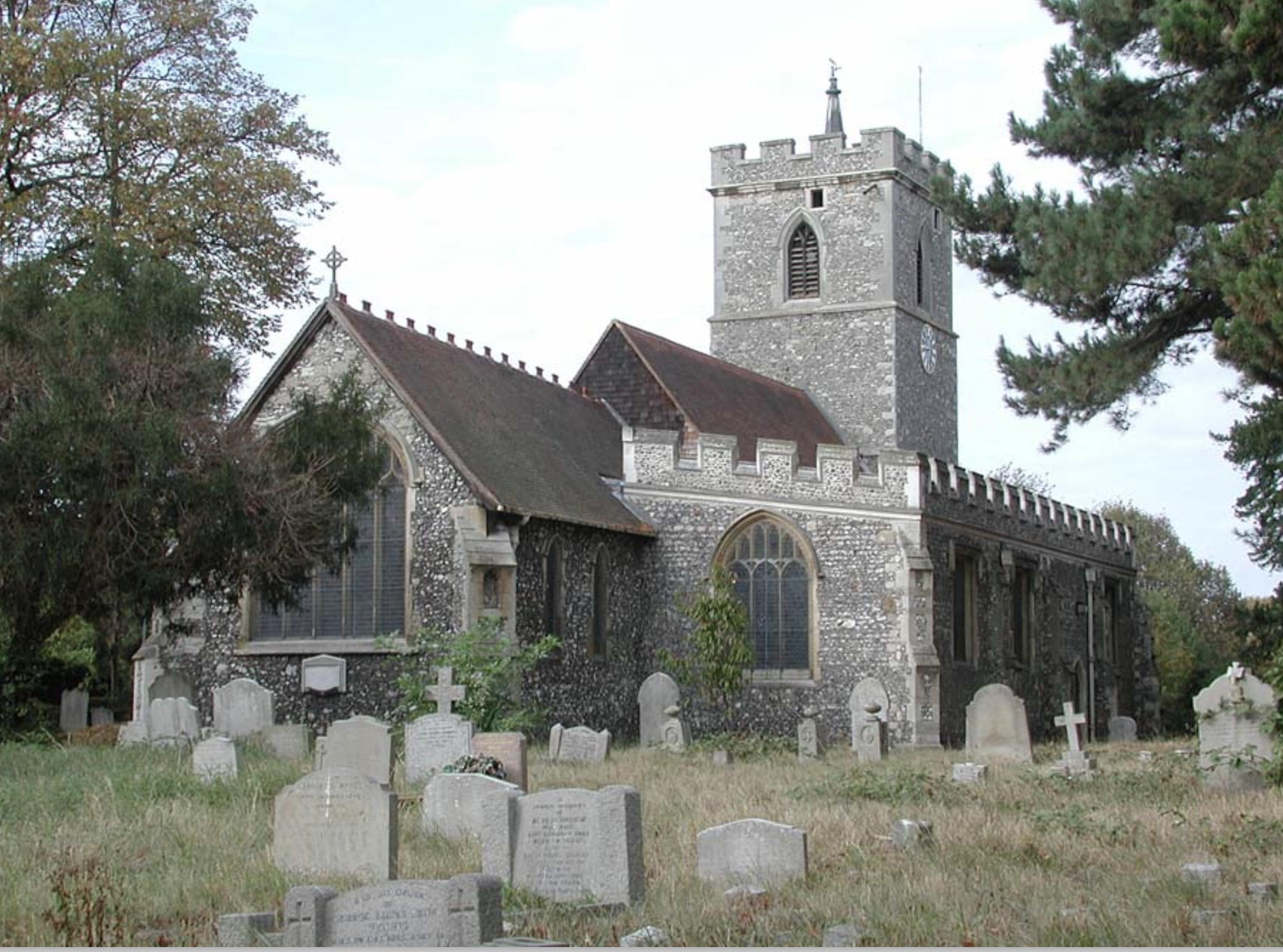
- St Mary's Church Hayes
- St Mary the Virgin Church, Hayes
- Location: Hayes
- Country: England
- Denomination: Church of England

History
- Dedication: Virgin Mary

Administration
- Diocese: London

St Mary the Virgin Church is a partly medieval Grade II* listed flint church on Church Road in Hayes, Hillingdon. The central portion of the church, the chancel and the nave, was built in the 13th century, the north aisle in the 15th century (as was the tower), and the south aisle in the 16th century, along with the lychgate and the south porch.

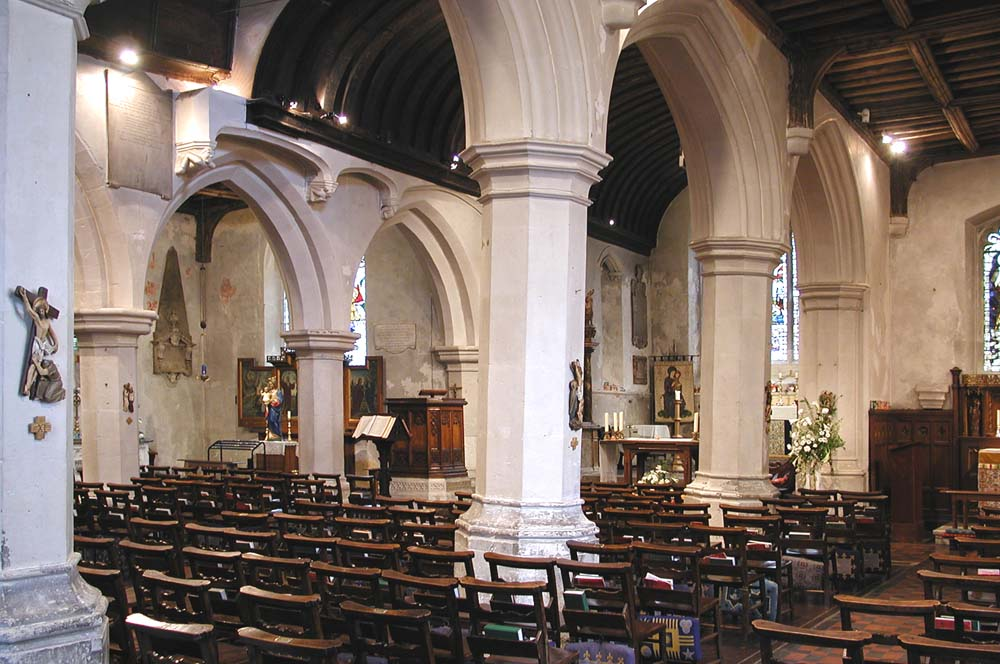
Diagonal view of the east end of this stepped hall church with timber ceilings

The lychgate and wall to the south are Hayes's entry in the Domesday Book (1086) makes no mention of a church or chapel, and the name of St Mary suggests a 12th-century dedication as it was at this time that church dedications in this name first appeared in England. Besides the church, the other main building in medieval villages was the manor house. The manor house formerly associated with the church was assigned to Canterbury Cathedral by Christian priest Warherdus as far back as 830 AD.

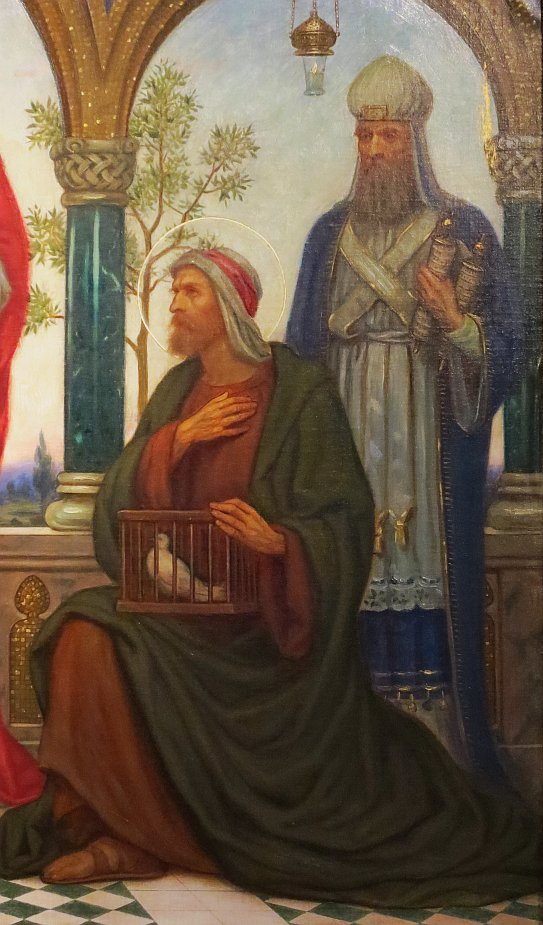
Reredos at St Mary the Virgin, Hayes, painted by Edward Fellowes Prynne and designed by his brother George Fellowes Prynne

The embossed roof of the nave reflects the Tudor period with emblems of the crucifixion and the arms of Henry and Aragon (the lands passed to Henry VIII as a consequence of the English Reformation). Victorian restorers donated a number of windows, and more recent additions include windows to Saints Anselm and Nicholas. The Coronation window is in the north aisle above the Triptych painted by the pre-Raphaelite Edward Arthur Fellowes Prynne. His brother George Fellowes Prynne carved the Reredos with St Anselm and St George in the niches. Edward and George Prynne are both buried in the churchyard.

There is an ornate altar tomb of Sir Edward Fenner, a judge, and a monumental brass to Robert Lellee, who was rector in 1370, surrounded by some medieval floor tiles.

Cherry Lane Cemetery on Shepiston Lane was founded in the mid-1930s to provide a new burial ground when the churchyard at St Mary's Church had run out of space.

As a young boy Steve Priest, member of the rock band Sweet, sang in the choir of the church.
