= Holy Trinity, Roehampton =

Church in Roehampton, London, England

Coordinates: 51.449204°N 0.237166°W

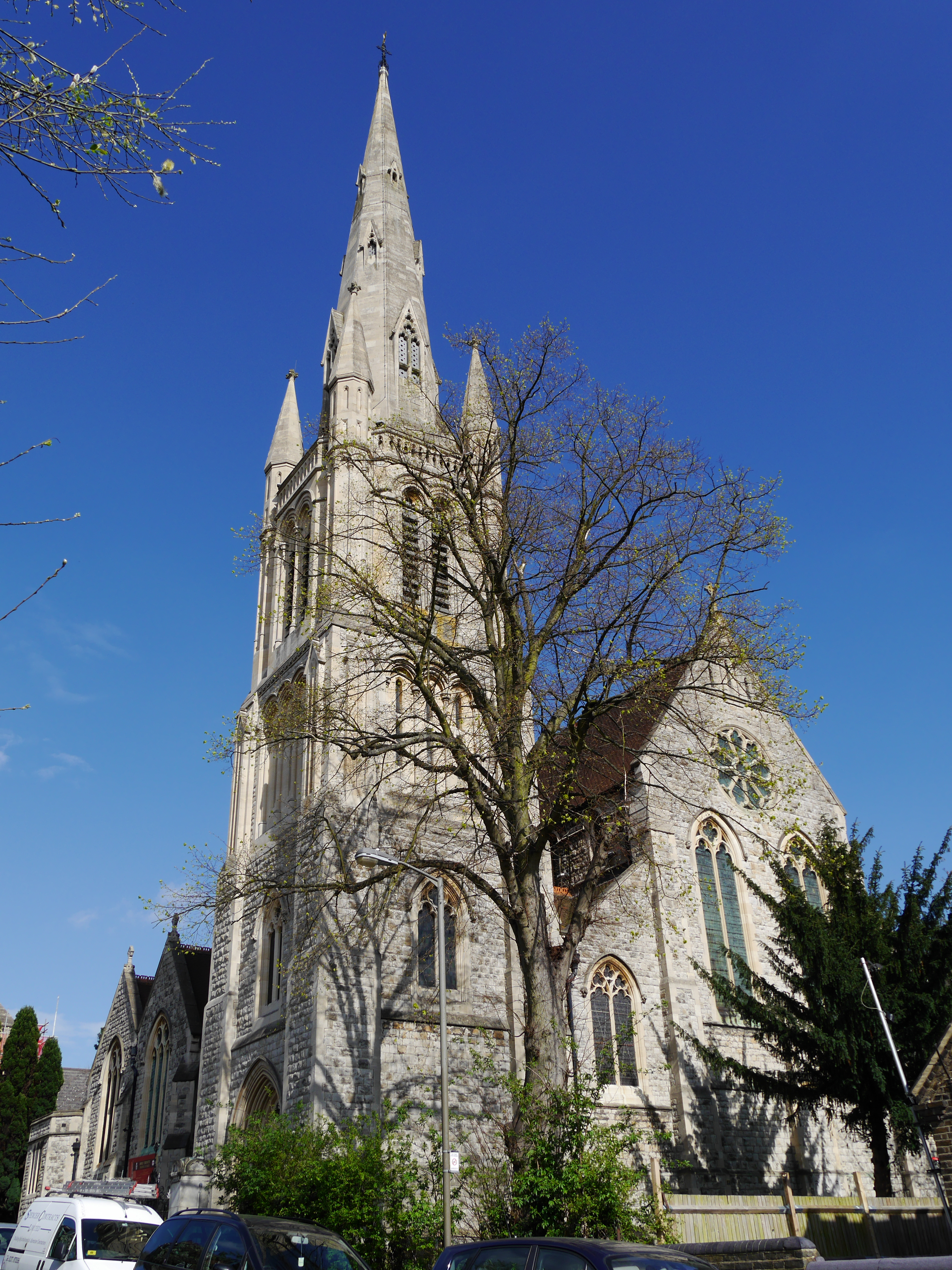
Holy Trinity, Roehampton

Holy Trinity is the Church of England parish church for Roehampton, located in Ponsonby Road, SW15 4LA.

Morning and Evening Prayer are said and sung daily in the church except Saturdays, 8.30 and 5.30.

The main weekly service is 10am on Sunday. All are welcome.

The building is Grade II* listed. Its spire, which rises 230 feet, is of Corsham stone, a fine grained Bath Stone and is regarded as a landmark for the area.

The church, which is within the diocese of Southwark, was built in 1896–98, and the architect was George Fellowes Prynne.
