= St Stephen's Church, Ealing =

Christian congregation and community centre

St Stephen's
- The current church (left), community centre (middle) and stone former church (right)

- Location within Greater London
- 51.5197°N 0.3193°W
- Location: West Ealing
- Country: England
- Denomination: Church of England
- Website: www.ststephens-ealing.org

History
- Founded: 1867
- Founder: Stephen Hilliard
- Dedication: St Stephen
- Dedicated: 1867, 1876, 1986

Architecture
- Architect(s): J. Ashdown; A. Rovedino; Sir Arthur Blomfield; Ian Goldsmid
- Style: Victorian Gothic

Administration
- Diocese: London
- Parish: St Stephen, Ealing

Clergy
- Bishop: Bishop Lusa Nsenga-Ngoy
- Vicar(s): Reverend David Baylor, Curate: Reverend Alison Ingram, Associate Minister: Reverend Hannah Baylor

St Stephen's Church is a Church of England church on Castlebar Hill in Ealing. It was founded in 1867 as a mission and is now established as a separate parish. The first church building was a temporary iron church which was then replaced in 1876 by a substantial Victorian Gothic stone building which is now Grade II listed. Subsidence made that unsafe and it was deconsecrated in 1979. It has been converted to flats but still forms the landmark centrepiece of the St Stephen's Conservation Area. The congregation now holds services on the site of the church hall which has been redeveloped as the third church building and community centre.

== History ==
The parish of Christ Church was created in Ealing in 1853 for the increased population in the area, following the opening of a railway station in 1838. The population continued to grow and the vicar, Stephen Hilliard, decided to establish a mission on Castlebar Hill, to the northwest, where Henry de Bruno Austin was developing the area with large houses. The first church building was prefabricated from corrugated iron for rapid construction – an iron church. This opened as St Stephen's on Wednesday, 12 June 1867 with a sermon preached by the Bishop of Ripon, Robert Bickersteth.

The second permanent church building was a substantial stone church, built of ragstone with ashlar dressings and a slate roof. It cost £6,000 and was consecrated on 3 June 1876 by the Bishop of London. A tall steeple was added in 1891, designed by Sir Arthur Blomfield. The attendance by the end of the century was substantial — 570 worshippers being recorded for morning services in 1903 plus another 300 in the evening. In 1907, the vicar, Dr. Tupholme, founded a new mission church at the foot of the hill in Pitshanger. This was St Barnabas' Church, which was initially another iron church seating just 250 worshippers, and so a more substantial brick church was built nearby, seating a thousand. Plans for this were discussed in 1911 at a meeting chaired by Henry Vivian of the Brentham Garden Suburb and it was agreed that there would be restrictions on bell-ringing. After its large church building was completed in 1916, St Barnabas became a separate parish.

The stone church built for St Stephen's still stands and is listed for preservation as Grade II. It was deconsecrated in 1979 after subsidence caused it to become unsafe and it was then converted into flats as St Stephen's Court. The St Stephen's congregation continued to meet in the church hall to the south east and that site was then redeveloped into the current church building, which was dedicated in 1987. This is a lower complex in modern red brick with slate roofs and is called St Stephen's Church Centre.

=== Bells ===
A set of eight bells were cast for the steeple by Mears & Stainbank at the Whitechapel Bell Foundry. These were completed in 1911 and blessed for use in 1912. A team of bell ringers was soon established and their regular Sunday peal lasted 40 minutes. Visiting teams of bell ringers were also invited and, in 1921, the Ancient Society of College Youths rang a peal of 2 hours on a Saturday. This caused complaints – "Why do they have this tremendous bell ringing? ... what might almost be termed cruelty" – and the Reverend Maynard called a meeting which agreed that the bells should only be rung on alternate Sundays. Later, in 1979, when the building was declared unsafe, the bells were removed and stored in a Docklands warehouse as possible replacements for the swaying bells of St Mary's Church, Rotherhithe. But instead, in 1987, the bells were restored by Eayre & Smith and then installed in St Machar's Cathedral in Aberdeen which is now one of the few churches in Scotland to have a set of bells designed for change ringing.

=== Conservation area ===
The stone church building is on an island site at the head of The Avenue – a broad, straight road, lined with mature plane trees, which leads up the hill to the church in a grand, processional style. This avenue and its continuation of North Avenue form the spine of the St Stephen's Conservation Area. The housing of this area is subject to planning controls to preserve its Edwardian appearance and character. The assessment commissioned by the borough council explains the importance of the church for this scene:

The listed former Church of St Stephen is the landmark dominating the skyline and streetscape, the focal point along all the roads in and around the CA, and visible from outside the CA. The former church not only gives its name to the CA, but also is the key point around which the area has developed and streets have been oriented. The importance of the building in the landscape was even more apparent one hundred years ago when the trees were saplings and the views down the roads were less inhibited.

=== School ===
1881 plans for the parochial school

A parochial school was opened by the church in 1867. This used a stable in Castlebar Mews off Pitshanger Lane. This was crowded and so a purpose-built schoolroom and house were built nearby on Albert Road and they opened in 1882. They too became crowded and, by 1910, the attendance was 209 pupils. In 1911, the girls and infants were transferred to North Ealing School, which was run by the council. The boys were transferred too in 1921 and the school buildings were leased to the council. They closed as a school in 1934 and were then sold privately in 1937.

== Services ==
An informal Sunday service in the new church building

The church now holds daily services each weekday morning. On Sundays, there is a traditional Anglican service which follows the Common Worship liturgy and uses the New International Version of the Bible. After a refreshment break, this is followed by a more informal service in which the music is performed in a contemporary style. There are also special services for occasions in the church calendar including Advent, Easter and Christmas.

Other programmes include the Alpha course, a summer fête, afternoon tea and a Shining Stars group for young children and their parents.

== Gallery ==
Reverend Benjamin Seymour Tupholme was the vicar from 1871 to 1912.

Poster announcing the consecration of the permanent church on 3 June 1876

The stone church in the 1880s after the vicarage was built but before the steeple was added

Construction of the steeple around 1890

Sir Arthur Blomfield's steeple in 2017

Rev. Steve Newbold celebrating communion

The stone church building from the south-west

The stone church exposed after Storm Eunice blew down a tree
