= George Fellowes Prynne =

English architect (1853–1927)

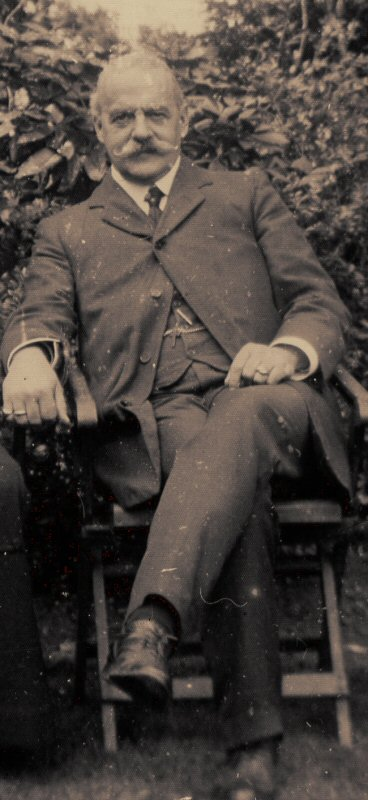
- Born: 2 April 1853; Plymouth, England
- Died: 7 May 1927 (aged 74); Ealing (London), England
- Resting place: St Mary the Virgin Church, Hayes, Hillingdon
- Citizenship: British
- Education: Royal Academy of Arts
- Occupation: Architect
- Years active: 1878-1927
- Spouse: Bertha Geraldine Bradbury
- Children: 7, including Harold Fellowes Prynne
- Parent(s): George Rundle Prynne, Emily Fellowes
- Relatives: Edward Arthur Fellowes Prynne (brother)

George Fellowes Prynne FRIBA (2 April 1853 – 7 May 1927) was an English ecclesiastic architect and part of the High Church school of Gothic Revival Architecture. Over the course of a 50-year career, he built, decorated, restored and/or reconstructed dozens of English churches, most of which are now Listed buildings. He was also well known for designing superb decorative elements, particularly windows and screens.

== Early life and education ==
George Halford Fellowes Prynne was born on 2 April 1853 at Wyndham Square, Plymouth, Devon. He was the second son of the Rev. George Rundle Prynne and Emily Fellowes, daughter of Rear Admiral Sir Thomas Fellowes. He was raised High Anglican; his father was the perpetual curate of St. Peter and The Holy Apostles church in Plymouth. His elder brother was the painter Edward Arthur Fellowes Prynne. George studied at St Mary's College, Harlow and St Andrew's Academy in Chardstock then, after briefly studying to enter the Church, went instead to Eastman’s Royal Naval Academy at Southsea.

== Career ==
Prynne's family was not wealthy and found his education to be expensive. In 1871, aged 18, Prynne sailed America to work with a cousin who had taken land, and spent two years farming in the western states of America. Here, he learned about building log houses, barns and a brick and wooden house. But finding the work "trying and severe", he travelled to Toronto and was appointed to the role of Junior Assistant in the office of architect Richard Cunningham Windeyer. Windeyer helped Prynne further his studies and, by 1875, he had gained a senior position.

Also in 1875, Prynne received an offer of employment from the architect George Edmund Street, an English ecclesiastical architect who had begun his career thanks to Prynne's father. Prynne returned to England and, after a year at Street's firm, went back to school, studying at the Royal Academy of Arts for two years. After graduating in 1878, he went to work for Edward Swinfen Harris, Robert Jewell Withers, Alfred Waterhouse, and at the London School Board offices. He commenced independent practice in 1879. Prynne became Architect to the Diocese of Oxford from 1913.

Prynne collaborated extensively with his brother Edward Arthur Fellowes Prynne who provided artwork for a number of the architect's churches. This includes St Peter’s Church Staines, which possesses Edward Arthur Fellowes Prynne windows of remarkable quality and beauty. Other examples include altar panels at Holy Trinity, Roehampton, and St Mary, East Grinstead, and a reredos at St Mary the Virgin Church, Hayes, where both brothers Prynne are now buried.

== Personal life and death ==
Prynne married Bertha Geraldine Bradbury in June 1882 in Wandsworth, London. They lived at Bloomsbury, then Kensington and, finally, Ealing. They had two daughters and five sons, two of whom were officers killed in action in World War I.

Their son Harold Fellowes Prynne, ARIBA, (1892–1984) spent several years working as a commercial illustrator in Madras before becoming an architect. He worked as the architect for the Church of Ireland diocese of Tuam from 1942 to c 1963.

After moving to Ealing, Prynne was very involved in the life of its parish. He designed St Saviour's Church, new buildings for St Saviour's Infant School (1927), and the Clergy House. St Saviour's Church was demolished in 1940 following bomb damage; the Clergy House survives.

Prynne's last project was an extension to Ealing Town Hall, including a new octagonal towered entrance. He had completed the design when, in 1927, he died suddenly; the work was completed by his assistant in 1931.

== Works ==
- St John's Church, Penzance, Cornwall, 1881. Reredos, rood screen and altar. Listed Grade II
- Church of All Saints, Budleigh Salterton, Devon, 1888. Pulpit.
- Church of St Matthias, Plymouth, Devon, 1891. Reredos. Listed Grade II
- The Grange, Private Residence, Hadlow Down, East Sussex, 1893
- Church of St Peter, Budleigh Salterton, Devon, 1893. Listed Grade II
- Church of St Peter, Draycott, Rodney Stoke, 1894. Rood Screen (attrib.)
- St James the Great, Antony, Cornwall, 1895. Window
- St Winwaloe's Church, Poundstock, Cornwall, 1896. Restoration, expansion, reredos. Listed Grade I
- Holy Cross Church, Newton Ferrers, Devon, 1886. Reconstruction. Listed Grade I
- St Peter's Church, Streatham, London, 1888. Expansion. Listed Grade II*
- Church of St Mary, Payhembury, Devon, 1889. Listed Grade I
- All Saints Church, West Dulwich, London, 1891. Listed Grade I
- Church of St Peter, Spelthorne, Surrey, 1893. Listed Grade II
- Priory of St Nicholas, Arundel, West Sussex, 1893. Nave roof.
- All Hallows Church of Saint Kea, Kea, Cornwall, 1894. Listed Grade II*
- St Stephen-in-Brannel, St Austell, Cornwall, 1894
- St Peter's Church, Staines-upon-Thames, Surrey, 1894
- Bar Lodge, Private Residence, Porthleven, Cornwall, 1895. Listed Grade II
- Church of All Saints, Elland, West Yorkshire, 1896. Listed Grade II*
- Holy Trinity, Roehampton, London, 1898. Listed Grade II*
- Holy Trinity Church, Ilfracombe, Devon, 1899. Chancel Roof. Listed Grade I
- Church of St Andrew, Sampford Courtenay, Devon, 1899. Restoration. Listed Grade I
- St John's Cathedral, Mthatha, Eastern Cape, South Africa, 1901
- Parish Church of St John the Evangelist, Bexley, London, 1901. Listed Grade II
- Church of All Saints, Winkleigh, Devon, 1902. Chancel Restoration. Listed Grade I
- Church of St Peter, Ilfracombe, Devon, 1902. Listed Grade II
- Church of St Peter, Chepping Wycombe, Buckinghamshire, 1903. Expansion. Listed Grade II
- Exeter Cathedral, Exeter, Devon, 1903, Cross
- Church of All Saints, Lewisham, London, 1903. Listed Grade II
- St Paul's Church, Weymouth, Dorset, 1894 and 1903. Listed Grade II
- Church of All Saints, Thurlestone, Devon, 1904. Restoration. Listed Grade II
- St Mary's Church & Hall, Johannesburg, South Africa, 1905
- New Church, Belvedere, London, 1905
- Church of St Martin of Tours, Ashurst, Kent, 1905. Refurbished. Listed Grade I
- St Columba's Church, St Columb Major, Cornwall, 1906. East windows and vestry screen.
- Church of St Peter, Plymouth, 1882 and 1906. Reconstruction. Listed Grade II
- Holy Trinity Church, Exmouth, Devon, 1907. Restoration. Listed Grade II*
- Clergy House, St Saviour's Church, Ealing, London, 1909. Listed Grade II
- St Alban's Church, Bournemouth, Dorset, 1909. Listed Grade II*
- St Mary the Virgin Church, Hayes, Hillingdon, London, 1909. Reredos. (Triptych by Charles Fenner Prynne).
- Church of St Mark, Croydon, London, 1910. Listed Grade II
- St Margaret and St Andrew's Church, Littleham, Exmouth, Devon, 1911. Windows. Listed Grade II*
- Church of St Nicholas, Taplow, Buckinghamshire, 1911. Listed Grade II
- St Stephen's, Twickenham, Richmond, London, 1911. Chancel screen (removed 1990s).
- St Andrew's Church, Ashburton, Devon, 1911. Organ case.
- The Church of St Martin, Worcester, Worcestershire, 1911. Listed Grade II
- St. Peter's Church, Harrow, London, 1912. Listed Grade II
- Old Parish Church of St Nicholas, Taplow, Buckinghamshire, 1912. Walls. Listed Grade II
- Church of St John the Baptist, Horrabridge, Devon, 1913. Porch. Listed Grade II*
- St Patrick's Cathedral Armagh, Northern Ireland, 1913. High altar and screen.
- St Mark's Church, Hadlow Down, East Sussex, 1913. Reconstruction. Listed Grade II
- Church of St Barnabas, Leighton–Linslade, Bedfordshire, 1914. Extension and lecturn. Listed Grade II
- Church of St Catherine of Alexandria, Whitestone, Devon, 1914. Restoration. Listed Grade I
- St Michael and All Angels Church, Hughenden, Buckinghamshire, 1916. Listed Grade II
- Church of St Mary, Wargrave, Berkshire, 1916. Reconstruction. Listed Grade II*
- Church of St Thomas-a-Becket, Kingsbridge, Devon, 1919. War Memorial
- Church of St Mary, Elland, West Yorkshire, 1920. Screens. Listed Grade I
- Parish Church of St Mary the Virgin, Henley-on-Thames, Berkshire, 1920. Rood Screen. Listed Grade II*
- Church of St Paul, Fareham, Hampshire, 1880 and 1922. Expansion. Listed Grade II
- Church of St James the Great, Hanslope, Buckinghamshire, 1924. Restoration. Listed Grade I
- Church of St Martin, Worcester, Worcestershire, 1920. World War I Memorial. Listed Grade II
- Church of the Holy Cross, Crediton, Devon, 1924. Reredos.
- Parish Church of St Barnabas, Royal Tunbridge Wells, Kent, c 1925. World War I Memorial Chapel (redone 1945).
- Church of the Holy Trinity, Folkestone, Kent, 1913 and 1928. Extensions. Listed Grade II*
- Ealing Town Hall, Ealing, London, 1931. Expansion
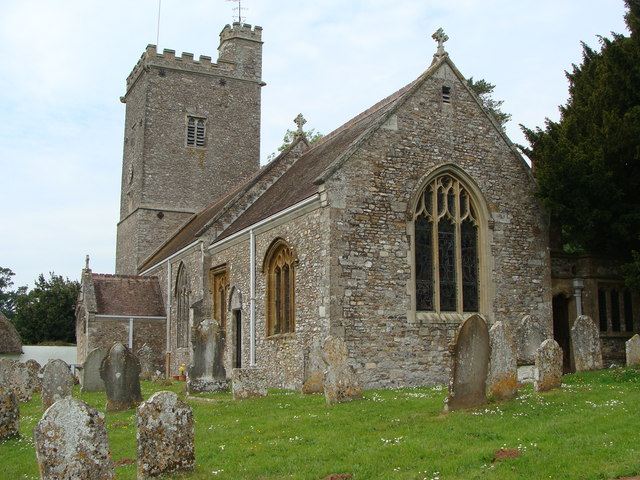
Church of St Mary's, Payhembury

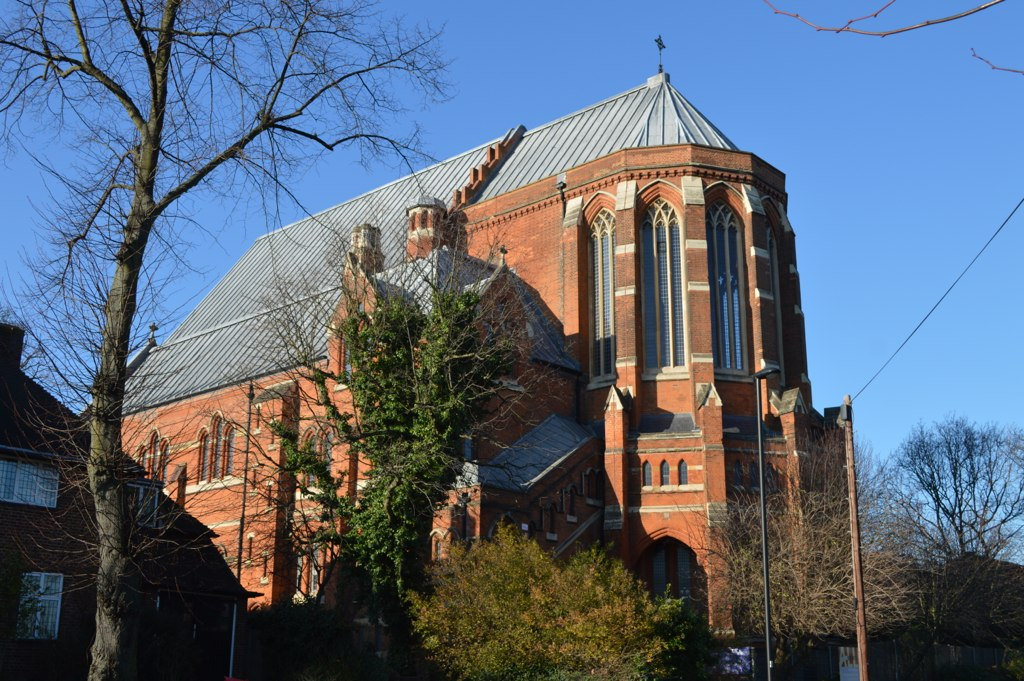
All Saints Church, West Dulwich

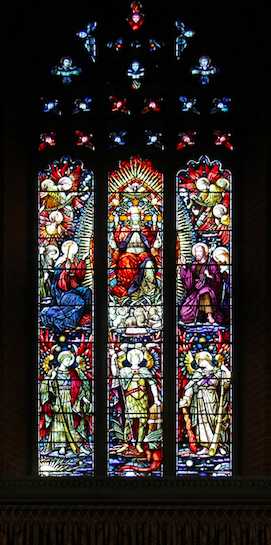
Window and glass at St Peter's Church Staines by George and Edward Fellowes Prynne

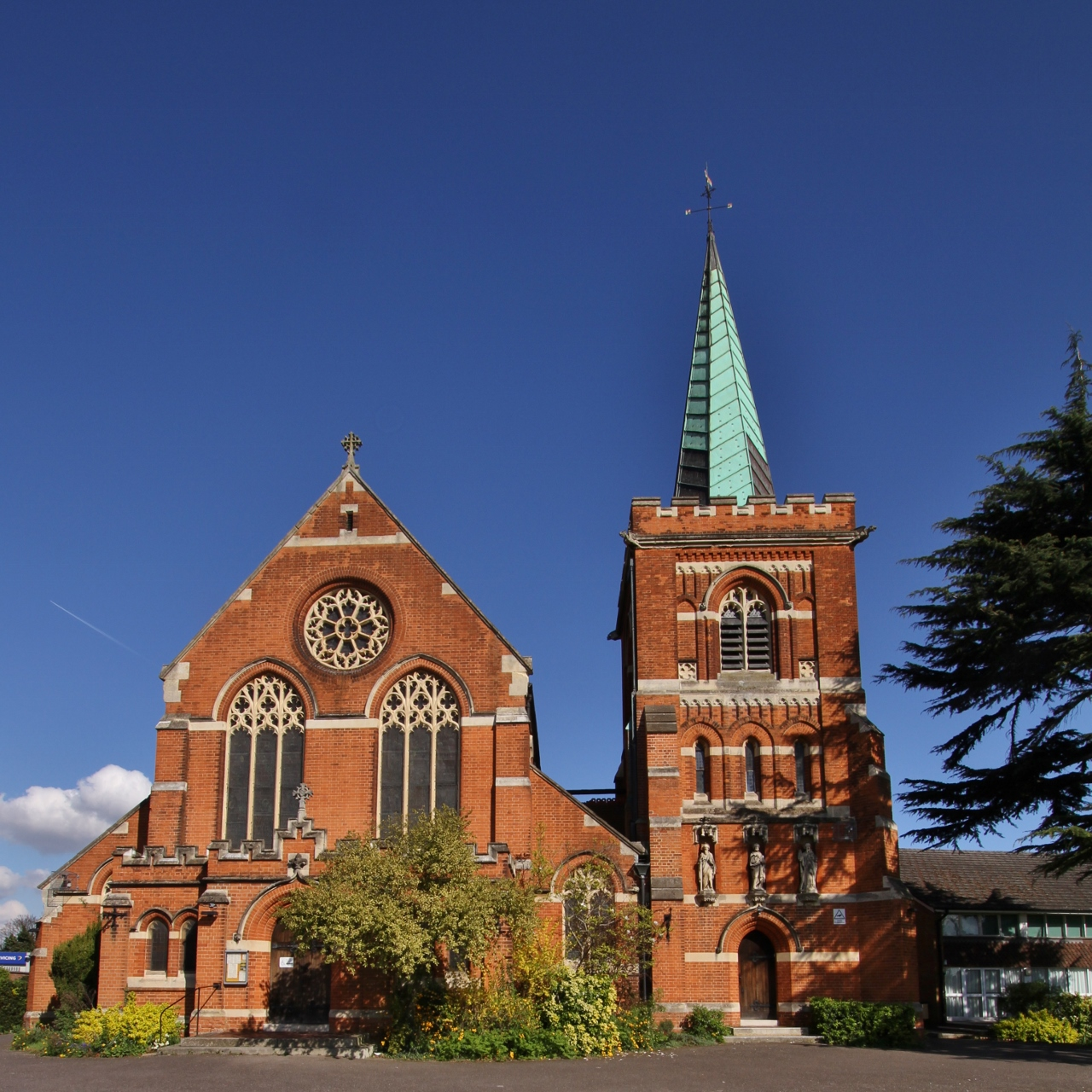
St Peter's parish church, Staines, Middlesex

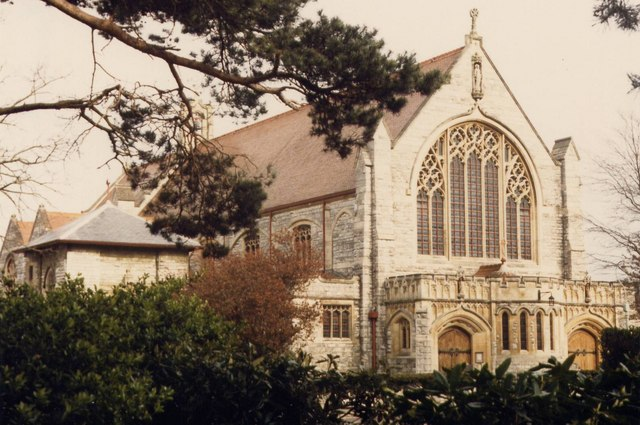
St Alban's Church, Bournemouth

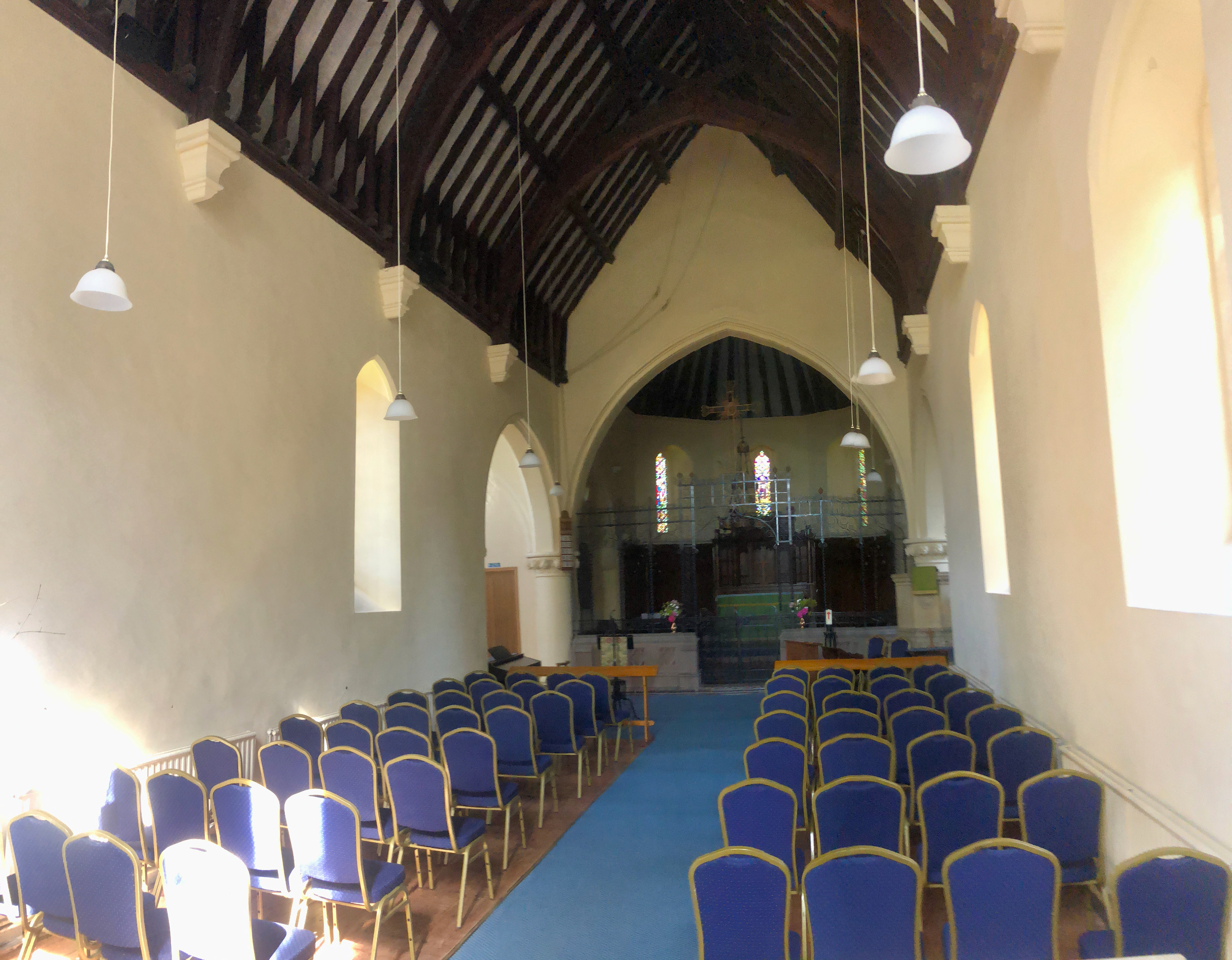
Rood screen at the Church of St Peter, Draycott, Somerset, 1894, which Historic England suggests may be by Prynne.
