= George Rundle Prynne =

British Anglo-Catholic cleric

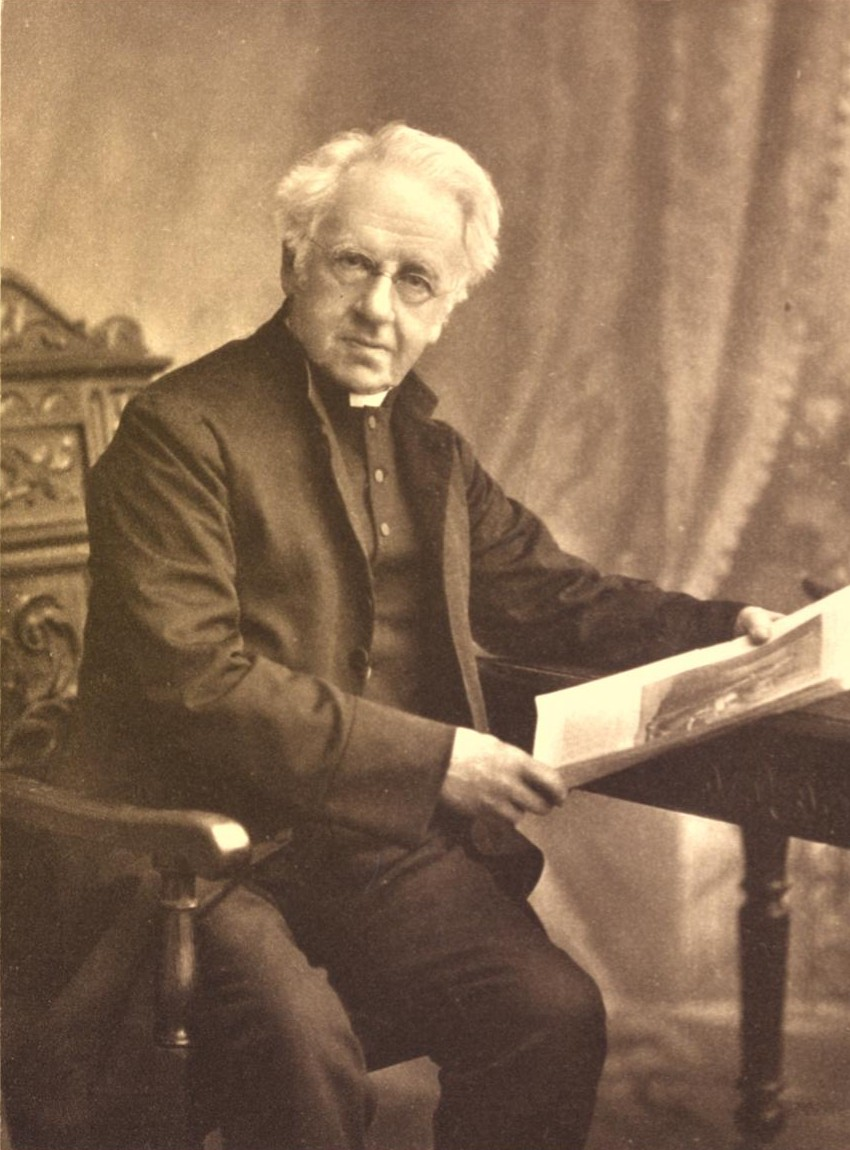
George Rundle Prynne

George Rundle Prynne (1818–1903) was a British Anglo-Catholic cleric in south-west England, known for his Tractarian and ritualist views. He is also notable as a hymn-writer: his "Jesu(s), Meek and Gentle" ranked with "Jesus Loves Me" and "Near the Cross" for American Protestants in the later 19th century".

== Early life ==
Born at West Looe, Cornwall, on 23 August 1818, he was a younger son in the family of eight children of John Allen Prynn from Newlyn and his wife Susanna, daughter of John and Mary Rundle of Looe: he later changed the spelling of his surname - (a)'pRynn being Cornish for 'Rynn's son'. He was education first at a school run by his sister in Looe, then at Devonport Classical and Mathematical School. He matriculated at St John's College, Cambridge, in October 1836, but migrated to Catharine Hall, graduating B.A. on 18 January 1840. He graduated M.A. in 1861, and M.A. ad eundem at Oxford on 30 May 1861).

Ordained deacon on 19 September 1841, and priest on 25 September 1842, Prynne was licensed as curate first to the parish of Tywardreath in Cornwall, and on 18 December 1843 to St Andrew's Church, Clifton, Bristol. There he first came in contact with Edward Pusey, whose views he adopted and publicly defended; but he declined Pusey's suggestion to join St Saviour Church, Richmond Hill in Leeds, because of an implied obligation of celibacy. On the nomination of the prime minister, Sir Robert Peel, he became vicar of the parish of Par, Cornwall, newly formed out of that of Tywardreath, from October 1846 to August 1847, when he took by exchange the living of St Levan with St Sennen.

== Contention in Plymouth ==
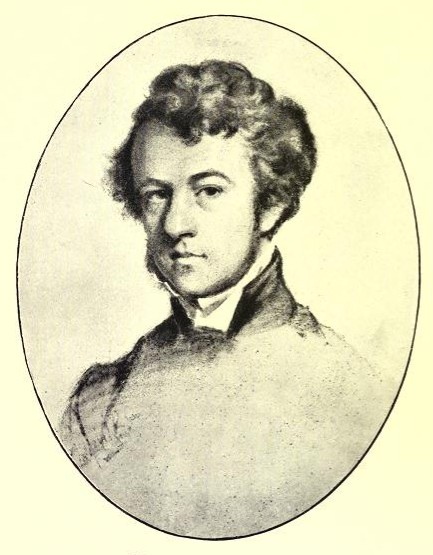
George Rundle Prynne, 1849 drawing

From 16 August 1848 until his death, Prynne was the incumbent of the new parish of St Peter's Church, Plymouth, which had been Eldad Chapel. The chapel was built from 1828, in the Five Fields area next to the Royal Naval Hospital, Stonehouse, for John Hawker (1773–1846), a priest who had left the Church of England over the issue of Catholic emancipation. The parish contained poorer districts, and Prynne worked in its slums. The Five Fields area as drawn by J. M. W. Turner in 1813 was open land; it is now the location of Wantage Gardens, East Stonehouse.

=== Anti-Tractarian feeling ===
Prynne's advocacy of Anglican Catholicism on Pusey's lines involved him in heated controversy. With nearby Devonport and Saltash, Plymouth at this time has been called a notable centre of "ultra-Evangelicalism". The conflict was largely fostered by John Hatchard. He was an evangelical, vicar of St Andrew's Church, Plymouth, and son of John Hatchard (1769–1849) the publisher. From 1848 he sought to undermine Henry Phillpotts, the bishop of Exeter, attacking William Maskell, domestic chaplain to Phillpotts and involved in the Gorham case. The effect was to suggest Phillpotts was a supporter of the Tractarians. That was a misconstruction of the bishop's wish to stay within a strict interpretation of the rubrics in liturgical matters.

=== Cholera and the Anglican Sisters ===
The 1846–1860 cholera pandemic resulted in a cholera outbreak in Plymouth in 1849. Prynne was a supporter of Priscilla Lydia Sellon and her Devonport community of Anglican Sisters of Mercy. He worked with them in ministering to the sick, and became confessor to girls in Sellon's orphanage.

Prynne had as assistant-curate George Hilhouse Hetling, from 1849 to 1852. Hetling was a Bristol surgeon, had worked in the gaol there, and had much experience of cholera. He was ordained deacon by Phillpotts in 1849, and wrote in high praise of the Sisters. Prynne himself later wrote:

On S. Peter's parish, comprising as it does some of the lowest and most densely-populated parts of Plymouth, the pestilence raged with special severity. For three months we seemed to be living amongst the living and the dead.

The cholera deaths recorded in Plymouth during the outbreak, from July to November 1849, numbered 819. There were temporary cholera hospitals in Five Fields.

=== Prynne in court ===
In 1850 Prynne brought a charge of criminal libel against Isaac Latimer, owner and editor of the Plymouth and Devonport Weekly Journal, over an article prompted by religious differences which seemed to reflect badly on him (24 January 1850). The trial took place at Exeter, before Mr. Justice Coleridge, on 6 and 7 August 1850, and excited bitter local feeling.

Latimer as defendant alleged that the English Church Union was responsible for the prosecution and funding it. The jury found the defendant not guilty, and the costs which Prynne incurred caused him financial troubles. In 1852, Prynne's support of Lydia Sellon, together with his advocacy of auricular confession and penance, provoked a pamphlet war with the Rev. James Spurrell and the Rev. Michael Hobart Seymour. Both Spurrell and Seymour were campaigners active at that time against the restoration of Anglican religious orders, particularly female orders.

An inquiry on 22 September 1852 by Phillpotts into the allegations against Prynne's doctrine and practice worked out in Prynne's favour. It took place in the Royal Hotel, Plymouth. Three girls to whom Prynne had acted as confessor made public statements. Following suggestions of Pusey, who thought Prynne should be defended by a lawyer, and Phillpotts, Prynne was defended by the Rev. Frederick Darling, his curate: who concentrated on cross-examining the girls to test their statements. Much of the content of the confessions was of a sexual or obscene nature, including an alleged incest with an older brother, and was not made public. Criticisms were published by the Rev. Joseph Hemington Harris, vicar of Tormoham, writing as "Presbyter Anglicanus", and by the Rev. Robert Henry Fortescue in correspondence with Pusey (1854, the year in which Fortescue became rector of Stockleigh Pomeroy).

A riot then took place when Phillpotts held a confirmation at St Peter's the following month.

== Later life ==
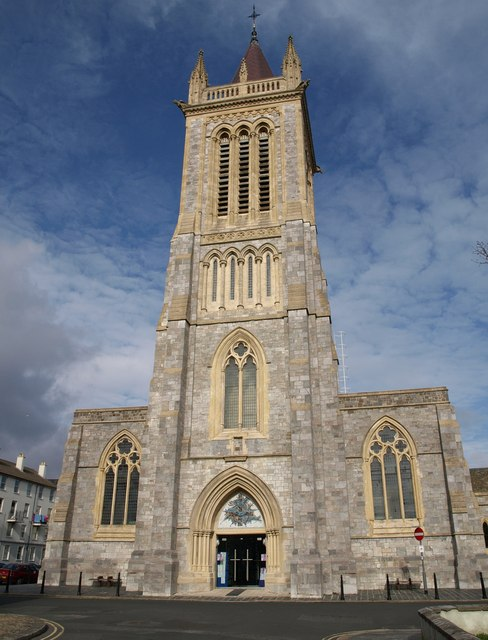
St Peter the Apostle, Plymouth, photograph from 2010

In 1860 Prynne employed Joseph Leycester Lyne, in an unpaid curacy, to which Lyne was ordained deacon. Lyne then moved on to St George in the East and Charles Lowder in London. That year Prynne joined the Society of the Holy Cross, and in 1861 the English Church Union 1862, becoming vice-president of the Union in 1901.

Meanwhile, local opposition diminished. Prynne's church was rebuilt, and the new building consecrated in 1882, without disturbance. Although he remained a Tractarian to the end, he was chosen with Prebendary Sadler proctor in convocation for the clergy of the Exeter diocese from 1885 to 1892, and despite their divergence of opinion he was on friendly terms with his diocesans, Frederick Temple and Edward Bickersteth. Unlike some other ritualists, he submitted to the Lambeth judgment of 1899, by the archbishops William Dalrymple Maclagan and William Temple, that condemned the liturgical use of incense.

Prynne died at his vicarage after a short illness on 25 March 1903, and was buried at Plympton St Mary.

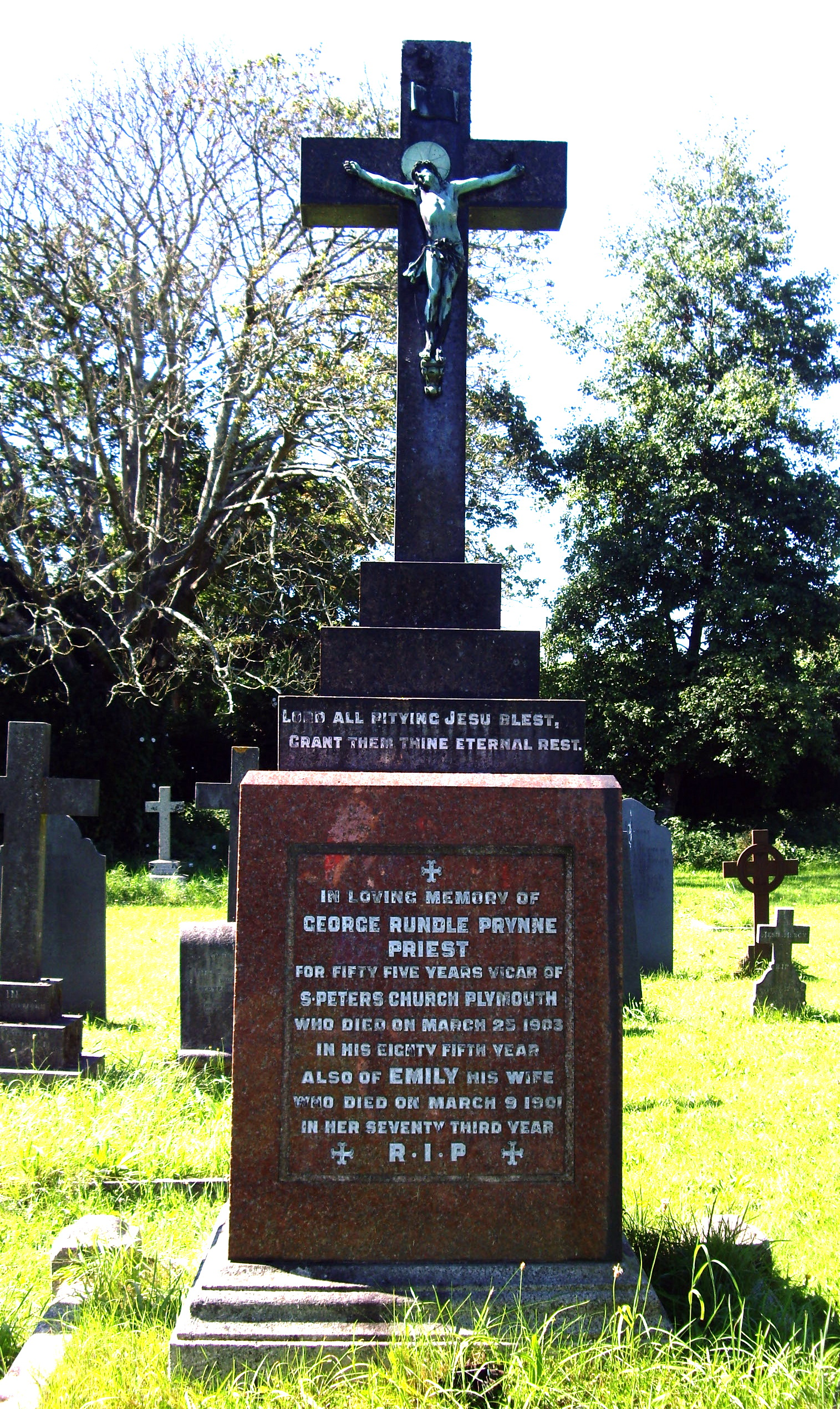
Grave of George Rundle Prynne

== Works ==
Prynne's major work was The Eucharistic Manual, 1865 (tenth and last edit. 1895); it was censured by the primate, Archbishop Charles Longley. He was also author of Truth and Reality of the Eucharistic Sacrifice (1894) and Devotional Instructions on the Eucharistic Office (1903). Other prose works consisted of sermons and doctrinal or controversial tracts.

As a writer of hymns Prynne enjoyed a reputation. A Hymnal compiled by him in 1875 contains his well-known "Jesu, meek and gentle", written in 1856, and some translations of Latin hymns. He also took part in the revision of Hymns Ancient and Modern, and published The Soldier's Dying Visions, and other Poems and Hymns (1881) and Via Dolorosa in prose, on the Stations of the Cross (1901).

== Family ==
Prynne married on 17 April 1849 Emily (died 1901), daughter of Admiral Sir Thomas Fellowes, and they had a family of four sons and six daughters. The sons Edward Arthur Fellowes Prynne and George Halford Fellowes Prynne were connected as artist and architect respectively with the plan and adornment of their father's church at Plymouth, and the Prynne memorial there, a mural painting, allegorically representing the Church Triumphant, is by Edward.
