= David Lucas (engraver) =

English mezzotint engraver

David Lucas (1802 – 22 August 1881) was a British mezzotinter, best known for his association with John Constable.

== Life ==
Lucas was born in Geddington Chase, Northamptonshire, and became a pupil of Samuel William Reynolds after a chance encounter in 1820. He moved to London as an apprentice, and had produced his work by 1827.

By 1829 Lucas knew John Constable, and worked intensively on engravings for Constable's Various Subjects of Landscape, Characteristic of English Scenery from 1830 to 1832. He continued to produce works for the family after Constable died in 1837.

Lucas died on 22 August 1881, in a workhouse in Fulham. His great niece was the artist Florence Lucas, who married the notable creator of etchings James Alphege Brewer, son of Henry William Brewer and brother of Henry Charles Brewer.

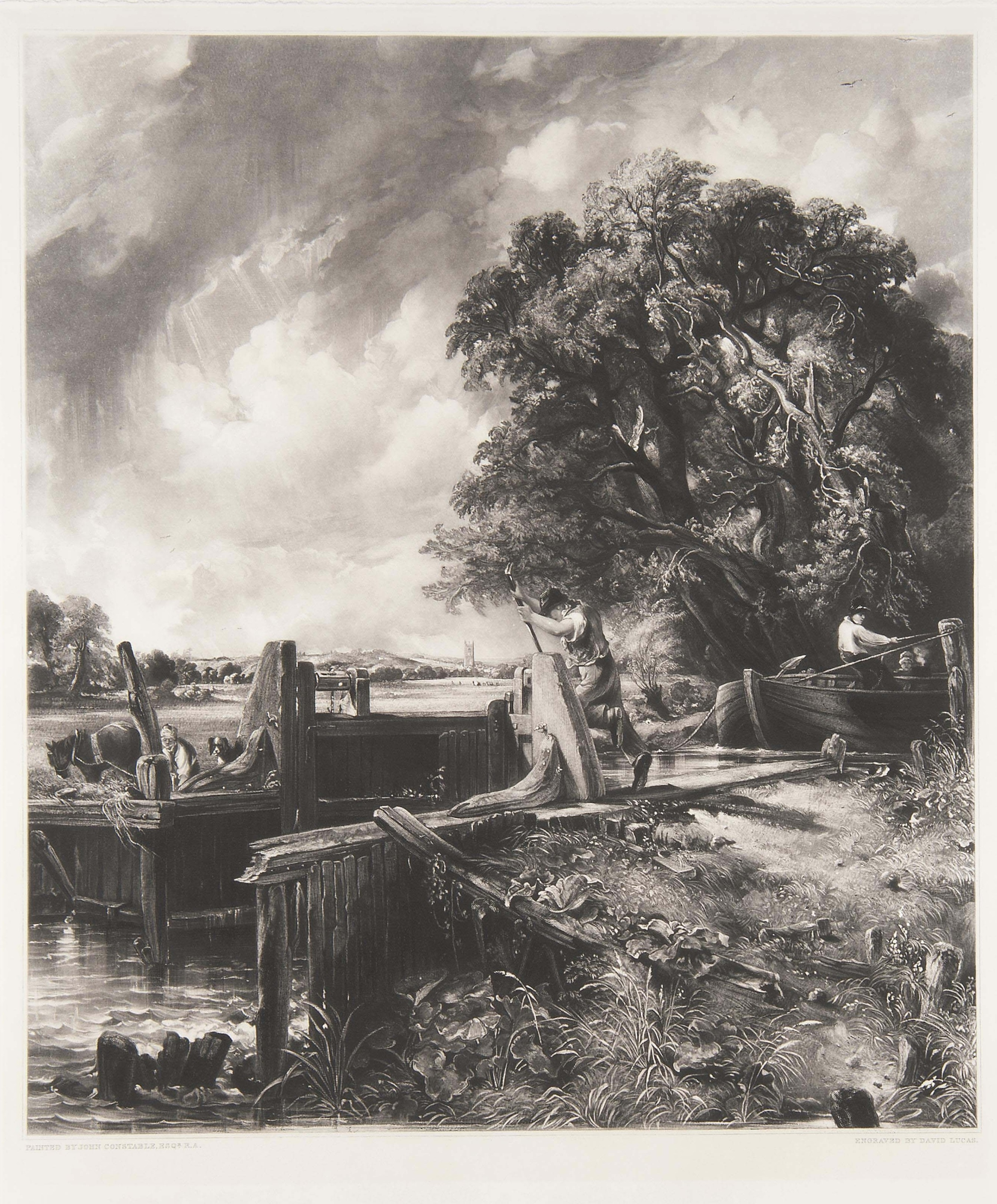
The Lock, and Dedham Vale (1834) by David Lucas, after John Constable

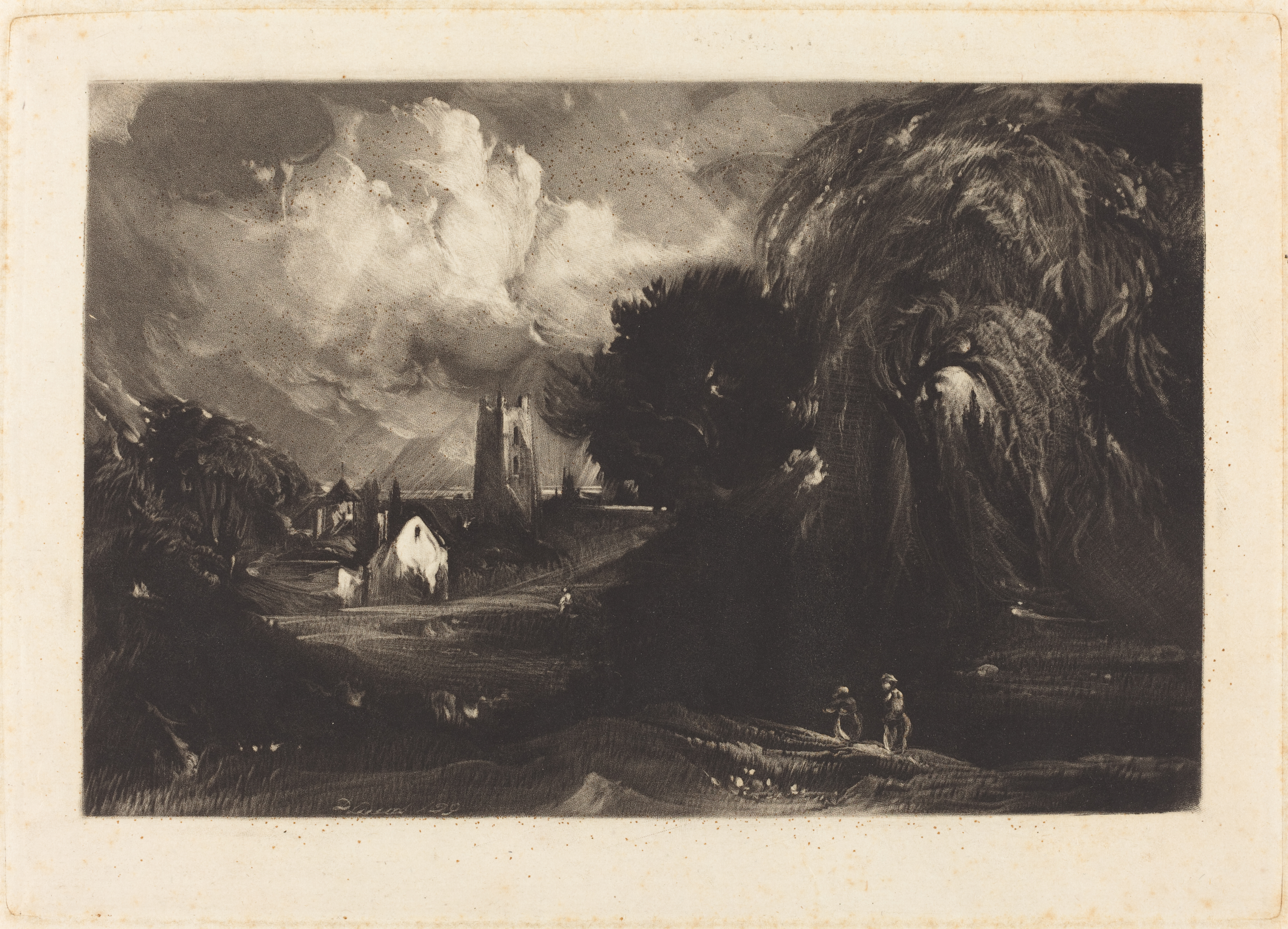
Stoke-by-Neyland by David Lucas, after John Constable, National Gallery of Art

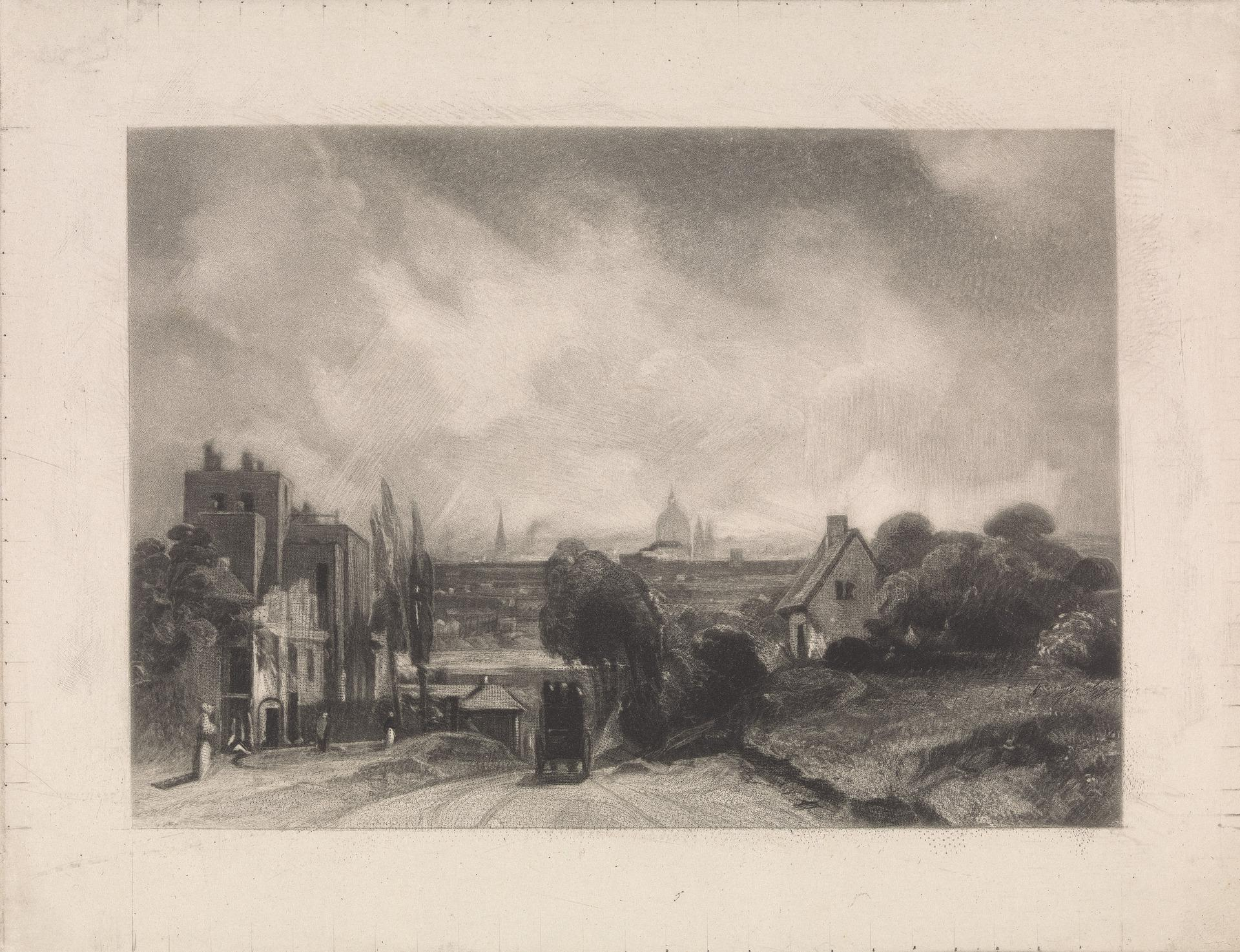
Sir Richard Steele's Cottage, Hampstead by David Lucas, after John Constable
