= John Francis Brewer =

English novelist and organist (1865–1921)

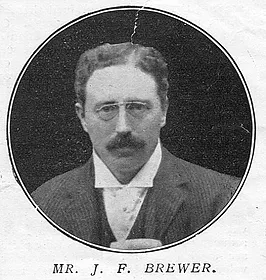
John Francis Brewer

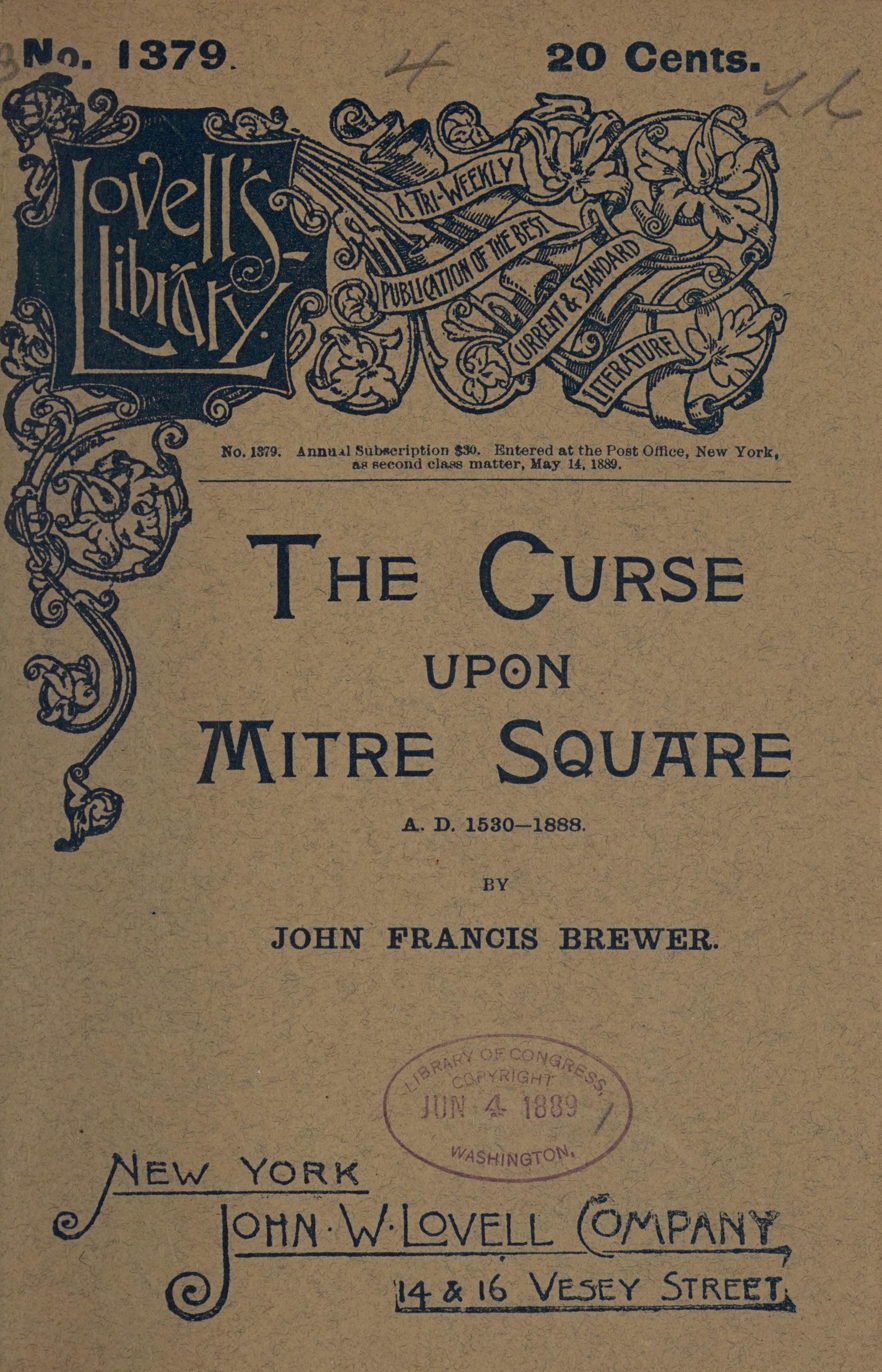
An American edition of ‘The Curse Upon Mitre Square’ written by John Francis Brewer in 1888

John Francis Brewer (November 25, 1864–June 15, 1921) was a late Victorian and Edwardian English novelist, journalist and organist.

== Family and early life ==
Brewer was born in Kensington, London, on 25 November, 1864. He was the eldest son of the architectural illustrator Henry William Brewer, and brother to the artists Henry Charles Brewer and James Alphege Brewer. Their grandfather was the historian John Sherren Brewer and their great uncle was E. Cobham Brewer, compiler of Brewer's Dictionary of Phrase & Fable. Brewer was educated at Kensington Catholic Public School and studied the organ privately with Robert Sutton-Sawby.

In June 1905, Brewer married Katherine, née Fuller, the widow of the late Henry Edyvean-Walker, the Squire of Bilton, Rugby, at St Mary of the Angels, Bayswater, in London. She had three sons from her first marriage, and was reputed to be an organist herself.

Brewer's father and paternal grandfather, John Sherren Brewer, were notable adherents of the Oxford Movement, inspired by Augustus Pugin and others. Henry William Brewer and his family, including John Francis Brewer, became high-profile converts to the Roman Catholic Church.

== Professional life ==
In 1881, at the age of just 18, Brewer was appointed as organist of the Jesuit Church of the Immaculate Conception, Farm Street, Mayfair in London. He held the post until 1916, when he was succeeded by the Belgian Guy Weitz, a student of Charles-Marie Widor and Alexandre Guilmant. Brewer was also a composer.

In additional to being an organist, Brewer was the author of "three very bright novels" (as described by the ‘Catholic Who’s Who and Year Book 1908’): 'The Speculators: A Comedy' (1897), an anonymous novel, and his best-known story, the short gothic novel, 'The Curse Upon Mitre Square' (1888), inspired by the Whitechapel Murders. The book was the first literary adaption of the Jack the Ripper murders, and was written and published at speed only weeks after Catherine Eddowes was killed in Mitre Square. Inspired by the architectural scenes of old London by Brewer's father, Henry William Brewer, Brewer Senior created a frontispiece for the book bearing his initials. The book remains in print.

Brewer contributed articles, including music criticism, to a number of magazines. In 1887 and 1888 he collaborated with the editor of The Girl's Own Paper, Charles Peters, describing excursions they had taken together which appeared in the publication. These included trips to Norway, Northern Italy (1887) and Central Italy (1888).

Brewer died on 15 June, 1921, aged 56.
