= Henry Brewer =

Henry Brewer may refer to:

- Henry William Brewer (1836–1903), British illustrator
- Henry Charles Brewer (1866–1950), his son, British painter
