= Sydney Ringer =

British medical researcher (1835–1910)

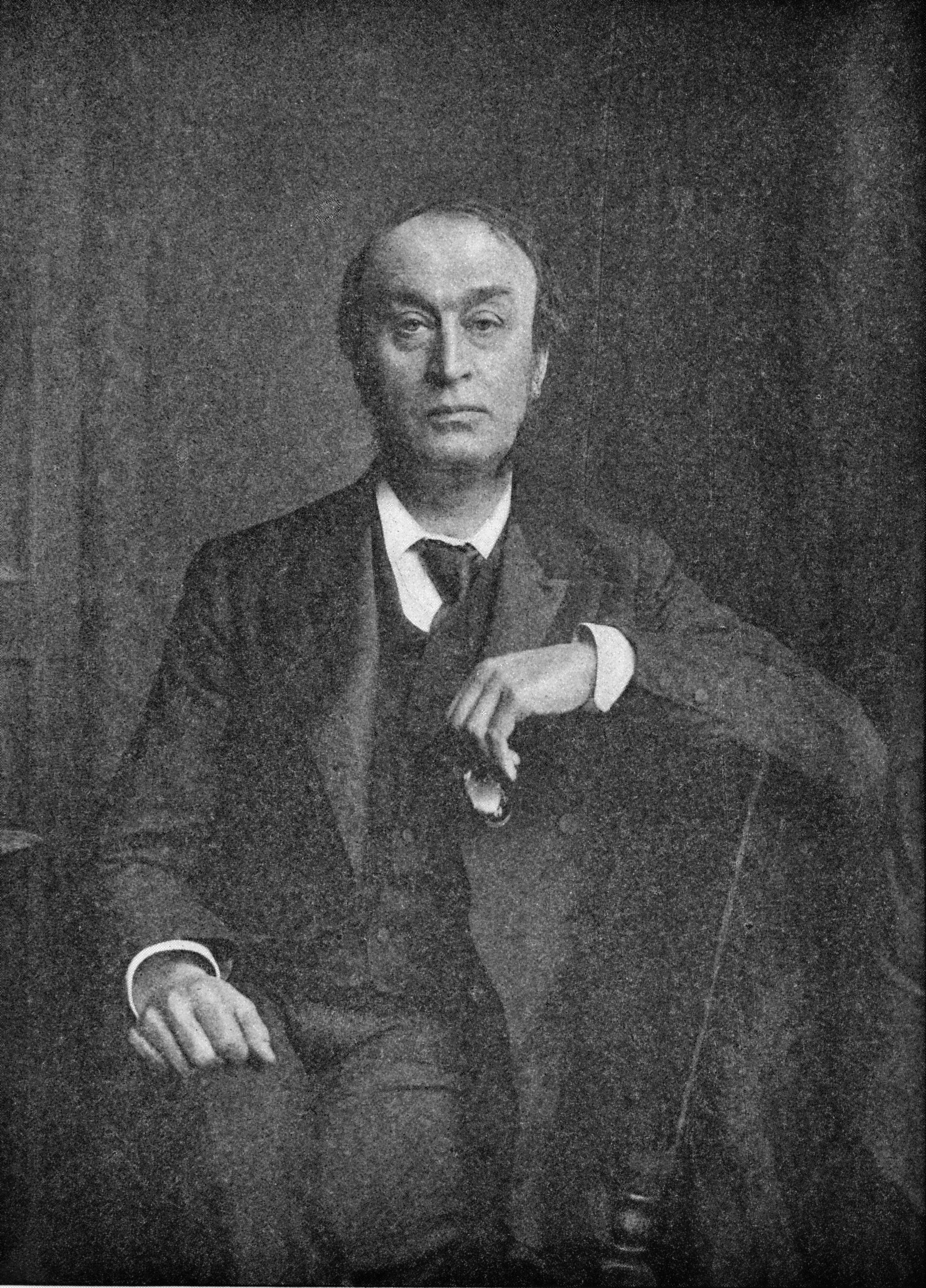

Sydney Ringer FRS (March 1835 – 14 October 1910) was a British clinician, physiologist and pharmacologist, best known for inventing Ringer's solution. He was born in 1835 in Norwich, England and died following a stroke in 1910 in Lastingham, Yorkshire, England. His gravestone and some other records report 1835 for his birth, some census records and other documents suggest 1836, but his baptismal record at St Mary's Baptist Chapel (referred to in Ringer's own will) confirms this was 1835.

== Life ==
Born into a nonconformist family (often, but incorrectly described as 'Quaker') in Norwich, Sydney Ringer grew up in poverty because, when he was still very young, his father died in 1843.

Ringer's early education was at a Baptist school in Norwich founded by the father of John Sherren Brewer Jr. His school fellows included the headmaster's grandson Henry William Brewer, later a notable architectural illustrator, as well as the orientalist Professor Robert Lubbock Bensly and the architect Edward Boardman. A significant teacher was JS Brewer's son, the hugely successful author Revd Dr Ebenezer Cobham Brewer.

Before starting at medical school, Ringer worked for a year, from September 1853, at the Norfolk & Norwich hospital under the surgeon, B H Norgate (who had signed his father's death certificate).

For his university education, as a non-conformist, Ringer studied medicine at University College London from 1854 and graduated in 1860. During this time, Ringer trained at University College Hospital before starting his professional career there. By 1866, Ringer had been promoted to full physician. From 1865 to 1869, Ringer also served as Assistant Physician at the Great Ormond Street Hospital for Children. His Handbook of Therapeutics (1869) eventually went into 14 editions.

During his academic career, Ringer became a Fellow of the Royal College of Physicians in 1870 and Fellow of the Royal Society in 1885. At UCH throughout his career, he served successively as professor of materia medica (1862-78), the Principles & Practice of Medicine (1878-87) and as the Holme Professor of Clinical Medicine from 1887 to 1900.

His most celebrated work in research was conducted at University College's incipient Department of Physiology. He established the minimal ionic composition (simple chloride salts of sodium, potassium and calcium) of a physiological saline. His demonstration of the necessity for extracellular calcium to sustain cardiac muscle contraction in the spontaneously beating frog heart was the first to reveal the physiological importance of calcium subsequently discovered for many cellular processes (see e.g. Calcium metabolism, Calcium in biology). This work provided the basis of Ringer's solution of which there followed many derivatives, modified to suit different species and experimental conditions. Clinically important derivatives include Ringer's lactate also known as Hartmann's solution.

He was also the first person to discover the parasitic infection of Paragonimus westermani or lung fluke on a human as he examined a Taiwanese patient in 1879. Thus Paragonimus ringeri serves as an alternative name for this species.

In 2007 (revised 2014, 2020) a brief biography of Ringer: A Solution for the Heart: a brief biography of Professor Sydney Ringer MD FRS (1835-1910) by DJ Miller was published by The Physiological Society, of which Ringer was an early member. A Blue Plaque to Ringer was unveiled at University College London in March 2022.

== Sources ==
- DeWolf, WC (1977). "Sydney Ringer (1835–1910)". Investigative Urology. 14 (6): 500–1. PMID 323186. (William C. DeWolf, MD, was the chief of urology at Beth Israel Deaconess Hospital for more than 35 years.) "William DeWolf Obituary (2021) - Southborough, MA - MetroWest Daily News". Legacy.com.
- Sternbach, George (1988). "Sydney Ringer: Water supplied by the new river water company". Journal of Emergency Medicine. 6 (1): 71–4. doi:10.1016/0736-4679(88)90254-5. PMID 3283218.
- Fye, W B (1984). "Sydney Ringer, calcium, and cardiac function". Circulation. 69 (4). American Heart Association: 849–53. doi:10.1161/01.CIR.69.4.849. PMID 6365353.
- Lee, J. Alfred (1981). "Sydney Ringer (1834?1910) and Alexis Hartmann (1898?1964)". Anaesthesia. 36 (12): 1115–21. doi:10.1111/j.1365-2044.1981.tb08698.x. PMID 7034584. S2CID 39014132.
- Miller, D. J. (2004). "Sydney Ringer; physiological saline, calcium and the contraction of the heart". The Journal of Physiology. 555 (Pt 3): 585–7. doi:10.1113/jphysiol.2004.060731. PMC 1664856. PMID 14742734.
- Moore, Benjamin (1911). "In Memory of Sidney (sic) Ringer 1835-1910: Some account of the Fundamental Discoveries of the Great Pioneer of the Bio-Chemistry of Crystallo-colloids in Living Cells". Biochemical Journal. 5 (6–7): i.b3–xix. doi:10.1042/bj005000i. PMC 1276368. PMID 16742174.
- "Obituary". The Lancet. 176 (4549): 1386–1387. 1910. doi:10.1016/S0140-6736(00)52779-2.
- Rolleston, Humphry Davy (1912). "Ringer, Sydney" . In Lee, Sidney (ed.). Dictionary of National Biography (2nd supplement). London: Smith, Elder & Co.
- "Sydney Ringer (1835-1910) Clinician and Pharmacologist". JAMA: The Journal of the American Medical Association. 206 (11): 2515. 1968. doi:10.1001/jama.1968.03150110063015.
- Ellis, Harold (2010). "Sydney Ringer: Physician, physiologist and pharmacologist". British Journal of Hospital Medicine. 71 (11): 645. doi:10.12968/hmed.2010.71.11.79664. PMID 21063259.
