= Robert Lubbock Bensly =

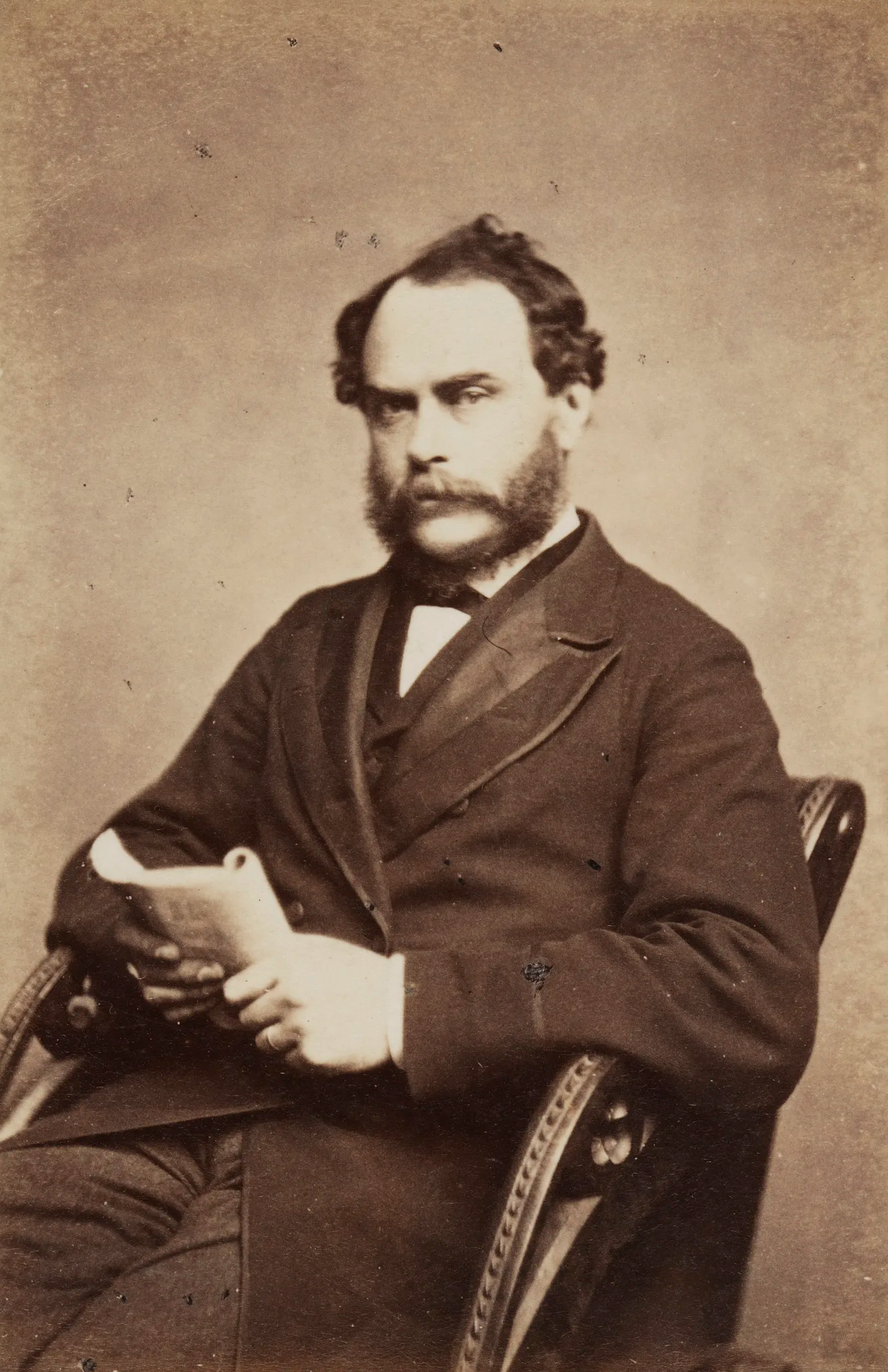
- Bensly in 1874
- Born: 24 August 1831; Eaton, Norfolk, England
- Died: 23 April 1893 (aged 61); Cambridge, Cambridgeshire, England
- Spouse: Agnes Dorothee von Blomberg (m. 1860)
- Children: 3

Academic background
- Education: King's College London; Gonville and Caius College, Cambridge

Academic work
- Discipline: Oriental studies
- Institutions: Gonville and Caius College; University of London

Robert Lubbock Bensly (born in Eaton, Norwich, England, 24 August 1831; died in Cambridge, 23 April 1893) was an English orientalist.

== Life ==
He was born at Eaton, near Norwich, on 24 August 1831. He was the second son of Robert Bensly and Harriet Reeve. He was educated at first in a Baptist private school in Norwich founded by the father of John Sherren Brewer. His school fellows included the headmaster's grandson Henry William Brewer, later a notable architectural illustrator, the clinician and physiologist Sydney Ringer and the architect Edward Boardman.

He was educated at King's College London, and Gonville and Caius College, Cambridge, studied in Germany, and was appointed reader in Hebrew at Gonville and Caius College in 1863. He was elected Fellow in 1876; became lecturer in Hebrew and Syriac in his college; was made Lord Almoner's Professor of Arabic in 1887; examiner in the Hebrew text of the Old Testament in the University of London.

He was a member of the Old Testament Revision Company; and accompanied Mrs. Lewis and Mrs. Gibson on the 1893 trip to Saint Catherine's Monastery in Egypt following the sisters' discovery there the previous year of a palimpsest of the Gospels in Syriac. Bensly, together with Francis Crawford Burkitt, played an important role in deciphering the text on this second trip.

He edited The Missing Fragment of the Latin Translation of the Fourth Book of Ezra, discovered and edited with an Introduction and Notes (Cambridge, 1875); contributed The Harklean Version of Heb. xi, 28–xiii, 25 to the Proceedings of the Congress of Orientalists of 1889; assisted in the editing of the Sinaitic palimpsest; edited IV Maccabees (to which he devoted twenty-seven years of labor), published posthumously (Cambridge, 1895); and edited St. Clement's Epistles to the Corinthians in Syriac (published posthumously; London, 1899).

== Family ==
On 14 August 1860 in Halle, Bensly married Agnes Dorothee, daughter of Baron Eduard von Blomberg, who, with three children, survived him. His eldest son, Edward von Blomberg Bensly (born 1863), was professor of Classics at the University of Adelaide in the years 1895-1905 and then professor of Latin at Aberystwyth College at the University of Wales.

His wife Agnes wrote Our Journey to Sinai: Visit to the Convent of St. Catarina, with a chapter on the Sinai Palimpsest (published London, 1896), the story of the couple's journey with the Gibson party in 1893.
