= Letters and Papers of the Reign of Henry VIII =

Letters and Papers of the Reign of Henry VIII (full title: Letters and Papers, Foreign and Domestic, of the Reign of Henry VIII: preserved in the Public Record Office, the British Museum, and elsewhere in England; often abbreviated in citations as L&P) is a multi-volume edition of documents from the reign of Henry VIII of England. The series was edited by J. S. Brewer, James Gairdner and R. H. Brodie, and originally published between 1862 and 1932. It remains a key resource for historians of the period, and is now freely available online as part of British History Online.

Surviving documents from the Public Record Office (now The National Archives), the British Museum (now the British Library), other archives, and reliable older publications, are presented in date order. The texts are calendared: that is to say, they are slightly summarised and edited, the language modernised, and some explanatory footnotes added; but all substantive content is retained. Undated documents are printed at the end of the assumed month or year. Grants and payments from accounts are also inserted at the end of their respective months.

The earlier State Papers of Henry VIII, published by the Royal Commission for State Papers in 11 volumes between 1830 and 1852, is not wholly superseded because the editors of that series sought to reproduce the original phrasing and orthography of the selected letters.

== Publication history ==
The first volume, edited by Brewer and covering the years 1509 to 1514, was published in 1862. Brewer also edited the next three volumes, covering the years 1515 to 1530, published in a total of eight parts between 1864 and 1876. Following Brewer's death in 1879, Gairdner edited the next nine volumes (5–13), covering the years 1531 to 1538, which appeared in a total of eleven parts between 1880 and 1893. Gairdner and Brodie jointly edited the next eight volumes (14–21), covering the years 1539 to 1547, published in a total of thirteen parts between 1894 and 1910.

This brought the series down to the end of the reign of Henry VIII, but by this date a number of new documents had been discovered, and the first volume in particular was felt to be defective. A second, greatly expanded, edition of Volume 1 was therefore published in three parts (two volumes of text and an index) in 1920. Two further volumes of Addenda were published in 1929 and 1932. A full set of the series therefore amounts to 21 nominal volumes, plus two volumes of Addenda; but in physical terms (with Volume 1 represented by the second edition) it amounts to a total of 37 volumes.

A full reprint of the series was issued by the Kraus Reprint Co. in 1965.

The full text is also available online as part of British History Online.
