= Acton Cemetery =

Historic burial ground in London

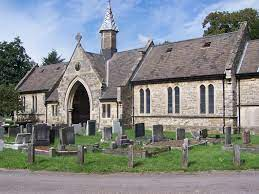
Acton Cemetery in the London Borough of Ealing

Acton Cemetery is an historic late–Victorian burial ground in the London Borough of Ealing. Managed by Ealing London Borough Council, the site is located in North Ealing, near to North Acton Underground Station.

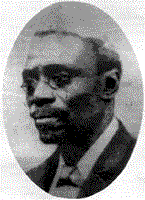
Sir Samuel Lewis (barrister), a founder of modern Sierra Leone

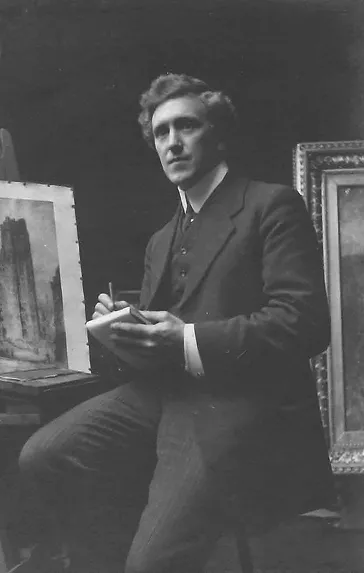
Creator of etchings James Alphege Brewer was buried in Acton Cemetery in 1946

History

The land for the Cemetery was purchased in 1893 by the Acton Urban District Council. It was previously part of Lower Place Farm. Two chapels were built in 1895, and the 6.5 acres were consecrated and opened for burials that year.

The Metropolitan District Railway (now the Central Line) was built through the site in 1903, dividing the cemetery into two halves, connected by a metal bridge. More stations along the line as a result of the construction of a new Royal Agricultural Show site made the cemetery more accessible. Opened in 1903 by the Prince of Wales, the show site gave its name to the area now known as Park Royal

The cemetery has a war memorial, and 143 graves relating to WWI and WWII are recorded at the site by the Commonwealth War Graves Commission.

Notable People Buried & Memorialised

- Stephen William Barrett (1855–1924) a prominent British music-hall performer who used the stage name Lester Barrett. He was the elder brother of the celebrated composer Leslie Stuart.
- The watercolour artist Henry Charles Brewer (1866–1950) lived on Perryn Road in Acton. Brewer executed the wall paintings at St Peter's Church, Ealing. He is buried in the northern section of the cemetery, near to his brother James Alphege Brewer.
- The notable creator of etchings, James Alphege Brewer (1881–1946), who lived on Avenue Road in Acton is buried in the northern section of the cemetery, near to his brother Henry Charles Brewer.
- Sir K. A. C. Creswell (1879–1974), was an English architectural historian who wrote seminal works on Islamic architecture in Egypt.
- Jamal Edwards (1990–2022). English music entrepreneur. Served as an ambassador for the Prince's Trust and awarded an MBE in 2015.
- Francis Robert Japp (1848–1925), was a British chemist noted for his discovery of the Japp–Klingemann reaction in 1887.
- Sir Samuel Lewis (barrister) (1843–1903), was the first West African to be knighted in Great Britain, and a founder of modern Sierra Leone.
- Albert Norris Perry, who died in 1915 in the sinking of the Lusitania. His memorial has a lifebelt around it.
- George Lee Temple (1892–1914). Born in Acton, Temple was first Englishman to fly upside down and the youngest at the time (1914) to fly from London to Paris.
- Susan Mary Yeats (d. 1900). Yeats was the mother of Nobel Prize Winner for literature and poet, William Butler Yeats. She died in France and is buried in Drumcliff.
