= Ealing Art Group =

Art group based in the United Kingdom

The Ealing Art Guild was founded in 1910, to further the interests of local artists of all disciplines, whether professional, amateur or lay. The society later broadened its scope to become the Ealing Arts Club and, in due course, became the present day Ealing Art Group, which has a membership of around 120.

== Origins and development ==
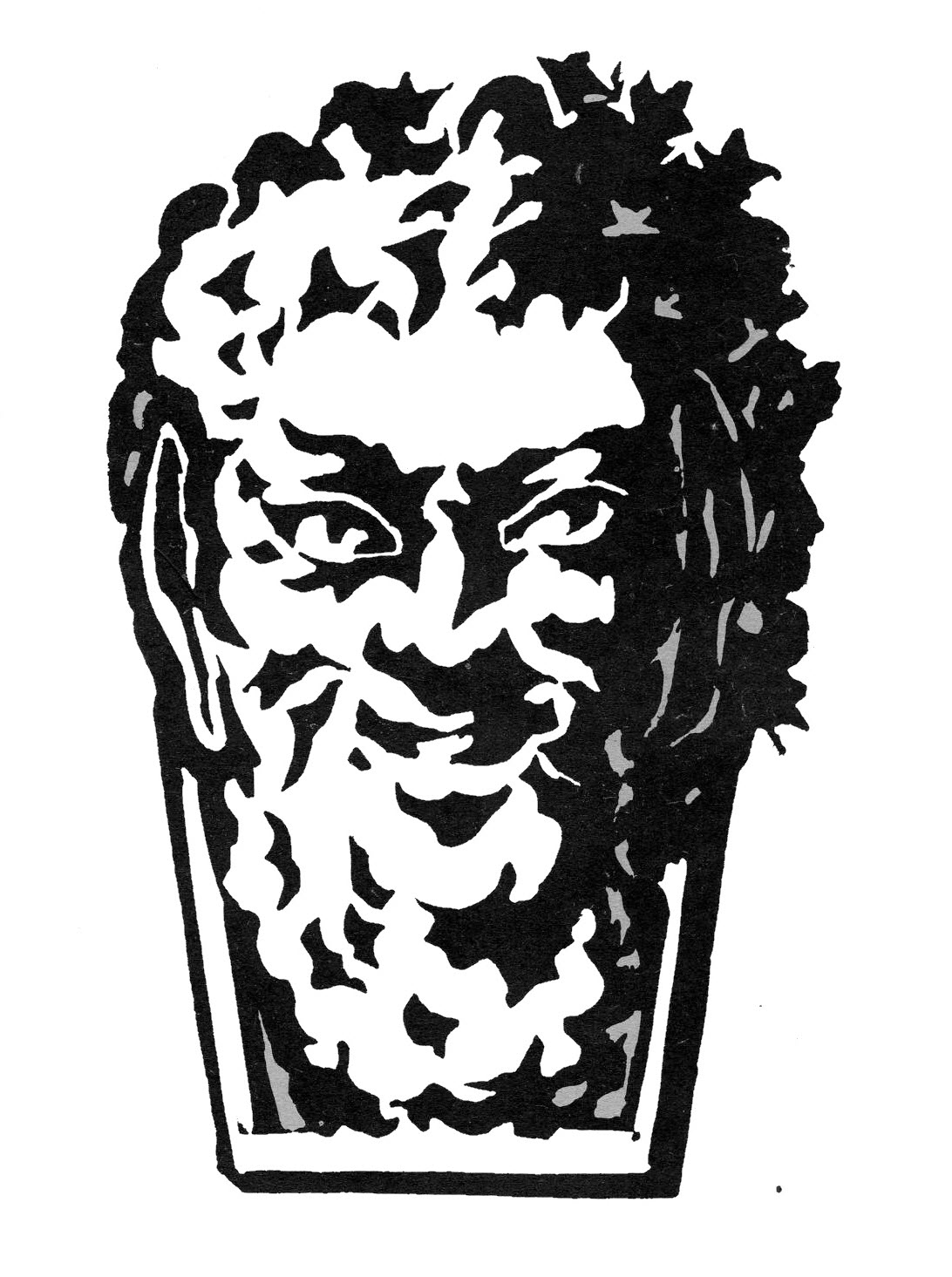
Original logo of Ealing Art Guild

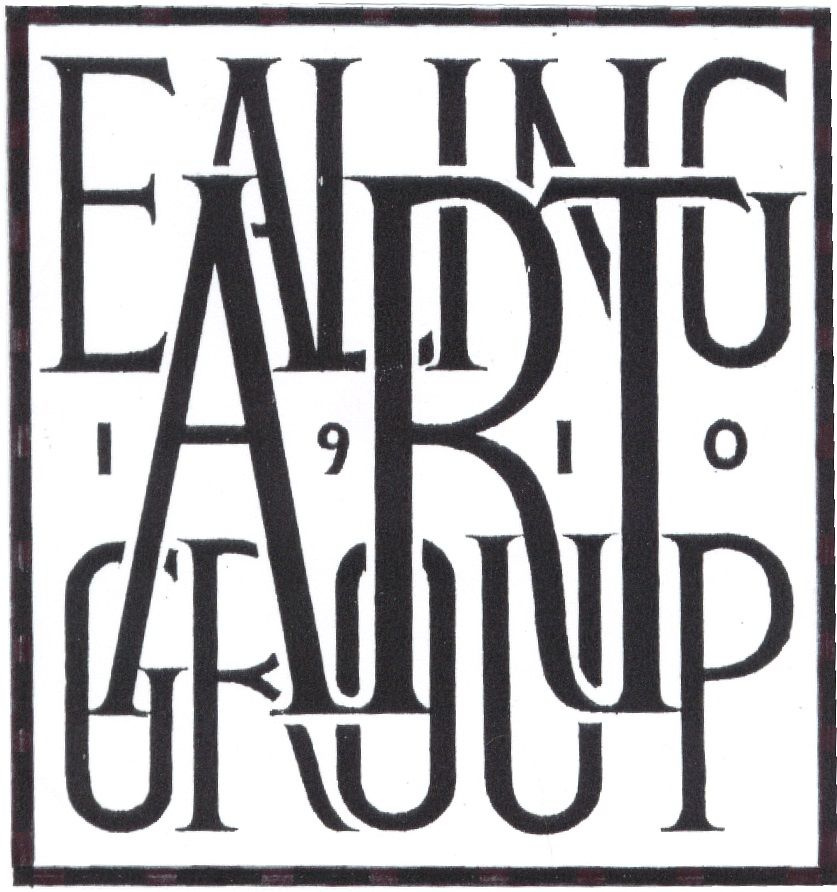
Current logo of Ealing Art Group

The original logo was based on a carving on a bench in Walpole Park. The current logo was introduced in the 1990s.

According to an early history of the club, written by J. Lawson Petingale to celebrate its first 50 years, John Dovaston and Arthur Sortwell had the idea of forming a local art society in July 1910. On 15 November a group gathered in the studio of Dovaston’s sister Margaret to discuss and constitute the Ealing Art Guild, with Margaret appointed its secretary, and Adolphus (her father) the chairman – a position he held until 1935, when he became president. On 29 November the Committee of Management met to draw up rules for the new organisation, the second of which stated "That the Guild do consist of Local Painters, Sculptors, Architects, Designers, Etchers, Engravers, Black and white Artists, and Artcraft workers (Professional and Amateur) and Lay Members."

In December 1921 the committee recommended that the guild's name be changed to the Ealing Arts Club, to reflect its expansion. The new name was adopted at a reception and general meeting on 22 January 1922, with the formation of the Drama and Music Sections. In 1932 the Amenities Group was added, and became active in the borough by writing letters and agitating for the retention of historic structures in Ealing, at a time when much new development was underway. The club expanded again when the Literature Group came into being in 1948; and all Sections were renamed Groups at the same time. The minutes record, however, that there was a growing wish among the artist members to become more independent, both organisationally and financially. Separation from the Ealing Arts Club came in 1983, with Bert Wright, PPRSA, FRSA chairing the new Ealing Art Group, and Charles Gould its secretary. (Note: Mrs June Gould, secretary of the Ealing Art Group) The group devised its own logo at the time, which was redesigned by EAG member Peter Averson-Maunder in the 1990s. The remaining Ealing Arts Club gradually disbanded after the separation.

=== Present at first meeting ===
The original list, in the meeting minutes, did not include given names. The identities and addresses of some participants have been derived from the 1911 census.

- Miss Austen
- Miss Baker
- Mr. Beckett
- Violet Mary Common (1869–1952) (Note: Watercolourist. Eldest daughter of Andrew Ainslie Common, living at 63 Eaton Rise, Ealing.)
- James Billington Coughtrie (1838–1920) (Note: Watercolourist, known for his English landscapes and Chinese junks. Born in Manchester. Married with 6 daughters and 2 sons, all born in Hong Kong, where he was Secretary, China Fire Insurance.)
- Miss Coughtrie (Note: Could have been one of three daughters (Constance, Kate Ruskin or Phyllis), all of whom had exhibited at the Woman’s Exhibition, Earls Court in 1900.)
- Lewis Croke (1875–1945) (Note: Pastellist, engraver (dry-point), and lithographer. Married to Constance Nora Anne Radcliffe Pontifex, author. From 1927 to 1932 he exhibited in Paris at the Salon des Artistes Français, where he showed dry-point engravings and lithographs, and at the Royal Cambrian Academy of Art in 1928.)
- Mr. How Davey
- Adolphus Dovaston (1859–1953)
- John Dovaston (1886–1963)
- Margaret Isabel Dovaston (1884–1954)
- Madeline Emily Green (1884–1947)
- Mabel Cacilie Green (1887–1944) (Note: Sister of Madeline Emily. Birth registration shows her as Cacilie; probate register names her as Cecilie.)
- Mr. Howard
- Mr. Hughes
- Mr. Hulbert
- Miss Lambert
- Mrs. Norman
- Mr. Val Prince (1867–1947) (Note: Valentine Reginald Prince, artist, living at The Cottage, King Edwards Gardens, Acton.)
- Mrs. Val Prince (1866–1941) (Note: Jessie Prince (née Williams), artist.<)
- Edward Arthur Fellowes Prynne (1854–1921) (Note: Trained in London, Antwerp and Italy, and produced portraits and genre paintings in a late pre-Raphaelite idiom that owes much to Sir E Burne-Jones. Also known for stained glass and decorative schemes for churches. Brother of architect George Fellowes Prynne. Lived at 1 Woodville Road, Ealing.)
- Mrs. Robinson
- Arthur Robert Sortwell (1890–1918) (Note: Arthur Robert Sortwell was a surveying student, living with his family at 17 Hamilton Road, Ealing. He died on 28 Feb 1918 – “Run over by motor lorry while proceeding to report to Bath Depot”. [Army Service Corps records])
- Miss Sortwell (Note: One of two sisters (Helena Beatrice and Frances Elsie) of Arthur Robert Sortwell.)
- Mr. Sutcliffe
- Miss Turner
- Mr. Wilkinson

== Some key office holders ==
President (Note: According to the minutes of the first meeting "It was resolved that the Secretary be instructed to invite Mr. F.W. Yeames, R.A. [sic], to become President of the Guild.” W. F. Yeames declined.)
1922–1929	Frederick Hall-Jones, FRIBA, FSI (Note: Frederick Hall Jones, FRIBA, FSI (1866–1938). Architect and surveyor, and son of Charles Jones, architect of Ealing Town Hall. Twice mayor of Ealing (1920–1922).)
1929–1935	T. C. F. Smith (Note: Thomas Charles Frederick Smith (1873–1957), bank manager, living at 8 Mortimer Road, Ealing.)
1935–1943	Adolphus Dovaston
1947–1953	Gilbert William Bayes
1954–1957	Harold Speed
1957–1964	Sir Albert Richardson, KCVO, FRIBA, FSA, RA
1964–	David Davis, MBE, MA, LRAM, ARCM
	Bert Wright, PPRSMA, FRSA
–2017	David Webster, SGFA, SAI

Chairman
1910–1935	Adolphus Dovaston
1935–1947	E. Marsden Wilson, ARE, ARCA
1947–1970	Doris Ingold (Note: Doris Ray Ingold (1896–1981), living at 20 Rosemont Road, Acton, W3. Her brother was the chemist Sir Christopher Kelk Ingold FRS)
1970–	Winifred Pickford
1983–	Bert Wright
–2017	Celia Busby

Treasurer
1910–1918	Unknown
1919–1928	T. C. F. Smith
1929–1947	Doris Ingold
1948–	Unknown
–2017	Celia Busby

Secretary
1910-1919	Margaret Dovaston
	Unknown
1953–	Irene Petingale (Note: Irene Florence Petingale (née Morris; 1911–1985) was co-author, with John Lawson Petingale, of “Miscellany,” the magazine of the Literature Group of the Ealing Arts Club from about 1947. They married in 1953, at which point she was appointed Secretary.)
–2017	June Gould

== Exhibitions ==
The first exhibition was hastily staged in Ealing Town Hall, in conjunction with a "Grand Shakespearean Bazaar", on 11 and 12 November 1910.

Thereafter, annual art exhibitions have been held every October/November from 1911, with the exception of the World War II years. Margaret Dovaston organised the first, and the 100th was held in 2015. The 102nd was held at St. Barnabas Church, Pittshanger Lane on 7–11 November 2017. A small number of exhibition catalogues still exist, and there are newspaper reports of a few others.

The 1911 exhibition opened on 23 October at St George's Hall. The works of nearly 40 local artists were displayed, with 200–300 visitors per day attending. But it proved to be very expensive, and so later exhibitions were held in Ealing – in the Town Hall or nearby in The Mall. In 1954, the venue moved to Ealing College in the Avenue. In 1931 the club held a seven days’ celebration of its coming of age, inaugurated when Terrick Williams, A.R.A. opened the annual exhibition. The Sunday Times reported that

The exhibits in this year’s exhibition number nearly 200, and reveal a high quality of work and a wide catholicity of taste. Among the examples most admired by the visitors were those of Mr. and Mrs. James Alphege Brewer, Mrs. Ethel M. Found, (Note: Ethel Miriam Found (née Martensen) (1885–1971), etcher, wife of James A. Found, artist & designer, printing trades. Both from Hull.) Miss Elizabeth King, Miss Margaret Dovaston, and Messrs. J. W. T. Vinall, Terence H. Lambert, (Note: Terence Henry Lambert (1891–1976), born Ealing. Originally a law student; later a painter, watercolourist, and etcher of landscapes and wildlife. Exhibited at the Royal Academy.) Henry Charles Brewer, T. W. Cole, (Note: Thomas William Cole (1857–), studied at Shrewsbury School of Art and Royal College of Art. Tutor to Margaret Dovaston at Ealing School of Art.) Albert H. Howe, (Note: Designer and departmental manager, Fine Art Publishing College.) Charles F. Angrave, Spencer H. Lawrence, and P. M. Andrews.

More recent exhibitions are illustrated on the Ealing Art Group's website.

== Early drama section productions ==
The Drama Section gave its first public performance in November 1923 at the Park Theatre, Hanwell, with a production of Gertrude Jennings’ popular comedy "The Young Person in Pink". On 24 November 1926, at the same theatre, the club staged "Twelfth Night", the proceeds from which were donated to a fund for replacing the Shakespeare Memorial Theatre, destroyed by fire in March of that year.

In 1927 the club's production of "She Stoops to Conquer" contributed to funds for the King Edward Memorial Hospital. Four years later – in the club's twenty-first year – came an ambitious and successful staging of "Up the Arts", a revue showing the arts through the ages, with more than 100 performers taking part. Painting, sculpture, poetry, music, literature, and drama were all represented in the scenes and tableaux. The book and lyrics were written by the president, Mr. T. C. F. Smith, with the incidental music, choruses, and solos composed by Mr. J. R. Parton. (Note: John Reginald Parton (1903–1977), clerk and chartered accountant, living at 6 Marlborough Road, Ealing.) A special overture was composed by Mr. Sherard J. H. Prynne. (Note: Lieutenant Sherard John Howard Prynne RM (1889-1953). His uncles were George Halford Fellowes Prynne, an eminent architect (FRIBA) living at 3 Grange Road, Ealing, and Edward Arthur Fellowes Prynne, the leading late Pre-Raphaelite painter, who lived at 1 Woodville Road, Ealing.)

== Music section ==
It is not known exactly when this section was formed, but an advertisement appeared in 1926 stating that "Amateur string players and vocalists living in or near Ealing would be welcomed as members of the Ealing Arts Club. Small string orchestra and madrigal choir. Harold E. West, 8. Liverpool Road, Ealing, W.5."
