= A Guide to the Scientific Knowledge of Things Familiar =

Book by E. Cobham Brewer

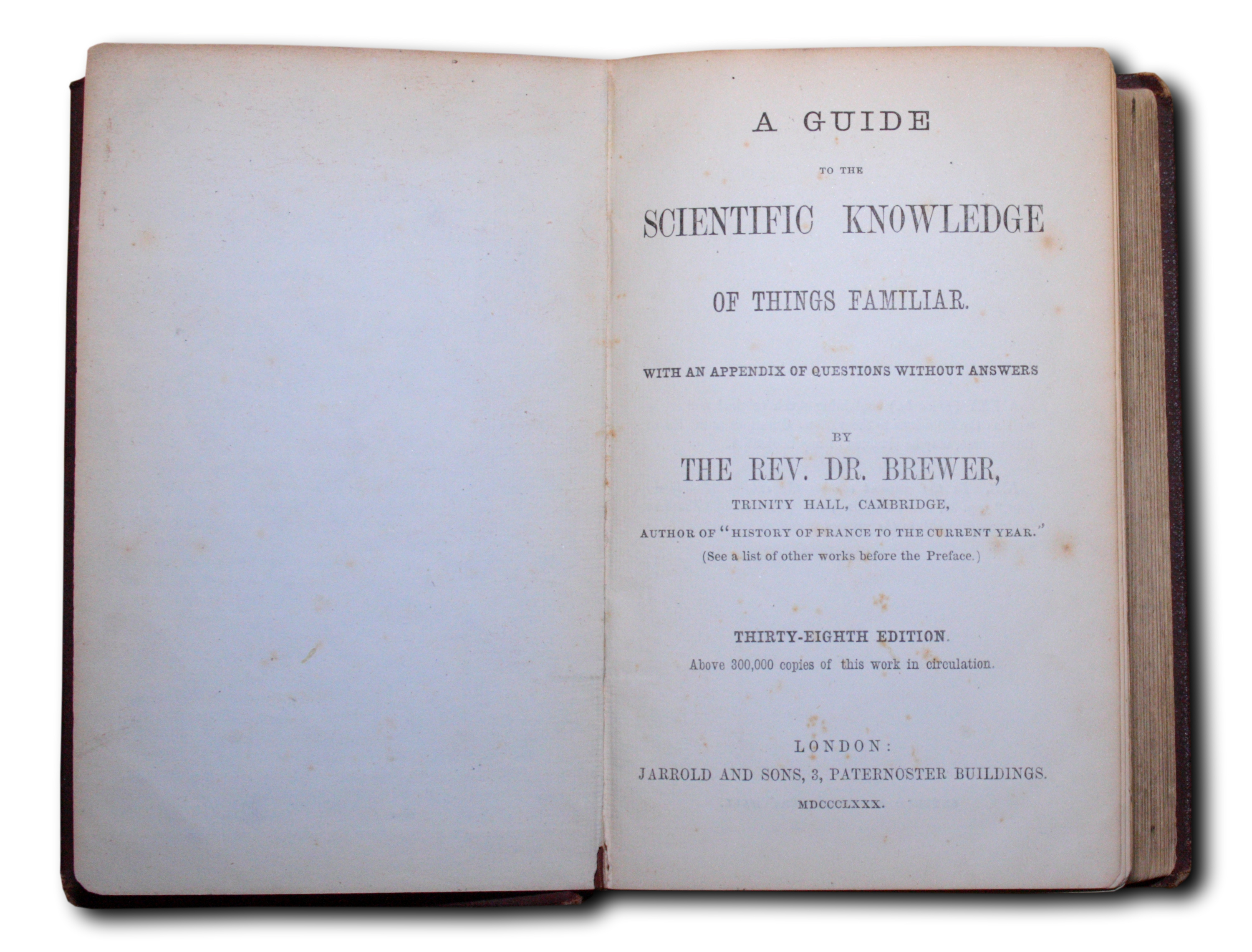
- Title page from the 38th edition published in 1880
- Author: Ebenezer Cobham Brewer
- Language: English
- Subject: Science education
- Publisher: Jarrold and Sons
- Publication date: 1840-47? (first edition)
- Publication place: United Kingdom

A Guide to the Scientific Knowledge of Things Familiar, also known as The Guide to Science or Brewer's Guide to Science, is a book by Ebenezer Cobham Brewer presenting explanations for common phenomena. First published in the United Kingdom around 1840, the book is laid out in the style of a catechism and proved very popular. 47 editions were printed by 1905 in English alone and translations made into various other languages. A revised version was produced for the US market which was digitised and republished in 2005 as part of Making of America IV: the American voice, 1850–1877.

Although it presented itself as an accurate science text, the book actually promotes religious ideas, including divine design.

The popularity of The Guide to Science enabled Brewer to gather material for his Dictionary of Phrase and Fable which remains a classic reference work.

== Content ==
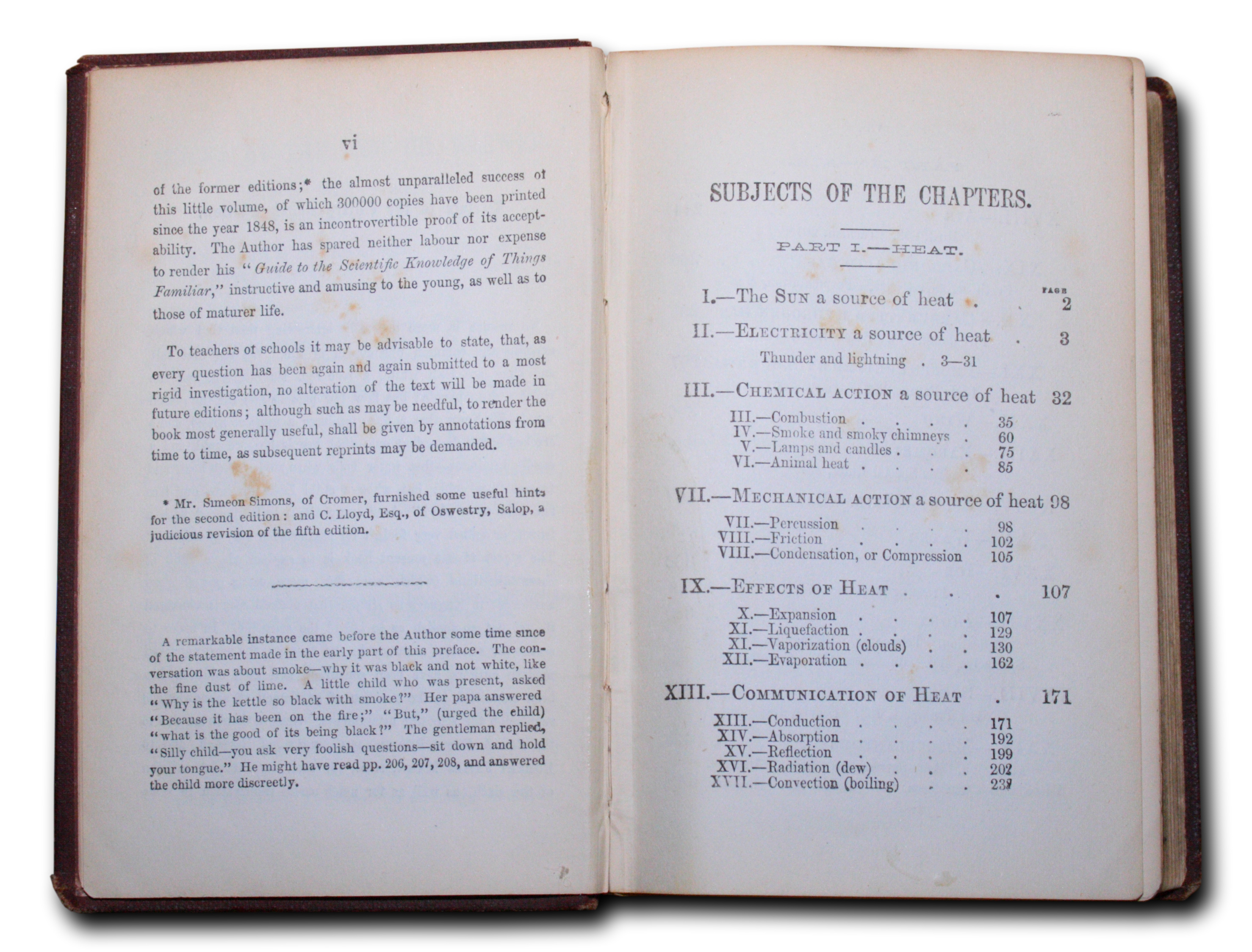
Pages vi and vii of the 38th edition including the first page of the contents

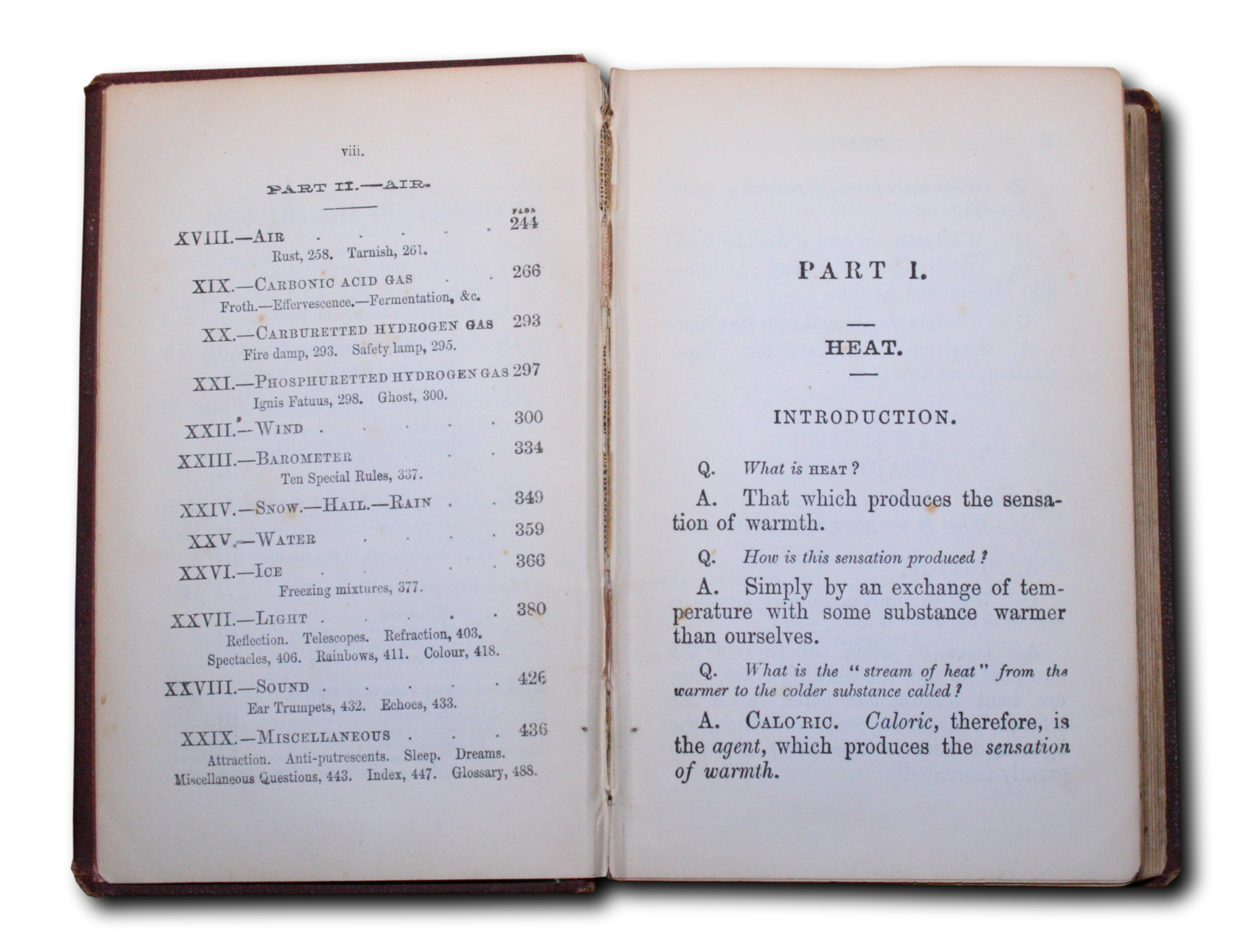
Page viii and 1 of the 38th edition including the second page of the contents

The object of The Guide to Science was to present answers to over 2000 questions about common phenomena. There are questions dealing with man-made objects such as candles, stoves and chimneys, as well as answers seeking to explain natural phenomena such as thunder, lightning (including a mention of ball lightning), clouds, dew, and rainbows. Brewer intended his book to be intelligible to a child, since children might often ask the questions he sought to answer, but not so simple as to offend the scientific.

The book is divided into two or three parts, depending upon the edition, each part having several chapters. Part one deals with questions relating to heat, such as the sources of heat and its effects on humans and animals, while Part two deals with questions relating to air, explaining why metal rusts in air, the operation of barometers, and the transmission of sound. A Miscellaneous section (Note: The Miscellaneous section is included as a third part in the 1864 US edition, but is presented as a further chapter of the second part in the 1880 edition.) deals with several more nebulous questions, including questions about sleep and dreaming. Within each part, the different chapters break the questions and answers up into subject areas organised thematically.

== History ==
The Guide to Science had its origin in a habit of Brewer's of making and saving notes from his reading. He set his notes out in a question-and-answer or catechism style, leaving a space for answers when they were obtained. Brewer bound his book into a volume and, disregarding advice from one man of science to burn it, sought to have it published. His initial offer to Thomas Jarrold to sell the copyright for 50 pounds was rejected. Instead, Jarrold agreed to publish the book under a profit sharing arrangement. The ultimate success of the book meant that this arrangement proved to be very profitable for both Brewer and Jarrold, with Jarrold later refusing to sell his share back to Brewer even when offered 4000 pounds.

Publication history
| Edition | Date | Print size |
|---|---|---|
| 1 | 1840–1847? | 2000 |
| 2 | 1848 | 3000 |
| 3 | January 1849 | 5000 |
| 4 | July 1849 | 7000 |
| 5 | 1850 | 8000 |
| 11 | 1857? | 8000 |
| 12 | 1858 | 8000 |
| 13 | 1859 | 4000 |
| 16 | 1862 | 4000 |
| 22 | 1866 | 4000 |
| 32 | 1874 | 4000 |
| 38 | 1880 | |
| 44 | 1892 | |
| 47 | 1905 | |

The exact date of the book's first publication is uncertain. Brewer believed it was 1840 but other sources suggest 1841 or as late as 1847. A second edition of the book was published in 1848 and two more in 1849. A total of 47 editions were published with the 47th edition appearing in 1905. The print runs were among the highest of any scientific book published in the second half of the 19th century, and Brewer said the success of the book was almost unparalleled at the time. Several translations of the book were made including a Spanish translation in 1858 and two French translations. The French translations were themselves translated into Swedish in 1858 and 1890 and into Portuguese in 1900.

An edited version of the book by Robert Evans Peterson was published in the United States in 1851 as Familiar Science; or, the Scientific Explanation of Common Things, with a revised edition following in 1863. These versions were edited and rearranged in order to make them more suitable for American pupils and were used as a text-book by schools in Pennsylvania and Brooklyn. Brewer wrote to Peterson expressing his satisfaction at the rearrangement but nevertheless prepared a revised edition of his own which was published in the US in 1864. This edition was digitised and republished by the University of Michigan Library in 2005 following a grant from the Andrew W. Mellon Foundation as part of Making of America IV: the American voice, 1850–1877.

== Religious perspectives ==
Brewer said that he consulted "the most approved modern authors" and submitted additions to "the revision of gentlemen of acknowledged reputation for scientific attainments". Nevertheless, religious rather than scientific answers to certain questions are prevalent in the book, particularly answers inferring divine design. For example, although modern theories of ice formation show that most of its unusual properties result from the hydrogen bond between neighbouring water molecules, Brewer suggested that the reason ice is lighter than water, expanding as it freezes, is because it has been "wisely ordained by God that water shall be an exception to a very general rule".

Brewer was ordained as a deacon and later as a priest and wished to provide a religious framework for science. He and many other Christian populist science writers of the time presented religious themes and were able to keep them relevant to modern science in the mind of the public even after the publication of On the Origin of Species in 1859. Part of Brewer's approach in promoting his ideas was to avoid discussing religious perspectives until about a third of the way into the book so that the introduction of these ideas would appear more natural.

== Reception and legacy ==
A review of the second edition of The Guide to Science was published by Punch magazine in 1850. The book was seen to be a "very useful little work", but in the typical Punch satirical style, the reviewer disagreed with one answer that we "feel a desire for activity in cold weather" due to "fanning combustion in the blood" by instead insisting that we feel a desire "to sit cosily over a fire in cold weather".

The success of The Guide to Science convinced Brewer that his readers still accepted religious explanations rather than evolutionary theory. Following the publication of On the Origin of Species in 1859, Brewer wrote Theology in Science; or The Testimony of Science to the Wisdom and Goodness of God (published in 1860) in order to demonstrate that evolution had not destroyed theological tradition and to continue The Guide to Science's promotion of natural theology. The book's popularity also resulted in Brewer being sent "a large number of questions on all imaginary matters". These questions and their answers became the nucleus of Brewer's Dictionary of Phrase and Fable, first published in 1870. This latter book has long outlived all of Brewer's other publications and remains a classic reference work.

== Bibliography ==
- Andrews, William (2008), Literary Byways, BiblioBazaar, LLC, ISBN 978-0-554-52804-5
- Brewer, E. Cobham (1864), A Guide to the Scientific Knowledge of Things Familiar (US ed.), Scholarly Publishing Office, University of Michigan Library, ISBN 1-4255-5648-5
- Brewer, E. Cobham (1880), A Guide to the Scientific Knowledge of Things Familiar (38th ed.)
- Evans, Ivor J. (1981), Brewer's Dictionary of Phrase and Fable (new and revised ed.), Cassell, ISBN 0-304-31589-3
- Ferguson, Chris D. (1999), From Past-Present to Future-Perfect: A Tribute to Charles A. Bunge and the Challenges of Contemporary Reference Service, Routledge, p. 80, ISBN 0-7890-0767-3
- Lightman, Bernard V. (2007), Victorian popularizers of science, University of Chicago Press, ISBN 978-0-226-48118-0
- Peterson, Robert Evans (1851), Familiar Science; or, the Scientific Explanation of Common Things, Robert E. Peterson & co.
- Peterson, Robert Evans (1863), Familiar Science; or, the Scientific Explanation of Common Things (revised ed.)
