= Francis Robert Japp =

British chemist

Francis Robert Japp FRS
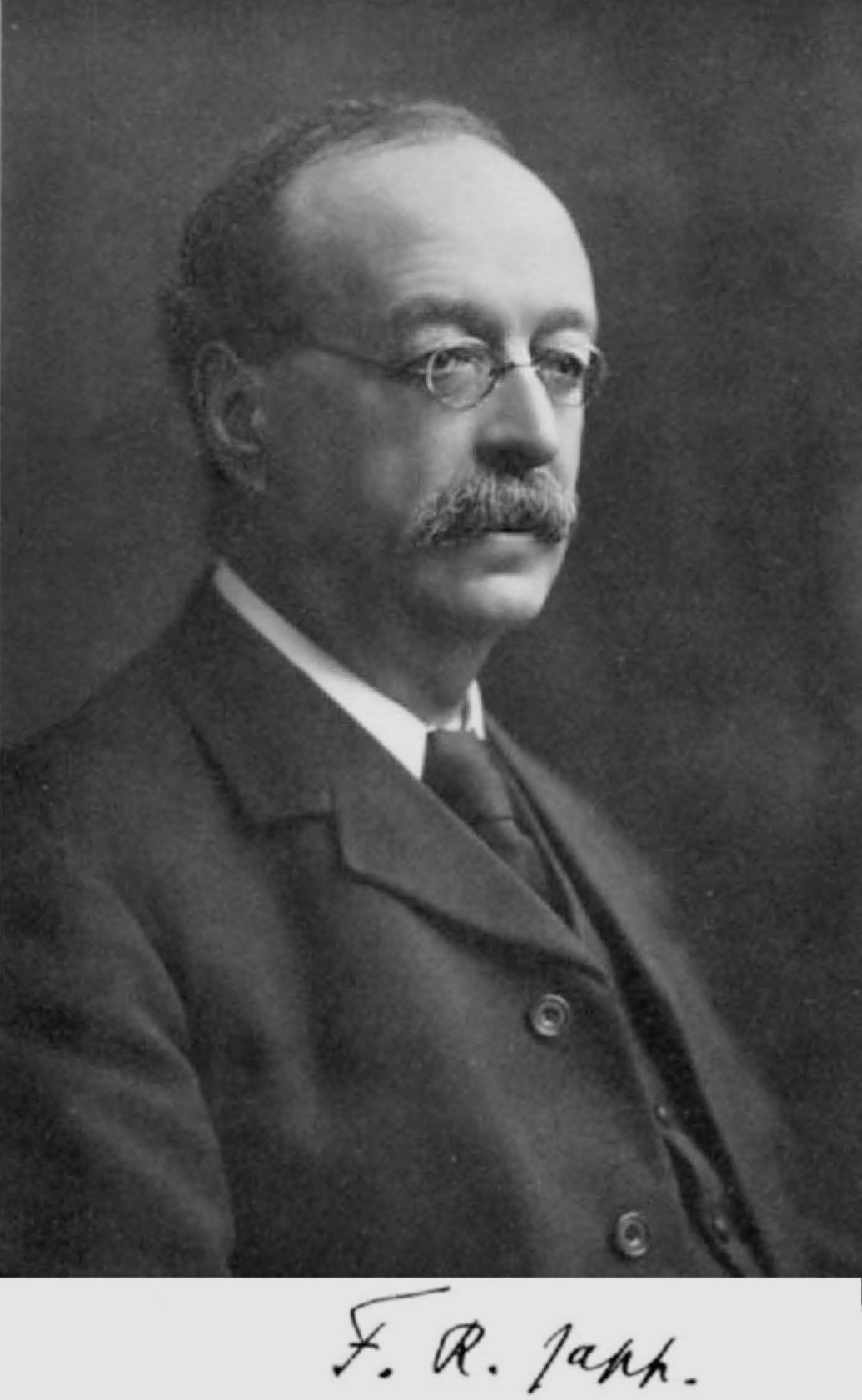
- Francis Robert Japp, FRS
- Born: 8 February 1848; Dundee Scotland
- Died: 1 August 1925 (aged 77); Richmond United Kingdom
- Education: University of St Andrews; University of Edinburgh; University of Heidelberg
- Known for: Japp-Klingemann reaction
- Spouse: Elizabeth Tegetmeyer
- Children: Margaret; Frances Mary; Alexander M Reginald Francis
- Awards: Longstaff Prize (1891)
- Scientific career
- Workplaces: University of Aberdeen
- Doctoral advisor: Robert Bunsen

Francis Robert Japp FRS (8 February 1848 – 1 August 1925) was a British chemist who discovered the Japp-Klingemann reaction in 1887.

He was born in Dundee, Scotland, the son of James Japp, a minister of the Catholic Apostolic Church. He graduated from St Andrews with an M.A. in 1868 and entered the University of Edinburgh as a student of law. He left the university because of health problems and stayed in Germany for two years from 1871 until 1873. After returning to England he decided to study chemistry. He started his studies at the University of Heidelberg with Robert Bunsen, where he received his PhD in 1875.

He joined the laboratory of August Kekulé at the University of Bonn the following year and after returning to Scotland in 1878 worked with Alexander Crum Brown at the University of Edinburgh. In 1881 Japp became assistant professor at the Royal School of Mines and Normal School of Science South Kensington and in 1890 Professor of Chemistry at the University of Aberdeen. In 1885 he was elected a Fellow of the Royal Society.

Japp married Elizabeth Tegetmeyer of Nordhausen in 1879, with whom he had two sons and two daughters. He retired in 1918. After the death of his younger son in 1920 and an operation the following year, his health deteriorated. He lost his eyesight in his final years, and died on 1 August 1925. He was buried at Acton Cemetery in West London on the 5th. Interred with him are:

- His wife Elizabeth (died 1936, aged 79)
- Reginald Francis (died 1920, aged 24)
- Margaret (died 1958, aged 78)
- Frances Mary (died 1969, aged 86)

It is not known what happened to the elder son, Alexander M, born in 1889.
