= Sir Richard Steele's Cottage, Hampstead =

Painting by John Constable

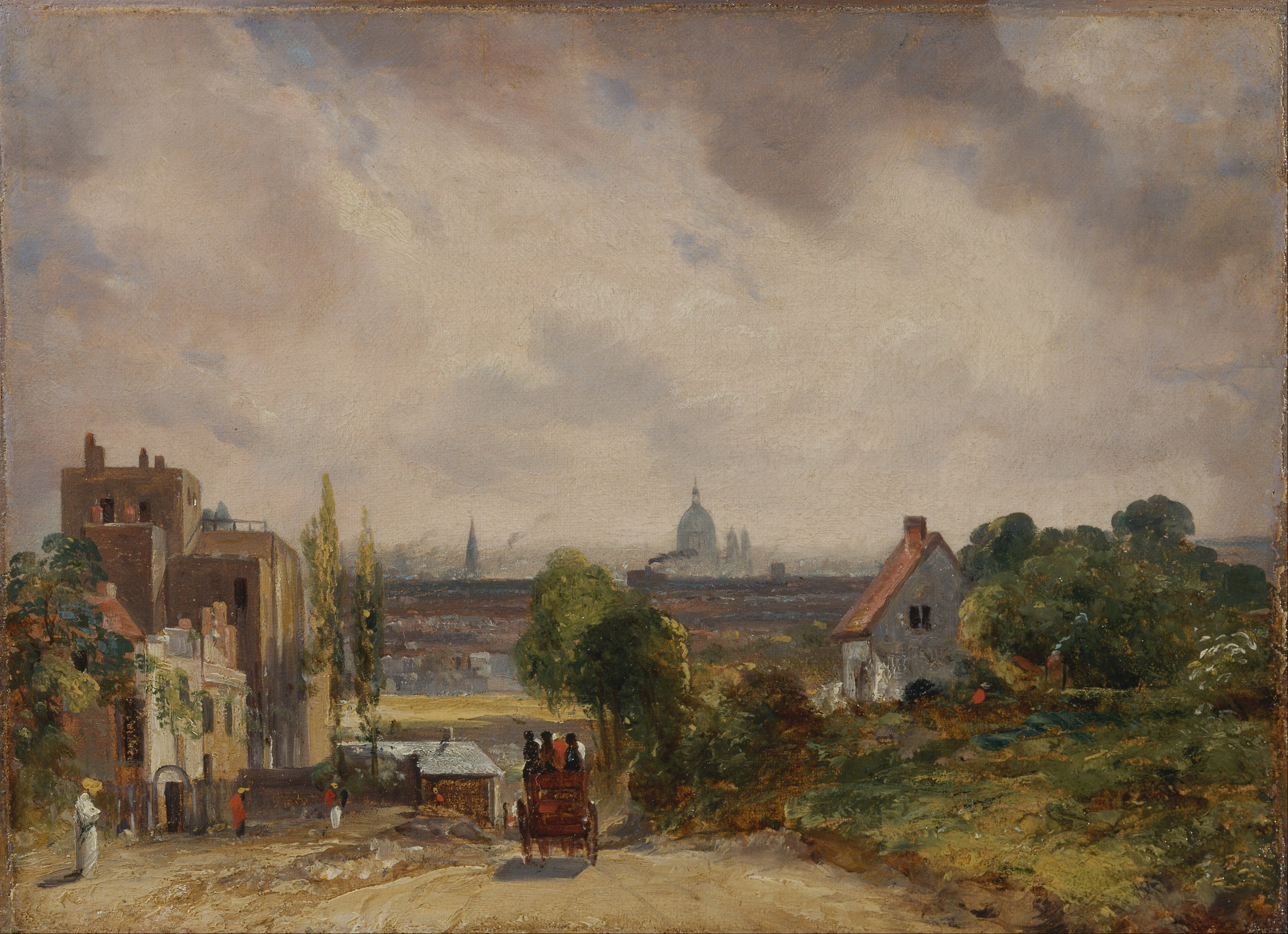
- Artist: John Constable
- Year: 1831–32
- Type: Oil on canvas, Landscape painting
- Dimensions: 32.4 cm × 40.6 cm (12.8 in × 16.0 in)
- Location: Yale Center for British Art, New Haven, Connecticut

Sir Richard Steele's Cottage, Hampstead is a landscape painting by the British artist John Constable, begun in 1831 and completed the following year. It shows a view from Haverstock Hill in then rural Hampstead looking southwards towards London with its skyline dominated by St Paul's Cathedral. The painting takes its name from the cottage to the right of the road, formerly home to the Irish writer and politician Richard Steele, a member of the Kit Cat Club. On the left of the street is a public house the Load of Hay, popular with travellers on their way to Hampstead Heath. The stretch was part of Hampstead Road which connected the city to Hampstead and still retains its historic alignment. The cottage was demolished in 1867 during the development of Belsize Park as a residential area, but is still commemorated by the name of Steele Road.

Constable lived in Hampstead from 1819 and painted many scenes of the surrounding area. It was exhibited at the Royal Academy's Summer Exhibition of 1832.

The painting was bequeathed by Paul Mellon to the Yale Center for British Art in Connecticut in 2001. A mezzotint based on the painting by David Lucas is now in the Tate Britain.

== See also ==
- List of paintings by John Constable

== Bibliography ==
- Vaughan, Laura (ed.) Suburban Urbanities: Suburbs and the Life of the High Street. UCL Press, 2015.
- Wade, Christopher. The Streets of Belsize. Camden History Society, 1991.
