= Madeline Green =

British painter and etcher

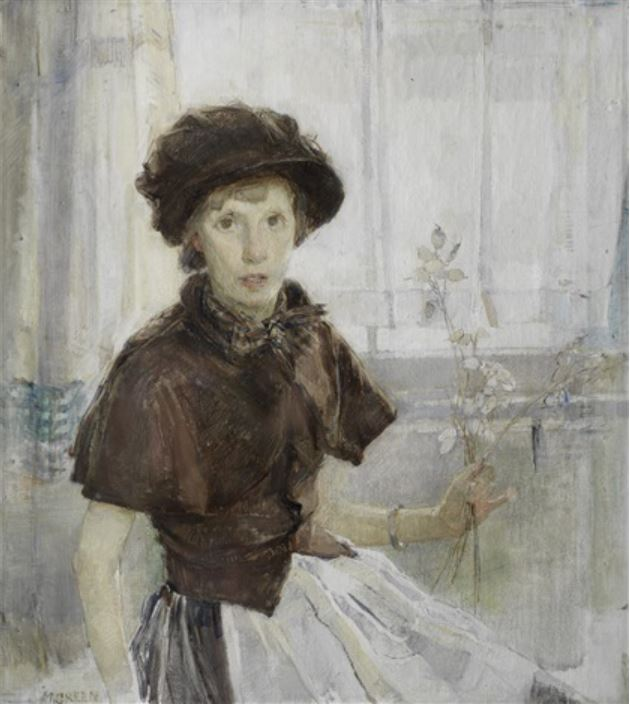
- Madeline Green, Self-Portrait painting Honesty (Private collection)
- Born: Madeline Emily Green; 27 August 1884; Craven Road, Paddington, London
- Died: 17 February 1947 (aged 62); Norwich, Norfolk, England
- Education: Royal Academy of Arts
- Known for: Figurative artist

Madeline Emily Green (1884–1947) was a British figurative artist, who exhibited at the Royal Academy, the Society of Women Artists, the Society of Graphic Art and at many other locations in Great Britain, and abroad.

== Biography ==
Green’s parents were Emily Laura (née Butler) and Frederick John Green, a butcher and farmer. They had a son, followed by four daughters the third of whom, Madeline, was born at 3 Craven Road, Paddington on 27 August 1884. She was baptised at St James, Paddington. The Green family moved from 3 Craven Road, Hyde Park to Silsoe Villa, Uxbridge Road, Ealing (later known as 40 The Mall), in about 1889.

From the age of nine Green attended Princess Helena College with her sisters. She studied at the Royal Academy of Arts in London from 31 July 1906 to July 1911. On 10 December, 1911 she was awarded two RA medals (1) £25 and a Silver medal, for a cartoon of a draped figure “Agrippina carrying the ashes of Germanicus” and (2) a second prize Bronze medal for a “painting of head from the life”. Green set up her Northcote studio at 51 The Mall, close to her home.

In the early 1940s Green moved to Sutton Bridge, Lincolnshire and then to Melton Constable Park in Norfolk, following the requisition of 40 The Mall by the Government. Two years later she was at The Grange, Felmersham and finally in 1943 she and her sister Gladys lived in Sloley, Norfolk, where their address was “The Shop”. Madeline died, aged 62, in the Norfolk and Norwich Hospital on 17 February 1947. Gladys, who “managed affairs and organised exhibitions, allowing Madeline to focus entirely on her work”, died on 18 May 1951 in Tring. The two sisters are buried, with their parents, at St Leonard's church, Heston.

== Works and exhibitions ==
Madeline Green’s work was exhibited during her lifetime in at least 18 galleries, in England, Scotland and Ireland, as well as at the Venice Biennale, the Paris Salons (where she was twice awarded medals), and in Adelaide and Melbourne.

In November 1910, while still at the Royal Academy, Madeline joined 26 others in Ealing in setting up the Ealing Art Guild, the brainchild of Arthur Sortwell and John Dovaston. John’s sister, Margaret Dovaston, is credited with founding the Guild, but the newspaper cited only makes reference to her showing works at the opening Exhibition. It is not known whether Green exhibited with the Guild in the early days; it later became the Ealing Arts Club and the catalogues show that Green exhibited “Ponies’ Heads” and "The Young Man" in 1931, and “Horses” in 1933, suggesting that she had been a long time member.

Newspaper reports of exhibitions indicate that one of Green’s earliest displays was at Aylesbury Town Hall in November 1912, soon after she had finished at the Royal Academy. The following year, a review in the Bedford local paper of works in the town’s annual exhibition noted that Green’s “spirited drawings of horses are quite admirable”.

Green exhibited 24 times at the Royal Academy’s Summer Exhibition during the years 1912–1943, with a total of 32 paintings. They were sometimes singled out for special comment. As early as 1915, for example, a critic remarked on “a small painting by Miss Madeline Green, ‘The Model’, which also makes its appeal by its delicate refinements and subtle quality. The colouring is of greys, with a blue note in the skirt of the figure, and is most successful, and the picture stands out among its more ordinary surroundings by its inherent distinction.”

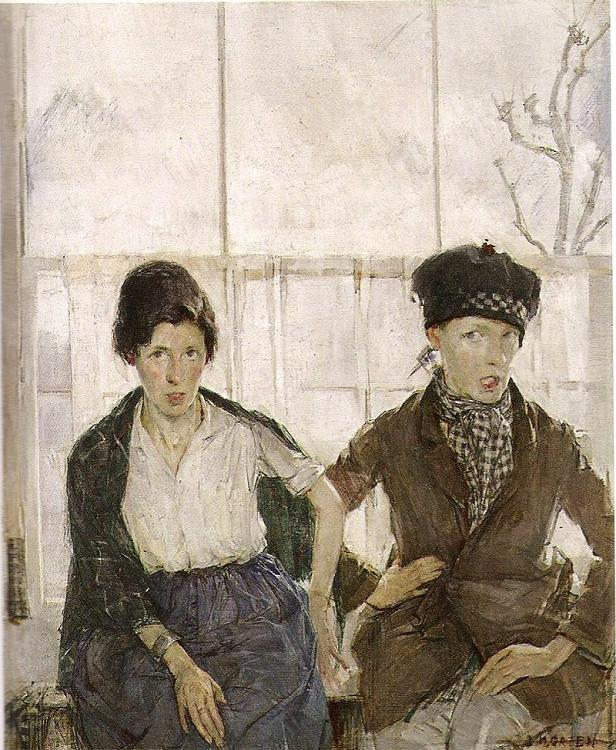
Madeline Green, Glasgow c. 1930, oil on canvas, 53.6 x 43.3 cm, National Gallery of Victoria, Melbourne, Felton Bequest, 1931 (4468-3)

Madeline Green exhibited “The Balloon Girl” at the Royal Hibernian Academy, Dublin in 1916, at a time which coincided with the Easter Rising. The Academy was hit by a shell from the armed steam yacht “Helga” which destroyed all the hundreds of paintings on display and many valuable reference works. The Property Losses (Ireland) Committee awarded Green their standard 85% of her £30 claim for her painting.

In 1918 "The Step Dancer" (a self-portrait) was lampooned in Punch magazine. The original rather feminine figure with “striped green silk taffeta iridescent harem trousers” was turned into a cartoon “where the gentle gaze has turned shrewish, her stockings bagged around bony ankles and ungainly flat feet.”

Green took part in the inaugural exhibition of the Society of Graphic Art at the Suffolk Street Galleries in London, on 1–29 January 1921, showing five of her works; in the three following years she exhibited ten more. In December 1924 in Adelaide, at Mr F W Preece’s bookshop and gallery on King William Street, three of Madeline Green’s works (“Remounts”, “On the Balcony” and “Covent Garden”) were displayed, along with those of other members of the Society of Graphic Art. Green retired from the Society in 1927.

In 1925 “The Future” left one observer slightly mystified: “It is a clever painting, delightful in its colour and technique. A young man and a young woman [are] seated apart in what appears to be a public gallery. The maiden is sadly pensive, the youth frankly bored. Possibly the lady’s wedding ring conveys a hint of the artist’s meaning.” The artist’s meaning became a little clearer in 1927 when Sir Joseph Duveen, Bt, a noted British art dealer, purchased “The Future” and presented it to Manchester City Art Gallery. The Curator, Lawrence Howard, wrote to Madeline Green asking for details of her painting, so that he could correctly catalogue it and, if need be, have it appropriately cleaned or restored in years to come. Green replied that the painting was intended to portray a newly married couple looking into the future, and that she had sat for the figure of the coster girl herself, using a looking glass to help compose the picture. Madeline also explained her technique: “[the painting] is done in body colour underneath & glazed with pure colour and oil – I always paint this way – & although it takes rather a time I don’t think the same effect can be obtained otherwise.”

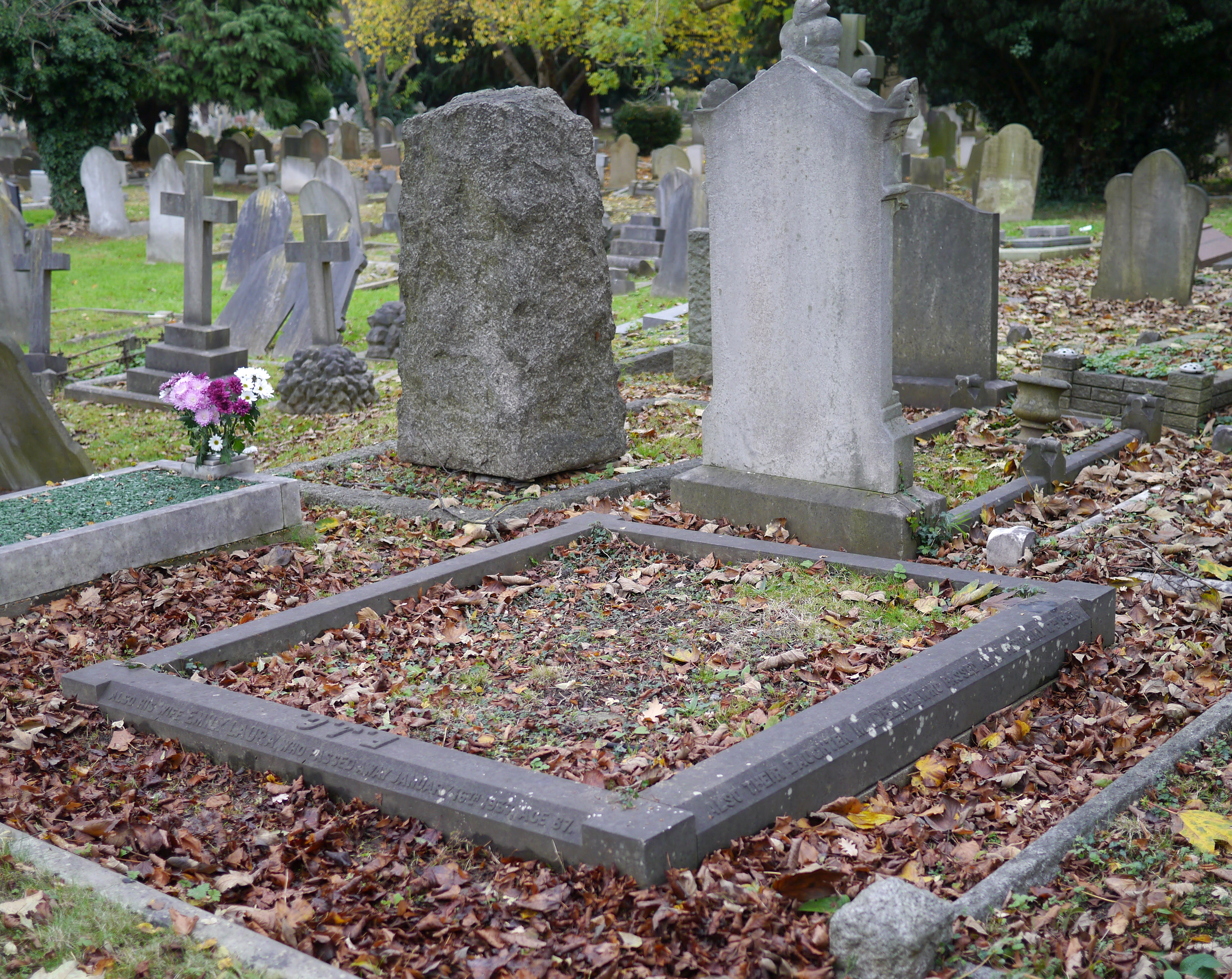
Square kerb memorial of Madeline Green, her parents, and sister Gladys (not named on grave) at St. Leonard, Heston.

Examples of Green’s paintings are held, although not always on display, by several UK galleries including those in Dulwich, Glasgow, Kirklees, Leeds and Manchester. Sacha Llewellyn notes that "Madeline Green's Self-portrait (The Chenille Net) occupies an important position In Dulwich Picture Gallery's collection. It is one of the few works by a female artist."

In 1931, with the help of the Felton Bequest the National Gallery of Victoria acquired “Glasgow”, which was displayed in their 2007 exhibition “Modern Britain, 1900–1960.” The catalogue describes how Madeline and Gladys were the models for this "engaging and enigmatic painting [which] depicts a somewhat unconventional pairing of women, whose costume and demeanour raise questions about the representation of gender and sexuality during the modernist period.”

An exhibition of Green’s pictures, “Moments in Time”, was held in 2011 at the PM Gallery in Ealing, not far from 40 The Mall. A new exhibition ("Reflections of an Artist: Madeline Green, 1884-1947") opened at Gunnersbury Park Museum on 11 February 2020.

A comprehensive list of Madeline Green’s works is published in Carole Walker's book. She was a versatile artist who used a variety of techniques including aquatint, charcoal, drypoint, oil, and watercolour.

After a period of little interest, her oil and watercolour paintings now change hands at auction with increasing frequency, at prices in the thousands and sometimes tens of thousands of pounds sterling.
