= Eli Marsden Wilson =

English artist

Eli Marsden Wilson A.R.E., A.R.C.E.
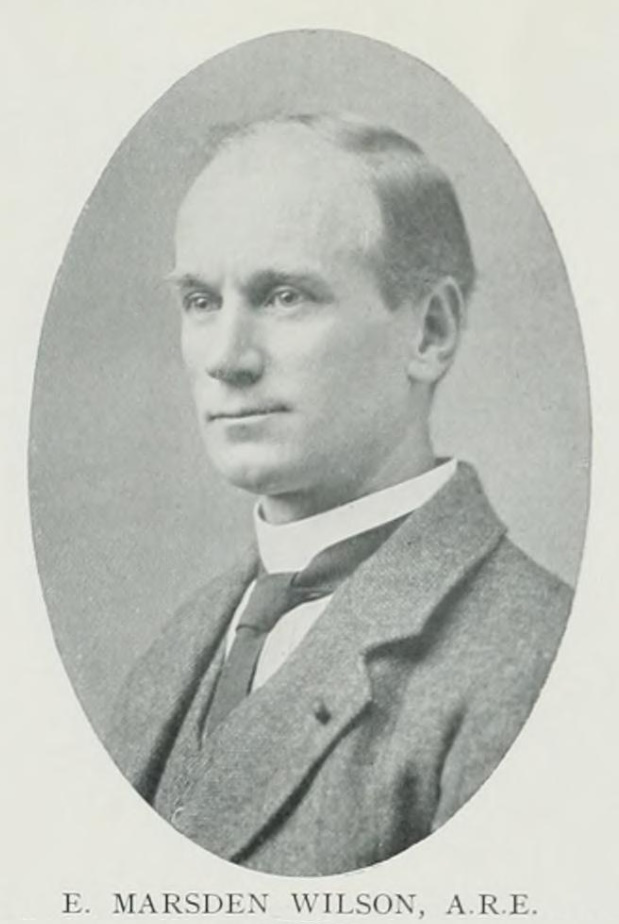
- Photographic portrait of Eli Marsden Wilson.
- Born: 24 June 1877; Ossett, Yorkshire, England
- Died: 13 November 1965 (aged 88); Acton, London, England
- Education: Wakefield College of Art
- Alma mater: Royal College of Art
- Occupations: Artist; etcher; painter
- Spouse: Hilda Mary Pemberton
- Parents: Alfred Wilson; Emma Marsden

Eli Marsden Wilson, A.R.E., A.R.C.E. (24 June 1877 – 13 November 1965) was an English artist whose best known works are in etching and mezzotint, covering a wide range of subjects. He had works exhibited at the Royal Academy.

== Biography ==
Eli Marsden Wilson was born on 24 June 1877 at Ossett, Yorkshire, the only son of Alfred Wilson, a foreman beamer in the textile industry, and Emma (née Marsden). Eli and his five sisters were encouraged in the arts and each played a musical instrument. Wilson received his initial formal artistic education at the Wakefield College of Art before moving to the Royal College of Art in London where he became a pupil of the master etcher Sir Frank Short.

In mid-year 1905 Eli Wilson and Hilda Mary Pemberton were married in London. Hilda was an artist with an interest in etching, the daughter of civil engineer Frederick Blake Pemberton and his wife Lucy. She was six years older than her husband and the couple had no children.

From 1905 Wilson began to produce etchings and mezzotints of towns and lowland landscapes which he exhibited at the Royal Academy, the first of which was an etching 'The Market, Ossett', depicting a scene from Victorian times. He was elected an Associate of the Royal Society of Painter-Etchers and Engravers (A.R.E.) in 1907. Wilson exhibited at the Royal Society of Painter-Etchers, as well as the Paris Salon and exhibitions and galleries in other European countries and America. In London he lived in Chelsea and later relocated to Acton.

Wilson's religious family background was Wesleyan Methodist. He became a Quaker embracing pacifist beliefs and was also a vegetarian. In 1916, with the stalemate and massive casualties on the Western Front during World War I, conscription was introduced in Britain specifying that men aged 18 to 40 years were liable to be called up for military service. In late 1916 Wilson, then aged 38, was conscripted into the army. He appealed to the local tribunal for exemption on the grounds that he was a Quaker and a pacifist, but was refused. The army had created the Non-Combatant Corps in order to find an acceptable place for conscientious objectors, but Wilson's commitment to pacifism was absolute and he refused to comply with the call-up notice. He was arrested and taken to the local barracks. When he refused to put on a uniform Wilson was court martialled and imprisoned from February 1917 to March 1919, first at Wormwood Scrubs and then at Dartmoor.

After being released from prison Wilson began to rebuild his career. In September 1922 he was commissioned by Princess Marie Louise to produce miniature etchings for Queen Mary's Dolls' House, at Windsor Castle.^{[A]}

In the late-1920s Wilson was commissioned to paint a four-panel frieze depicting prehistoric England, which was installed in the Geological section of the Natural History Museum in South Kensington. The museum also holds several of his oil paintings, 'Scene in Wealden Times' (during the Cretaceous period) and a pair of paintings depicting the Nant Ffrancon Valley in North Wales during the Pleistocene geological epoch. During the Great Depression the market for etchings declined and Wilson turned to easel painting. In 1931 Wilson submitted four separate stamp designs to the New Zealand government, though none were accepted.

Wilson served as Chairman of the Ealing Art Group from 1935 to 1947.

Wilson and his wife moved to a cottage in Blewbury, Berkshire (now in Oxfordshire). Hilda died in 1957 and Wilson's pupil, Mary Cockburn, subsequently became his live-in companion.

Eli Marsden Wilson died at his home, 9 Faraday Road, Acton, London, in November 1965, and was cremated at Mortlake, London, on 19 November. Administration of his estate was granted to Edward Clay, a descendant of Wilson's sister Annie.

== Notes ==
A. In November 2012 three of Wilson's etchings were shown on the BBC programme 'Antiques Roadshow', by descendants of one of the artist's sisters. Two of the etchings shown on the program were images of the interior of Wilson's cell during his imprisonment as an absolutist conscientious objector during and after World War I. The third image was a print of the miniature etching used to decorate Queen Mary's dolls' house in 1922.
