= Japp–Klingemann reaction =

Chemical reaction

Named after	Francis Robert Japp; Felix Klingemann
Reaction type	Coupling reaction

Identifiers
RSC ontology ID	RXNO:0000158

The Japp–Klingemann reaction is a chemical reaction used to synthesize hydrazones from β-keto-acids (or β-keto-esters) and aryl diazonium salts. The reaction is named after the chemists Francis Robert Japp and Felix Klingemann.

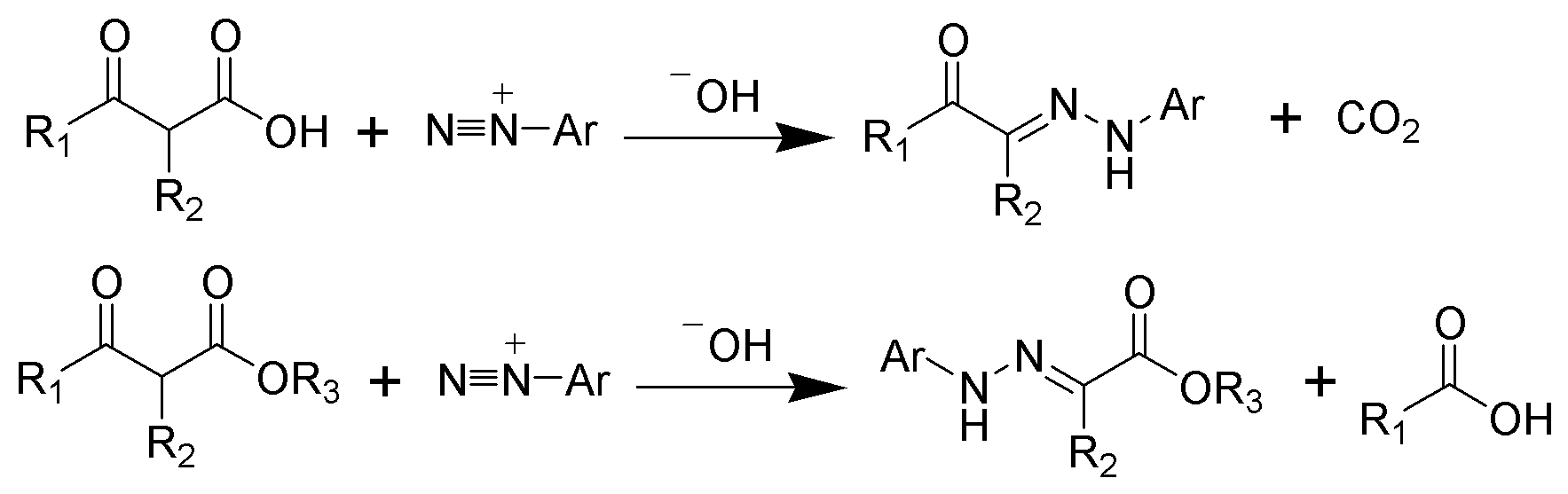

The hydrazone products of the Japp–Klingemann reaction are most often used as intermediates in syntheses of more complex organic molecules. For example, a phenylhydrazone product can be heated in the presence of strong acid to produce an indole via the Fischer indole synthesis.

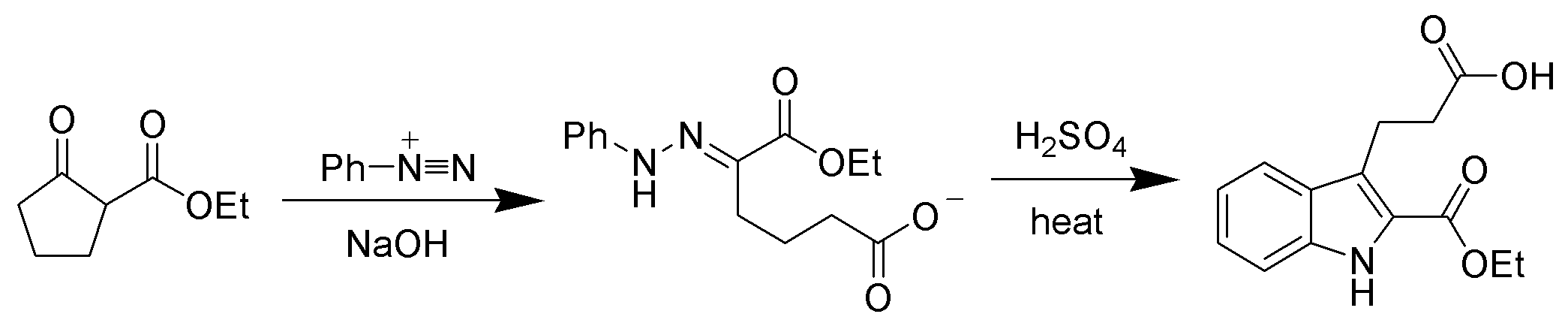

If there is a leaving group elsewhere in the Japp–Klingemann product, the hydrazone instead can cyclize at that site via a substitution reaction to give a pyrazole. This process is a key part of the synthesis of pyraclofos and related compounds:

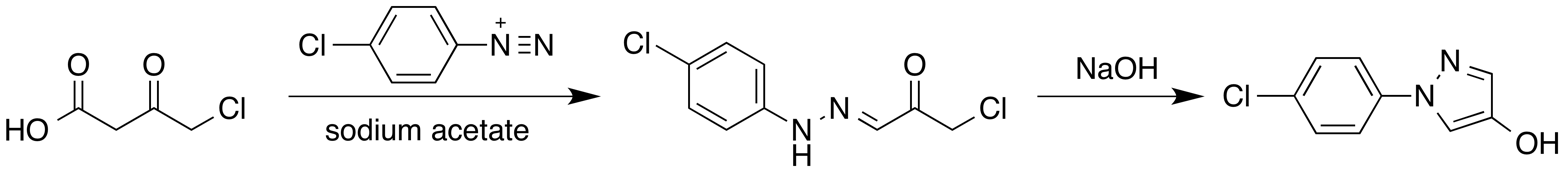

== Reaction mechanism ==
To illustrate the mechanism, the Japp-Klingemann ester variation will be considered. The first step is the deprotonation of the β-keto-ester. The nucleophilic addition of the enolate anion 2 to the diazonium salt produces the azo compound 3. Intermediate 3 has been isolated in rare cases. However, in most cases, the hydrolysis of intermediate 3 produces a tetrahedral intermediate 4, which quickly decomposes to release the carboxylic acid 6. After hydrogen exchange, the final hydrazone 7 is produced.

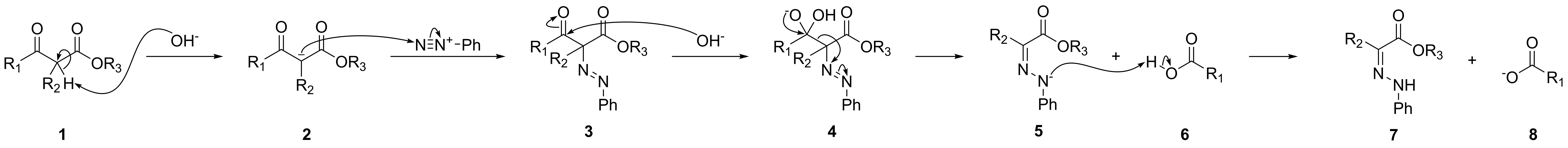
The Japp-Klingemann reaction mechanism

== Applications ==
Indole synthesis: Hydrazones formed in this reaction undergo Fischer Indole synthesis.

Pyrazole synthesis: On cyclization, Hydrazones yield Pyrazoles.

Preparation of Azo Derivatives.

Widely used in Medicinal Chemistry for Heterocyclic frameworks.
