= James Alphege Brewer =

British illustrator (1881–1946)

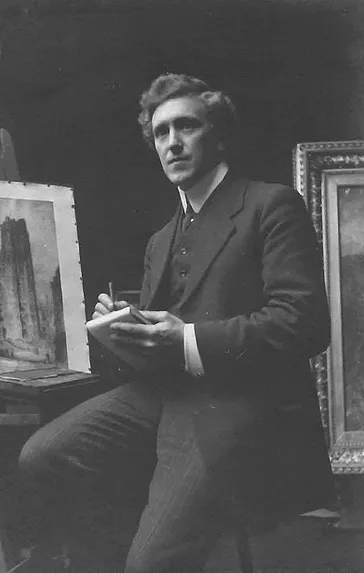
J. Alphege Brewer with his "The Cathedral of St. Gudule.... Brussels, Belgium" (1914) on the easel

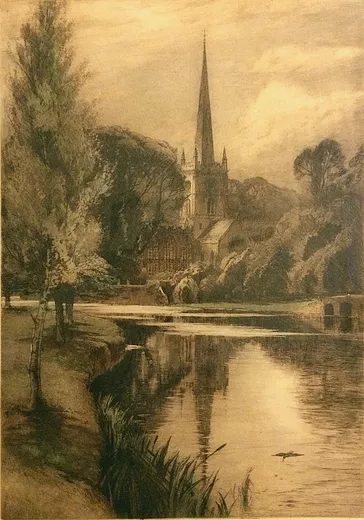
"Where Shakespeare Sleeps (Stratford-on-Avon)," a 1921 etching by James Alphege Brewer and his brother Henry Charles Brewer.

James Alphege Brewer (1881–1946) was a well-known early 20th century producer of colour etchings - notably of English and European Cathedrals and churches and other scenes.

== Family and early life ==
Brewer was born on 24 July 1881, in Kensington, London, the son of Henry William Brewer, noted artist of historical architecture. His brothers included the painter Henry Charles Brewer and the novelist and organist John Francis Brewer. Their grandfather was the historian John Sherren Brewer and their great uncle was E. Cobham Brewer, compiler of Brewer's Dictionary of Phrase & Fable.

Brewer's father and grandfather John Sherren Brewer were notable adherents of the Oxford Movement, inspired by Augustus Pugin. Henry William Brewer and his family, including James Alphege Brewer, became high-profile converts to the Roman Catholic Church.

On 23 July 1910, Brewer marries Florence née Lucas at Our Lady of Lourdes Catholic Church in Acton. Florence was an accomplished painter, and great niece of David Lucas (engraver) who created engravings for John Constable. Brewer and his wife Florence Lucas lived on Avenue Road in Acton throughout their marriage. Henry Charles Brewer also lived in Acton, and the brothers collaborated on many pictures.

== Professional life ==
Like his brother Henry Charles Brewer, Brewer attended St Charles Catholic College in Kensington, before studying at the Westminster School of Art with Frederick Brown.

Brewer exhibited at the Royal Academy of Art and thereafter at the Royal Institute of Painters in Watercolour, at the Paris Salon of the Académie des Beaux-Arts, and in the shows of the Royal Cambrian Academy. He was also a member of the Society of Graphic Art, and the Ealing Art Group, where he was first Honorary Art Secretary and then Honorary Art Chairman.

Brewer is believed to be the model for his brother Henry Charles's wall paintings created for the Lady Chapel of St Peter's Church, Ealing in 1928. An etching by Brewer, donated in 2023, can also be found in the chapel.

Brewer died on February 4, 1946, at the age of 64 and is buried in Acton Cemetery near to his brother, Henry Charles.
