= Geddington Chase SSSI =

Protected area in Northamptonshire, England

Coordinates: 52.453°N 0.67°W

Geddington Chase
- Site of Special Scientific Interest
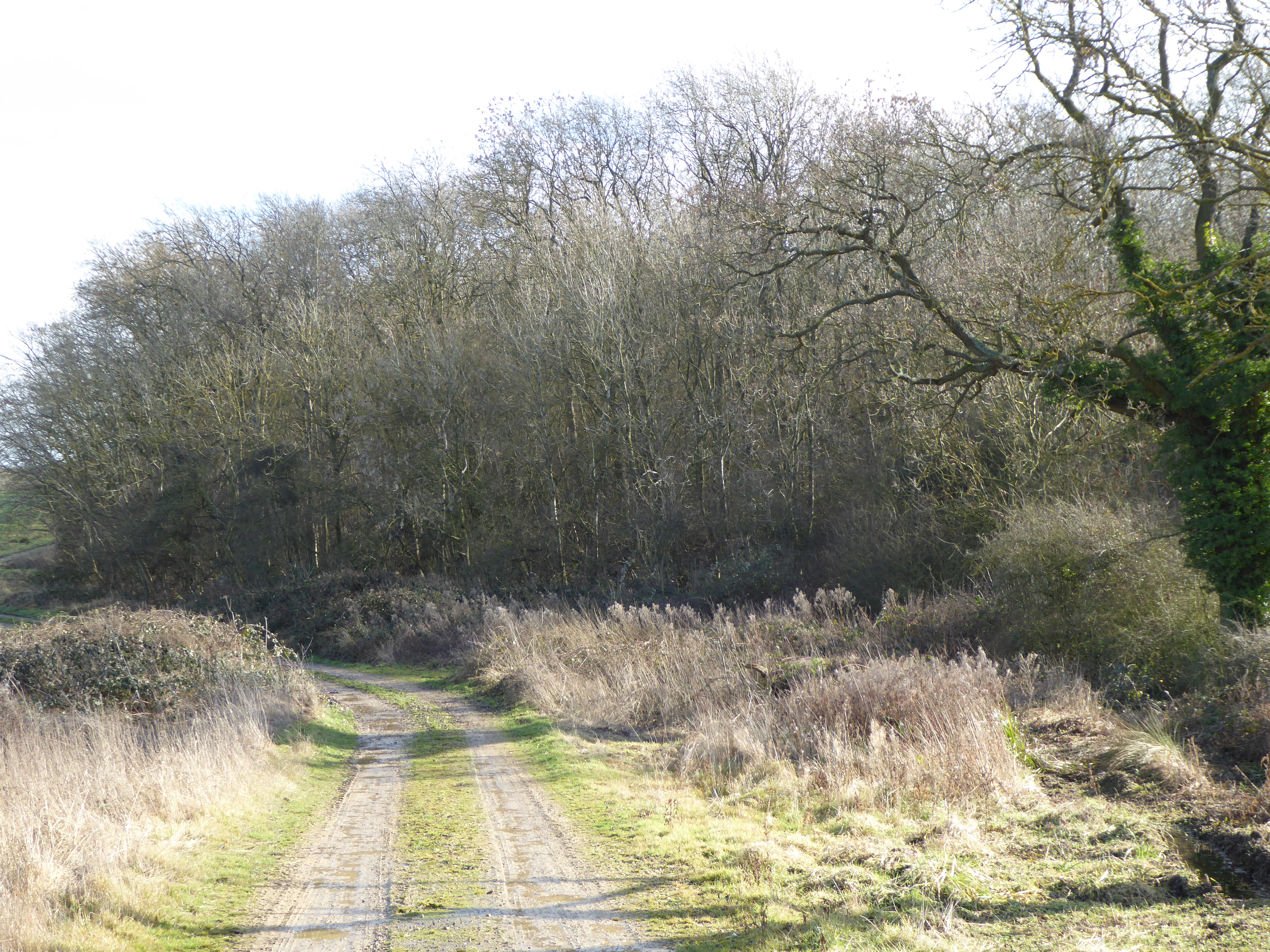
- Location of Geddington Chase.
- Area of search: Northamptonshire
- Grid reference: SP 904 847
- Interest: Biological
- Area: 39.1 hectares
- Notification date: 1984
- Location map: Magic Map

An area of 39.1 hectares in the north-west corner of Geddington Chase has been designated a biological Site of Special Scientific Interest (SSSI). It is located south-east of Corby in Northamptonshire.

Geddington Chase is a surviving fragment of the medieval Royal Forest of Rockingham. Most of the Chase is commercially managed, and the SSSI is an area of semi-natural wet ash/maple woodland on Midland boulder clay. The ground flora is diverse, with plants including bluebell, dog's mercury, tufted hair-grass, and a few wild daffodils.

The site is private land with no public access.
