= Henry Charles Brewer =

British painter

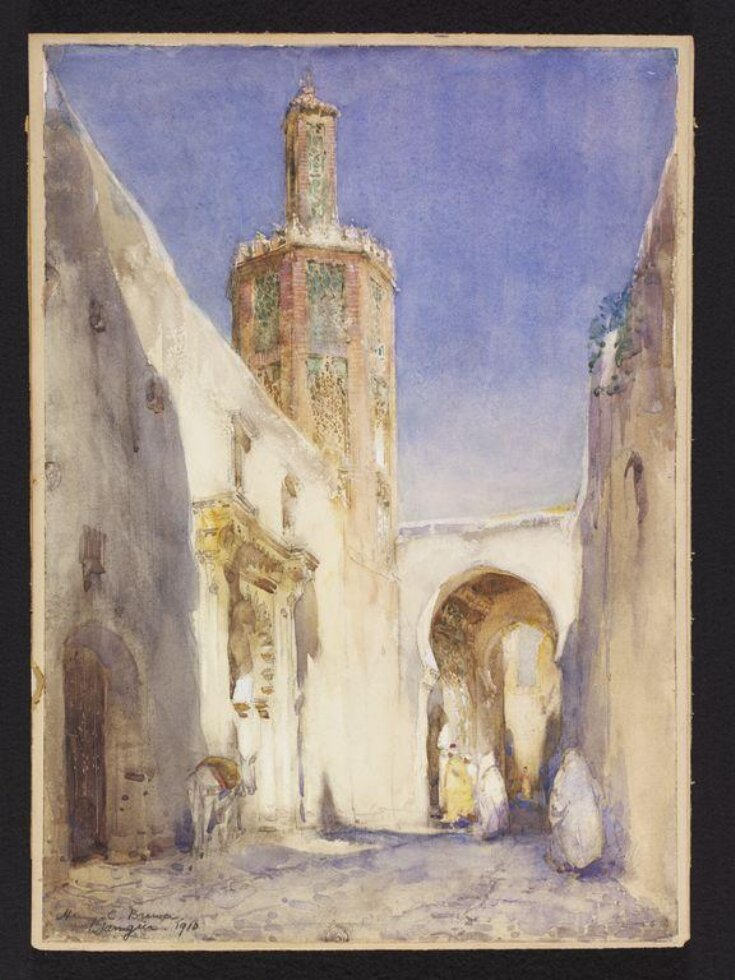
A Street in Tangier (1910) by Henry Charles Brewer, from the collection of the Victoria & Albert Museum

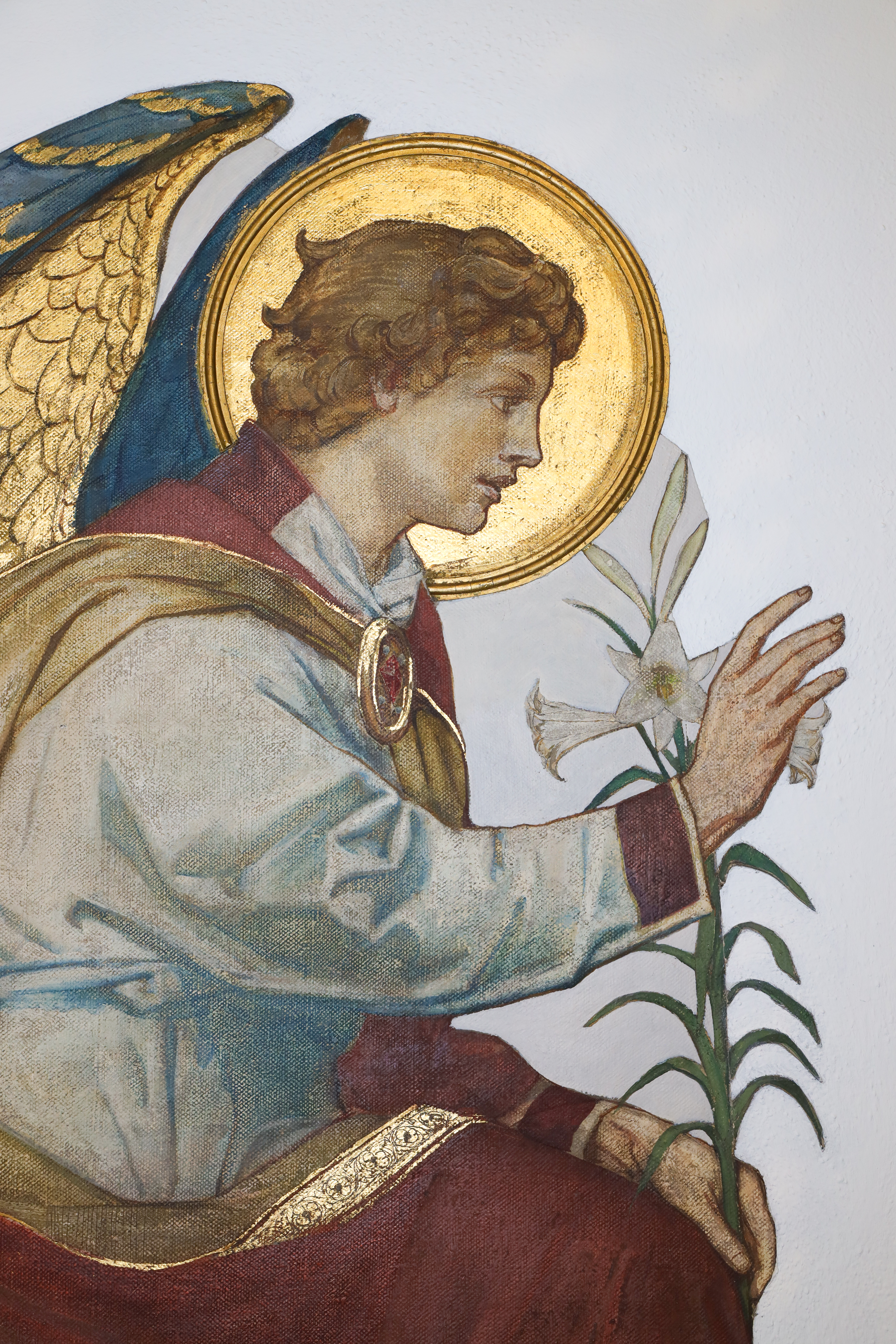
Lady Chapel Wall Painting of the Angel Gabriel St Peter's Church, Ealing by Henry Charles Brewer

Henry Charles Brewer (1866–1950) was a British painter well known in the first half of the 20th century for his watercolour landscapes and architectural paintings.

== Family and early life ==
Born on 25 May 1866 in Wurzburg, Bavaria, Henry Charles Brewer was part of a family of leading professional artists. His father was the architectural illustrator Henry William Brewer, and his brother was the creator of etchings, James Alphege Brewer. Their elder brother was the novelist and organist John Francis Brewer. Brewer' paternal grandfather was the historian John Sherren Brewer and their great uncle was E. Cobham Brewer, compiler of Brewer's Dictionary of Phrase & Fable. He was educated at St Charles College, Kensington.

He was married to Mary Malle (from Dover, Kent).

Brewer's father and grandfather, John Sherren Brewer, were notable adherents of the Oxford Movement, inspired by Augustus Pugin. Henry William Brewer and his family, including Henry Charles Brewer, became high-profile converts to the Roman Catholic Church.

Brewer lived on Perryn Road in Acton. His brother, James Alphege, also lived in Acton, and the artists collaborated on numerous paintings and were active in local artistic circles, including being members of the Ealing Art Group.

== Professional life ==
Brewer studied at Westminster School of Art with Frederick Brown and thereafter travelled extensively abroad in search of subjects. He is known to have visited, amongst other places, Tangier, Spain, Greece, Belgium, France and Italy, including Venice. His watercolours are loose an atmospheric, and he particularly enjoyed skies at dawn and sunset.His subjects include Cathedrals and other ecclesiastical and historical buildings, as well as pastoral and urban scenes. Many of his pictures depict scenes from London where he lived.

Brewer exhibited at the Fine Art Society and the Royal Academy between 1899 and 1902, and in 1913 the Royal Society of Arts awarded him its gold medal. Brewer also participated in a number of exhibitions in Australia and New Zealand.

A member of the Royal Institute of Painters in Water Colours, Brewer was elected to the Royal Institution of Great Britain in 1914. He was also a member of the Society of Graphic Art. In 1932 he held an exhibition of 'Watercolours of Venice & Northern Italy, held at the Fine Art Society.

No pictures by Brewer appear in the Royal Collection Trust (unlike those of his father Henry William Brewer, who was commissioned by Queen Victoria and is represented by 26 pictures in the Collection). Nevertheless, Brewer holds a significant place in Royal art. He undertook a number of paintings of the George VI's Coronation Ceremony in 1937, five of which were reproduced as large coloured plates in 'The Illustrated London News Coronation Record Number George VI & Queen Elizabeth' of the same year.

Despite his Roman Catholic faith, very few of Brewer's pictures could be described as devotional. Even the illustrations undertaken by both Brewer and his father, Henry William Brewer, for Stuart Rose's 1891 book, 'St. Ignatius Loyola and the Early Jesuits', focused on buildings and landscape. Brewer's subjects were chosen rather with an eye to commercial success. In 1928 however, he was commissioned to create wall paintings in the Lady Chapel of St Peter's Church, Ealing. The painted figures representing the Annunciation are his only known church decoration work. It is believed that the artist's brother James Alphege Brewer is the model for the face of the Angel Gabriel.

Brewer died at his home in Ealing on 21 October 1950 and is buried in Acton Cemetery (north side) near to his brother, James Alphege Brewer.

== Public collections ==
The Victoria & Albert Museum holds two Henry Charles Brewer paintings.
