= Henry William Brewer =

British artist

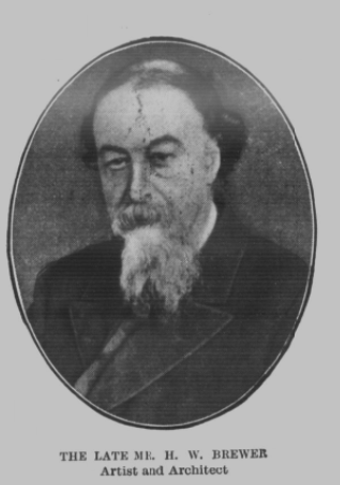
Henry William Brewer (The Graphic 17 October 1903)

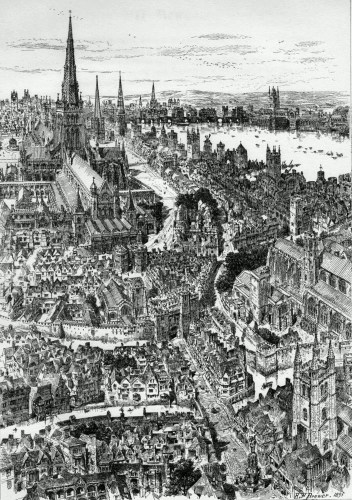
Henry William Brewer, Ludgate from the West (1895)

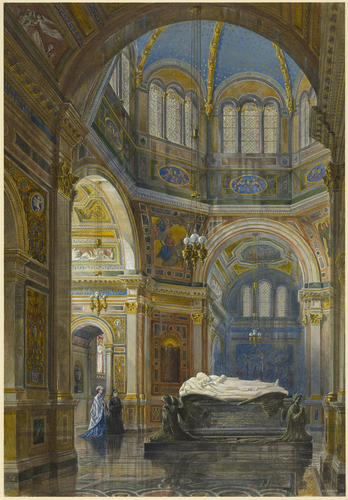
Frogmore: Interior of the Royal Mausoleum, Frogmore by Henry William Brewer, commissioned by Queen Victoria in 1869 and held by the Royal Collection Trust

Henry William Brewer (7 August 1836 – 6 October 1903) was a British illustrator, notable for his detailed city panoramas, held to be one of the most outstanding architectural draughtsmen of his day.

== Family and early life ==
Brewer was born in Oxford on 7 August 1836. His father was the historian John Sherren Brewer, and his uncle, E. Cobham Brewer, the compiler of Brewer's Dictionary of Phrase & Fable.

Brewer received his early education at the Baptist school in Norwich founded by his grandfather, John Sherren Brewer Senior. His school fellows included the clinician and physiologist Sydney Ringer, the orientalist Professor Robert Lubbock Bensly, the architect Edward Boardman and Brewer's cousin, John Odin Howard Taylor. The school's drawing master and art teacher was the architectural painter David Hodgson (artist), from whom the young Henry Brewer received private lessons in oil painting and drawing, developing his love of mediaeval and other architecture.

Brewer later continued his art studies under William Warren and the prominent painter George Clarkson Stanfield. He was also a pupil at King's College, London, where his father was Professor of Literature.

Brewer married Frances Mary Mottley (1842–1927) in Germany on 7 July 1862. His older children were born in Bavaria. His sons Henry Charles Brewer and James Alphege Brewer achieved notoriety as artists and engravers. His eldest son, John Francis Brewer, became an organist and writer.

Brewer, an adherent of the Oxford Movement like his father, was influenced by Augustus Pugin and others to enter the Catholic Church. This high-profile conversion was also undertaken by Brewer's children.

== Professional life ==
Brewer trained as an architectural draughtsman. His early professional was chiefly drawings of medieval buildings in Germany, where he was living, noteworthy for their individual and masterly sense of composition, detail and the breadth of light and shade. He developed a deep knowledge of architecture, and later drew many pictures which imagined or recreated architectural features and historical events – underpinned by learning and research. But it was for his panoramic bird's eye views of British towns and cities that he became chiefly known.

He was a frequent exhibitor the Royal Academy, the British Institution and the Suffolk Street Gallery from 1858 to 1893.

Brewer was a favourite Royal Painter, and undertook a number of commissions for the Royal Family. Most significant among these was a commission from Queen Victoria in 1869, for whom he executed number of water colour paintings of her Royal Mausoleum, Frogmore, her resting place for Albert, Prince Consort and herself. The Queen herself appears in some of these intensely personal pictures and took great interest in watching Brewer at his work.

He also produced a series of views of London, showing the city in the time of Henry VIII, later published as "Old London illustrated".

Brewer also taught illustration. The Pall Mall Gazette article records in 1871 that "the programme for the new term at the Working Men's College, 45, Great Ormond-street, has just been issued. In art there are six classes, the life class being visited by Mr. Lowes Cato Dickinson and Mr. Cave Thomas, with a special course in perspective by Mr. Henry W. Brewer."

== Writings ==
Brewer became an expert on medieval architecture, and wrote authoritatively and extensively on the subject of buildings for a number of periodicals. His articles generally appeared under the initials 'HWB', and were often richly illustrated by his architectural drawings. His work appeared in both The Graphic and The Builder for around 25 years prior to his death.

He also wrote for The Girl's Own Paper between 1889 and 1901, where subjects included Interesting Monuments of Distinguished Women (1889), The Castle of Cleve and the 'Magic Swan' (1890), The Largest Churches in Europe (1891), Archeology for Girls (1895), Typical Church Towers of English Counties (1895), Old English Cottage Homes (1899), and Site Base Support and Superstructure – Ancient and Modern Methods of Building (1901). Brewer's son, the author John Francis Brewer, also wrote for The Girl's Own Paper.

== Later life and death ==
Brewer died in 1903. An obituary in The Builder, reproduced in The Norfolk News, opined that:

"Mr. Brewer was one of the most simple-minded and unassuming of men: more interested his art for Its own sake than for any advantage he could make for himself out of it. From years of outdoor sketching in all weathers, had the weather-beaten appearance suggesting the life of sailor rather than of an artist; and though he always appeared to have excellent health, perhaps this exposure shortened his life; he was only 67 when died [...] He was one who, both for his character and his talents, commanded the respect of all who knew him. and whose loss to us is one of the greatest which this journal could have sustained."

== Galleries ==
- 150 Henry William Brewer pictures are held by the Victoria & Albert Museum.
- 26 Henry William Brewer paintings are held by the Royal Collection Trust.
