= E. Cobham Brewer =

English reference-book author (1810–1897)

The Reverend Ebenezer Cobham Brewer
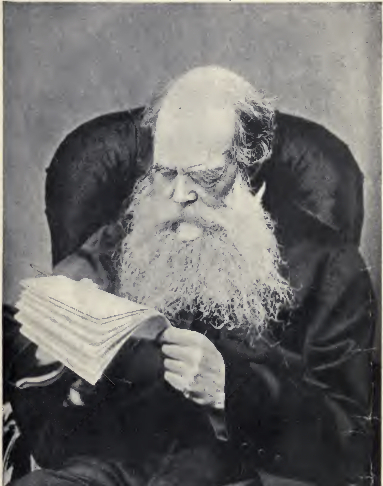
- E. Cobham Brewer from a 1922 book
- Born: Ebenezer Cobham Brewer; 2 May 1810; Norwich
- Died: 6 March 1897 (aged 86); Edwinstowe, Nottinghamshire
- Education: Trinity Hall, Cambridge
- Writing career
- Genre: Victorian reference works
- Notable works: Brewer's Dictionary of Phrase and Fable, The Reader's Handbook

Ebenezer Cobham Brewer (2 May 1810 in Norwich – 6 March 1897 in Edwinstowe, Nottinghamshire), was a British lexicographer and the author of A Guide to the Scientific Knowledge of Things Familiar, Brewer's Dictionary of Phrase and Fable, and The Reader's Handbook, among other reference books.

== Education and travels ==
E. Cobham Brewer was the son of Elisabeth, née Kitton, and John Sherren Brewer, a Norwich schoolmaster associated with the Baptist congregation in Norwich. His father kept a school there in Calvert Street until 1824, when he opened an academy in Eaton on the outskirts. E. Cobham Brewer attended Trinity Hall, Cambridge, graduating in Law in 1836. In the meantime he was ordained in 1838.

== The science of the familiar ==
On returning to Norwich to work at his father's school, Brewer compiled his first major work, A Guide to the Scientific Knowledge of Things Familiar, which appeared about 1838–1841 and became immensely popular. It followed a simple format like a catechism, with questions and answers, and focused on explaining "the common phenomena of life", such as why snow is white or leaves are green. In later parts Brewer's questions place scientific information in a theological context, by asking readers to consider how scientific examples illustrate "the goodness and wisdom of God". Its sales may have funded the extensive travels in Europe he made later.

== Phrase and fable ==
On returning to England in 1856, Brewer started on the work that would become Brewer's Dictionary of Phrase and Fable. This arose in part from correspondence with readers of his previous book. The first edition appeared in 1870 and a "New Edition revised, corrected, and enlarged" in 1895.

Of his methodology, Brewer wrote in the preface to the Historic Note-Book:

I have been an author for sixty years, have written many books, and of course have been a very miscellaneous reader. In my long experience I have remarked how little the range of "literary" reading has varied, and how doubt still centres on matters which were cruces in my early years. So that a work of this kind is of as much usefulness in 1891 as it would have been in 1830. I have always read with a slip of paper and a pencil at my side, to jot down whatever I think may be useful to me, and these jottings I keep sorted in different lockers. This has been a life-habit with me [...]

The Reader's Handbook has had an extended subsequent history. Detailed revisions by its editor, Henrietta Gerwig, it formed the nucleus of Crowell's Handbook for Readers and Writers, which in turn provided the nucleus of Benet's Reader's Encyclopedia, "veritably a new book", as Benét remarked; in revised form, it is still in print.

Brewer's Reader's Handbook was re-edited by Marion Harland (1830–1922) and published in the United States with numerous illustrations, as Character Sketches of Romance, Fiction and the Drama: A Revised American Edition of the Reader's Handbook, 4 vols., New York 1892. Other works by Brewer include A Dictionary of Miracles: Imitative, Realistic and Dogmatic (c. 1884), and The Historic Notebook, With an Appendix of Battles.

== Family ==
Several of Brewer's siblings gained academic and professional success. John Sherren Brewer, Jr. was a noted historian and editor of British State Papers at the Public Record Office, whose son was the architectural illustrator Henry William Brewer and his grandsons Henry Charles Brewer and James Alphege Brewer.

E. Cobham Brewer's other siblings included William Brewer, a surgeon, who was elected a Liberal MP for Colchester in 1868; Robert Kitton Brewer became a Doctor of Music and a Baptist minister; two of his sisters ran a girls' school in Lime Tree Road, Norwich.

In 1856, Brewer married Ellen Mary, eldest daughter of the Rev. Francis Tebbutt of Hove, in Paris.

E. Cobham Brewer died on 6 March 1897 at Edwinstowe Vicarage, Sherwood Forest, Nottinghamshire, where he had been living with his son-in-law, the Rev. H. T. Hayman.

== Works ==
- Dictionary of Phrase and Fable (1894)
- The Reader's Handbook Volume 1 (1899 edition)
- Character Sketches of Romance, Fiction and the Drama (eight or more volumes)
- Theology in Science, or the testimony of Science to the Wisdom and Goodness of God
- History of France, brought down to 1874
- Evidences of Christianity
- Guide to Science
