= John Sherren Brewer =

English clergyman, historian and scholar

John Sherren Brewer, Jr. (March 1809 – February 1879) was an English clergyman, historian and scholar. He was a brother of E. Cobham Brewer, compiler of Brewer's Dictionary of Phrase & Fable.

== Birth and education ==
Brewer was born in Norwich, the son of a Baptist schoolmaster. He matriculated at Queen's College, Oxford in 1827, graduating B.A. in 1833, M.A. 1835. He was ordained in the Church of England in 1837, and became chaplain to a central London workhouse. In 1839 he was appointed lecturer in classical literature at King's College London, and in 1858 he became professor of English language and literature and lecturer in modern history, succeeding FD Maurice. In 1854, Maurice invited him to teach at the newly opened Working Men's College; from 1869 to 1872 he was the College's Vice Principal.

Brewer's son Henry William Brewer (1836-1903) was a noted architectural artist. Henry William Brewer's sons were the artist Henry Charles Brewer and the creator of etchings James Alphege Brewer.

== Journalism and history ==
From 1854 onwards, Brewer combined these duties with journalistic work on the Morning Herald, Morning Post and Standard. In 1856 he was commissioned by the Master of the Rolls to prepare a calendar of the state papers of King Henry VIII, work demanding a vast amount of research. He was also made Reader, and subsequently Preacher, at the Rolls Chapel. He edited Fr. Rogeri Bacon Opera Quædam Hactenus Inedita (the edited Works of Roger Bacon) in 1859. In 1877 Benjamin Disraeli obtained for him the crown living of Toppesfield, Essex. There Brewer had time to continue his task of preparing his Letters and Papers of the Reign of Henry VIII, the "Introductions" to which (published separately, under the title The Reign of Henry VIII, in 1884) form a scholarly and authoritative history of Henry VIII's reign. New editions of several standard historical works were also produced under Brewer's direction.

=== Primary sources ===
- Letters and papers, foreign and domestic, of the reign of Henry VIII: preserved in the Public Record Office, the British Museum and elsewhere, Volume 1 edited by John S. Brewer, Robert H. Brodie, James Gairdner. (1862), full text online vol 1; full text vol 3
