= List of people from the London Borough of Ealing =

Among those who were born in the London Borough of Ealing, or have dwelt within the borders of the modern borough are (in alphabetical order):

== A ==
- Caroline Aherne, actor, was born in Ealing.
- Asma al-Assad, First Lady of Syria, grew up in Ealing.

== B ==
- Michael Balcon (1896–1977), film producer at Ealing Studios. He is commemorated with a blue plaque.
- Will Barker (1868–1951), a pioneer of British cinema, lived and worked at Ealing Green for many years.
- Osmond Barnes (1834–1930), Chief Herald of India, lived at 40 Mount Park Road, Ealing in retirement.
- Trevor Baylis (1937–2018), inventor, was born in Kilburn but grew up in Southall.
- Sanjeev Bhaskar (1963–), comedian, was born in Ealing.
- Bob Block (1921–2011), radio and television scriptwriter, lived in Madelely Road then Queen Anne's Grove, South Ealing from the late 1940s to 1996.
- Alan Blumlein (1903–1942), electronics engineer, lived in Ealing from 1933 until his death. He is commemorated with a blue plaque, placed on his house in the Haymills Estate.
- Lillian Board (1948–1970), track athlete and Olympic silver medallist, lived in Ealing from 1956 until her death. Lillian Board Way, in Greenford, is named in her honour.
- Gary Bond (1940–1995), actor, died in Ealing.
- Henry Charles Brewer (1866 - 1950) well known early 20th century artist, lived on Perryn Road, Acton until his death, and is buried in Acton Cemetery.
- James Alphege Brewer (1881-1946), notable creator of etchings, lived on Avenue Road, and is buried in Acton Cemetery.
- Lady Byron (Lord Byron's widow) of Fordhook House, Ealing, founded Ealing Grove School in 1834 – the first industrial school of its type. In 1860 C. N. Atlee, a former headmaster of the Lady Byron school set up the Byron House School in St. Mary's Road (South Ealing Road). The site has evolved through many changes into the present-day University of West London. At the main entrance is a blue plaque dedicated to Lady Byron and her pioneering, enlightened approach to education.
- Dorita Fairlie Bruce (1885–1970), children's author, lived in Ealing from c. 1895 to 1949.

== C ==
- Earl Cameron (1917–2020), Bermudan actor, lived in the Hanger Hill Garden Estate in west Acton in the mid-1960s.
- Reeta Chakrabarti, journalist and news correspondent, was born in Ealing.
- Dorothea Chambers (1878–1960), tennis player and seven-times Wimbledon ladies singles' champion between 1903 and 1914, lived at 7 North Common Road in Ealing. A commemorative blue plaque was placed on her home in 2005 by English Heritage.
- Pat Chapman (1940–), food writer and founder of the Curry Club, was born in Ealing and lived at 32 Eaton Rise until 1979. His first primary school was Durston House. His mother owned and ran a maternity nursing home, Prescott House, at 34 Eaton Rise between 1942 and 1953.
- Julian Clary (1959–), comedian, went to St Benedict's School, a Roman Catholic school in Ealing.
- Charlotte Cooper (1870–1966), tennis player.
- Peter Crouch (1981–), footballer, spent his childhood living in Pitshanger Village, attending North Ealing Primary School and Drayton Manor High School.

== D ==
- Sharon Duce (1950–), popular English actress of stage, screen and television lives in Acton.

== F ==
- Henry Fielding (1707–1754), playwright, novelist and magistrate, leased a country house and farm at Fordhook, Ealing, from the summer of 1752 or possibly 1753. (The house was north of the Uxbridge Road near the Acton boundary.) It has been claimed that his novel Tom Jones was partly written here but this is unlikely as the first edition was published in February 1749 (Oxford Dictionary of National Biography).
- Peter Racine Fricker, composer, was born at 42 Colebrooke Avenue, West Ealing.

== G ==
- Jonathan Green, science fiction and fantasy writer, lives and works in Ealing.

== H ==
- Charles Hamilton (1876–1961), author of the Billy Bunter novels under the pen-name Frank Richards, was born in a house on the site now occupied by Ealing Broadway Shopping Centre. He is commemorated with a blue plaque on the site.
- Ellie Harrison, artist, was born and grew up in Ealing. Her famed project "Gold Card Adventures" uses Ealing Broadway as its starting point.
- Arthur Haynes (1914–1966), comedian, lived at 74 Gunnersbury Avenue. He is commemorated with a blue plaque.
- Ho Chi Minh (né Nguyễn Sinh Cung, 1890–1969), revolutionary and politician, worked in the kitchens of the Drayton Court in 1914.
- Thomas Henry Huxley (1825–1895), biologist known as "Darwin's Bulldog", was born in Ealing.
- Konnie Huq (1975–) is a British television presenter and writer. She is the longest-serving female presenter of Blue Peter, having presented it from 1 December 1997 until 23 January 2008.
- Rupa Huq, elected Member of Parliament (MP) for Ealing Central and Acton at the 2015 general election. She was formerly a lecturer in sociology at Kingston University.

== J ==
- Sid James (1913–1976), actor and comedian, lived at 35 Gunnersbury Avenue. He is commemorated with a blue plaque on the front of the house.

== K ==
- Jay Kay (1969–), founding member of pop band Jamiroquai, lived on Grange Road and played some of his first gigs in The Haven, a pub on Spring Bridge Road (now converted to offices) and Broadway Boulevard (now Club Karma). He attended Twyford Church of England High School in Acton.
- Shappi Khorsandi (1973–), stand-up comedian, grew up in Ealing after leaving Iran.
- Neil Kinnock (1942–), former leader of the Labour Party and European Commissioner, has his London home in Ealing.

== L ==
- John Lindley (1799–1865), botanist, is commemorated with a blue plaque situated at his home at Acton Green.
- Ian Livingstone (1962–) and his brother Richard Livingstone (1964–), co-owners of London & Regional Properties.
- Ada Lovelace (1815–1852), who was England's first computer programmer and has the programming language 'Ada' named after her. She lived with her mother, Lady Noel Byron.
- Rebecca Lowe (1980–), television presenter and anchor who works for NBC and NBC Sports, was born in Ealing.

== M ==
- Gary Martin (1958–), voice actor and actor, was born in Ealing.
- Gracie McGonigal (2002–), actress
- Paul McGrath (1959–), former Aston Villa, Manchester United, Derby County and Republic of Ireland International footballer, was born in Ealing.
- Steve McQueen (1969–), artist and film director, grew up in Hanwell and attended Drayton Manor High School.
- John McVie (1945–), bass guitarist and member of Fleetwood Mac, was born in Ealing and attended Walpole Grammar School.
- Alan Mehdizadeh, actor, grew up in Ealing
- Freddie Mercury (1946–1991), rock musician, singer and songwriter, studied at Ealing Art College.
- Mitch Mitchell (1946–2008), drummer for the Jimi Hendrix Experience, was born and grew up in Ealing.
- Matt Monro (1930–1985), ballad singer, lived at 1 Dallas Road, Ealing from 1974 until his death.

== N ==
- Nguyễn Sinh Cung – see Ho Chi Minh, above.

== O ==
- Elsie Jeanette Oxenham (1880–1960), English girls' story writer, moved to Ealing before the age of two and lived there for nearly forty years. She and her sisters went to private schools and attended Ealing Congregational Church.
- Martin Offiah (1965–) Former International Rugby League legend, immortalised in bronze outside Wembley Stadium, moved to Ealing in March 2007. He coaches his sons at Ealing Trailfinders Rugby Club.

== P ==
- Chris Patten (1944–), the last governor of Hong Kong, went to St Benedict's School.
- Murray Perahia (1947–), pianist and conductor, lives in Ealing.
- Spencer Perceval (1762–1812), Prime Minister from 1809 until his assassination, lived in a large house at Elm Grove, on the south side of Ealing Common. He is commemorated with a blue plaque.
- Fred Perry (1909–1995), English tennis player, lived in Brunner Road, Ealing. He is commemorated with a blue plaque.
- Michael Petchey (1958–), cricketer
- Andy Picheta, film and television producer and director, was born in Ealing and attended Gunnersbury Boys' School.
- Sarah Pinborough, horror writer, lives and works in Ealing.
- Edward Arthur Fellowes Prynne (1854–1921), a leading artist, lived at 1 Woodville Road in Ealing.
- George Fellowes Prynne (1853–1927), the notable church architect, lived at 3 Grange Road in Ealing.

== R ==
- Nick Reding, English actor was born in Ealing.
- Frank Richards – see Charles Hamilton, above.
- Alan Rickman (1946–2016), actor, was born and raised on Lynton Road, Acton.
- Rose Williams grew up in Hanwell, Ealing. She is known for starring in Reign and Sanditon).
- Alec Rowley (1892–1958), composer, was born in Ealing.

== S ==
- Bukayo Saka, footballer, plays for Arsenal and the England national team, was born in Greenford, and attended Greenford High School in the borough of Ealing.
- Eric Scerri, historian and philosopher of science, author, now lecturer at UCLA in Los Angeles attended Walpole Grammar School.
- Leonard Shuffrey (1872–1926), architect and architectural designer, lived at Thorncote, the house he designed on Edgehill Road.
- Nevil Shute, aeronautical engineer and novelist, remembered for such books as A Town Like Alice and On the Beach, was a past resident (16 Somerset Rd).
- Ronald Skirth (1897–1977), World War I soldier, teacher and author of memoir The Reluctant Tommy, lived in Ealing for over fifty years.
- Elisabeth Sladen (1946–2011), actress, lived in Ealing and died in Southall.
- Ernest Smythe (1904–1975), cricketer and Indian Army officer, was born in Ealing.
- Dusty Springfield (1939–1999), soul singer, lived in Kent Gardens, West Ealing during the 1950s, attending St Anne's Convent School in Northfields and later working at Bentalls department store in Ealing Broadway.
- Sir Andrew Strauss (1977–), former England cricketer, currently lives in Ealing.
- P. F. Strawson (1919–2006), English philosopher and Waynflete Professor of Metaphysical Philosophy at the University of Oxford, was born in Ealing.
- Phil Swern, English record and radio producer, best known for producing Pick of the Pops and Sounds of the 60s on BBC Radio 2; and for producing "We Do It" for R&J Stone in 1976, and "Black Pearl" for Horace Faith in 1970.

== T ==
- Colin Thompson (1942–), children's author, was born at the Old Court Nursing Home on Hanger Lane. He attended Savernake Kindergarten, Durston House School and Ealing Art School.
- Pete Townshend (1945–), rock guitarist, vocalist and songwriter for The Who, lived in Ealing Common with his parents and attended Ealing Art School.

== W ==
- Edward Stanley Watkins (1853-1928) a British designer and creator of decorative art for churches, whose work can be found across the United Kingdom. Watkins lived at 39 Ranelagh Road in South Ealing, and his stained glass can be found in the chapels of South Ealing Cemetery, and in St Mellitus's Church, Hanwell.
- Bombardier Billy Wells (1889–1967), heavyweight boxing champion and Rank Organisation "gongman", died in Ealing; his ashes were laid to rest in the crypt of St. Mary's Church in neighbouring Hanwell.
- William Willett (1856–1915), promoter of British Summer Time, lived in Acton. He is commemorated with a blue plaque.

== Y ==
- William Frederick Yeames (1835–1918), artist, is commemorated with a blue plaque on the south side of Campbell Road, near Hanwell railway station.

== Musical groups ==
- Brand New Heavies, acid jazz group, were formed in Ealing.
- Furniture, New Wave, Synthpop group were formed in Ealing in 1979.
- White Lies, indie band, live in and are from Ealing.
- The Magic Numbers were formed in Hanwell.
