= Ealing Common =

Common land in Ealing, London, England

Coordinates: 51.510°N 0.294°W

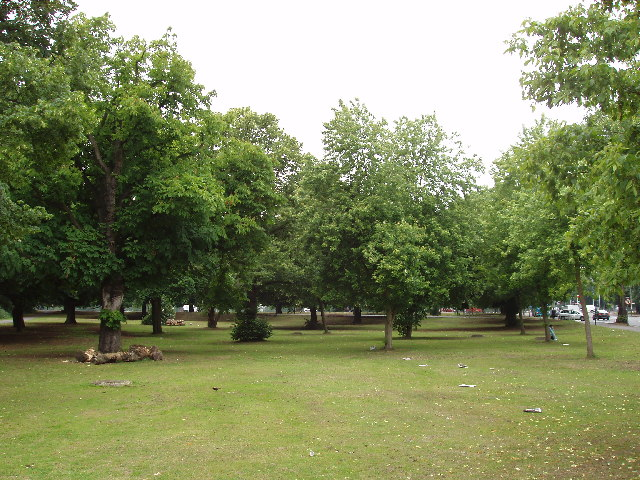
Ealing Common

Ealing Common's location in London

Ealing Common is a large open space (approx 47 acres or 19 hectares) in Ealing, West London.

== Boundaries ==
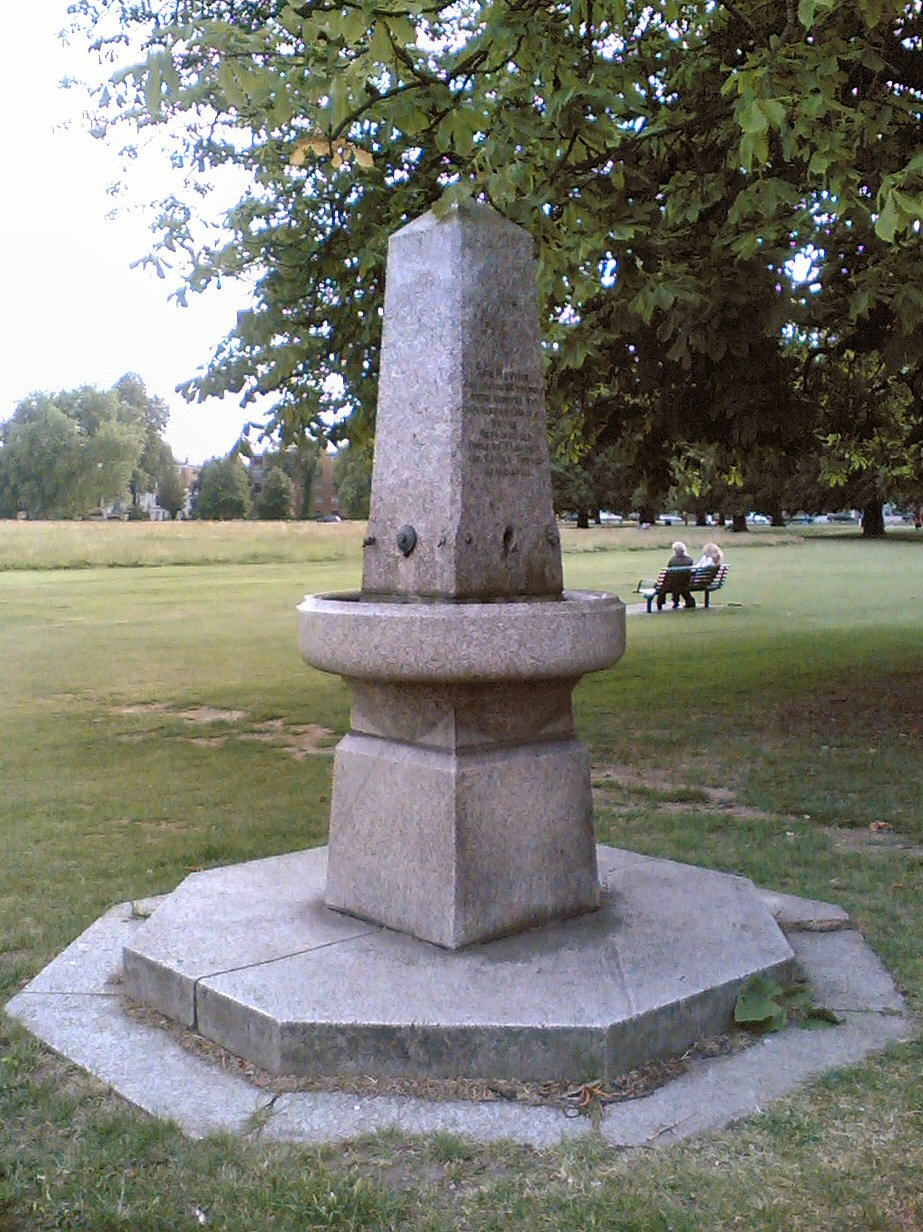
Old drinking fountain

The Ealing Common Area is bounded by Ealing Town Centre to the west, North Ealing and Hanger Hill to the north, Acton to the east and South Ealing and South Acton to the south.

The Ealing Common open space is bounded by Gunnersbury Ave (A406) to the east and the Uxbridge Road to the north. A smaller area of the common extends to the east of Gunnersbury Ave, including Leopold Road. The western boundary includes The Common and Warwick Dene, with Elm Avenue to the south. Some distance to the south is also the much larger Gunnersbury Park.

== Ownership ==
The Ealing Common open space is a common land as designated by the 1866 Metropolitan Commons Act.

== History ==
In August 1733 a cricket match was played on the common between Ealing & Acton and London Cricket Club.

== Flora ==
Ealing Common preserves a large area of open space with fine avenues of horse chestnut trees, most of which were planted in the late Victorian period, following the purchase of the common land by the Ealing Local Board. The northern part of the common has a large English oak tree at its centre, and London plane trees are also found with the horse chestnuts around the perimeter of the common. Charles Jones was the borough surveyor responsible for the layout.

In the south-west corner of Ealing Common there is a small enclosed park, called Warwick Dene, with rose beds at its centre.

== Other information ==
There is a local Conservation Area which includes streets around the common.

Ealing Common is also informally used by some as the name of the area in the London Borough of Ealing surrounding Ealing Common station, which is named after the common; however, it is officially part of the Ealing district.
