= Municipal Borough of Ealing =

Former local government area in the UK

Coordinates: 51.5130°N 0.3076°W

Ealing
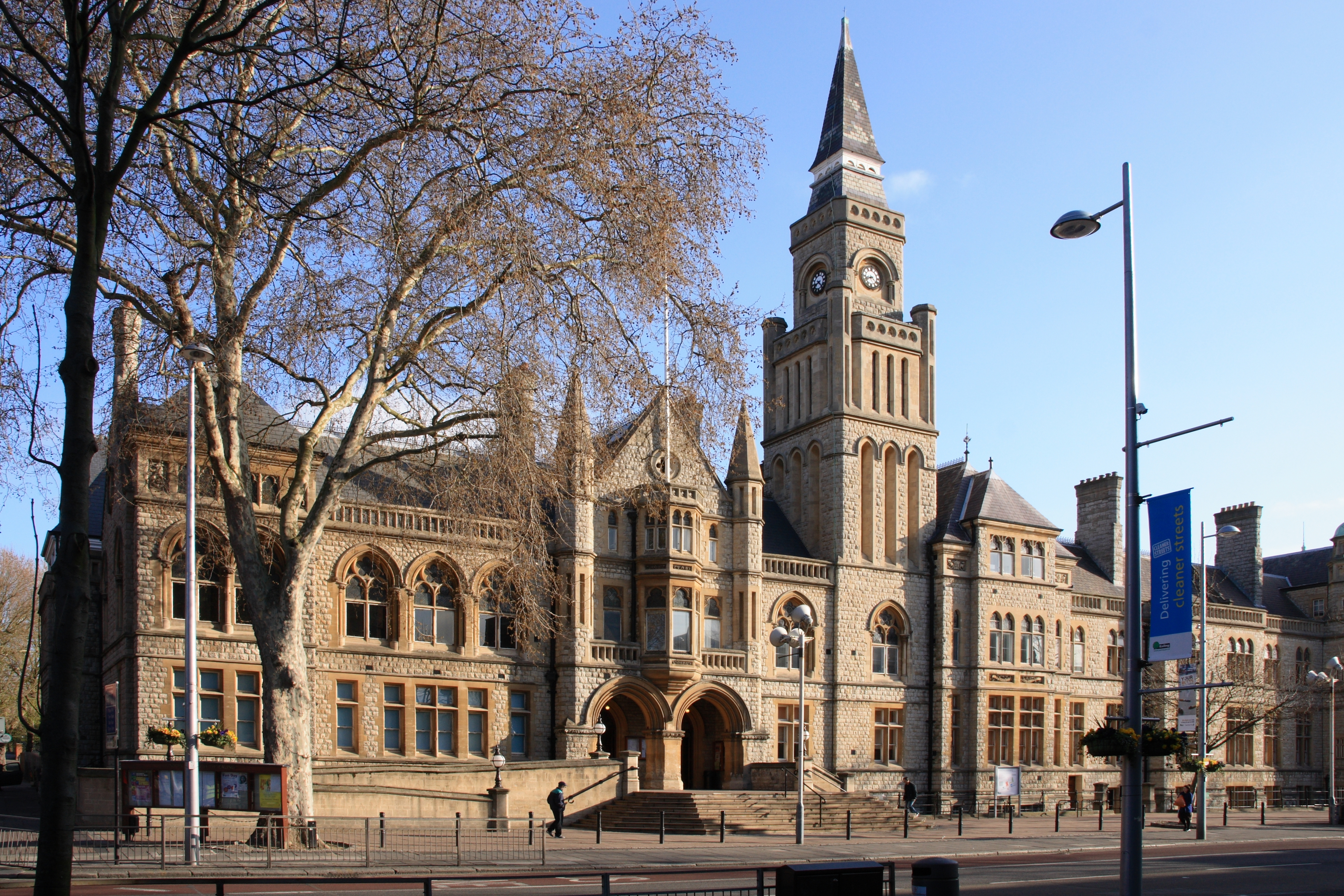
- Ealing Town Hall

- Ealing within Middlesex in 1961
- Area
  - 1894: 2,947 acres (11.9 km^{2})
  - 1965: 8,783 acres (35.5 km^{2})
- Population
  - 1901: 33,031
  - 1961: 183,077
- History
  - Created: 1863
  - Abolished: 1965
  - Succeeded by: London Borough of Ealing
- Status: Local board of health 1863 - 1894; Urban district 1894 - 1901; Municipal borough 1901 - 1965
- Government
  - HQ: Ealing
  - Motto: Respice Prospice (Look backward, look forward)
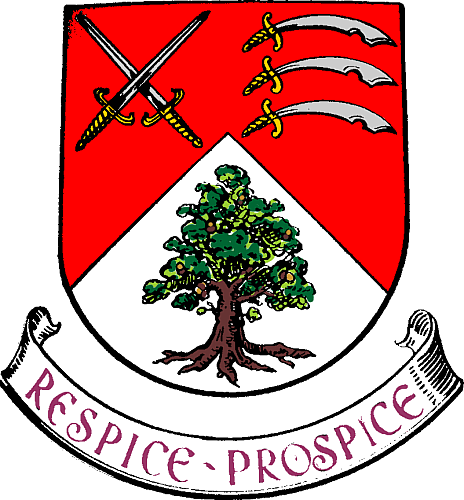

Ealing was a local government district from 1863 to 1965 around the town of Ealing which formed part of the built up area of London until 1965, where it became part of Greater London.

== History ==
A local board of health was formed for the southern part of the parish of Ealing, Middlesex, in 1863. In 1873 the board's area was extended to the rest of the parish.

It was created an urban district in 1894, by the Local Government Act 1894. In 1901 it was granted a charter of incorporation to become the first municipal borough in Middlesex. The urban district council was replaced by a corporation consisting of a mayor, 6 aldermen and 18 councillors.

Ealing Town Hall was built in 1886, replacing an earlier hall on the same site. The architect was Charles Jones, who also designed several other buildings and features in the borough.

The borough was greatly enlarged in 1926 when it absorbed the urban districts of Greenford (including the parishes of Perivale and West Twyford) and Hanwell. Accordingly, the size of the borough council was increased: by 1960 it consisted of a mayor, 16 aldermen and 48 councillors. In 1952 there was a failed attempt to gain county borough status.

In 1965, under the London Government Act 1963, the municipal borough was abolished and its former area transferred to Greater London to be combined with the Municipal Borough of Acton and Municipal Borough of Southall to form the present-day London Borough of Ealing. An oak in its coat of arms features, smaller, in the coat of arms of the London Borough of Ealing.

== Coat of arms ==
Granted on 22 February 1902, the Municipal Borough's coat of arms (not to be confused with the modern borough's coat of arms) was: Per chevron gules and argent, in dexter chief two swords in saltire and in sinister chief three seaxes (Saxon swords) fessewise in pale all proper, with pommels and hilts or, and in base an oak tree eradicated (uprooted) also proper. The crossed swords are the symbol of Saint Paul and taken from the arms of the See of London, to which the manor historically belonged. The seaxes are from the arms of the county of Middlesex, and the tree was a symbol that Ealing is growing and flourishing.

== See also ==
- Local Government Act 1894
- London Government Act 1963
