= St David's Home =

St David's Home is a nursing home in Castlebar Hill, Ealing, London. The main building was formerly Kent House, a residence of the Duke of Kent originally built in the 1780s.

A house in this location was initially constructed in the 1780s by Henry Beaufoy as Castle Hill Lodge. It was sold in 1795 to Maria Fitzherbert, and then in 1801 to Edward, Duke of Kent, father of Queen Victoria. Following the Duke's death, Castle Hill Lodge was bought by Frederick Augustus Wetherall, and his son George Wetherall rebuilt the building as Kent House.

In 1918, Lady Anne Kerr along with others established St David's Home for Disabled Soldiers, Sailors and Airmen, in memory of Kerr's son David Anselm Kerr, an officer in the Scots Guards who had been killed in 1914 at the age of 21. The empty Kent House was purchased in 1918, and the home was opened on 17 October 1918 by Cardinal Bourne. An adjoining chapel in the same style as the house was constructed by 1922. Nursing was delivered by Catholic nuns: first the Franciscan Missionaries of Mary, then from 1920 the Daughters of Charity of Saint Vincent de Paul.

St David's Home did not become part of the National Health Service when it was established in 1948. Along with many smaller specialist and religious hospitals, it was explicitly disclaimed from the service. By 1955, an advertisement in The British Medical Journal reported that the home had 60 beds across multiple small wards, and admitted men of all denominations.

Queen Elizabeth II visited St David's Home in 1993 to celebrate its 75th anniversary.

The home was sold to Gold Care Homes in July 2024.
