= Greenford Urban District =

Former local government area in the UK

Coordinates: 51.533616°N 0.327605°W

- Area
  - 1921: 3,042 acres (12.31 km^{2})
- Population
  - 1921: 1,461
- Density
  - 1921: 0.5/acre
- History
  - Created: 1894
  - Abolished: 1926
- Status: Urban District
- Government: Greenford Urban District Council

Greenford Urban District was an urban district of Middlesex, England, from 1894 to 1926.

It was formed from the parishes of Greenford, Perivale and West Twyford. It replaced the Brentford rural sanitary district, which covered these parishes.

Parish	Area (1901)	Population (1901)	Population (1921)
Greenford	2,127 acres (8.61 km^{2})	672	1,199
Perivale	633 acres (2.56 km^{2})	60	114
West Twyford	281 acres (1.14 km^{2})	87	148

It was abolished in 1926 and its former area was absorbed by the Municipal Borough of Ealing.
