= Ealing Village =

1930s Art Deco estate in West London

Coordinates: 51.5160°N 0.2948°W

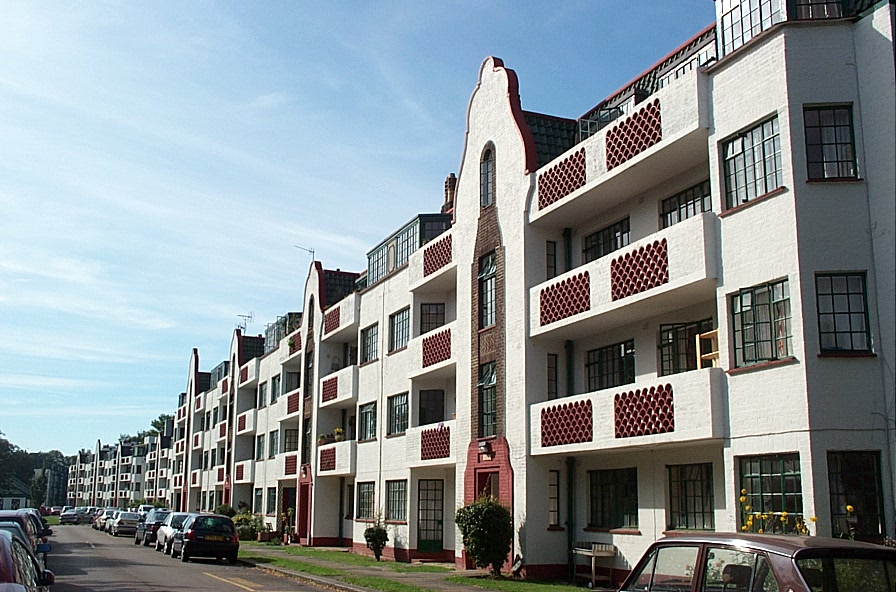
- Ealing Village block 5, seen from the courtyard
- Location: Ealing, London, England
- Built: 1934–1936
- Architectural style: Dutch Colonial Revival / Art Deco

Listed Building – Grade II
- Official name: 1-24, Ealing Village; 25-48, Ealing Village; 49-72, Ealing Village; 73-96, Ealing Village; 97-128, Ealing Village; 129 and 130, Ealing Village; 131-132, Ealing Village; Clubroom; Swimming Pool with Tiled Surround and Plant Room
- Designated: 21 March 1991
- Reference no.: 1263526; 1079332; 1249903; 1358802; 1249907; 1249908; 1358803; 1079335; 1249909

Ealing Village's location in London

Ealing Village is a private residential estate located just off Hanger Lane, North Circular in Ealing, West London. Constructed between 1934 and 1936, the estate comprises five blocks of flats and two porters lodges designed in a blend of Dutch Colonial Revival and Art Deco architectural styles. The development was designed by R. Toms & Partners for the Bell Property Company. Several structures within the estate, including the swimming pool, clubroom, and multiple lamp posts, have been granted Grade II listed status by Historic England.

== History ==
Ealing Village was developed during the interwar period, a time when Ealing was transitioning into a suburban area. The estate was envisioned as a self-contained community with amenities such as a swimming pool, tennis court, and clubhouse to attract residents, including those associated with the nearby Ealing Studios. Despite initial marketing efforts targeting film stars, the flats were predominantly occupied by film crew members and technicians.

The estate was entirely rental-only until 1980, when the flats were first offered for purchase, marking a major shift in its residential structure

In 1991, the estate was granted Grade II status by Historic England for its architectural and historic importance. Its listing helps protect the estate’s original design and character and ensures any alterations preserve its heritage value.

Ealing Village is also recognised as a site of local interest by the London Borough of Ealing, which highlights the estate’s architectural and cultural value in its local planning and conservation documents.

== Architecture ==
The architectural style of Ealing Village is a mixture of Dutch Colonial Revival and Art Deco influences. The estate consists of five main blocks arranged around landscaped open courtyards. The buildings feature curved gables, multi-pane Crittall windows, steep green-tile roofs, and other period details. The estate is described by Bridget Cherry, in her London 3: North West volume in the Pevsner Buildings of England series, revised and reissued in 2002; "more glamorous aspirations of the inter-war period are represented by the Dutch-Colonial-Baroque frontages of Ealing Village, 1934-36 by R. Toms and Partners".

Communal facilities were a central part of the estate's original vision. These included:

- swimming pool, which features yellow tiles, a covered walkway and a central pedestal with a lion's head fountain (water slide and diving board featured in the original layout too, but were subsequently removed for safety reasons)
- tennis court
- private clubhouse with a grand piano, billiard tables, and social areas.

All of the communal facilities have separate Grade II listings, as do all of the lamp posts in the estate.

Concrete lids by the roadway indicate the site of wartime air raid shelters.

== Gallery ==
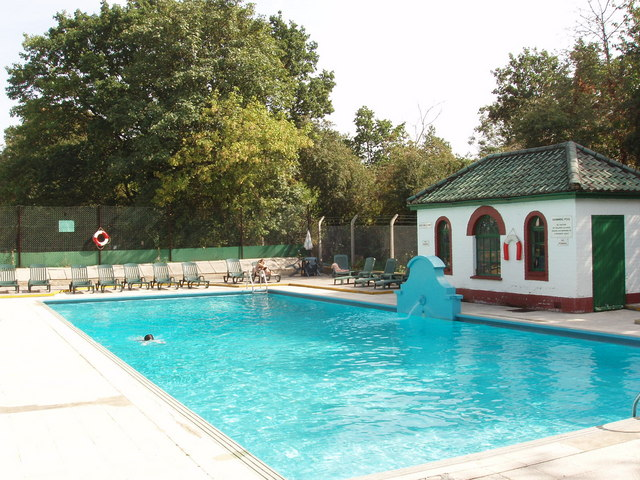
Swimming pool, Ealing Village

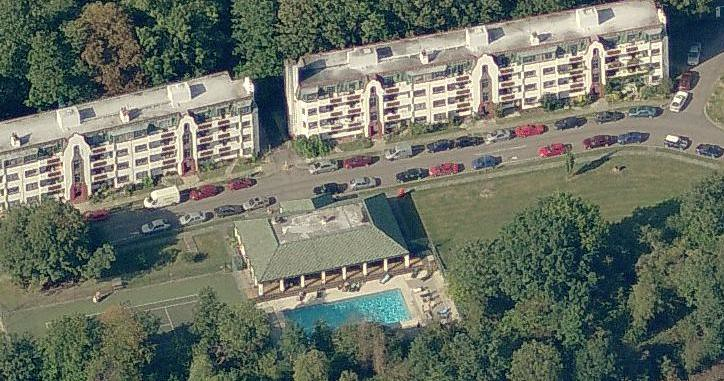
Ealing Village Aerial View

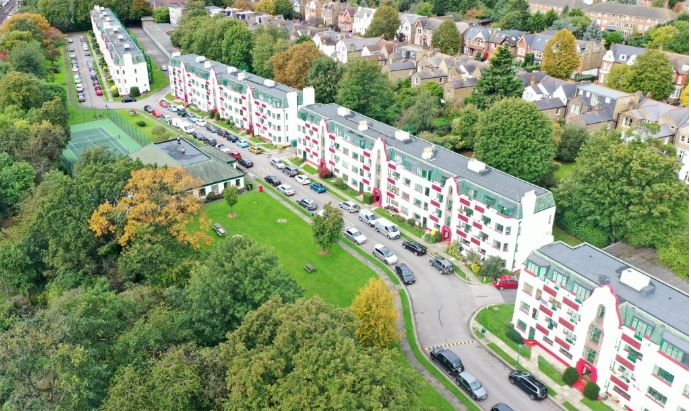
Ealing Village Bird's-eye View

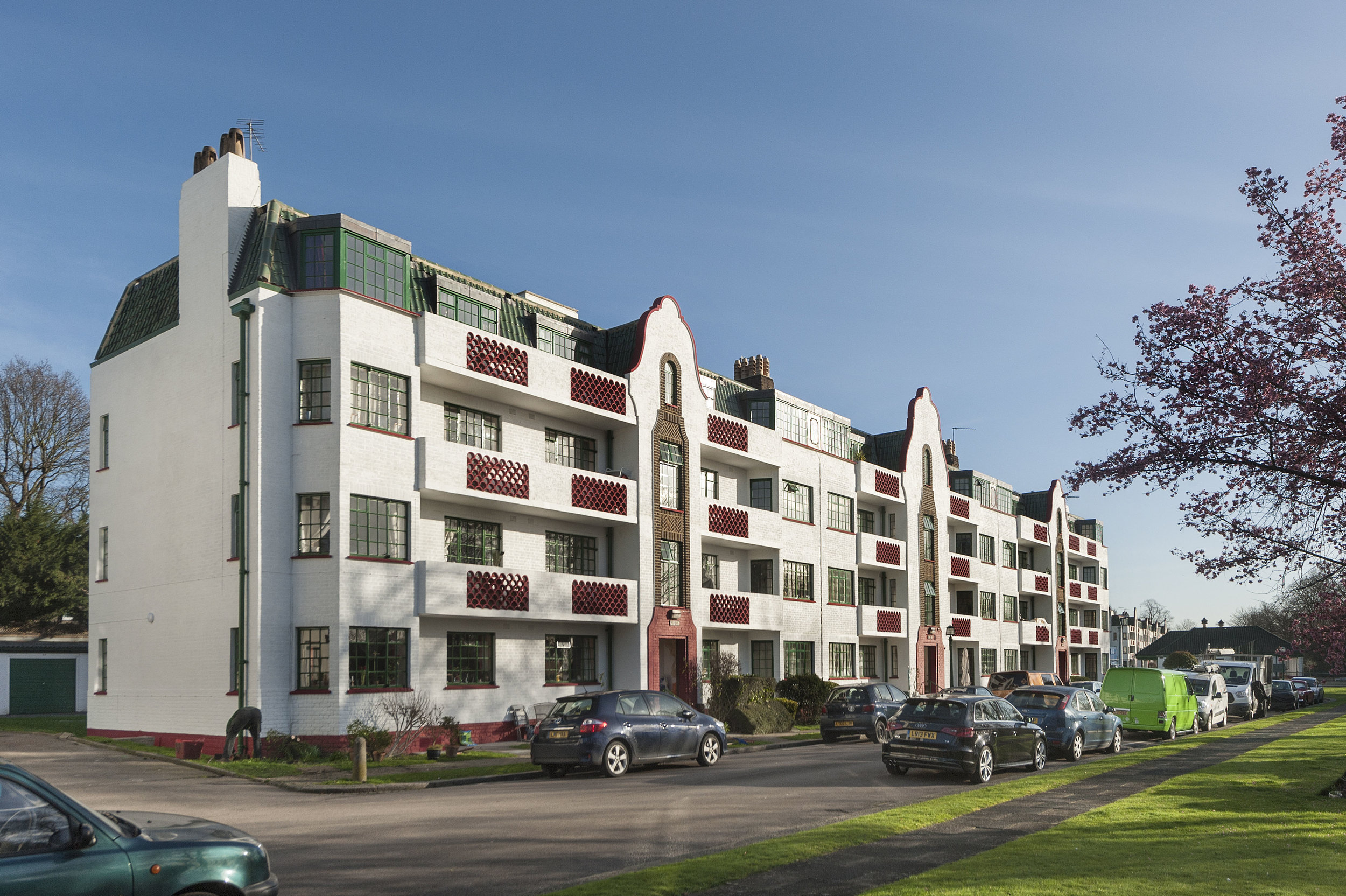
Ealing Village Block 2

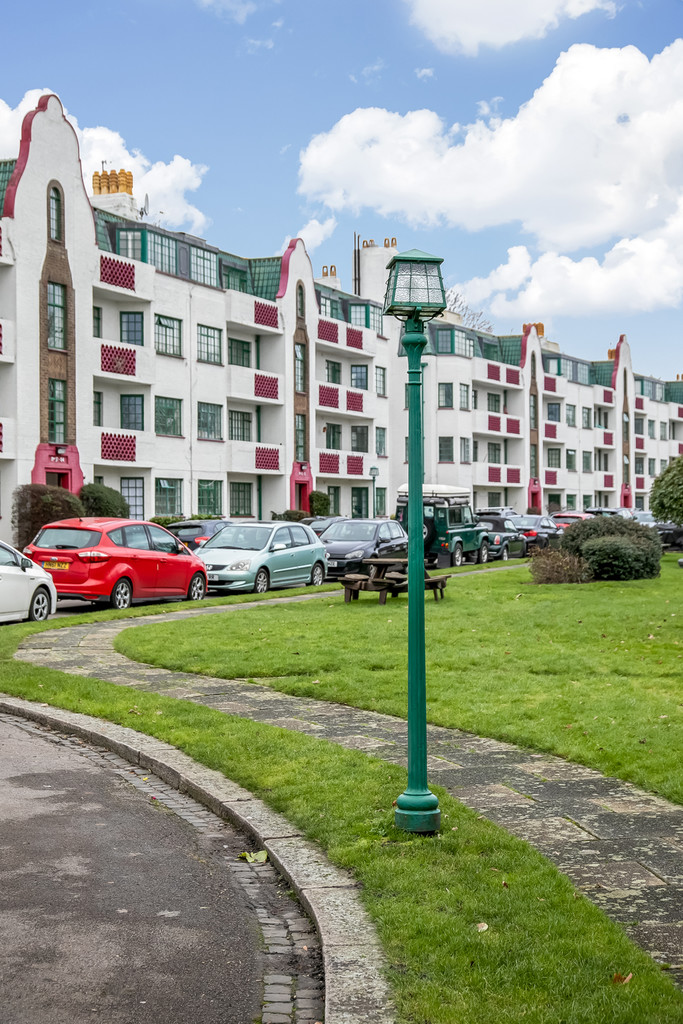
Ealing Village Lamp Post with block 3 & 4 behind

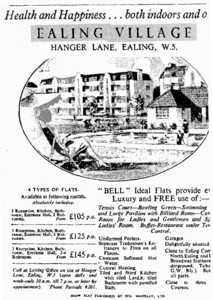
Ealing Village 1930's newspaper ad

== See also ==
- Ealing Studios
- Dutch Colonial Revival architecture
- Art Deco

== Sources ==
- Bull, Andy (2022). A-Z of Ealing: Places-People-History. Stroud: Amberley Publishing. ISBN 978-1-398-11065-6. OCLC 1314284573.
- Cherry, Bridget; Pevsner, Nikolaus (2002). London 3: North West. Pevsner Buildings of England. New Haven, US and London: Yale University Press. ISBN 978-0-300-09652-1. OCLC 844442257.
- Harwood, Elain (2019). Art Deco Britain: Buildings of the Interwar Years. London: Batsford Books. ISBN 978-1-849-94527-1. OCLC 1109860012.
- Oates, Jonathan; Hounsell, Peter (2014). Ealing: A Concise History. Stroud: Amberley Publishing. ISBN 978-1-445-63369-5. OCLC 890393896.
