= Montpelier, London =

Coordinates: 51.52306°N 0.30587°W

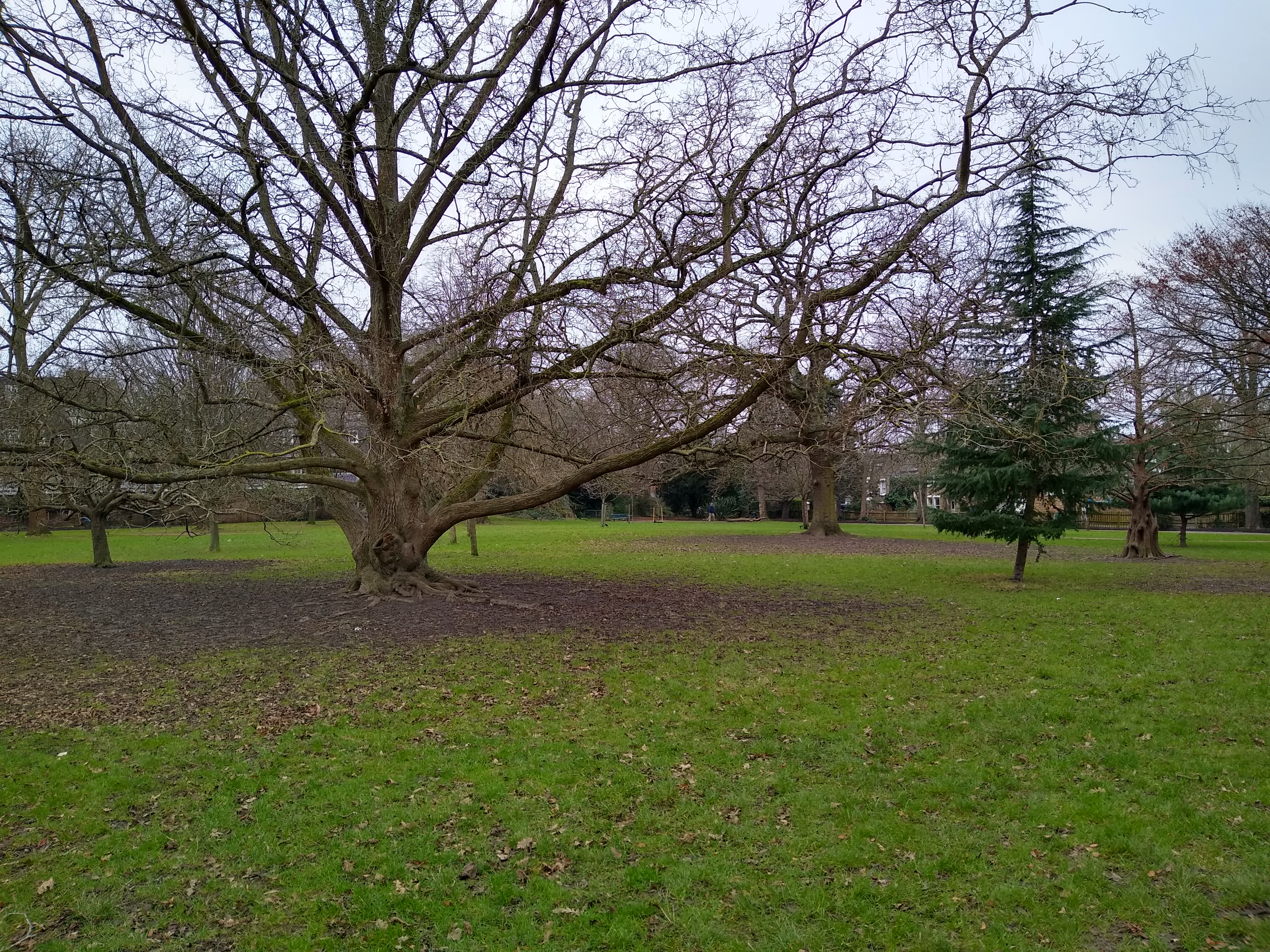
Montpelier Park

Montpelier is a small suburb, located a little way north of Ealing Broadway in west London.

Nearby places include Ealing Broadway, Pitshanger, West Ealing, and Hanwell.

The route of the Ealing Half Marathon passes through Montpelier.

== Notable former pupils ==
- Rupa Huq, Member of Parliament for Ealing Central and Acton
