= West Twyford =

Coordinates: 51.538026°N 0.284252°W

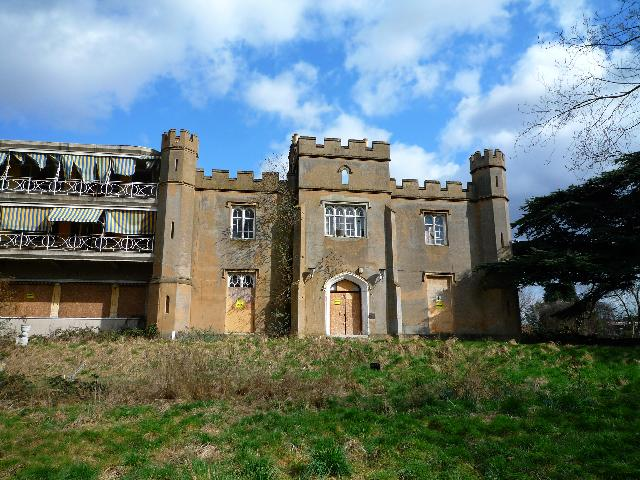
- Twyford Abbey west elevation

- Location within Greater London
- OS grid reference: TQ205805
- London borough: Ealing
- Ceremonial county: Greater London
- Region: London
- Country: England
- Sovereign state: United Kingdom
- Post town: LONDON
- Postcode district: NW10
- Dialling code: 020
- Police: Metropolitan
- Fire: London
- Ambulance: London
- UK Parliament: Ealing Central and Acton
- London Assembly: Ealing and Hillingdon

West Twyford (also known as Twyford Abbey) is a small residential area in the northeast of the London Borough of Ealing in West London. It is situated northeast of Hanger Lane station, north of Park Royal and south of the River Brent. It was historically an extra-parochial area, then civil parish (1866-1926), in Middlesex, England.

== Extent ==
Traditionally defined as 281 acres (1.14 km^{2}), it is today by common consensus smaller, bounded by the Hanger Lane gyratory to the west, the A406 North Circular and the River Brent to the north, Park Royal to the south and Harlesden to the east.

The long circular road Lakeside Drive in the south is historically part, a contemporaneous section of Park Royal reinforced by being in that part in the London Borough of Brent. The Borough of Ealing has west London postcodes save for the NW postcode of West Twyford shared with its neighbours including North Acton and Park Royal.

== History ==
The area now known as West Twyford began as a manor house in the thirteenth century. A small community built up to the west around St Mary's Church which had originally been a chapel belonging to the manor house. The house was rebuilt from 1807 and renamed as Twyford Abbey, despite not housing any religious order. In 1902 the Alexian Order took over the manor house as a nursing home. The brothers ran short of funds in 1988 and joined another part of their order in Manchester.

The house, which is a Grade II listed building, now lies derelict. It is next to St Mary's Church.

Various applications for planning permission were made over the years but refused, until in 2022 permission was granted by Ealing Council to build 326 flats in seven blocks around the site, with the main entrance being onto Twyford Abbey Road. The development will retain some elements of the old building at the centre of the site. The development is due to be completed in 2026.

The name Twyford relates to Twyford Brook. The brook now runs almost entirely underground. It formerly fed the Guinness brewery in Park Royal. The word itself 'Twyford' is said to mean 'Two Fords'.

The area became a civil parish under the Extra-Parochial Places Act 1857 (20 Vict. c. 19) and formed part of Greenford Urban District from 1894. In 1901 it occupied an area of 281 acres (1.14 km^{2}) and had a population of 97. In 1913 the parish was renamed from "Twyford Abbey" to "West Twyford". On 1 October 1926 the parish was abolished and merged with Ealing and became part of the Municipal Borough of Ealing. At the 1921 census (the last before the abolition of the parish), West Twyford had a population of 148. Then in 1934 it was transferred to the Municipal Borough of Willesden. The area now forms part of Greater London.

Much of the housing on Twyford Abbey Road was originally built by Guinness in order to house employees working in at the brewery in Park Royal. Abbeyfields Close is one such residential development, built in 1984 around a series of communal gardens, on land formerly owned by Guinness.

The parish of St Mary's was combined with the parish of the Church of the Ascension in neighbouring Hanger Hill. In the 1950s the chapel of St Mary's was extended with a new large church building, which later fell into disrepair and disuse, due to safety issues. In 2010 the new church was totally renovated to become a community hall and the original chapel was re-dedicated to St Mary to become the church again. The church itself is quite tiny, having originally been the chapel of Twyford Abbey, located just behind. St Mary's churchyard contains one of the oldest headstones in Middlesex.

== Transport ==
Bus route 226 runs through Twyford Abbey Road towards Ealing Central and Golders Green (via Harlesden). Routes 83, 95 and 112 also stop nearby on the Hanger Lane Gyratory and the A406 North Circular Road, respectively. These buses run towards Ealing Hospital (via Ealing Broadway), Shepherd's Bush, Southall and Brent Cross, as well as Golders Green (via Wembley).

West Twyford is close to two London Underground stations:

- Hanger Lane (Central line)
- Park Royal (Piccadilly line)

== Amenities ==
West Twyford is well served for groceries, banking, post office and health services at the nearby 'Park Royal Neighbourhood Centre' where there is also a Lebanese Restaurant, a Spice Shack restaurant and Subway cafe. A new building is going up at the moment on Acton Lane next to the Central Middlesex Hospital which will have retail and restaurant space on the ground floor.

The Royale Leisure Park in Park Royal, is situated immediately to the south of the A40 and West Twyford and accessed by the underpass by Park Royal tube station. The Boden flagship store is located next to Park Royal Tube station.

== Education ==
West Twyford Primary School caters for children from 3 to 11 years old.

== Sport and Leisure ==
West Twyford Park was formerly called Bodiam Fields, after the area of the same name in Sussex, where hops were grown for the Guinness brewery. There are plans for improvements to West Twyford Park as well as new lakeside walks and cycle paths nearby. The Grand Union Canal runs through West Twyford and provides level pathways alongside for walking a running. It is a short walk along the canalside to the Grand Junction Pub, which has much outdoor seating alongside the canal. The pathway continues to Little Venice and Paddington.

== Culture and community ==
There are a number of active community projects in West Twyford, including the 'West Twyford Community and Youth' project and 'West Twyford Children’s Centre'. The latter provides a range of services and activities, including mother and toddler groups, health services, daycare, before and after school clubs, Women into Work and English classes.

St Mary’s Church Community Hall, on Brentmead Gardens provides a range of activities for local people.

== Future ==
West Twyford will soon benefit from a new public plaza with shops, cafes, a restaurant and health and fitness club. There will also be new public play, games and fitness areas in West Twyford Park. There will be an improved pedestrian/cycle route from West Twyford to Park Royal Underground station, and the station itself is also due to be improved. The public park, walkways two children's playgrounds plus a new games court are now completed, however the plaza seems to be on hold for the time being.

In the Mayor's plans for the Park Royal Opportunity Area, it says that one of their objectives is to obtain public access to the grounds of Twyford Abbey heritage site.
