= Hanger Hill =

Area of London

Coordinates: 51.5194°N 0.283°W

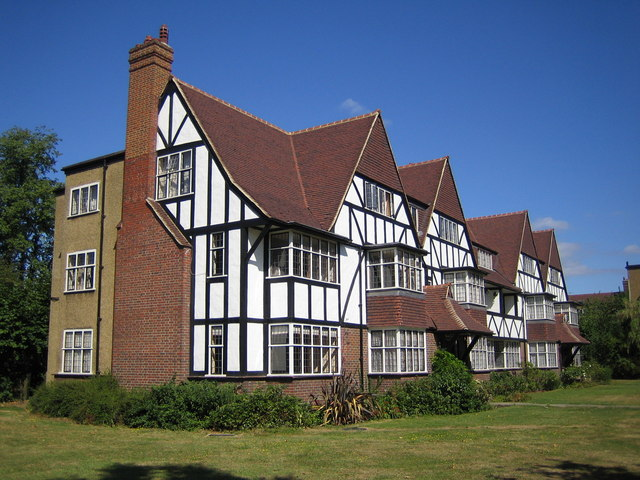
Typical Tudor Revival flats on Monks Drive, in the Garden Estate

Hanger Hill or Haymills Estate is a local area of the London Borough of Ealing around Hanger Lane (A406 road). It was developed in the interwar period when affluent Londoners began to move out of Central London for more green spaces. The estate features spacious houses and flats designed by architects Douglas Smith and Barley.

== Housing ==
The area was developed during the interwar period as two separate estates - the Hanger Hill Garden Estate and the Haymills Estate to the east of Hanger Lane. The estates were developed to feature large, spacious family houses and flats.

The Hanger Hill Garden Estate includes Queens Drive, Links Road, Monks Drive and Princes Gardens, and was built between 1928 and 1936 to designs by architects Douglas Smith and Barley. This was designated a conservation area in 1969.

The Haymills Estate is further north, built on the site of Hanger Hill House. This estate is laid out in distinctive crescents and includes Tudor Revival, Neo-Georgian and Moderne houses. It was designated as a separate conservation area in 1996.

== Amenities ==
Residents of the estates benefit from Hanger Hill Garden Estate Residents Association (HHGERA) and the Hanger Hill (East) Residents Association (HHERA). The Garden Estate Residents' Association manages some of the communal gardens and service roads (those that are collectively owned by the houses part of the estate).

The nearest London Underground stations are Hanger Lane, Park Royal, West Acton and North Ealing.

The Hanger Hill ward features Hanger Hill Park which includes a fragment of oak woodland to the west, now a nature reserve

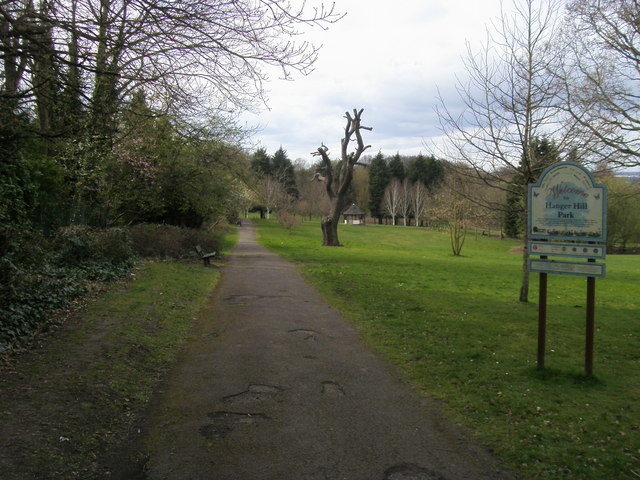
Hanger Hill Park

== Nearby areas ==
- Ealing
- West Twyford and Park Royal
- Pitshanger and Montpelier
- West Acton
