= Ealing Broadway Centre =

Ealing Broadway
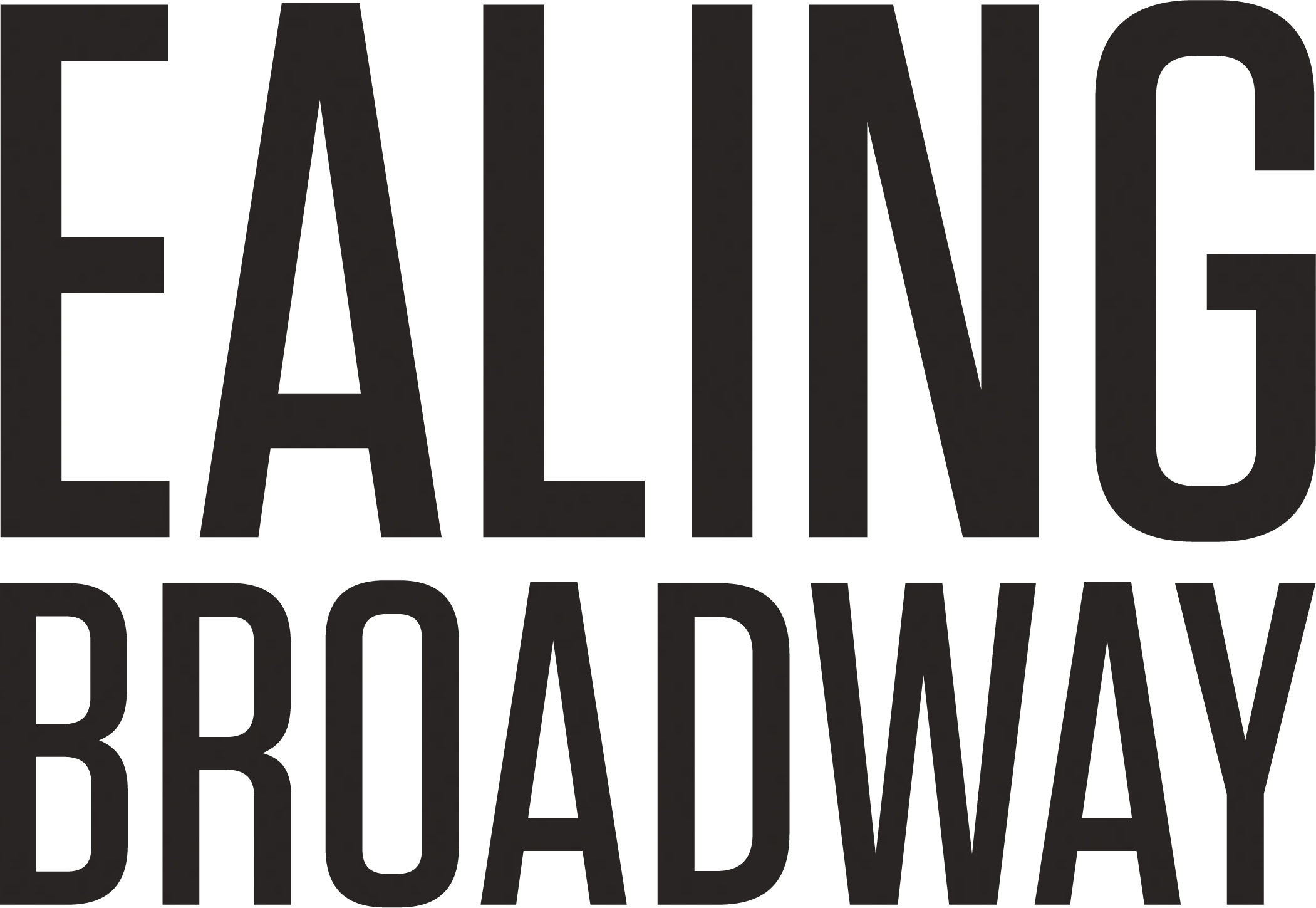

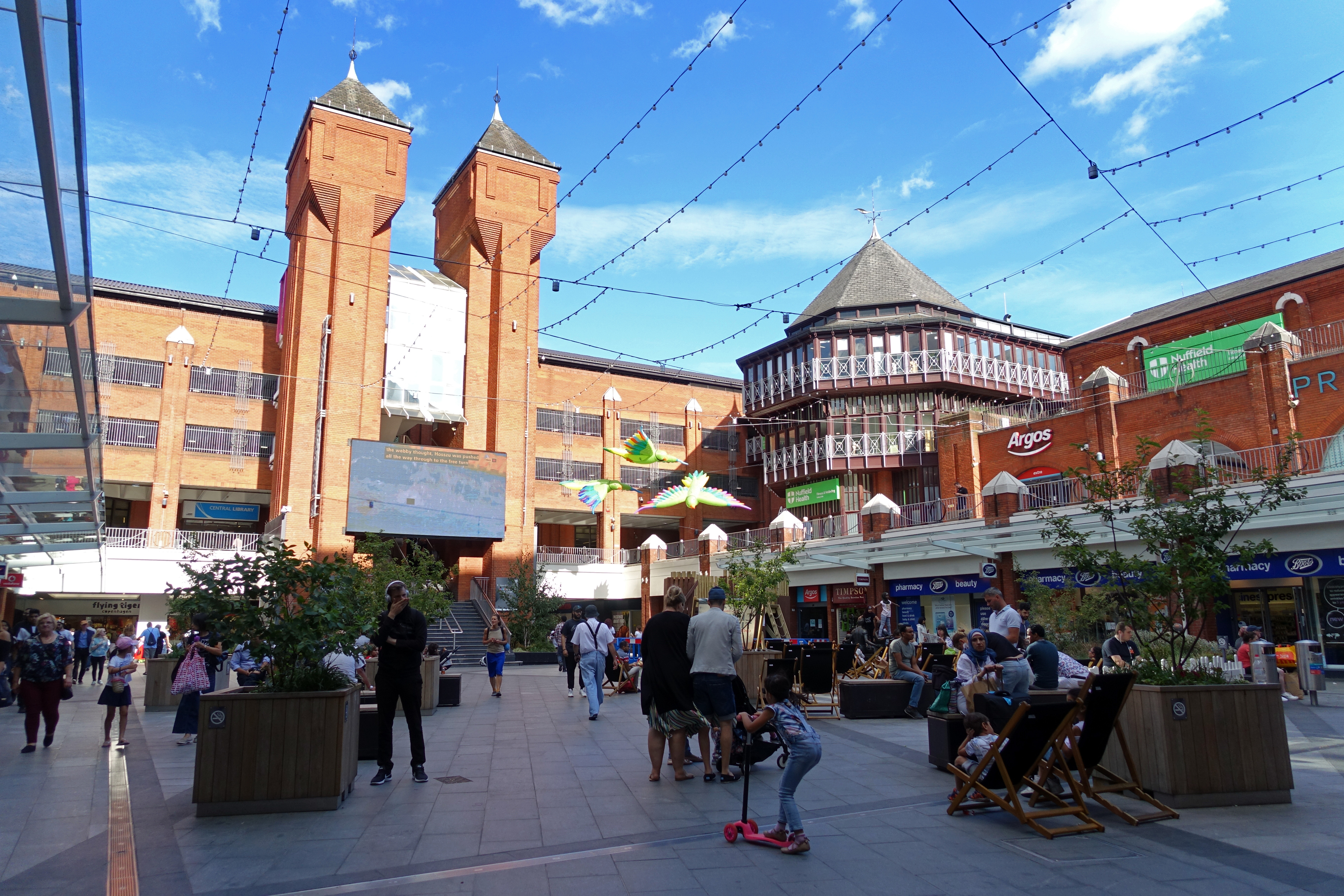
- Inside the centre's courtyard
- Location: Ealing, London, England
- Coordinates: 51.512°N 0.303°W
- Opened: 7 March 1985; 41 years ago
- Owner: British Land
- Num. of stores: 85
- Floor area: 470,000 sq ft (44,000 m^{2})
- Parking: 800 spaces
- Website: www.ealingbroadwayshopping.co.uk

The Ealing Broadway Centre, currently branded as simply Ealing Broadway, is a shopping centre in Ealing, west London. Located on The Broadway close by Ealing Broadway station, the centre consists of 85 units both indoor and a courtyard part outdoor. It was opened on 7 March 1985 by The Queen and the complex includes the town square and the Ealing Central Library.

== History ==
Ealing Broadway was designed by Keith Scott of Building Design Partnership. The 12 acres (4.9 ha) site cost £60 million to build, and was built on a site that formerly consisted of housing. The development also consisted of office space, a library, a gym, and two sculptures: The Family and The Horse.

It was complemented by a smaller shopping centre adjacent to it, built 1986 at a former 19th century department store called Sayers under the name The Waterglade Centre, and later renamed The Arcadia. The Arcadia was redeveloped in the mid-2010s and replaced by 1-8 Broadway.

The Ealing Broadway Centre was first refurbished in 2002.

The shopping centre has been owned by British Land since 2013 who purchased it from Wereldhave.

== Gallery ==
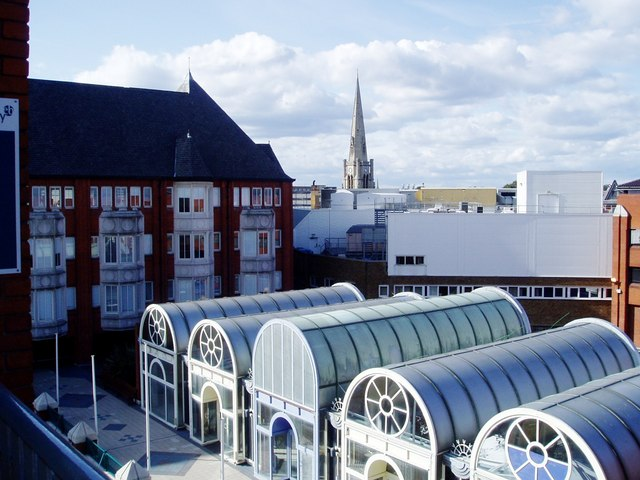
Roof top of Ealing Broadway Centre; in the background is the spire of Christ the Saviour Church

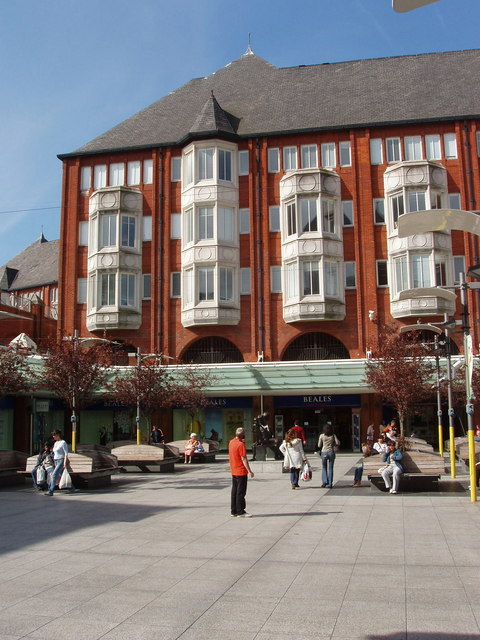
Inside the courtyard

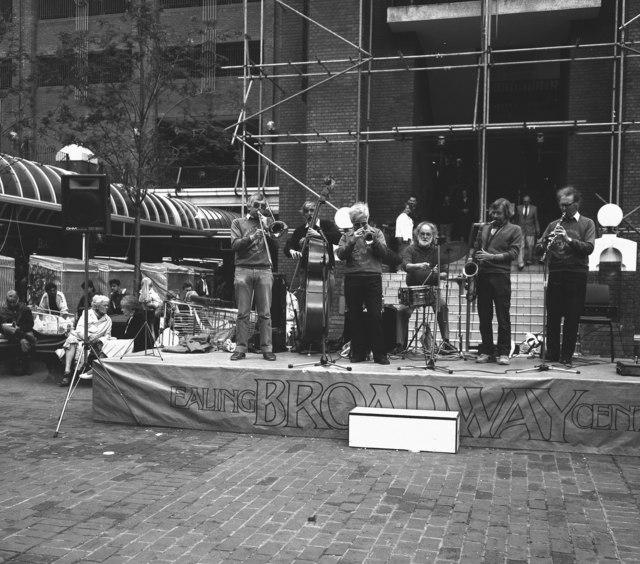
A jazz band performing in the centre (1990)
