= The Drayton Court =

Hotel and pub in Ealing, London

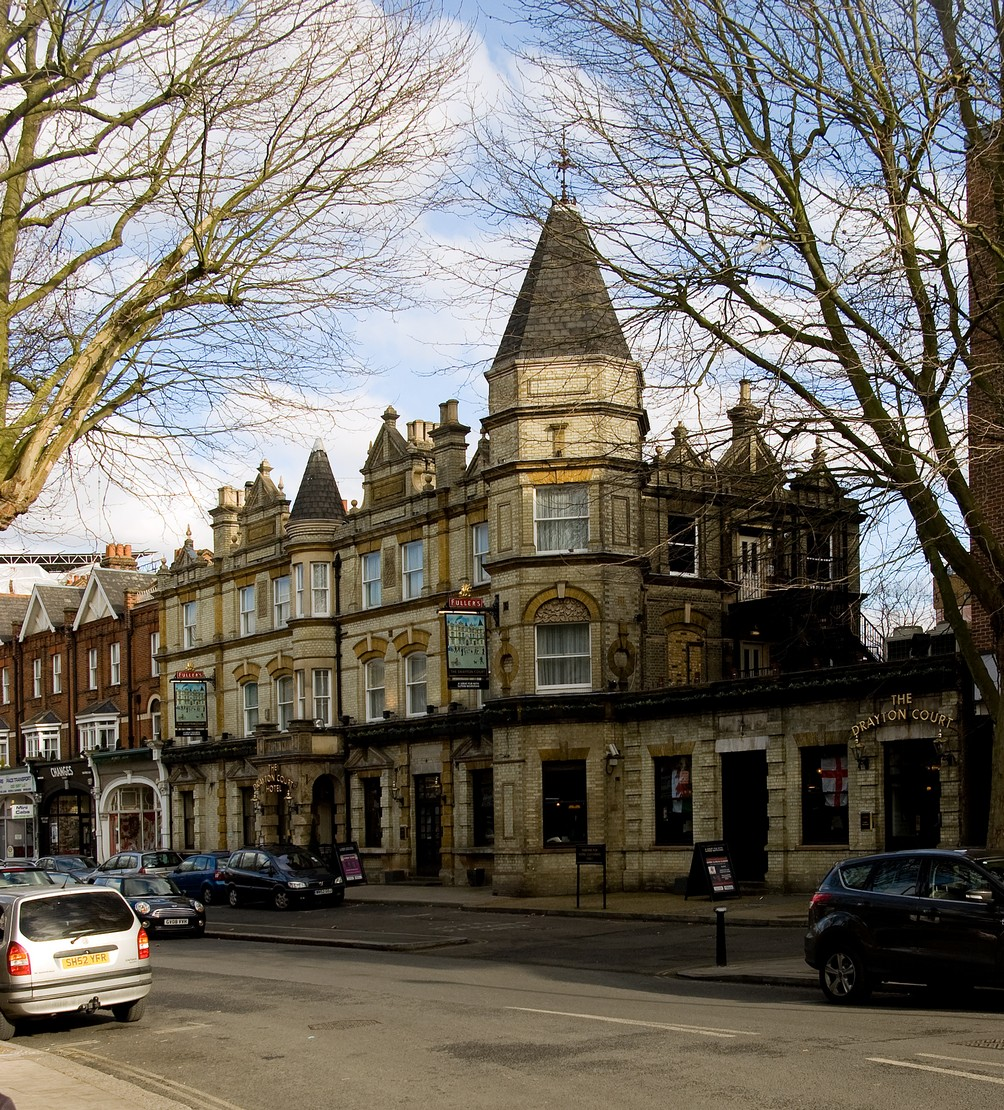
- The Drayton Court

- Location within London Borough of Ealing Location within Greater London

General information
- Location: 2 The Avenue, Ealing, London W13 8PH, London, England
- Coordinates: 51.5142°N 0.3193°W
- Opened: 1894

Website
- draytoncourtlondon.co.uk

The Drayton Court is a boutique hotel and pub in Ealing, west London. The former Vietnamese revolutionary and statesman, Hồ Chí Minh, worked in the kitchens in 1914.

== History ==
The property was designed in 1893 by the Stephens brothers. The pub opened in 1894, and is considered one of the oldest pubs in Ealing.

Hồ Chí Minh, the former Vietnamese revolutionary and statesman, worked in the kitchens of the Drayton Court Hotel in 1914.

When the property opened it had four floors and sixty rooms. Behind the hotel were ornamental gardens, tennis courts, a bowling green and skittle courts. It initially charged residents 25 shillings per week.

The building remained a hotel until the 1940s, when it became one of the area's largest pubs, an off Licence was granted for the sale of beers and spirits to be consumed off the premises. The property also contained a fringe theatre.

At this time the pub had the largest beer garden in London, and in the UK.

In spring 2011, Fuller Smith & Turner acquired the pub and renovated it, restoring part of the property as a 27-room boutique hotel.

== Media ==
The pub has been seen on screen on several occasions, including in the film Carry On Constable and, along with the vintage shop-fronts immediately adjacent, in Survival episode of Doctor Who in 1989.
