= Pitshanger =

Coordinates: 51.526313°N 0.312734°W

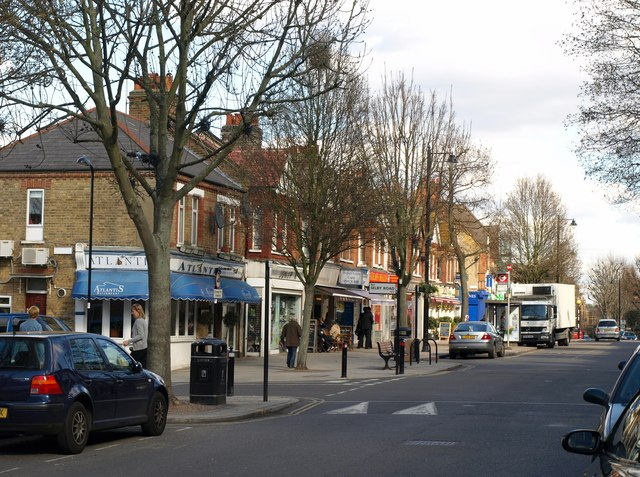
- Pitshanger Lane

- Location within Greater London
- London borough: Ealing
- Ceremonial county: Greater London
- Region: London
- Country: England
- Sovereign state: United Kingdom
- Post town: LONDON
- Postcode district: W5
- Dialling code: 020
- Police: Metropolitan
- Fire: London
- Ambulance: London
- UK Parliament: Ealing North
- London Assembly: Ealing and Hillingdon

Pitshanger (sometimes referred to as Pitshanger Village) is a small but busy local suburb, centred on the shops in Pitshanger Lane, located about 1 mile north of Ealing Broadway in west London. First mentioned in 1493, possibly meaning an area of sloped woodland frequented by birds. It contains numerous small independent shops, several cafes, two pubs, two churches, a school, and a park (Pitshanger Park), and is often taken to also include parts of the nearby Brentham Garden Suburb.

== Amenities ==
Ted Saunders, who was a traditional fishmonger in Pitshanger for over 50 years.

Pitshanger Lane (originally Pitshanger Road) is one of the busiest roads in Ealing, and provides a wide range of shops. The Pitshanger Village Library has recently been improved and the Lane is furnished with touch-screen computers. A Methodist and an Anglican church are both located at the end of the Lane. Due to its large size and possession of a Bösendorfer grand piano, St. Barnabas (Church of England) is the venue for, besides the usual services, a series of classical music concerts given by local musicians and others. These include regular recitals every Friday lunchtime. Attendance is free with a retiring collection. The current vicar of St Barnabas is Father Justin Dodd; the Director of Music is Kavi Pau and the Assistant Director of Music is Henry Tozer who runs a gospel choir. Away from Pitshanger Lane, the Pitshanger area features Pitshanger Park, which includes allotments for locals' use. Featuring two children's playground areas, football goalposts, a bowling green and several tennis courts, Pitshanger Park caters for both children and adults.

Schooling also exists on Pitshanger Lane, with North Ealing Primary School located at one end of the Lane. The school is a comprehensive, co-education school for pupils up to the age of eleven. St. Gregory's R.C. School is also coeducational and located just off Pitshanger Lane.

In May 2016, Pitshanger Lane was named London's best high street by The Great British High Street, and a plaque was unveiled.

== Transport ==
The area is served by buses E2 and E9 and night bus N7.

== Politics ==
Pitshanger is part of the Ealing North constituency for elections to the House of Commons of the United Kingdom.

Pitshanger is part of the Pitshanger ward for elections to Ealing London Borough Council.

== Gallery ==
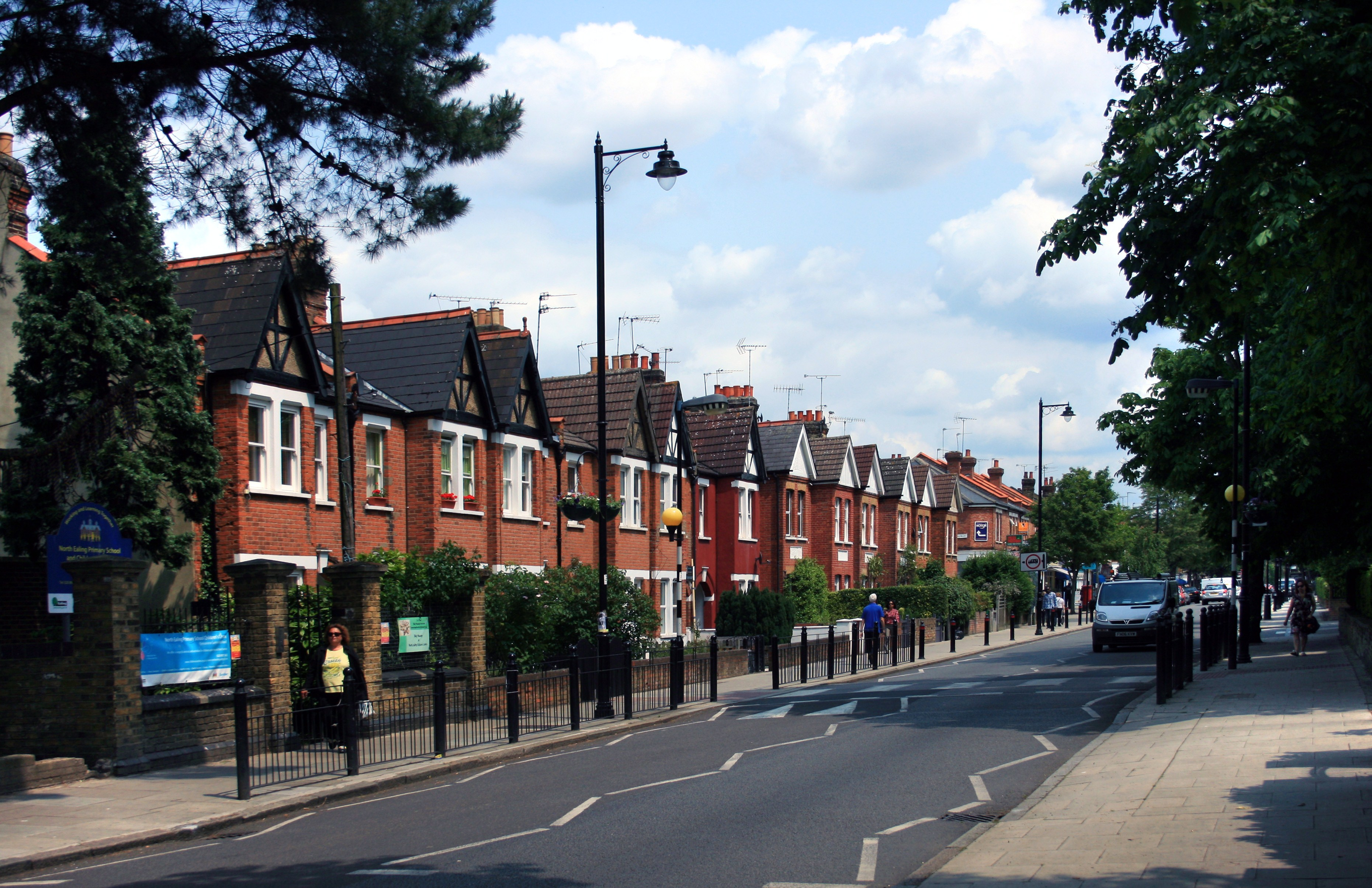
Pitshanger Lane

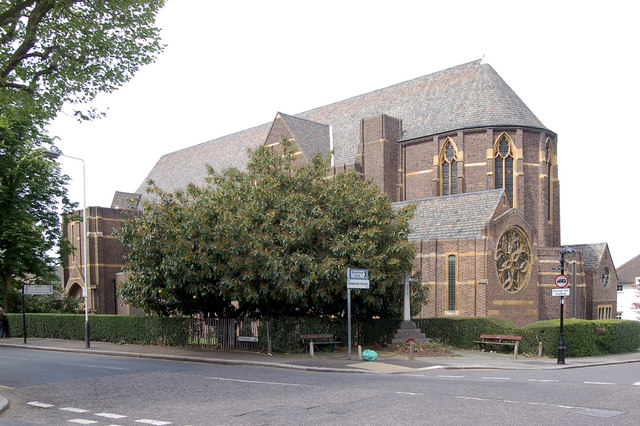
St Barnabas Church

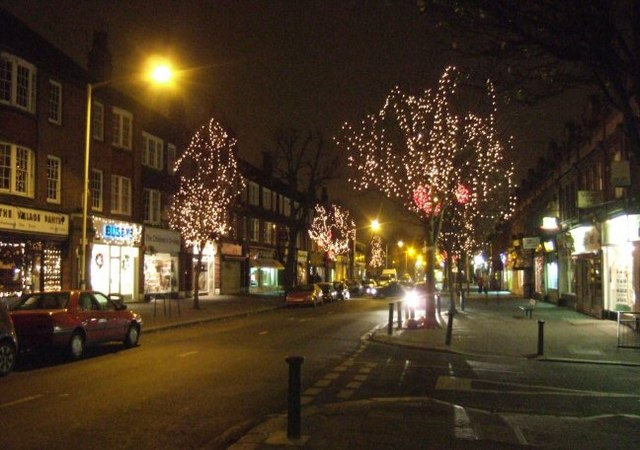
Christmas at Pitshanger Lane

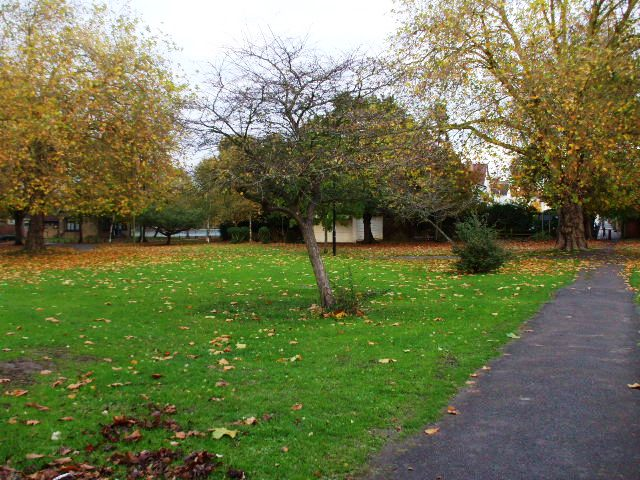
Pitshanger Park
