= List of public art in London =

This is a list of public art in London, including statues, memorials, architectural sculptures and others, divided by London borough and the City of London.

The City of London and the 32 London boroughs
1. City of London; 2. City of Westminster; 3. Kensington and Chelsea; 4. Hammersmith and Fulham; 5. Wandsworth; 6. Lambeth; 7. Southwark; 8. Tower Hamlets; 9. Hackney; 10. Islington; 11. Camden; 12. Brent; 13. Ealing; 14. Hounslow; 15. Richmond; 16. Kingston; 17. Merton	18. Sutton; 19. Croydon; 20. Bromley; 21. Lewisham; 22. Greenwich; 23. Bexley; 24. Havering; 25. Barking and Dagenham; 26. Redbridge; 27. Newham; 28. Waltham Forest; 29. Haringey; 30. Enfield; 31. Barnet; 32. Harrow; 33. Hillingdon
