= List of public art in the London Borough of Ealing =

This is a list of public art in the London Borough of Ealing.

== Acton ==
| Image | Title / subject | Location and coordinates | Date | Artist / designer | Architect / other | Type | Designation | Notes |
|---|---|---|---|---|---|---|---|---|
| | Memorial to James Radclyffe, 3rd Earl of Derwentwater | Acton Park 51°30′32.52″N 0°15′36.55″W | 18th century | ? | ? | Obelisk | Grade II | |
| | Coat of arms of the Goldsmiths' Company | Goldsmiths' Company Alms Houses | 1811 | ? | Charles Beazley | Architectural sculpture | Grade II* | |
| | Fortitude | Corner of East Acton Lane and Green Close | 1931 | Phoebe Stabler | Charles Holloway James | Architectural sculpture | —N/a | Above the former entrance to a building which was originally a YWCA. |
| | Coat of arms of the Municipal Borough of Acton | Over entrance to Acton Old Town Hall, High Street | 1939 | | | | | |
| | Maces and commemoration of George VI | On side of Acton Old Town Hall, High Street | 1940 | | | | | |
| | Saint Aidan | St Aidan of Lindisfarne's Church, Old Oak Common Lane | c. 1961 | Kathleen Parbury | John Newton | Architectural sculpture | —N/a | A copy of the sculptor's 1958 statue of the saint on Lindisfarne, Northumbria. |
| | The Treatment Rooms, mosaic covered house | Fairlawn Grove / Cunnington Street, South Acton 51°29′45.49″N 0°16′0.07″W | 2002 onwards | Carrie Reichardt (The Baroness) | | | | |
| | Big Mother | Charles Hocking House, Bollo Bridge Road, Acton | 2014 | Stik | | | | |
| | The South Acton Tree of Life | Palmerston Road | 2017 | Carrie Reichardt | | Ceramic mural | —N/a | |
| | Owl mural | Charles Hocking House, Bollo Bridge Road, Acton 51°30′5.8″N 0°16′20.81″W | | | | | | |

== Ealing ==
| Image | Title / subject | Location and coordinates | Date | Artist / designer | Architect / other | Type | Designation | Notes |
|---|---|---|---|---|---|---|---|---|
| More images | Stone bench with grotesque mask | Walpole Park 51.5112°N 0.3078°W | Early 19th century | John Soane | —N/a | Bench | Grade II | |
| | Memorial to Charles Jones | Walpole Park, near Pitzhanger Manor | 1914 | Frank Bowcher | | | | |
| More images | Ealing War Memorial | Ealing Green, outside Pitzhanger Manor 51°30′39.55″N 0°18′23.53″W | 1921 | —N/a | Leonard Shuffrey | War memorial screen | Grade II | |
| | Small Workhorse | Oak Road, Ealing | 1985 | Judith Bluck | | Statue | | |
| | Anti-riots mural | Bond Street, Ealing 51°30′45.62″N 0°18′21.9″W | 2011 | Spencer Lowe, W13 arts group, Ealing youth offending service | | | | |
| More images | Ealing Rock | Dickens Yard | 2018 | Gordon Young | —N/a | Sculpture | —N/a | Inscribed with lyrics from George Formby's song "Count Your Blessings and Smile" from the Ealing Studios film Let George Do It! (1940). |
| More images | The Eternal Flame | Ealing Green 51.51158°N 0.30579°W | 2023 | Varaztad Hampartsoumian | —N/a | Sculpture | —N/a | A khachkar in memory of victims of the Armenian genocide. |
| | Family Group | Ealing Broadway Centre 51°30′44.28″N 0°18′11.93″W | | Robert Thomas | | | | |
| | Four caryatids | Atop the columns of the east front of Pitzhanger Manor | | Peter Fink | | | | |

== Greenford and Perivale ==
| Image | Title / subject | Location and coordinates | Date | Artist / designer | Architect / other | Type | Designation | Notes |
|---|---|---|---|---|---|---|---|---|
| | Greenford War Memorial | Ruislip Road, Greenford 51°31′43.05″N 0°21′19.05″W | 1921 | A. J. Campbell-Cooper | —N/a | War memorial cross | Grade II | |
| | Gates with plant designs | Sunley Gardens / Perivale Wood 51°32′19.07″N 0°19′35.11″W | 2010 | Grace & Webb | | Memorial to Roy Hall | | |
| | Gilbert White Weather Vane | Perivale Wood Local Nature Reserve, Sunley Gardens, Perivale, UB6 7PE 51°32′19.07″N 0°19′35.11″W | 2018 | James Eifion Thomas | | | | |

== Hanwell ==
| Image | Title / subject | Location and coordinates | Date | Artist / designer | Architect / other | Type | Designation | Notes |
|---|---|---|---|---|---|---|---|---|
| | Wharncliffe coat of arms | Wharncliffe Viaduct 51°30′39″N 0°20′39″W | 1837 | | | | | |
| | John Conolly Memorial Fountain | Conolly Dell, near Conolly Road 51°30′38.45″N 0°20′26.54″W | c. 1911 | | | | | |
| | Calvary | Church of St Thomas the Apostle, Boston Road | 1933–1934 | Eric Gill | Edward Maufe | Architectural sculpture | Grade II* | |
| More images | King George VI Coronation Clock | Hanwell Broadway 51°30′32.3″N 0°20′17.33″W | 1937 | | | Clock tower | | |
| | Lion and unicorn | At entrance to King George Field, St Mark's Road 51°30′23″N 0°20′19.68″W | 1951 | | | | | |
| | | Elthorne Park 51°29′59.17″N 0°19′59.62″W | | | | | | |
| | Hind | Elthorne Park 51°29′53.04″N 0°19′54.25″W | 2001 | Ray Smith | | | | |
| | Various mosaic sculptures | Elthorne Park 51°29′55.42″N 0°20′1.95″W | | | | | | |

== Northolt ==
| Image | Title / subject | Location and coordinates | Date | Artist / designer | Architect / other | Type | Designation | Notes |
|---|---|---|---|---|---|---|---|---|
| | King George VI Coronation Clock | Northolt Green 51°32′48.72″N 0°22′10.51″W | 1937 | | | | | |
| More images | Northala Fields | Adjacent to A40 Western Avenue | 2008 | Peter Fink | Igor Marko | Land art | —N/a | |
| | Mural | Under A40 51°32′24.32″N 0°21′56.43″W | | | | | | |

== Southall ==
| Image | Title / subject | Location and coordinates | Date | Artist / designer | Architect / other | Type | Designation | Notes |
|---|---|---|---|---|---|---|---|---|
| More images | Southall War Memorial | The Green 51°30′8.81″N 0°22′52.11″W | 1922 | —N/a | James Thomson | War memorial | Grade II | |
| | Mural | Hambrough Primary School 51°30′30.62″N 0°22′37.33″W | 2009 | Bogus the Muralist and children | | | | |
| | Hand sculpture | Western Road 51°30′4.7″N 0°22′59.52″W | | | | | | |
| | Sensational Southall mural | Western Road 51°30′4.7″N 0°22′59.52″W | | Local schoolchildren | | | | |
| | Sculptural Mosaic Globe | Southall Park 51°30′32.2″N 0°22′9.43″W | | Rachel Silver | | | | |

== Bibliography ==
- Lloyd, Fran; Potkin, Helen; Thackara, Davina (2011). Public Sculpture of Outer South and West London. Public Sculpture of Britain. Liverpool: Liverpool University Press.
