= Harold Pendleton =

British music business executive

- Born: July 17, 1924; Southport, Lancashire, United Kingdom
- Died: September 22, 2017 (aged 93)
- Occupation: Music business executive
- Known for: Founder of the Marquee Club and the National Jazz Festival
- Spouse: Barbara Pendleton

Harold Pendleton (17 July 1924 – 22 September 2017) was a British music business executive and former club owner, who established the Marquee Club in London and the National Jazz Festival, the precursor of the Reading Rock Festival.

== Early life ==
Born in Southport, Lancashire, Pendleton trained as an accountant and moved to London in 1948. He had a love of traditional jazz music, and when visiting clubs became friendly with Chris Barber, who had set up the National Federation of Jazz Organisations of Great Britain (NFJOGB). Pendleton became the organisation's secretary, shortening its name to the National Jazz Federation (NJF), and began organising events highlighting British jazz musicians.

== Career ==
By 1957 the National Jazz Federation was promoting 200 concerts a year, but lacked a regular venue. He also encouraged Barber's banjo player Lonnie Donegan to record Lead Belly's song "Rock Island Line", so stimulating the 1950s skiffle craze.

In 1958, Pendleton took over the jazz nights held in the Marquee Ballroom in Oxford Street, expanding their programme and frequency and occasionally inviting American musicians, including Muddy Waters, to perform there. After Pendleton saw how successful blues music had become at the Ealing Club, the Marquee began hosting rhythm and blues nights in 1962, and featured the Rolling Stones despite Pendleton's personal dislike of their music. Throughout the 1960s and 1970s, the club, and its attached recording studio, became one of the leading venues for R&B and rock music in Britain.

As Secretary of the NJF, and after being involved in earlier jazz festivals at Beaulieu, Pendleton set up the first National Jazz Festival in 1961. Over time, the event expanded to include not only jazz but also blues, rhythm and blues, and rock music, before becoming known as the Reading Festival.

== Later life ==
In 1987 Pendleton sold the Marquee Club to Billy Gaff, and he retired from his role at the Reading Festival in 1988. Before that, in 1979, he and his wife Barbara became partners with a lighting and sound equipment company, Entec Sound & Light, which had been established by Pat Chapman in 1968 to provide services for rock and pop bands, clubs and festivals.

Pendleton died in 2017, aged 93, after a short illness.
