= National Jazz and Blues Festival =

Music festival in England

National Jazz, Blues & Rock Festival
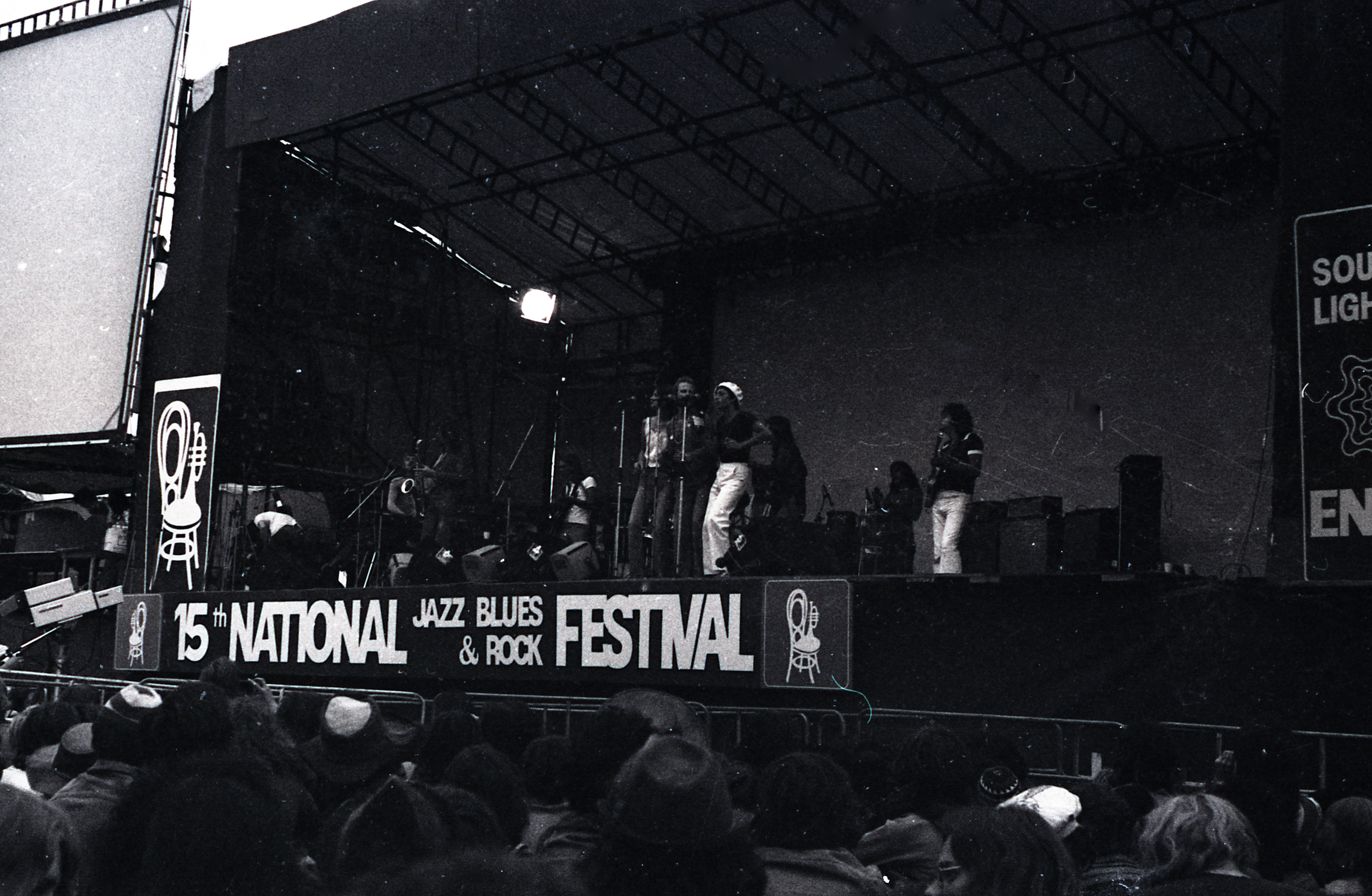
- The 15th National Jazz, Blues and Rock Festival held at Reading in 1975
- Genre: Jazz, blues, etc.
- Locations: Richmond Athletic Ground, London Borough of Richmond upon Thames
- Years active: 1961– 1980s
- Founders: Harold Pendleton

The National Jazz and Blues Festival was the English precursor to the Reading and Leeds Festivals and was the brainchild of Harold Pendleton, the founder of the prestigious Marquee Club in Soho.

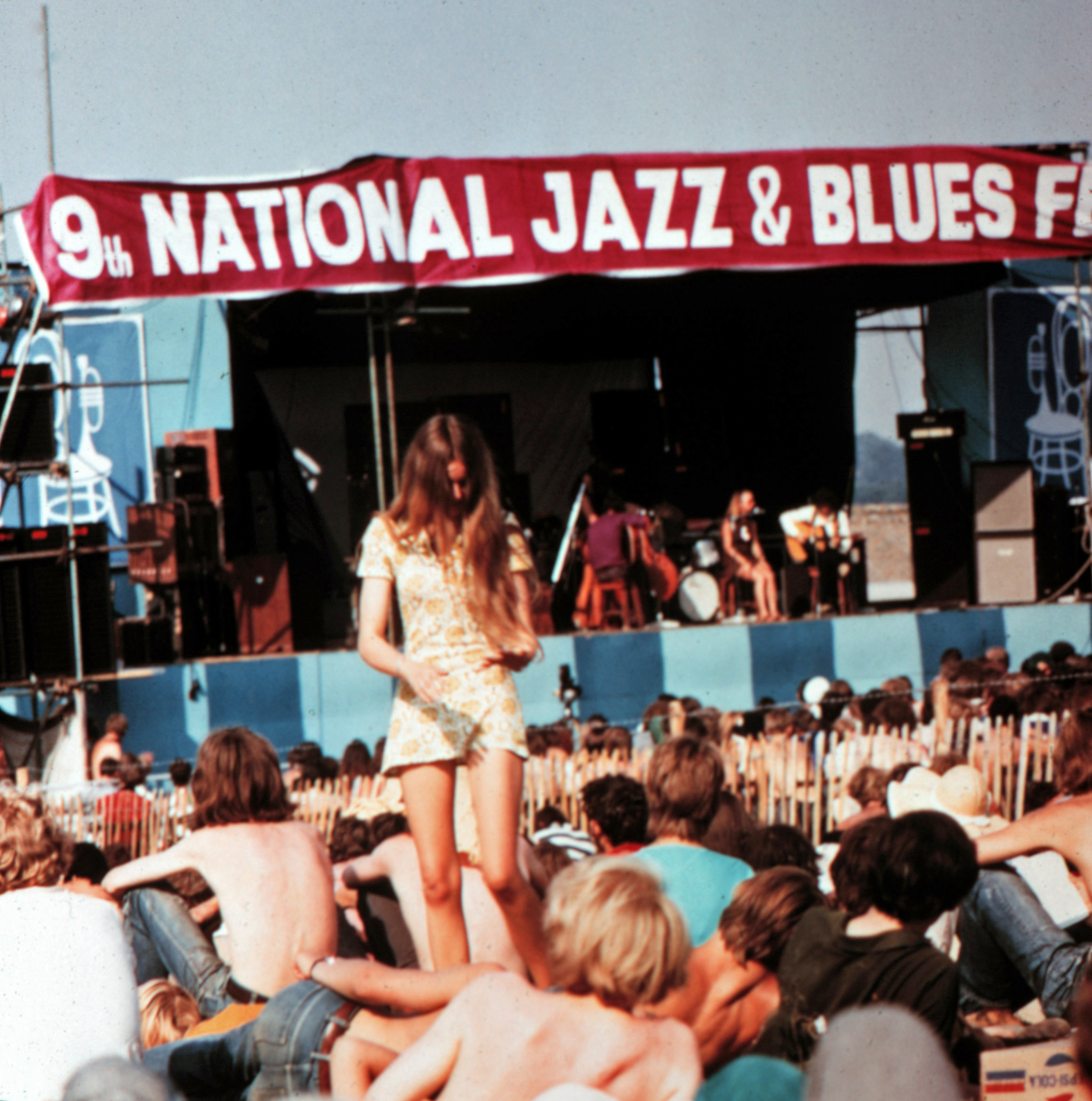
The 9th National Jazz & Blues Festival held at Plumpton in 1969

Initially called The National Jazz Festival, it was a showcase for British and US jazz and was held at Richmond Athletic Ground in the sedate London suburb of Richmond. The first festival took place on 26-27 August 1961, and the headline acts included Johnny Dankworth and Chris Barber. Inspiration for the event came from the Newport Jazz Festival, held in the US since 1954.

In 1964 the festival changed its name to "The National Jazz and Blues Festival", which reflected the change in musical tastes occurring in Britain in the early 1960s. Gradually the jazz component of the festival was whittled away and by 1967, the festival was featuring the likes of Cream, Fleetwood Mac and Jeff Beck, whilst the jazz groups were relegated to an afternoon session.

== See also ==
- List of historic rock festivals
- List of blues festivals
- List of jazz festivals
- Reading and Leeds Festivals
