= Ealing Jazz Club =

Music venue in London, England

Coordinates: 51°30′52″N 0°18′9″W

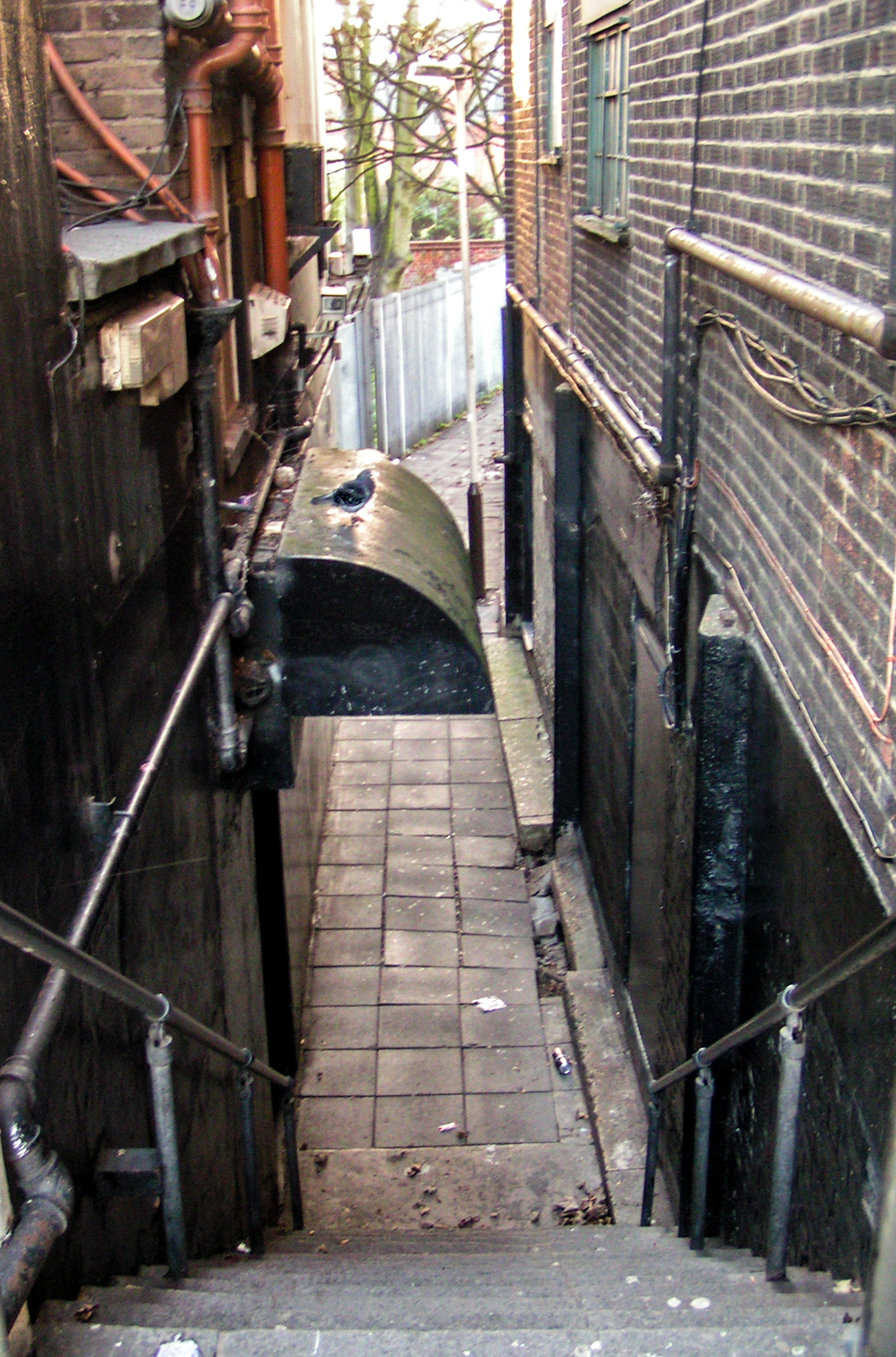
Entrance to the Ealing Club

Ealing Jazz Club was a music venue in Ealing, west London, England, which opened in 1959. It became London's first regular blues venue, with performances by the Alexis Korner and Cyril Davies band Blues Incorporated. Now commonly referred to as the Ealing Blues Club, the venue is now a nightclub called The Red Room.

== History ==
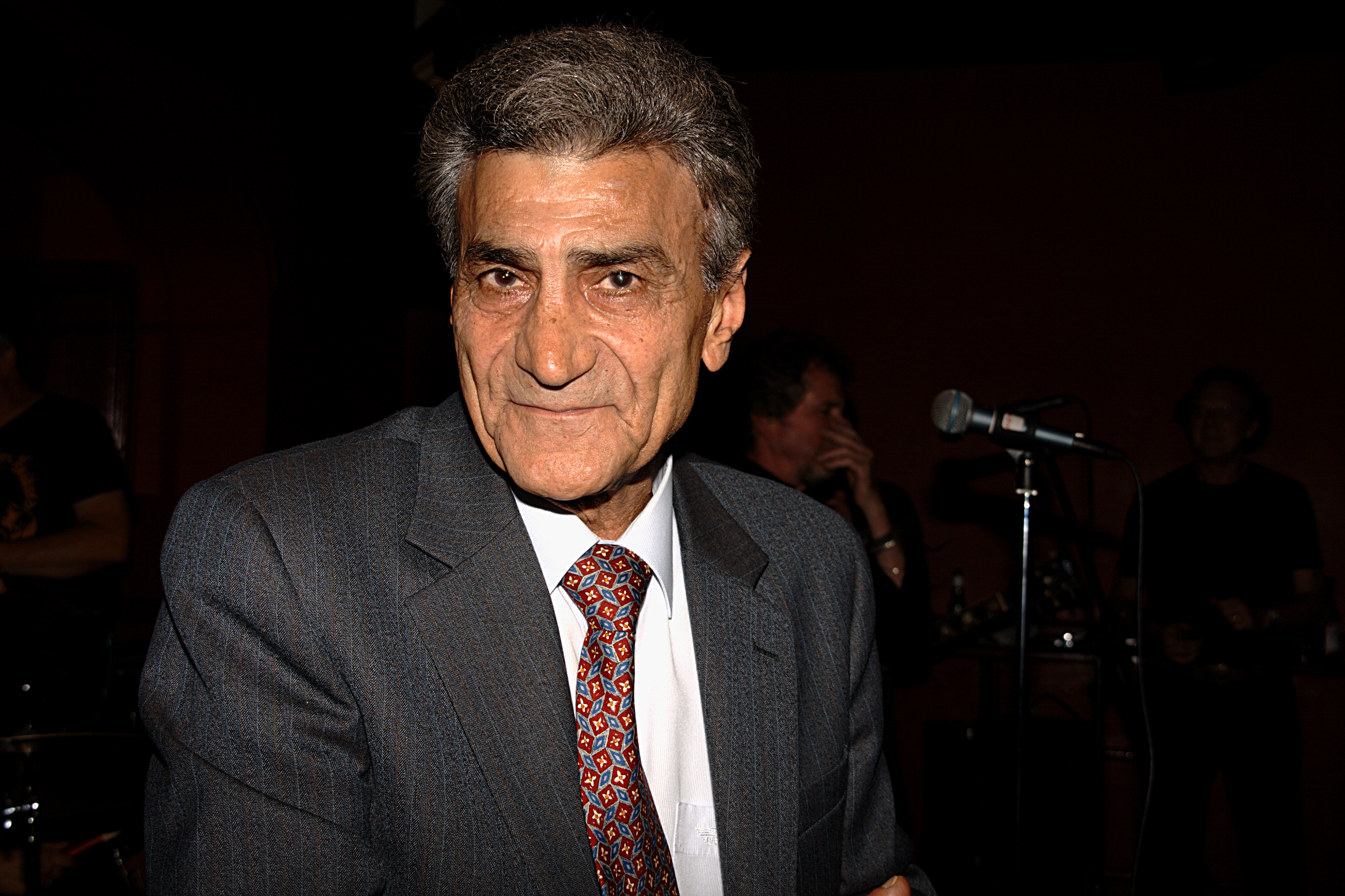
Fery Asgari, the manager of the Ealing Club

Ealing Jazz Club opened at 42A The Broadway, Ealing, in January 1959. The manager was Teheran-born student Fery Asgari who ran the venue for fellow students of Ealing Technical College. Asgari had been using Ealing Town Hall, then the upstairs ballroom of The Feathers, a pub opposite the Ealing Club, before taking on the premises, where he ran jazz nights on Thursdays and Fridays, and R&B on Saturdays.

In a basement opposite Ealing Broadway station, it is reached by descending the narrow steps of the alley that leads to Haven Place. Korner and Davies moved their blues club at the Roundhouse pub in Wardour Street, the London Blues and Barrelhouse Club, to Ealing on 17 March 1962 after it was ejected for going electric. The Ealing venue had been suggested to them by Blues Incorporated singer Art Wood.

Korner recalled: "The club held only 200 when you packed them all in. There were only about 100 people in all of London that were into the blues and all of them showed up at the club that first night".

The club is noteworthy as the place where, on 24 March 1962, Charlie Watts first met Brian Jones then, on 7 April 1962 Alexis Korner introduced Mick Jagger and Keith Richards to Brian Jones, and the nucleus of the Rolling Stones first came together.

And it was where, nearly a year later, the classic line-up of the Rolling Stones, with Charlie Watts on drums played for the first time in public, on 12 January 1963. However, it was not until an Ealing gig on 2 February 1963 that Watts became the Stones' permanent drummer.

Eric Clapton has recalled that occasionally he stood in for Mick Jagger at the club when the novice Rolling Stones singer had a sore throat.

The regular musicians at the Saturday night blues sessions during 1962-65 included Jack Bruce, Ginger Baker, Eric Clapton, Charlie Watts, Graham Bond, Long John Baldry, Rod Stewart, Malcolm Cecil, Dick Taylor, Dick Heckstall-Smith and Paul Jones. Manfred Mann (originally the Mann-Hugg Blues Brothers) also played there. The Who appeared there early on in their career (when they were known as the Detours), like James Royal (who was born in Ealing). Eric Burdon, lead singer of the Animals and John McLaughlin also frequented the club.

Burdon has written about hitchhiking to London from Newcastle upon Tyne to visit the Ealing Club, where he and 'tall, skinny, short-haired schoolboy' Mick Jagger were picked out of the crowd by Korner to sing together.

The future TONTO's Expanding Head Band synthesizer pioneer and Stevie Wonder producer Malcolm Cecil who played double bass with Blues Incorporated recalled: "A young Mick Jagger would sit in sometimes when we played at the blues club in Ealing. On one memorable occasion, Mick asked Cyril if he could bend notes on guitar and Cyril quipped If you gimme some pliers, man."

After a visit to the Ealing Club, Harold Pendleton owner of the then-struggling Marquee Club switched its programming from jazz to R&B when he hired Korner's band for a weekly Thursday night residency in 1962.

Another early visitor to the club was John Mansfield who decided to set up the Ricky-Tick club in Windsor as a blues venue.

The Ealing Club also played a part in the sound of rock. A Sunday night in 1963 saw the first public performance ever to use the classic 'loud' Marshall JTM45 guitar amplifier. The band assembled to test a pre-production version of the amp included future Jimi Hendrix Experience drummer Mitch Mitchell—who worked in the Marshall shop in Hanwell—and saxophonist Terry Marshall, the 'T' in 'JTM'.

== Legacy ==
Since then, the venue has been operated as the Broadway Casino Club as well as a disco under various names including Tabby's, The Nutmeg, Chequers, Madocs and Club Azur. These days, as the Red Room, the premises consist of two small bars a dance floor/performance space and a seating area that occupies the space where the stage was in the 1960s.

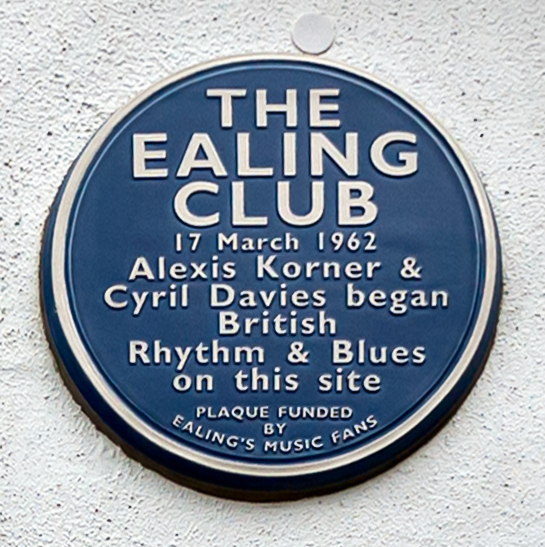
Blue Plaque, unveiled 17 March 2012

In 2011, a community group of Ealing residents, musicians and music fans known as The Ealing Club initiated a campaign to bring back live music to the venue and highlight its important contribution to the development of British blues and rock. The group's first three events were held on the nights of 18–20 July 2011, with proceeds going towards the installation of the blue plaque unveiled on 17 March 2012.

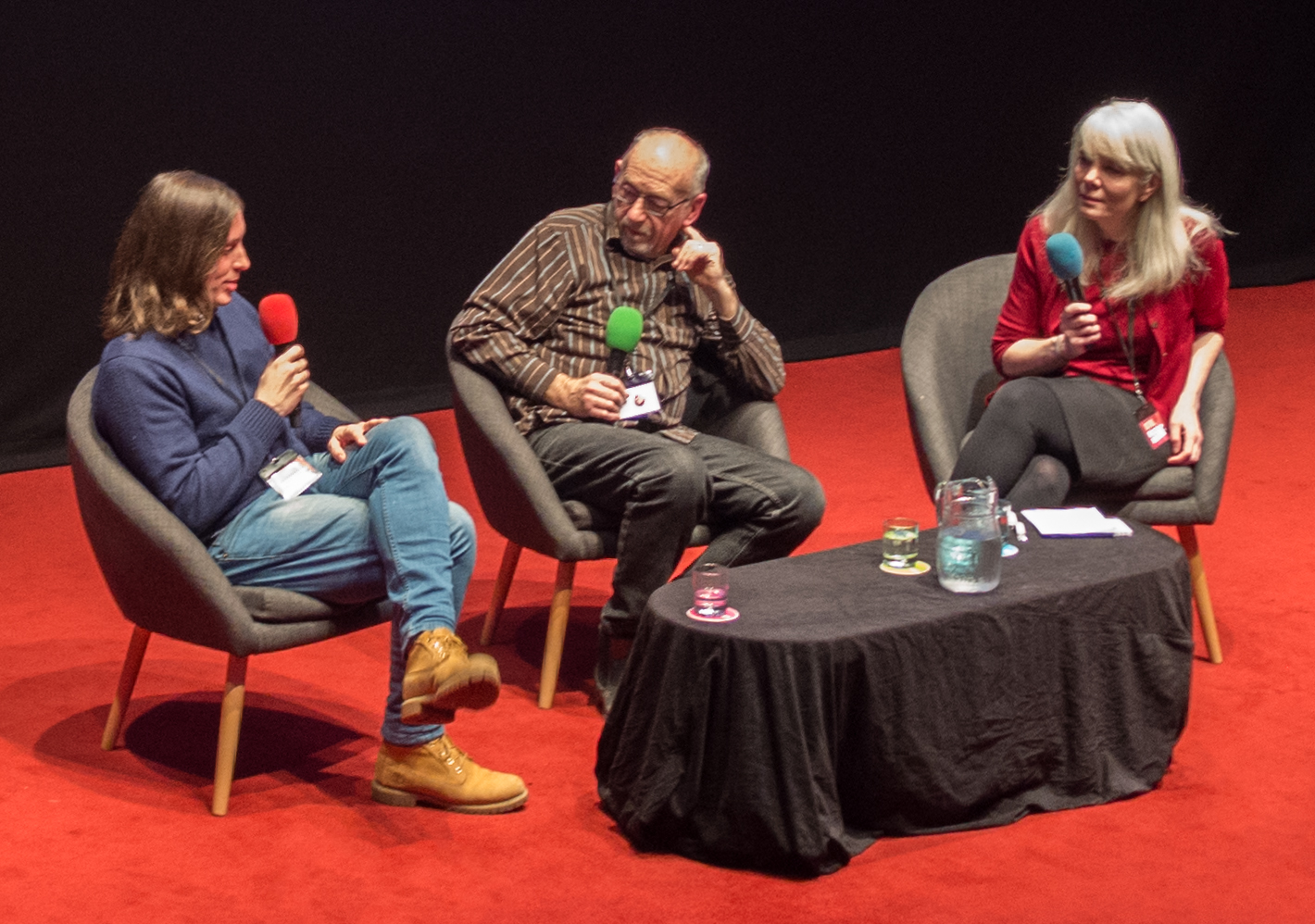
Pictured at the Q&A after the premiere of Suburban Steps To Rockland: The Story of The Ealing Club on 4 November 2017 are (l-r) the film's director Giorgio Guernier; guitarist Dick Taylor, founding member of the Rolling Stones and the Pretty Things; and Q&A host Karen Shook.

Suburban Steps to Rockland, a feature film documentary about the story of the club, premiered at the Doc'n Roll Film Festival on 4 November 2017 at the Barbican Centre. The film includes interviews with many of those who played there including Jack Bruce, Ginger Baker, Don Craine, Eric Burdon, Paul Jones, Terry Marshall, John Mayall and Dick Taylor, as well as club manager Fery Asgari. In 2019 Sky UK acquired broadcast rights to the film, which received its first screening on 8 September.

The nearest rail and tube station to the club is Ealing Broadway.

== See also ==
- Ealing Jazz Festival
- List of jazz clubs
