= List of public art in the London Borough of Bexley =

This is a list of public art in the London Borough of Bexley.

== Belvedere ==
Image	Title / subject	Location and coordinates	Date	Artist / designer	Type	Material	Dimensions	Designation	Notes
More images	The Cob	Roundabout at junction of Bronze Age Way and Picardy Manorway 51.4972°N 0.1580°E	2011	Andy Scott	Sculpture	Galvanised steel	6 metres (20 ft) high	—N/a	

== Bexley ==
Image	Title / subject	Location and coordinates	Date	Artist / designer	Type	Designation	Notes
More images	Bexley War Memorial	Junction of Hurst Road and Parkhill Road	1920	Reginald Blomfield	Memorial cross	—N/a	Unveiled 14 November 1920.

== Bexleyheath ==
Image	Title / subject	Location and coordinates	Date	Artist / designer	Type	Designation	Notes
	Pincott Obelisk	Outside Christ Church 51.4573°N 0.1408°E	1879	Unknown	Drinking fountain	—N/a	Memorial for the Reverend William Henry Pincott
	Bexleyheath War Memorial	Steeple Gardens, Oaklands Road	1921	?	Obelisk	—N/a	
	Family Outing	West entrance to Broadway Shopping Centre 51.4562°N 0.1443°E	1985	John Ravera	Sculpture	—N/a	

== Crayford ==
Image	Title / subject	Location and coordinates	Date	Artist / designer	Type	Designation	Notes
More images	Crayford War Memorial	Grounds of Crayford Manor, Mayplace Road East 51.4583°N 0.1720°E	1954	?	Wall with plaques	Grade II	
	The Worrier	Crayford Waterside	2000	Unknown	Sculpture	—N/a	A play on Rodin's The Thinker
	Madder Roots	Bourne Road 51.4523°N 0.1715°E	2011	Mor	Sculpture	—N/a	References the invention of a method to fix madder root dyes using cow dung by the local David Evans company
	John Alcock and Arthur Whitten Brown	Town Hall, Crayford Road 51.4505°N 0.1808°E	2019	Tony Stallard	Sculptures	—N/a	Installed to mark the centenary of their first non-stop transatlantic flight

== Erith ==
Image	Title / subject	Location and coordinates	Date	Artist / designer	Type	Material	Dimensions	Designation	Notes
More images	War memorial	Christ Church, Victoria Road 51.4799°N 0.1764°E	After 1918	?	Memorial cross	Marble		Grade II	
More images	De Luci Pike / De Luci Fish	Erith Roundabout 51.4805°N 0.1773°E	2004	Gary Drostle	Sculpture	Mosaic			
	Earth Core Columns		2004	Gary Drostle and Onya McCausland	Sculptures	Metal and Glass Smalti Mosaic			
	Atrium Water Court Sculpture		2004	Sokari Douglas Camp	Sculpture	Metal			
	Stone Court Mosaic	adjacent to the Cross Keys public house	2004	Gary Drostle	Mosaic	Porcelain Mosaic			
	White Hart Thames Barge Mural		2004	Gary Drostle	Mural	Artists Acrylic Paint			
	Riverside Shopping Centre Gates	Riverside Shopping Centre	2004	Onya McCausland	Gates				

== Lesnes Abbey Woods ==
Image	Title / subject	Location and coordinates	Date	Artist / designer	Type	Material	Designation	Notes
	Monk	Lesnes Abbey Woods 51.4886°N 0.1263°E		Tom Harvey	Sculpture	Wood	—N/a	
	Lady of the Woods	Lesnes Abbey Woods 51.4869°N 0.1292°E	2016	Tom Harvey	Sculpture	Wood	—N/a	
	The Green Man	Lesnes Abbey Woods 51.4884°N 0.1324°E		Tom Harvey	Sculpture	Wood	—N/a	
	Coryphodon	Fossil Pit, Lesnes Abbey Woods 51.4873°N 0.1307°E		Tom Harvey	Sculpture	Wood	—N/a	
	Owl	Lesnes Abbey Woods 51.4842°N 0.1245°E		Tom Harvey	Sculpture	Wood	—N/a	
	Lesnes Abbey Mosaic	Lesnes Abbey 51.4893°N 0.1283°E		Gary Drostle	Mosaic		—N/a	
	Data Tree	Lesnes Abbey Woods 51.4859°N 0.1295°E	2021	Jonathan Wright	Sculpture		—N/a	"Conceptual way marker" placed on top of a remaining tree trunk

== North Cray ==
Image	Title / subject	Location and coordinates	Date	Artist / designer	Type	Designation	Notes
More images	North Cray War Memorial	St James's churchyard 51.4254°N 0.1335°E	1920	?	Celtic cross	Grade II	

== Sidcup ==
Image	Title / subject	Location and coordinates	Date	Artist / designer	Type	Designation	Notes
More images	Sidcup War Memorial	The Green 51.4235°N 0.1015°E	After 1918	?	Cenotaph	—N/a	
