= Ealing Jazz Festival =

Annual jazz festival in London, England

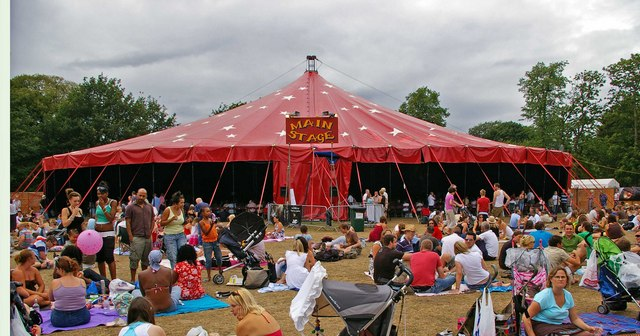
- The main stage marquee in 2006
- Genre: Jazz
- Dates: 1984 to date
- Location: Walpole Park
- Years active: 32
- Founders: Albert 'Bev' Bowles-Bevan, Dick Esmond
- Organizer: Ealing London Borough Council
- Website: Ealing Jazz Festival

Ealing Jazz Festival is an annual Summer jazz festival in Ealing's Walpole Park in London, United Kingdom. It was first held in 1984.

In 2016, concern was raised after Ealing Council announced it was to take over management of the festival from "The Event Umbrella". As a result, the festival programme was reduced from five to two days of live music and ticket prices increased sharply. These unpopular measures were intended to reduce financial risk. A group of protesters staged a demonstration outside Ealing Council's offices to publicise their objections.

== See also ==
- Ealing Jazz Club
