= Pitzhanger Manor =

English country house

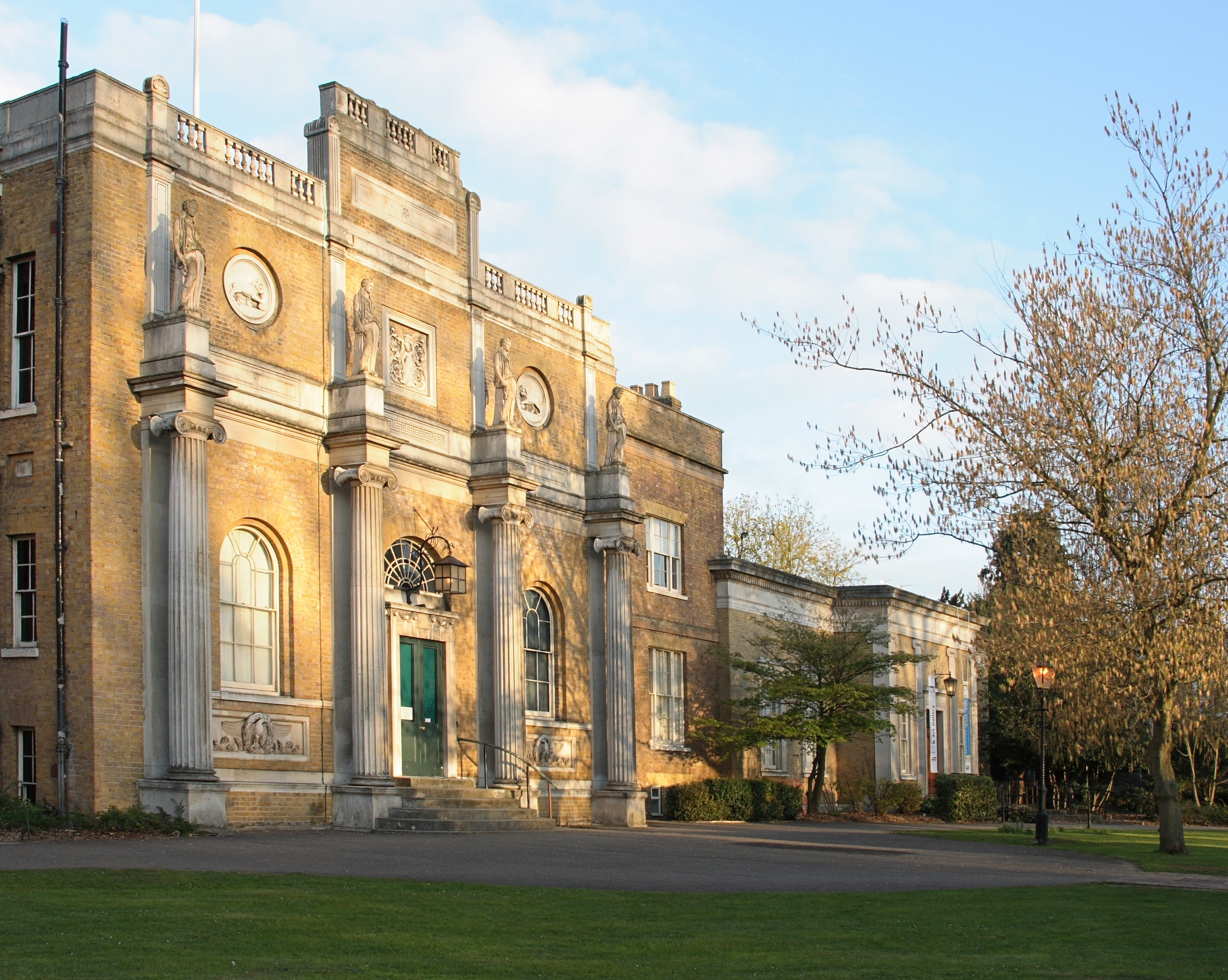
- Pitzhanger Manor, east façade (before 2019 restoration)

- Location within London Borough of Ealing
- Location: Mattock Lane, Ealing, London, W5 5EQ, United Kingdom
- Coordinates: 51°30′39.95″N 00°18′26.02″W
- Director: Clare Gough
- Architect: Sir John Soane
- Public transit access: Ealing Broadway; South Ealing; 65, 207, 427, 607, E1, E11, 112, E2, E7, E8, E9, E10, 483, 226, 297.
- Website: www.pitzhanger.org.uk

Listed Building – Grade I
- Official name: Pitzhanger Manor (Public Library)
- Designated: 24 February 1950
- Reference no.: 1358808

Pitzhanger Manor is an English country house famous as the home of neoclassical architect, Sir John Soane. Built between 1800 and 1804 in what is now Walpole Park Ealing, to the west of London, the Regency Manor is a rare and spectacular example of a building designed, built and lived in by Sir John Soane himself. Soane intended it as a domestic space to entertain guests in, as well as a family home for a dynasty of architects, starting with his sons.

Pitzhanger Manor and Gallery was established as a heritage attraction in 1987, later showing contemporary art exhibitions from 1996. In 2015, the Pitzhanger closed for a major conservation project to restore the Grade I listed building to Soane’s original designs, and upgrade the contemporary Gallery. The three-year project was led by Ealing Council, in collaboration with Pitzhanger Manor & Gallery Trust and with the aid of the National Lottery Heritage Fund. On 16 March 2019 Pitzhanger Manor & Gallery re-opened, revealing Soane’s original design for the first time in over 175 years.

== History ==
=== Before 1800 ===
A large house has stood on the site at least since the late seventeenth century, at which time the smaller Pitzhanger Manor (variously spelled) stood a mile or so to its north.

Between 1664 and 1674, a Richard Slaney paid Hearth Tax on a building on the site of the present-day Pitzhanger Manor for 16 hearths. This account provides a rough indication of the considerable size of the property.

In 1711, the building's occupants John and Mary Wilmer gave away their eldest daughter Grizell Wilmer (1692–1756) to be married to Johnathan Gurnell (1684–1753). (Samuel Hoare Jr was a grandson of this union.) He went on to make his fortune, first as a merchant and later as a co-founder of the city bank Gurnell, Hoare, and Harman. It was through this marriage that the house then passed to his only surviving son Thomas Gurnell, who bought Pits Hanger Manor Farm (sometimes spelt Pitts Hanger on old maps) in 1765. With the plainer 'manor house' of Pits Hanger (Farm) Manor standing near the centre of the modern Meadvale Road in the present suburb of Pitshanger (often referred to locally as Pitshanger Village), his grander existing house, a mile to the south in Ealing, became known as Pitshanger Place.

In 1768, George Dance the Younger was commissioned to build an extension, on which a young John Soane, later to become one of Britain’s most influential architects, had one of his first architectural apprenticeships.

Upon the death of Thomas Gurnell, his son Johnathan II inherited the house. On his death in 1791, ownership passed to his young daughter (but was held in trust). The house was let out until 1799 when the trustees decided to sell it.

=== Sir John Soane (1800–1810) ===
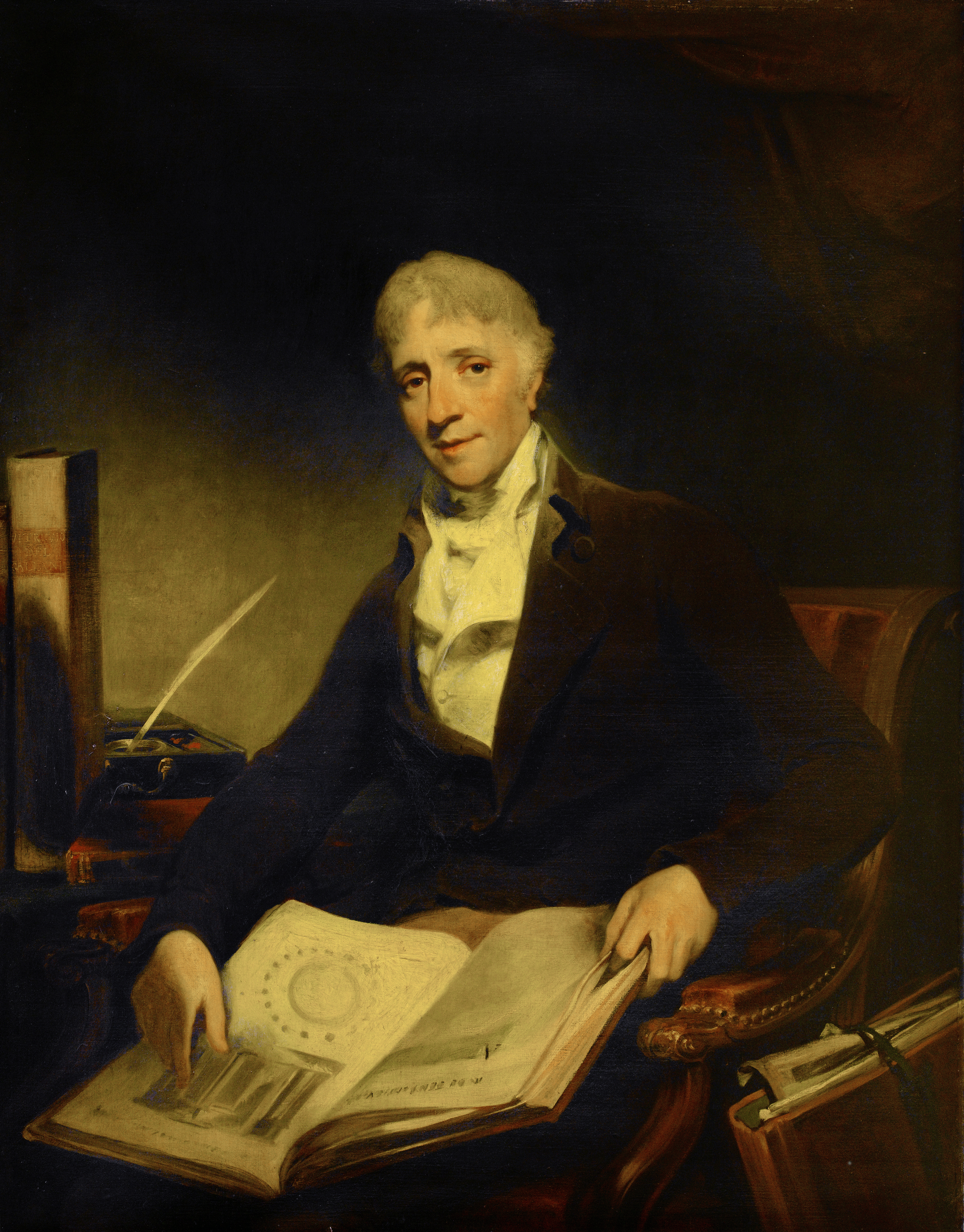
William Owen's Portrait of John Soane (1804)

By the 1790s, John Soane had a successful architectural practice in London, holding the post of architect to the Bank of England. In 1794 Soane, his wife Eliza and their two young sons moved into 12 Lincoln's Inn Fields (now part of the Sir John Soane's Museum) in central London, which doubled as an architecture office for him and his staff.

In early 1800, Soane decided to acquire a family country home to the west of London. Soane intended it as a country villa for entertaining guests, to showcase his skills as an architect and his collection of art and antiquities, and eventually for passing down to his elder son. Though he initially planned to have the house purpose built, he saw potential in Pitzhanger, likely due to his work there during his bricklayer apprenticeship. On 21 July 1800 he visited Pitzhanger, which he had heard was available, and offered the trustees £4,500 for the whole estate of 28 acres (110,000 m^{2}); it was accepted on 1 August.

Soane worked vigorously on the designs of the new house, and over a hundred drawings for it are held by Soane's Museum. He planned for the demolition of the older part of the house and many of the outbuildings; however, he retained the two-storey south wing designed by George Dance. Soane had worked on this element of Pitzhanger as an apprentice for Dance, and admired its elegant interiors. Demolition began in 1800, keeping its original position in what is now Walpole Park. Most of Soane's radical rebuilding was complete by late 1803.

Fully completed in 1804, the central section of the house displays many typical Soane features: quartered and canopy dome ceilings, inset mirrors, and wooden panelling. Soane continued the building to the east with mock Roman ruins and a kitchen block (perhaps an adaptation of existing buildings). The buildings in this eastern part of the site were demolished in or around 1901. The building's shares many architectural features with his main London home at Lincoln's Inn Fields. Much of Soane’s collection of paintings and classical antiquities now at the Soane Museum were bought for and originally housed in Pitzhanger Manor.

Soane sold the house in 1810: his wife Eliza was unhappy in the country and he had fallen out with his two sons, John and George. His intention for Pitzhanger as the seat of his architectural dynasty was unsuccessful, and so Pitzhanger passed through several owners until in 1843 it became home to the daughters of Spencer Perceval, a former UK Prime Minister.

Since Soane's time, the house has been referred to variously as The Manor, or Pitshanger Manor, but has now formally reverted to the name given to it by Soane, spelt with a Z. Pitshanger Village and Lane remained spelt with an S.

=== Ealing Council (1900–1985) ===
In 1900, the house was acquired by Ealing Urban District Council in the year before it became a Municipal Borough for a total of £40,000, a quarter of which came from the Middlesex County Council. Its new function was to serve as a free public library. However, work on converting the building did not start until after the death of its last resident, Frederika Perceval, in May 1901.

An element of the restoration work was to build a ground-floor extension with a pitched slate roof, on the west of the Eating Room. However, this room was all that remained of George Dance's original design. The council had its chief surveyor Charles Jones design an extension next to the existing Breakfast Room. As Dance designed the Eating Room windows with a tall aspect, topped by semi-circular bonded gauge brick arches, the glazing and frames were removed to create three large arched pedestrian openings into the newly created extension. To avoid a clash of architectural styles, Jones specified that the new extension be an almost mirror image of its neighbour, clearly visible through the connecting arches.

On the north side of the house, Jones had the servants' quarters demolished and removed some ornamental faux Roman ruins. The building to house the new Lending Library was constructed on the space so cleared. To complement the rest of the house it had the same arched windows. The lintel of the Portland stone surround of the portico was inscribed 'Lending Library'. It was opened to the public in April 1902.

In 1938–40, the Lending Library block was replaced by a new, slightly larger building, which stands today as Pitzhanger Gallery.

The Library moved out in 1984 and in 1985 the first round of restoration work began.

=== PM Gallery & House (1987–2012) ===
The partially restored house opened to the public once again in January 1987 as the London Borough of Ealing's main museum. In 1996, it began showing exhibitions of contemporary art, in the 1939 extension to the House and within the House itself. It later became known as PM Gallery & House. From the mid-2000s, a comprehensive education programme underpinned the exhibitions and served the widest possible range of audiences, from Ealing and further afield. The venue also became a popular setting for weddings and events. Planning began in 2008 for a second round of restoration project to bring Pitzhanger closer to Soane's intended design, and closed for the major conservation project in March 2015.

=== Restoration (2012–2019) ===
In 2012, Ealing Council launched a major project to restore and conserve Pitzhanger Manor and the adjacent Gallery. Pitzhanger Manor was awarded a first-round development grant of £275,000 from the Heritage Lottery Fund (HLF), and was working with the Pitzhanger Manor & Gallery Trust and the Heritage Lottery Fund on plans to restore the house.

The project aimed to restore Pitzhanger Manor to Sir John Soane’s architectural vision, revealing the building's rich history. In addition the building was made fully accessible, a contemporary café restaurant was built on the site of Soane’s kitchen garden, and the Gallery was upgraded to include a Grade-A space with environmental controls to allow for major loans.

The plans included removing the 1901 Eating Room extension and the Victorian extension which connected the Manor and Gallery. In line with Soane’s plans for Pitzhanger, the rear single-storey conservatory, which was demolished by 1910, was rebuilt, and the large roof light was reinstated.

Architects Jestico + Whiles were appointed as lead architects on the project, working alongside heritage specialists Julian Harrap Architects. They were supported by a large team of specialist contractors, led by Quinn London Ltd. Jestico + Whiles additionally designed a new café-restaurant in the walled garden and a new educational centre by the existing play-park.

=== Pitzhanger Manor & Gallery (2019–present) ===
On 16 March 2019, Pitzhanger Manor & Gallery reopened to the public after the completion of its extension restoration work. The project had successfully returned much of the Manor to Soane’s original design, as well as upgraded the adjacent Gallery. It now displays three exhibitions a year of artwork by contemporary artists, designers and architects to provide a new perspective on the work of Sir John Soane.

Alongside the extensive conservation, the new learning centre, The Rickyard, opened in 2015, is run by Ealing Council and often hosts Pitzhanger events and workshops.

An independent charity has been established called Pitzhanger Manor & Gallery Trust, formed in 2012 by Ealing Council to oversee the restoration project. Chaired by Sir Sherard Cowper-Coles alongside thirteen trustees, the trust raised funds for Pitzhanger's restoration. After its March re-opening, the trust took on the running of the site as a public visitor attraction.

Views of Pitzhanger
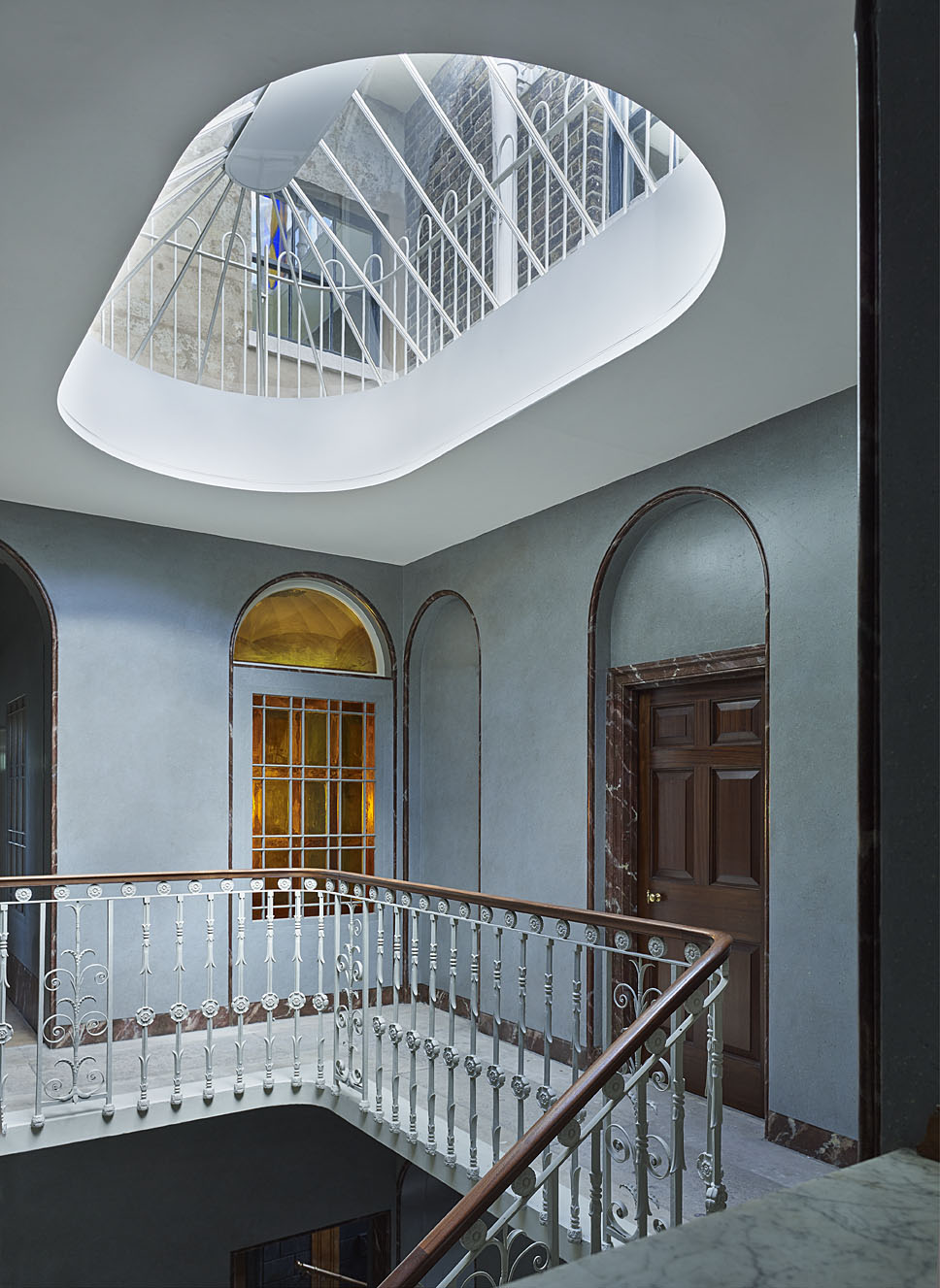
The Upper Landing of the historic Manor.

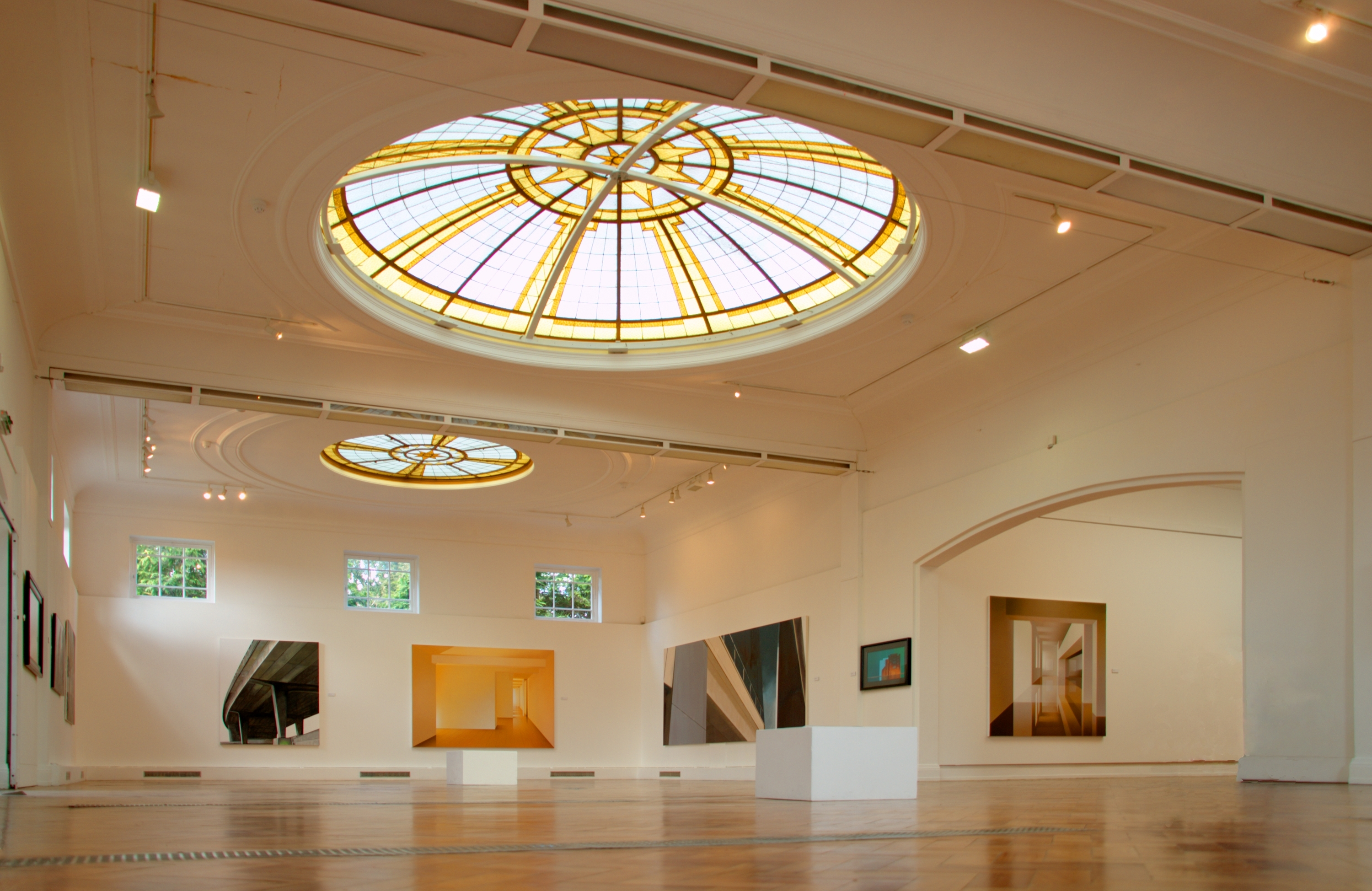
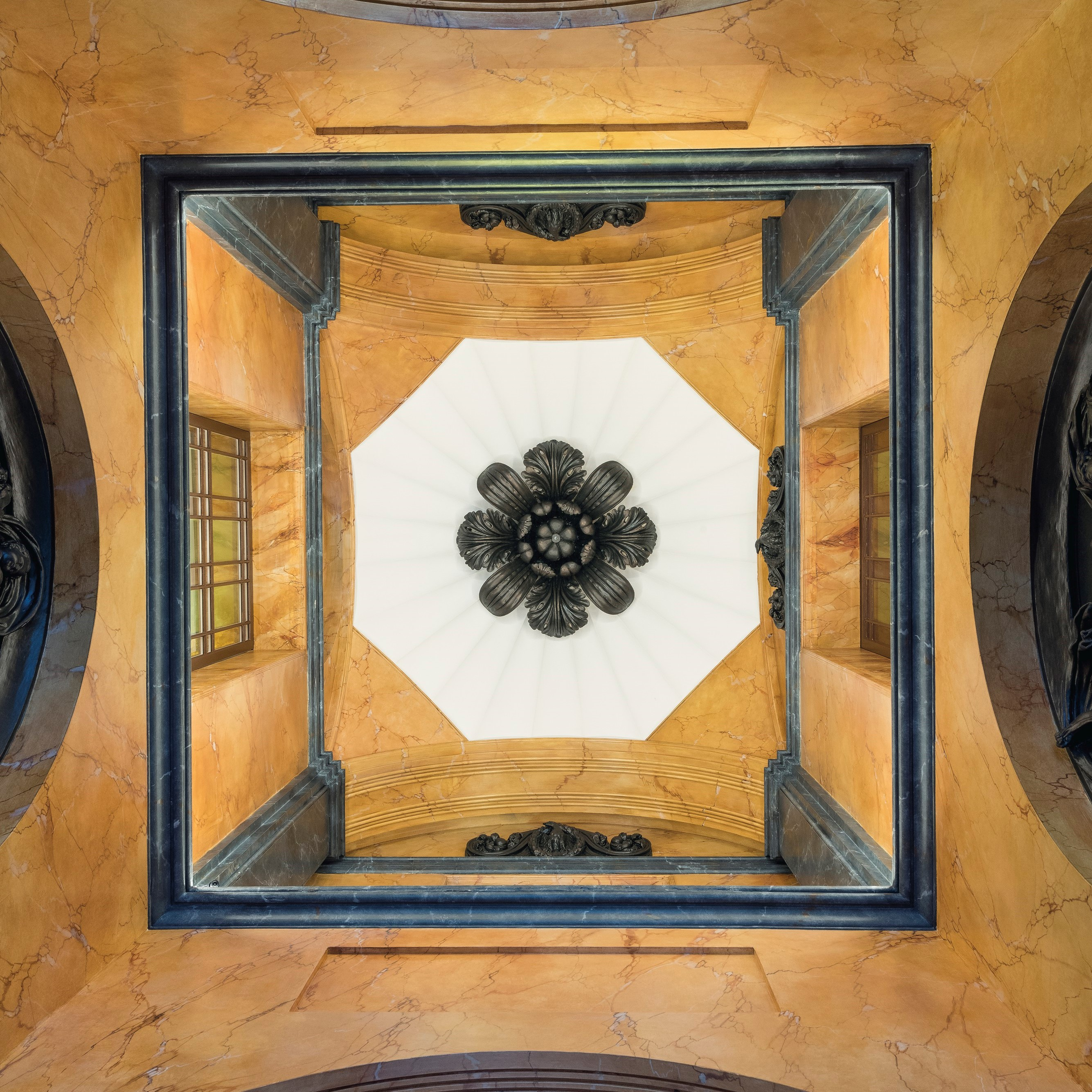
The Vestibule (above view).

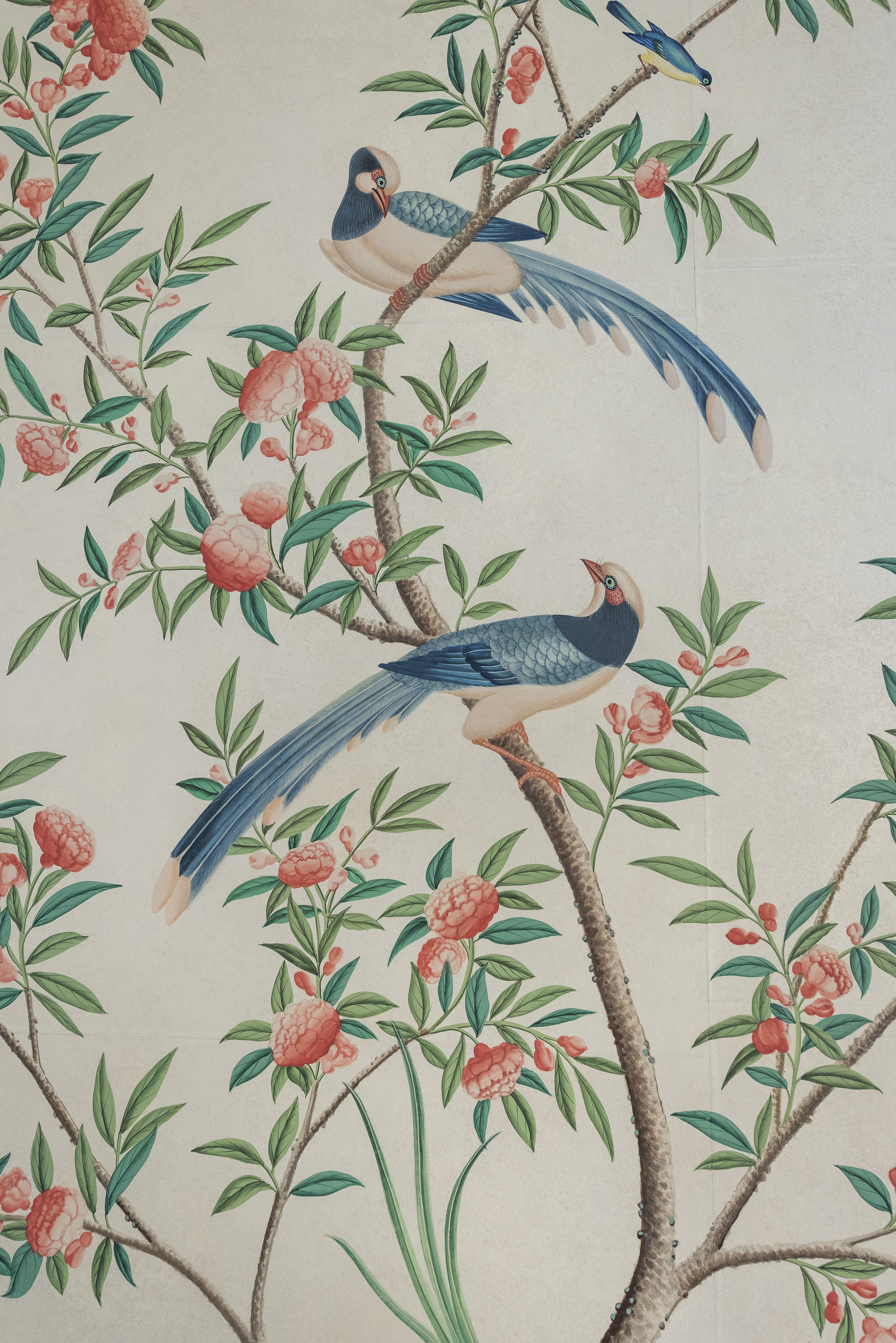
The Upper Drawing Room wallpaper (detail).

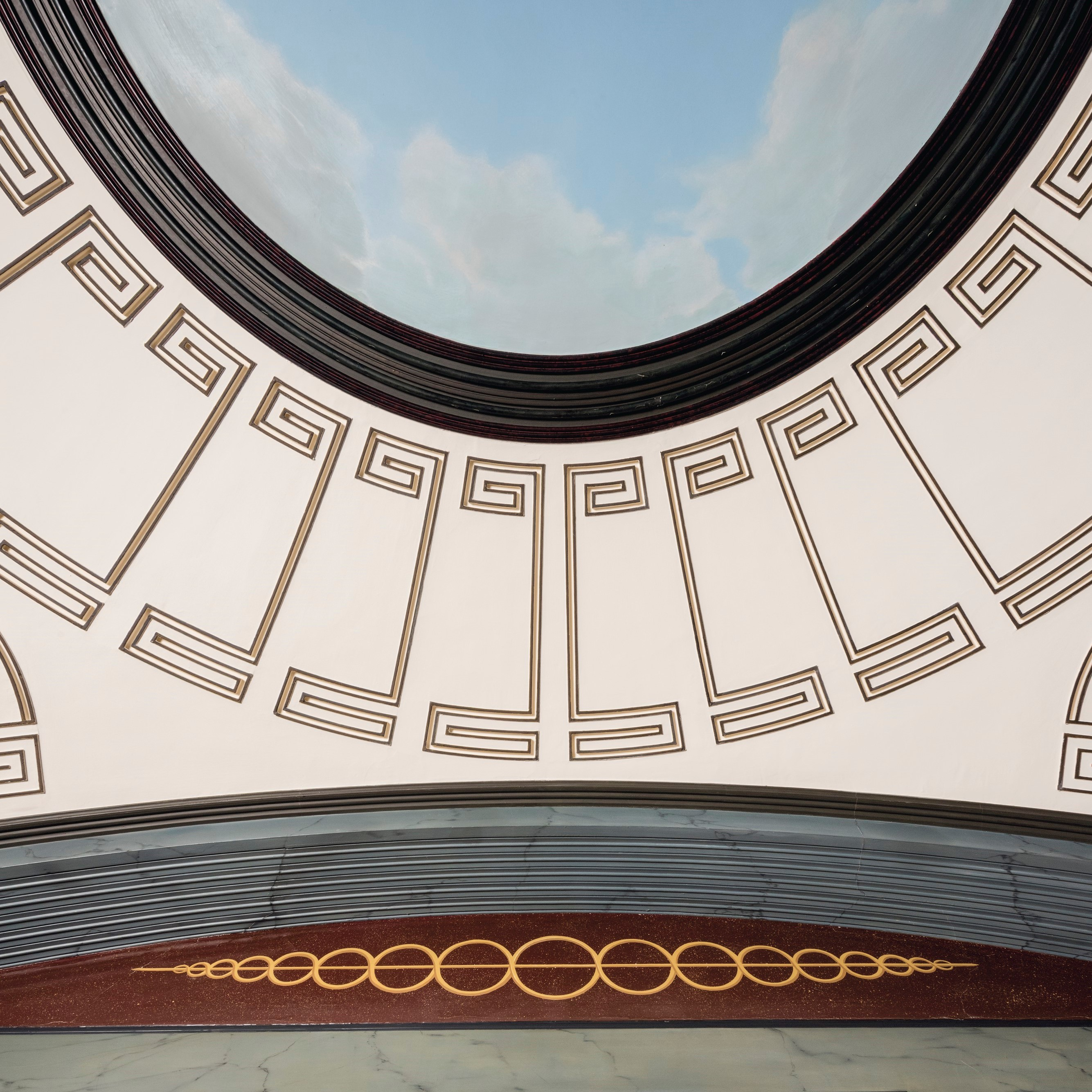
The Breakfast Room painted interiors (detail).

== Architecture ==
=== The Manor (1804) ===
Typical of Soane’s architectural style, Pitzhanger Manor is highly neo-classical in design, with elements of Italian Renaissance architecture and stylistic techniques characteristic of Soane himself.

Soane took inspiration from Romano-Grecian art and architecture, often employing them into his neoclassical designs. As Soane has recently been on his Grand Tour, Pitzhanger became exemplary of this stylistic influence. The Manor’s neoclassical features include: meanders, caryatids, ionic columns, the iconographic eagles with laurel wreaths, and so forth. He was particularly inspired by sites in Italy, such as the Arch of Constantine in his design of Pitzhanger. This architecture would have been highly complementary to the collection of Classical antiquities he housed in the Manor. The influence of Renaissance Italy, especially Palladian architecture, can be seen in its almost square design – barring the Dance Wing. Among these influences, Soane incorporated in his own architectural motifs: he included canopy ceilings, a masterful use of light and shadow, as well as economic and optical devices.

=== Ealing War Memorial (1919) ===
After the Armistice that marked the end of the First World War, it was decided that a memorial for the men of Ealing who had been killed in the war should be built. After much discussion, a location outside Pitzhanger Manor was finally chosen as the site. The memorial was to be in the form of a gateway with two walls, on each of which would be engraved the names of the dead. There would also be a tree-lined avenue from the road leading to the memorial. The memorial's designer was the architect Leonard Shuffrey, who lived in Ealing and whose son Gilbert is commemorated on the memorial. The pedestals came from Elm Grove, the former country residence of Spencer Perceval. On the Grade II gate is the following inscription:

In proud and grateful memory of the men of this borough who laid down their lives in the Great War 1914–1918.

The memorial was subsequently enlarged to include the names of the local dead of the Second World War.

== In culture ==
=== Art and artists ===
Pitzhanger Manor was conceived as Sir John Soane’s country villa where 200 guests could be entertained. Soane’s guests included an array of prominent creative contemporaries; John Flaxman, Nancy Storace, Matthew Gregory Lewis were among the Regency luminaries he hosted. It is reported that a young J.M.W. Turner was among his guests, having fished with Soane in the Manor’s ponds, now in Walpole Park.

The Soane family also acquired more contemporary artworks. Eliza Soane acquired William Hogarth's A Rake's Progress at a Christie's sales in 1802, which is thought to have been displayed in the Manor’s Small Drawing Room. Recently it was announced that the series of paintings would be exhibited again at Pitzhanger in March 2020, marking it as the third major exhibition, a year since the Gallery's 2019 reopening.

=== Film and television location ===
Pitzhanger's authentic period look it has been registered as a film location and as such is available for hire. It also sits next to Ealing Studios. It has featured in:

- The Importance of Being Earnest (2002) with Judi Dench, Rupert Everett and Colin Firth. The pre-restored George Dance wing and its Victorian extension was used.
- The Biographer (First Biography Films, 2000). Pitzhanger Manor used to double as Kensington Palace. Pitshanger Gallery (as it was then called) doubled as The Tate in this 1990s period drama about biographer Andrew Morton (played by Paul McGann).
- Kavanagh QC (Carlton TV, 1998). Pitzhanger Gallery doubled as a Crown Court, effectively a full set build apart from the ceiling light.
- Doctor Who: More Than 30 Years in the TARDIS (BBC, Sunday 7 November 1993). Sarah Jane Smith (played by Elisabeth Sladen) and her daughter Sadie are pursued by a Sontaran, played by Stephen Mansfield. This short shot was for a one-off anniversary programme, made in the style of a documentary.

== Other Soane buildings in London ==
- Sir John Soane’s Museum, Holborn
- Dulwich Picture Gallery, Dulwich
- Bank of England, City of London
- Holy Trinity Church, Marylebone
- St Peter's Church, Walworth
- St John on Bethnal Green
- The Soane Tomb, St Pancras Old Church Gardens

== Bibliography ==
- Baker, T F T, and C R Elrington (editors); Diane K Bolton, Patricia E C Croot, M A Hicks. A History of the County of Middlesex Volume 7, Acton, Chiswick, Ealing and Brentford, West Twyford, Willesden, 1982. Victoria County History. British History Online. University of London & History of Parliament Trust. (The volume completes the coverage of outer Middlesex with the five outer parishes of the Kensington division of Ossulstone hundred.) Accessed 2007-05-12
- Ewing, Heather. "Pitzhanger Manor." Pp. 142–49. In Margaret Richardson and MaryAnne Stevens, eds., John Soane, Architect: Master of Space and Light. London: Royal Academy, 1999. ISBN 0-900946-80-6 (paper); ISBN 0-300-08195-2 (hard). Catalogue of an exhibition held at the Royal Academy of Arts in 1999.
- Hounsell, Peter. Ealing and Hanwell Past. London: Historical Publications, 1991. ISBN 0-948667-13-3. Pp. 24, 26, 98, 99.
- Leary, Emmeline. Pitshanger Manor: An Introduction. New ed. [Ealing, London]: Ealing Community Services, [1990]. ISBN 0-86192-090-2. The booklet now (early 2008) sold in the Manor as a guide and souvenir. Although the publication is not dated, the short introduction is dated January 1990 and is clearly written for publication.
- Neaves, Cyrill. A History of Greater Ealing. N.p. (UK): S. R. Publishers, 1971. ISBN 0-85409-679-5. Pp. 65, 76.
- Scala Arts Heritage Publishers. "Pitzhanger Manor: John Soane's Country Home." London: Scala Editions, 2019. ISBN 9781785512032 (paper).
