= List of public art in the London Borough of Harrow =

This is a list of public art in the London Borough of Harrow.

== Belmont ==
Image	Title / subject	Location and coordinates	Date	Artist / designer	Type	Designation	Notes
	Subway mural	Belmont Trail subway, near medical centre and St Joseph's Catholic Primary School 51.6012°N 0.3198°W	2012	Harrow Arts Centre and Alistair Lambert working with St Joseph's Catholic Primary School	Mural	—	

== Edgware ==
Image	Title / subject	Location and coordinates	Date	Artist / designer	Type	Designation	Notes
	Edgware War Memorial	High Street 51.6113°N 0.2802°W	1920	?	Celtic cross	Grade II	Unveiled 27 March 1920.

== Greenhill ==
Image	Title / subject	Location and coordinates	Date	Artist / designer	Type	Designation	Notes
More images	Greenhill War Memorial	St John's churchyard 51.58266°N 0.3318°W	1951	?	Pillar	Grade II	

== Harrow ==
Image	Title / subject	Location and coordinates	Date	Artist / designer	Type	Designation	Notes
More images	Skipping Girl	St Ann's Road 51.5813°N 0.3337°W	1987	James Butler	Statue	—	
	The Leaf	The Grove Field, Lowlands Road, Harrow 51.5779°N 0.3377°W	1994	Diane Maclean	Sculpture	—	
	Harrow War Memorial	Station Road, outside Harrow Civic Centre 51.5898°N 0.3330°W	2005	?	Pillar/column	—	
	Inner View	Alexandra Park, South Harrow	2007	Lorraine Benton	Sculpture	—	
	Mural	Kymberley Road, on wall of St George's Shopping Centre 51.5810°N 0.3340°W	2014	Local people	Mural	—	

== Harrow on the Hill ==
Image	Title / subject	Location and coordinates	Date	Artist / designer	Type	Designation	Notes
	Gantry with portrait of Henry VIII	Junction of High Street and Byron Hill Road 51.5704°N 0.3397°W	c. 1780				Restored and placed on current site in 2010.
	Statue of Elizabeth I	Harrow School, on south tower of Speech Room, overlooking Peterborough Road 51.5737°N 0.3367°W	c. 1820	Richard Westmacott	Statue in niche	Grade II*	Originally at Ashridge Park, Hertfordshire, the statue was moved to Harrow School in 1925.
	Thomas Charles Hudson Drinking Fountain	Junction of High Street and West Street 51.5722°N 0.3381°W	1880	?	Drinking fountain	Grade II	
More images	Harrow on the Hill War Memorial	Grove Hill, at junction with Lowlands Road 51.5769°N 0.3354°W	1921	W. D. Caröe	Memorial cross	Grade II	
	Memorial to Britain's first recorded fatal car accident, in 1899	Junction of Peterborough Road and Grove Hill 51.5737°N 0.3364°W	1969				
	Hygeia	College Road	1991	?	Architectural sculpture	—	
	Charles I commemorative plaque	Grove Hill 51.5742°N 0.3361°W					
	Two eagles	70 High Street, on top of porch 51.57115°N 0.33906°W					

== Harrow Weald ==
Image	Title / subject	Location and coordinates	Date	Artist / designer	Architect / other	Type	Designation	Notes
	Harrow Weald War Memorial	High Road, at junction with Box Tree Road 51.6074°N 0.3404°W	1917	L. F. W. Deacon and J. C. Rackham		Street shrine	—	
	Crucifixion with Saints	St Joseph's Church, High Road	1931	?	Adrian Gilbert Scott	Architectural sculpture		

== Pinner ==
Image	Title / subject	Location and coordinates	Date	Artist / designer	Architect / other	Type	Designation	Notes
More images	Tooke Drinking Fountain William Arthur Tooke JP	Church Lane 51.5932°N 0.3749°W	1886	?	—	Drinking fountain	Grade II	
More images	Pinner War Memorial	High Street, near junction with Grange Gardens 51.5944°N 0.3798°W	1921	Bertram Mackennal	—	Pillar/column	Grade II	
	Saint Luke Painting the Virgin	St Luke's Church, Love Lane	1957	David John	Francis Xavier Velarde	Architectural sculpture	Grade II	

== Roxbourne ==
Image	Title / subject	Location and coordinates	Date	Artist / designer	Architect / other	Type	Designation	Notes
	Saint Andrew	St Andrew's Church, Malvern Avenue	1957	Darsie Rawlins	Farey & Adams	Architectural sculpture	Grade II	

== Stanmore ==
Image	Title / subject	Location and coordinates	Date	Artist / designer	Type	Designation	Notes
More images	Stanmore War Memorial	St John's churchyard 51.6161°N 0.3152°W	1920	?	Celtic cross	Grade II	Unveiled 22 July 1922.

== Wealdstone ==
Image	Title / subject	Location and coordinates	Date	Artist / designer	Type	Designation	Notes
More images	Wealdstone War Memorial	Junction of Spencer Road and High Street 51.5972°N 0.3359°W	1923	Harold F. Walker and J. C. Rackham	Clock tower	Grade II	
	Mural commemorating the Harrow and Wealdstone rail crash	Outside Harrow & Wealdstone station 51.5922°N 0.3343°W	2004	Local schoolchildren	Mural	—	
