= Walpole Park =

Park in Ealing, London, England

- Interactive map of Walpole Park
- Location: London Borough of Ealing
- Opened: 1901
- Operator: Ealing Council
- Public transit: Ealing Broadway; South Ealing

Walpole Park is a 28-acre (11 ha) Grade II municipal park, situated in Ealing (West London), England. Currently governed by Ealing Council, it was initially the grounds of Pitzhanger Manor, the early 19th-century country home of Sir John Soane. It was acquired by Ealing Council in 1899 and opened to the public for the first time on 1 May 1901.

The park itself is listed at grade II on the Register of Parks and Gardens of Special Historic Interest in England. Within its boundaries are additional statutory protected structures: Pitzhanger Manor & Gallery (listed Grade I) and Lodge (listed Grade II). Other attractions featured in its grounds include the late Victorian ornamental Serpentine Lake, bordering the House's rear lawn, and a pond further west with a pair of fountains – both of which attract waterfowl.

== History ==
Pitzhanger Manor and its grounds (later Walpole Park) was once owned by the influential British architect, Sir John Soane, who bought it in 1800. During 1800 to 1803, Soane transformed Pitzhanger Manor's architecture and hired landscape gardener, John Haverfield to transform its grounds. Its ownership changed hands several times after Soane sold it in 1810. Eventually it was purchased for £40,000 in 1899 by the Urban District Council of Ealing from Sir Spencer Walpole, having previously been bought by his father, the Rt. Hon. Spencer Horatio Walpole. The Borough surveyor Charles Jones who negotiated the terms of the sale with his close friend Spencer Walpole also went on to set out the design of tree-lined avenues, paths and flower beds. The outer path is nearly a mile in circumference. The sides of the pond nearest Pitzhanger Manor were planted with shrubs and other plants.

Soane's Manor then became Ealing Borough's central public lending library. The library vacated the site in 1984. Work then began on researching the building to discover the original décor and renovating it back to how it had been in Soane's day. A library extension that had been built on the north-side was converted into the present-day art gallery.

At the end of the 1980s some restoration work was done to recreate some of the original layout by Soane's and Haverfield's garden. In 1987 it was registered by English Heritage on the Register of Parks and Gardens of Special Historic Interest in England.

The park was extensively renovated from August 2013 on-wards and reopened fully in the summer of 2014. Two new ponds replaced the ornamental lake and the fishpond. Breeding wildfowl have returned to the park and the new flower beds are developing, with Regency planting. The bridge which was situated at one end of the sunken garden has been restored.

== Features ==
=== Boundary Wall ===
Walpole Park's north boundary wall likely dates from the late-18th century and is Grade II listed. Facing Mattock Lane, the red-brick wall is 10 feet high and spans 50 yards of the park's northern perimeter, from Walpole's entrance arch to the public conveniences.

=== Gates ===
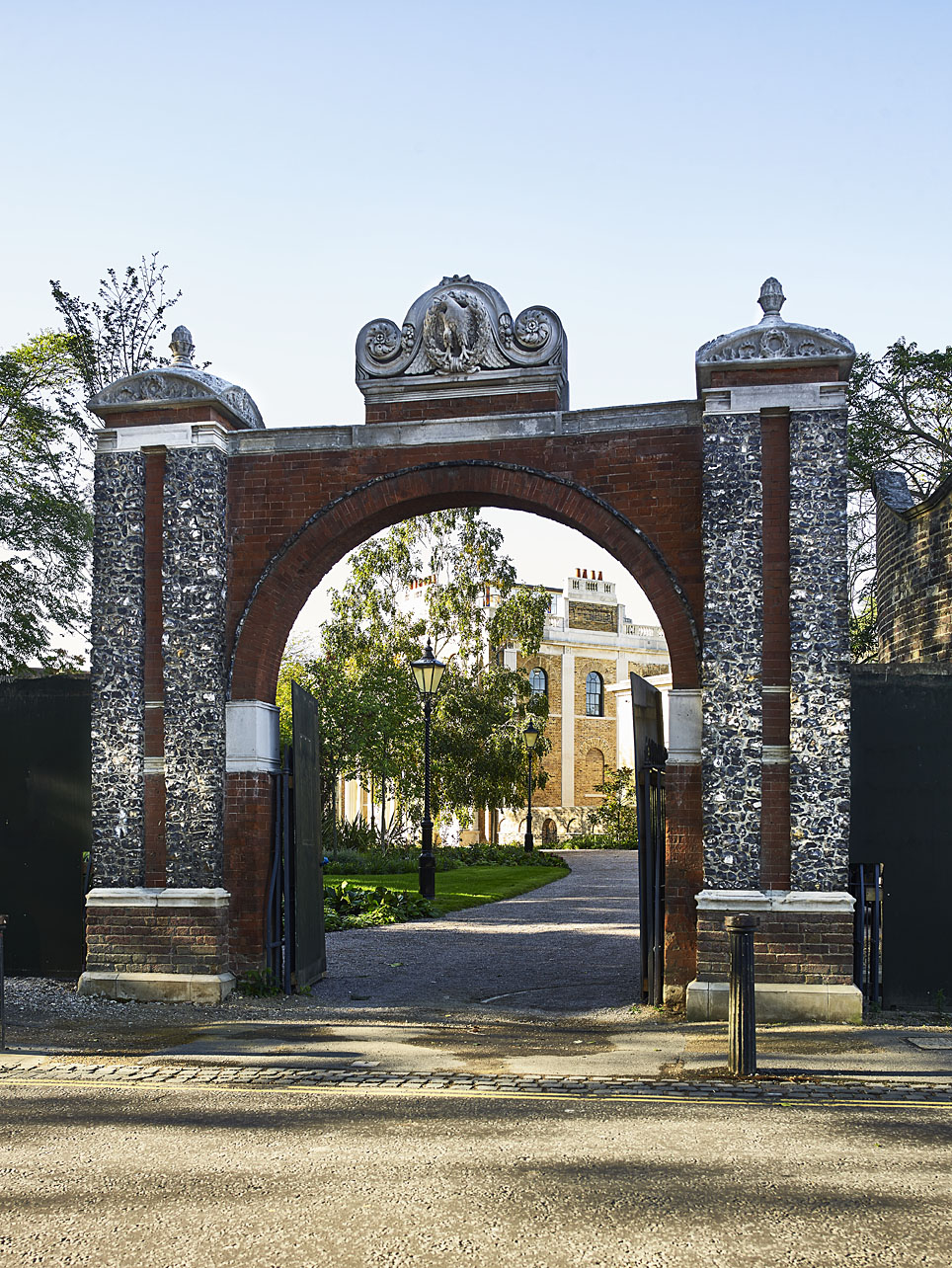
Main entrance into Walpole Park. Image: Angelo Hornak. © Pitzhanger Manor & Gallery Trust

Pitzhanger Manor's archway was originally produced by John Soane as his Manor's entrance, and is now in use as the park's main entryway. A Grade I listed building, the arch is still made of the original brick and flint materials used by Soane. It is located horizontal to Pitzhanger's front-face at the north-east end of Walpole Park.

Metres away from the arch is the Ealing War Memorial. This Portland stone entry features as both a park gate and a commemoration of Ealing locals who lost their lives in the first and second world wars.

=== Buildings ===
The neoclassical Pitzhanger Manor & Gallery are located by the main entrance to Walpole Park. The Manor and Gallery's recent renovations from 2015 to 2019 have provided an insight to the intended designs of the Regency Manor in its Regency park - particularly, its reinstated conservatory.

Established in 2015, The Rickyard is a new learning center provided by Ealing Council, located next to the park's playground. It facilities include classroom, park toilets, park staff office and additional support facilities for park maintenance staff. It features a kiosk cafe, Pitzhanger Pantry, as well as houses beehives.

Acting as the official Pitzhanger cafe, Soane's Kitchen neighbours the Manor.

Views of Walpole Park's Architecture
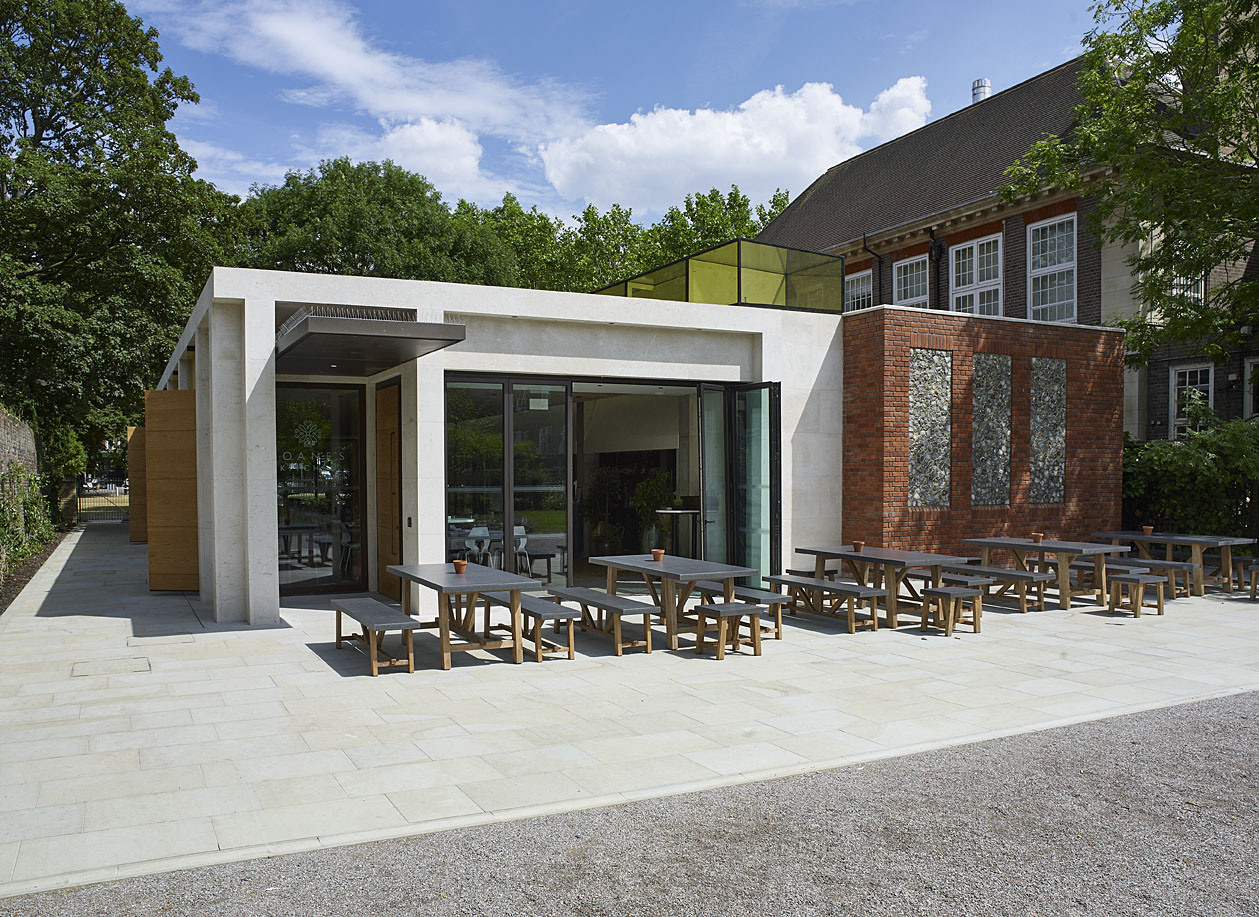
Soane's Kitchen. Image: Angelo Hornak. © Pitzhanger Manor & Gallery Trust

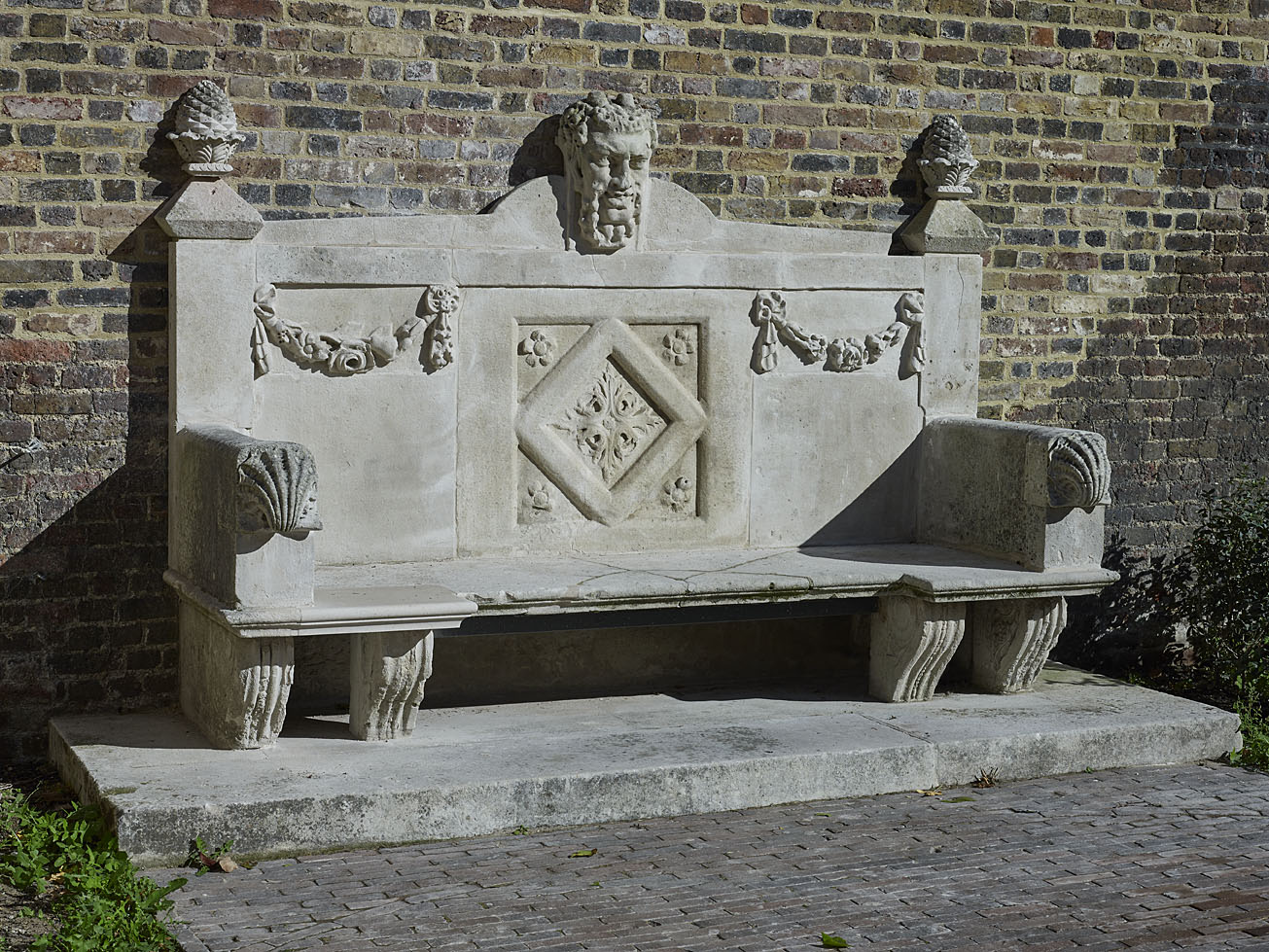
Soane's bench in Walpole Park. Image: Angelo Hornak. © Pitzhanger Manor & Gallery Trust

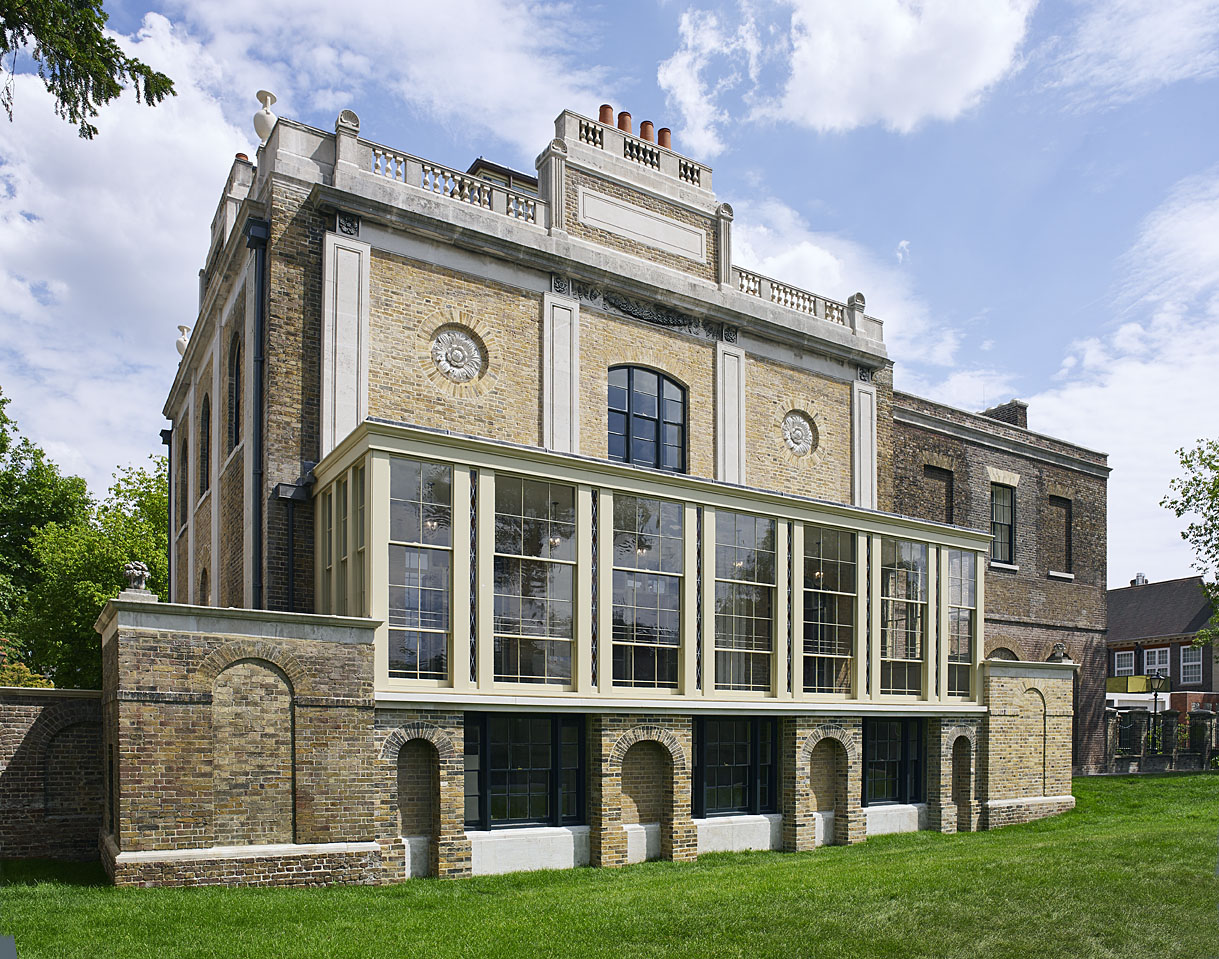
Pitzhanger Manor (West Face, with conservatory) Image: Angelo Hornak. © Pitzhanger Manor & Gallery Trust

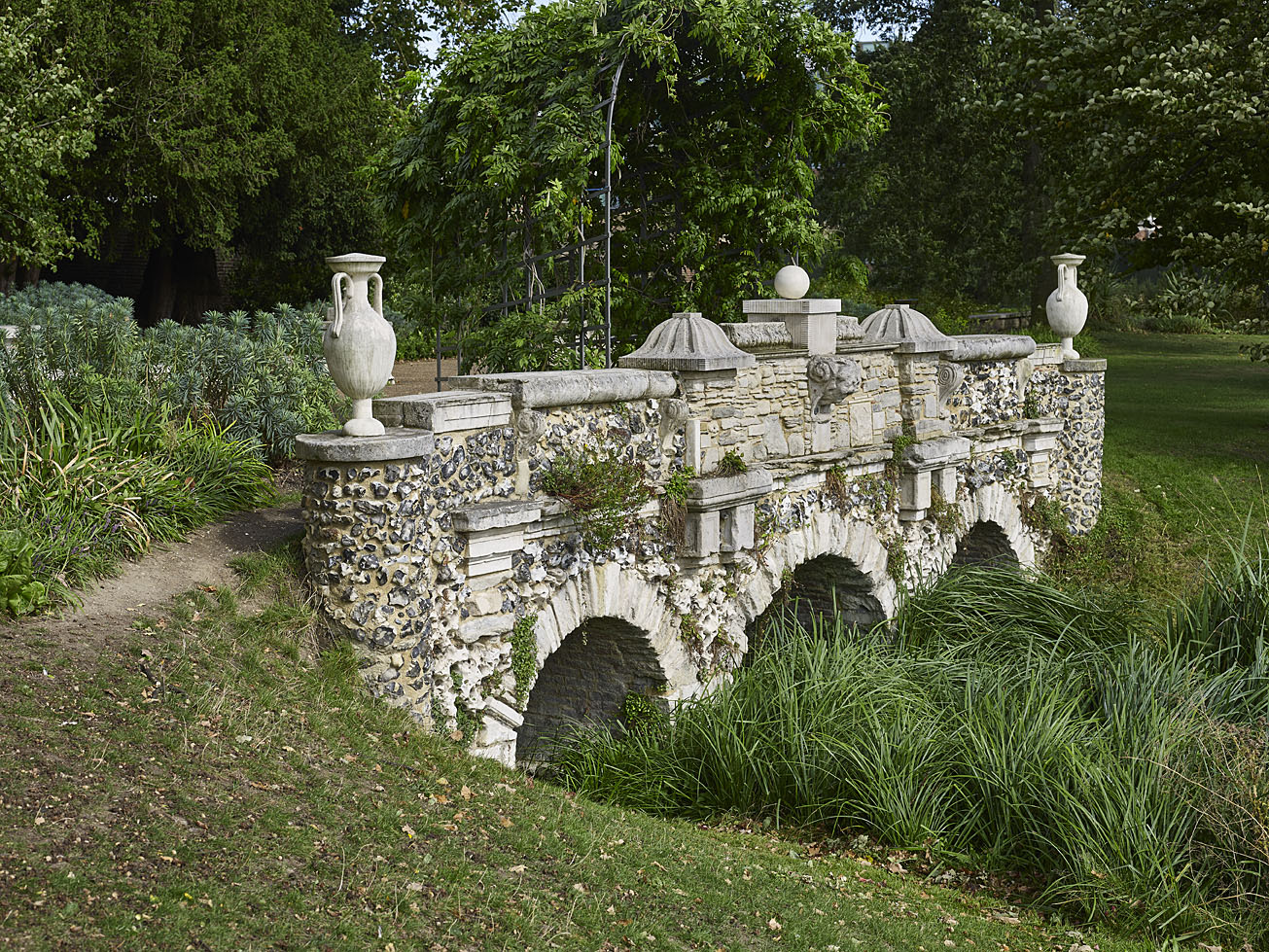
Ornamental bridge designed and built by Sir John Soane. Image: Angelo Hornak © Pitzhanger Manor & Gallery Trust

=== Parkland ===
Most of the park consists of open flat grassed areas bordered by tree lined avenues, which act as wind breaks.

Of the two ponds, the westernmost was the larger of the two and was more formal. It also featured a fountain. The pond nearest to Pitzhanger Manor on the eastward side of the park had sunken sides, which were planted with a mixture of ornamental shrubs and bushes. The pond itself was made to look as though it was a small gently flowing brook. A contemporary drawing of the manor house in the museum suggests that, at the time of Soane, this pond was much deeper. It was from its sides that John Soane and his friend J. M. W. Turner (the artist) would sit and fish. As the grounds to the west were pastoral it is quite possible that this pond was constructed as a ha-ha against cattle and sheep. The bridge at the north end, and the pond, were in existence before Soane bought the property but he had it decorated to give an appearance of great antiquity, no doubt to match his faux Roman ruins which he built just to the north of his house. It is a listed Grade II* structure.

Along the north perimeter wall is a large stone bench. This also is Grade II listed. Next to the bench is a memorial plaque dedicated to Charles Jones, an architect who lived in Ealing, designed Ealing Town Hall, and served as the town's mayor.

Views of Walpole Parkland and Wildlife
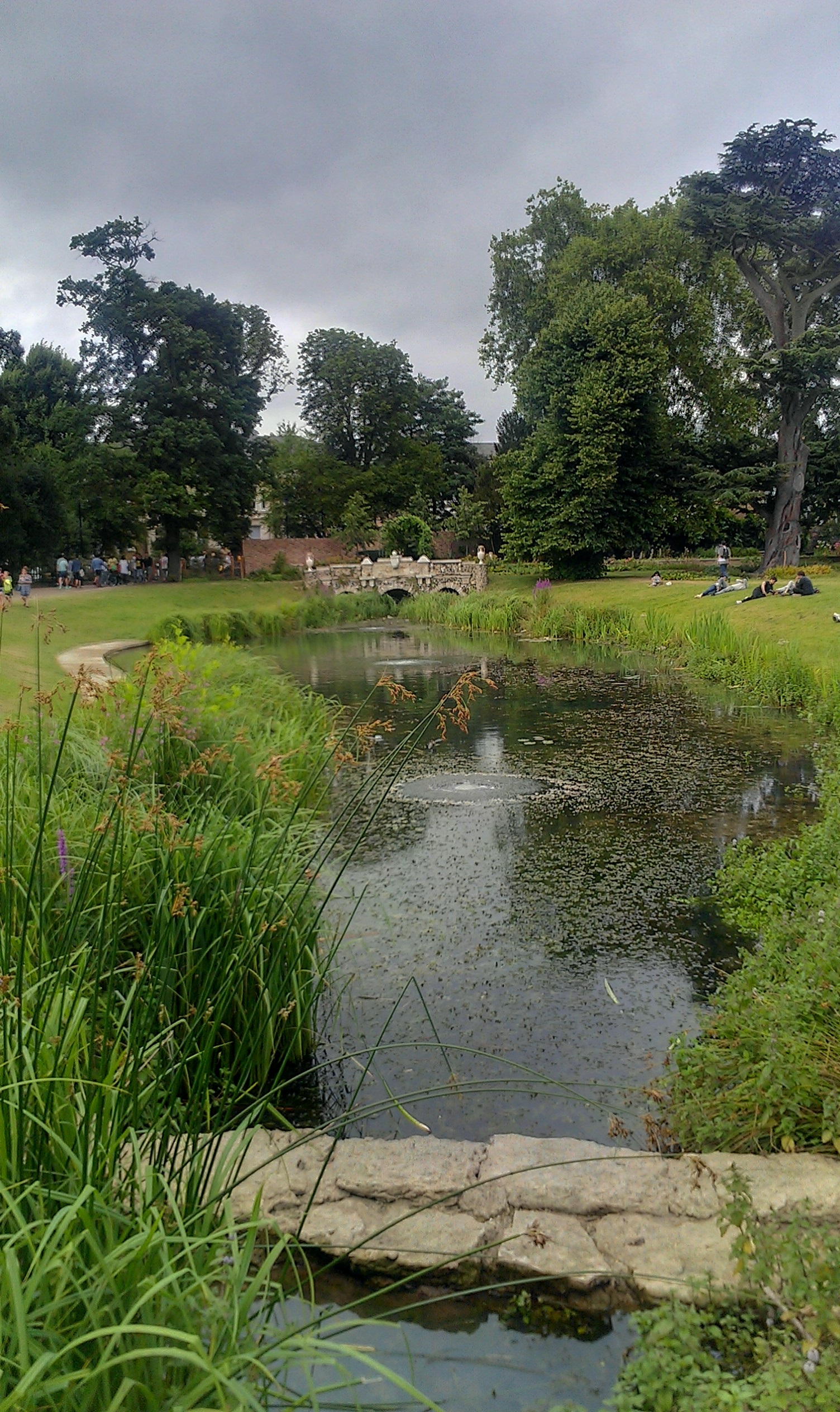
The Serpentine Lake.

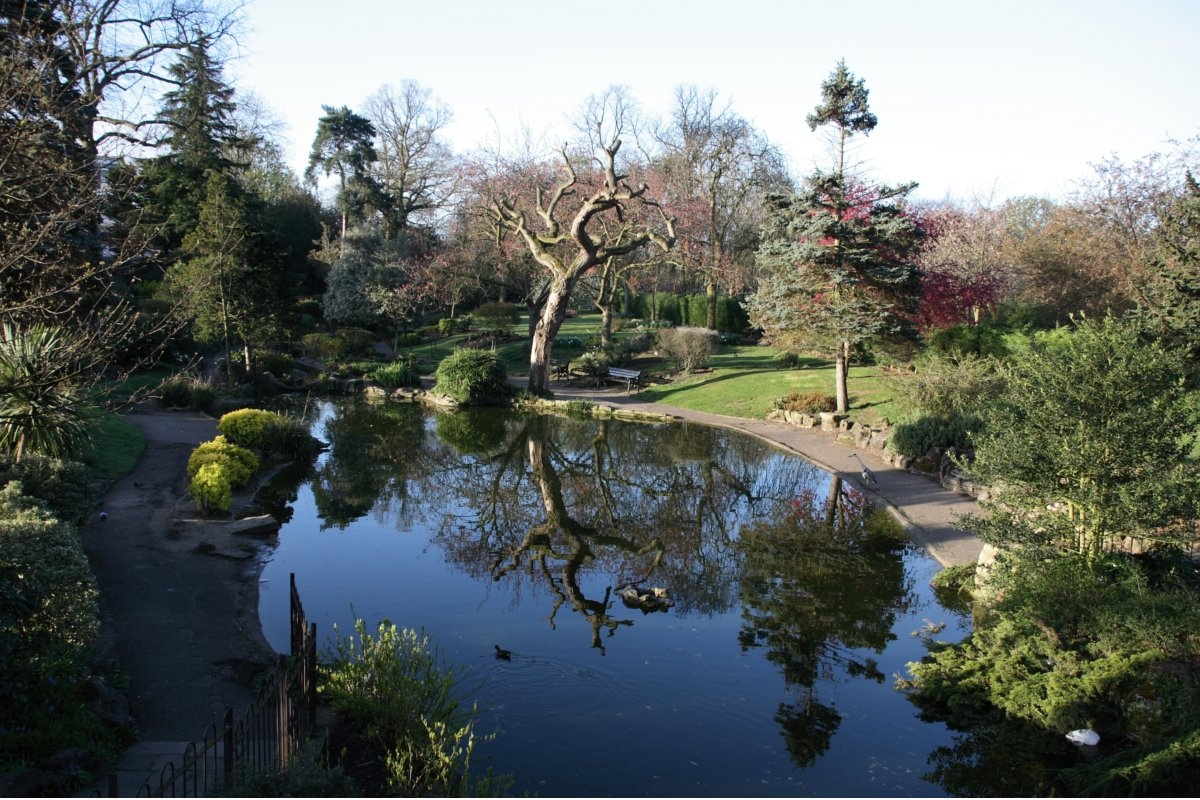
Pond in sunken garden.

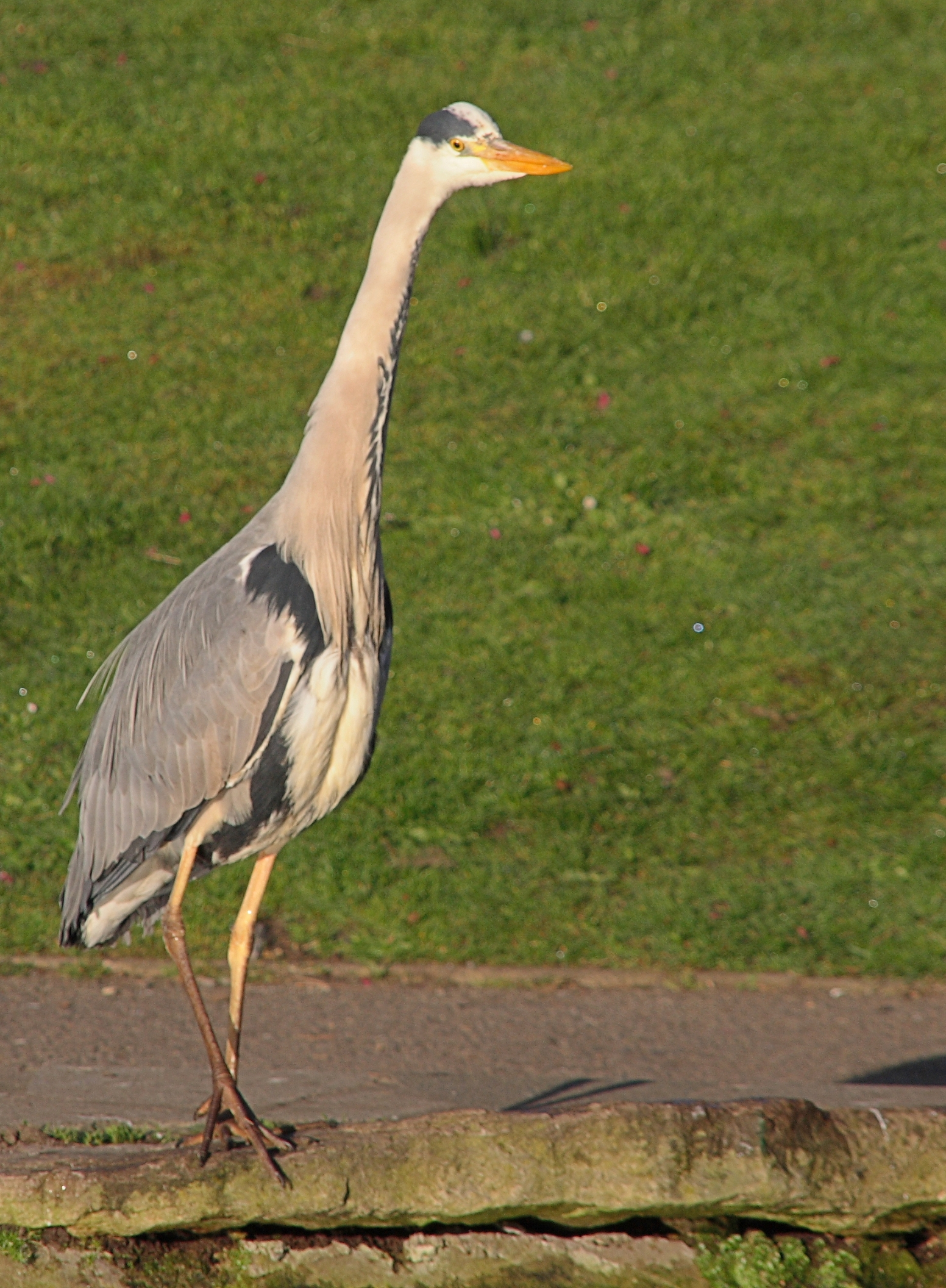
A grey heron (Ardea cinerea).

== Visit ==
=== Getting there ===
Ealing Broadway is the nearest National Rail, Crossrail and London Underground station to Walpole Park's main entrance, being an 8-minute walk from the site. It is connected by the Elizabeth, District and Central lines, and 9-minute journey from Paddington station.

South Ealing tube station is the closest on the Piccadilly line, with a 15-minute walk to Walpole's main entry or a 5-minute bus journey (via 65).

There are several London buses which stop within a short walk to Walpole: 65, 207, 427, 607, E1, E11, 112, E2, E7, E8, E9, E10, 483, 226, 297.

In particular, the 65 from Ealing Broadway Station to Ealing Broadway Shopping Centre provides a 2-minute walk to the park's entrance. Likewise, the E2, E7 and E8 from Ealing Broadway Station to Ealing Town Hall all offer a 5-minute walk.

=== Events ===
Ealing Summer Festivals host annual events in Walpole Park during the summer months. Its programme features:

- Ealing Beer Festival
- Ealing Comedy Festival
- Ealing Opera in the Park
- Ealing Blues Festival
- Ealing Global Festival
- Ealing Jazz Festival
