= Gary Drostle =

British artist (b1961)

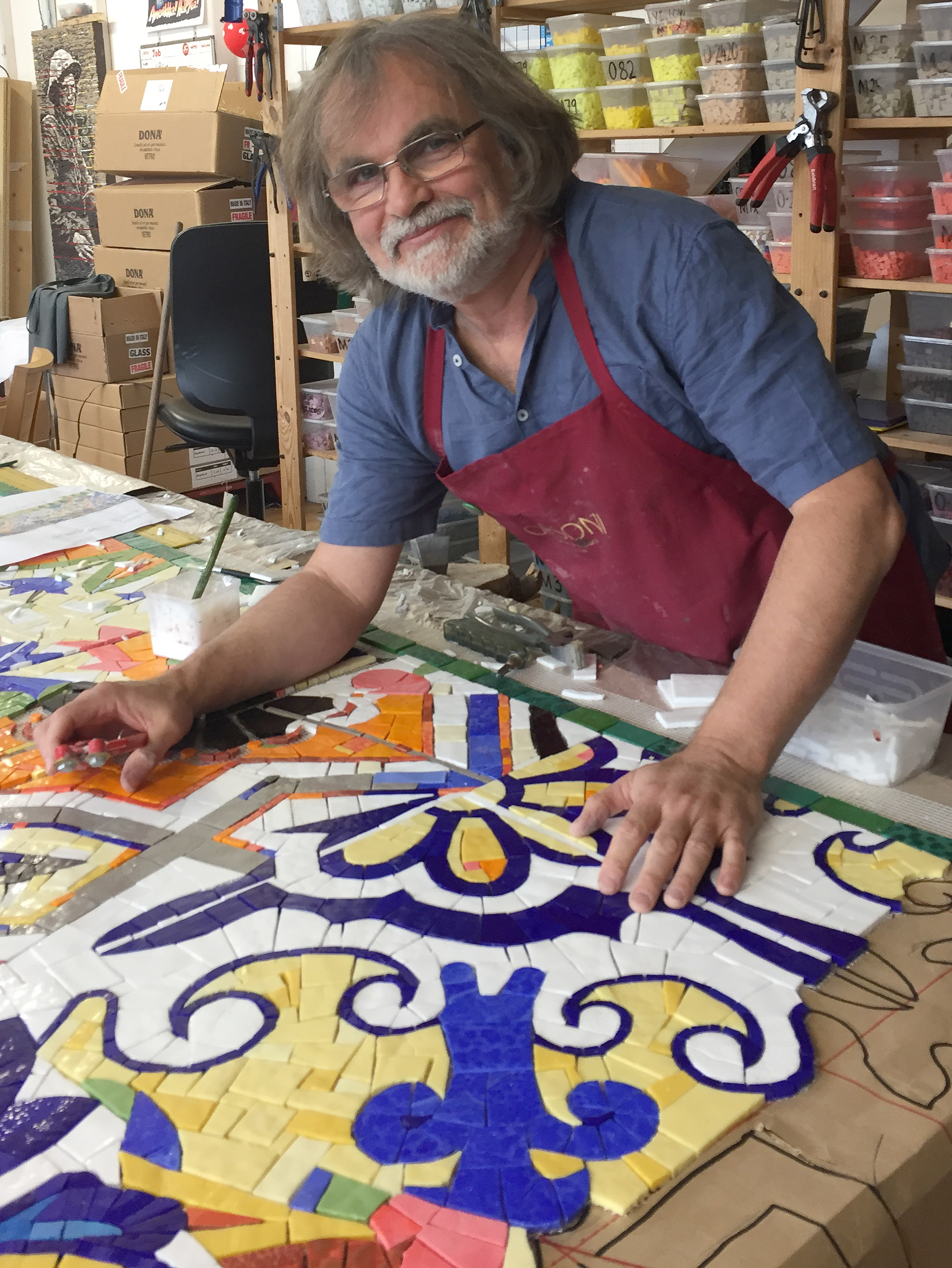
- Artist Gary Drostle in his studio
- Born: Gary Frederick Drostle; 1961 (age 64–65); Woolwich, London, England
- Education: St Martin's School of Art, Hornsey College of Art
- Known for: Mosaics, Sculpture, Mural Painting
- Website: Gary Drostle

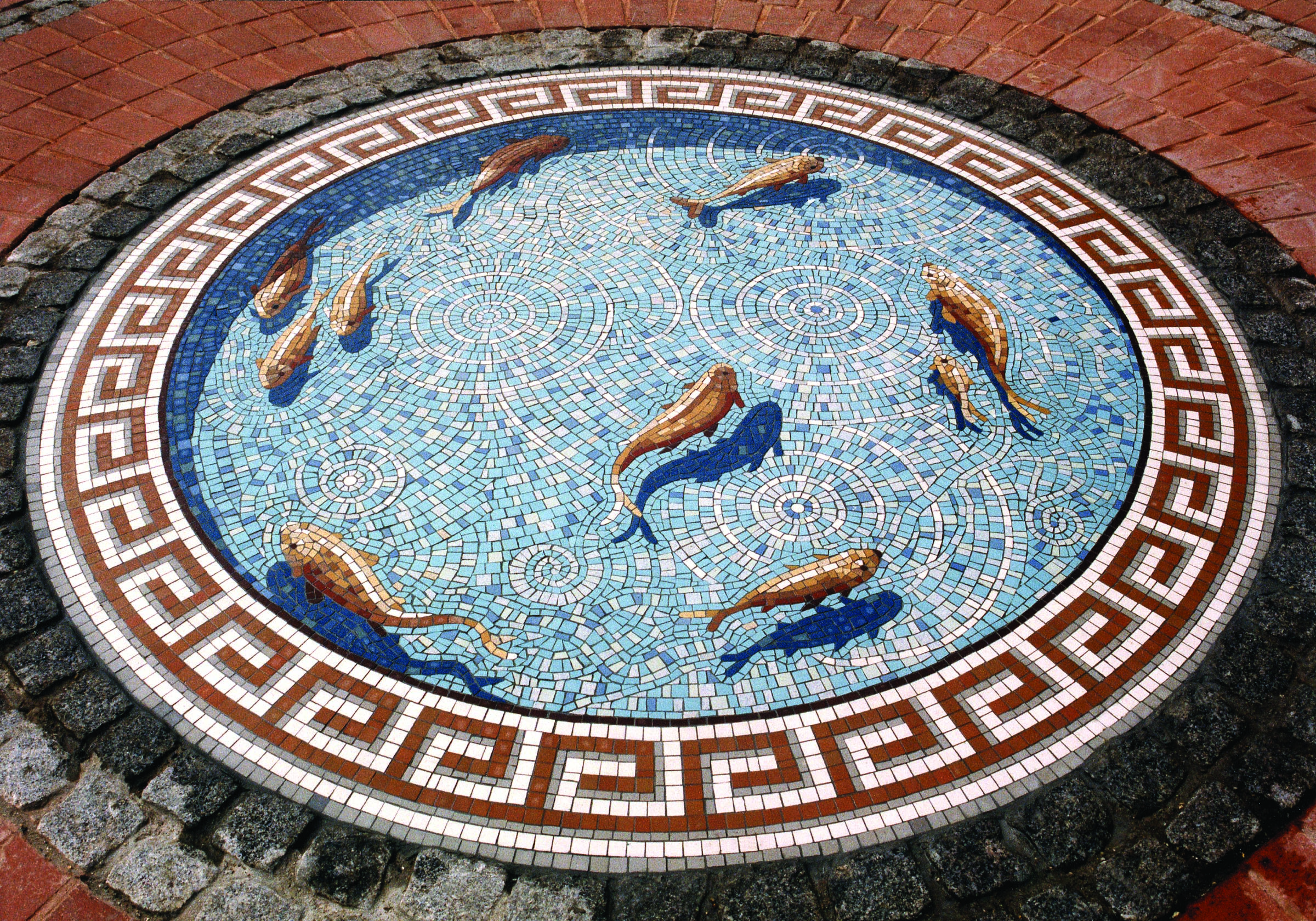
Fishpond Mosaic designed by Gary Drostle and made by Gary Drostle and Rob Turner in 1996 for Croydon Council, south London.

Gary Drostle (born 1961) is a British artist specialising in public art, sculpture and mosaic as well as mural painting and drawing. He was also President of the British Association for Modern Mosaic, a lecturer at The Chicago Mosaic School. and is on the editorial board of Andamento the Journal of Contemporary Mosaics.

== Early years and education ==
Born in Woolwich, London, United Kingdom, the son of Docker and Trade Union activist Frederick Drostle. He studied art at the St Martin's School of Art (1979) and Hornsey College of Art (1980–1983) (now Middlesex University) where he undertook a Bachelor of Arts (Fine Art).

His graduate work was selected for the Christie's 'Pick of the New Graduate Art' exhibition in 1984.

== Public Art career ==
Haringey Hospitals Mural Project

After leaving art college in 1984 he worked on a Government employment program creating murals for Haringey Hospitals.

Haringey Mural Workshop

In 1987 he founded 'Haringey Mural Workshop' with four other members of the Hospital Arts Program: Ruth Priestly; Hilary Leobner; Joanne White and Paul Beaumont. They designed and painted their first major public commission 'History of the Peoples Palace' mural series for Alexandra Palace in London in 1987.

Wallscapes

When the Haringey Mural Workshop disbanded in 1989 Gary set up the Arts Group 'Wallscapes' initially with Belfast artist Ruth Priestly, together receiving their first public mosaic commission in 1990 from London Borough of Islington. In 1990 Ruth returned to Belfast and Gary was joined by fellow St Martins colleague, artist Rob Turner. He worked with Rob Turner from 1990 to 2001 completing many major public art commissions across the UK including works for Sutton in Surrey, Gloucester city centre and Chingford Library for Waltham Forest Council.

Drostle Public Arts

In 2001 the Wallscapes partnership was dissolved and Gary set up a new studio in Greenwich to creating public art and mosaics. Since 2001 he has continued designing and making large scale public artworks, murals and mosaics across the UK and in the USA. He now works from a studio at The Lakeside Centre, a Bow Arts Trust and Peabody Trust partnership Arts Centre in Thamesmead, south-east London

In 2006 he received a Queen Elizabeth Scholarship Trust award to further study mosaic making at the famous Orsoni Mosaic Works in Venice. In 2015 he undertook the major restoration and replacement works of the Eduardo Paolozzi Mosaics on the Central Line platforms at Tottenham Court Road tube station.

== Notable works ==
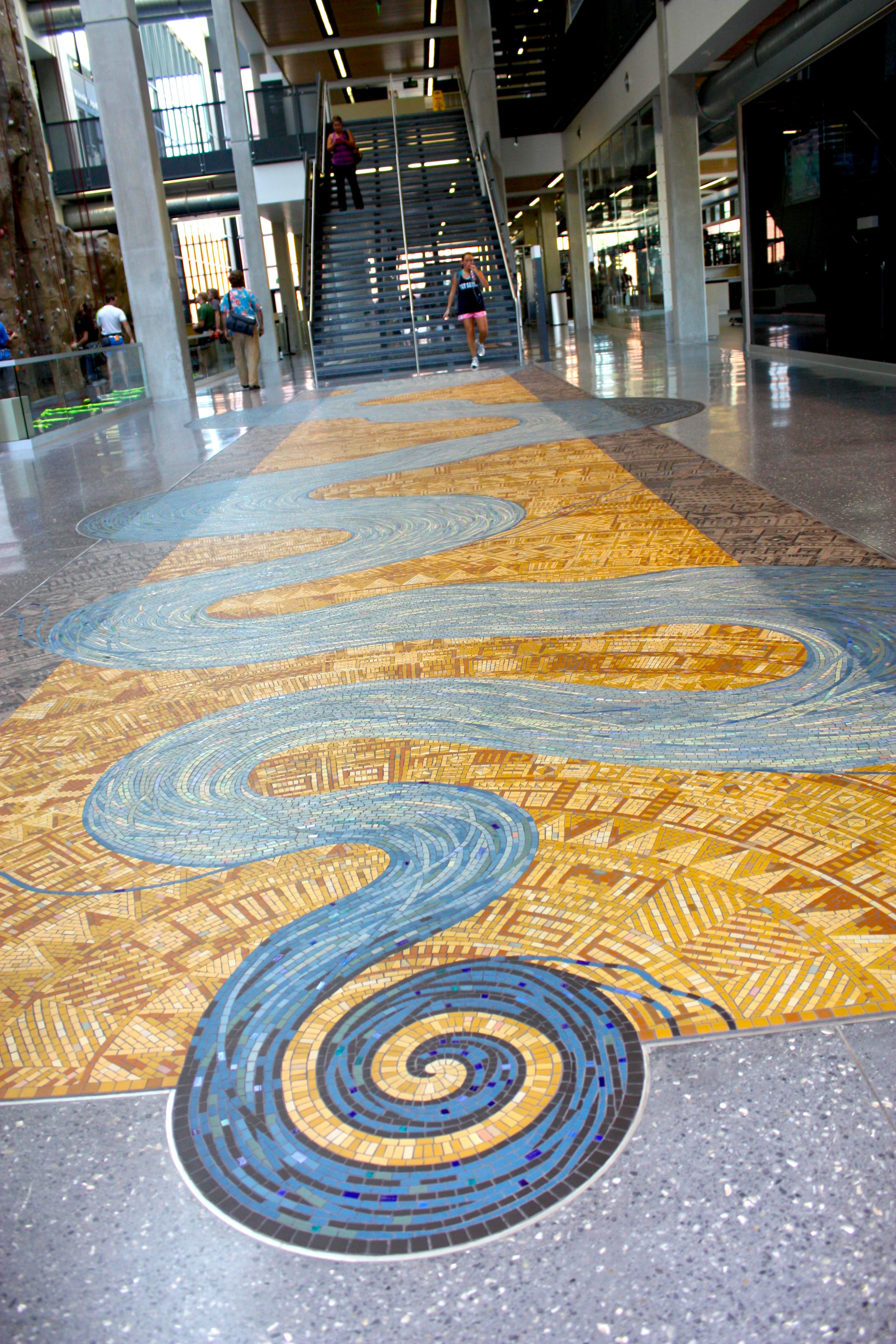
The River of Life Mosaic at the University of Iowa Campus Recreation and Wellness Center designed and made by Gary Drostle in 2010.

- (1987) The History of the Peoples Palace – Series of eleven Keim Murals painted in the West Corridor, Alexandra Palace, Muswell Hill, London, UK.
- (1989) Love Over Gold Mural - Keim wall mural on the side of Outset UK disability training centre (now Cockpit Arts Deptford).
- (1994) Sutton Heritage Mosaic - Porcelain Mosaic in Sutton Town Square, commissioned by London Borough of Sutton, UK.
- (1998) Gloucester Trade Trail Mosaics - A series of eleven floor mosaics for Northgate and Southgate in Gloucester, UK.
- (2000) One Town That Changed The World - Gable end mural depicting the Industrial Heritage of Dartford in Kent, UK.
- (2006) The De Luci Fish Roundabout - 7.5-metre high glass mosaic clad sculpture of three entwined fish created for Bronze Age Way in Erith, London, UK.
- (2010) The River of Life Mosaic - Large ceramic floor mosaic created for the entrance lobby of the CRWC building University of Iowa, Iowa City, IA.
- (2015) A Walk Along The California Seashore - Series of ten mosaic panels set in bespoke terrazzo floor for the Lucile Packard Children's Hospital, Stanford, Palo Alto, CA

== Awards ==
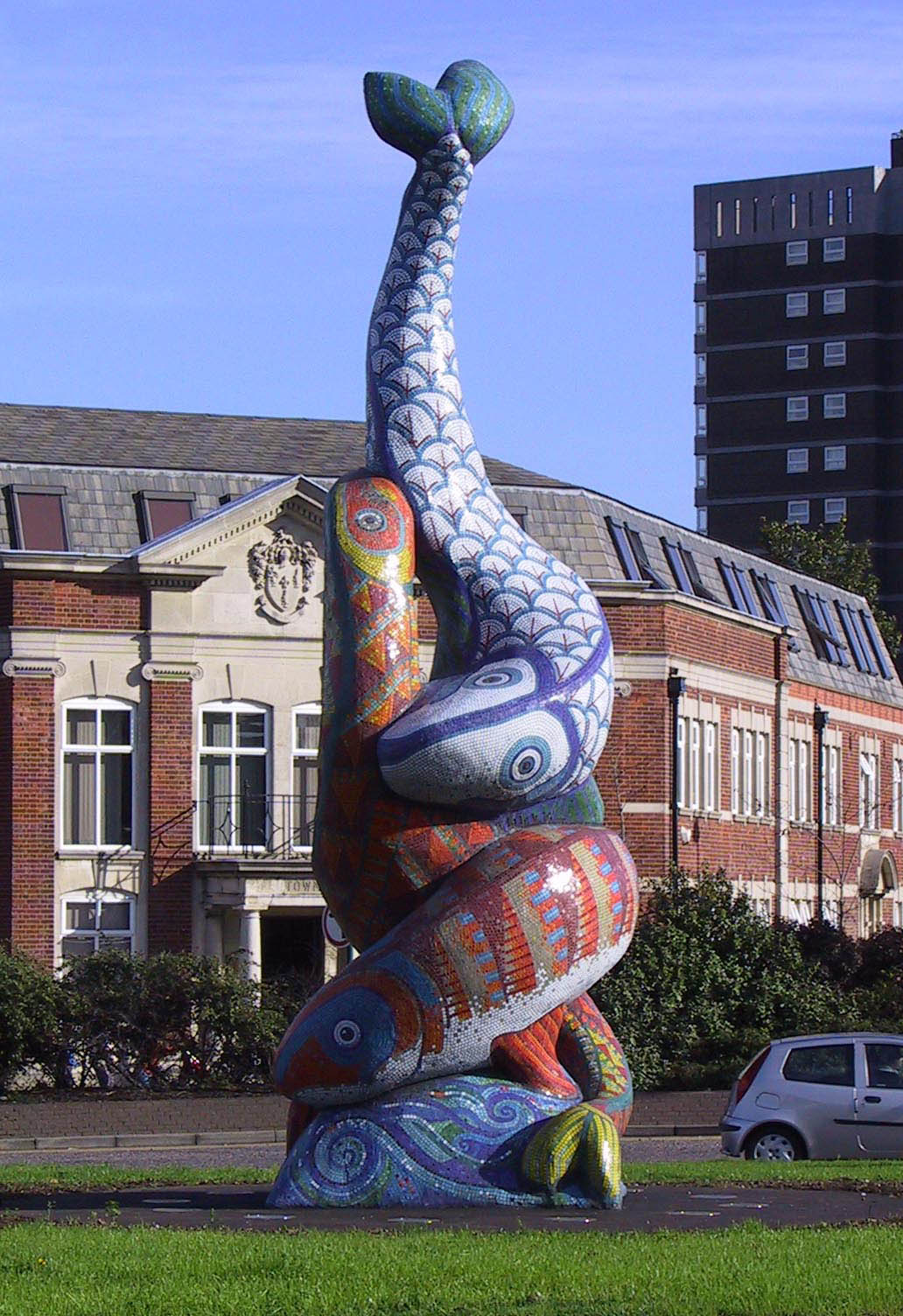
The De Luci Fish mosaic sculpture Erith roundabout, Kent, UK by Gary Drostle. Rouse Kent Award 2007

- (2006) The Queen Elizabeth Scholarship Award for craft excellence and development, Queen Elizabeth Scholarship Trust
- (2007) The Rouse Kent Award for Public Art, Awards for Public art in Kent: The Erith De Luci Fish Sculpture
- (2008) Mosaic Arts International, Miami 2008, Best Architectural Mosaic, Miami, FL.
- (2011) TileLetter Awards – Commercial Mosaic Installation Award, The National Tile Contractors Association (of America)
- (2013) Mosaic Arts International, Tacoma, Best in Show Award, The Museum of Glass, Tacoma, WA, USA.
- (2014) Mosaic Arts International, Houston, Contemporary Innovation Award, The Williams Tower Gallery, Houston, TX, USA
- (2014) Prix Picassiette – Award Prize, Recontres Internationales de Mosaîque, Chartres, France
- (2019) 5th Annual FCI Awards, Winner in the Commercial Tile and Stone installation category.

== Publications ==
- 'A Celebration of British Craftsmanship' - by Karen Bennett, Impress Publishing 2018 ISBN 978-1-9997825-8-0
- 'Andamento', vol 13 2019 - Journal of Contemporary Mosaic published by the British Association for Modern Mosaic - ISSN 1752-5578 - 'Away from the Gallery - Gary Drostle, large scale mosaics' by Helen Miles.
- 'Groutline' Fall 2018, vol.19 No.4, Journal of the Society of American Mosaic Artists, 'Creating California in a London Studio' article by Shawn Newton.
- 'Mosaïque Magazine', July 2016 vol 12 ISSN 2114-2793 - 'The large-scale mosaics of Gary Drostle' by Renée Malaval.
- 'Masters of Mosaic' by Oliver Budd, 2014 The Crowood Press Ltd ISBN 9780719806698.
- 'Mosaic Art Today' by Jeffrey B. Snyder, Schiffer Press 2012, ISBN 978-0-7643-4001-7

== See also ==
- Mosaic Art Now article on the creation of the River of Life Mosaic for the University of Iowa
- Sutton twin towns mural
