= St Francis of Assisi Church, Handsworth =

Coordinates: 52.498521°N 1.915880°W

St Francis of Assisi Church
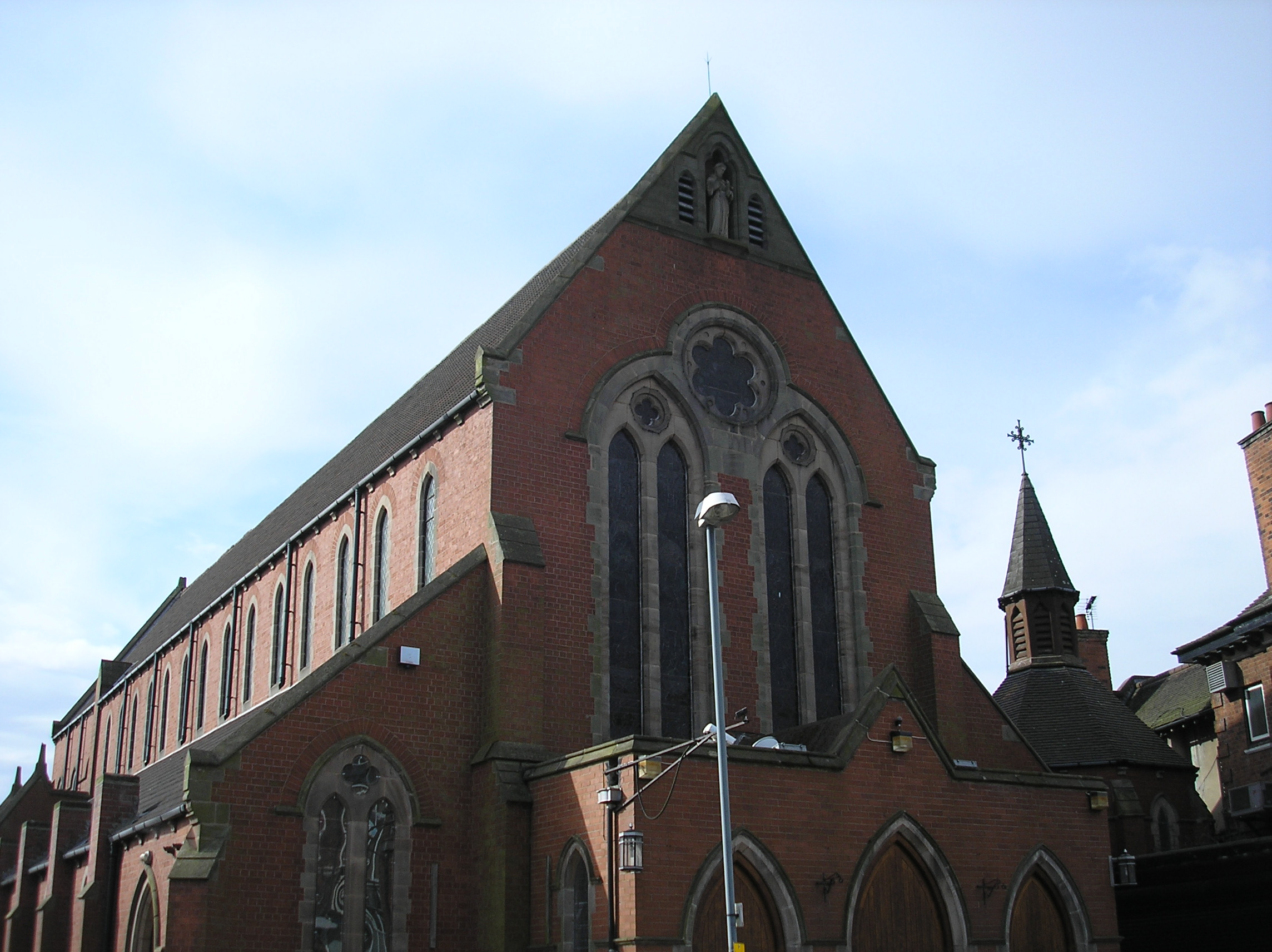

- Location within West Midlands county
- OS grid reference: SP0581388903
- Location: Lozells, Birmingham
- Country: England
- Denomination: Roman Catholic

History
- Former name: St Mary's Church
- Status: Active
- Founded: 1840
- Dedication: St. Francis of Assisi
- Consecrated: 21 June 1900

Architecture
- Functional status: Parish church
- Architect: Canon Alexander Scoles
- Style: Gothic Revival
- Groundbreaking: May 1893
- Completed: 2 February 1894
- Construction cost: £9000

Administration
- Province: Birmingham
- Archdiocese: Birmingham
- Deanery: Birmingham (Cathedral)

Clergy
- Archbishop: Most Rev. Bernard Longley
- Priest: Fr Gerard Kelly

St Francis of Assisi Church is a Roman Catholic Parish church in Birmingham. While the church is located between the Lozells and Hockley parts of the city, the parish covers most of Handsworth. It was founded in 1840, originally as a chapel in the nearby listed building, St. Mary's Convent designed by Augustus Pugin.

== History ==
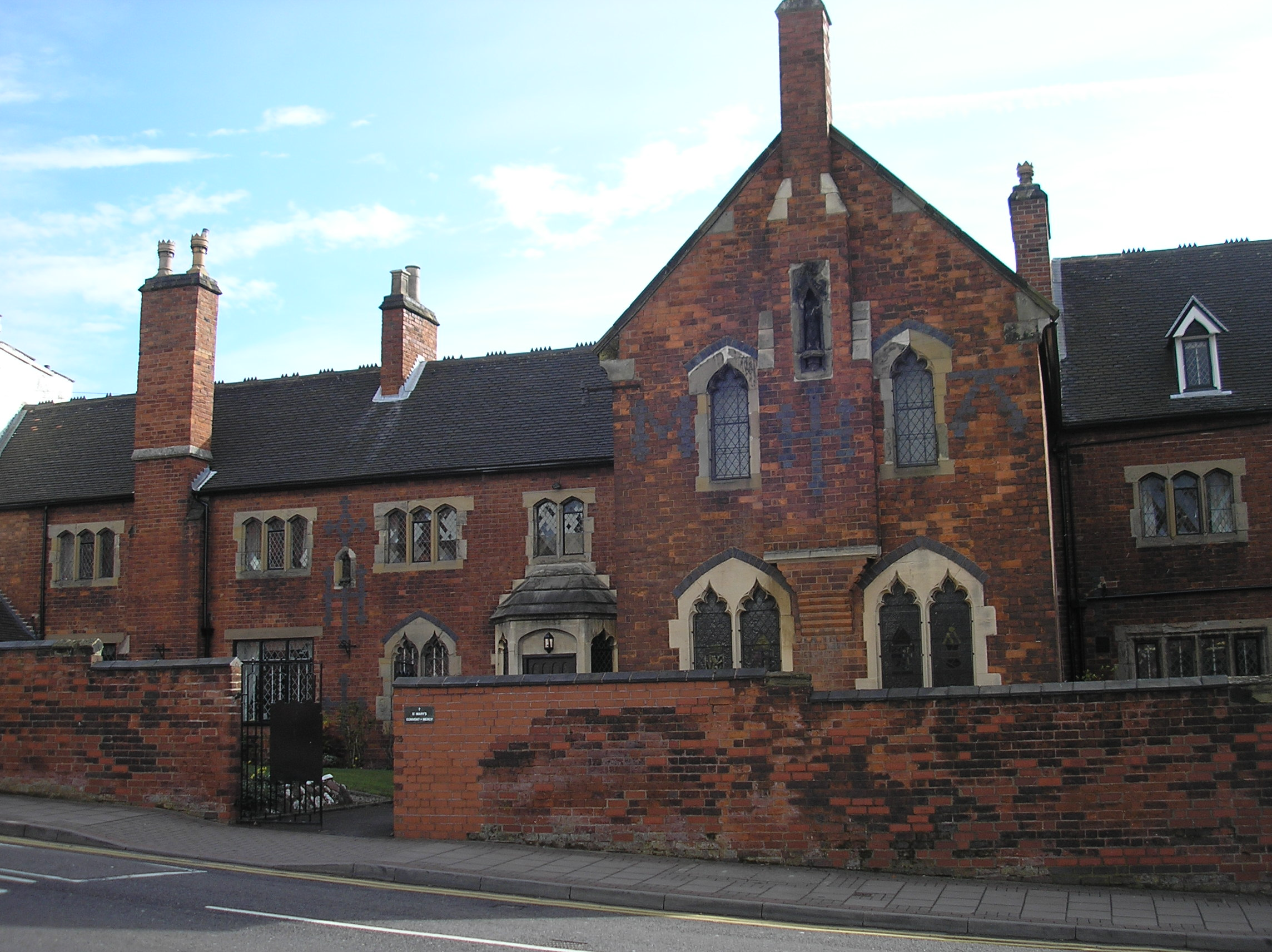
St Mary's Convent which previously housed the parish church

=== Convent of Our Lady of Mercy ===
In 1840, Nicholas Wiseman, as coadjutor bishop of Thomas Walsh, the Vicar Apostolic of the Midland District, invited the Sisters of Mercy to Birmingham. The sisters set up a convent on a piece of land given to them by John Hardman of Hardman & Co. who lived opposite. He promised to bear all the expenses of creating a convent, and helped by an endowment of £2000 from the Earl of Shrewsbury he commissioned Augustus Pugin to design the building for them. The chapel of the convent, dedicated to Saint Mary served as the parish church until 1847.

=== St Mary's Church ===
In 1845, with the local Catholic population increasing, it was decided that a larger church would have to be built. So building work started on a separate church that was located next door to the convent. In July 1847, St Mary's Church was opened and consecrated by Bishop William Wareing. In 1882, a new priest, Fr Francis Hopkins joined the parish. He saw that the new church could not accommodate the increasingly numerous congregation, so he made it his priority to start the construction of a new church.

=== St Francis of Assisi Church ===
Land for the new church was bought from the Hardman family opposite the convent and the Hardman family house became the presbytery of the new church. The architect chosen to design the church was Canon Alexander Scoles. He was a priest from the Diocese of Clifton and came from a family of architects. His father was Joseph John Scoles, who designed the Church of the Immaculate Conception in Farm Street, London and his brother was Ignatius Scoles who designed St Wilfrid's Church in Preston, Lancashire. Four years later, Canon Scoles went on to design Our Lady of Loreto and St Winefride's Church in Kew, London.

The foundation stone of St Francis' church was laid in May 1893 by Bishop Edward Ilsley. The church was completed a year later and was opened by Cardinal Herbert Vaughan on 2 February 1894. When the debt from the cost of the building, £9000 was paid off five years later, the church was consecrated on 21 June 1900.

== Interior ==
With the Hardman family being so prominent in the founding and construction of the church, it is unsurprising that a lot of the interior work was done by Hardman & Co. All of the stained glass windows were made by the company. One window depicting the Annunciation adjacent to the Lady chapel was designed by William John Wainwright and then built by Hardman & Co. The altar and reredos was made from a drawing done by the architect, Alexander Scoles.

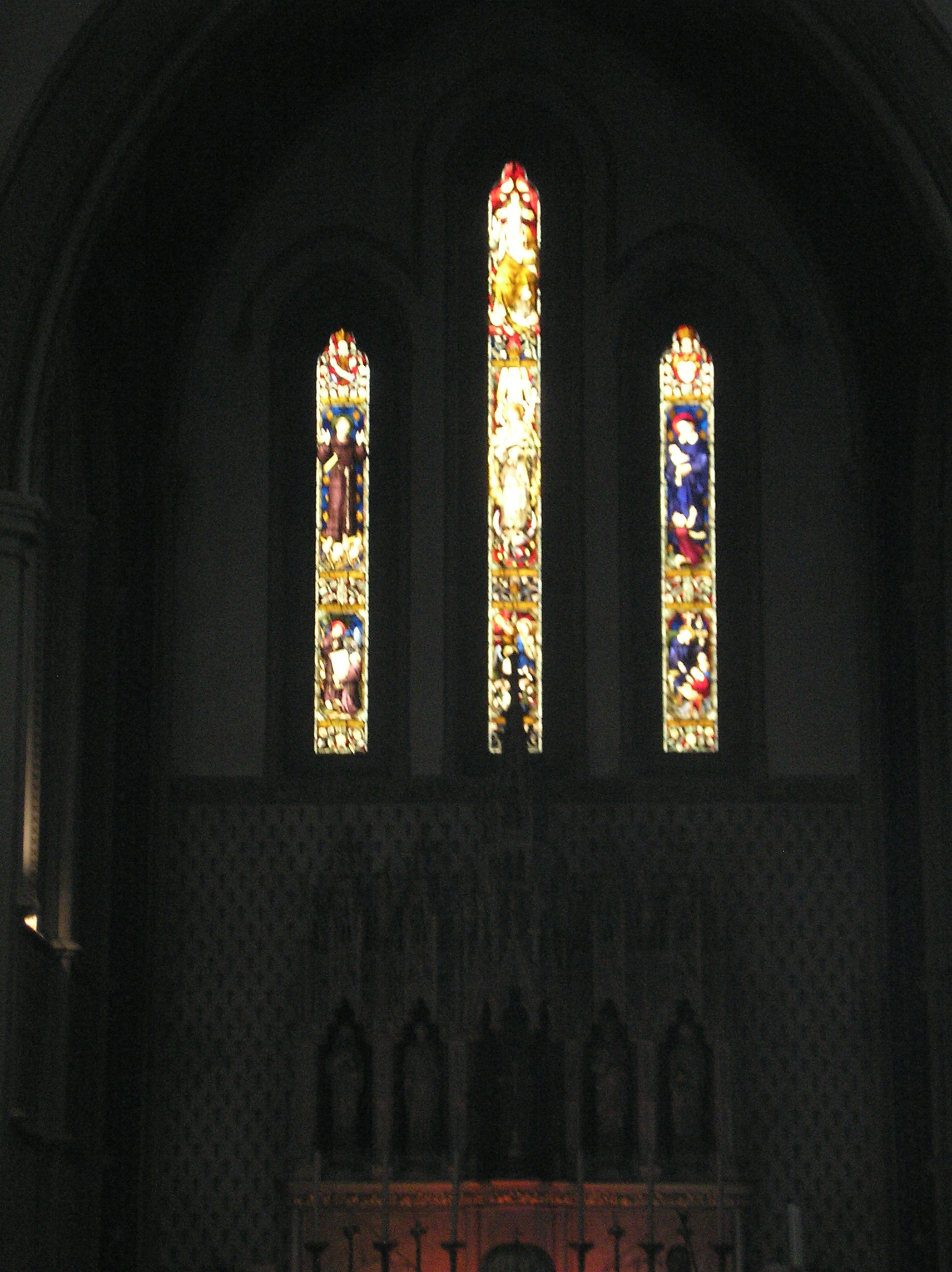
Church sanctuary

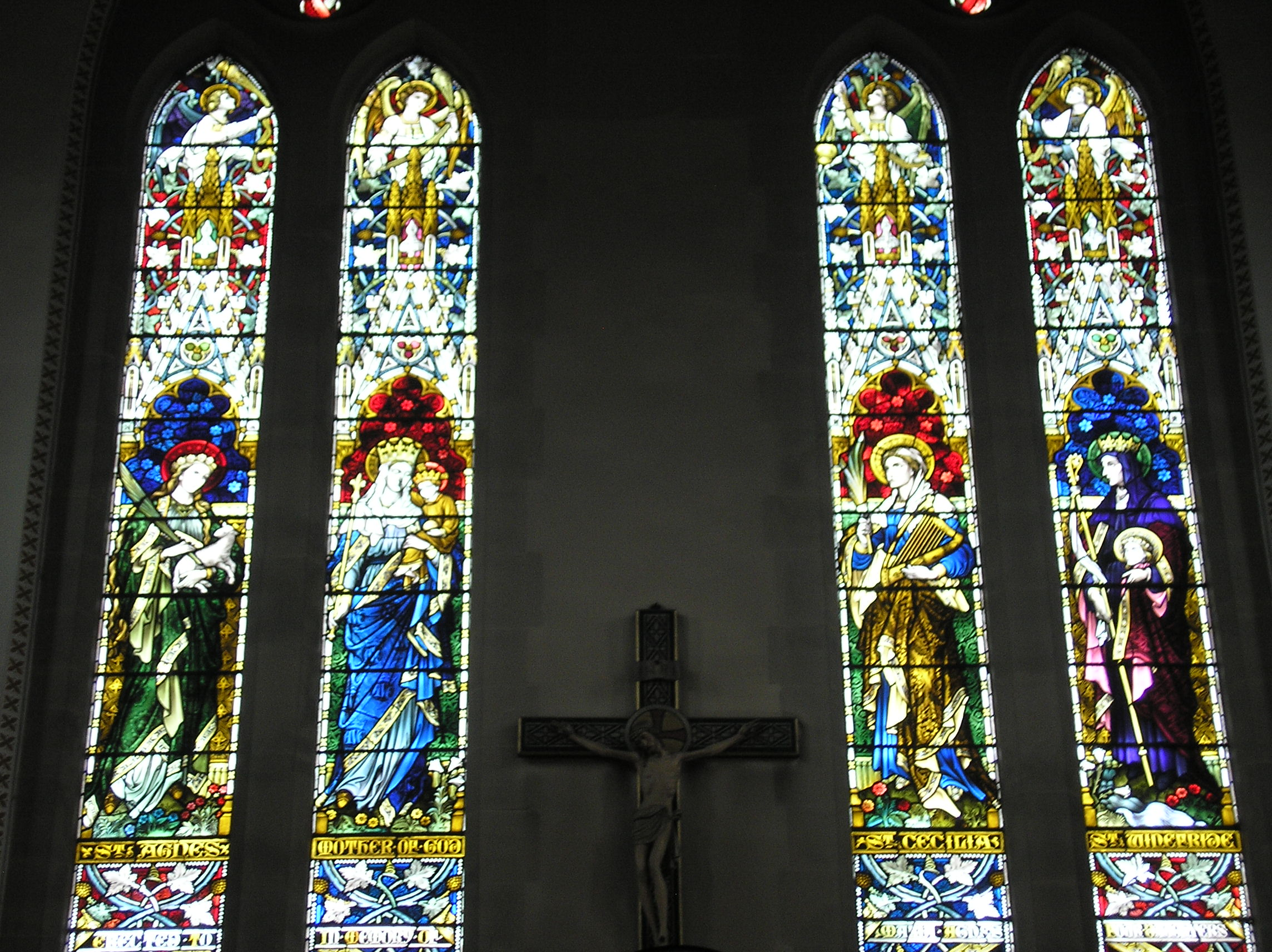
Nave window

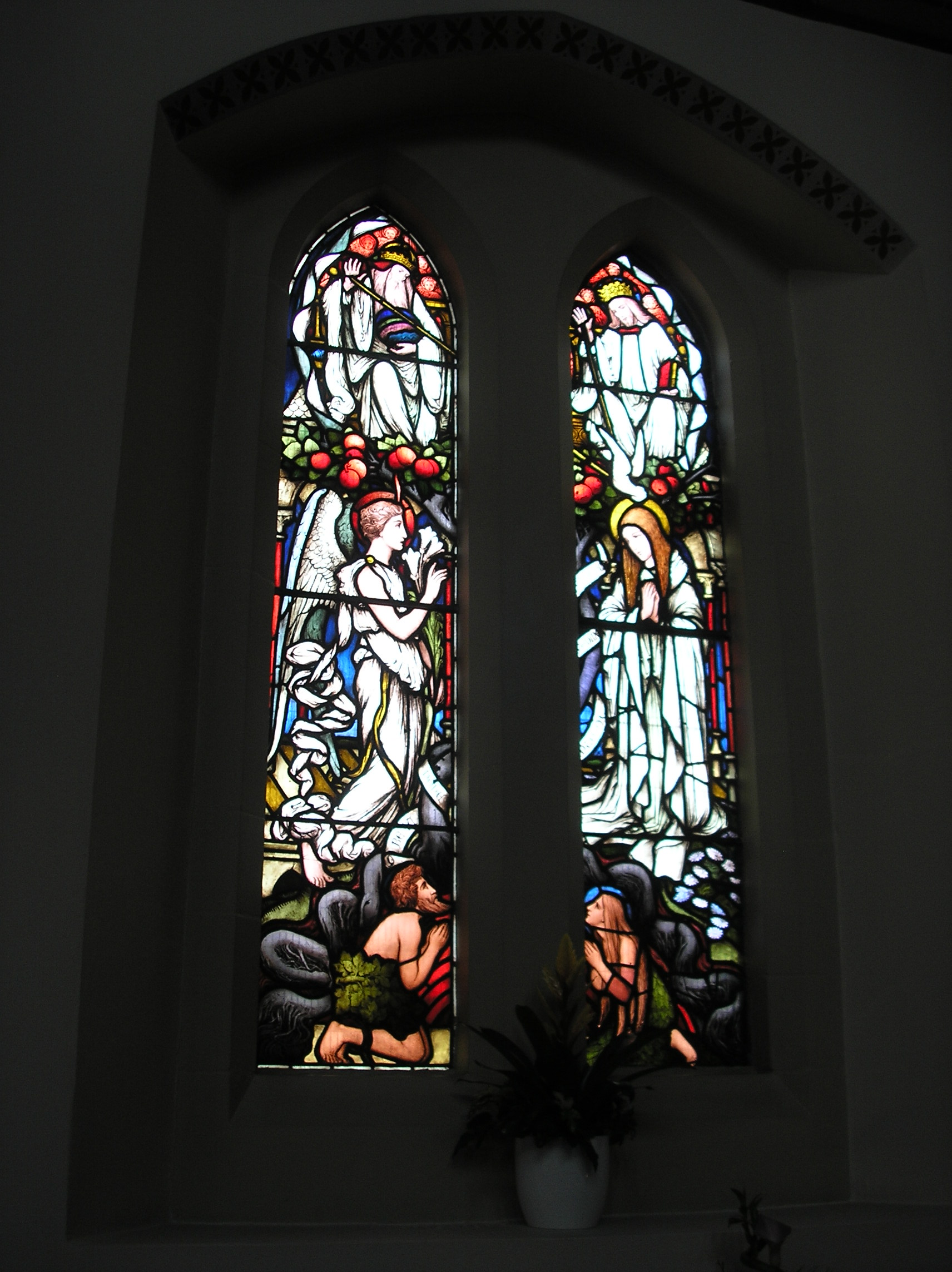
Annunciation window by William John Wainwright

== Parish ==
Next door to the church is the St Francis Centre, it is social centre that was built in 1909 by the then parish priest, Monsignor John O'Hanlon to the designs of the architect George Bernard Cox. It houses a large hall, a stage, kitchen and offices.

The church was refurbished in the 1980s by Monsignor Thomas Fallon. It meant that the sanctuary was changed, bringing it in line with the decrees of the Second Vatican Council.

The church has five Masses for Sundays. There's a Mass at 7pm on Saturday, 9:30 and 11:30 on Sunday morning, a Vietnamese language Mass at 1:30pm and a Sunday evening Mass at 6.30pm. The church also has weekday morning Masses at 9:15am. There is an adoration chapel next door to the church that can also be used for prayer.

The site of the old St Mary's church is now occupied by St Francis Catholic Primary School. The school has a close relationship with the parish and the Sisters of Mercy next door who each have a representative on the school's board of governors.

As well as the Sisters of Mercy, other Catholic religious orders also work in the parish. The Missionary Sisters of St. Columban, the Missionary Sisters Servants of the Holy Spirit, the Missionaries of Charity and the Dominican Sisters of St Rose of Lima all help pastorally in the area with the congregation.

== Exterior ==
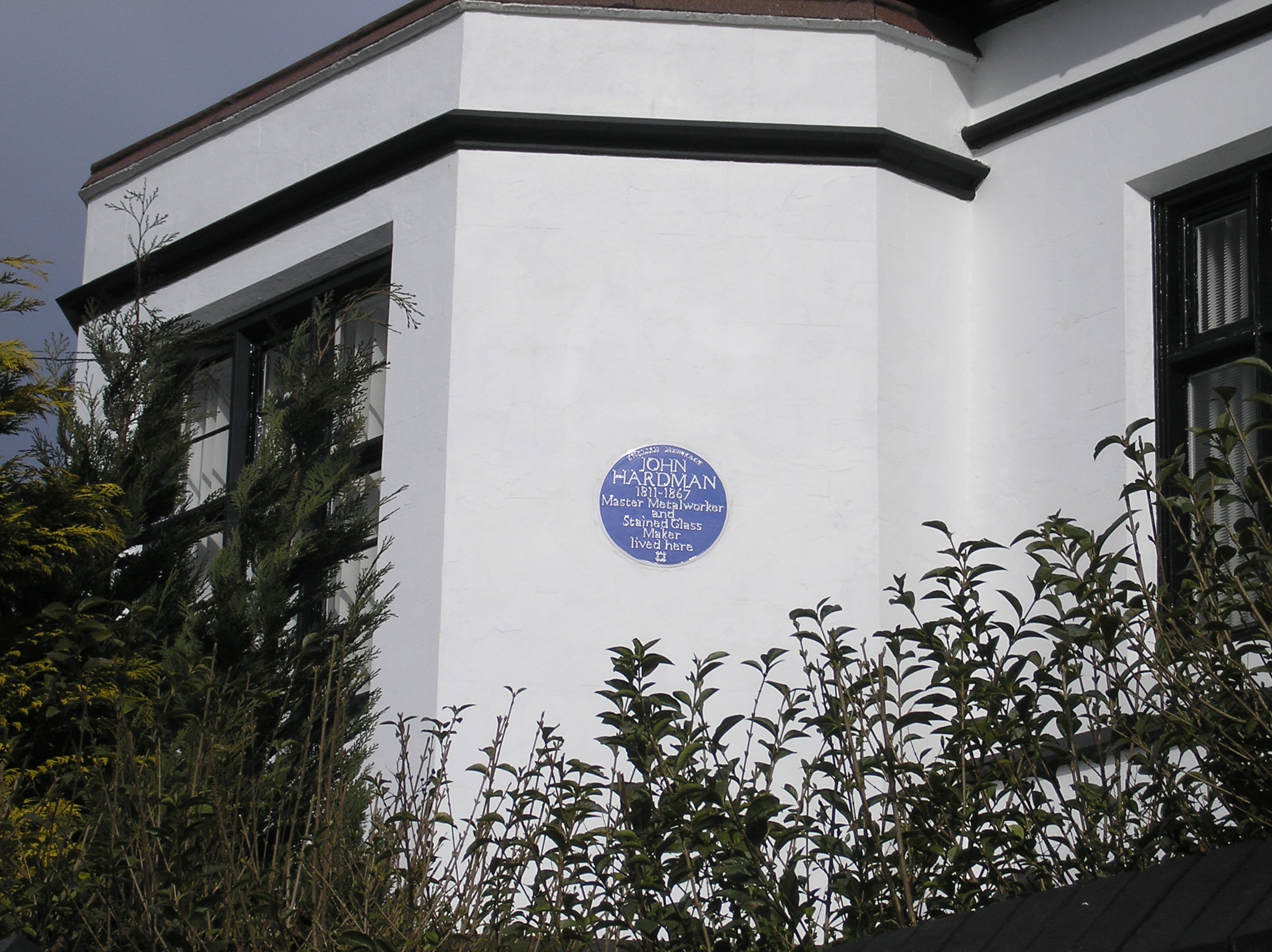
Presbytery with blue plaque of John Hardman

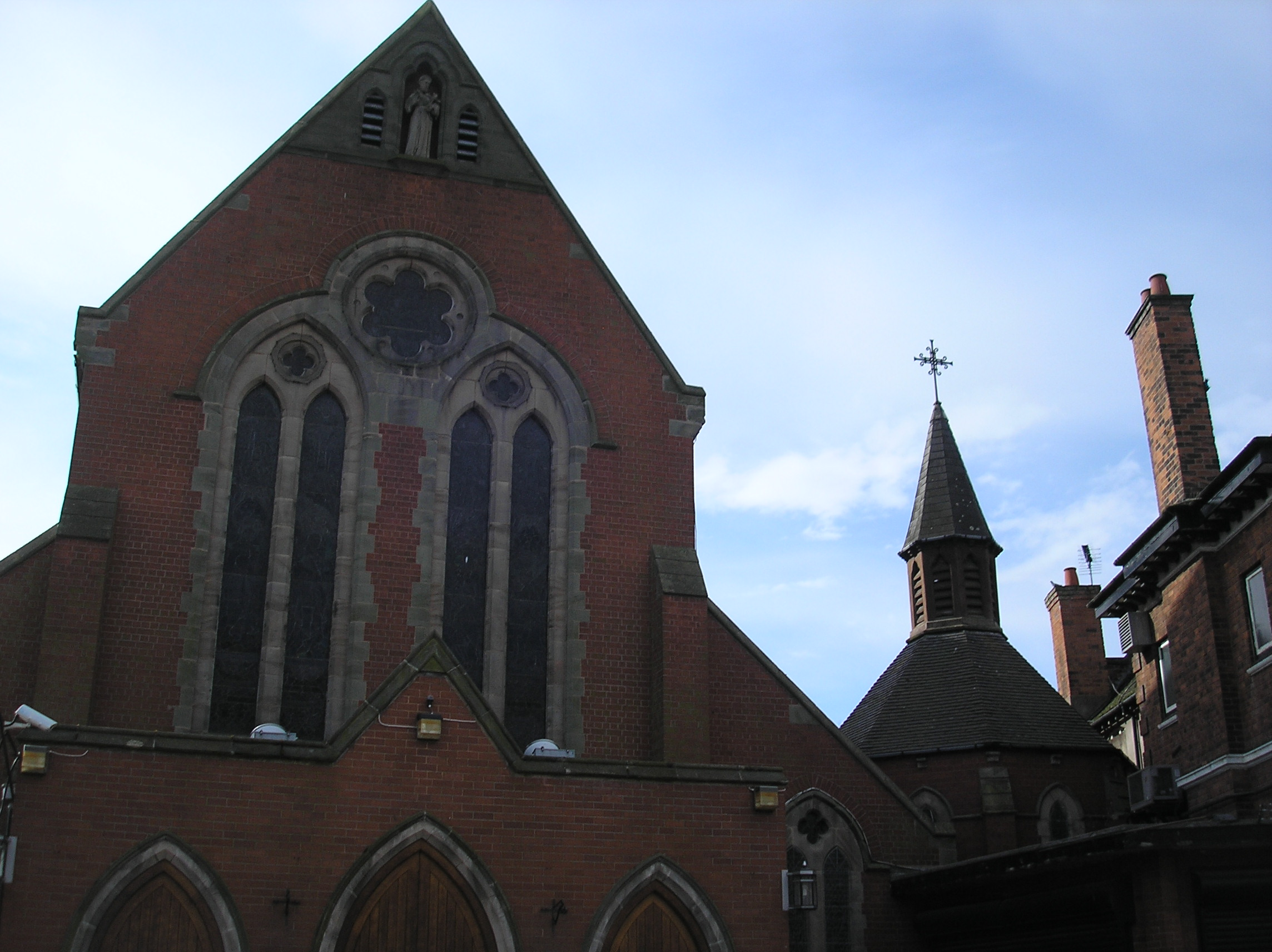
Front entrance

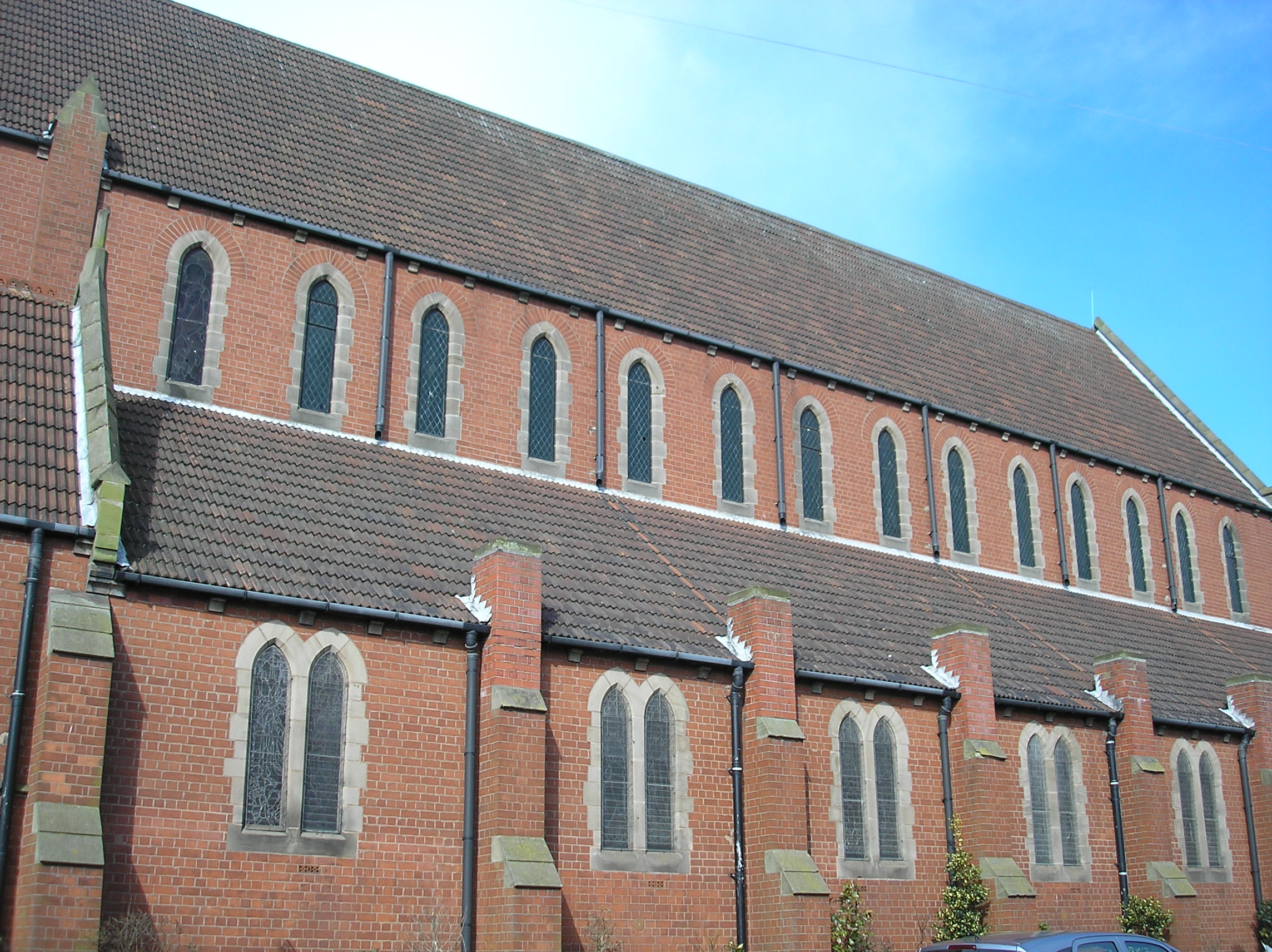
East side of church

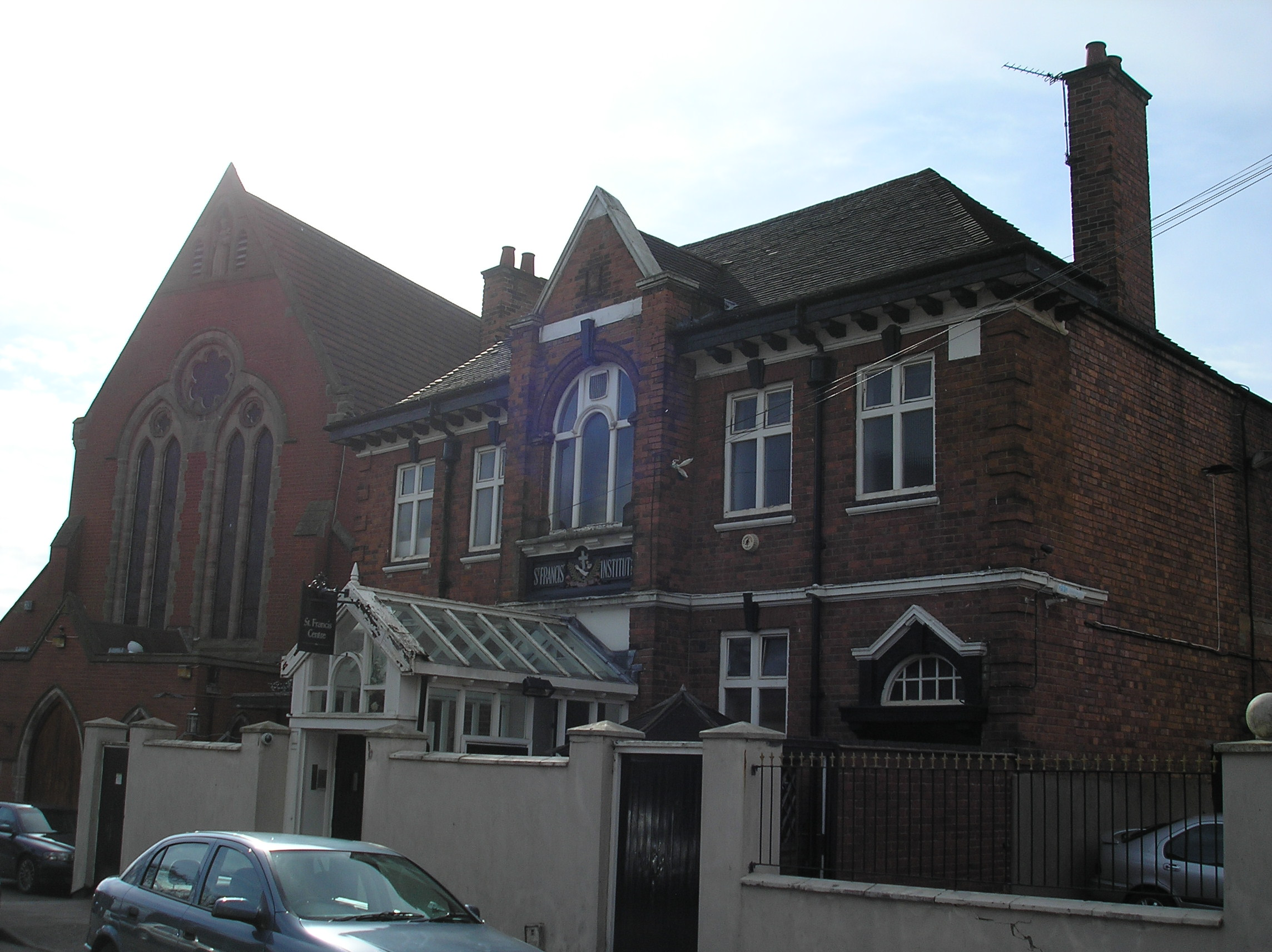
St Francis Centre

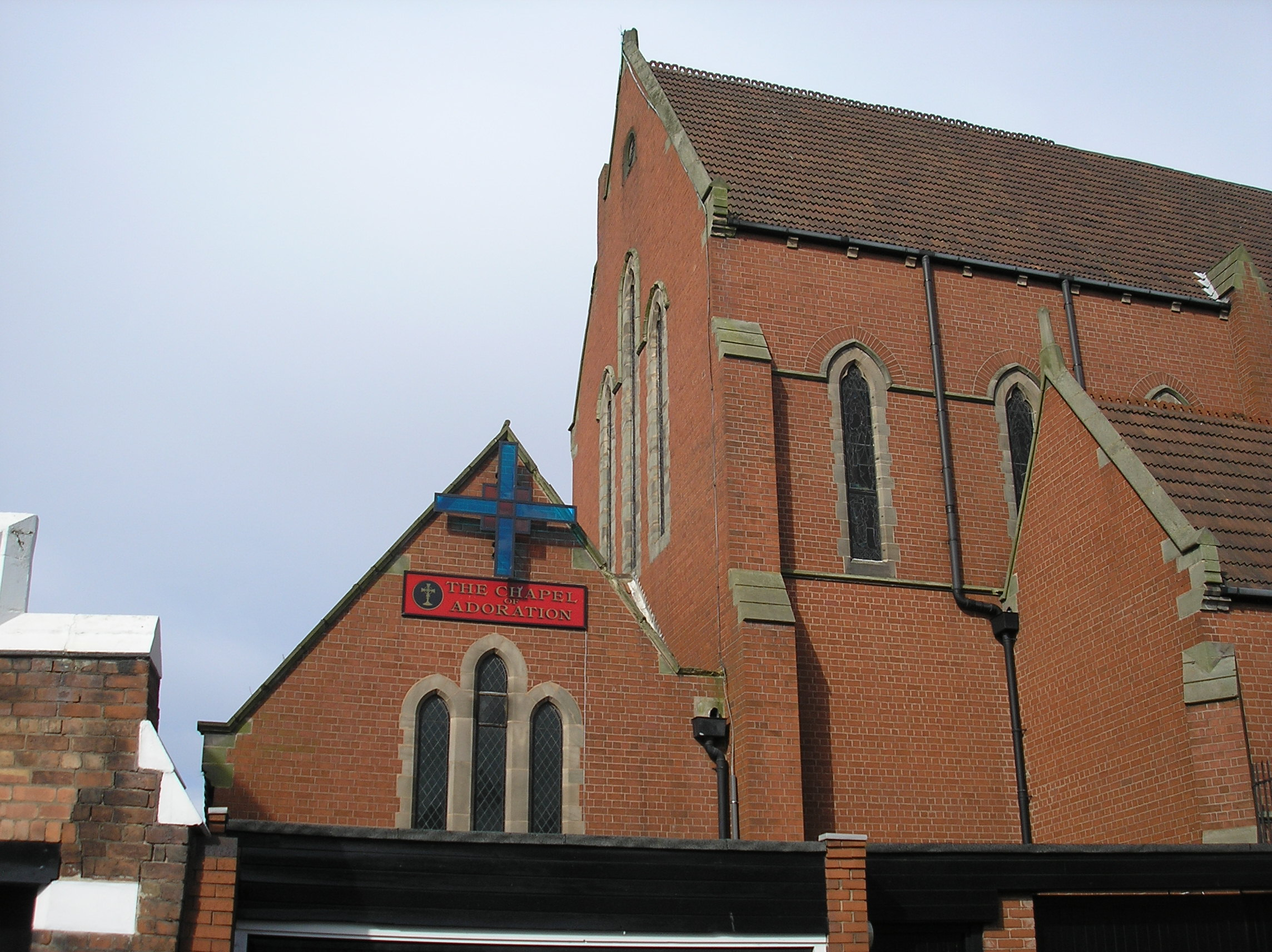
Adoration Chapel

== See also ==
- Lozells
- Handsworth
- Archdiocese of Birmingham
