= St Mary's Convent, Handsworth =

Building in Birmingham, England

St Mary's Convent
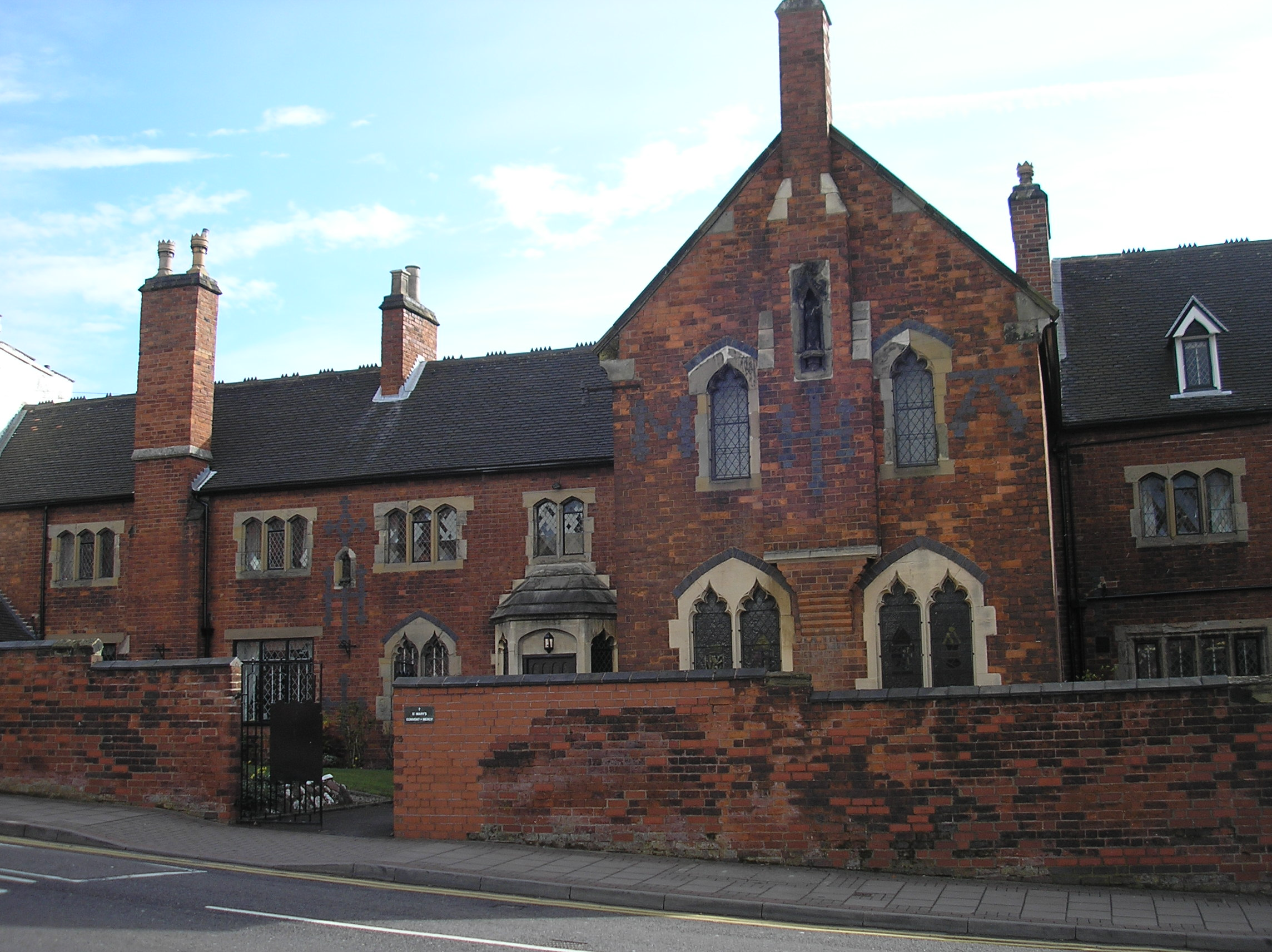
- St Mary's Convent entrance

- Location within West Midlands county
- Interactive map of St Mary's Convent

Monastery information
- Full name: St Mary's Convent, Sisters of Mercy, Handsworth
- Order: Sisters of Mercy
- Established: 1840
- Dedication: Blessed Virgin Mary
- Diocese: Birmingham

People
- Important associated figures: John Hardman

Architecture
- Heritage designation: Grade II* listed
- Architect: Augustus Pugin

Site
- Location: Lozells, Birmingham, England
- Coordinates: 52.4980°N 1.9150°W
- Grid reference: SP0586488903
- Public access: Yes

St Mary's Convent is a house for the community of the local Sisters of Mercy in Birmingham. Although it is situated between the Lozells and Hockley parts of the city, the community also serves the parish in Handsworth. It was founded in 1840 and was designed by Augustus Pugin. On 25 April 1952 it was designated as a Grade II* listed building by English Heritage.

== History ==
=== Foundation ===
In 1840, the Sisters of Mercy came to Birmingham at the invitation of Nicholas Wiseman. At the time he was coadjutor bishop of Thomas Walsh, the Vicar Apostolic of the Midland District.

They set up a convent with the help of many interested parties. John Hardman of Hardman & Co. who lived opposite donated the land for them. The cost of building the convent was met by Hardman and the Earl of Shrewsbury who donated £2000. They then commissioned Augustus Pugin to design the building for them.

The chapel of the convent, dedicated to Saint Mary served as the parish church until 1847.

=== St Mary's Church ===
In 1845, with the local Catholic population increasing, the convent chapel was no longer large enough to accommodate the congregation. So they decided to build a larger church next to the convent.

In July 1847, St Mary's Church was opened and consecrated by Bishop William Wareing. After St Francis of Assisi Church was built opposite the convent in 1894, St Mary's Church became the convent chapel.

However, St Mary's Church was destroyed during World War II and not rebuilt. The site of the church is now occupied by St Francis Catholic Primary School. The school has a close relationship with the convent next door who have a representative on the school's board of governors.

== Exterior ==
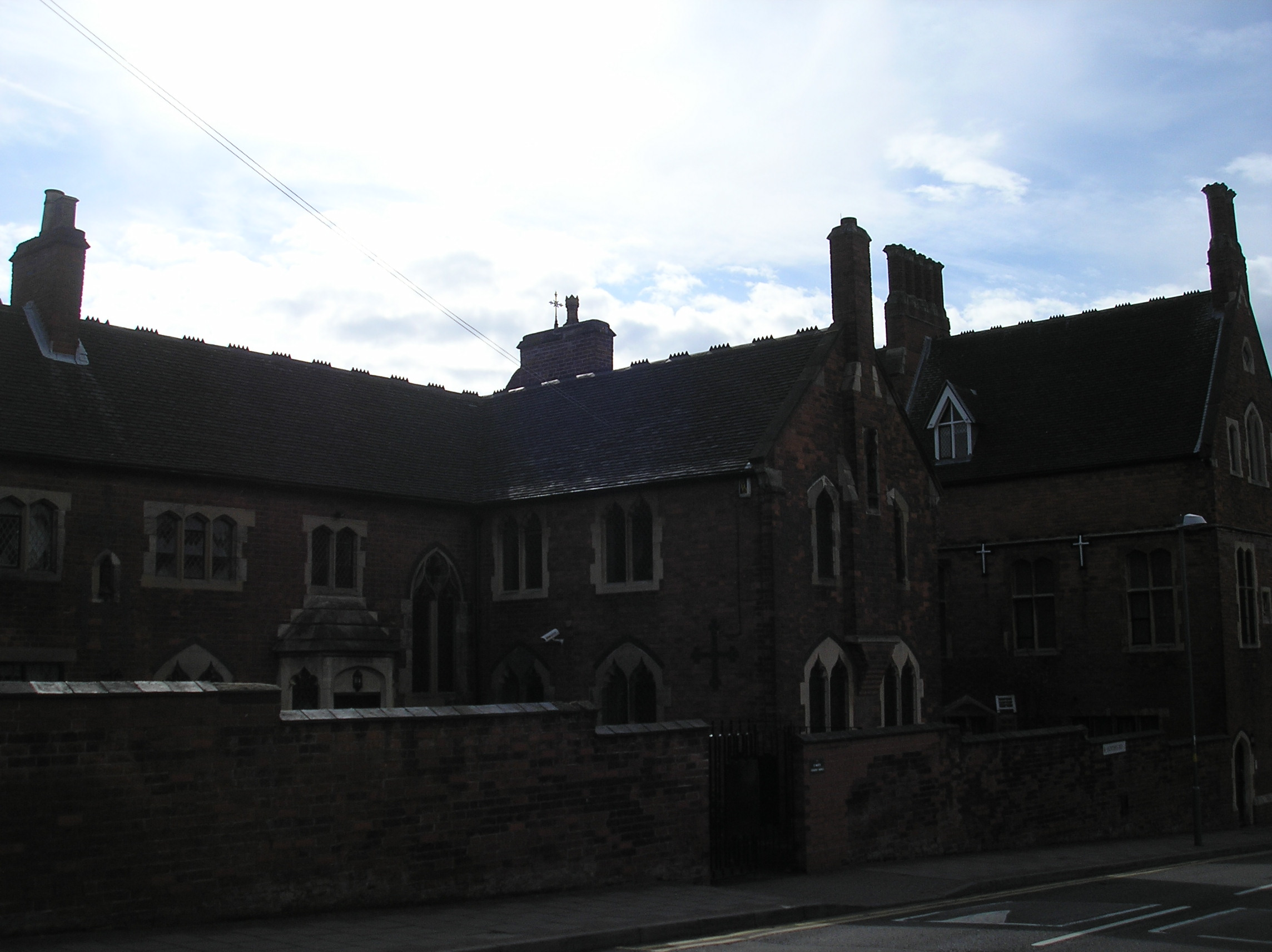
View along Hunters Road

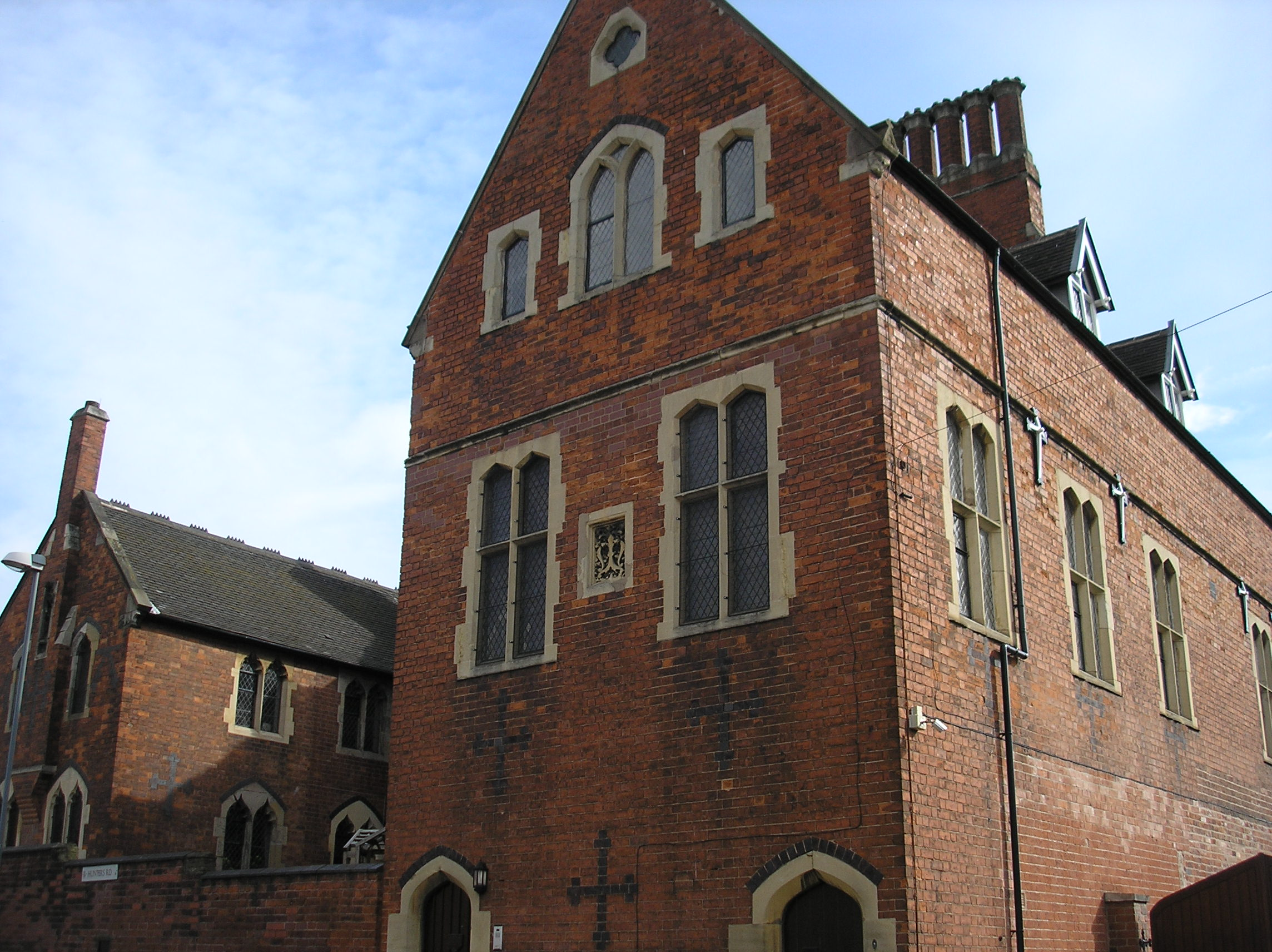
Side of the convent

== See also ==
- St Francis of Assisi Church, Handsworth
