= Immaculate Conception Church, Clevedon =

Immaculate Conception Church
- Church of the Immaculate Conception of Mary
- Clevedon Friary
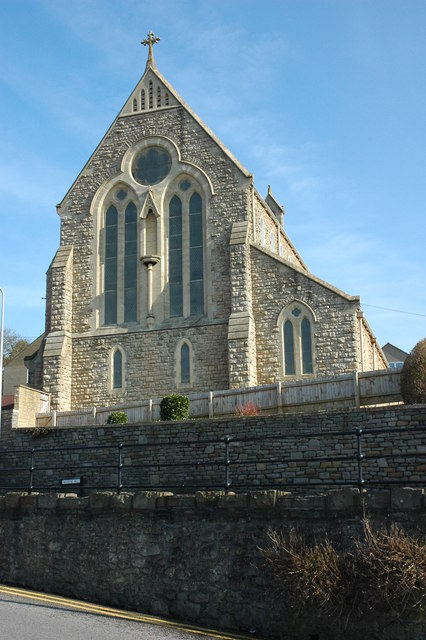

- Location within Somerset Location within England
- 51.444298°N 2.859930°W
- Location: Clevedon, Somerset
- Country: England
- Denomination: Roman Catholic
- Religious institute: Order of Friars Minor
- Website: ClevedonCatholics.org.uk

History
- Founded: 1882
- Dedication: Immaculate Conception

Architecture
- Functional status: Active
- Architect: Alexander Scoles
- Style: Gothic Revival
- Groundbreaking: 16 February 1886
- Completed: 14 July 1887
- Construction cost: £3,800

Administration
- Province: Birmingham
- Diocese: Clifton
- Deanery: St Alexander Briant
- Parish: Clevedon

Immaculate Conception Church, also known as the Church of the Immaculate Conception of Mary, is a Roman Catholic parish church in Clevedon, Somerset. It was built from 1886 to 1887 and was designed by Alexander Scoles, an architect and priest who worked in Somerset. It is located on the intersection between Marine Parade, Marine Hill and Wellington Terrace, overlooking the Severn Estuary. It was founded by the Franciscan Order of Friars Minor who continue to serve the parish.

== History ==
=== Foundation ===
In 1880, a group of French Franciscan friars minor came to Somerset. The Bishop of Clifton William Clifford and the abbess of St Joseph's Convent, Taunton suggested that the Franciscans go to Clevedon. In 1882, the Franciscans started a mission serving the local Catholic community there. The Royal Hotel in Clevedon was bought and it became a friary. In February 1883, the first Mass was held there.

=== Construction ===
Designs for the church were made by Alexander Scoles, he was an architect and son of Joseph John Scoles, and a Catholic priest in Bridgwater. On 16 February 1886, the foundation stone was laid. On 14 July 1887, the church was both opened and consecrated. The church cost £3,800. In 1902, the English Franciscans came to serve the church.

=== Developments ===
Over the years, various alterations were made to the church and the friary. In 1907, the rood was lowered. In 1980, a new porch was built. From 1924 to 1925, the former hotel was refurbished and new benches were installed in the church. In 1927, the rood was removed. In 1929, the font was installed. In 1967, a new altar was installed. In 1972, the pulpit and two side altars were removed. In 1977–8, the old hotel was sold and a new friary was built to the south of the church. In 1990, some new benches from Gorton Monastery were added. In 2000, the porch was demolished. From 2002 to 2003, a new parish hall, called Greyfriars Hall, was built to the north of the church.

On 25 October 2020, a white statue of Saint Mary was added to empty niche at the front of the church, facing the sea.

== Parish ==
The parish itself includes Clevedon, Yatton, Wrington, Claverham and Congresbury. In Yatton is St Dunstan and St Antony Church, which is also served by the friars. There are two Sunday Masses in Immaculate Conception Church at 6:30pm on Saturday and at 10:00am on Sunday and weekday Masses at 10:00am. At St Dunstan and St Antony Church in Yatton there is a Sunday Mass at 8:30am.

== See also ==
- Diocese of Clifton
