= Alexander Scoles =

British architect and priest (1844–1920)

- Born: 30 November 1844; Hammersmith, London
- Died: 29 December 1920 (aged 76)
- Occupation: architect
- Father: Joseph John Scoles

Alexander Joseph Cory Scoles (30 November 1844 – 29 December 1920) was an architect who designed many lancet style Gothic Revival churches in the south of England, and a Roman Catholic priest. He was the son of Joseph John Scoles, and brother of Ignatius Scoles.

== Life ==
Alexander Scoles, like his brother Ignatius Scoles, was born in Hammersmith, London. He was the third son of the architect Joseph John Scoles, whose works included the Roman Catholic churches of the Immaculate Conception in Farm Street, London, Saint Francis Xavier in Liverpool and St Ignatius in Preston, Lancashire.

His eldest brother, Ignatius, became a Catholic, joining the Jesuits on 9 October 1860. Alexander Scoles followed him into the Catholic church, becoming a priest in the Diocese of Clifton, later becoming a canon.

He studied as an architect under the direction of his father, until the latter's death in 1863. Scoles then became a pupil of Samuel Joseph Nicholl (1826–1903). His early professional work was done in partnership with his cousin John Myrie Cory (1846–1893).

Initially he was parish priest in Bridgwater and on 26 September 1891, he became parish priest of the Church of the Holy Ghost in Yeovil. He moved from Yeovil and the Diocese of Clifton in 1901 and became a parish priest in Basingstoke. He died in the Hospital of St John and St Elizabeth on 29 December 1920 in London, and is buried in the grounds of Holy Ghost Church in Basingstoke.

== Works ==
His works include:

- St Joseph's on the Quay, Bridgwater (1882)
- Immaculate Conception Church, Clevedon (1887)
- St Monica's Priory, Spetisbury (1891)
- Holy Ghost Church, Yeovil (1891)
- St Joseph's Church, Weston-super-Mare (1893) extended.
- Our Lady Star of the Sea Church, Ilfracombe (1893)
- St Francis of Assisi Church, Handsworth (1894)
- Sacred Heart and St Aldhelm Church, Sherborne
- St Peter-in-Chains Church, Stroud Green (1894)
- St Peter's Church, Cirencester (1895)
- St Thomas of Canterbury Church, Woodford Green (1895)
- St Francis Church, Ascot, Berkshire (1900)
- Holy Ghost Church, Basingstoke (1901)
- Holy Redeemer Church, Keyham, Devon
- Our Lady Help of Christians and St Helen's Church, Westcliff-on-Sea (1903)
- Holy Trinity Church, Newquay (1903)
- Holy Ghost and St Stephen Church, Shepherd's Bush, London (1903–04)
- Holy Spirit and St Edward Church, Swanage (1904)
- Cathedral of St John the Evangelist, Portsmouth (1906)
- St Joseph's Church, Brighton (1906)
- Our Lady of Loreto and St Winefride's Church, Kew (1906)
- Our Lady and St Michael Church, Dorchester, Dorset (1906–07)
- Holy Cross Church, Plymouth (1907)
- St Agatha Church, Dawlish (1907–09)
- Sacred Heart and St Ia Church, St Ives, Cornwall (1908)
- Our Lady of Lourdes with St Swithun Church, Southsea (1908)
- St Edward the Confessor Church, Plymouth (1910)
- Church of the Immaculate Conception, Liphook (1911)
- St James the Less and St Helen Church, Colchester, church hall (1911)
- Holy Ghost Church, Exmouth (1915)
- St Joseph Church, Newton Abbot (1915)

== Gallery ==
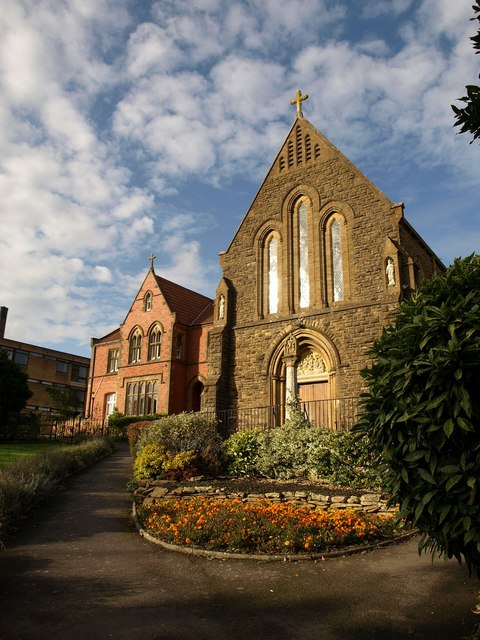
Church of the Holy Ghost, Yeovil

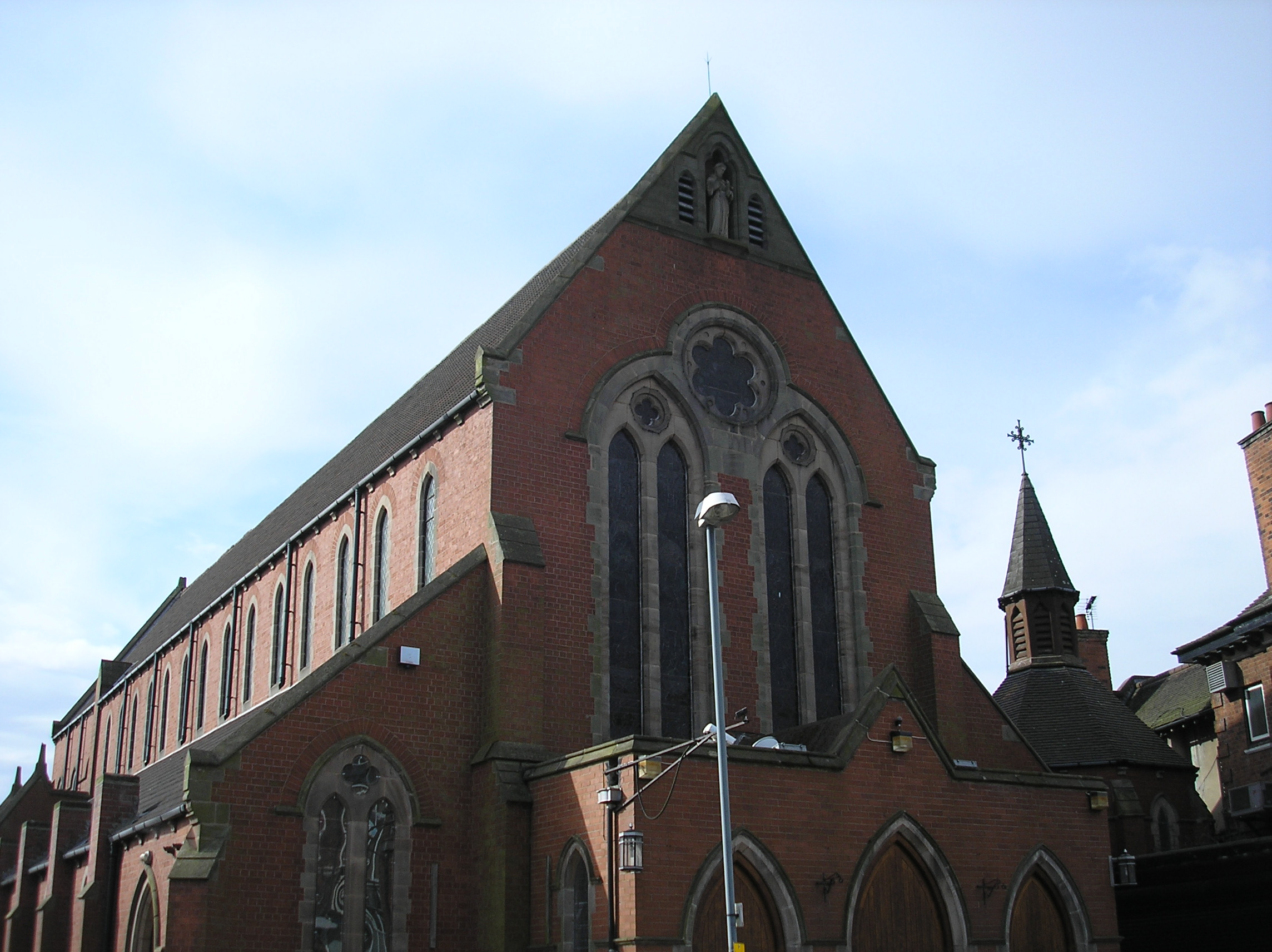
St Francis Church, Handsworth

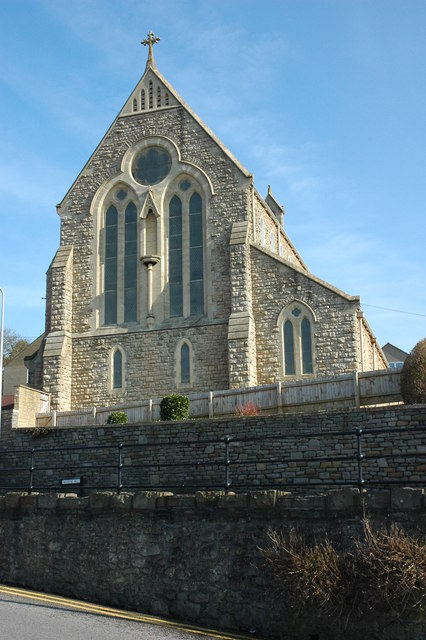
Immaculate Conception Church, Clevedon

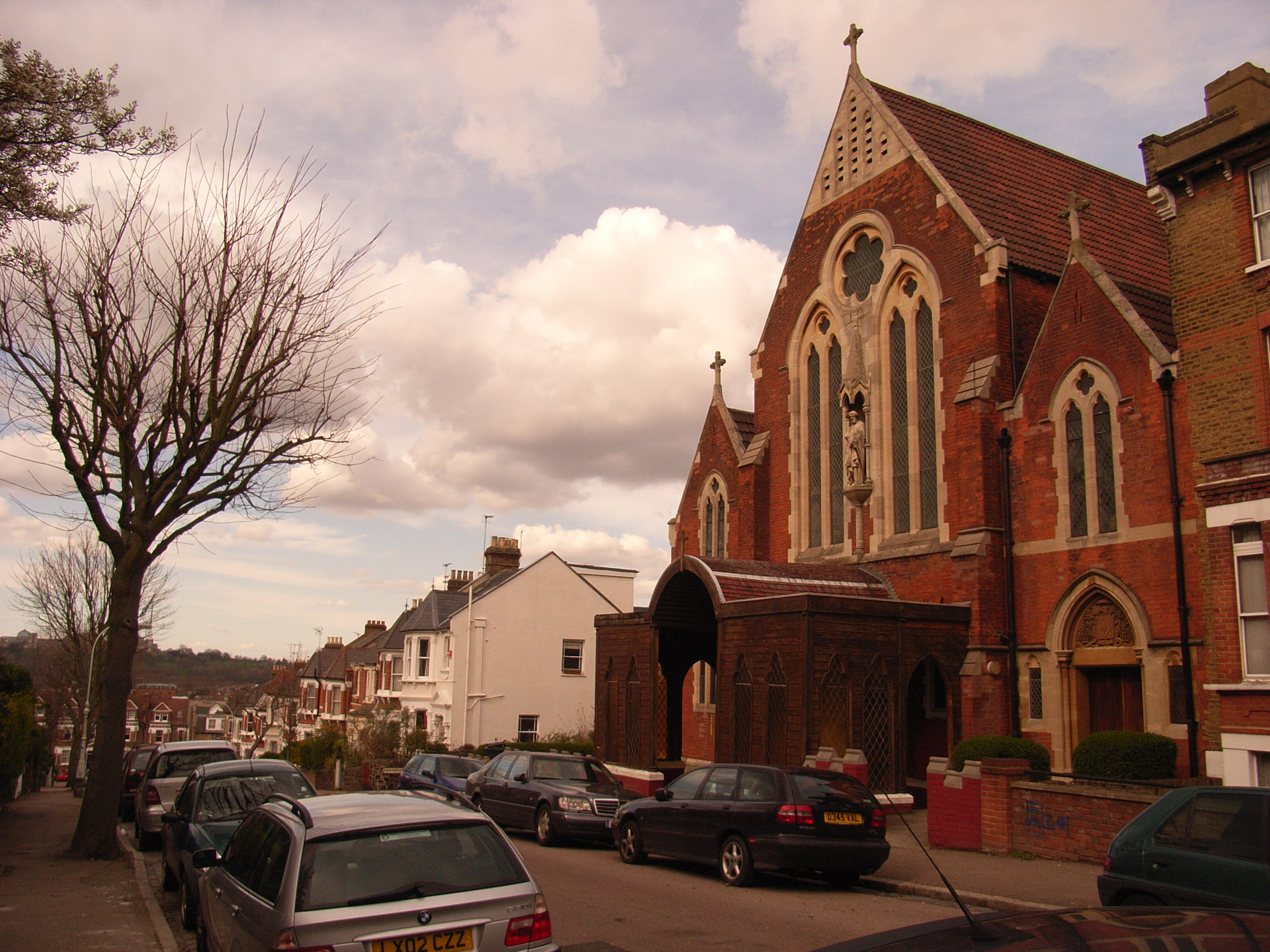
St Peter in Chains Church, Stroud Green

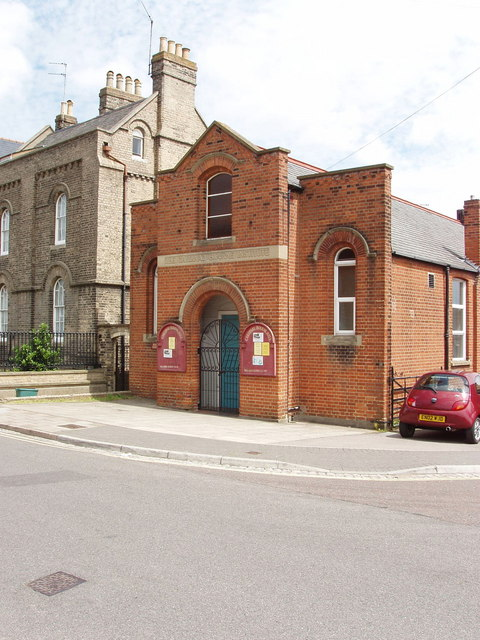
St James the Less and St Helen Church hall, Colchester

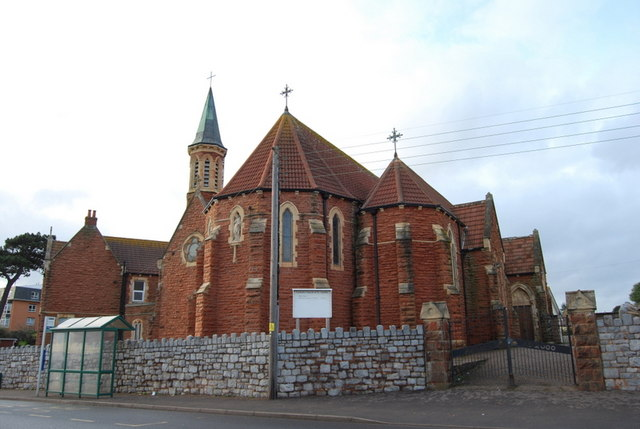
St Agatha Church, Dawlish

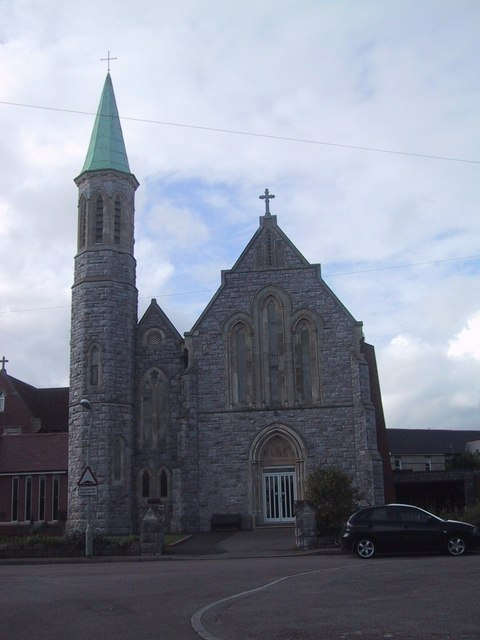
Holy Ghost Church, Exmouth

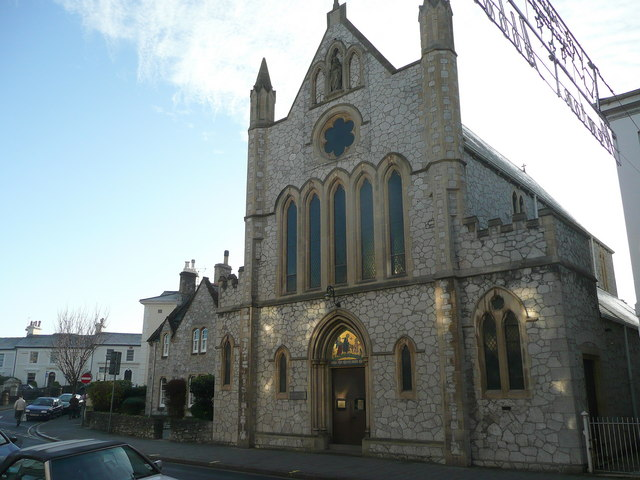
St Joseph Church, Newton Abbot

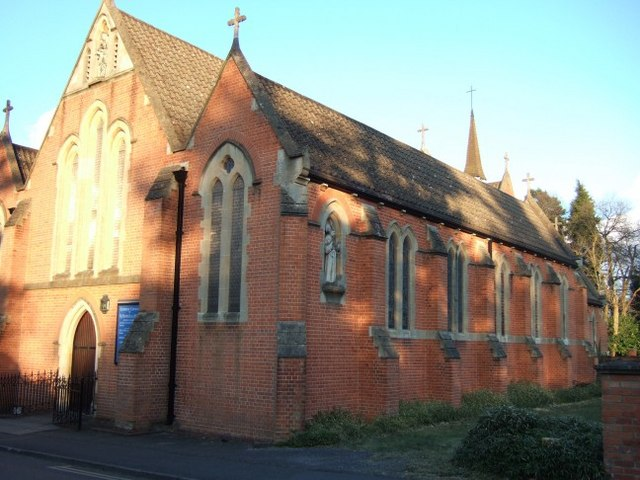
St Francis Church, Ascot

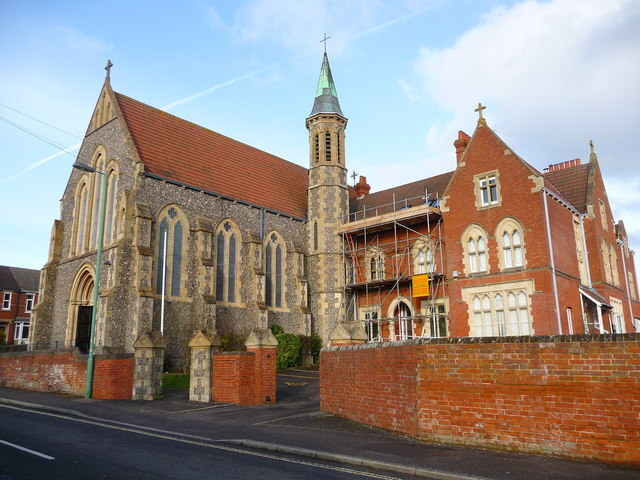
Holy Ghost Church, Basingstoke

== See also ==
- Joseph John Scoles
- Ignatius Scoles
