= Dorothy Liddell =

British archaeologist

Dorothy Liddell MBE
- Born: 1890; Benwell, Northumberland
- Died: 1938 (aged 47–48)
- Known for: Archaeology
- Notable work: Excavation of Hembury Fort

Dorothy Liddell, MBE (1890–1938) was a pioneering woman archaeologist and mentor to both Mary Leakey and Mary Eily de Putron.

== Early life ==
Born Dorothy Mary Liddell to Emily Catherine Berry and her husband John Liddell at Benwell, England in 1890. She was one of six children born to the couple. Her father was a prosperous director of the North British and Mercantile Insurance Company and a Justice of the Peace first for Northumberland and later for Basingstoke. There were three boys and three girls in the family. The family moved several times and by 1898 were living in Prudhoe Hall. In 1904 the family moved to Sydmonton Cork near Newbury and then later in 1908 to Sherfield Manor, Basingstoke. The family were philanthropic and interested in their community where ever they lived. They were a very close knit family. Liddell was known as Dolly and Tabitha to her family. Tabitha was a character she had performed to entertain the convalescent soldiers who stayed in Sherfield Manor when it was used as a hospital during the First World War. Liddell was a nurse in the hospital and after the death of her brother Aidan, a Victoria Cross recipient, and the closure of the hospital she joined the red cross in La Panne and worked there until the end of the war. She was awarded a M.B.E. for her service.

== Career ==
Liddell was raised with the typical education of the time, taught by governesses and tutors. She was able to perform well on the violin and was a debutante, presented at Court. Although she was a noted archaeologist, she had been unable to get a formal education in archaeology. However she went on to become a significant figure in British archaeology. She worked for the 1925-1929 Windmill Hill, Avebury excavations where she was the first to recognise the use of bird bones to decorate Neolithic pottery. This site had a significant influence on the perception of Neolithic life. Liddell discovered the young Leakey and worked with her initially for three summers and later trained her for four years. Together they worked on the Hembury site in Devon, where Liddell uncovered a framed entrance which led to an enclosure which had been destroyed by fire. She also discovered more pottery matching other locations like Fort Harrouard in France and other Iron Age sites. Her work is still cited in other papers about these.

Alexander Keiller gave a speech at the opening of the Alexander Keiller Museum in Avebury shortly after Liddell's death, where he thanked her and spoke of the Museum as a tribute to her work. Liddell died prematurely and was buried with her parents and brother near the Church of the Holy Ghost in Basingstoke.

== Publications ==
- Notes on two excavations in Hampshire, 1931
- Report on the excavations at Hembury Fort, Devon 1930-1935, 1935
