= Holy Ghost Church, Basingstoke =

Holy Ghost Church
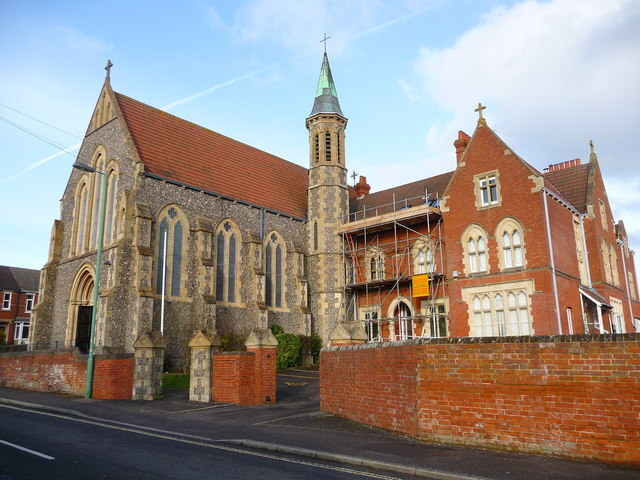
- Holy Ghost Church
- 51.2704°N 1.0924°W
- OS grid reference: SU 63414 52747
- Location: Basingstoke
- Country: England
- Denomination: Roman Catholic
- Website: StbBedesBasingstoke.org.uk

History
- Status: Parish church
- Founded: 1877
- Dedication: Holy Ghost

Architecture
- Functional status: Active
- Heritage designation: Grade II listed
- Designated: 28 September 1993
- Architect: Alexander Scoles
- Style: Gothic Revival
- Groundbreaking: 1902
- Completed: 1903

Administration
- Province: Southwark
- Diocese: Portsmouth
- Deanery: North Hampshire
- Parish: Holy Ghost

Holy Ghost Church is a Roman Catholic church in Basingstoke, Hampshire, England. It was built from 1902 to 1903 by the priest and architect Alexander Scoles in the Gothic Revival style. It was named after the old ruined medieval Chapel of the Holy Ghost in the town. It is located on the corner of Chapel Hill and Sherborne Road, north of Basingstoke railway station near the town centre. According to Historic England, the church was "the last and best work" of Alexander Scoles. He is buried there and it is a Grade II listed building.

== History ==
=== Foundation ===
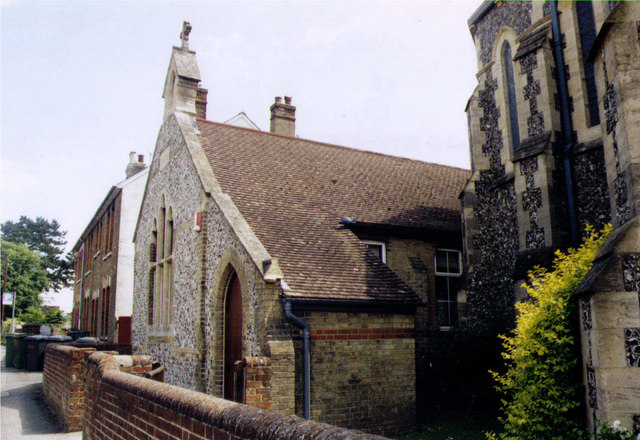
Former Holy Ghost Chapel

From the early 1800s, priests came from Woolhampton to celebrate Mass in Basingstoke for the local Catholic population. In 1875, John Soper, a local non-Catholic dignitary, allowed for the current site of the church, next to the cemetery to be a Catholic church and school. In 1877, Holy Ghost Chapel and a schoolroom were opened on the site.

=== Construction ===
In 1901, Canon Alexander Scoles came to Basingstoke. He was the son of the architect Joseph John Scoles, and brother of the Jesuit priest and architect Ignatius Scoles. He was previously in the Diocese of Clifton, had already designed many other Catholic churches and came to Basingstoke to design, build and be the priest at a new church. He paid for the construction of Holy Ghost Church. In 1902, the foundation stone of the church was laid. In 1903, the church was opened. The old Holy Ghost Chapel became the parish hall. The interior of the church was decorated by Nathaniel Westlake. In 1920, Canon Scoles died and is buried in the church. The cemetery next to the church contains the graves of Dorothy Liddell and John Aidan Liddell.

== Parish ==
Holy Ghost Church is in the Holy Ghost Parish with St Bede's Church on Popley Way, Basingstoke. Holy Ghost no longer has a Sunday Mass, instead it occasionally has weekday Masses.

== See also ==
- Roman Catholic Diocese of Portsmouth
- Media related to Holy Ghost church, Basingstoke at Wikimedia Commons
