= Hembury =

Hillfort in Devon

Hembury Fort
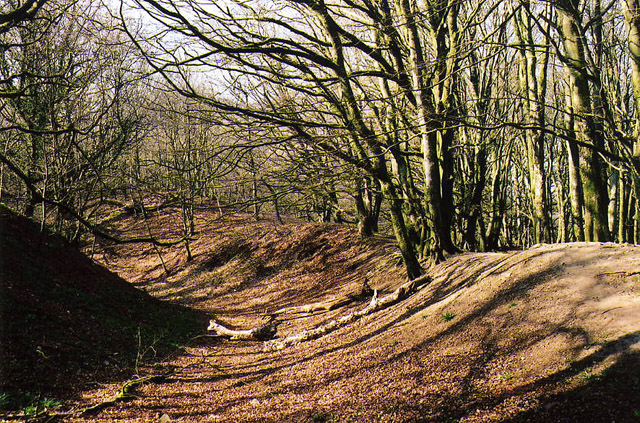
- Ramparts inside Hembury hillfort

- Location within Devon
- 50°49′14″N 03°15′41″W
- Type: Hillfort
- Periods: Neolithic, Iron Age, Roman
- Location: Hembury, Devon

Site notes
- Owner: Devon Archaeological Society
- Public access: Yes
- Website: http://www.hemburyfort.co.uk

Scheduled monument
- Official name: Hembury Fort
- Designated: 9 October 1981
- Reference no.: 1018850

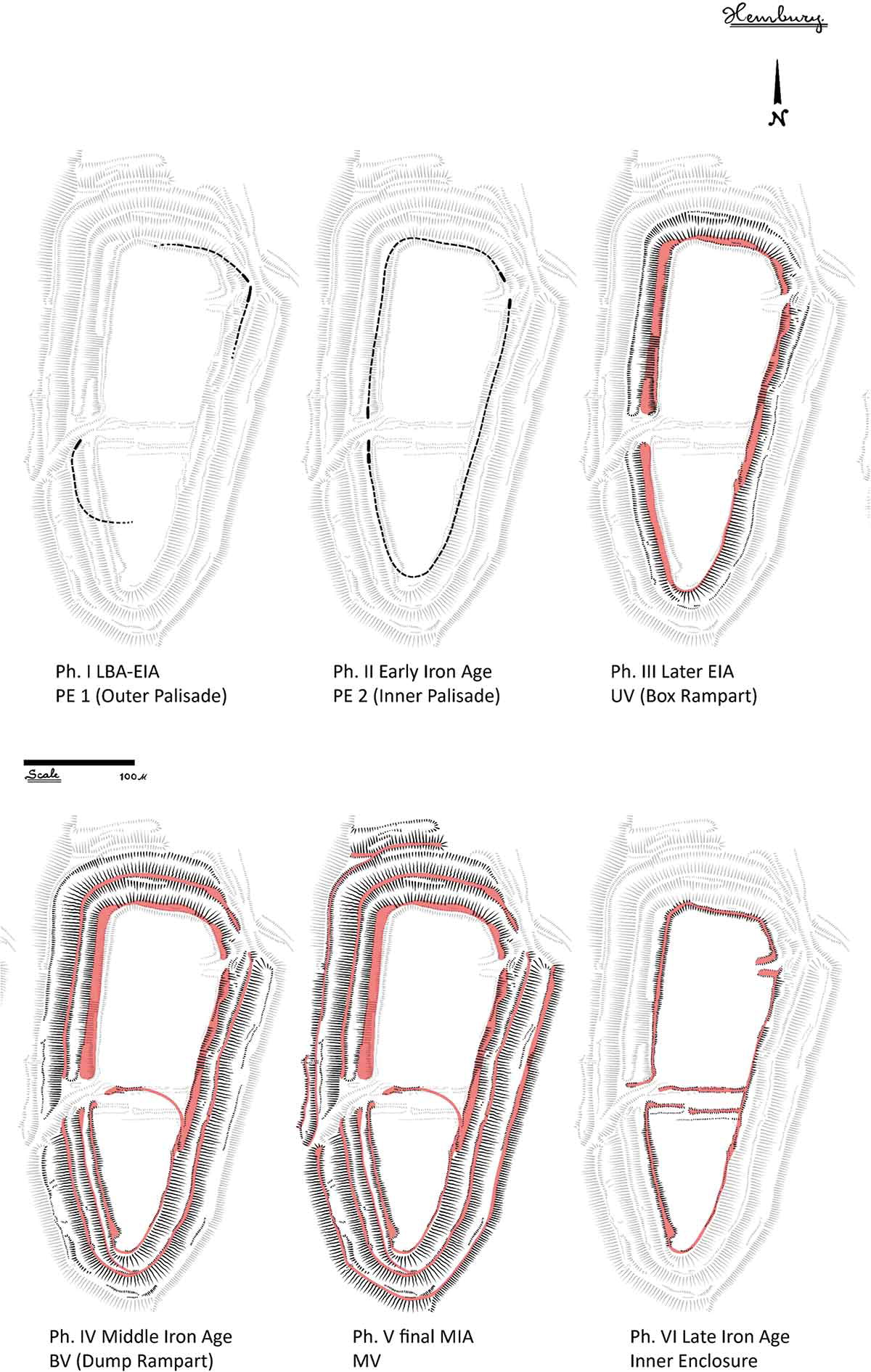
The development of Hembury from late Bronze Age/early Iron Age to the late Iron Age

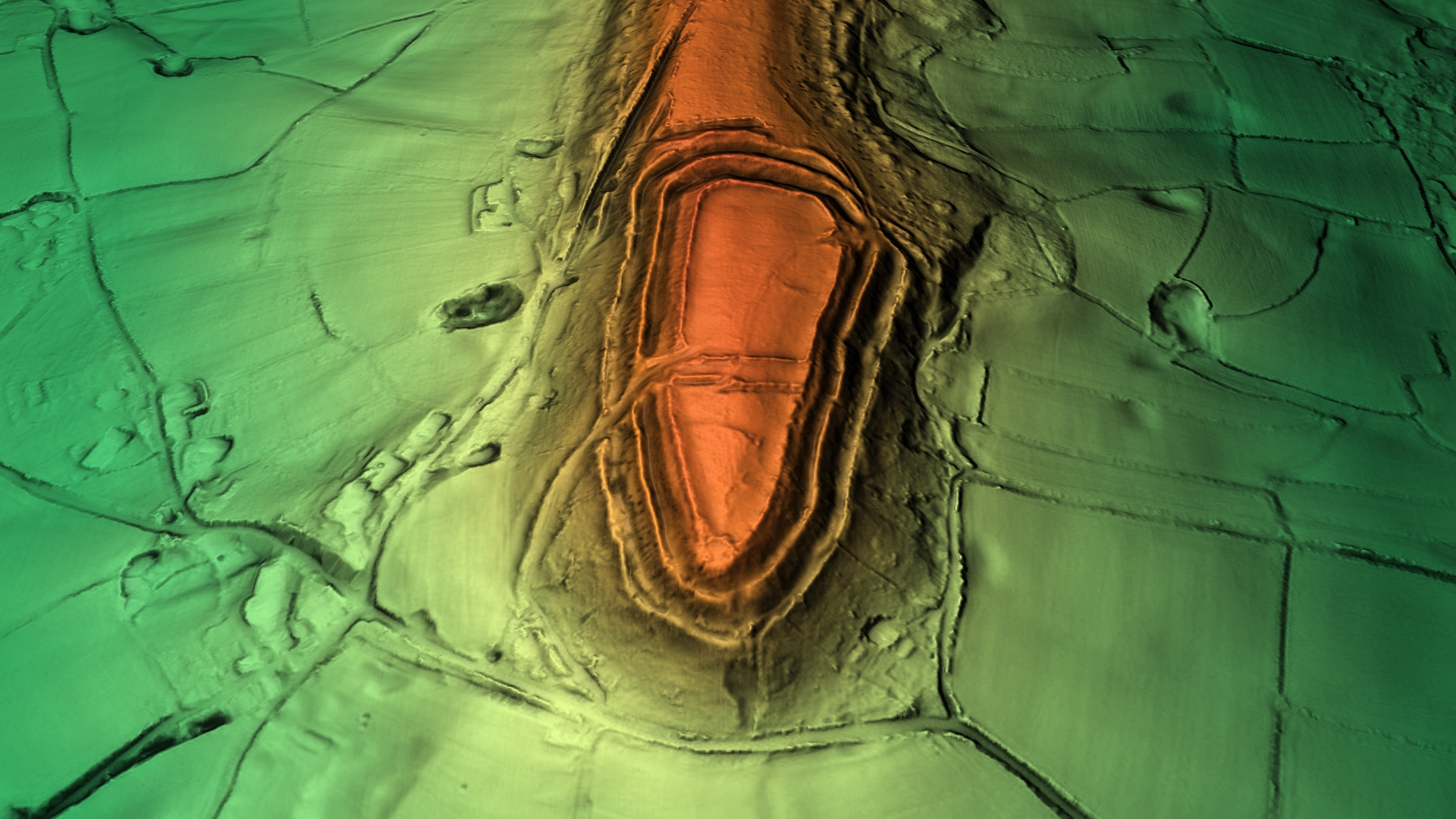
3D view of the digital terrain model

Hembury is a Neolithic causewayed enclosure and Iron Age hillfort near Honiton in Devon. Its history stretches from the late fifth and early fourth millennia BC to the Roman invasion. The fort is situated on a south facing promontory at the end of a 240m high ridge in the Blackdown Hills. It lies to the north of and overlooking the River Otter valley and this location was probably chosen to give good views of the surrounding countryside as well as for defensive reasons. The Devon Archaeological Society bought the hillfort in 2022.

== Stages of occupation ==
Originally a Neolithic site, an Iron Age hill fort was later built on the same site.

It was excavated between 1930 and 1935 by Dorothy Liddell. She identified a timber framed entrance to the causewayed enclosure and an oval arrangement of postholes in the middle which she interpreted as being a building destroyed by fire before the enclosure earthworks were built. Other evidence of Neolithic occupation included pottery, flints, axes, querns and charred grain.

During an excavation in the 1980s headed by Malcolm Todd, archaeological evidence was found on the site of Roman military occupation, suggesting a fort within the existing Iron Age site.

== Hembury ware ==
The site has given its name to some of the earliest Neolithic pottery in southern Britain after a large collection of pieces of this type of pottery were found during excavations by Dorothy Liddell. Hembury ware pottery was generally characterised by round bottomed bowls with lug handles. Much of it was made further west, around The Lizard using Gabbroic clay and it was traded throughout the British Isles. It was made at the end of the fifth millennium BCE and early 4th millennium BCE. Several pieces of Hembury ware Gabbro pottery are on display in the Royal Albert Memorial Museum in Exeter, Devon.
