= Our Lady Help of Christians and St Helen's Church, Westcliff-on-Sea =

St Helen's Church
- Our Lady Help of Christians and St Helen's Church
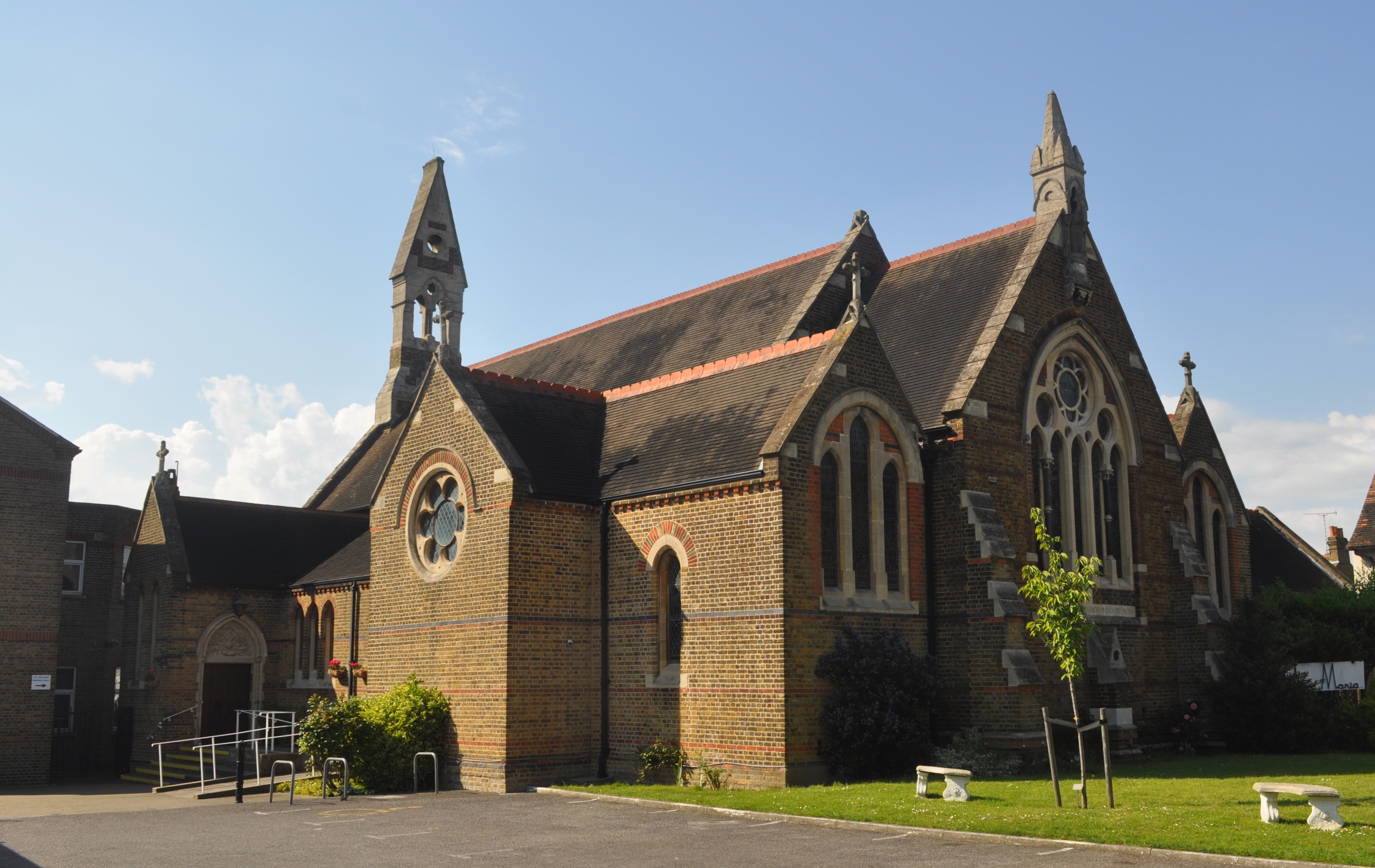
- The church in May 2024
- St Helen's Church
- 51.538097°N 0.699845°E
- Location: Westcliff-on-Sea, Southend-on-Sea, Essex
- Country: England
- Denomination: Roman Catholic

History
- Status: Parish church
- Founded: 1867
- Founder: Countess Helen Tasker
- Consecrated: 12 August 1919

Architecture
- Functional status: Active
- Heritage designation: Grade II listed
- Designated: 26 November 2014
- Architect(s): Thomas Goodman and Alexander Scoles
- Style: Gothic Revival
- Groundbreaking: 8 October 1868
- Completed: 1903
- Construction cost: £1,700

Administration
- Province: Westminster
- Diocese: Brentwood
- Deanery: Southend

St Helen's Church (formally Our Lady Help of Christians and St Helen's Church) is a Roman Catholic Parish church in Westcliff-on-Sea in Southend-on-Sea, Essex, England. It was founded in 1862 and built in 1867. Further extensions were made to the church from 1898 to 1903, designed by Alexander Scoles. It is situated on Milton Road near to the corner of St Helen's Road, next to St Bernard's High School. It is a Gothic Revival church, the first post-Reformation Catholic church to be built in Southend and a Grade II listed building.

== History ==
=== Foundation ===
In 1862, the Catholic mission in Southend was founded. It was served by a Fr John Moore. Mass was initially said in his house in Capel Terrace. The main benefactor of the church was Helen Tasker (1823–1888). She resided at Middleton Hall, Brentwood in Essex and was made a countess by Pope Pius IX in 1870. She was the daughter and inheritor of businessman Joseph Tasker, of the United Mexican Mining Association.

=== Construction ===
On 8 October 1868, Helen Tasker laid the foundation stone of the church. The architect was Thomas Goodman and the building firm was Wilkins & Son from Chatham. Goodman designed the church to be in the Gothic Revival style with inspiration from E. W. Pugin. The carvings in the church were done by Thomas Earp. Construction of the church cost £1,700. In October 1869, after the nave, chancel and sacristy were completed, the church was opened by the Archbishop of Westminster, Cardinal Manning. As the remainder of the church had not been built, temporary screens were erected to block the view of the rest of the construction being undertaken.

In 1887, a presbytery was built, the architect was Leonard Stokes. Stokes went on to design a wing of the neighbouring convent, which later became St Bernard's High School. Benedict Williamson also designed an extension on to that convent.

In 1895, a new high altar was installed. It was designed by Frederick Walters. From 1899 to 1900, the south aisle was added. From 1902 to 1903, the north aisle and sacristy were then enlarged. The architect for these extensions was Alexander Scoles.

On 12 August 1919, the church was consecrated by the first Bishop of Brentwood, Bernard Ward. During World War II, the church lost many of its stained glass windows. From 1952 to 1953, these were replaced with windows made by Hardman & Co.

== Parish ==
The church has four Sunday Masses: 6:00pm on Saturday in Polish and 9:30am, 11:15am and 6:00pm on Sunday. The current parish priest is Fr Alex Poblador RCJ (Rogationists of the Heart of Jesus)

== See also ==
- Roman Catholic Diocese of Brentwood
