= Chapel of the Holy Ghost =

Ruined chapel in Basingstoke, Hampshire, England

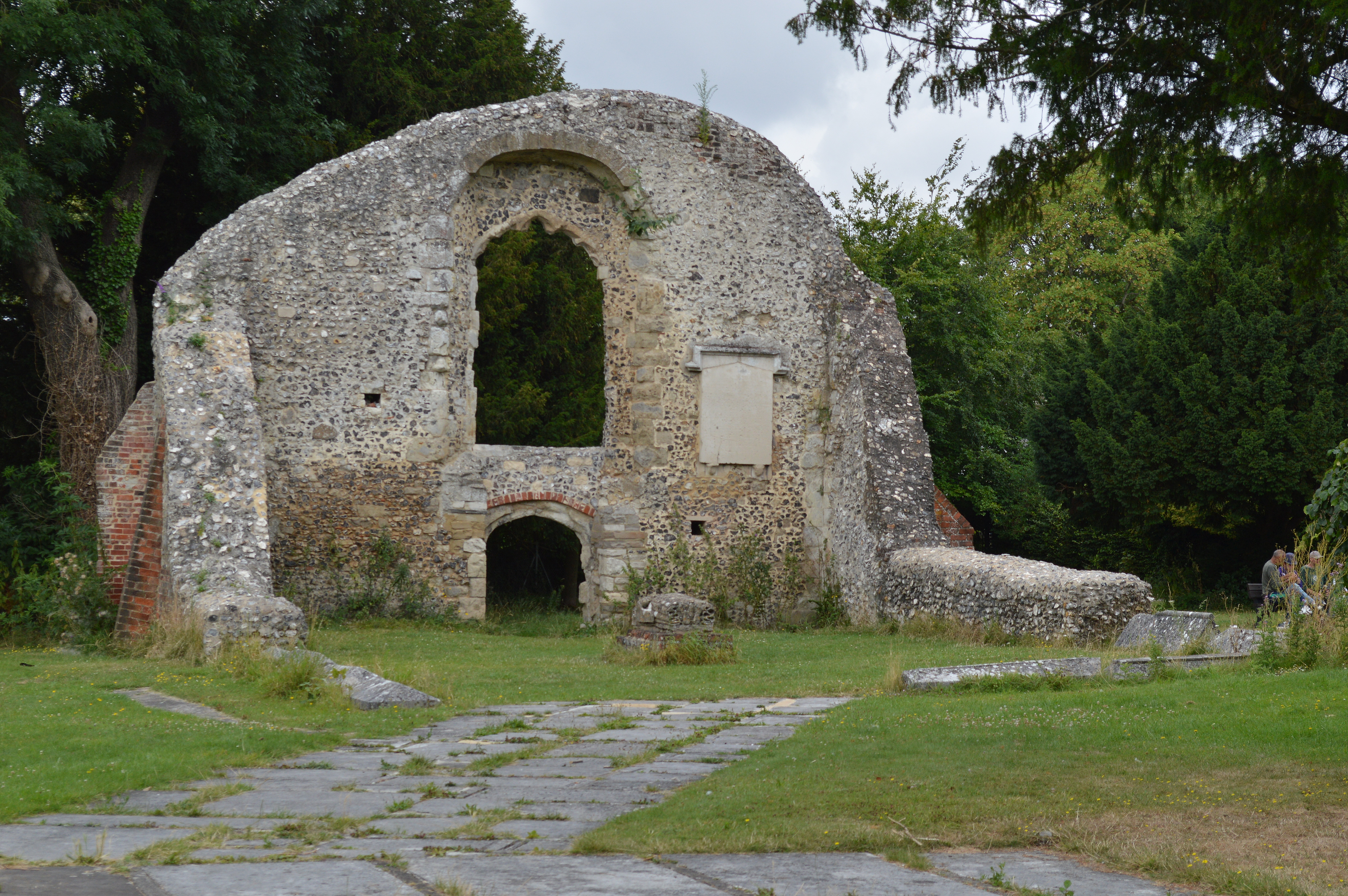
Ruins of Chapel of the Holy Ghost

The Chapel of the Holy Ghost was a chantry and guild chapel in Basingstoke, in Hampshire, England.

It was built between 1214 and 1244.

When the religious guild was refounded under Queen Mary's reign it became the foundation for the Queen Mary's School for Boys.

During the siege of Basing House between 1643 and 1645 in the Civil War, lead was stripped from the Chapel's roof leading to its eventual ruin. It had been incorporated in 1524, but was effectively out of use after the Civil War.

It's now in ruins and was listed in 1949.

The chapel in The Vyne stately home near Basingstoke contains fragments of stained glass from here.

The Catholic Holy Ghost Church, Basingstoke was named after the chapel.

== Sources ==
- Scarisbrick, Jack Joseph (1984). The Reformation and the English People. Oxford: Blackwell.
- Tipping, H. Avray (1921). "The Vyne, Hampshire, The Seat of Mr. Charles Chute". Country Life. 49 (1273): 642–649.
