= Our Lady of Loreto & St Winefride Catholic Church, Kew =

Our Lady of Loreto and St Winefride's, Kew
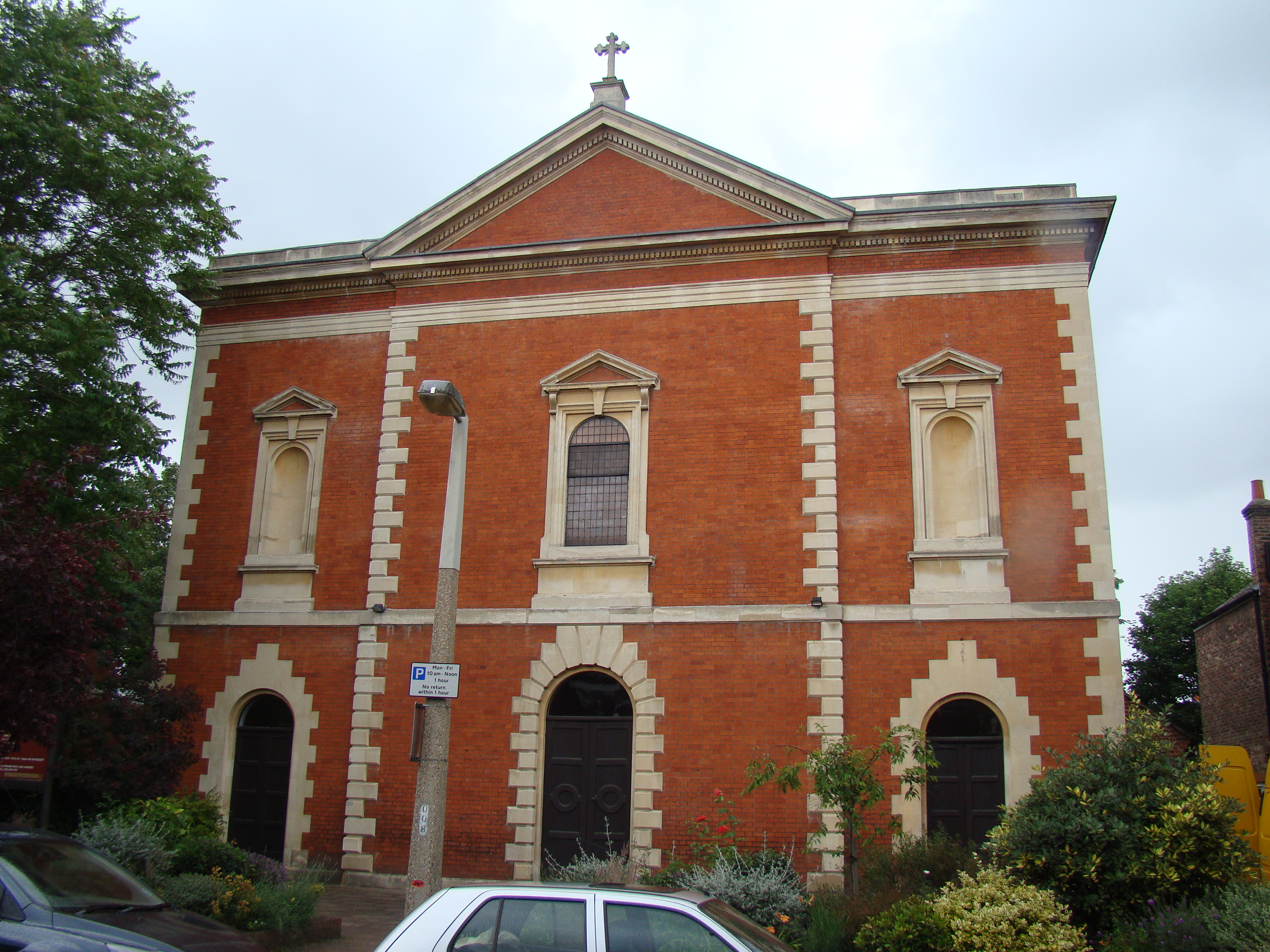
- Our Lady of Loreto and St Winefride's, Kew
- Our Lady of Loreto and St Winefride's, Kew
- 51°28′44.2″N 0°17′8.9″W
- OS grid reference: TQ 19136 76946
- Location: 1 Leyborne Park, Kew, Richmond, London TW9 3HB
- Country: England
- Denomination: Roman Catholic
- Website: www.stwinefrides.org.uk

History
- Founded: 26 October 1898 (parish); 21 November 1905 (church foundation stone)
- Founder: Society of Mary
- Dedication: 27 April 1979

Architecture
- Architect: Scoles & Raymond
- Style: Neo-Romanesque
- Years built: 1905–06

Administration
- Province: Southwark
- Diocese: Roman Catholic Archdiocese of Southwark
- Deanery: Mortlake
- Parish: Kew Gardens

Our Lady of Loreto & St Winefride Catholic Church, Kew is the parish church for the Roman Catholic parish of Kew Gardens in the London Borough of Richmond upon Thames. The church is located at 1 Leyborne Park in Kew.

== History and description ==
The Society of Mary first established a Catholic mission in a temporary chapel at 14 Kew Gardens Road, which opened for public worship on 26 October 1898 with Father Michael Cummins as the first parish priest, and was named Loreto House. The Society of Mary continued to serve the parish until 1984.

The church is dedicated to both Our Lady of Loreto and Saint Winefride. The founder of the Society of Mary had made a pilgrimage to the Loreto shrine in Italy in 1833 after asking for the Pope's approval to establish the society; and Saint Winefride was the favourite saint of one of this church's principal local benefactors, Miss Frances Elizabeth Ellis (1846–1930) of Clapham Park, whose inheritance from her father, a wealthy Brighton businessman, enabled her to help found many churches.

Designed by the architects Scoles & Raymond, (Note: Scoles & Raymond was the architectural practice of Canon Alexander Joseph Cory Scoles (1844–1920), who was parish priest of Basingstoke from 1901 to 1920, and Geoffrey Raymond (1881–1972) his junior partner and, from 1920, his successor in architectural practice. Canon Scoles was the younger son of Joseph John Scoles (1798–1863), architect (1837) of St James the Less Church, Priory Street, Colchester. From Directory of British Architects, 1834–1914: Vol. 2 (L–Z) ed. Brodie, Antonia (London, 2001), p. 552; and also Coulter, Francis (February 2007). "History of the Cardinal Bourne Hall". St James the Less and Saint Helen Catholic Church, Colchester.) the church was opened in 1906 and the side aisles, baptistery and chapels were added in 1968. The sanctuary was remodelled in 1977 and the church was refurbished and decorated in 1998. A parish hall, which also includes a smaller meeting room, is located next to the church.

After a bequest in 1979 by a parishioner, Mrs Moya Rinkenback, paid off the church's debts, the church was dedicated and consecrated on 27 April 1979 by Archbishop Michael Bowen, the Archbishop of Southwark.

== Notable congregants ==
Second World War Royal Air Force fighter pilot and flying ace Brendan "Paddy" Finucane (1920–1942), whose family lived at 26 Castlegate, Richmond, was a former altar server at the church.

== School ==
A school for infants, St Winefride's School, which was associated with the church and parish, operated from the 1910s until the early 1950s.

== Sources ==
- Rundle, Joan (2006). Our Lady of Loreto and St Winefride 1906–2006: A Short History of the Church and the Parish. Privately published.
