= John Aidan Liddell =

British military pilot

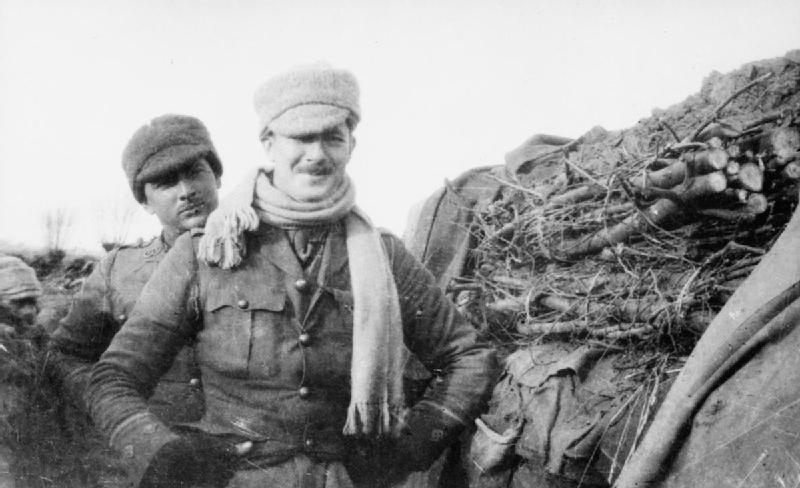
- Liddell, front, while serving with the Argyll and Sutherland Highlanders on the Western Front
- Born: 3 August 1888; Newcastle upon Tyne, England
- Died: 31 August 1915 (aged 27); De Panne, Belgium
- Burial place: Basingstoke (South View or Old) Cemetery
- Military career
- Allegiance: United Kingdom
- Branch: British Army
- Service years: 1912–1915
- Rank: Captain
- Units: The Argyll and Sutherland Highlanders; No. 7 Squadron RFC
- Conflicts: First World War
- Awards: Victoria Cross; Military Cross; Mentioned in Despatches

John Aidan Liddell, VC, MC (3 August 1888 – 31 August 1915) was a British military pilot and a recipient of the Victoria Cross, the highest award for gallantry in the face of the enemy that can be awarded to British and Commonwealth forces.

== Early life ==
Liddell was born in Newcastle upon Tyne on 3 August 1888. He was educated at Stonyhurst College, Lancashire and Balliol College, Oxford, where he took the Honours Course in Zoology.

== Military career ==
Liddell, not wishing himself "to be a slacker", joined the Officers' Special Reserve of the 3rd Battalion, Argyll and Sutherland Highlanders (Princess Louise's) of the British Army in 1912. He obtained his pilot's certificate in May 1914 and, following the outbreak of the First World War, the now-Captain Liddell embarked with his battalion on 28 August for service in France. He spent 43 consecutive days in the trenches in command of the machine gun section and was awarded the Military Cross at Le Maisnil, France, before training as a pilot and joining No. 7 Squadron of the Royal Flying Corps.

On 31 July 1915, while flying reconnaissance over Ostend-Bruges-Ghent, Belgium, Liddell's aircraft was raked by machine gun fire and Liddell was severely wounded in his right thigh. This caused momentary unconsciousness, but by great effort he recovered partial control of his machine when it had dropped nearly 3,000 feet and succeeded, although fired on, in completing the course and brought the plane back into the Allied lines. The control wheel and throttle control were smashed, as was part of the undercarriage and cockpit, but the machine and life of the observer were saved. In recognition of his feat, Liddell was awarded the Victoria Cross.

== Death and legacy ==
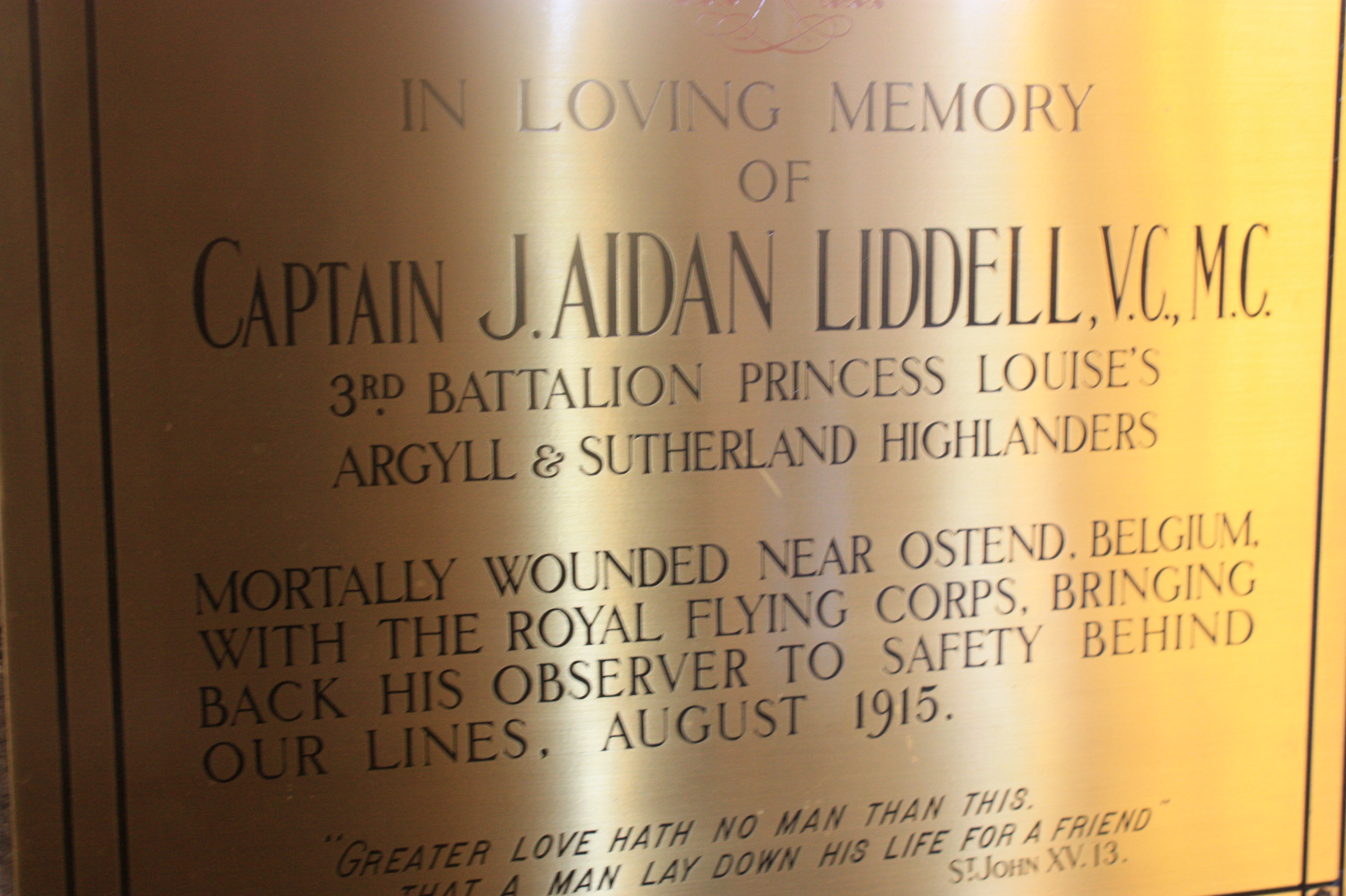
Plaque to Captain John Aidan Liddell, Church of the Holy Rude, Stirling

After having his leg removed and septic poisoning setting in, Liddell died of his wounds a month later at De Panne, Flanders, Belgium, on 31 August 1915, aged 27. He is buried in the Holy Ghost Cemetery in Basingstoke with his sister Dorothy Liddell who went out to serve in the hospital where he died for the remainder of the war.

A brass "In Memoriam" tablet was erected to Aidan Liddell in the Scottish Naval and Military Residence, Edinburgh. The inscription on the brass tablet runs as follows:

IN MEMORY OF

CAPTAIN J. AIDAN LIDDELL, V.C., M.C.
3rd (RESERVE) BATTALION
ARGYLL AND SUTHERLAND HIGHLANDERS
MORTALLY WOUNDED WHEN SERVING WITH
THE ROYAL FLYING CORPS
NEAR OSTEND, BELGIUM
AUGUST 1915

PRESENTED BY HIS BROTHER OFFICERS OF THE

3rd (RESERVE) BATTALION.

A memorial to him was also erected at Balliol College, on the west wall of the Chapel passage. His VC is on display in the Lord Ashcroft Gallery at the Imperial War Museum, London.

A plaque also exists in the Church of the Holy Rude in Stirling, close to Stirling Castle, home of his regiment.

A plaque was unveiled in 2015 at Sherfield-on-Loddon where he and his family lived on the centenary of his achieving the VC. There is also a blue plaque at his family home which is now Sherfield School and where his memory is kept alive.

On 29 August 2017 a memorial was unveiled outside the Discovery Museum in Newcastle upon Tyne, where Liddell and Privates Edward Lawson and Adam Wakenshaw are commemorated.

== Bibliography ==
- Daybell, Peter (2005). With a Smile and a Wave: The Life of Captain Aidan Liddell VC MC. Pen and Sword Books. ISBN 978-1844151608.
