= William John Wainwright =

English painter (1855–1931)

William John Wainwright PPRBSA
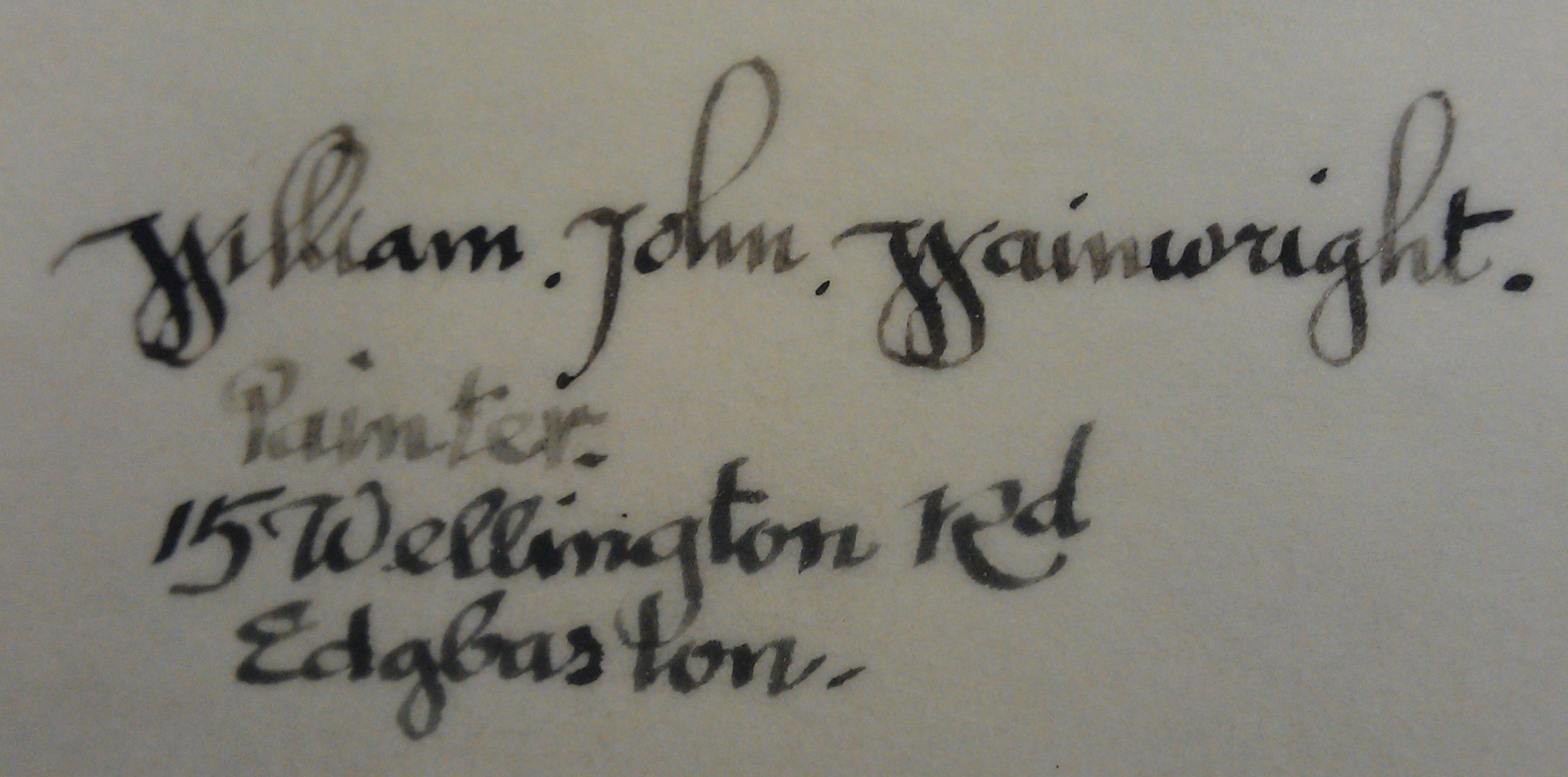
- Wainwright's entry in the RBSA members' register; in his own hand
- Born: 1855
- Died: 1931 (aged 75–76)
- Education: Birmingham School of Art
- Occupation: Painter
- Organization: Royal Birmingham Society of Artists

William John Wainwright PRBSA (1855–1931) was a painter who spent most of his life in Birmingham, England.

== Early life ==
Wainwright trained at the Birmingham School of Art under the headship of Edward R. Taylor, and started his career as an apprentice at the stained-glass firm Hardman & Co. In 1879, Wainwright founded the Birmingham Art Circle with four other artists including Walter Langley.

== The Royal Birmingham Society of Artists ==
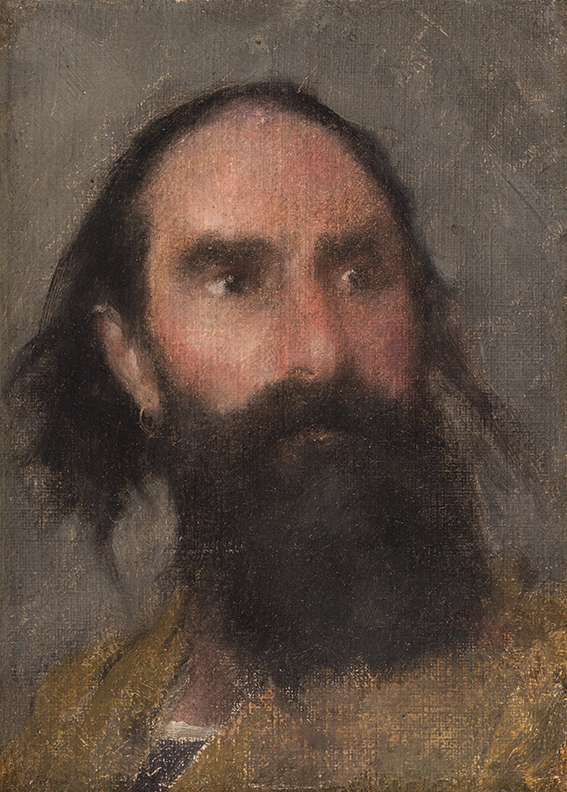
A look of horror (oil on canvas)

Wainwright was associated with the Royal Birmingham Society of Artists (RBSA) for 50 years until his death in 1931. On 12 March 1881 Wainwright was elected, with Langley and others, an associate member of the Royal Birmingham Society of Artists. During that time he achieved a number of ‘firsts’ being one of the first Associate members in 1881, the first President chosen from the ranks of the membership in 1927, and the first to have a solo exhibition of his works in 1928.
