= Stanisława Kuszelewska-Rayska =

Polish writer and translator from English (1894–1966)

- Born: Stanisława Kuszelewska; 24 December 1894; Biskupice Szlacheckie, Volhynia
- Died: 24 January 1966 (aged 71); London, United Kingdom
- Resting place: South Ealing Cemetery, London
- Occupations: Writer, translator, teacher, nurse
- Spouses: Ignacy Matuszewski 1918 (m. 1926, annulled); Ludomił Rayski 1927 (m. 1966, died)
- Children: Ewa Matuszewska
- Writing career
- Period: 1916–1966
- Genres: Non-fiction, memoirs, translations
- Notable awards: Cross of Independence (1932); Gold Cross of Merit (1936); Silver Academic Laurel (1937); Golden Academic Laurel

Stanisława Kuszelewska-Rayska (24 December 1894 – 24 January 1966) was a Polish writer, translator, nurse, teacher, and member of the Polish Military Organisation and the Home Army. She was the daughter of Edward Kuszelewski and Emilia Bohomolec, members of the local intelligentsia.

== Personal life ==
She was born in Biskupice Szlacheckie, Volhynia. She lived with her parents in Warsaw and passed her secondary school leaving exam at the Humanities College of the Scientific Courses Association in 1911. She joined the Scouts in 1912 and simultaneously studied agronomy at the Warsaw University of Life Sciences. Following the German occupation of Warsaw in 1915, she left the city with her parents. She did not complete her studies due to the outbreak of war. She married Ignacy Matuszewski on April 21, 1918, and a year and a half later, her only daughter, Ewa, was born. Ignacy Matuszewski was a politician, diplomat, and military man. Her first marriage was annulled in 1926. She married Ludomił Rayski, an engineer and pilot, head of the Aeronautics Department of the Ministry of Military Affairs, a year later.

== Career ==
She was a co-founder and vice-president of the central society of Jordan Gardens. She published countless texts while serving on the Reading Committee and the Program Council of Polskie Radio. She translated works of English, Irish, and American literature. Some of the books she translated were by writers Jack London, Aldous Huxley, Donn Byrne, and Sinclair Lewis. She was awarded the Golden Academic Laurel at the request of the Polish Academy of Literature for her services to Polish culture.

=== World War I ===
She was a nurse during World War I. In August 1915, she arrived in Moscow and co-organized a Polish Scout troop. She taught science and Polish in secondary schools after moving to Minsk. She and her troop participated in the capture of Minsk-Litovsk, which had been occupied by the Bolsheviks from February 18 to 20, 1918. She became a member of the Polish Military Organisation in May 1918. She returned to Warsaw in November of the same year and worked as a nurse. In December 1918, she participated in the defense of Lviv. She ran the press and propaganda office of the Women's National Service and edited the magazine Nasza Praca during the Polish–Soviet War.

=== World War II ===
She worked at the Infant Jesus Hospital in September 1939. She joined the Home Army in March 1943. During the Warsaw Uprising, she was responsible for economic matters, establishing the central kitchens as the commander of the utility platoon and inspector of kitchens.

Ewa Matuszewska was assigned to be a liaison for the 'Agat' Sabotage unit at 24 (March 1943), when she was a clandestine medical student. On September 26, 1944, her daughter died, and she was arrested and imprisoned in a transit camp in Pruszków. She escaped from a train transporting prisoners of war and served in the Home Army in the Świętokrzyskie forests. She returned to Poland in January 1945. In the autumn of the same year, she reached Cairo and started to serve in the Reserve Company of the Women's Auxiliary Military Service.

=== After World War II ===
She came to London in 1947 and started to write and give private lessons on Polish literature and history. She published the volume Women, which examined women's role in the Warsaw Uprising; it was one of the first books the Literary Institute published in Rome. She also published multiple reviews in Kultura. She died on January 24, 1966, in London; her body is buried in South Ealing Cemetery in London.

== Selected works ==
=== Books ===
- On Polish Scouting, Publisher M. Głodkowski, Moscow, 1916.
- Visiting Life, Polish Library, Warsaw, 1939.
- Women, Literary Institute, Rome, 1946.
- Wonders of Life, F. Mildner & Sons, London, 1948.
- "Music. A Story", Dziennik Polski i Dziennik Żołnierza [London], 1954, no. 66–79.
- "These Two", Dziennik Polski i Dziennik Żołnierza [London], 1955, no. 195–284.

=== Selected articles ===
- "A Modest Contribution to a Serious Matter", Bluszcz, 1924, no. 38, pp. 655–656.
- "Books on the Shelves. Impressions from the International Book Exhibition in Florence", Bluszcz, 1925, no. 25, p. 677.
- "Woman's Independence as the Modern Art of Love", Kobieta Współczesna, 1928, no. 13, pp. 5–6.
- "Nurses", Kobieta Współczesna, 1928, no. 45, pp. 16–18.
- "Happy End", Kobieta Współczesna, 1930, no. 38, pp. 2–3.
- "The Idea of Universal Civic Service of Women", Kobieta Współczesna, 1930, no. 47, pp. 2–3.
- "Lawns for Children", Kobieta Współczesna, 1930, no. 6, pp. 2–3.
- "Chasing Zeros", Kobieta Współczesna, 1931, no. 8, pp. 3–4.
- "The Press and the Youth", Kobieta Współczesna, 1931, no. 27, pp. 4–5.
- Jordanowski Garden as an Educator, Nasza Drukarnia, Warsaw, 1938.
- "The Childhood and Youth of Ignacy Matuszewski", Biuletyn Organizacyjny KNAPP, 1946, no. 47–48, pp. 10–11.
- "Cairo Seeks God", Wiadomości [London], 1946, no. 8, p. 1.
- "Apart from the heart and money – thought", Wiadomości [London], 1947, no. 27, p. 2.

=== Translations ===
- Jack London, Odyssey of the North, "Ignis" Publishing Society, Warsaw, 1922.
- Jack London, A Woman's Heart, "Ignis" Publishing Society, Warsaw, 1922.
- Jack London, The Story of Jessie Ook, Bluszcz, Warsaw, 1923.
- Jack London, Martin Eden [vol. I, vol. II], "Ignis" Publishing Society, Warsaw, 1923.
- Jack London, On the Trail: Autobiographical Sketches, "Ignis" Publishing Society, Warsaw, 1923.
- Jack London, God of His Fathers, "Ignis" Publishing Society, Warsaw, 1924.
- Jack London, The Call of the Wild, "Ignis" Publishing Society, Warsaw, 1924.
- Jack London, Love of Life: Selected Short Stories [vol. I, vol. II], Biblioteka Dzieł Wyborowych Publishing House, Warsaw, 1925.
- Jack London, The Law of the White Man, "Biblioteka Groszowa" Publishing House, Warsaw, 1925.
- Jack London, Adventure, E. Wende and Company, Warsaw, 1925.
- Jack London, White Fang, "Rój" Publishing Society, Warsaw, 1926.
- Jack London, Martin Eden [vol. III, vol. IV], E. Wende and Company, Warsaw, 1926.
- Jack London, Scorn of Women, "Rój" Publishing Society, Warsaw, 1926.
- Jack London, Faith of Men, Society of Polish Bookstores in the Borderlands, Warsaw, 1926.
- Donn Byrne, Messer Marco Polo, J. Mortkowicz Publishing House, Cracow, 1927.
- James Fenimore Cooper, The Last of the Mohicans, Księgarnia św. Wojciecha, Poznań, 1927.
- Jack London, The Scarlet Plague, "Rój" Publishing Society, Warsaw, 1927.
- Jack London, The Turtles of Tasman, "Rój" Publishing Society, Warsaw, 1927.
- Jack London, A Daughter of the Snows, "Rój" Publishing Society, Warsaw, 1928.
- James Fenimore Cooper, The Pioneers, St. Adalbert's Bookstore, Poznań, 1929.
- Jack London, The Valley of the Moon, Book 1: "The Disaster", "Rój" Publishing Society, Warsaw, 1929.
- John Erskine, The Private Life of Helen of Troy, "Rój" Publishing Society, Warsaw, 1930.
- Jack London, The Valley of the Moon, Book 2: "Happiness", "Rój" Publishing House, Warsaw, 1930.
- Axel Munthe, The Story of San Michele, J. Przeworski Publishing House, Warsaw, 1930.
- Donn Byrne, The Hangman's House, "Rój" Publishing House, Warsaw, 1932.
- Aldous Huxley, Brave New World, "Rój" Publishing House, Warsaw, 1932.
- Sinclair Lewis, Dodsworth, "Gutenberg" Fergo i Ska Publishing House, Cracow, 1932.
- Aldous Huxley, Jesting Pilate, "Rój" Publishing House, Warsaw, 1935.
- Jack London, Love of Life, "Rój" Publishing House, Warsaw, 1935.
- Aldous Huxley, Beyond the Mexique Bay, J. Przeworski Publishing House, Warsaw, 1938.
- Jack London, The Sea-Wolf, War Relief Services National Catholic Welfare Conference, Rome, 1946.

== Awards and honors ==
- Cross of Independence (1932)
- Gold Cross of Merit (1936)
- Silver Academic Laurel (1937)
