= Barnett Samuel Marks =

British painter

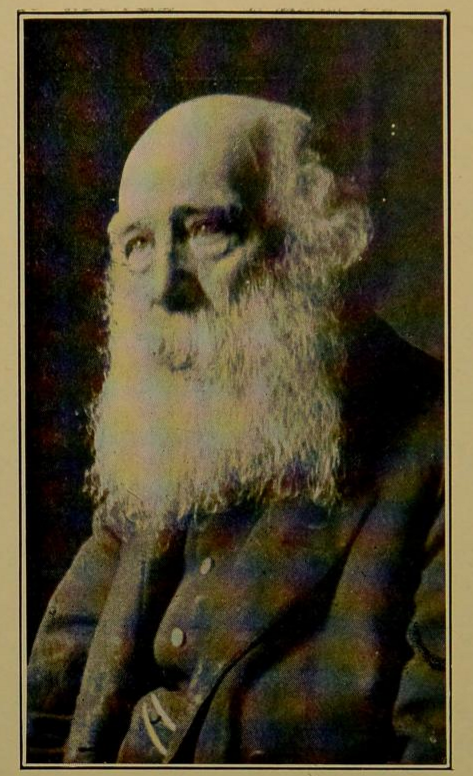
Barnett Samuel Marks

Barnett Samuel Marks (Cardiff 1827–London 1916) R.C.A. (Royal Cambrian Academician) was a Welsh-Jewish portrait painter who was also noted for his social realism paintings.

== Early life in Cardiff ==
Barnett Samuel Marks was born in Cardiff on 8 May 1827, the first child of Mark Lyon Marks, originally from Neath, and Ann Michael from Swansea. His father was a watchmaker and auctioneer and an important figure in the establishment of the Jewish community in Cardiff. His mother's grandfather, a wealthy silversmith and merchant, had arrived in South Wales from Germany in the middle of the eighteenth century and the family had played a key part in establishing the first major Jewish community in Wales at Swansea.

Marks was educated privately in Cardiff. In addition to his early promise as an artist and portrait painter, he played the piano and the ophicleide and took part in cultural events in the town. He supplemented his income from painting portraits by giving art classes. His studio was at the family home on the major commercial street of St Mary Street, Cardiff, where his father's business was based.

He was initiated as a Freemason in 1856 at the St David's Lodge, which met in Aberdare, moving to the Glamorgan Lodge in Cardiff in 1861. With fellow Freemasons and Cardiff gentlemen he played cricket at Cardiff Arms Park in its early years as a sporting venue.

In late 1857 his career received a boost when he gained the patronage of the Marchioness of Bute.

Early the following year Marks married his cousin Zipporah from Swansea, the second daughter of his deceased uncle Michael Marks, and he moved from St Mary Street to his own home and studio at 33 Charles Street, Cardiff. From 1859 he regularly exhibited at the Royal Academy Summer Exhibition in London.

In 1859 he joined the newly created Volunteer Force. The following year he was called upon to do jury service. The experience seems to have had a big impact on him. He used the image of a young boy to highlight the plight of poor children in the town. A resulting series of paintings would bring him considerable notice at the Royal Academy.

In the early 1860s he supported the Cardiff Free Library, being on the Committee 1865-66, and where he gave art classes for young mechanics.

== Life in London ==
In 1866, after consistently exhibiting at the Royal Academy Summer Exhibition, with a growing reputation as a portrait painter and a young family to educate, Barnett Samuel Marks moved to London. His studio was initially in Great Portland Street, then at Westbourne Terrace, and later, from 1874, in Fitzroy Square, where his neighbours included Solomon Alexander Hart (librarian, and previously a professor, at the Royal Academy), Ford Madox Brown (artist), Robert William Edis (architect), George Bernard Shaw.

He contributed to a number of private exhibitions and taught art at the Westminster Jews’ Free School and the Bayswater Jewish School, whilst continuing his career as a portrait painter. More than ever in London, he was affected by the numbers of homeless children on the streets and the work of Dr. Barnardo inspired a series of diptychs showing groups of boys before and after their rescue. These paintings received favourable comment from the art critic of the Art Journal and were seen and applauded by John Ruskin.

In 1879 he joined the Buckingham and Chandos Lodge of Freemasons which met at the Freemasons' Hall, 60 Great Queen Street. He painted at least two portraits for the Hall and, after the disastrous fire in 1883, he was commissioned to paint copies of two important paintings that had been badly damaged. He was a Master of this lodge and was presented with a Past Master's jewel in 1889. Amongst the brothers were Sir John Braddick Monckton and Bram Stoker.

The family home was in the then country suburb of Ealing, where they lived from 1867 to c.1897. Marks involved himself in the local community here and supported John Allen Brown in the establishment of the Ealing Free Library, which opened in 1883.

He maintained contact with Cardiff, contributing to and helping to organise exhibitions in the town, for example the Fine Art and Industrial Exhibition of 1870, which was the first major public art exhibition to be held in Cardiff, the Fine Arts Exhibition at the Drill Hall in 1879 and the early exhibitions of the Royal Cambrian Academy. He was elected a full member of this latter institution in 1887. He donated a number of paintings to the Cardiff Town Council and also received a number of commissions for portraits. As president of the Art Section of the Cymmrodorion Society, he delivered a paper on art as part of the 1883 National Eisteddfod of Wales in Cardiff and was an adjudicator of art for the Eisteddfod of 1885. He was present at the opening of the New Synagogue in Cardiff in 1897, having been President of the Cardiff Hebrew Congregation.

In 1892 he was commissioned to paint a portrait of the then Prince of Wales (the future Edward VII) for a public institution in Calcutta (Kolkata). The following year the United Grand Lodge of England commissioned a portrait of Edward, First Earl of Lathom, the Pro Grand Master (see below). He continued painting portraits at least until 1898, when he was in his early 70s and he also exhibited a number of still life paintings in later life at the Royal Cambrian Academy.

He was a committee member of the Jews’ Free School, the Westminster Jews’ Free School and the Bayswater Jewish School, and was a delegate to the Jewish Voluntary Schools Association. He was also Vice-President of the Industrial Committee of the charitable organisation "The Jewish Board of Guardians".

In c.1897 the Marks family moved from Ealing to 10 Matheson Road, Kensington where Barnett Samuel Marks died on 6 December 1916.

== Selected works ==
- Portrait of John Hemingway (1795-1872) Stonemason for the Britannia Bridge across the Menai Strait. Painted 1854. Oil on canvas. 162 x 120 cm Treftadaeth Menai Heritage.
- The Dock, a Reminiscence of the Court. Painted c.1868–1871. Oil on canvas, 35 x 31 cm. Walker Art Gallery, National Museums Liverpool. Exhibited at the Royal Cambrian Academy Exhibition 1907. See Catalogue (no. 57).
- Saved from the Streets, Portraits of Boys on Board the 'Chichester' Training Ship: In Deep Mire Where There is No Standing. Painted c.1872. Oil on canvas, 38 x 72.3 cm. National Maritime Museum. See Cardiff Times 9 March 1872.
- Saved from the Streets, Portraits of Boys on Board the 'Chichester' Training Ship: Escape as a Bird out of the Snare of the Fowler. Painted c.1872. Oil on canvas, 38 x 72.3 cm. National Maritime Museum. See Cardiff Times 9 March 1872.
- Board School Children or Some of our New Pupils, painted from sketches taken in a London board school. Painted 1874. Oil on canvas 47.6 x 74.3 cm. National Museum of Wales acquired by the then Cardiff Museum 1882. See Cardiff Times 6 August 1881.
- Portrait of Lord Aberdare (1815–1895) when Mr. Bruce. Painted 1880. Oil on canvas, 59 x 48.5 cm Mansion House, Cardiff. Cardiff Council. See Weekly Mail 14 February 1880. Henry Bruce, 1st Lord Aberdare, said of Barnett Samuel Marks: "[He] is not only an excellent artist, whose likenesses are remarkably good, but he is one of the best-hearted men I know."
- Portrait of Mrs Mary Frost at the Age of 80. Painted 1880. Oil on canvas, 61 x 51 cm, Victoria Art Gallery, Bath. (Painted in 1880 according to British and Irish Paintings in Public Collections).
- Portrait of Sir John Braddick Monckton (1832-1902). Painted 1882. Oil on canvas, 138 x 110 cm. The Library and Museum of Freemasonry, London. See Weekly Mail 30 December 1882.
- Portrait of Joseph Edwards (1814-1882), sculptor. Painted 1882. Oil on canvas 83.5 x 73.3 cm National Museum of Wales. See Weekly Mail 30 December 1882.

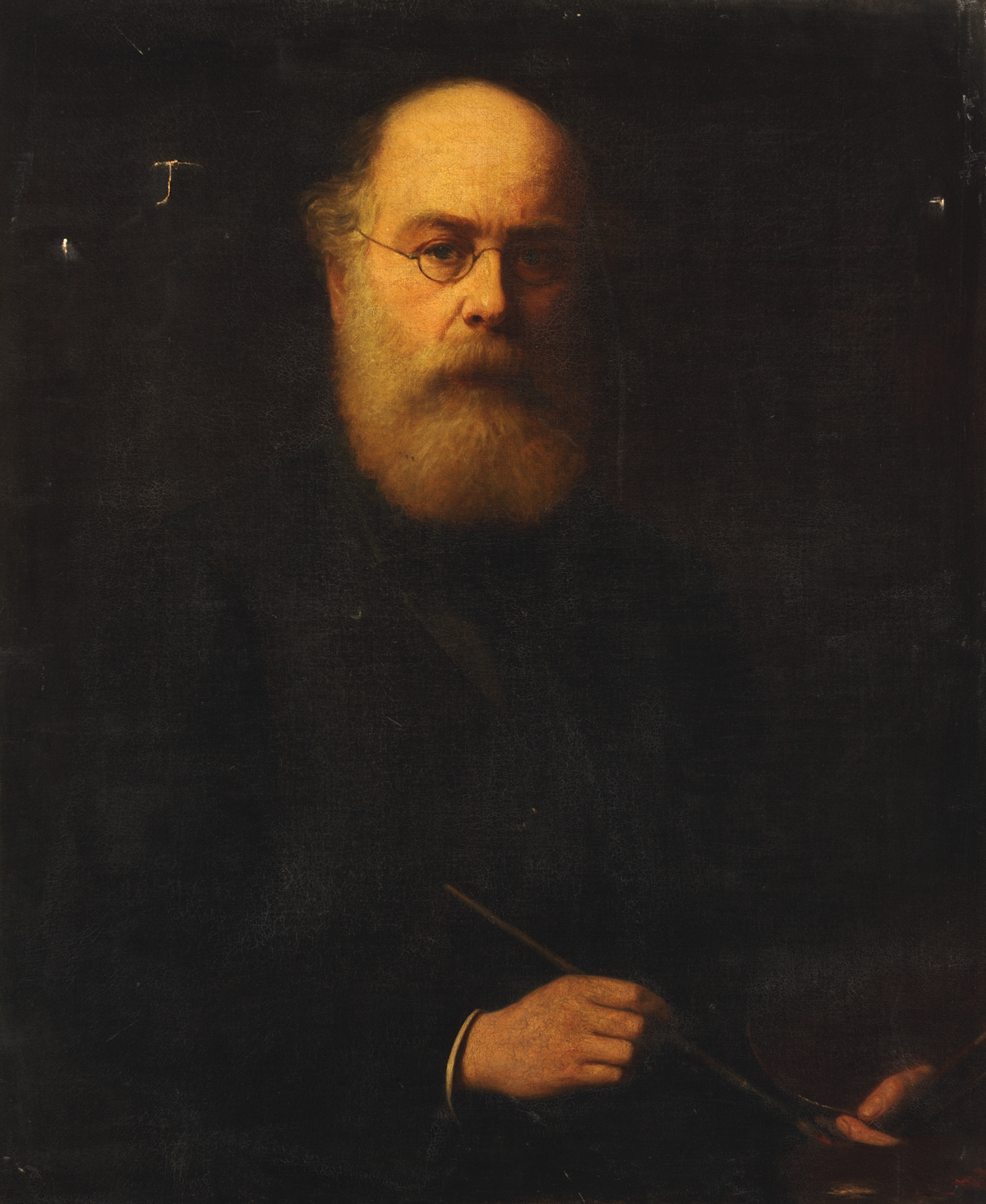
Self Portrait painted 1884. Photo credit: Ealing Local History Centre; artuk.org

- Self-portrait. Painted 1884. Oil on canvas, 75 x 62 cm. Ealing Central Library. Ealing Local History Centre. Exhibited in the Cardiff Fine Art Exhibition of 1884. See Weekly Mail 1 March 1884.
- Portrait of Mr. Daniel Thomas (1849-1884). Painted 1884 - posthumously after Thomas, colliery manager, died trying to rescue others involved in a mining explosion at Penygraig, Pontypridd. Oil on canvas, 76.7 x 63.7 cm. National Museum of Wales, National Museum Cardiff. See Weekly Mail 16 February 1884 and Cardiff Times 15 November 1884.
- Full-length portrait of HRH George, Prince of Wales (later George IV) (1762-1830), Grand Master of the Moderns’ Grand Lodge from 1790 to 1813, painted wearing the robes of the Order of the Garter.] Painted 1885. Oil on canvas 238.5 x 147.5 cm, The Library and Museum of Freemasonry, London. Painted as a replacement of the painting by Matthew William Peters (itself a copy of a Joshua Reynolds) that was destroyed by fire in 1883.
- Full-length portrait of HRH Augustus Frederick, Duke of Sussex (sixth son of George III) (1773-1843) Grand Master of the United Grand Lodge of England from 1813 to 1843, painted wearing Highland costume. Painted in 1885. Oil on canvas 249 x 147.5 cm. The Library and Museum of Freemasonry, London. Painted as a replacement of an original destroyed by fire in 1883.

- Portrait of Frederic Davison (c.1815-1889). Painted c.1885. Oil on canvas, 125.5 x 100 cm, The Library and Museum of Freemasonry, London.
- Portrait of the Reverend Edward Matthews (1813-1892). Painted c.1887. Oil on canvas, 116 x 90.5 cm, The National Library of Wales. See Montgomeryshire Express and Radnor Times 29 November 1892.

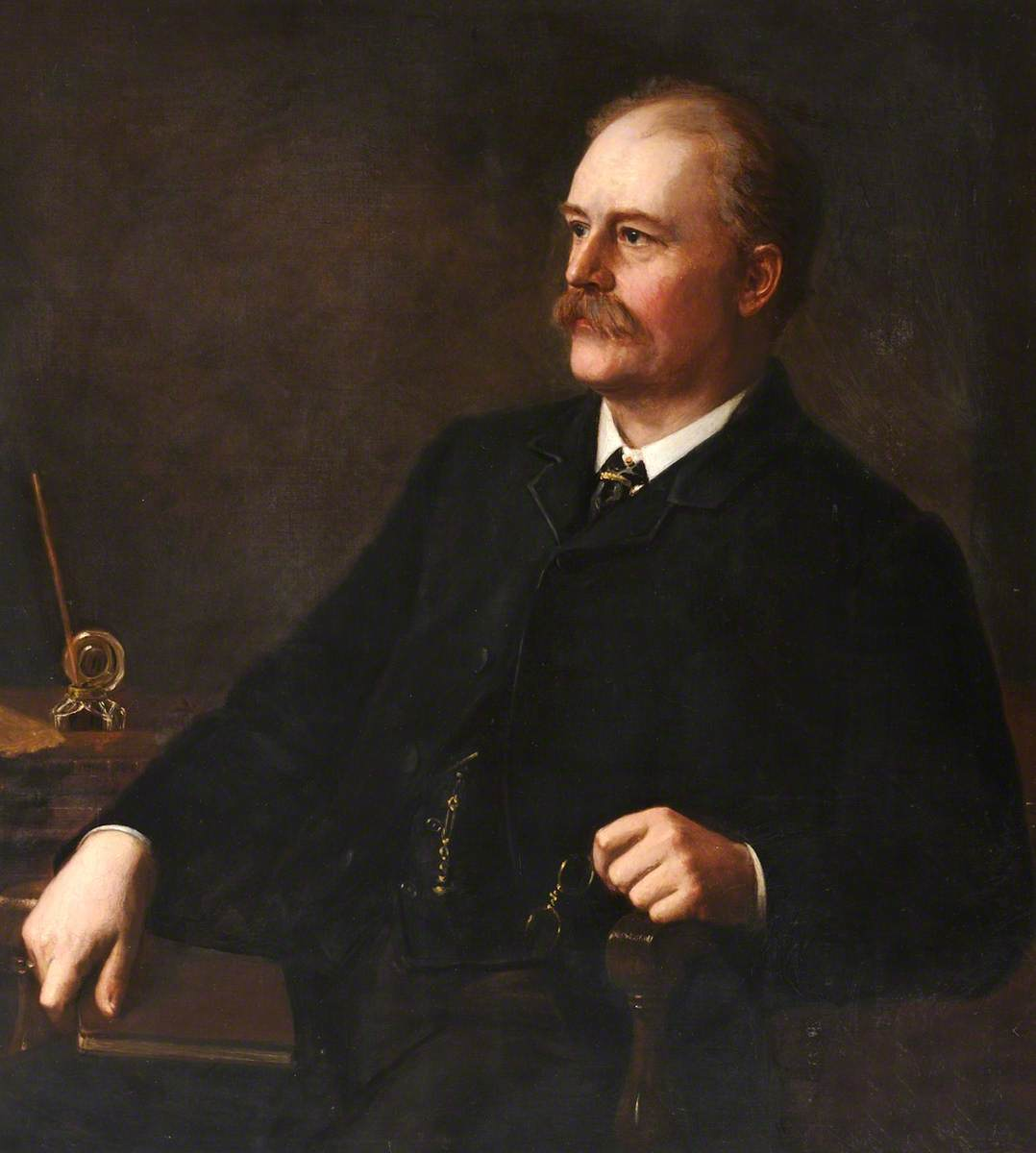
Portrait of John Allen Brown. Photo credit: Ealing Local History Centre; artuk.org

- Portrait of John Allen Brown (1833-1903), FRGS, First Chairman of the Ealing Free Library. Painted 1888. Oil on canvas, 79 x 74.5 cm, Ealing Central Library, Ealing Local History Centre.
- Portrait of Reverend Dr Thomas Davies. Oil on canvas 127 x 101.5 cm, Scolton Manor Museum, Haverfordwest, Pembrokeshire County Council's Museums Service.
- Portrait of Thomas Fenn (1820-1901). Painted 1890. Oil on canvas, 142 a 110 cm. The Library and Museum of Freemasonry. See Cambrian 12 December 1890.
- Portrait of Edward (1837-1898), 1st Earl of Lathom and 2nd Baron Skelmersdale, GCB. Painted 1893. Oil on canvas, 239 x 145 cm (estimated). The Library and Museum of Freemasonry, London. Exhibited at the Royal Cambrian Academy Exhibition of 1894. See Catalogue (no. 62).
- Portrait of Alderman Daniel Lewis, J.P., Mayor of Cardiff 1890-1891. Painted 1893. Oil on canvas, 126 x 100.5 cm. City Hall Cardiff. See Evening Express 14 March 1893.
- Portrait of Andrew Fulton, Mayor of Cardiff 1884-1885. Painted 1895. Oil on canvas, 124.5 x 99 cm. City Hall, Cardiff.
- Portrait of David Duncan. Painted 1899. Oil on canvas, 126 x 100 cm. Llyfrgell Genedlaethol Cymru / The National Library of Wales.
- Sir Edward Montague Nelson Esq. (1841-1919), JP, CC. Oil on canvas, 122 x 96 cm. Ealing Town Hall. Ealing Local History Centre.
- Portrait of George McCulloch (1848 - 1907), mine owner and art collector. Oil on canvas, gifted by widow to The Broken Hill Art Gallery, NSW, Australia in 1928.

== Family ==
Barnett Samuel and Zipporah Marks had six children:

Michael Herbert Marks (1858-1943) was a member of the London Stock Exchange. His first wife died nine months after their Anglican marriage and later that year he renounced the Jewish faith and was baptised. He had one daughter with his second wife. Gladys Mary Jessie Marks (1888-1981) was Barnett Samuel Mark's only grandchild.

Constance Isabelle Marks (1860-1940) received her B.A. degree from the University of London in 1888. She taught maths and was editor of the Mathematical Section of the Educational Times and was a member of the London Mathematical Society.

Gertrude Catherine Marks (1863-1942) was a painter and exhibited at the Royal Cambrian Academy from 1900 to 1903. In 1905 she qualified as a midwife. She worked at Queen Charlotte's Hospital, one of the oldest maternity hospitals in Europe. In 1908 she published "The maternity nurses’ daily guide or pocket-book of reference, being clear and concise directions as to the duties and responsibilities of a maternity nurse from the time of her engagement to nurse a patient until the completion of the case," which ran to three editions.

Florence Helena Marks (1864-1947) was a concert pianist and music teacher. She was the author of The sonata, its form and meaning as exemplified in the piano sonatas by Mozart, first published in 1921. She also wrote and had published two songs with words written by Barnett Samuel Marks.

Anne Marks (1866-1927) was a painter. She studied art at Calderon's studio and exhibited at the Royal Academy in 1900 and 1907. Between 1900 and 1915 she exhibited yearly at the Royal Cambrian Academy: also from 1922 to 1924. She specialised in animal paintings: particularly cats. She wrote and illustrated The Cat in History, Legend and Art which was published in 1909.

Percy Leman Marks (1867-1941) was an architect who wrote a number of books on architecture. He was secretary of the Concrete Institute (which would become the Institution of Structural Engineers) from 1917 to 1921. He was elected member (for Hammersmith) of the Board of Deputies of British Jews in 1913.
