= Victoria Hall (Ealing) =

Public hall in London, England

Coordinates: 51.5132°N 0.3080°W

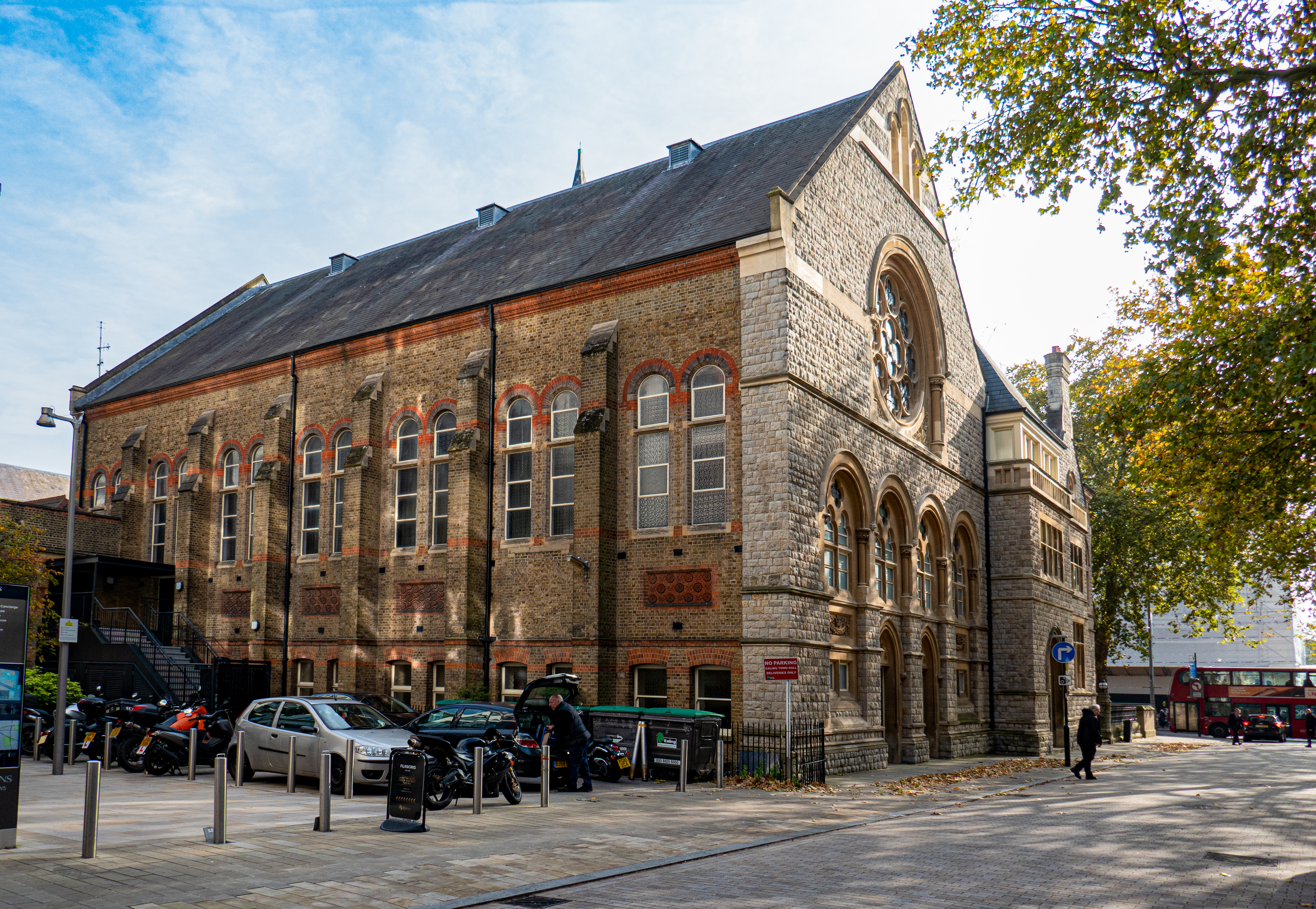
The Victoria Hall, Ealing

The Victoria Hall, Ealing is a public hall belonging to the west London community of Ealing for their recreational use. It was conceived in 1886 by Charles Jones the first architect, engineer and surveyor of Ealing Council. Its construction next to Ealing Town Hall was funded entirely by public donations and its operations governed by the Victoria Hall Trust, established in 1893. In 2015 the Council announced plans to sell off the Grade II listed building to a development partner on a long lease. The plan led to protests by local residents' groups who called for the Hall to continue to be available for use as a public asset.

== History ==
=== 1800s ===
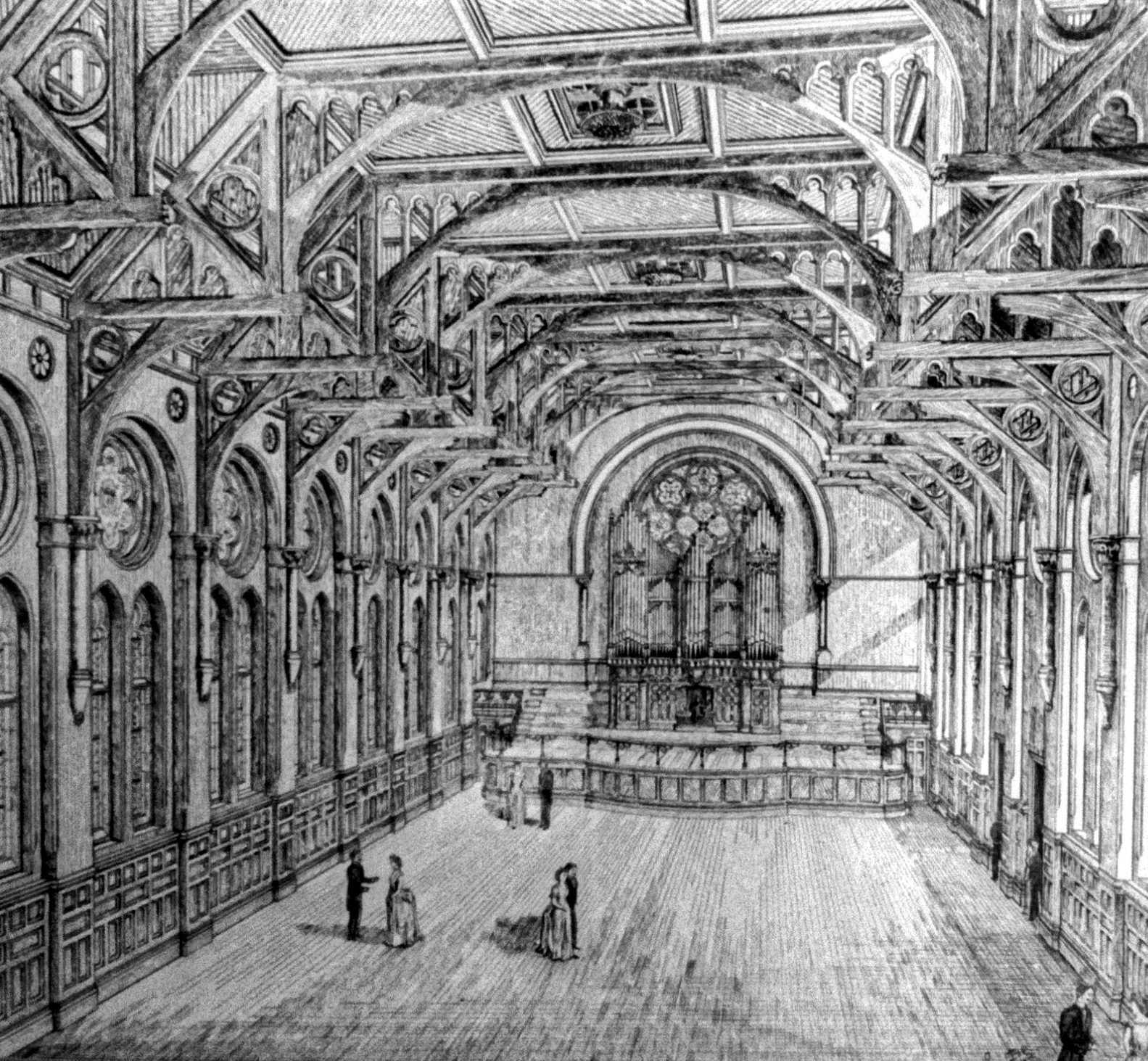
Charles Jones' original drawing of the interior of the Victoria Hall

The hall's origins and early history are recorded in Jones' 1904 book Ealing: From Village to Corporate Town. He noted that following the start of building a new Town Hall for the Council: "One great desideratum for a growing district like Ealing, viz a public assembly room, was wanting...The happy thought occurred to me that a permanent benefit to the poor might be associated with a Jubilee Hall, and be a perpetual memorial of our beloved Queen."

He put the idea to the Chairman of the Ealing Local Board, Edward Montague Nelson, who agreed "with alacrity". The Middlesex County Times reported that a public meeting on 25 January 1887 had greeted the launch of the project with cheers and enthusiastic applause.

==== Initial funding ====
It was made clear from the start that no public money was to be involved in the project. While the Town Hall itself was being paid for largely from the sale of the old building, the Memorial Hall, as it was then called, would be paid for by public subscription. An initial sum of nearly £2,000 (the equivalent of £270,000 today) had already been raised in advance of the public meeting, where more subscriptions promised. Montague Nelson, who chaired the meeting, said as part of his address: "It is fair to assume that from a hall which is to be built in this way by public subscriptions, on which there is no interest to pay on capital, there will be an income over and above its working expenses [which] should be vested in the existing Local Board, for the time being, as Trustee and devoted by them to local objects…. We might grant a substantial sum annually to, say, the Cottage Hospital and the Almshouses, to the School of Science and Art of which we have one; or a grant to the Free Library." The scheme quickly took off. "Although the whole of the £5,000 for the hall was not obtained at once, a proposal to raise the balance by debentures of £10 each, repayable out of the profits without interest, soon cleared off the remaining debt, and left the memorial hall free as a charitable bequest forever," notes Jones.

==== Original extent ====
The original design was for a high main hall at first-floor level with smaller rooms, including the Prince's Hall at ground and basement level beneath. It allowed for the installation of an organ at the east end with the rose window visible behind, as shown in Jones' own drawing of 1888. As Jones notes this had not been fully achieved by the official opening by Edward, Prince of Wales on 15 December 1888: "The only regret we have is that the organ, as shown in the original design, was not carried out: £500 still remains at deposit for this object, and some day we may hope to see it accomplished, when Ealing will take its place, as it should have done years ago, as a first-class musical suburb."

=== Further development ===
The hall was made available for hire from an early stage for events such as dances, wedding receptions and political rallies.

Victoria Hall became a separate building from the Town Hall after the latter was extended at the northeast corner. The only significant alteration after that date was the infilling of the open 'area' in the basement to the south, which had been a light well to the Prince's Hall.

In the 1920s and the 1930s some internal changes were made. The platform inside the Victoria Hall at the west end, which had been accessed from an internal staircase at the southwest, was removed. The external stairs to the second west bay on the north side were also removed, which led to the closure of the access through the bay. At around the same time an external covered way was removed. Public access to the Prince's Hall and its related spaces became mainly through stairs below the main internal staircase to the Victoria Hall.

The organ, which had lain unused for some time, was removed and sold to the organ building firm J. W. Walker & Sons Ltd in 1957. The disposal of the organ caused a protracted discussion between Ealing Council and the Charity Commission over the use of the money which was eventually donated to local charities. With the organ no longer in the Hall there was space to simplify the stage, which previously had been on two levels, thereby enlarging the capacity of the hall.

In the 1960s modernisation of the halls took place with false ceiling panels and contemporary lighting. The Prince's Hall was converted into a tea room and was used as a staff canteen with access directly onto the street. This development significantly changed the character of the building.

=== Redevelopment ===
In July 2016, Ealing Council announced the need to reshape its services as a result of a large budget deficit. On 12 July 2016 an Ealing Council Cabinet Meeting approved the granting of a 250-year lease to hotel developer Mastcraft to turn most of the Town Hall and Victoria Hall into a ‘luxury’ hotel, with part of the building retained for municipal use. Continuing controversy led to an investigation started in 2018 by the Charity Commission to consider whether the Council has the right to sell the Trust's assets. On 27 November 2019, the Charity Commission published a draft 'Scheme' that would allow the council to sell off the Victoria Hall, which is held by a charitable trust, to a developer. The scheme prompted criticism from campaigners and concern about the limited amount of time available in a consultation period that would run over the Christmas period.

On 7 April 2020 the Charity Commission released its report on the consultation about the draft Scheme. The report referred extensively to objections by the Friends of the Victoria Hall and blocked the hotel deal unless and until significant changes were made.

On 22 March 2021 after further discussion with Ealing Council, the Charity Commission published a final draft of a Scheme for the Victoria Hall Trust. This attracted further criticism from local campaigners.

=== Legal Proceedings ===
The following month the Friends of the Victoria Hall lodged an appeal against the draft Scheme with the Charity Tribunal.

The case was to be heard by the Charity Tribunal on 27 September 2022 having been delayed partly because of an intervention by Ealing Council in November 2021.

In the event, the 27 September hearing was replaced by a two-hour Case Management Hearing to resolve procedural issues, with the substantive proceedings expected to take place later in 2022. On 13 December the Tribunal announced that the proceedings would take place between 20 and 22 February 2023.

Seven months after the hearing took place, on 21 September 2023 the Charity Tribunal published its decision. It partly upheld the appeal and rejected the draft Scheme. The court stated that it was not satisfied that the proposed rule changes adequately protected the interests of the Charity and ordered the Commission and Ealing Council to draw up a new Scheme in consultation with the appellants within 185 days of the decision.

The Charity Commission published a draft news scheme and launched a public consultation ending on 28 April 2024.

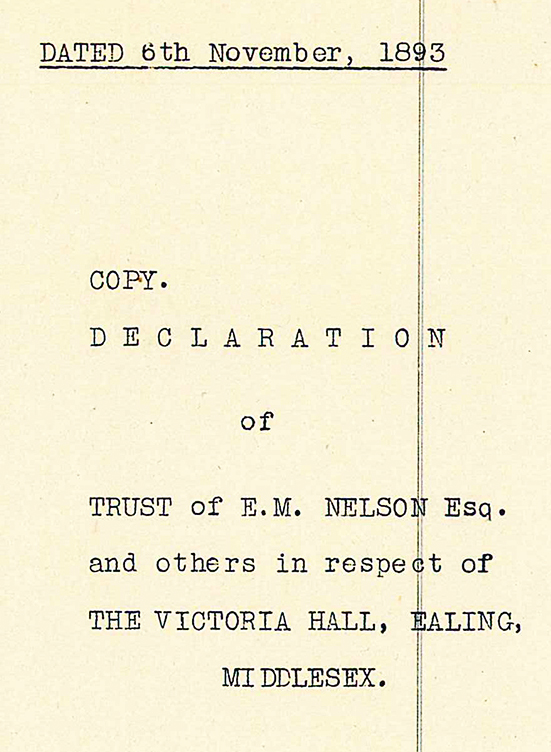
1893 Declaration of Trust

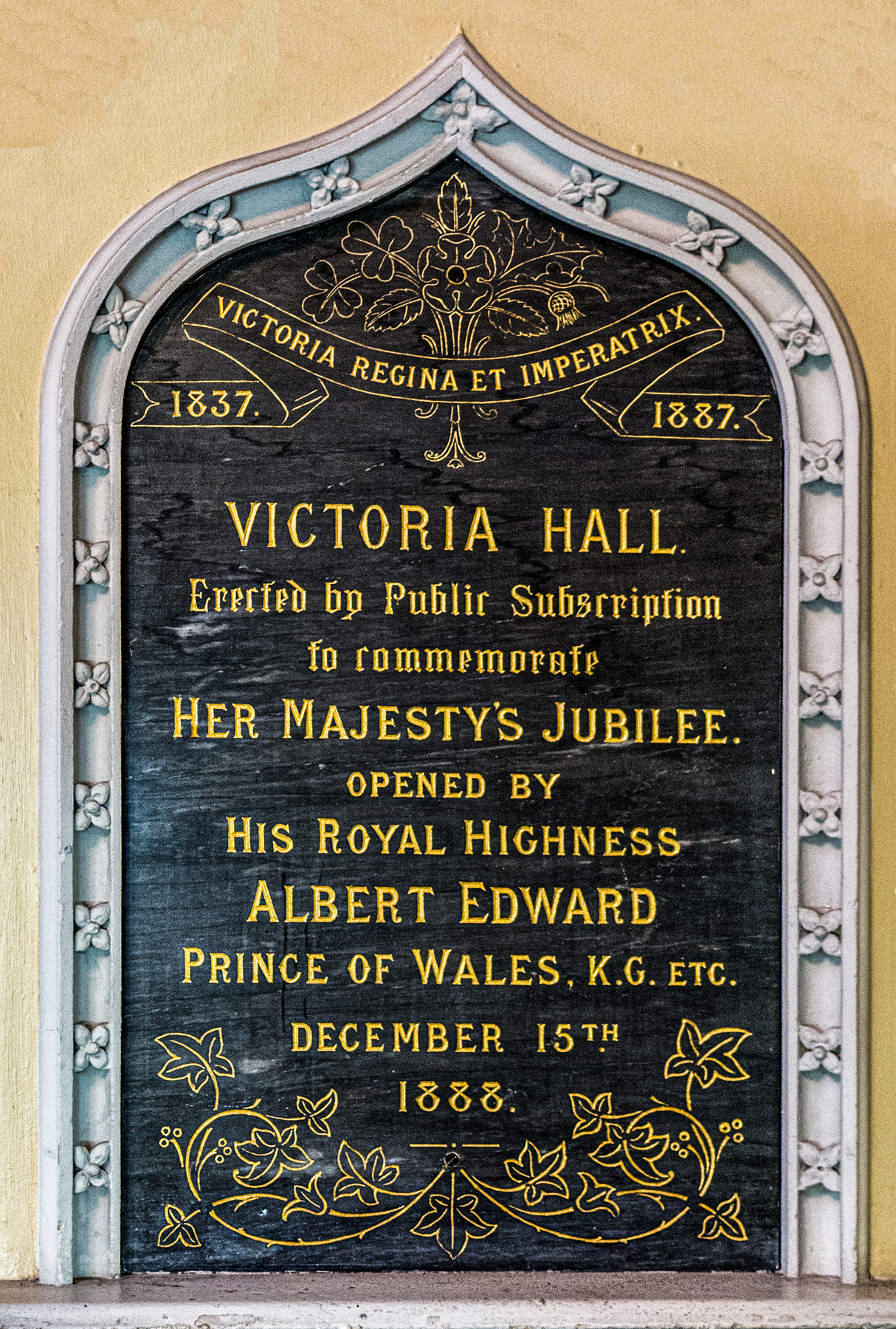
Commemorative plaque for the 1888 opening of the Victoria Hall

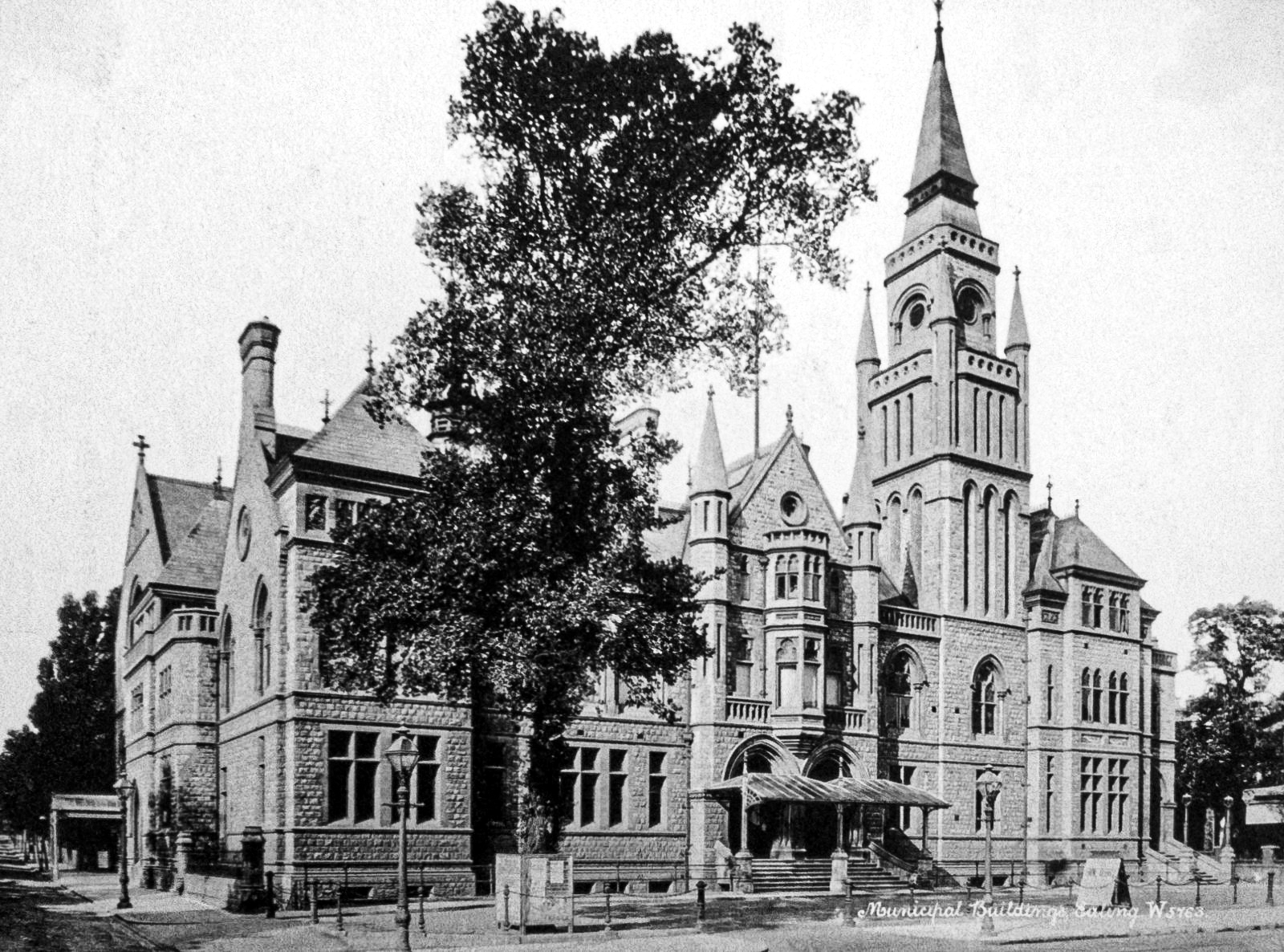
Ealing Town Hall & Victoria Hall circa 1930 showing the separate entrance (left) to the Victoria Hall
