= Edward Stanley Watkins =

British designer (1853–1928)

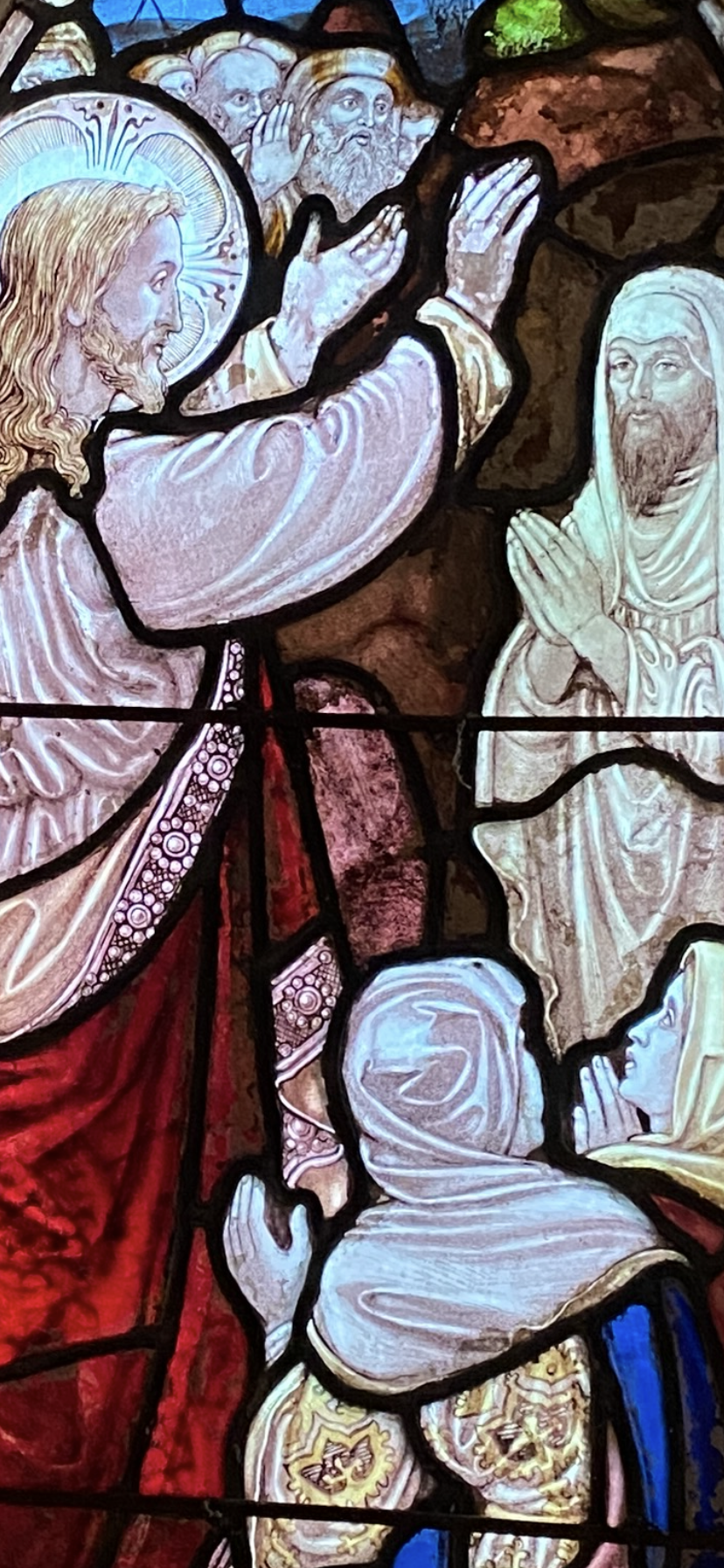
One of three windows designed by Watkins for South Ealing Cemetery Chapel in 1908

.

Edward Stanley Watkins (1853–1928) was a British designer and creator of ecclesiastical decorative art, celebrated for his stained glass windows, painted panels and mosaics, which can be found in churches across the United Kingdom.

Watkins, the son of a tailor, was born in Brompton and lived in London throughout his life. In the 1880s he lived at 22 Margaretta Terrace in Chelsea, but by 1909 he had moved to 39 Ranelagh Road in Ealing. In his lifetime, he was best known in the North of England, the Midlands and in London, but his work can also be found in the South of England. He is perhaps best known for his Oldham Parish Church reredos depicting Christ triumphant. Watkins worked in a broad range of artforms for churches, including stained glass, painted panels for reredoses and triptychs, marble and venetian mosaics, and memorial brasses.

== Work ==
- St James the Less Church, Dorney, Buckinghamshire, Stained glass (1920). Watkins designed a South West Nave window for the church in 1920. It depicts King Charles I, after a portrait by Anthony van Dyck, which at one tyme was in the collection of Windsor Castle. The King is crowned and holds the orb and sceptre, with a crown celestial palm branches above.
- Holy Trinity Church, Eckington, Worcestershire stained glass (1923). South east chancel window showing St Hilda and St George, designed by Watkins in 1923.
- Church of the Holy Ghost and St Stephen, Shepherds Bush, London, two windows (1906 and 1905). Watkins designed the east window in the sanctuary in 1906, and the west window of the north aisle in 1905.
- South Ealing Cemetery (formerly Ealing and Old Brentford Cemetery), Ealing, London, chapel stained glass (1908). Watkins created the glass for two memorial stained glass windows in the chapels designed by Ealing municipal architect Charles Jones.
- St Denys' Church, Sleaford, Lincolnshire, reredos (1906). Watkins designed the reredos in St Hugh's chapel.
- Oldham Parish Church reredos triptychs (1908). Watkins designed the triptych behind the high altar in 1908. It shows Christ in Majesty, in a neo-medieval style, including representations of leading historical figures of the church in England. Watkins also designed the triptych in the side chapel in north aisle.
- St Mellitus's Church, Hanwell, Ealing, London, stained glass (c. 1917). Watkins designed a side chapel window depicting the crucifixion, after artist Pietro Perugino, in memory of Scout Owen Harwood (d. 1917).
