= Ealing Town Hall =

Municipal building in London, England

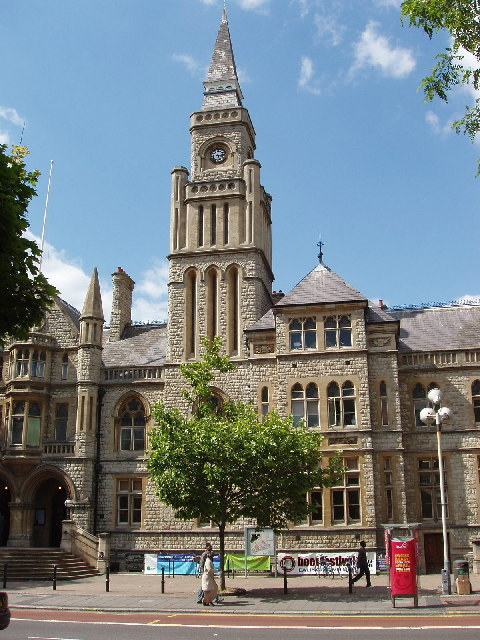
- Ealing Town Hall

- Shown in Ealing
- 51.5130°N 0.3076°W
- Location: Ealing, London, England

History
- Built: 1888

Site notes
- Architect: Charles Jones
- Architectural style: Gothic Revival style

Listed Building – Grade II
- Designated: 19 January 1981
- Reference no.: 1358791

Ealing Town Hall is a municipal building in New Broadway, Ealing, London, England. It is a Grade II listed building.

== History ==
The building was commissioned to replace the old town hall, designed by the town surveyor, Charles Jones, in The Mall. The site selected for the new building was open land owned by the Wood family, who were major landowners in the area.

The new building, which was also designed by Charles Jones and in the same style but on a much larger scale, was built by Hugh Knight and officially opened by the Prince and Princess of Wales on 15 December 1888. The design involved an asymmetrical main frontage with eleven bays facing onto New Broadway; the central section featured a double round arched doorway on the ground floor; there were oriel windows on the first and second floors and a gable above flanked by turrets; the design also featured an off-centre clock tower with lancet windows and a spire. A public hall intended for hosting events such as dances, wedding receptions and political rallies, known as the Victoria Hall, was erected on the north east corner of the site. Internally, the principal room was the original council chamber on the first floor which was renamed the "Nelson Room" in the 1930s in memory of Sir Edward Montague Nelson, a former mayor.

The building was significantly extended to the east, with a new octagonally towered entrance, to the designs of Ealing architect George Fellowes Prynne in 1930. Internally, the extension created a new council chamber and a mayor's parlour as well as a new public hall in the basement which became known as the "Queens Hall".

The building had been established as the offices of the local board of health and, after Ealing became an urban district in 1894, it became the new council offices. It went on to become headquarters of the Municipal Borough of Ealing in 1901 and continued to function as the local of seat of government when the enlarged London Borough of Ealing was formed in 1965.

A large "spanner-shaped" building designed by Sidney Kaye, Eric Firmin & Partners was erected to the west of the town hall in 1983 as additional accommodation for council officers and their departments. The new building was initially called the "Civic Centre". It was renamed "Perceval House" in 1990 after Spencer Perceval, Prime Minister from 1809 until his assassination in 1812, who had lived in Elm Grove in Ealing.

In July 2016, in the context of large budget deficit and the need to reshape its services, the council announced an agreement with a hotel developer to convert part of the Town Hall and the Victoria Hall into a boutique hotel. The development could also see a 28-storey tower block on the Perceval House site.

After a health and safety assessment identified concerns over the condition of the town hall, the council relocated its meetings to Perceval House in October 2023.

Works of art in the town hall include a portrait of King Edward VII by Henry John Hudson, a portrait of Spencer Perceval by an unknown artist and a portrait of Sir Edward Montague Nelson by Barnett Samuel Marks.
