= St Mellitus's Church, Hanwell =

Church in Hanwell, London, England

Coordinates: 51.5093°N 0.3349°W

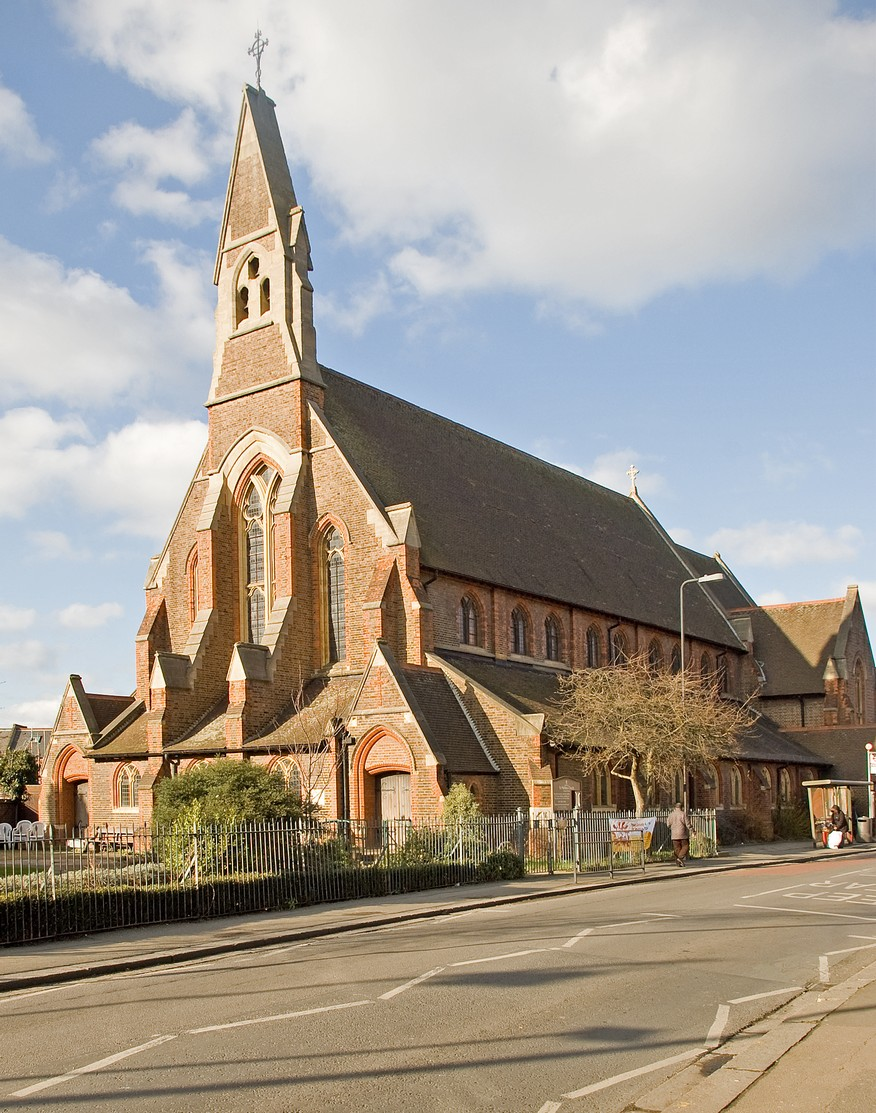
Church of St Mellitus, Hanwell

St Mellitus Church, Hanwell is a Grade II listed church located in the London Borough of Ealing . It is a Church of England church designed by architect Arthur Blomfield and built in 1909. The church is red brick with a buttressed west turret. The side chapel stained glass window was designed in 1917 by Ealing designer Edward Stanley Watkins. The window depicts the crucifixion, after artist Pietro Perugino, in memory of Scout Owen Harwood (d. 1917).
