= South Ealing Cemetery =

Cemetery in Greater London

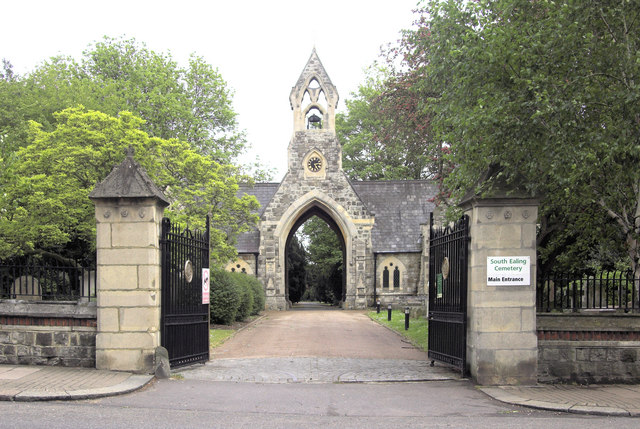
- South Ealing Road entrance
- Interactive map of South Ealing Cemetery

Details
- Established: 1861
- Location: Ealing, London
- Country: England
- Coordinates: 51.49668°N 0.30144°W
- Owned by: Ealing Council
- Size: 21 acres (8.5 ha)

South Ealing Cemetery (formerly Ealing and Old Brentford Cemetery) is a cemetery in Ealing established in 1861. It covers 21 acres.

The cemetery contains the Commonwealth war graves of 184 armed service personnel, as well as that of Pierre Francois Van Wesemael, a Belgian soldier of World War I.

The cemetery contains two Grade II listed chapels at the South Ealing Road entrance. The chapels are linked by a carriage arch, with clock and belfry above, designed by Ealing's prolific municipal architect Charles Jones (architect) and built in 1861. The stained glass in the chapel was designed in 1908 by the Ealing designer, Edward Stanley Watkins, who lived nearby on Ranelagh Road.

The Ealing Parks Foundation, working with local volunteers and Ealing Council, is leading a project to renovate the chapels and restore use of the cemetery grounds for nature and public wellbeing.

== Notable burials ==
- Col. Osmond Barry (1855–1930), army officer. Grave 62 1F
- Captain John Dibbs (1790–1872), master mariner
- Stanisława Kuszelewska-Rayska (1894–1966), Polish writer
- James Herbert Lorrain (1870–1944), British missionary
- Juliusz Mieroszewski (1906–1976), Polish journalist
- Fredrick (d. 1901) and Margaret Miller (1854–1926), parents of Agatha Christie. Grave 12/13 GE
- G. Cosens Prior (1855–1937), solicitor and social reformer
- Halina Szymańska (1906–1979), Polish spy
- Spencer Horatio Walpole (1806–1898), politician. Grave 4,5,6 AA
- James Watts (1903–1961), politician
