= G. Cosens Prior =

English solicitor and social reformer (1855–1937)

The Reverend G. Cosens Prior
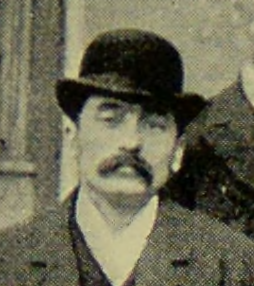
- Prior in 1894
- Born: 1855; Chichester, West Sussex, England
- Died: 1937 (aged 81); Brentford, Middlesex, England
- Resting place: Ealing and Old Brentford Cemetery
- Occupations: Solicitor; social reformer
- Organizations: Portsmouth Gospel Temperance Union; Portsmouth Vegetarian Society; Vegetarian Federal Union; Order of the Golden Age
- Known for: Temperance and vegetarianism activism
- Criminal charges: Misappropriation of client funds (1904)
- Criminal penalty: Five years' penal servitude (1904)
- Spouse: Clara Gertrude Wilkin (m. 1880; died 1918)
- Children: 9

Signature
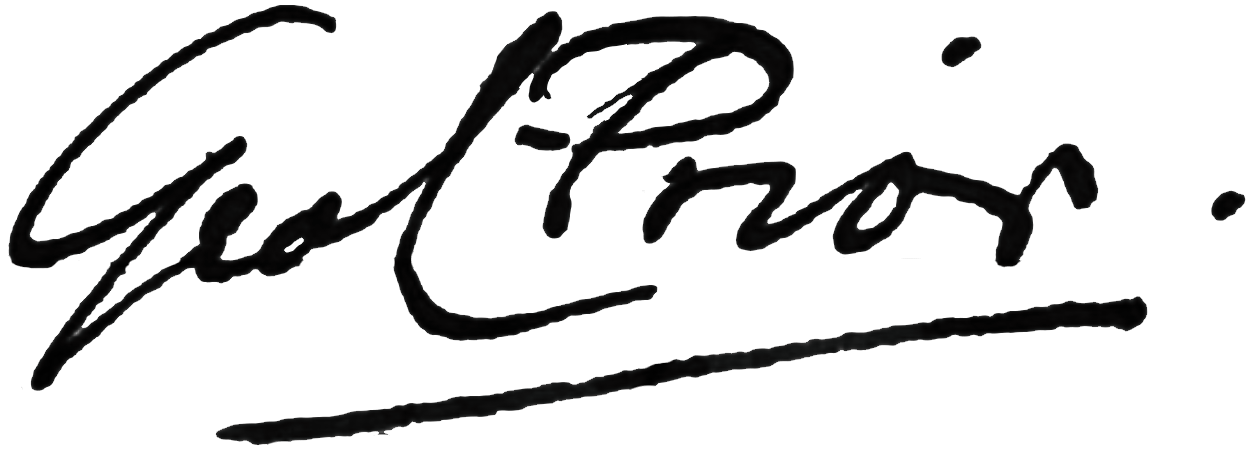

George Cosens Prior (1855–1937) was an English solicitor, Unitarian minister, and social reformer. Based in Portsmouth, he headed one of the city's older law firms, acted as solicitor to several trusts, maintained a private practice, and worked as a notary public. He also served as minister at Portsmouth High-Street Unitarian Church. Prior was active in the temperance movement and served as president of the Portsmouth Gospel Temperance Union. He adopted vegetarianism in 1889 on ethical grounds, became president of the Portsmouth Vegetarian Society, and lectured on vegetarianism. He served as chairman of the committee of the Vegetarian Federal Union and as honorary solicitor for the Order of the Golden Age from 1901 to 1903. In 1904, after declaring bankruptcy, he was convicted of misappropriating client funds and sentenced to five years' penal servitude.

== Biography ==
=== Early life ===
George Cosens Prior was born in Chichester in the final quarter of 1855. His parents were John Woods Prior, who founded the family's wool-stapling business in Chichester, and Amelia Prior (née Underdown).

=== Legal and religious work ===
Prior headed one of the oldest law firms in Portsmouth, acted as solicitor to several trusts, and maintained a private practice. He also worked as a notary public and served as minister at Portsmouth High-Street Unitarian Church.

=== Temperance and vegetarianism ===
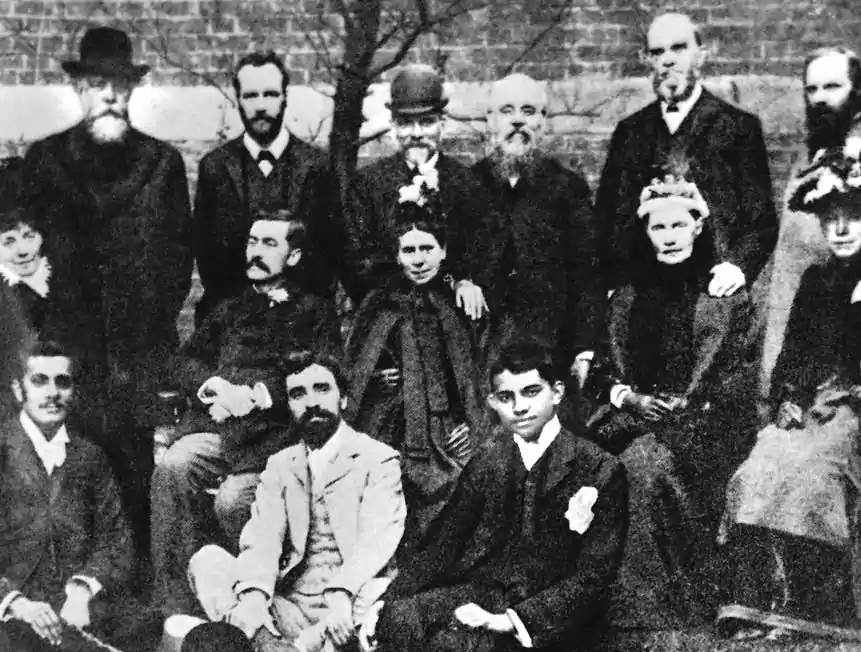
Prior (centre, second from left) at a London Vegetarian Society meeting in Portsmouth, May 1891

Prior was active in the temperance movement for many years and served as president of the Portsmouth Gospel Temperance Union.

Prior adopted vegetarianism in 1889 on ethical grounds. He became active in the Portsmouth Vegetarian Society, serving as its president, and lectured on vegetarianism. He also served as chairman of the committee of the Vegetarian Federal Union. From 1901 to 1903, he acted as honorary solicitor for the Order of the Golden Age.

=== Criminal conviction ===
In 1904, Prior was charged with misappropriating client funds during bankruptcy proceedings. He was convicted and sentenced to five years' penal servitude.

=== Personal life and death ===
Prior married Clara Gertrude Wilkin on 4 March 1880 at the parish church of Gaywood, King's Lynn. She was a vegetarian, and the couple raised nine vegetarian children. Clara died in 1918, aged 67.

Prior died in Brentford, Middlesex, aged 81, in the second quarter of 1937. He was buried at Ealing and Old Brentford Cemetery on 15 April.

== See also ==
- History of vegetarianism
- Vegetarianism in the Victorian era
- Temperance movement in the United Kingdom
