= Church of the Holy Ghost and St Stephen =

Catholic church in London, England

Coordinates: 51.500988°N 0.241076°W

The Church of the Holy Ghost and St Stephen is a Catholic church at 44 Ashchurch Grove, Shepherds Bush, London, W12 9BU.

The church and its attached presbytery is a Grade II listed building, built in 1903–04 and designed by the architect-priest Alexander Scoles.

The east window in the sanctuary was designed in 1906, and the west window of the north aisle in 1905, both by the Ealing designer Edward Stanley Watkins.
