= Old Town Hall, Ealing =

Municipal building in London, England

Old Town Hall
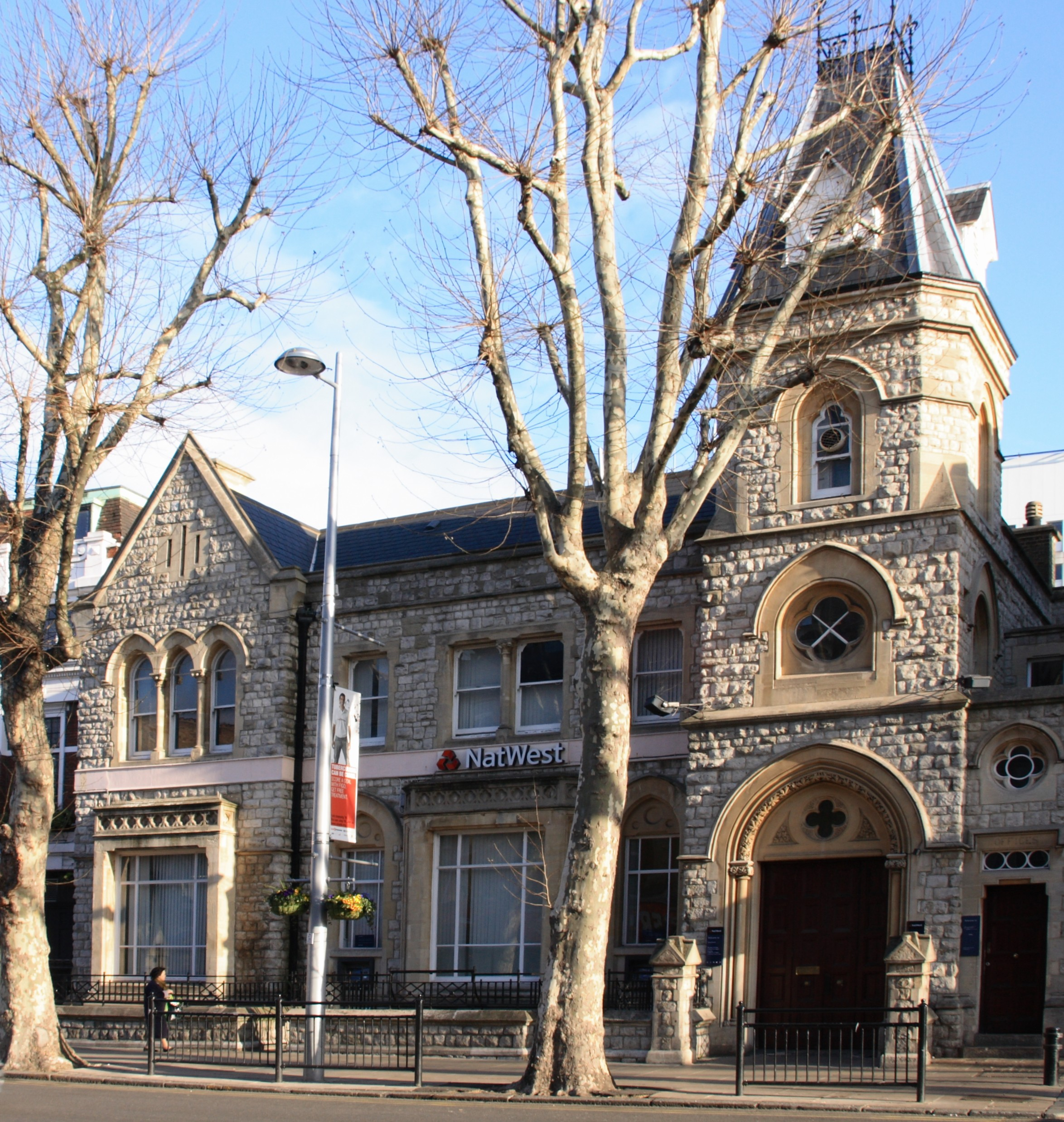
- The building in 2008

- Shown in Ealing
- 51.5142°N 0.3014°W
- Location: The Mall, Ealing

History
- Built: 1874

Site notes
- Architect: Charles Jones
- Architectural style: Gothic Revival style

Listed Building – Grade II
- Official name: National Westminster Bank
- Designated: 19 January 1981
- Reference no.: 1189300

The Old Town Hall is a former municipal building in the Mall in Ealing, London. The building, which is currently used as a branch of National Westminster Bank, is a Grade II listed building.

== History ==
The building was commissioned by the Ealing Local Board which was established in 1863. The site the board selected, which was on the north side of The Mall, was just south of Ealing Station on the District Railway.

The building was designed by the town surveyor, Charles Jones, in the Gothic Revival style, built in rubble masonry and was completed in 1874. The design involved an asymmetric main frontage of six bays facing onto The Mall. The first bay on the left, which was slightly projected forward, featured a bay window on the ground floor, a tri-partite mullioned window on the first floor and a gable above. The third bay also contained a bay window on the ground floor. The fifth bay, which was also slightly projected forward, featured a three-stage tower; there was an arched doorway flanked by colonettes supporting an archivolt in the first stage, an arched window containing a quatrefoil in the second stage and a lancet window in the third stage, all surmounted by a mansard roof with dormers and brattishing. The right-hand bay contained a doorway surmounted by a panel inscribed with the word "Offices" and by another quatrefoil. The other bays were fenestrated by arched windows on the ground floor and by sash windows on the first floor. Internally, the principal room was the board room, which was located behind the bay windows on the ground floor.

The architectural historian, Nikolaus Pevsner, liked the design and referred to it as "more daring than most suburban municipal buildings of this date".

However, with a decade, the building was considered too small for municipal use and a new town hall, also designed by Charles Jones, was completed on New Broadway in 1888. The local board decided to dispose of the old town hall which was converted for use as a bank. It became the local branch of London and County Bank in 1889. It was then rebranded as London County and Westminster Bank in 1909, Westminster Bank in 1923 and National Westminster Bank in 1970.
