= Charles Jones (architect) =

English architect (1830–1913)

Charles Jones (1830 – 24 August 1913) was Ealing's first architect, engineer and surveyor. He held these posts for fifty years, and is known for his work on civic buildings.

== Biography ==
Born at Beccles in Suffolk, Jones first started working for the Municipal Borough of Ealing on a commission only basis in 1863 until he was given a salaried post in 1882, which he held until he retired in 1913, shortly before his death on 24 August of the same year.

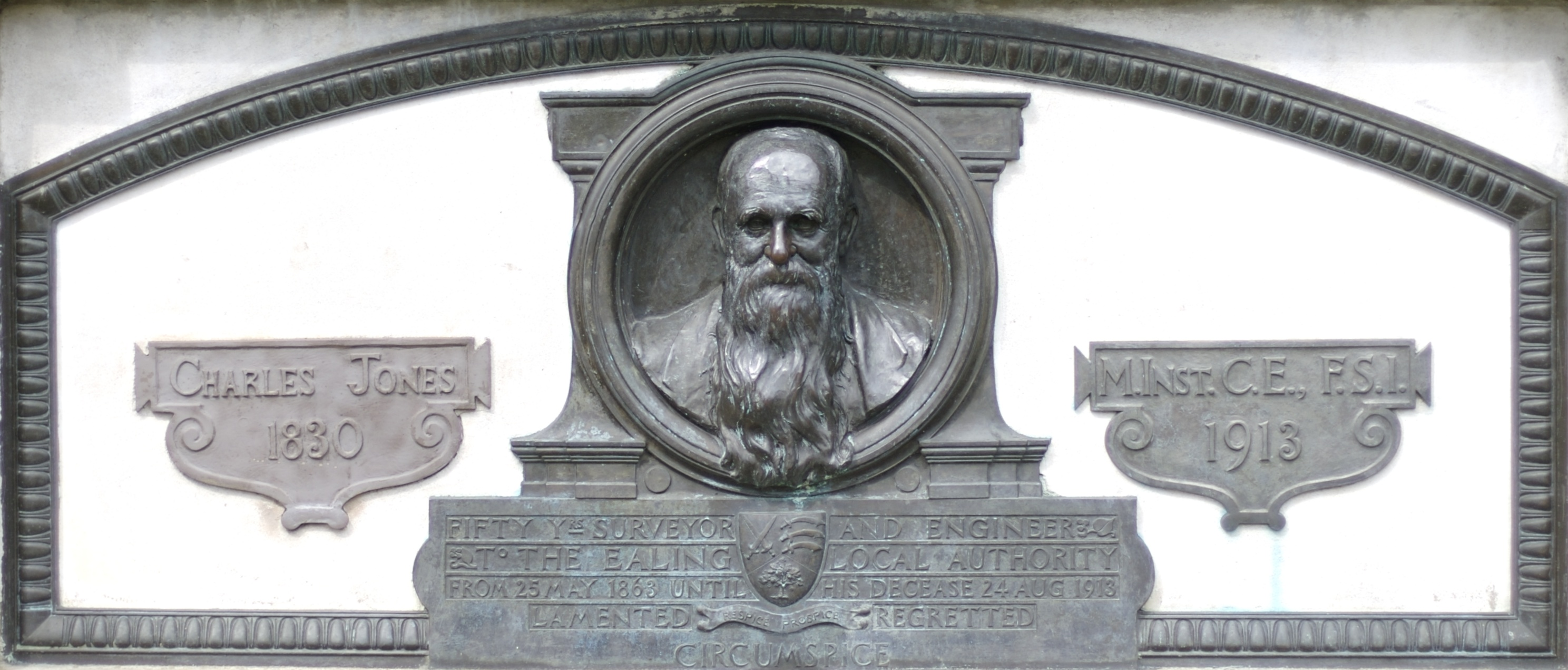
Charles Jones memorial plaque in Walpole Park, Ealing

=== Civic buildings ===
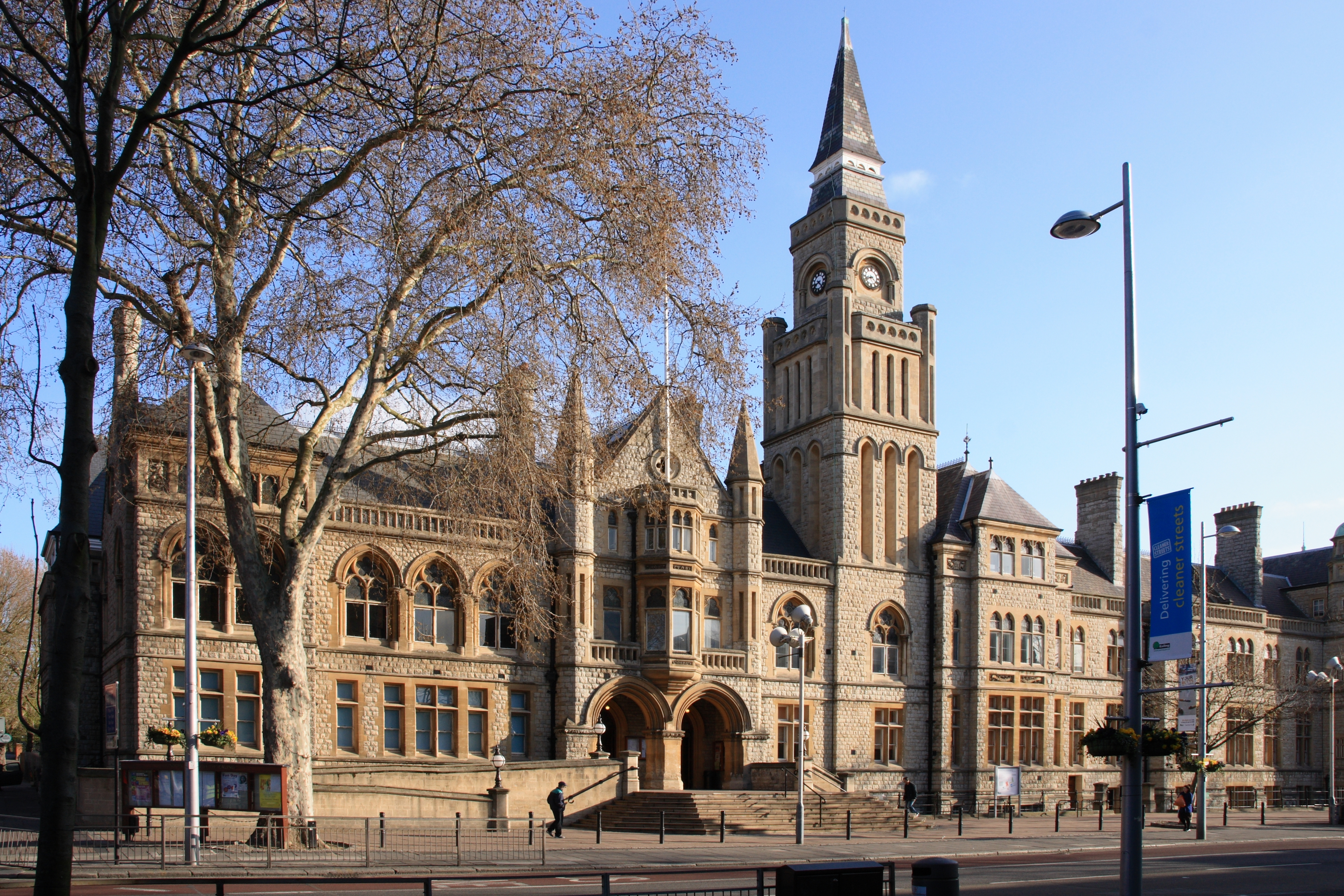
Ealing Town Hall (1888)

His most prominent work is that of Ealing Town Hall. Before building could go ahead, Jones also had to find the land and negotiate the purchase. In 1885 he persuaded Edward Wood to sell the whole meadow which lay between the Uxbridge Road and the Great Western Railway cutting and alongside the very old road of Longfield Avenue. Being on such a busy thoroughfare, next to the new town centre and so close to both of Ealing's railway stations it was very much a prime site. Even so, Jones was able to persuade Wood to part with the land for only £4,000 (well below its market value) on the understanding that it would always remain council property for public buildings guaranteed by Deed of Covenant. This was indeed fortunate, as it allowed the building to be later extended on its east side and to have room behind for three municipal public swimming baths (Wood went on to donate a further £500 for the building of Victoria Hall).

It is in the Gothic Revival style with Kentish rag-stone walls. Fine-grained Bath stone has been used for the moulding around the windows. It was completed for a cost of £16,000. English Heritage has classified it as a Grade II listed building.

As the population grew, so did the need for a large function room. The necessary funds for building were found by public subscription. In order to secure generous patronage from wealthy residents, Jones needed to make it look as grand as possible. Also, he needed to span a reasonably wide expanse of area without recourse to vertical roof supports. Jones solved both requirements by basing the roof construction on medieval 14th century baronial architecture. It features wall-posts supporting moulded hammer-beams, and curved braces. The king posts are hidden above the ceiling, which is on the level of the horizontal ties, these stop the roof collapsing in upon itself. By this means, Jones was able to span a width of 45½ feet. The hall is some 74-foot (23 m) long, with a stage at one end. Around the top of the room are the shields and emblems of the various parishes and former municipal councils which amalgamated to form the present borough. The window are glazed with stained glass. As usual for halls of this type, a room was also built below (the Princes Room), not just for the economic advantage of using the same land footprint, but also to ensure that the room above could be held at a reasonable temperature. Otherwise the sudden increase in moisture from a large crowd of people would cause heavy condensation to form upon the chill floor. It is built onto the back of the town hall's municipal buildings. The wall facing the street is in the same Gothic style to match that of the town hall. It was named Victoria Hall to celebrate Queen Victoria's 1887 Golden Jubilee. It was officially opened on 15 December 1888 by Edward, Prince of Wales (later Edward VII). Adjoining the town hall, it is part of the same Grade II listed structure.

The original council offices before this, which he also designed in Gothic, lay 500 yards (460 m) further east along the Uxbridge Road. The premises are now occupied by a bank. English Heritage has classed it as a Grade II listed building.

=== Civic infrastructure ===
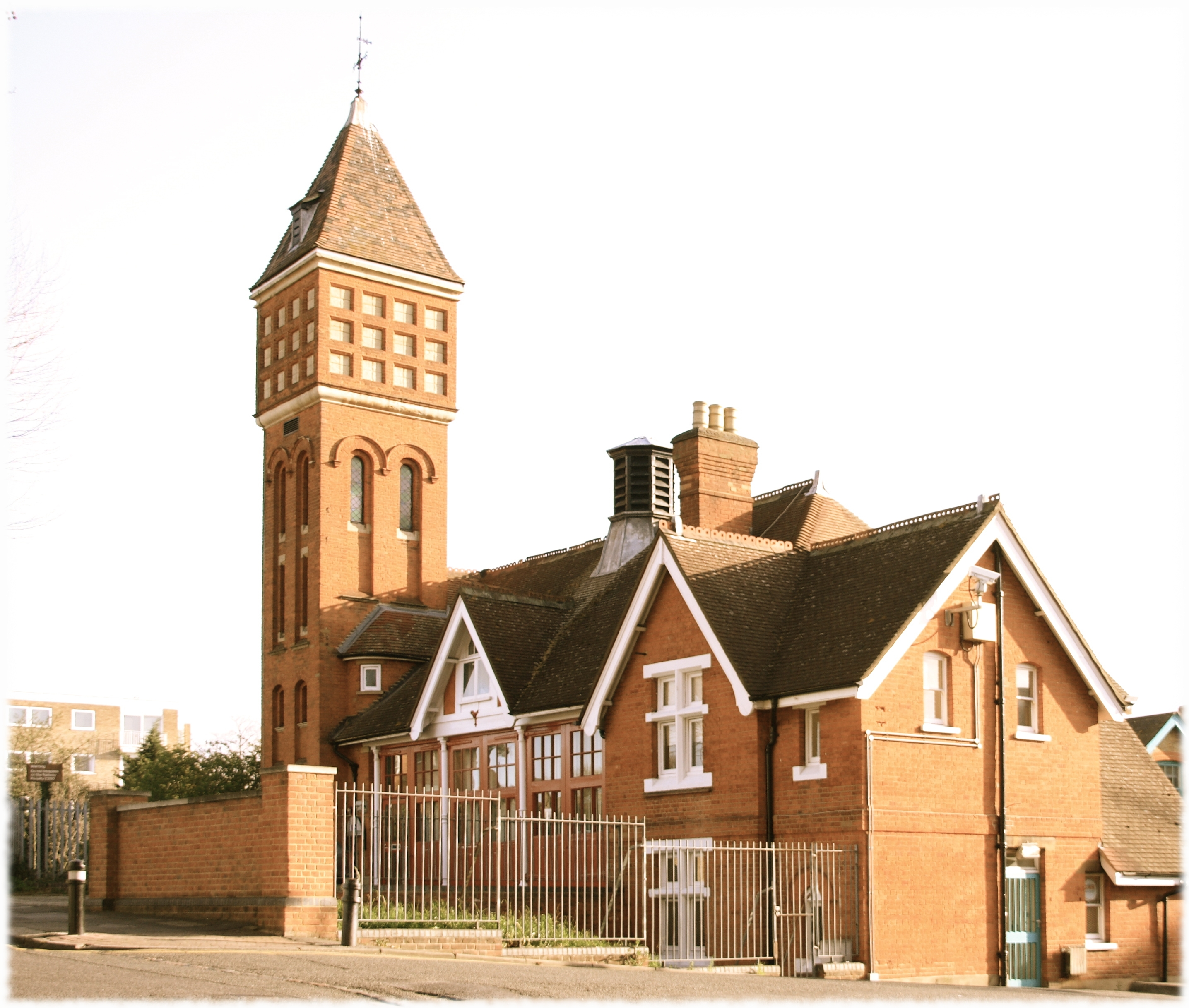
Former fire engine station

His first work for the council in 1863 was to lay out the towns first proper sewage system. As the Thames at this time suffered from gross pollution from raw sewage he also designed a sewage farm to treat the effluent; this was built at Clayponds down Occupation Lane off the South Ealing Road. Over the next two decades this was incrementally expanded to cope with the rapidly expanding population.

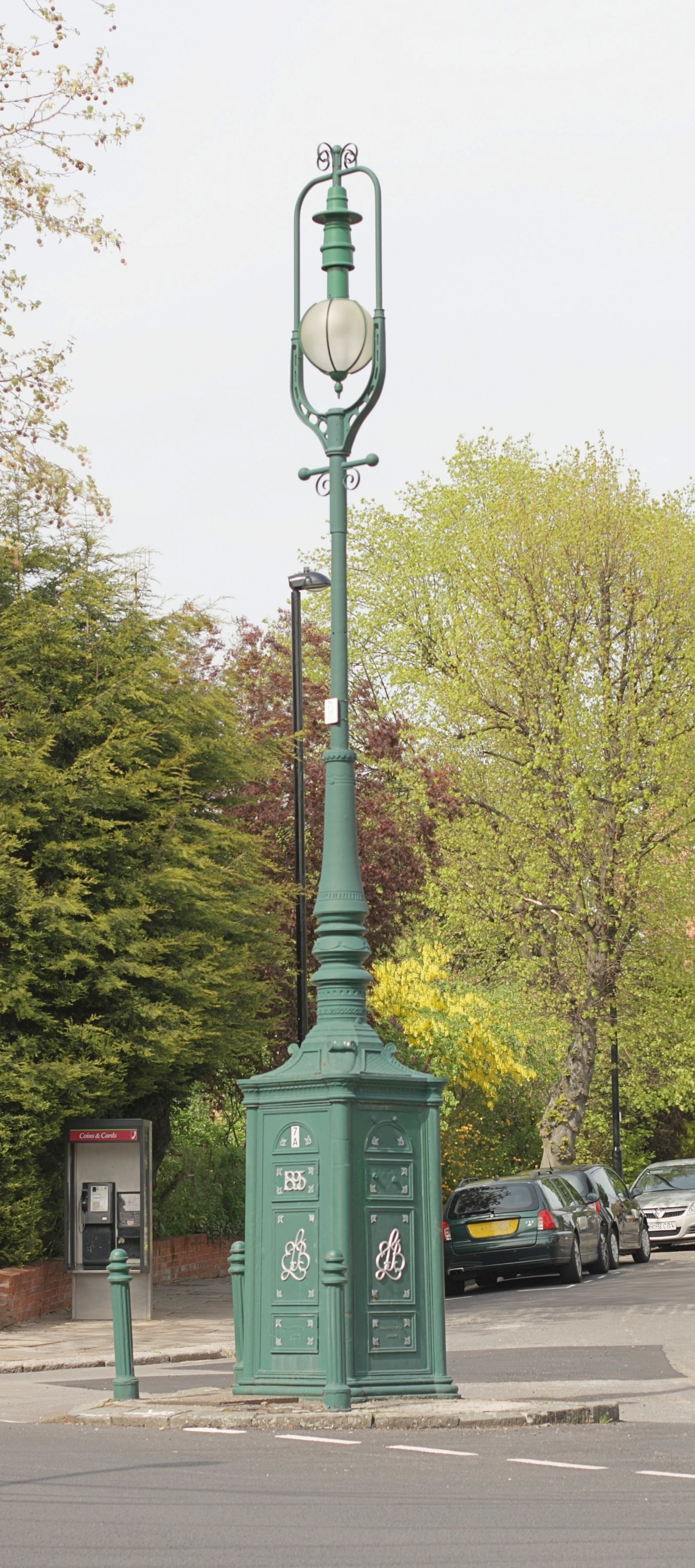
Ealing lamp post inscribed 1905

To go behind the new Town Hall he designed a fire engine station. The building is still in existence but has long ceased to be used for its original purpose. Whilst not thought notable enough to warrant statutory protection, it has nevertheless been 'locally listed' by Ealing Council as being of architectural interest.

Another task he was charged with was to design and oversee the first Electricity Generating Station and distribution system which came on line in 1894 and provided Ealing with its first electric street lighting. This was also situated down Occupation Lane. The sludge from the sewage farm next door, was filtered out and burnt here as fuel.

During this time the council was also purchased properties from local notables which came with large plots of open land. Jones oversaw the work of turning these into public pleasure parks. He was also responsible for having the chestnut tree avenues planted on Ealing Common which gave it much of its present-day character.

He also designed the redevelopment of Pitzhanger Manor in order that it could become a free public lending library. Opening in April 1902, it remained Ealing's Central Library until it moved in 1985. Because of Jones's sympathetic alterations to the original site, it was possible to then restore the house to reflect as accurately as practical, how it would have looked in the 1800s. Today it is a museum and art gallery open to the public at no charge. English Heritage has classed it as a Grade I listed building.

=== Churches and Chapels ===
An early design of Jones's was the Congregational Church (1860) on Ealing Green (now the United Reformed and Methodist Church). Style: Gothic.

Methodist Church (1869) at the north end of Windsor Road just before the Junction of Uxbridge Road. Style: Gothic. This now a Polish Roman Catholic Church of 'Our Lady Mother of the Church'. English Heritage has classified it as a Grade II listed building.

Jones also designed the two chapels at South Ealing Cemetery, Ealing, formerly Ealing and Old Brentford Cemetery. Old Brentford Cemetery. The Grade 2 chapels, built in 1861, South Ealing Road entrance. The chapels are linked by a porte cochère with clock and belfry above. The chapels contain stained glass by the Ealing designer Edward Stanley Watkins, who lived nearby on Ranelagh Road, created in 1908.

=== Schools ===
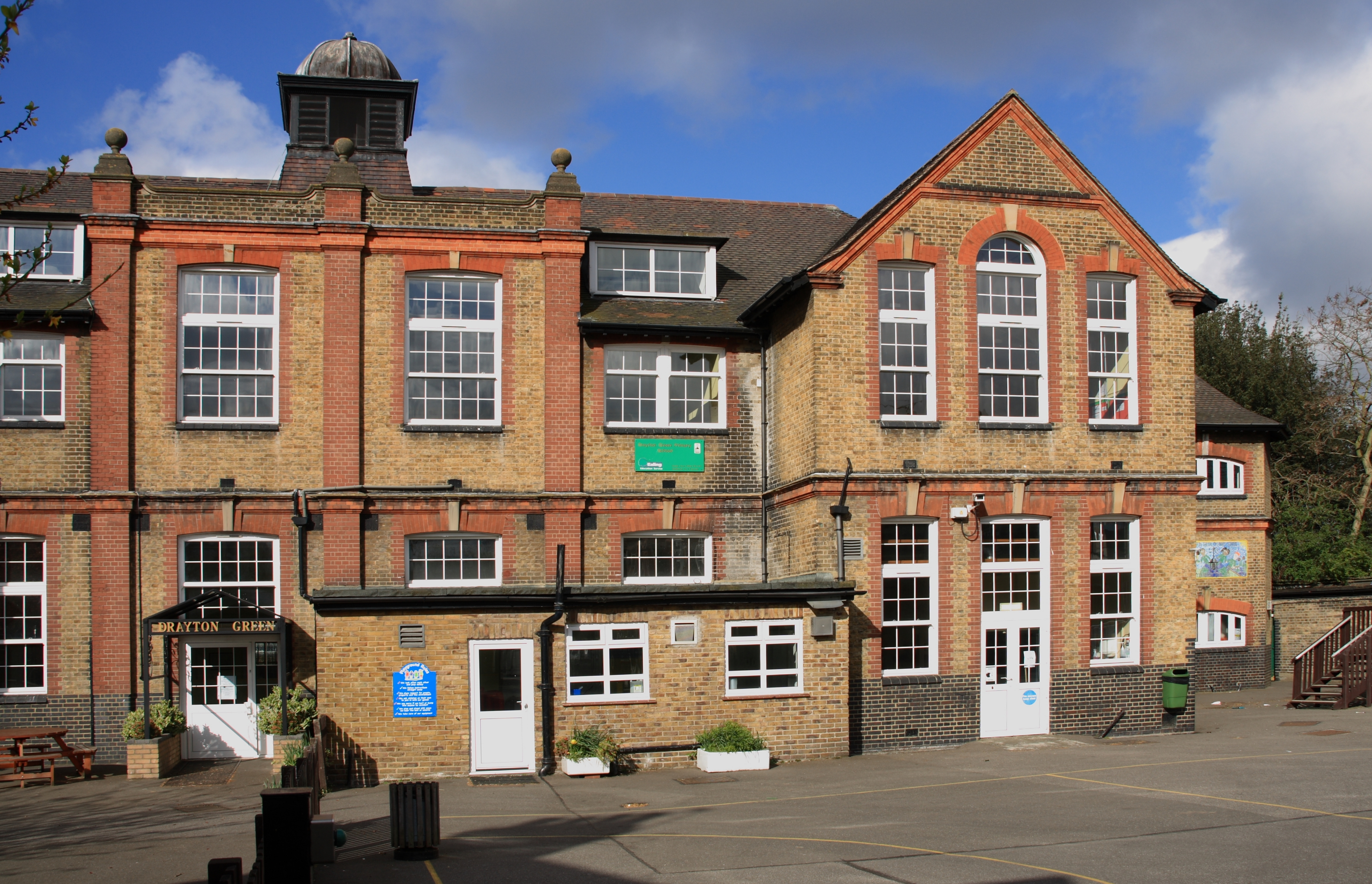
Drayton Green (1908)

To comply with the first education acts the council had to use whatever buildings were available in which to hold lessons. Jones then set about designing the borough first purpose built State schools. He undertook the designs of Drayton Green (1908) (see below), Lammas (1910)[demolished], Little Ealing (1905)[see below], North Ealing Primary School (1911) in Pitshanger Village, and Northfields (1905) [demolished].

==== Drayton Green ====
Drayton Green Primary School (pictured) at the terminus of Drayton Grove, Ealing W13 has been built in yellow brick, with red brick dressing and featuring keystoned window arches. A centrally placed, square-shaped, part-louvered, cupola bell house sits on the red terracotta tiled roof. It provides a very good example of typical late-Victorian architecture.

==== Little Ealing Primary School ====
Little Ealing Primary School, on Weymouth Avenue, is a single story, yellow brick building with key-stoned arched windows and terracotta tiled roof. The main hall is baronial in style with wall posts supporting the hammer beams and curved braces. At each end of the long corridor, white hexagonal ventilation cupolas sit in the roof. From the horizontal ties upwards both these roofs are glazed.

=== Private projects ===
He took advantage of rapidly increasing housing costs by accepting board membership of the Ealing, Acton & Hanwell Permanent Benefit Building Society.

When land up at Castle Bar belonging to Kent House, the former home of Prince Edward, Duke of Kent and Strathearn, was sold off, Jones purchased much of it for his own private house building projects. He did this in the face of competition from the newly formed housing associations such as the Ealing Tenants Association who were buying up land, on which to build cheap houses for the working classes.

=== Other posts ===
He was also a member of the first Local Board of Health. His membership was necessary, along with other engineers, politicians and medical scientists to take measures to resist the spread of water borne disease.

He was a founding member and the first honorary secretary of the Institute of Municipal and County Engineers.

== Publications ==
Jones published three books:

- 20 Years Development of a London Suburb. 1884.
- Ealing: From Village to Corporate Town. Publ. Spaul, 1904.
- Decade of Progress 1901–1911. 1911.

== Further examples of his surviving work ==
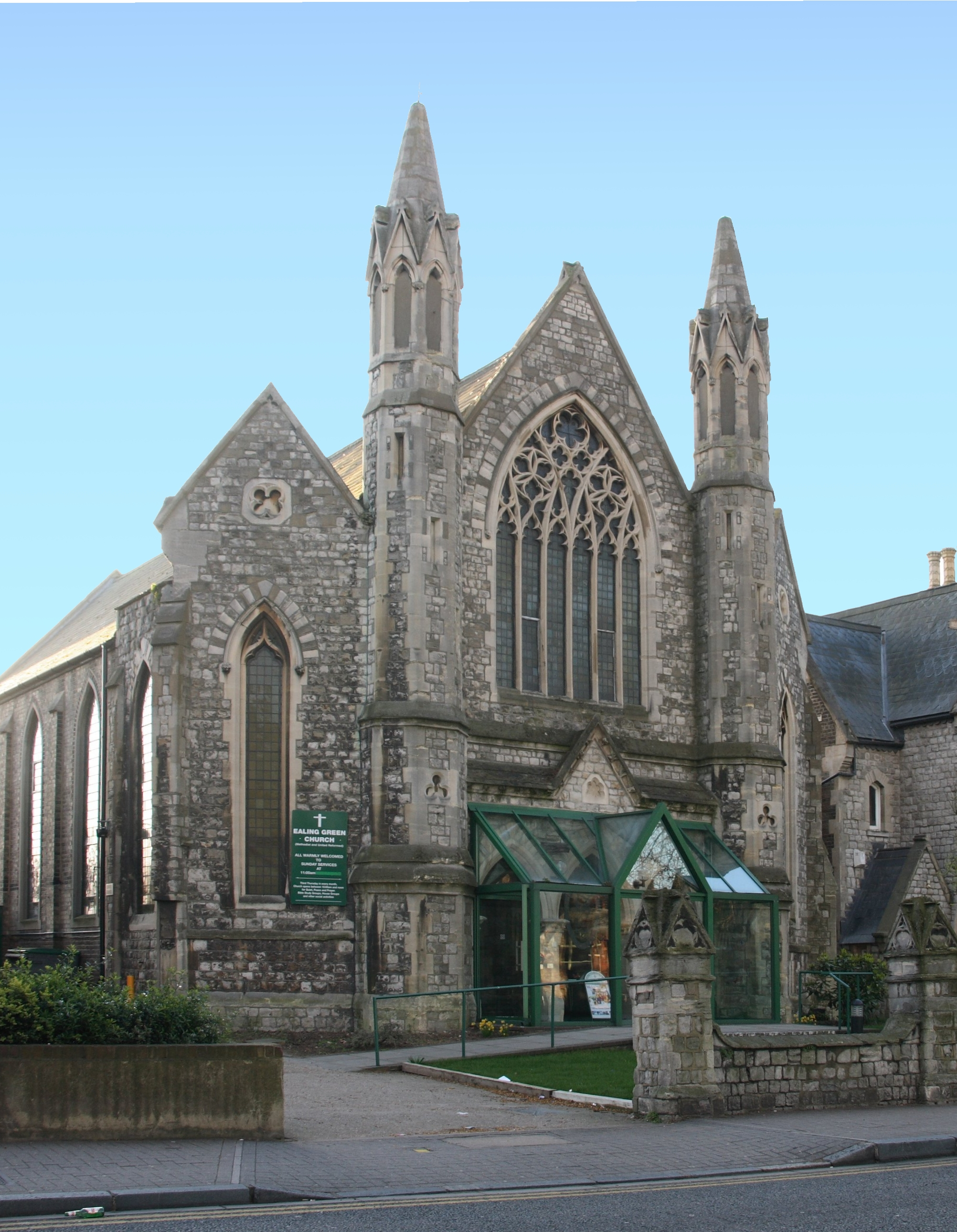
Congregational Chapel overlooking Ealing Green

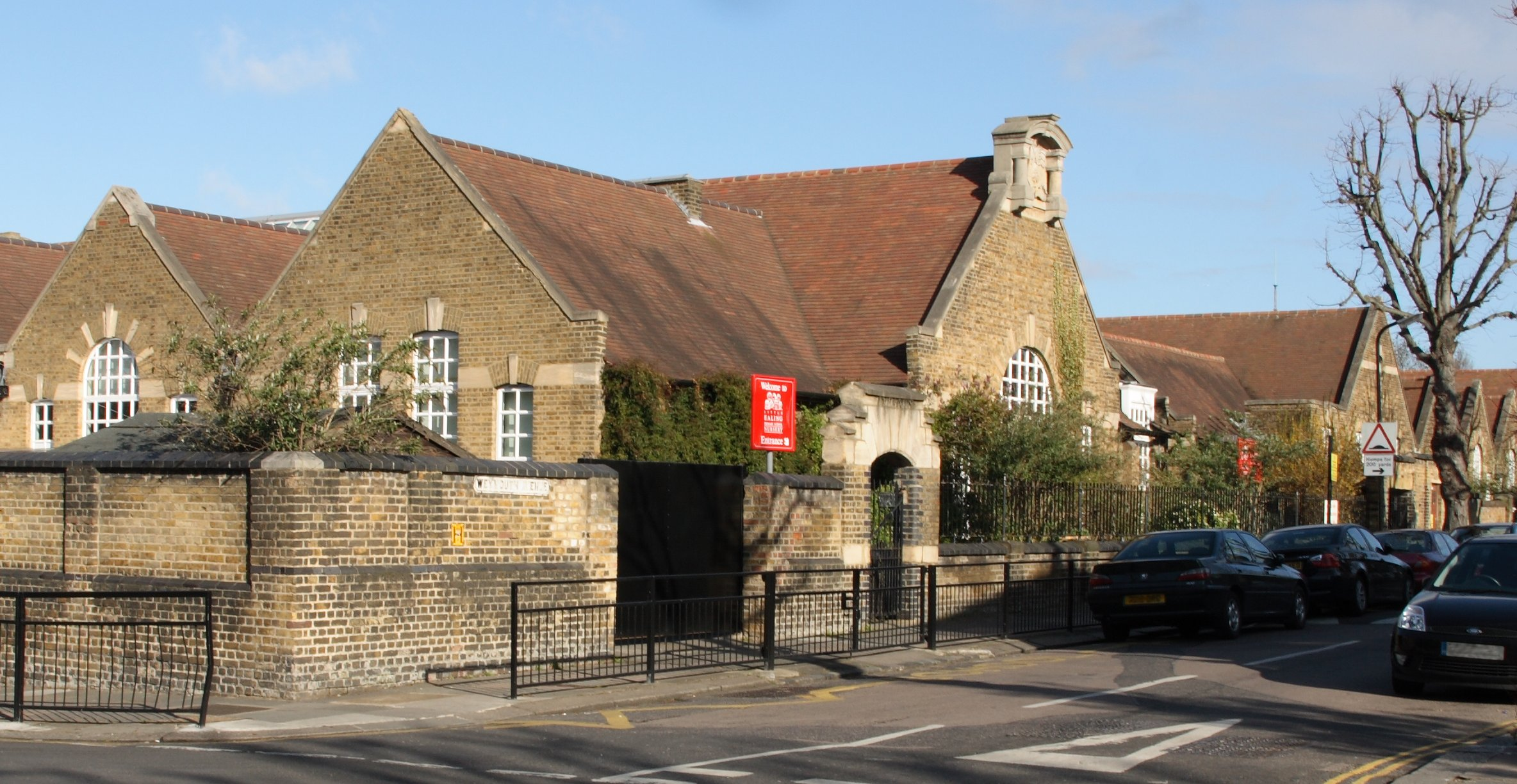
Little Ealing Primary School (1905)

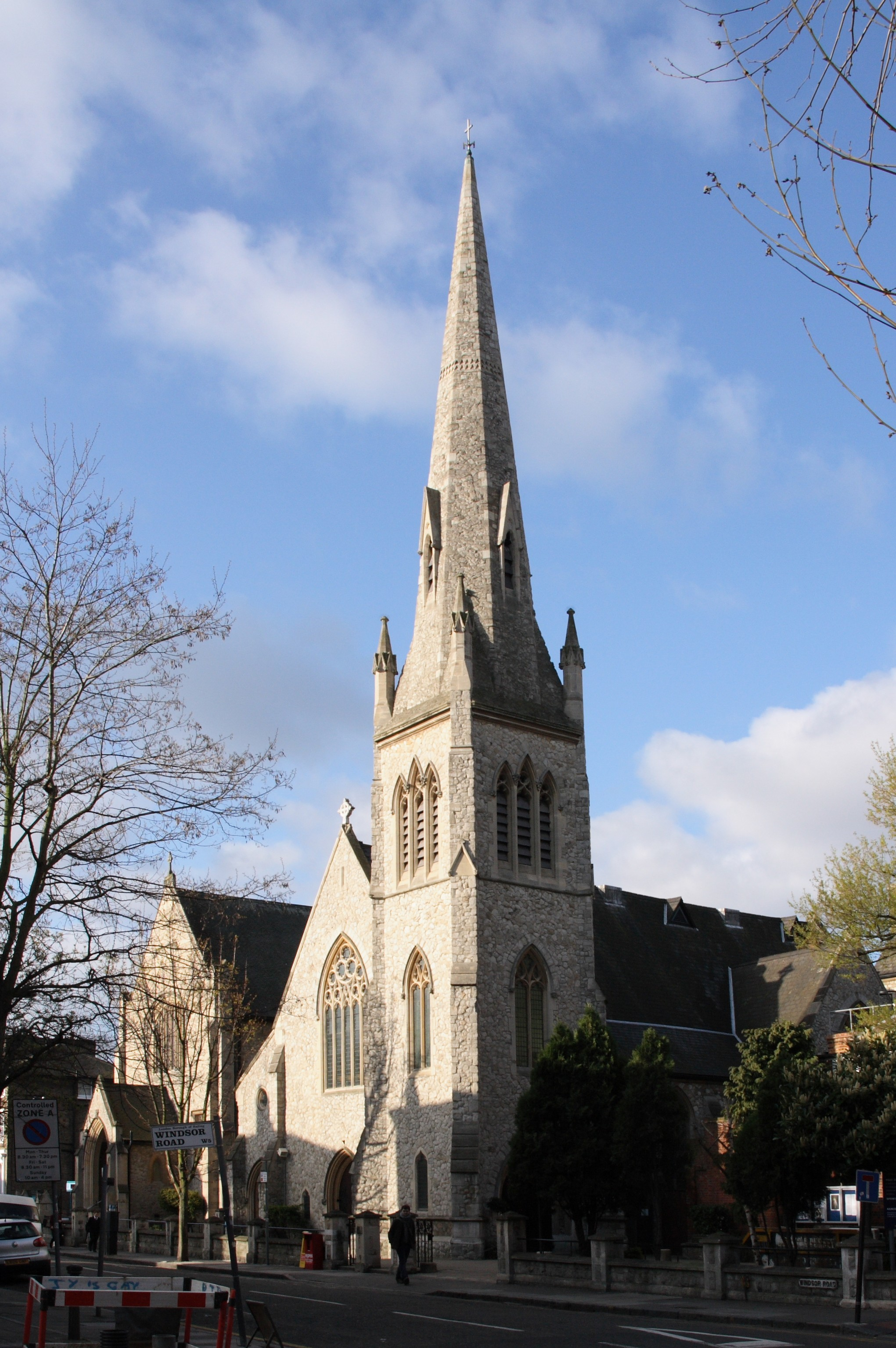
Originally a Methodist church (1869). North end of Windsor Road

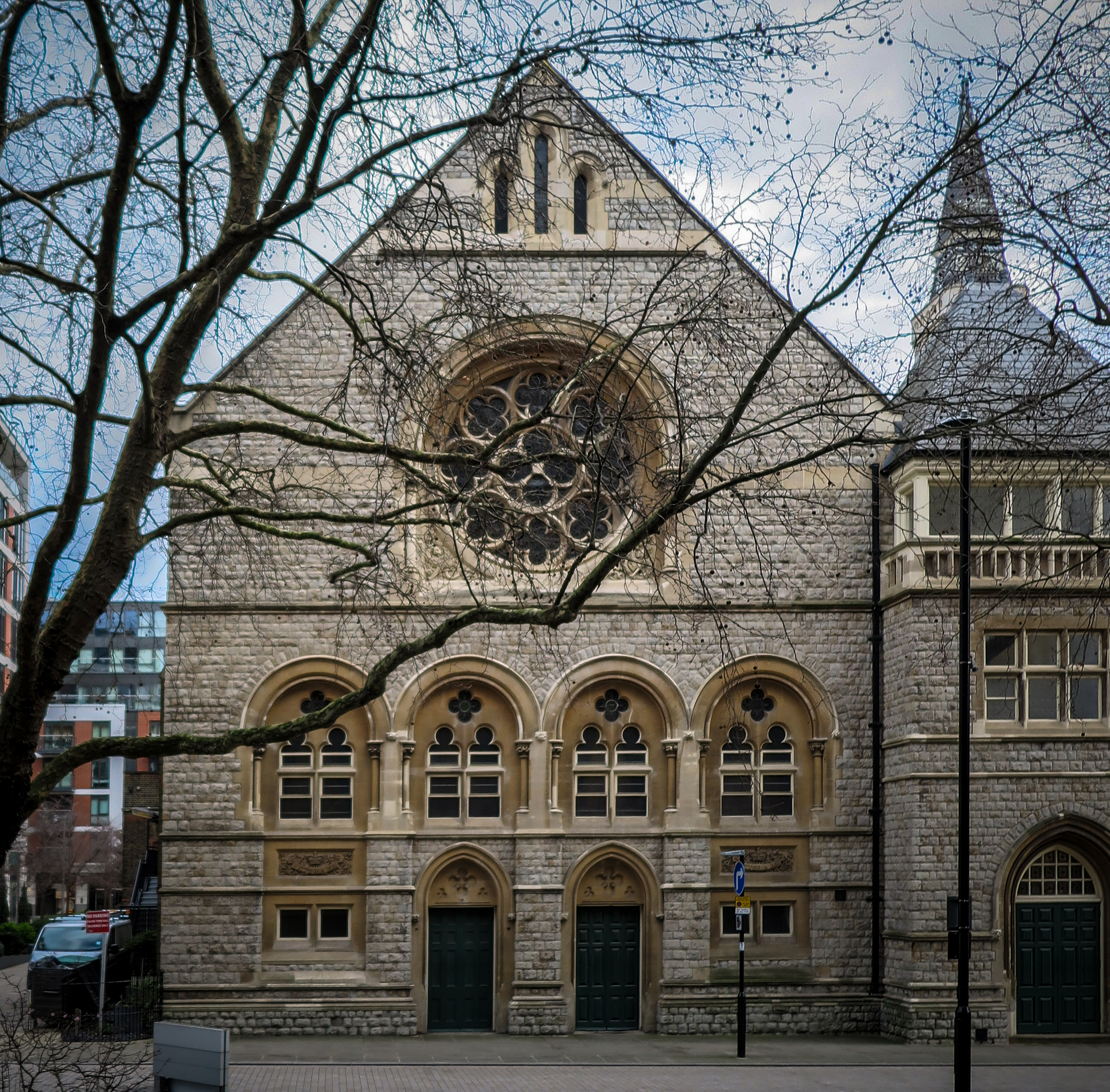
The Victoria Hall (1888), built by public subscription next to Ealing Town Hall

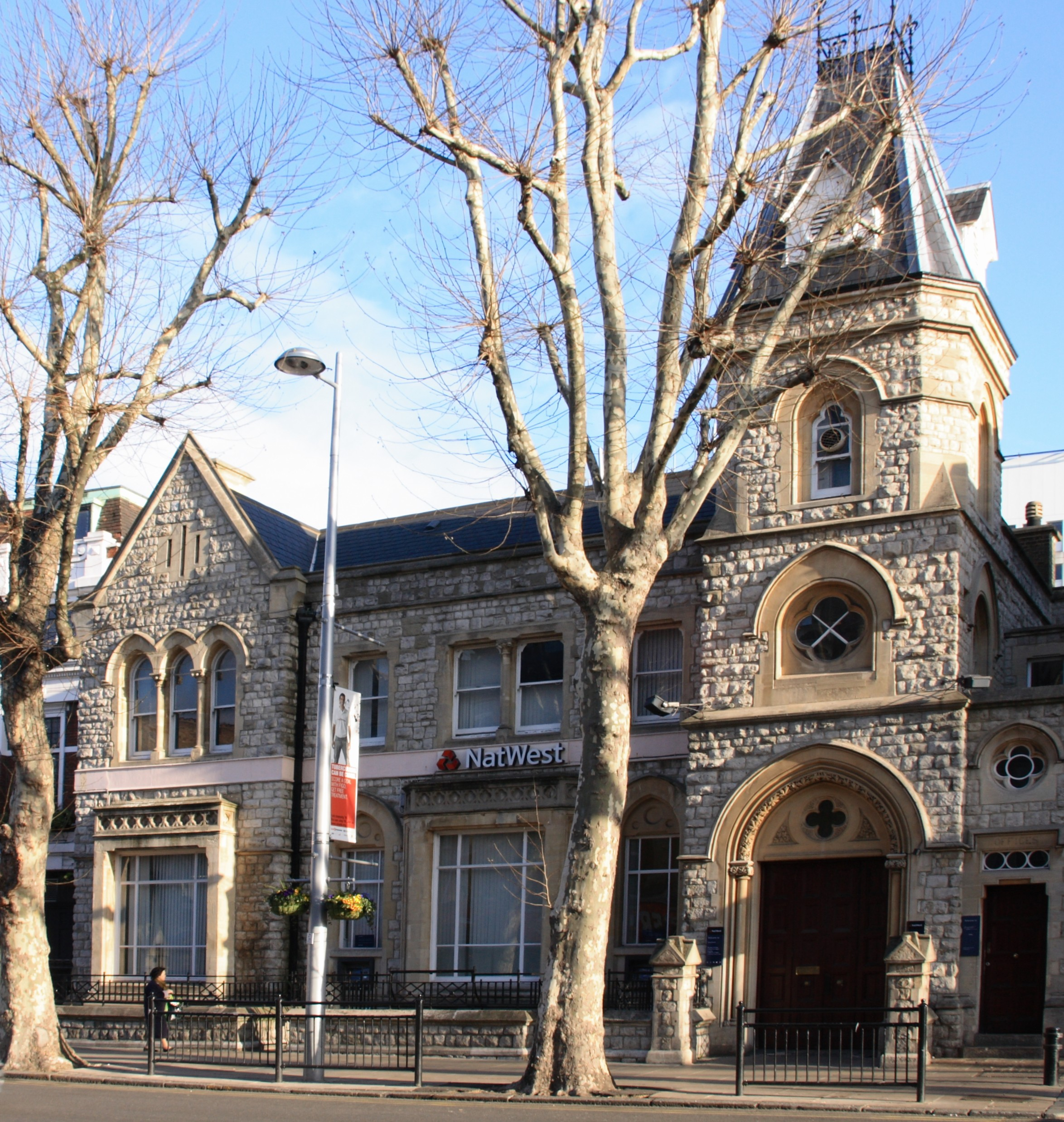
Former Town Hall
