= Academic Laurel =

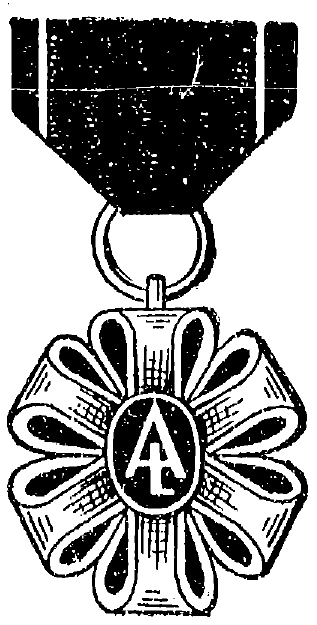
- Drawing of the Academic Laurel
- Date: February 21, 1934; 91 years ago
- Country: Poland
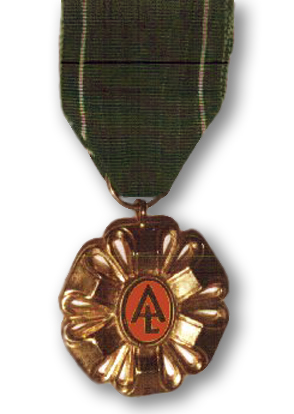
- Golden Laurel badge

The Academic Laurel (Polish: Wawrzyn Akademicki) is a Polish decoration established in 1934 during the period of the Second Polish Republic, awarded annually to individuals who have made significant contributions to literature, as proposed by the Polish Academy of Literature.

== History and awarding ==
The decoration was established by the decree of the Minister of Religious Affairs and Public Education on February 21, 1934.

The Laurel was awarded to individuals who have contributed to Polish literature through:

1. outstanding literary creativity,
2. outstanding activity in the field of care for Polish literature,
3. outstanding editorial or organizational work in the field of literature,
4. promoting a passion for Polish literature,
5. promoting literacy,
6. contributing to the increase of interest in Polish literary works.

The award was bestowed by the Minister of Religious Denominations and Public Enlightenment upon the recommendation of the Polish Academy of Literature.

Recipients of the Laurel received, in addition to the badge, a diploma certifying the award with a detailed description of the merits recognized.

Recipients of the Laurel covered the actual costs of producing the decoration.

The decoration had two levels:

- I degree – Golden Academic Laurel
- II degree – Silver Academic Laurel

== Description ==
The Golden Laurel badge, with a diameter of 38 mm, consisted of six gold arms joined by openwork fields; in the middle, at the intersection of the arms, there was an elliptical field covered with red enamel, on the enamel there was a silver monogram "AL", the reverse side was gold and smooth.

The Silver Laurel badge, with a diameter of 38 mm, consisted of six silver arms joined by openwork fields; in the middle, at the intersection of the arms, there was an elliptical field covered with yellow enamel, on the enamel there was a silver monogram "AL", the reverse side was silver and smooth.

The ribbon for both degrees of the Laurels was green with white stripes, 37 mm wide. The Laurel was attached to the ribbon with a gold or silver ring.

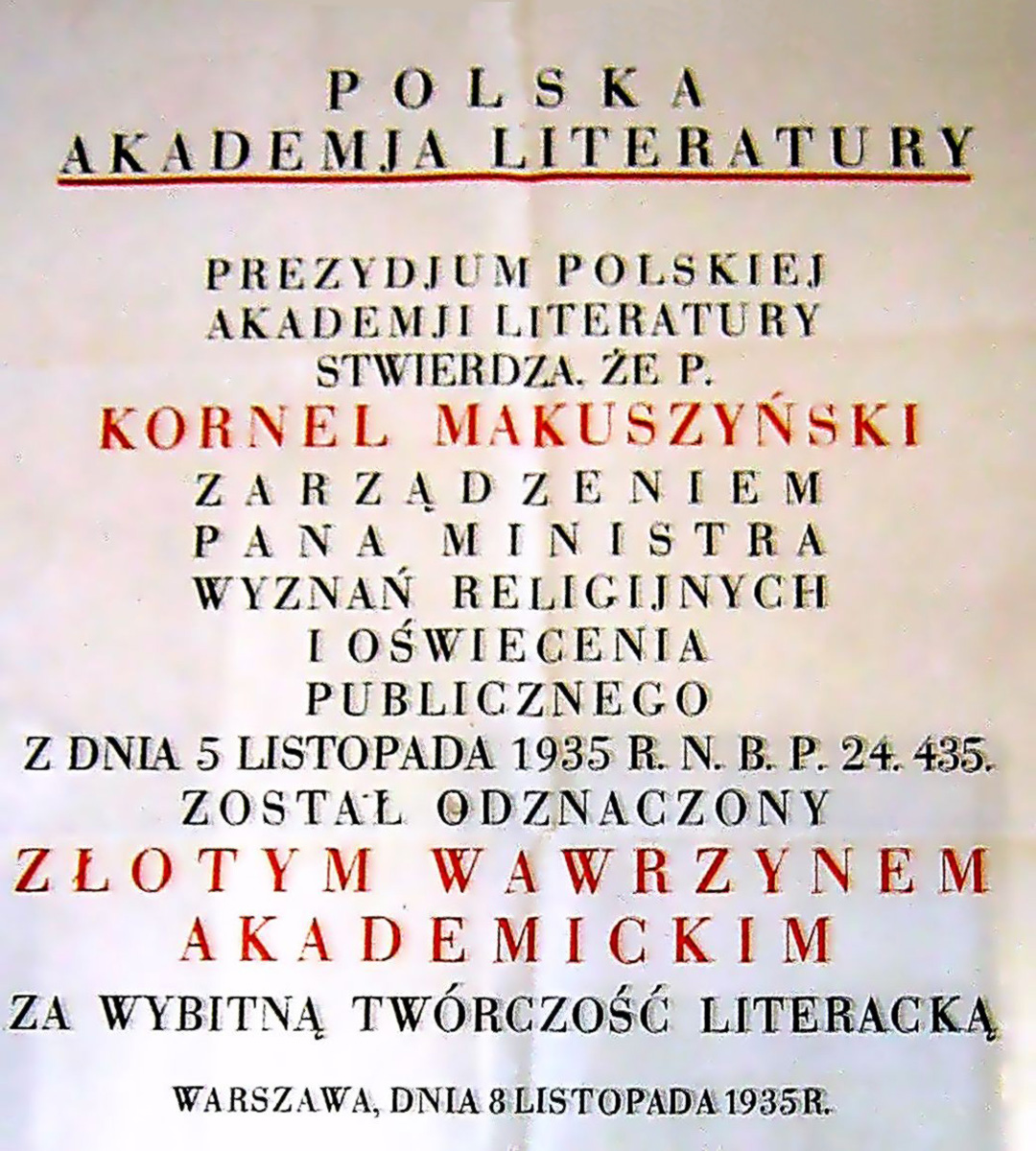
Diploma awarding the Golden Laurel of the Polish Academy of Literature to Kornel Makuszyński on November 5, 1935

The ribbon bar had the same color and was the same for both degrees of the decoration.
