= Jesting Pilate =

The phrase Jesting Pilate can be:

- a phrase coined by Francis Bacon in the opening sentence of his essay Of Truth (read at Wikisource)
- a name for the Biblical verse to which Bacon was referring, namely John 18:38
- the title of a book by Aldous Huxley
- the title of a book by Sir Owen Dixon
