= Sheila Lochhead =

British prison visitor (1910–94)

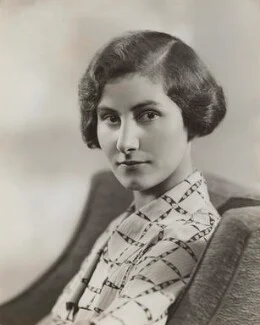
- MacDonald in 1936
- Born: Sheila Ramsay MacDonald; 7 December 1910; Bloomsbury, London, England
- Died: 22 July 1994 (aged 83); Swansea, Wales
- Resting place: Holy Trinity Church, Spynie, Morayshire, Scotland
- Other name: Sheila Lochhead
- Education: North London Collegiate School
- Alma mater: Somerville College, Oxford
- Occupation: Prison visitor
- Political party: Labour
- Spouse: Andrew Lochhead (m. 1948)
- Children: 3
- Parents: Ramsay MacDonald (father); Margaret Gladstone (mother)
- Relatives: Malcolm MacDonald (brother); Ishbel Peterkin (sister)

Sheila Ramsay Lochhead (née MacDonald; 7 December 1910 – 22 July 1994) was a hostess, prison visitor and writer. In 1924 her widowed father, Ramsay MacDonald, became Britain's Prime Minister. Her sister Ishbel MacDonald became his political hostess, and then Sheila took on the role. Sheila later became a prison visitor, leading the National Association of Official Prison Visitors for three years.

== Biography ==
Lochhead was born Sheila MacDonald in 1910. She was one of six children of Ramsay MacDonald, the future Prime Minister of the United Kingdom, and his wife Margaret MacDonald (née Gladstone), a social reformer and women's rights activist.

MacDonald was head girl at the North London Collegiate School. She then studied Philosophy, Politics, and Economics at Somerville College, Oxford where she won a hockey blue and graduated with a 2:1. She reportedly hoped, at one time, to enter politics.

In 1924, her widowed father became Prime Minister of the United Kingdom. Along with her sister Ishbel, she became her father's hostess while he was at 10 Downing Street, including when he was sent abroad on missions. Sheila found time to do this while also working at Wormwood Scrubs Prison.

Sheila married Andrew Van Slyke Lochhead in 1948. The couple had three children together and lived in Swansea, Wales.

Lochhead had worked in prisons and she wanted them reformed. She was chair of the National Association of Official Prison Visitors for three years and wrote a history of prison visiting in 1993 titled "Outside-in: A Study of Prison Visiting". She and her husband lived, and she organised a home for the homeless and a hostel for people who had been in prison.

Lochead died in 1994, a year after a stroke left her half paralysed. Her husband Andrew survived his wife for eight years, and died in 2002.
