= Ishbel Peterkin =

British politician (1903–1982)

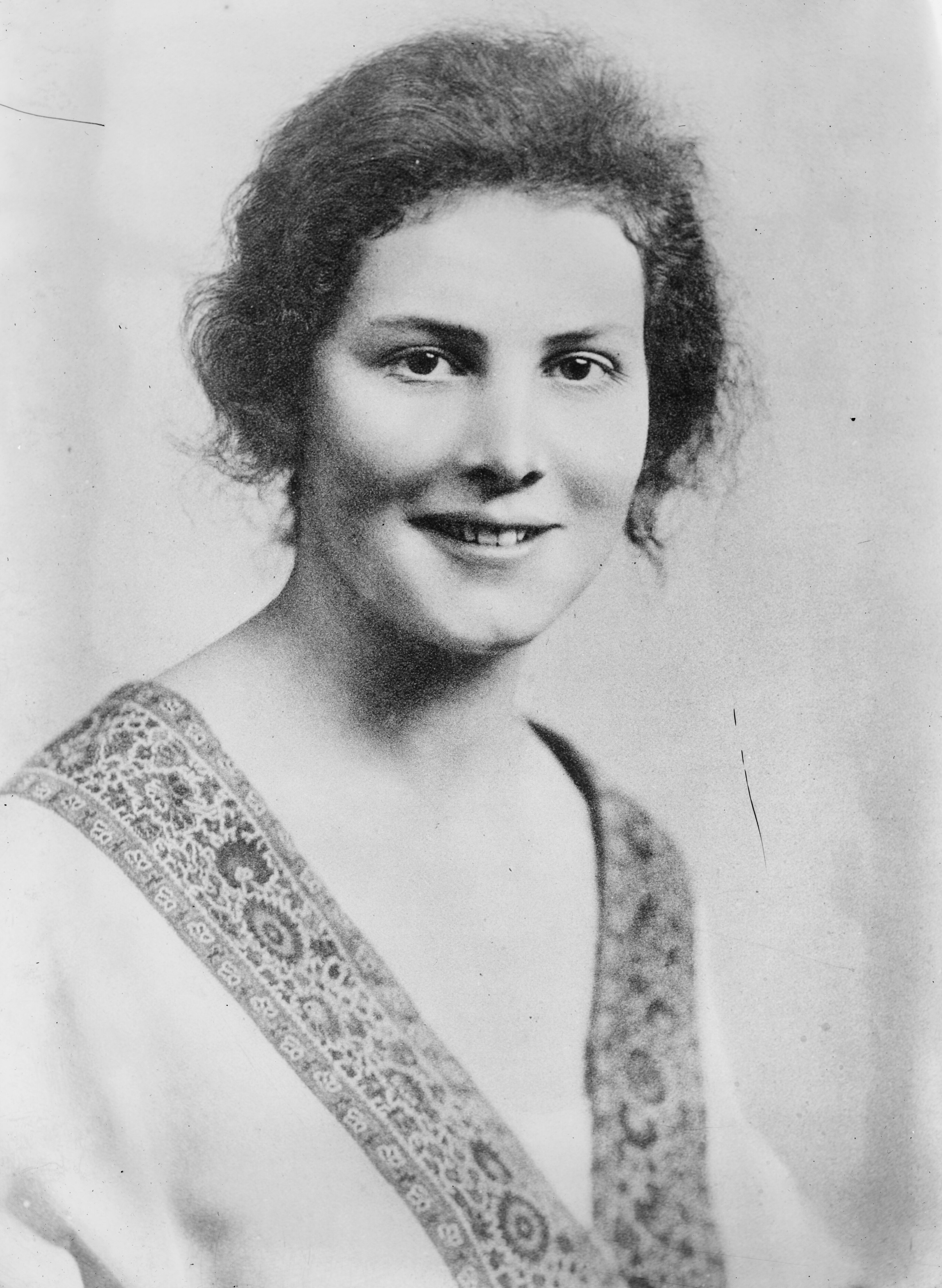
- Born: Ishbel Allan MacDonald; 2 March 1903; Holborn, London, England
- Died: 20 June 1982 (aged 79); Lossiemouth, Scotland
- Resting place: Holy Trinity Church, Spynie, Morayshire, Scotland
- Other name: Ishbel Ridgley
- Education: North London Collegiate School
- Known for: Official Hostess to Ramsay MacDonald
- Political party: Labour
- Spouses: Norman Ridgley (m. 1938; died 1950) James Peterkin (m. 1953; died 1956)
- Parents: Ramsay MacDonald (father); Margaret Gladstone (mother)
- Relatives: Malcolm MacDonald (brother); Sheila Lochhead (sister)

Ishbel Allan Peterkin (née MacDonald; formerly Ridgley; 2 March 1903 – 20 June 1982) was the daughter of Prime Minister of the United Kingdom, Ramsay MacDonald and his wife Margaret MacDonald. Margaret's death in 1911 – a year after their son David had died – left Ramsay a single father to his remaining five children. When, in 1924 he came to power as Prime Minister of the country's first Labour Government, it was Ishbel, as the eldest daughter, who her father decided should be his hostess at 10 Downing Street. At just 20 she became the youngest person ever to take on the role.

== Biography ==
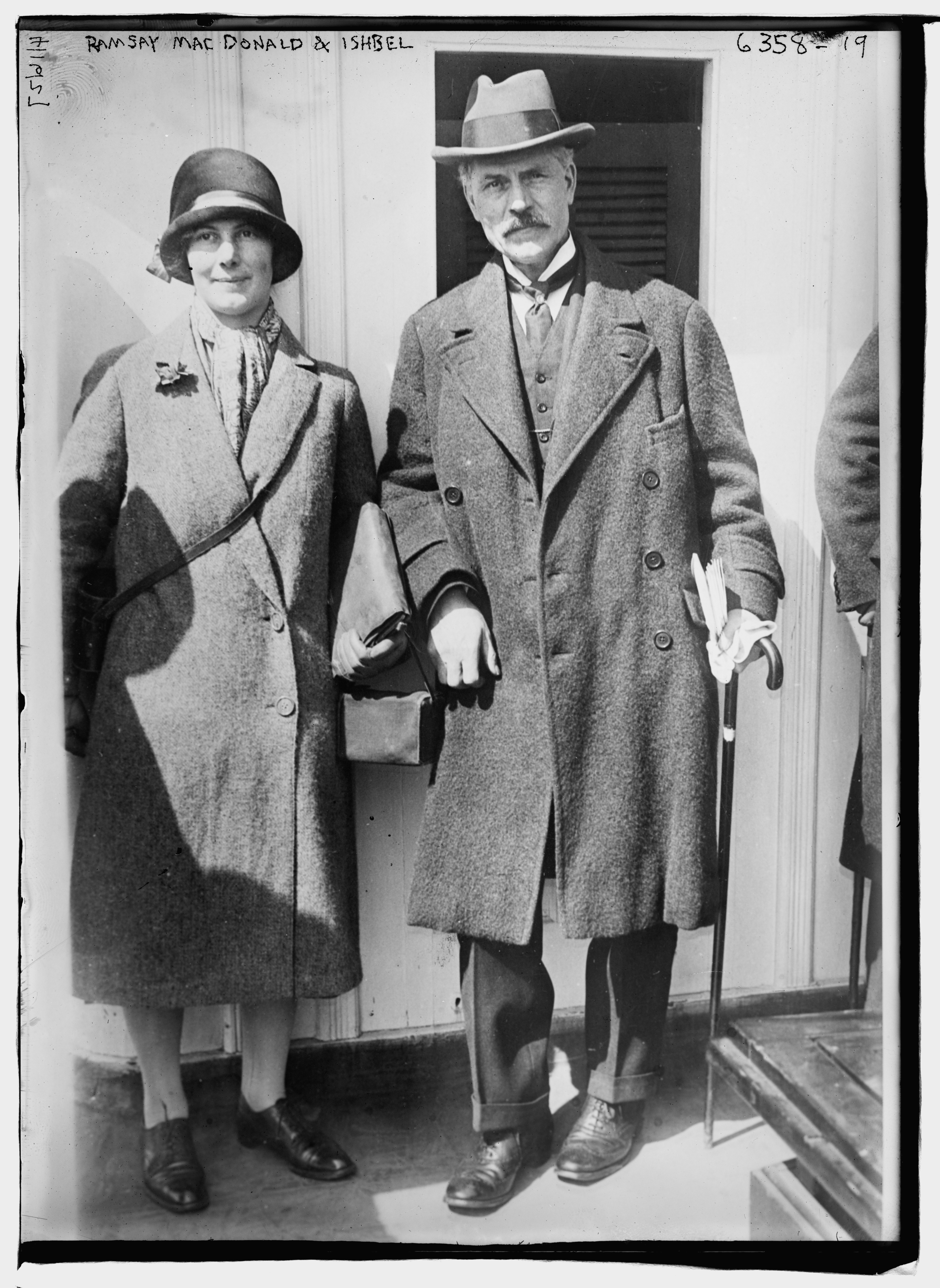
Ishbel MacDonald, the Official Hostess to Ramsay MacDonald

Ishbel Allan MacDonald was born on 2 March 1903. She studied at City of London School for Girls and then at North London Collegiate School, where she was friendly with Peggy Angus. Before her father became Prime Minister, she had been studying social sciences. Due to his meagre earnings and poor background, Ramsay MacDonald knew he would be unable to replicate the Downing Street lifestyle that previous premiers had been wealthy enough to enjoy. His first term of office lasted only ten months, but during that time Ishbel did everything possible to save her father money, cutting back on the cost of heating, food, transport and servants which at the time were expected to be paid out of a Prime Minister's own pocket.

Ishbel imagined that her role would be purely temporary and that when her father's minority government fell she would return to the simple life she had known. In fact she never left her father's side, acting as his official hostess through his three terms of office and his years in opposition until he died in 1937. She became one of the most popular women in Britain, and was constantly in the public eye.

In 1928, she was elected to London County Council as Labour Party member for Poplar. In 1931, she was elected to the London County Council as Labour Party member for Bow and Bromley. Unlike her father, she did not join National Labour, but as she remained hostess at 10 Downing Street, the Labour Group decided in November 1931 that she was ineligible to receive the Labour whip. She then sat as an Independent Socialist on the council.

== Later life and death ==
After her father retired as Prime Minister in 1935, she bought a country pub (The Old Plow, at Speen near High Wycombe, Buckinghamshire) and ran it for 17 years. Ishbel married and was widowed twice. Her first marriage was to Norman Ridgley in 1938. He died in 1950. Her second was to James Peterkin in 1953. He died just three years later. She had no children and from then on chose to live the rest of her life in the family home in Lossiemouth, Scotland, near to where her father had been born. She died there in 1982 aged 79. She is buried at her family under her married name.
