= National Association of Official Prison Visitors =

British charity

National Association of Official Prison Visitors (UK)
- Company type: Charity (registered charity number 1099041)
- Founded: 1924
- Headquarters: United Kingdom
- Website: www.naopv.com

The National Association of Official Prison Visitors (NAOPV) is a British charity which coordinates the work of United Kingdom Official Prison Visitors (OPVs) and provides them with training and support.

The Association was formed in 1924, but traces its origins back to 1901, when prison visiting was first officially recognised. The Association became a registered charity in 2003.

== Structure and functions ==
The Lord Chancellor is ex-officio President, and the Association is run at national level by a small Executive Committee elected by OPVs, and also by a General/Membership Secretary who may be an OPV and a member of the Association.

The executive committee maintains regular liaison with Prison Service staff at national and regional level; contact is also maintained with agencies working with offenders and those having interest in penal affairs. A regular newsletter is sent to all OPVs. The NAOPV is often approached by the media for information on prison visiting matters and has several times been asked to testify to a House of Commons Committee.

=== Branches ===
The NAOPV has a Branch in each prison. The NAOPV sees Branches as strengthening the application and independence of OPVs by giving them group identity. Liaison with prison staff widens experience on both sides. The Branch Chairman and Secretary are points of contact for OPVs, prison staff and other Branches in the region. Branches have joint-strength, and receive support at regional and national level.

== History ==
The first prison visitors in English and Welsh prisons were probably the family and friends of prisoners who came into prison bringing food and clothing, and this continues today with V.O. (Visiting Order) visits. Ministers of religion also made visits, as did officials carrying out inspections, but for many years there were few others. Early visitors included John Wesley who wrote of visits to Newgate Prison in London by Sarah Peters and Silas Todd and others who began visiting in October 1748. Sarah Martin of Yarmouth began prison visiting in 1810 and was mentioned by the prison inspectorate to be still visiting in 1835. Many names of these early visitors were not recorded.

John Howard (prison reformer)'s 1777 book State of the Prisons and his testimonies in Parliament had raised awareness of prison conditions. It was, however, with the advent of Elizabeth Fry's visits to Newgate Prison in 1813 that prison visiting became something of "a cause". To enable co-operation between prison visitors she and others formed the "Ladies Association for the Female Prisoners in Newgate". In 1901 this organisation became a national one, the Lady Visitors' Association.

By 1900 members of this Association" were visiting young male prisoners in addition to females, and in 1922 this was officially recognised at the Boys' Prison at Wandsworth (subsequently transferred to Wormwood Scrubs). Gradually Lady Visitors began to visit adult male prisoners too, although for many years this was without official sanction.

It took far longer for men to become involved in the voluntary visiting of male prisoners in any official way, and it was not until Herbert Gladstone's Committee on Prisons of 1895 that the idea gained any credence. Even then it was to be many years (the 1920s) before adult male prisoners were able to have the benefit of a male visitor on anything like a regular basis. This was because the presence in prison of a male chaplain was thought sufficient. In 1922 an organisation was formed, at first named "Men Visitors Association to Men"; this was soon changed to "The National Association of Prison Visitors" (NAPV). This organisation was at first for men only, but in 1944 the two single sex groups amalgamated and kept the name of the National Association of Prison Visitors.

Sheila Ramsay Lochhead who was chair of the organisation for three years wrote a history of prison visiting in 1993 titled "Outside-in: A Study of Prison Visiting".

In 2003 the Association became a registered charity and changed its name to the present "National Association of Official Prison Visitors" (NAOPV), and at the present time promotes and encourages visiting by several hundred Official Prison Visitors in English and Welsh penal establishments.

== See also ==
- Books to Prisoners
- Conjugal visit
- Prison visitation
