= Margaret MacDonald (social reformer) =

British feminist and social reformer (1870–1911)

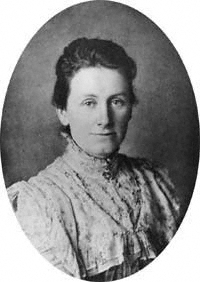
- MacDonald in 1906
- Born: Margaret Ethel Gladstone; 20 July 1870; Kensington, London, England
- Died: 8 September 1911 (aged 41); Lincoln's Inn Fields, London, England
- Resting place: Spynie Cemetery, Morayshire, Scotland
- Occupations: Feminist and social reformer
- Political party: Labour Party
- Spouse: Ramsay MacDonald (m. 1896)
- Children: 6, including Malcolm, Ishbel and Sheila
- Father: John Hall Gladstone (1827–1902)
- Relatives: Isabella Holmes (half-sister)

Margaret Ethel MacDonald (née Gladstone; 20 July 1870 – 8 September 1911) was a British feminist, social reformer, and wife of Labour politician Ramsay MacDonald from 1896 until her death from blood poisoning in 1911.

== Biography ==
Margaret Gladstone was born on 20 July 1870 in Kensington, London, to John Hall Gladstone, later Fullerian Professor of Chemistry at the Royal Institution, and his second wife Margaret (née King), a niece of Lord Kelvin. Her mother died soon after she was born. She was educated both at home and at Doreck College in Bayswater. Early in adulthood she was involved in voluntary social work, including visits for the Charity Organisation Society in Hoxton. Her half sister was Isabella Holmes, who later became a noted social reformer, and an expert on London's burial grounds. By 1890, Margaret was a keen socialist, influenced by the Christian socialists and the Fabian Society.

In 1894, she joined the Women's Industrial Council, serving on several committees and organising the enquiry into home work in London, which was published in 1897. She met Ramsay MacDonald through this work in 1895 and they married in 1896. She was comfortably off, although not wealthy. This allowed them to indulge in foreign travel, visiting Canada and the United States in 1897, South Africa in 1902, Australia and New Zealand in 1906, and India several times.

After her marriage she was concerned about the need for skilled work and training for women and played a key part in establishing the first trade schools for girls in 1904. She continued this work until 1910.

She was a member of the National Union of Women Workers. She served on the executive of the National Union of Women's Suffrage Societies, and she was opposed to militant action. In 1906 she became involved in the formation of the Women's Labour League, serving as chair until her death in 1911.

The marriage to Ramsay MacDonald was a very happy one, and they had six children, including Malcolm MacDonald (1901–1981), who had a prominent career as a politician, colonial governor, and diplomat; Ishbel MacDonald (1903–1982), official hostess to her father and Sheila MacDonald who had political ambitions. After Margaret MacDonald's death on 8 September 1911, Ramsay MacDonald became Prime Minister of the United Kingdom twice but did not remarry. Ishbel and Sheila served as his hostess at functions.

== Monument ==
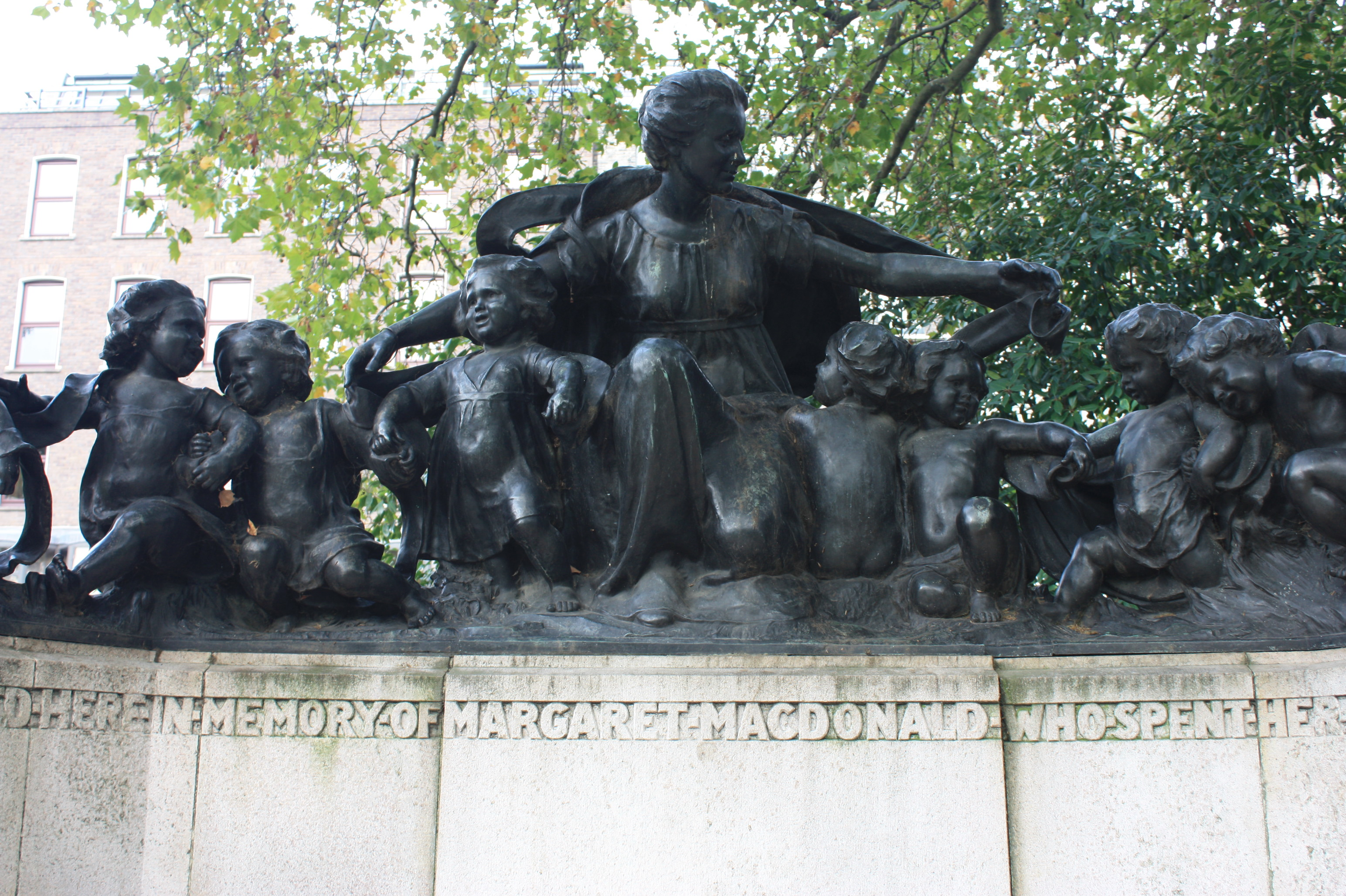
Memorial to Margaret MacDonald by Richard Reginald Goulden, in the garden of Lincoln's Inn Fields, London

The Memorial to Margaret MacDonald was said to be designed by her husband, and sculpted by Richard Reginald Goulden. It was unveiled in 1914 in the garden of Lincoln's Inn Fields, London.
