= Malcolm MacDonald =

British politician and diplomat

The Right Honourable Malcolm MacDonald OM PC
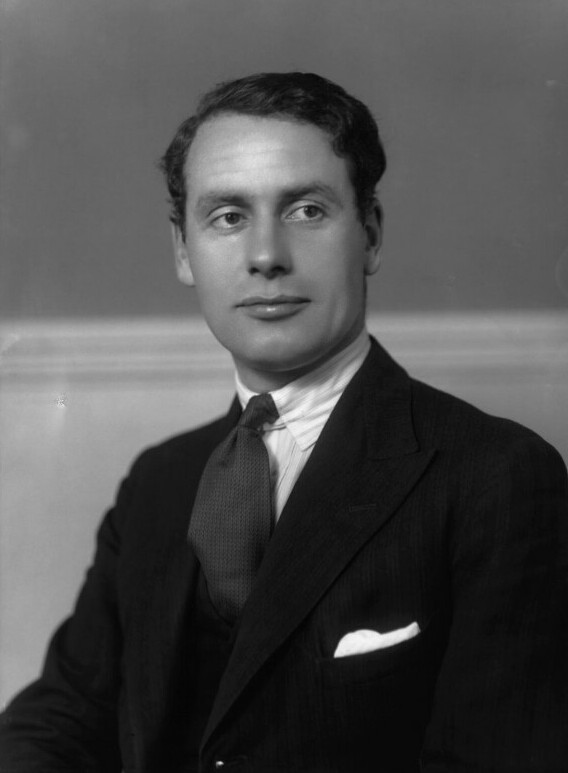
- MacDonald in 1931

Governor-General of Kenya
- In office 12 December 1963 – 12 December 1964
- Monarch: Elizabeth II
- Prime Minister: Jomo Kenyatta
- Preceded by: Himself (as Colonial Governor)
- Succeeded by: Position abolished

Governor of Kenya
- In office 4 January 1963 – 12 December 1963
- Monarch: Elizabeth II
- Preceded by: Sir Eric Griffith-Jones (acting)
- Succeeded by: Himself (as Governor-General)
Diplomatic roles
High Commissioner to India
In office 1955–1960
Monarch	Elizabeth II
Prime Minister	Anthony Eden; Harold Macmillan
Preceded by	Sir Archibald Nye
Succeeded by	Sir Paul Gore-Booth
Commissioner-General for Southeast Asia
In office 1946–1955
Monarchs	George VI; Elizabeth II
Prime Minister	Clement Attlee; Winston Churchill
Preceded by	position established
Succeeded by	Sir Robert Heatlie Scott
High Commissioner to Canada
In office 1941–1946
Monarch	George VI
Prime Minister	Winston Churchill; Clement Attlee
Preceded by	Gerald Campbell
Succeeded by	Alexander Clutterbuck
Ministerial portfolios
Minister of Health
In office 13 May 1940 – 8 February 1941
Prime Minister	Winston Churchill
Preceded by	Walter Elliot
Succeeded by	Ernest Brown
Secretary of State for the Colonies
In office 16 May 1938 – 12 May 1940
Monarch	George VI
Prime Minister	Neville Chamberlain
Preceded by	The Lord Harlech
Succeeded by	The Lord Lloyd
In office 7 June 1935 – 22 November 1935
Monarch	George V
Prime Minister	Stanley Baldwin
Preceded by	Sir Philip Cunliffe-Lister
Succeeded by	James Henry Thomas
Secretary of State for Dominion Affairs
In office 31 October 1938 – 29 January 1939
Monarch	George VI
Prime Minister	Neville Chamberlain
Preceded by	Lord Stanley
Succeeded by	Sir Thomas Inskip
In office 22 November 1935 – 16 May 1938
Monarchs	Edward VIII; George VI
Prime Minister	Stanley Baldwin; Neville Chamberlain
Preceded by	James Henry Thomas
Succeeded by	Lord Stanley
Under-Secretary of State for Dominion Affairs
In office 24 August 1931 – 7 June 1935
Prime Minister	Ramsay MacDonald
Preceded by	William Lunn
Succeeded by	Edward Stanley
Parliamentary offices
Member of Parliament for Ross and Cromarty
In office 10 February 1936 – 15 June 1945
Preceded by	Ian Macpherson
Succeeded by	John MacLeod
Member of Parliament for Bassetlaw
In office 30 May 1929 – 25 October 1935
Preceded by	Ellis Hume-Williams
Succeeded by	Frederick Bellenger

Personal details
- Born: Malcolm John MacDonald; 17 August 1901 Lossiemouth, Scotland
- Died: 11 January 1981 (aged 79) Maidstone, Kent, England
- Resting place: Spynie Cemetery, Morayshire, Scotland
- Party: Labour; National Labour
- Spouse: Audrey Marjorie Fellowes Rowley (m. 1946)
- Children: 3 (2 adopted)
- Parents: Ramsay MacDonald; Margaret Gladstone
- Relatives: Ishbel MacDonald (sister); Sheila Lochhead (sister)
- Education: Queen's College, Oxford

Malcolm John MacDonald (17 August 1901 – 11 January 1981) was a British politician and diplomat. He was initially a Labour Member of Parliament (MP), but in 1931 followed his father Ramsay MacDonald in breaking with the party and joining the National Government. He was consequently expelled from the Labour Party. He was a government minister during the Second World War and was later Governor of Kenya.

MacDonald's experience allowed him to take a unique approach to the decolonisation of British colonies in Asia and Africa. He had "done more for Southeast Asia than perhaps any other living person," according to Harold Macmillan, who also said that "not only Asia, but the whole Western World were indeed grateful to him." Making imperial control obsolete was his life's work, according former Commonwealth Secretary-General Shridath Ramphal. In 1957, he helped Malaya and Singapore get independence as Governor-General and Commissioner-General of Southeast Asia, respectively. In 1963, he helped Kenya achieve independence.

MacDonald served as High Commissioner to Brunei from 1946 to 1948 and as the Commissioner-General in Southeast Asia until 1955, played a significant role in Brunei's modern history. Despite leaving office, he continued to visit Brunei on official business until 1979, meeting with Sultans Ahmad Tajuddin, Omar Ali Saifuddien III, and Hassanal Bolkiah, and developed a deep affection for Malaya and Borneo. (Note: MacDonald said, laughing, "I liked the wild men of Borneo a great deal, no doubt, I am a bit [of a] wild man myself, simply in habits and underdeveloped in my intellectual cap- abilities." He was particularly fond of the indigenous inhabitants of Borneo, such as the Ibans, Kayans, and Kenyahs.) Unlike traditional colonial ambassadors, he approached local authorities with compassion and empathy, often demonstrating more respect than his London superiors preferred. His amiable relationship with Omar Ali reflected his strategy of "gentle persuasion," which, while not always successful in advancing Brunei toward federation, ensured a lasting connection leveraged by the British government, despite sometimes hindering democratic reforms advocated by his colleagues.

== Early life and education ==
Malcolm John MacDonald, the second son of future Prime Minister Ramsay MacDonald and Margaret MacDonald's six children, was born in Lossiemouth on 17 August 1901. Alister, his older sister, was born in 1899, while Ishbel, Davis, and Sheila Lochhead, his three younger siblings, were born in 1903, 1904, and 1910, respectively. He had a peaceful, natural life in Lossiemouth with his family, which served as inspiration for his poetry. He documented his observations of 252 bird species in the Moray Firth and its environs in his first book, Birdwatching in Lossiemouth. Margaret, the mother of Malcolm, was active in the Women's Industrial Council and the National Union of Women Workers, having grown up in a community-focused setting. He was deeply affected by the death of his mother in 1911 when he was ten years old since his parents had taught him the importance of genuine friendship and community duty.

He was educated at Bedales School and The Queen's College, Oxford, where he read economics and history. He was involved in debating competitions and represented the United Kingdom in conferences held in Honolulu in 1927 and Kyoto in 1929 under the auspices of the Institute of Pacific Relations.

== Political career ==
After being elected as a Labour Member of Parliament in the 1929 general election, he backed his father in 1931, just before financial strains caused the Labour Government to collapse. This led to the creation of the National Labour Organisation under Ramsay MacDonald.

At thirty-four, Malcolm MacDonald was appointed Secretary of State for the Colonies in 1935, making him the youngest Cabinet member. As Winston Churchill war cabinet's Minister of Health during World War II, he oversaw the mass evacuation of children from London in order to protect them from German air strikes.

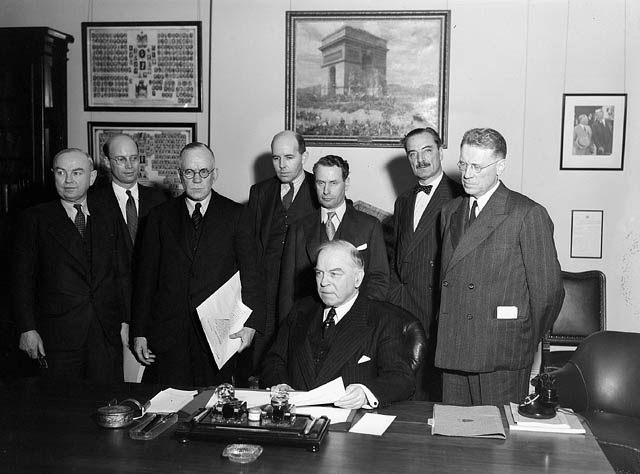
MacDonald seeing the United Kingdom and Canada sign a loan arrangement in 1946

Though there were rumours that MacDonald would be removed from the government when Winston Churchill established a coalition government. MacDonald had succeeded his father as the leader of National Labour when the latter died in 1937. In the end Malcolm MacDonald remained in office, reshuffled to Minister of Health in May 1940. Later, in June 1940, he was dispatched to Dublin to negotiate with Éamon de Valera, proposing to terminate Ireland's Partition in return for Ireland's involvement in the war. However, de Valera turned down the offer and went in search of weaponry, which the British government refused to provide.

From 1941 to 1946, MacDonald held the post of High Commissioner to Canada, which is akin to an ambassador in diplomatic ties between Commonwealth nations. In accordance with the Alexander Carr-Saunders Commission Report, he signed the bill creating the University of Malaya in 1949. From 1949 to 1961, he presided over the institution as its first Chancellor, assisted by George Vance Allen as the first Vice-Chancellor and Onn Jaafar as one of his Pro-Chancellors. He assumed significant duties throughout Asia with his appointment as Governor-General of Malaya, Singapore, (Note: MacDonald was a popular appointment to Singapore, becoming a well-known member of the art and antiques circles and participating in social activities such as the China Society of Singapore. In his honour, the MacDonald House building was constructed in 1949 in Singapore and named after him.) and Borneo following the war. After serving as the High Commissioner in India from 1955 to 1960, (Note: Well-known for his unique charisma, he famously walked on his hands as Indian Prime Minister Jawaharlal Nehru stood on his head, fulfilling a dare that Nehru had issued him just after India gained independence. On many occasions, he performed this act for the King of Siam and cellist Pablo Casals.) he was named chairman of an international conference in Laos. He was instrumental in the founding of the Southeast Asia Treaty Organization in 1955.

MacDonald later concentrated on serving in Africa, holding positions as High Commissioner to Kenya from 1964 to 1965 as well as Governor and Commander-in-Chief of Kenya. Additionally, he participated in a number of diplomatic trips to Nigeria and Rhodesia, among other countries in Africa. He was appointed as the Special Representative to many African Commonwealth nations until his retirement in 1969. Zhou Enlai allegedly hailed him as "the only capitalist we can trust" when on a visit to China.

=== MacDonald White Paper ===
In 1939, MacDonald oversaw and introduced the so-called MacDonald White Paper which aimed at the creation of a unified state in Palestine, with controls on Jewish immigration. The White Paper argued that since over 450,000 Jews had been settled in the Mandate, the terms of the Balfour Declaration had now been met and that an independent Jewish state should not be established. When the White Paper was debated in Parliament on 22–23 May 1939, many politicians objected to its central recommendations. Churchill noted, '"After the period of five years no further Jewish immigration will be permitted unless the Arabs of Palestine are prepared to acquiesce in it". Now, there is the breach; there is the violation of the pledge; there is the abandonment of the Balfour Declaration; there is the end of the vision, of the hope, of the dream.' The outbreak of the Second World War suspended any further deliberations.

Opponents of the White Paper pointed out that Jews were suffering from oppression by the Nazi regimes in Germany and Austria but, given that most states, including the United States and Canada, did not accept Jewish refugees, had nowhere other than Palestine to which to emigrate. In a UK Parliamentary debate, David Lloyd George called the White Paper "an act of perfidy."

In a leader, the Manchester Guardian called it "a death sentence on tens of thousands of Central European Jews", and the Liberal MP James Rothschild stated during the parliamentary debate that "for the majority of the Jews who go to Palestine it is a question of migration or of physical extinction".

=== Diplomacy with Brunei ===
Churchill's war cabinet planned to unify Malaya and the British Borneo territories and resign afterward, with the goal of securing victory for the Allies in 1944. (Note: Cecil Clementi was appointed British Agent for Sarawak and North Borneo, High Commissioner for Brunei and the Malay States, and Governor of the Straits Settlements, which included Labuan.) Part of the reason MacDonald was appointed to a position in Southeast Asia just after the Malayan Union proposal failed was because the Malay community there opposed the sultans' ceding of their authority to the British Crown. He warned his government not to interfere in Brunei's domestic issues, fearing that similar feelings may emerge there.

Despite its modest size, Brunei was considered a valuable asset for federation plans due to its sudden wealth from the 1929 oil discovery, which was seen as essential for developing a balanced economy in a bigger state in North Borneo. MacDonald promoted a loose federation model that suggested a three states, one country solution, although he also favoured maintaining Brunei's sovereignty. He opposed changing the 1905–1906 Supplementary Treaty and recommended the Colonial Office not to associate Brunei with North Borneo or Sarawak as the deadline of 1 July 1946, for the restoration of civilian administration drew near. Rather, he suggested administratively uniting Brunei with a nearby colony without undermining its constitutional standing; as a result, Brunei came under the jurisdiction of the Governor of Sarawak as High Commissioner on 1 May 1948.

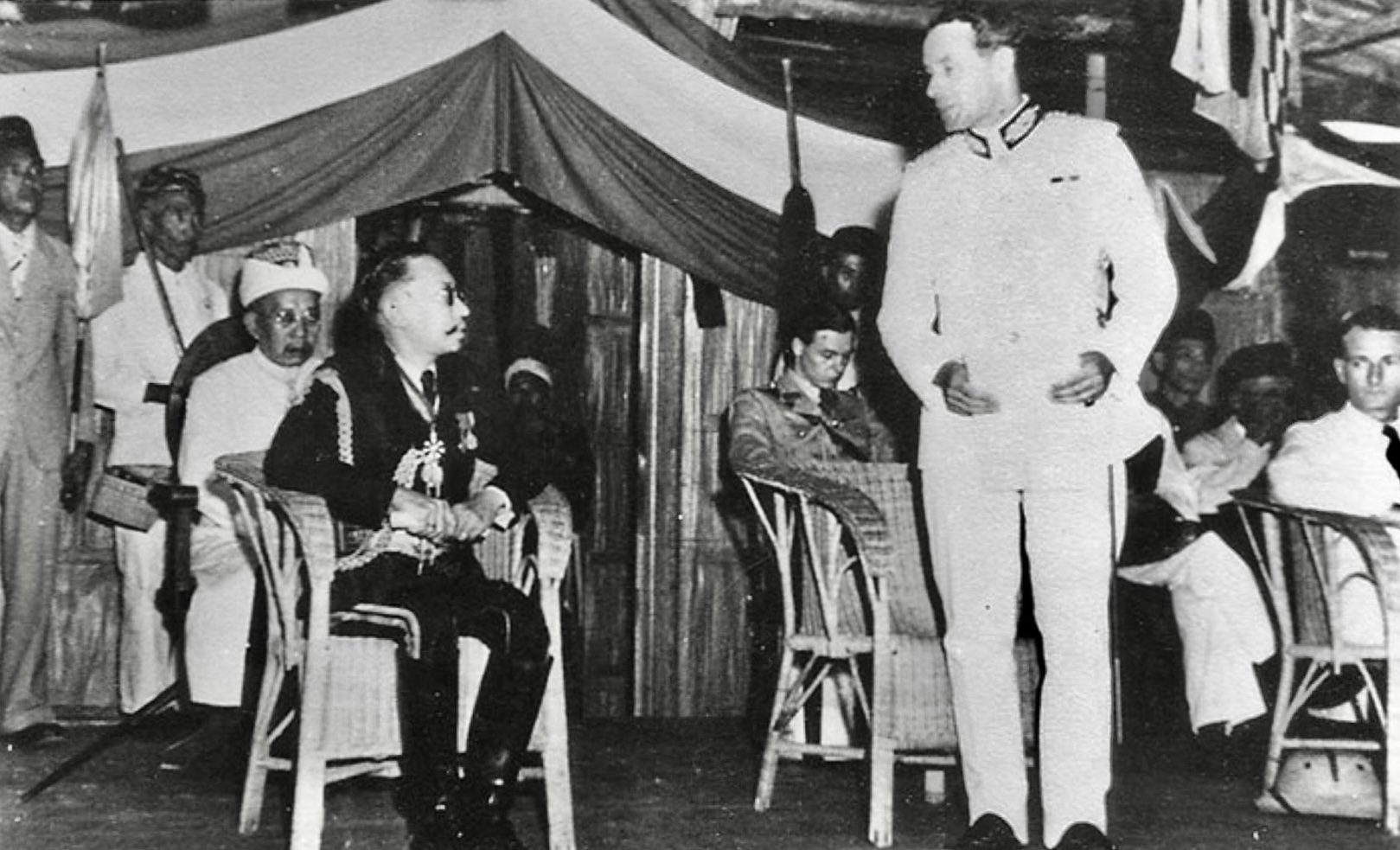
During the silver jubilee celebrations for Ahmad Tajuddin (left) in September 1949, Malcolm (right) sending his greetings

Then-Colonial Secretary MacDonald was aware of Brunei's problems in 1940, such as the Sultan Ahmad Tajuddin's postponed official coronation, which he approved despite reports that British Resident John Graham Black was to blame for the delays. Historian Robert Reece calls MacDonald's writings about the Ahmad Tajuddin, "scurrilous," yet the Sultan was ahead of his time in advocating for more political and financial independence. In his capacities as High Commissioner to Brunei and Governor-General of Malaya, he first visited Brunei on 15 July 1946, and there he experienced nationalist emotions.

MacDonald had to reassure Ahmad Tajuddin during a visit in July 1947 that administrative adjustments would be the only changes brought about by a planned union between Sarawak and Brunei; Brunei would not be merged into the Crown Colony of Sarawak. In September 1949, after the Sultan's unwillingness to attend the festivities owing to delays in the completion of his new palace, he returned to Brunei in his capacity as the British Commissioner-General for Southeast Asia. After being eventually convinced by Abang Haji Mustapha, the Malay chief of Sarawak, the Sultan attended, was knighted by King George VI, and conveyed his thanks and concerns in a way that MacDonald described as both diplomatically savvy and comically cunning.

When Ahmad Tajuddin and MacDonald finally met, he was traveling to England to renegotiate the 1959 Agreement and oil royalties. The meeting took place at MacDonald's home in Singapore. In addition to suggesting that Joseph Conrad's Outcast of the Islands be filmed in Brunei, he also pitched a movie on the Sultan, who was well known for his passion for movies, to film director Carol Reed. But soon after the sudden death of the Sultan in 1950, he had to step in and approve the nomination of Omar Ali Saifuddien III, the younger brother of the deceased Sultan, to succeed him.

The British administration's accession to the Brunei monarchy was mostly uneventful, but for the obstacle Gerard MacBryan presented. He asserted that the late Ahmad Tajuddin had given him permission to represent his interests. MacBryan had been hired as a political consultant on international matters by the Sultan, with responsibility for negotiating Brunei's oil interests with Standard Oil and fighting for the Sultan's rights in the United States. But MacBryan's ambitions to use his relationship with Ahmad Tajuddin to achieve substantial power were dashed, and his attempt to establish himself as Brunei's de facto ruler was quickly abandoned. Despite MacBryan's obviously genuine allegations, MacDonald handled the succession crisis by persuading London that MacBryan was nothing more than a scam. He expressed his admiration for Omar Ali Saifuddien III during the new Sultan's coronation, stating that he believed he was the best option for Brunei and for fostering closer connections with Britain.

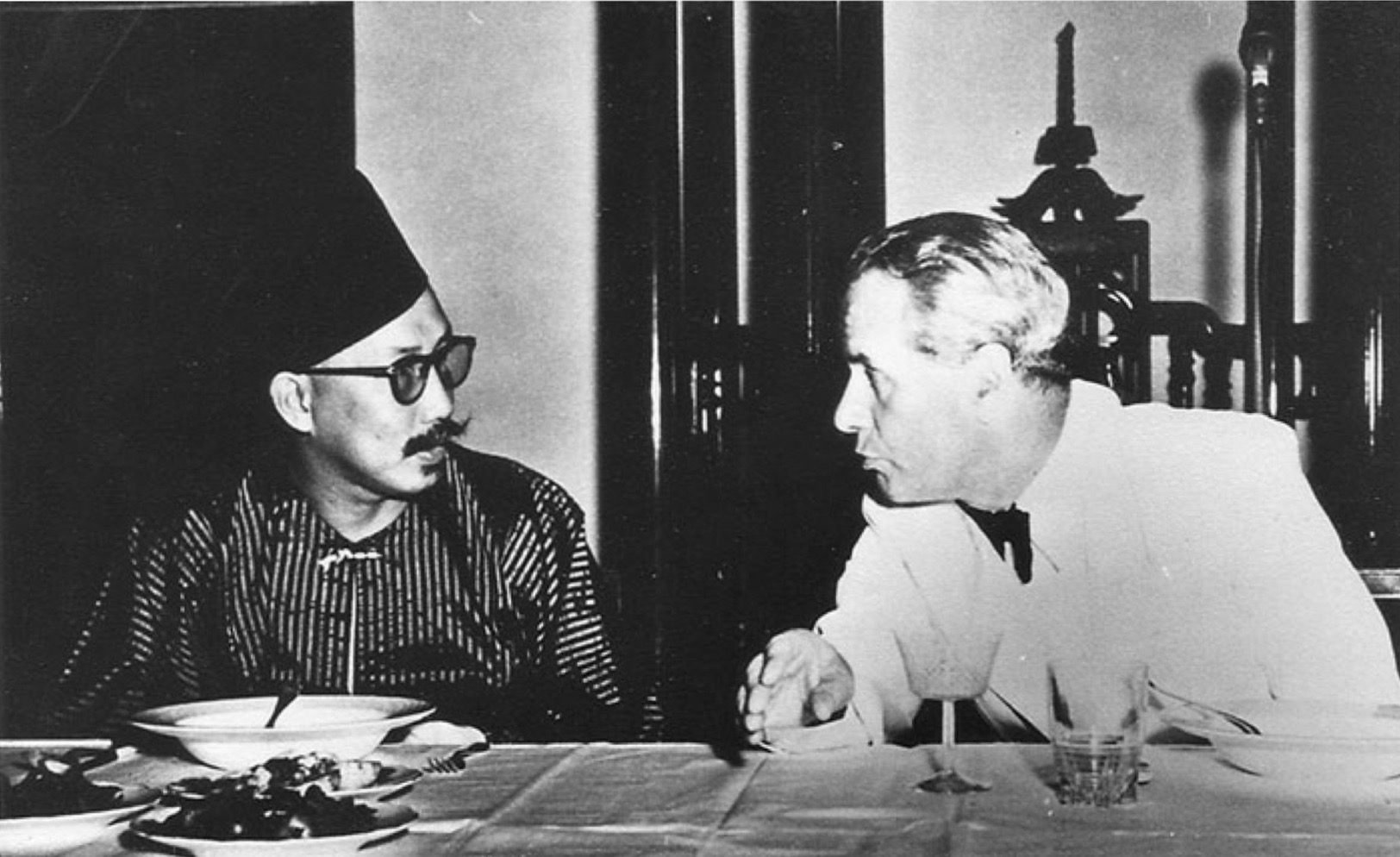
The 1955 discussion between Omar Ali on the left and MacDonald on the right at the Lapau

Given that the new Sultan had worked with the British on plans for Brunei and its neighbours, including the 1948 administrative unification of Sarawak and Brunei, MacDonald's support for him was calculated. Tensions resulted from local discontent with Sarawak's administrative power, even though Omar Ali had initially supported the unification. Historians speculate that Omar Ali eventual resistance to the merger is a reflection of a frequent strategy used by Bruneian Sultans to survive when facing stronger imperial powers.

Records from the British Colonial Office may not always demonstrate MacDonald's sincerity in his devotion to Brunei and Omar Ali, necessitating a closer examination of the parties concerned. An important episode that embarrassed him was when, soon after his rise, Omar Ali openly reaffirmed Brunei's claim to disputed territory. MacDonald intervened to recast the event, saying it was an error and clearing the Sultan of any culpability, in order to lessen the diplomatic impact and save both the Sultan and British interests. The episode brought to light the Sultan's long-standing resentment over Brunei's lost territory, particularly Labuan Island and Limbang. He publicly disagreed with Sarawak's authority and continued to bring up the matter through British diplomatic channels in spite of the passing of time.

In order to further his vision of a federation of the three British provinces in North Borneo, MacDonald had to negotiate his relationship with the newly ascendant Omar Ali. Conflicting interests, especially the Sultan's, caused the federation plan to collapse despite MacDonald's best efforts; it only became reality as the Federation of Malaysia in 1963, excluding Brunei. With the establishment of the Commissioner-General for Southeast Asia in 1948 to supervise communications, defence, and regional development and provide guidance on deeper political integration, British policy sought to promote cooperation among its Southeast Asian holdings, centred around Singapore.

As the initial Commissioner-General, MacDonald vigorously worked toward the establishment of an independent Dominion that included the Federation of Malaya, Singapore, Sarawak, North Borneo, and Brunei. In order to accomplish his goal of a political federation of Borneo territories ultimately integrating with Malaya, he put cooperative departments, frequent conferences, and officer exchanges into practice. Omar Ali dismissed conjectures on a possible federation, highlighting Brunei's independence and sensitivity. The Secretary of State counselled MacDonald to move gradually and refrain from imposing an external federation, letting Brunei become self-governing.

Brunei's unwillingness to join a federation that challenged its sovereignty and would potentially dilute its oil wealth was a major factor in the Federation ideas' failure. Tensions were increased when Brunei refused to share its resources for the development of less developed bordering regions, leading to the Sarawak–Brunei administrative union in 1948. The notion of federation was abandoned in spite of MacDonald's efforts and diplomatic endeavours due to his lack of governmental authority and the shifting political climate in Britain, which included Malaya's independence movement and changes in British policy. After receiving a warm reception in Brunei and attending important royal ceremonies, his vision began to wane as new political realities surfaced.

Omar Ali gave MacDonald a cordial welcome, but turned down his request for money to help North Borneo. This decision was made in light of Brunei's recent $100 million loan to the Malaysian Federation and its unwillingness to support its close neighbours. Disappointed, the Sarawak and North Borneo governors turned their backs on Brunei and concentrated on fortifying their own relationships. When he visited the Omar Ali Saifuddien Mosque in December 1958, he was allowed into the Sultan's private rooms, where they talked about the possibility of Brunei's royal children receiving an education in England. The Raja Isteri Damit's unwillingness to part from the children (Princes Hassanal Bolkiah and Mohamed Bolkiah) caused this arrangement, which had been decided upon beforehand, to be abandoned; they were thereafter enrolled in a Kuala Lumpur school. British authorities saw this change in education as Omar Ali's desire to maintain his ties to Malaya.

British authorities criticised MacDonald for deceiving the Malayan Prime Minister Tunku Abdul Rahman about a possible super federation combining Malaya, Singapore, and the Borneo territories during talks with the Sultan of Brunei and Malayan Prime Minister. Omar Ali became concerned about this and in July 1963 rejected the idea for Malaysian Federation, therefore proving his independence and upsetting the objectives of its main proponents. Despite his support for Malaysia, MacDonald was wary of pressuring Brunei, Sarawak, or North Borneo to join, and cautioned the British against putting more pressure on Brunei following Omar Ali's denial.

Following his retirement from government employment in July 1969, Harold Wilson's administration named MacDonald as a traveling envoy, allowing him to carry on serving Britain's interests by resolving diplomatic disputes between the United Kingdom and Brunei. Omar Ali, a close friend of his, stepped down from the throne in 1967 but continued to have influence. 1967 constitutional negotiations in London were tense because of a disagreement between the Sultan and Secretary of State Herbert Bowden, who had little regard for the monarch. MacDonald criticised Bowden for his contemptuous behaviour toward the retired Sultan.

Early in 1968, when the new British High Commissioner-designate Arthur Adair was rejected by Omar Ali and the Sultan Hassanal Bolkiah, MacDonald was asked to mediate a diplomatic deadlock between Brunei and Britain. The discussions between the United Kingdom and Brunei had come to a standstill for over half a year. After visiting the Brunei palace and learning about Omar Ali's complaints, he admitted that the ex-Sultan had not received proper treatment on his last trip to London. He also concurred that by moving the previous High Commissioner without first informing the Sultan, Britain could have violated the terms of the 1959 Agreement. By means of delicate diplomatic manoeuvres, MacDonald managed to win back the trust of the former Sultan and facilitate the restoration of regular ties between the two countries.

MacDonald was instrumental in handling the sensitive issue in reaction to Britain's decision to remove its soldiers from Brunei by December 1970. He recommended against hastening the notification of troop departure because he was aware of the prospective consequences, which included Brunei's potential economic reprisal and the termination of British diplomatic ties. Because of his effective negotiating, the negotiations were postponed and Frank Webber was temporarily reinstated, facilitating a more seamless introduction of Adair to the Sultan. In contrast to people like Anthony Abell, who aimed to modernise Brunei's political system, MacDonald concentrated on preserving stability and appeasing the authoritarian inclinations of Omar Ali. This was in contrast to other British officials who were working for democratic reforms in Brunei.

During significant political changes, MacDonald played a crucial role in upholding Brunei's independence and the Sultan's right to reign. In contrast to Brunei's democratic reformers such as Abell, he supported Omar Ali's opposition to reform, upholding the Sultan's power and opposing ideas such as the Federation of North Borneo and Malaysia. MacDonald, honouring the Sultan's desires, successfully postponed Britain's troop pullout until 1971 in order to prevent instability in the area, even though Britain had intended to remove its troops and abolish Brunei's protectorate status by 1970. His efforts eventually resulted in a change of leadership in Britain, which paved the way for a revised 1971 deal that gave Brunei complete internal self-government along with continuous British defence backing.

Despite difficulties brought on by Omar Ali's intransigence and Malaysia's covert assistance for Brunei's former rebels, MacDonald remained an important figure in Brunei's affairs under Sultan Hassanal Bolkiah. He revived his prior proposal in 1968 and 1974 for a federation of the three northern Borneo states, headed nominally by the Sultan of Brunei. This concept was in stark contrast to Bruneian and British authorities' antiquated and impossible ideal of a unified "Kalimantan Utara", which it mimicked. In the end, the idea was rejected as impractical since the Sultan was against being a member of such a federation.

MacDonald persisted in supporting the notion of a looser federation between Brunei and Malaysia despite Brunei's choice to avoid Malaysia, acknowledging the potential for eventual economic and cultural similarities to bring the two countries together. Although he thought Brunei would eventually have to join Malaysia, he was against Malaysia having any kind of power over the Sultanate. He cautioned Brunei against being forced to consider a merger and urged against it. His participation at Raja Isteri Damit's burial on his last visit to Brunei in 1979 demonstrated the close personal relationships he had formed over the years. He never had the chance to meet Omar Ali and Hassanal Bolkiah in person, but he kept in regular connection with both of them.

=== Malayan Emergency and headhunting scandal ===
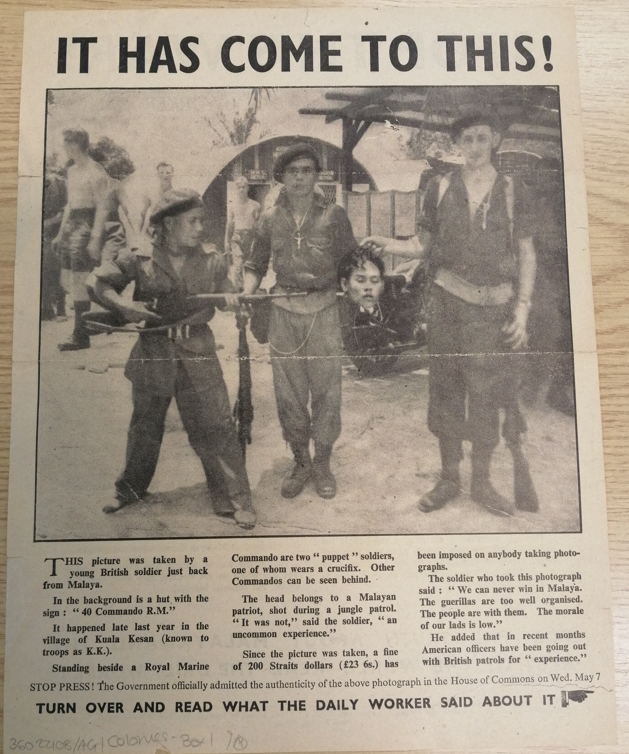
The Daily Worker released an anti-colonial pamphlet in 1952 amid the British-Malayan headhunting scandal.

During the late 1940s and early 1950s, MacDonald suggested combining Sabah, Sarawak, Singapore, Brunei, and Malaya into a single region known as "Malaya Raya." He tried to push for this larger federation and had talks with influential people like Onn Jaafar, but the Borneo territories did not embrace the idea, therefore it did not take off. Right up to his relocation to India in 1955, MacDonald kept up his advocacy for the notion of Malaysia. Lord Brassey had proposed in 1887 to unite Malaya, Singapore, and Borneo; he brought this notion back to life. The Borneo provinces' lack of support prevented the initiative from gaining pace, despite his best efforts.

In 1952, the Daily Worker published photographs of atrocities committed by Iban mercenaries in the Malayan Emergency, including headhunting and scalping. MacDonald, who had facilitated the deployment of these mercenaries and had previously praised them, became embroiled in the resulting British Malayan headhunting scandal, which featured a controversial photo of him welcoming Iban headhunters. During the Malayan Emergency, he had toured Malaya with American politicians, during which he showcased Ibans to the Americans. Living in Iban settlements, he had many interactions with Ibans and once called an experienced Iban headhunter "one of the greatest men I had ever met". J. R. Campbell had previously been involved in the political careers of the MacDonald family as he had inadvertently contributed the collapse of the Labour government following the 1924 Campbell Case.

== Later life and death ==
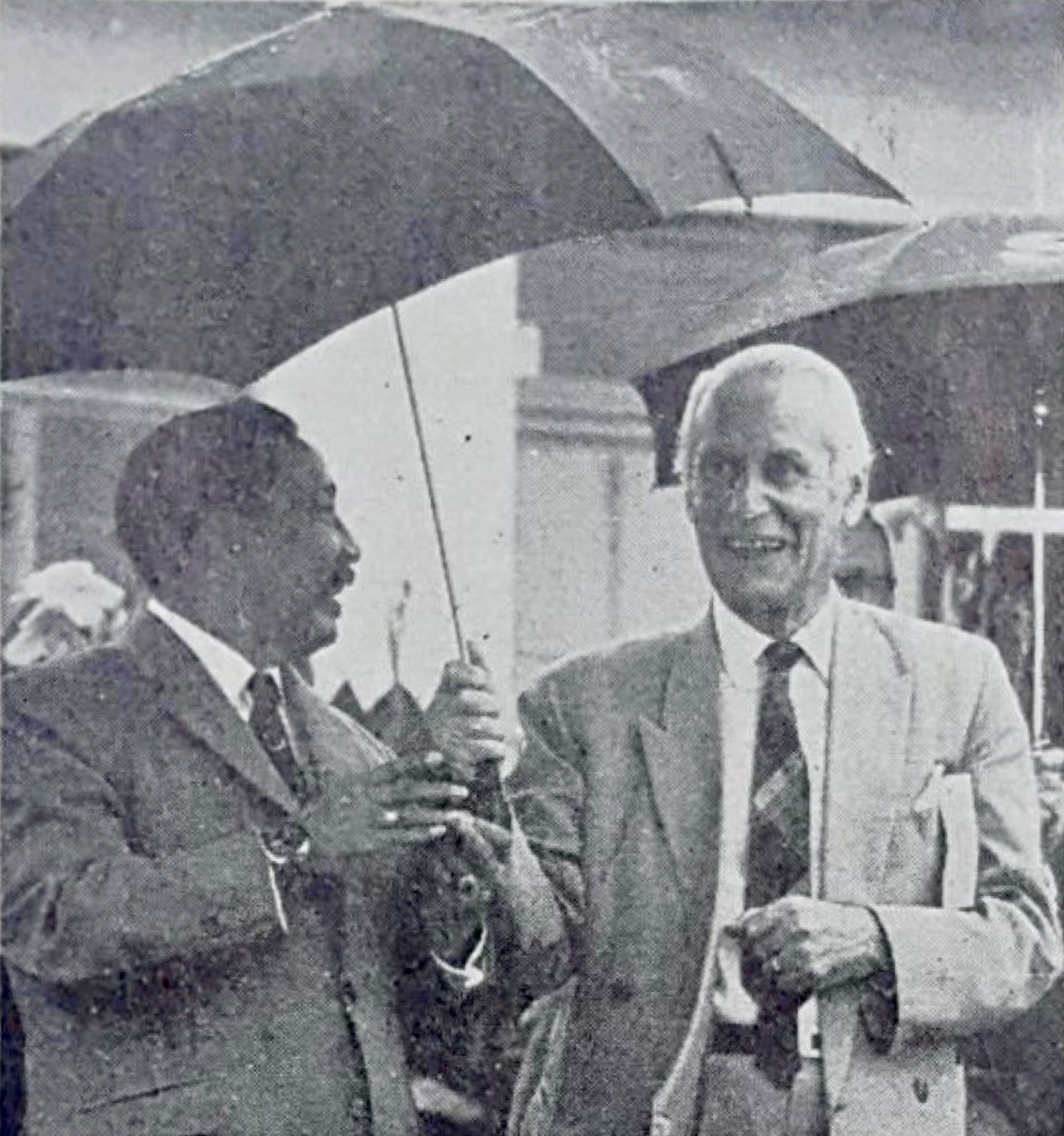
The retired Omar Ali (left) and MacDonald (right) in 1971

After retiring, MacDonald became the President of Overseas Voluntary Service and the Chancellor of Durham University from 1971 to 1980.

MacDonald died on 11 January 1981, at the age of 79. According to his family's account to the British Press Association, he died in the grounds of his house close to Sevenoaks, Kent. Medical report is awaited to determine the cause of death. At the time of his death, his wife was on vacation in Canada. His personal collection of significant historical records on the nations he visited, notably Malaysia, is currently held at the National Museum of Singapore, Durham University Library, Asian Art Museum, and University of Malaya.

On 9 May 2015, his widow Audrey died of natural causes in Ottawa at the age of 99 years old, three weeks before her 100th birthday.

== Personal life ==
MacDonald was a keen ornithologist and, in 1934, published the book Bird Watching at Lossiemouth privately. It was, as he noted, in a brief foreword, an expanded version of a paper he read to the London Morayshire Club one evening in the autumn of 1933.

While High Commissioner of the United Kingdom to Canada, MacDonald undertook two extensive journeys, in a Grumman Goose, from Ottawa to the far northwest of Canada. He was accompanied by three senior Government officials, in August 1942 and March 1943. He chronicled the trips in a book, Down North (Oxford University Press, Toronto, 1943). The trips covered remote areas of Alberta, the Northwest Territories, the Yukon and British Columbia, going as far north as Aklavik. MacDonald's book gives a perspective of the history, geography and peoples of Canada's northwest.

MacDonald was a prolific art collector in a range of genres, most notably Chinese ceramics. He sold and donated art collections to museums across the world. His Chinese ceramic collections comprise a total of over 500 pieces with a chronological span of 2000 BCE to circa 1940 CE and incorporating representative examples of most styles of domestic and export ceramic wares. These collections are today split between the Durham University Oriental Museum, the Museum of Asian Art, Kuala Lumpur and the NUS Museum in Singapore.

MacDonald married Audrey Marjorie Rowley in December 1946, and they had a daughter, Fiona. Bill and Jane Rowley are the two adoptive children Malcolm MacDonald had from his first marriage.

== Other works ==
The painstakingly gathered records of MacDonald's travels and career were originally kept in storage at the Royal Commonwealth Society. His family made the decision to give the collection to the University of Durham so that it may be preserved and used for study after his death. His sister Sheila Lochhead, Durham University librarian A. M. McAulay, and Royal Commonwealth Society librarian D. H. Simpson contributed the collection, which is arranged chronologically and divided into official tasks, correspondence, and personal documents.

The University of Durham's MacDonald collection is among the Islamic and Malay World manuscripts that Universiti Sultan Zainal Abidin (UniSZA) was entrusted by the Ministry of Education in 2019 to digitise. In keeping with the advances of the digital age, thirty thousand sheets of his records were digitised and uploaded to the UniSZA e-Manuscript System. Under the direction of the Research Institute for Products and Islamic Civilisation (INSPIRE), the initiative aims to preserve and study his personal notes, official papers, photos, and letters pertaining to important historical events in Malaya.

He was an avid birdwatcher and wrote books about his observations on birds.

He authored the following published works:

- MacDonald, Malcolm (1943). Down North. London: Oxford University Press.
- MacDonald, Malcolm (1947). The Birds of Brewery Creek. London: Oxford University Press.
- MacDonald, Malcolm (1956). Borneo People. London: Jonathan Cape.
- Macdonald, Malcolm (1959). Angkor. London: Jonathan Cape.
- MacDonald, Malcolm (1960). Birds in My Indian Garden. London: Jonathan Cape.
- MacDonald, Malcolm (1962). Birds In The Sun. London: Jonathan Cape.
- MacDonald, Malcolm (1965). Treasure of Kenya. London: Collins.
- MacDonald, Malcolm (1969). People and Places. London: HarperCollins. ISBN 978-0002116732.
- MacDonald, Malcolm (1972). Titans & Others. London: Collins. ISBN 978-0002118354.
- MacDonald, Malcolm (1980). Inside China. London: Heinemann. ISBN 978-0434440405.
- MacDonald, Malcolm (2018). Shaw, Alexander Nicholas (ed.). The Pleasures and Pains of Collecting (Hardback). Durham: Durham University Museum. ISBN 9781527231986.
- Constant Surprise (unpublished autobiography – held at Durham University Library Archives)

== Honours ==
MacDonald rejected titles and medals despite his lengthy service to Labour and Conservative governments until receiving the Order of Merit in 1969. The Order is limited to 24 individuals, most of whom are in the arts and sciences. It is known that he received many honours, including:

- Order of Merit (OM)
- Honorary Fellow at Queen's College, Oxford
- Honorary Doctor of Law and Honorary Doctor of Letters (Durham) Freeman, City of Singapore
- Honorary Doctorate from Heriot-Watt University (1973)
- Freeman, Burgh of Lossiemouth

== Notes ==
Parliament of the United Kingdom
Preceded by Sir Ellis Hume-Williams, 1st Baronet	Member of Parliament for Bassetlaw; 1929–1935	Succeeded by Frederick Bellenger
Preceded by Ian Macpherson	Member of Parliament for Ross and Cromarty; 1936–1945	Succeeded by John MacLeod
Political offices
Preceded by Sir Philip Cunliffe-Lister	Secretary of State for the Colonies; 1935	Succeeded by James Henry Thomas
Preceded by James Henry Thomas	Secretary of State for Dominion Affairs; 1935–1938	Succeeded by Lord Stanley
Preceded by The Lord Harlech	Secretary of State for the Colonies; 1938–1940	Succeeded by The Lord Lloyd
Preceded by Lord Stanley	Secretary of State for Dominion Affairs; 1938–1939	Succeeded by Sir Thomas Inskip
Preceded by Walter Elliot	Minister of Health; 1940–1941	Succeeded by Ernest Brown
Preceded by Sir Patrick Muir Renison	Governor of Kenya; 1963	Independence
New title	Governor-General of Kenya; 1963–1964	Republic declared
Diplomatic posts
Preceded by Gerald Campbell	High Commissioner to Canada; 1941–1946	Succeeded by Alexander Clutterbuck
Preceded by Sir Archibald Nye	High Commissioner to India; 1955–1960	Succeeded by Sir Paul Gore-Booth
Academic offices
New title	Chancellor of the University of Malaya; 1949–1961	Succeeded by Tunku Abdul Rahman
Preceded by The Earl of Scarbrough	Chancellor of the University of Durham; 1971–1980	Succeeded by Dame Margot Fonteyn
Honorary titles
Preceded by Sir Henry Slesser	Senior Privy Counsellor; 1979–1981	Succeeded by The Duke of Beaufort
