= Prison visitor =

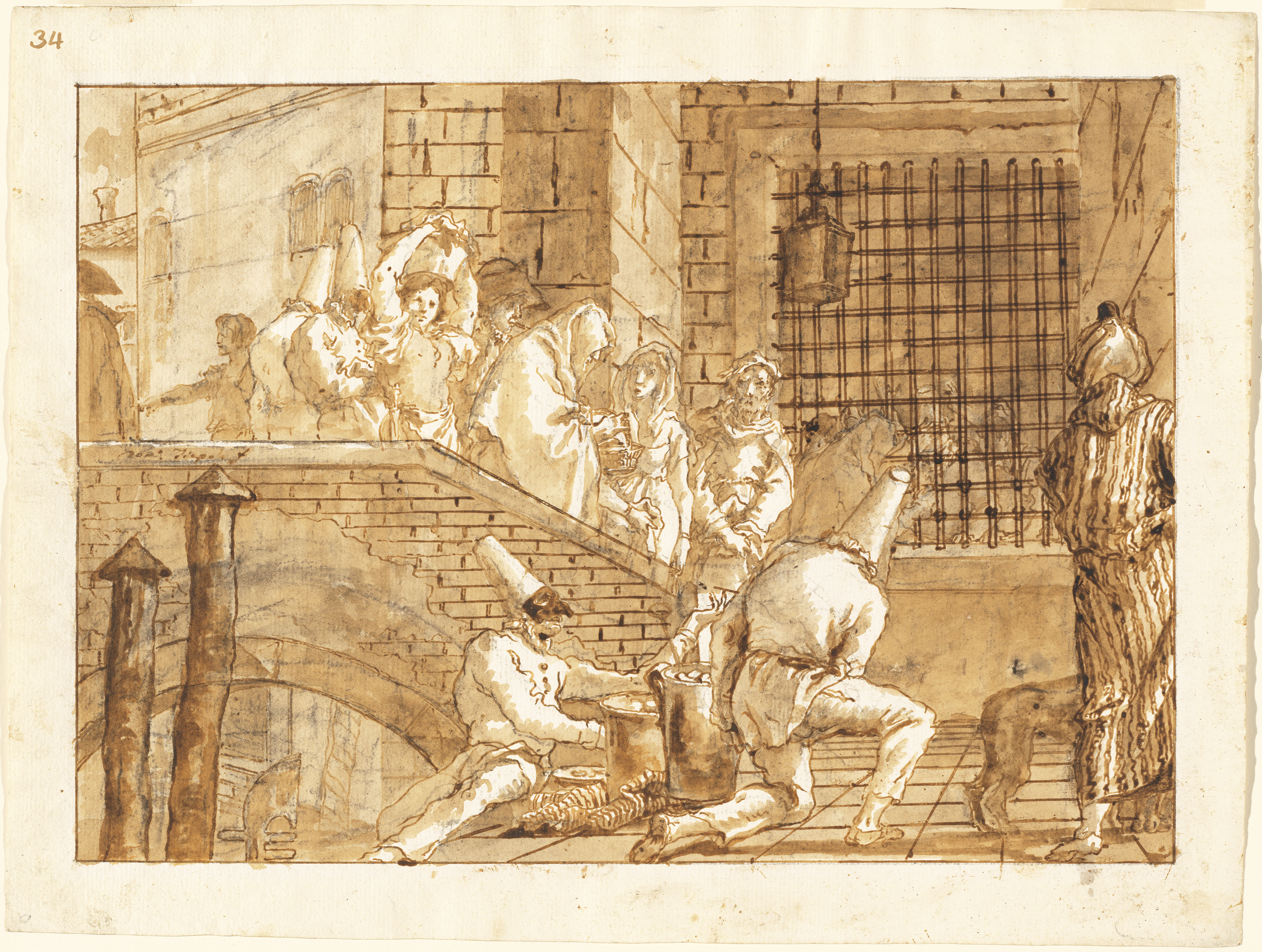
Giovanni Domenico Tiepolo, The Prison Visit, 1797-1804.

A prison visitor is a person who visits prisons to befriend and monitor the welfare of prisoners in general, as distinct from a person who visits a specific prisoner to whom they have a prior connection. Prisons may also have a visiting committee.

== Organizations ==
There are voluntary organisations of prison visitors in many jurisdictions, some of which have official recognition. Examples include:

- National Association of Official Prison Visitors in the United Kingdom
- Prisoners' Friends' Association in Hong Kong
- Prisoner Visitation and Support in the United States
- Norwegian Red Cross in Norway
