= Crompton War Memorial =

War memorial in Greater Manchester, England

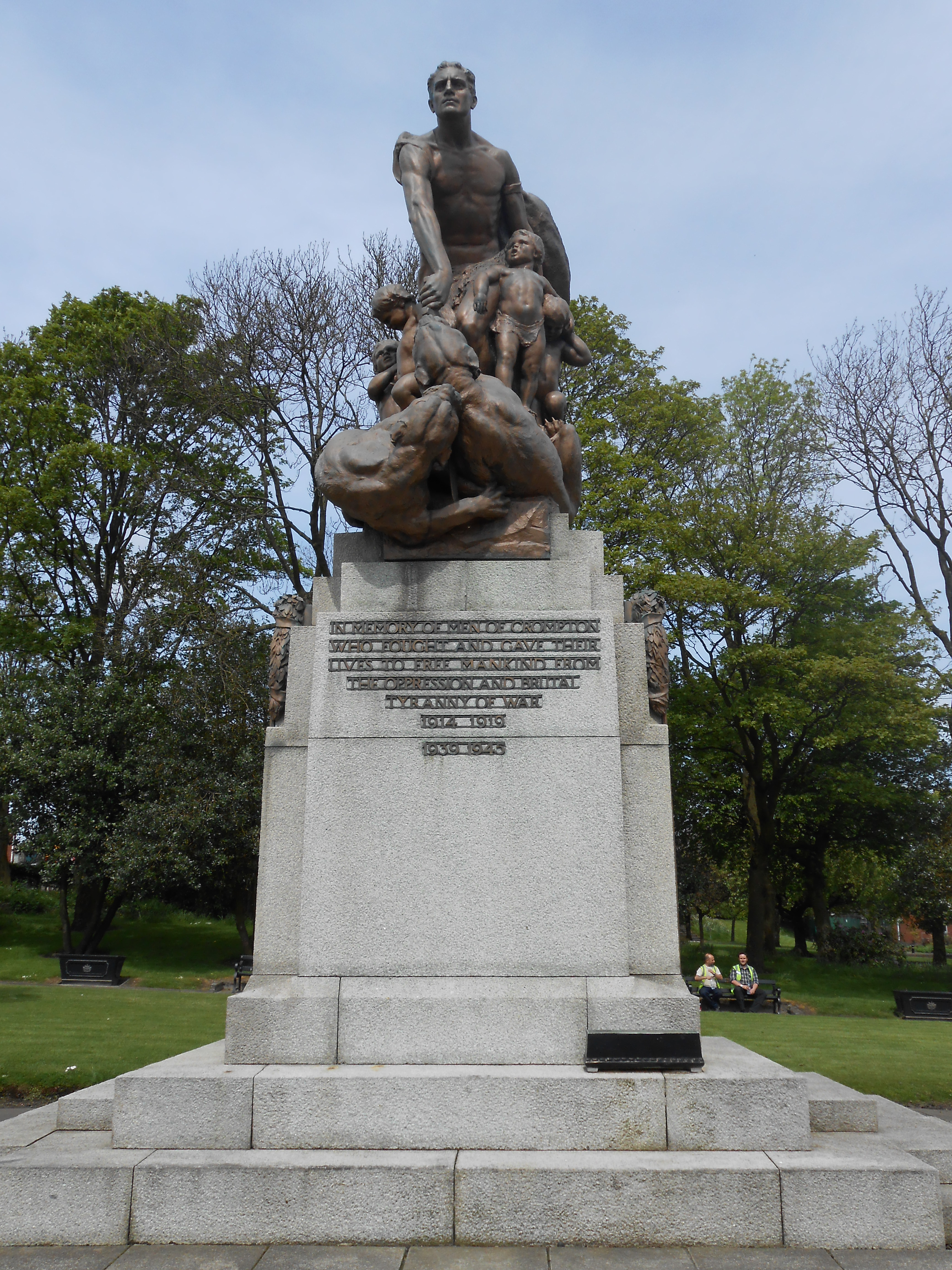
- The war memorial in 2014

- Location within Greater Manchester

General information
- Location: High Street, Shaw and Crompton, Greater Manchester, England
- Coordinates: 53.5752°N 2.0960°W
- Year built: 1923; 103 years ago

Technical details
- Material: Aberdeen granite

Design and construction
- Architect: Richard Reginald Goulden

Listed Building – Grade II*
- Official name: Crompton War Memorial
- Designated: 6 October 1987
- Reference no.: 1068100

Crompton War Memorial is a Grade II* listed monument in the Memorial Gardens on High Street in Shaw and Crompton, a civil parish within the Metropolitan Borough of Oldham, Greater Manchester, England. It was unveiled on 29 April 1923 by General Sir Ian Hamilton to commemorate those who had fallen in the First World War, and was later updated to include those who died during the Second World War.

== History ==
By 1919, a local committee had been established to decide on the design of a monument commemorating the men of Crompton who had fallen in the First World War. The committee dismissed proposals based on realism, considering that such depictions did not evoke a strong emotional response from the public. Instead, they favoured symbolic or allegorical approaches, seeking a memorial that would reflect what they described as the "splendid effort and self-sacrifice of the men of Crompton," who had given their lives "to prevent the will of a great and aggressive nation being brutally forced upon us" and to secure "the march forward, in brotherly love, of the future generations".

The committee appointed Richard Reginald Goulden, a sculptor recognised for his allegorical war memorials. Goulden had served as a captain with the Royal Engineers during the First World War, and in the post‑war years he undertook a series of notable commissions, including memorials for the Bank of England (1921), and Brightlingsea (1921). Allegorical figures representing the safeguarding of children, used as emblems of the future, feature prominently in his memorial designs, including those at the Church of St Michael, Cornhill in London, and in Kingston upon Thames. Drawing on his training in both architecture and engineering, Goulden was able to design the sculptures together with their pedestals, and also to undertake the surveying and preparation of sites for installation.

For the Crompton memorial, Goulden advanced his recurring motif of "manhood defending," previously seen at St Michael's and at Shaw's Corner in Redhill. At its centre stands a nude warrior, leaning forward as he drives his sword into the mouth of one of two attacking beasts, while small children huddle for safety beside him.

Public contributions of £4,000 funded the memorial, with an additional £2,067 spent on landscaping. The bronze elements were cast by A. B. Burton's foundry in Thames Ditton, Surrey. The monument contains a lead time capsule filled with locally produced items, such as a newspaper and textiles, as well as reports prepared by the local Disabled Sailors and Soldiers Association, the Urban District Council, and a record of the memorial's creation.

On 29 April 1923, the memorial was unveiled by General Sir Ian Hamilton, the day after he had performed the same ceremony at Oldham War Memorial, and was dedicated by the vicar of Shaw, the Reverend A. R. Mackintosh. A substantial gathering witnessed the ceremony, during which wreaths were placed by Mr Ormerod, acting on behalf of disabled servicemen, and by Mrs Hopley in her role as council chair and mother of eight sons who had served, three of whom are named on the memorial.

In 1926 Goulden designed a fountain for Crompton in memory of local women; it was later stolen in 1968.

On 12 November 1950, an unveiling took place of an added panel dedicated to the memory of those who lost their lives in the Second World War.

On 6 October 1987, Crompton War Memorial was designated a Grade II* listed building for its architectural and historic significance.

The memorial remains a central site for community remembrance. Annual services are held on Remembrance Sunday, reinforcing its role as a monument to sacrifice and collective memory.

== Location ==
Set within public gardens, the memorial occupies a site on the northern side of High Street in Shaw and Crompton.

== Design and architecture ==
The memorial comprises a bronze sculptural group set upon a four‑stepped pedestal and a two‑stepped plinth, both constructed from Aberdeen granite. Additional half‑steps to either side provide convenient access to the bronze name plaques in relief.

The bronze sculpture portrays a muscular male warrior leaning forward as he drives a sword into the mouth of one of two powerful beasts at his feet. The figure is semi‑nude, wearing a loincloth and a cape fastened at the shoulders and flowing behind. The beasts, canine in appearance, are rendered with exaggerated musculature, clawed feet, and prominent sabre‑like teeth. The warrior shields six small children, also clothed in loincloths, arranged around him in varied poses: two to his right, three to his left, and one behind. His left hand clasps that of a child at his side. Within the composition, the children are presented as emblems of purity and of generations yet to come, while the beasts have been read as embodying threats such as hostile forces, malign influences, or the perils of existence. The artist's signature, "R R GOULDEN SCULP", appears on the base's left side beside the warrior's right foot.

On the south-facing front of the pedestal, a dedication is presented in raised bronze letters, reading:

IN MEMORY OF MEN OF CROMPTON
WHO FOUGHT AND GAVE THEIR
LIVES TO FREE MANKIND FROM
THE OPPRESSION AND BRUTAL
TYRANNY OF WAR
1914 1919
1939 1945

Flanking each side of the pedestal are elongated bronze panels, their surfaces bearing in relief the names of 346 individuals who died. At the top of these panels, wreath motifs frame inset profile reliefs: on the east, a soldier paired with an airman; on the west, a sailor alongside a soldier, beneath the inscription "PRO PATRIA" ("for the fatherland" or "for one's country").

The reverse side of the monument carries a bronze panel listing the names of 76 men who lost their lives in the Second World War. The text of the inscription states:

TO THE HONOUR AND GLORY OF THE MEN WHO LOST
THEIR LIVES 1939 – 1945
(NAMES)

== Gallery ==
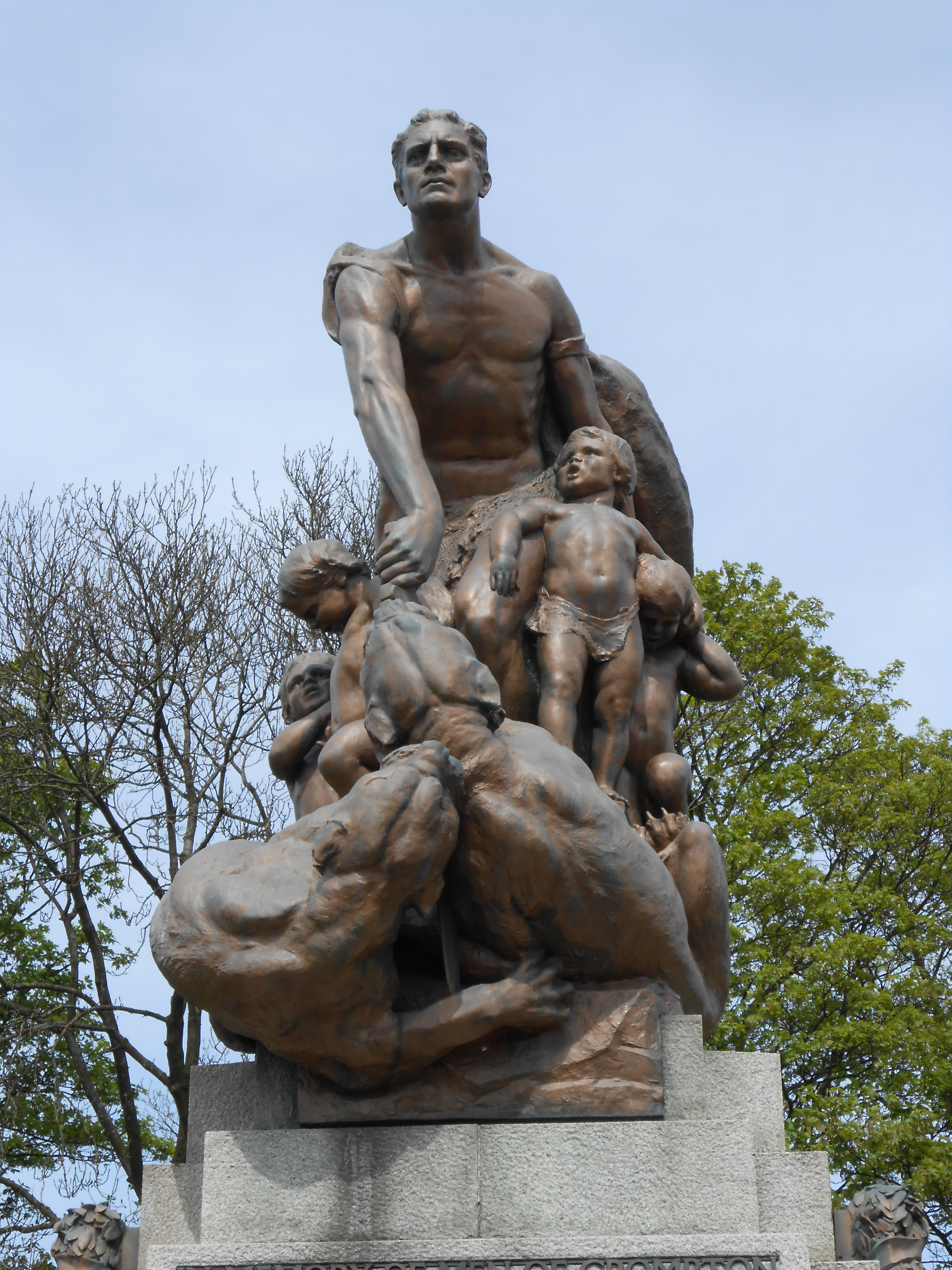
Bronze group atop the memorial

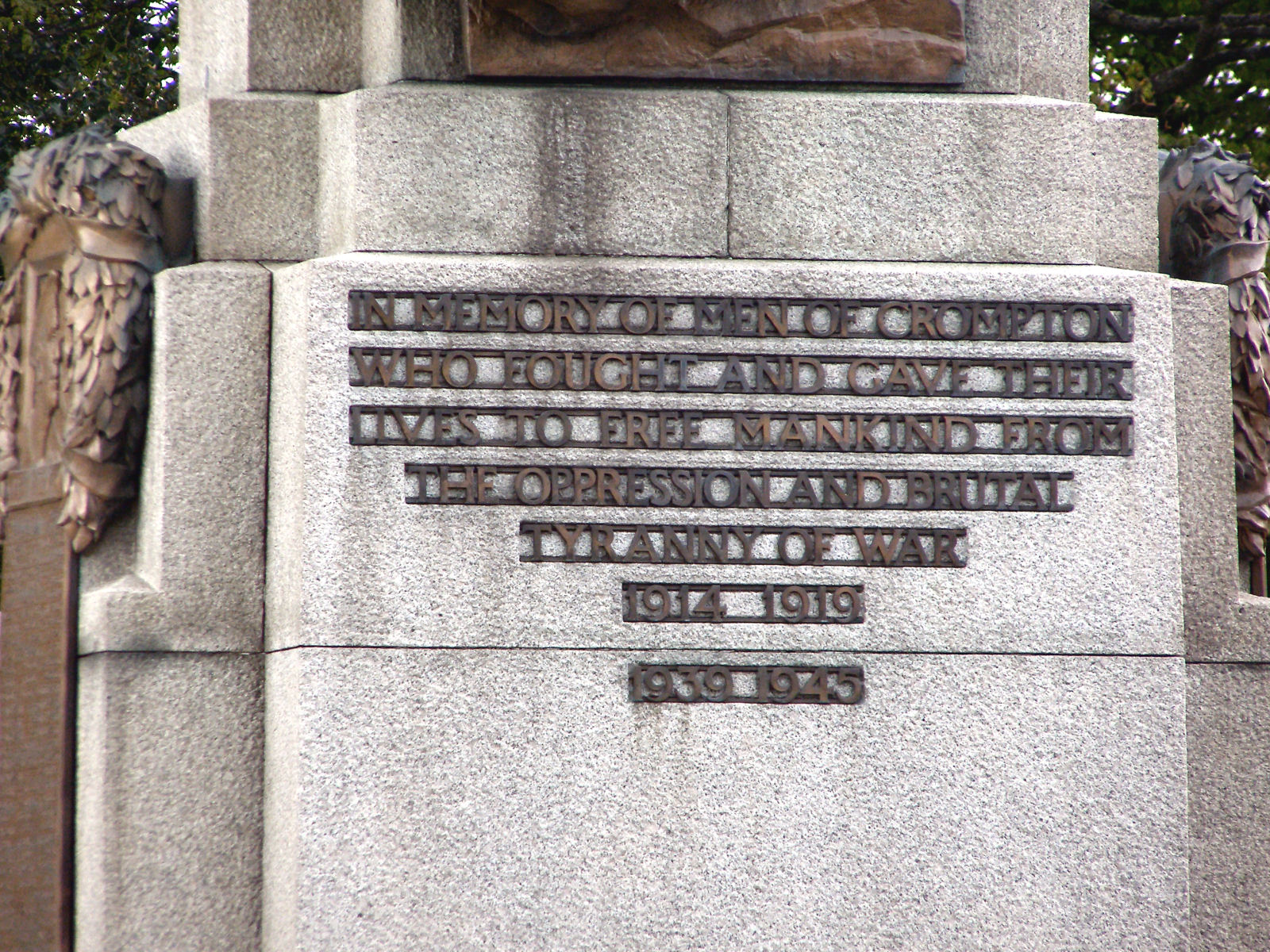
Dedication on the front (south) face

== See also ==
- Grade II* listed buildings in Greater Manchester
- Listed buildings in Shaw and Crompton
