= Margaret MacDonald Memorial =

Sculpture by Richard Reginald Goulden

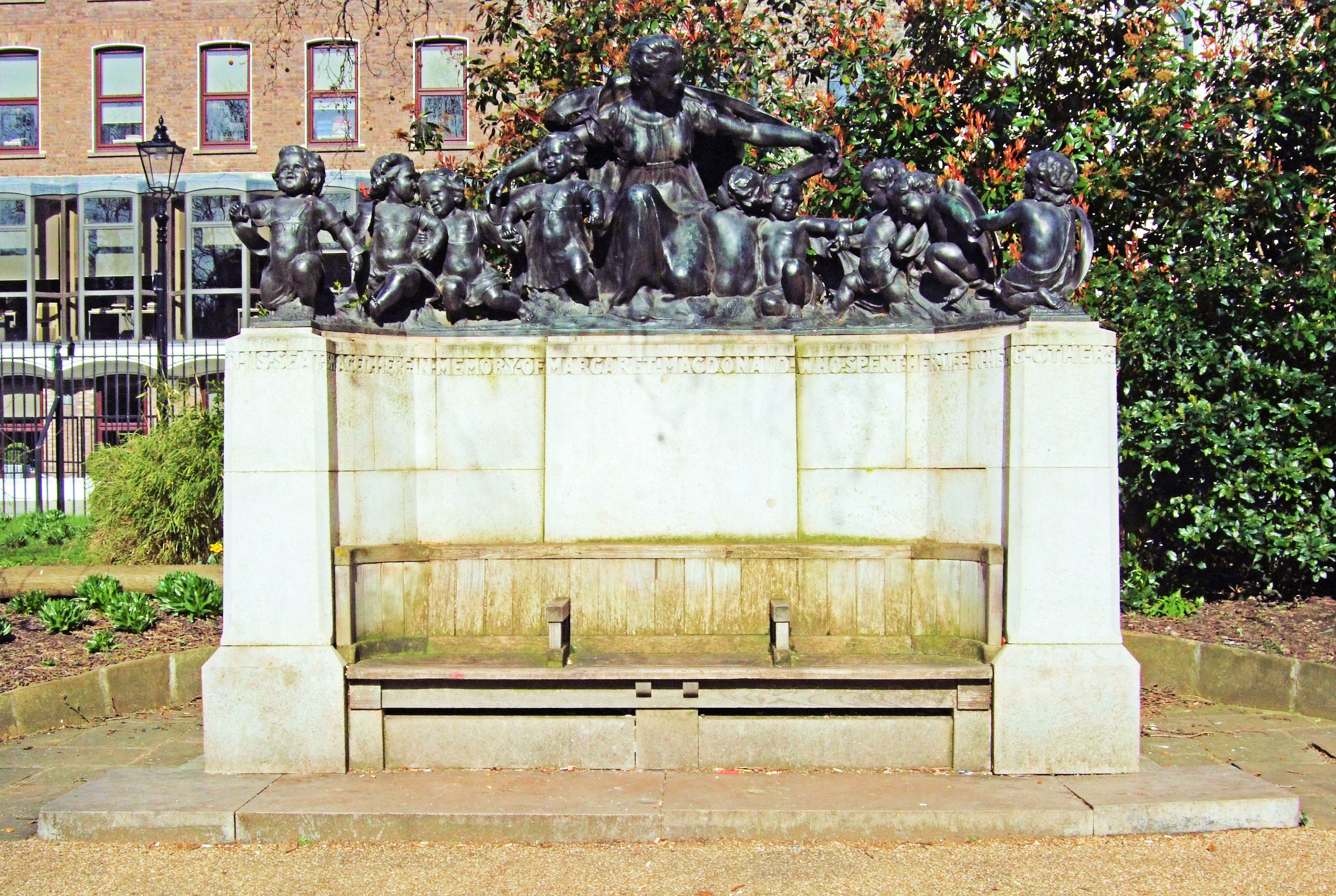
- Memorial to Margaret MacDonald, by Richard Reginald Goulden, at Lincoln's Inn Fields in London
- Artist: Richard Reginald Goulden
- Medium: Granite and bronze
- Subject: Margaret Ethel MacDonald
- Designation: Grade II listed
- Location: Lincoln's Inn Fields; London

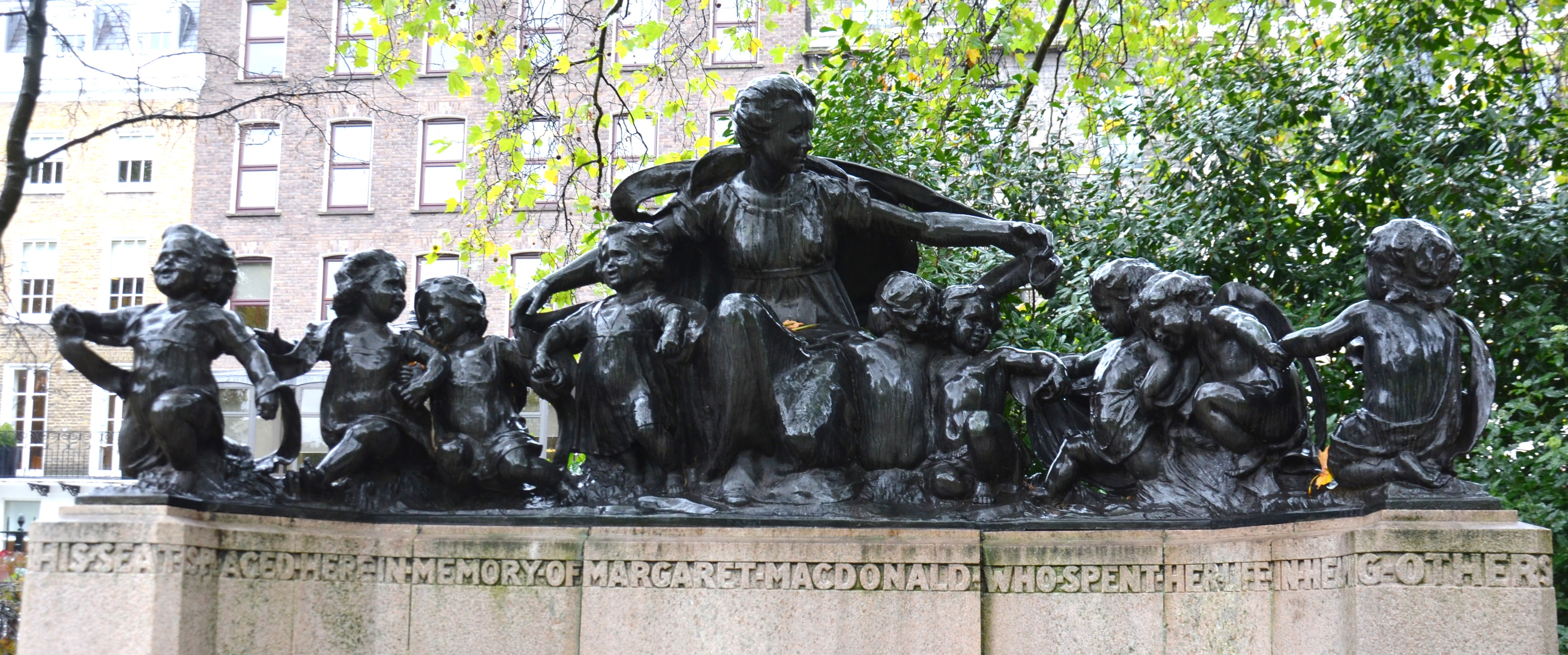
Detail of the bronze sculptural group

The Margaret MacDonald Memorial is a sculpture by Richard Reginald Goulden, beside the path at the north edge of the public park at Lincoln's Inn Fields, London. It became a grade II listed structure in 1974.

Margaret Ethel MacDonald (1870–1911) was a British feminist and social reformer, and the wife of the Labour politician Ramsay MacDonald. The couple lived at 3 Lincoln's Inn Fields, and had six children. She died from blood poisoning in 1911, many years before he became the Labour Party's first prime minister in 1924.

The memorial comprises a public seat within an alcove created by a granite surround, on which is mounted a bronze sculptural group portraying MacDonald kneeling with her arms outstretched protectively around a group of nine cherubic infant children who are laughing and playing. An inscription carved below the top edge of the stone surround reads: THIS SEAT IS IN MEMORY OF MARGARET MACDONALD WHO SPENT HER LIFE IN HELPING OTHERS.

A bronze plaque mounted on the back of the seat list biographical details of her birth, marriage, and life: SHE WAS THE DAUGHTER OF JOHN & MARGARET GLADSTONE / SHE WAS BORN IN KENSINGTON IN 1870 · WAS MARRIED TO / RAMSAY MACDONALD IN 1896 AND LIVED WITH HIM AT / 3 LINCOLN'S INN FIELDS ·· HERE HER CHILDREN WERE / BORN AND HERE SHE DIED IN 1911 · SHE BROUGHT JOY / TO THOSE WITH WHOM AND FOR WHOM SHE LIVED AND / WORKED · HER HEART WENT OUT IN FELLOWSHIP TO HER / FELLOW WOMEN & IN LOVE TO THE CHILDREN OF THE PEOPLE / WHOM SHE SERVED AS A CITIZEN AND HELPED AS A SISTER · / SHE QUICKENED FAITH AND ZEAL IN OTHERS BY HER LIFE AND / TOOK NO REST FROM DOING GOOD.

The bronze sculpture was made by Goulden, to a design which has been attributed to MacDonald's widower, and cast at A. B. Burton's foundry in Thames Ditton. It was made c. 1911 and unveiled in Lincoln's Inn Fields in December 1914, close to Sir John Soane's Museum at 13 Lincoln's Inn Fields. Goulden's obituary in The Times in August 1932 listed it among his three most outstanding works in London, alongside the Bank of England War Memorial and the St Michael Cornhill War Memorial, and a review of his memorial exhibition in April 1933 described it as "one of the most completely satisfying recent monuments in London".
