= Jimmy (musical) =

- Original Broadway Cast Recording
- Music: Bill Jacob
- Lyrics: Patti Jacob
- Book: Melville Shavelson
- Productions: 1969 Broadway

Jimmy is a musical with a score by Bill Jacob, lyrics by Patti Jacob, dance arrangements by John Berkman, and a book by Melville Shavelson and Morrie Ryskind. The musical describes the rise and fall of New York City Mayor Jimmy Walker, whose career was marred by corruption. It was a romanticized version of Walker's tenure as mayor, as presented in the 1957 film Beau James, starring Bob Hope. The film came from a biography of Walker, also titled Beau James, written by Gene Fowler.

Jimmy had a brief Broadway run from October 1969 to January 1970, starring Frank Gorshin as Walker, Anita Gillette as Betty Compton, and Julie Wilson. Jack L. Warner and Don Saxon produced the original Broadway production under the direction of Joseph Anthony. It closed after 8 previews and 84 performances.
