= St Michael Cornhill War Memorial =

War memorial in London

- United Kingdom
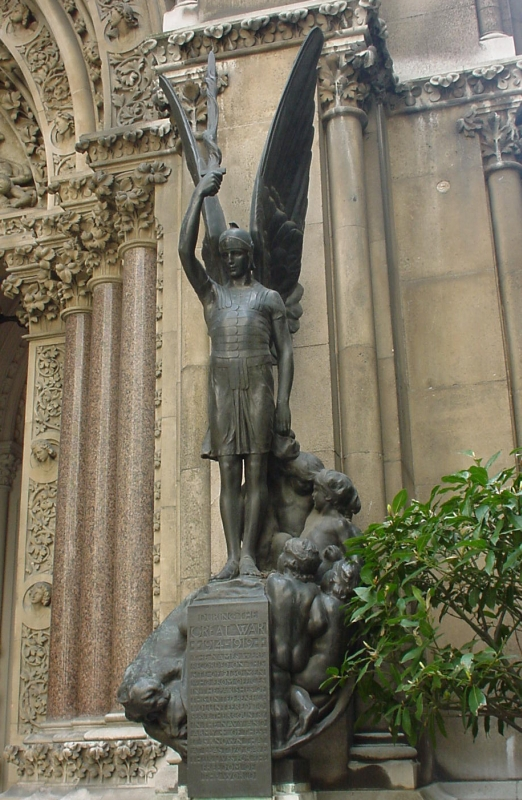
- For 2,130 men from the parish – and the neighbouring City of London parishes of St Peter le Poer and St Benet Fink – who served in the British armed forces in the First World War
- Established: 1 November 1920
- Location: 51°30′47.9″N 00°05′08.4″W; St Michael Cornhill near London
- Designed by: Richard Reginald Goulden
- DURING THE / GREAT WAR / 1914–1919 / THE NAMES WERE / RECORDED ON THIS / SITE OF 2130 MEN / WHO FROM OFFICES / IN THE PARISHES OF / THIS UNITED BENEFICE / VOLUNTEERED TO / SERVE THEIR COUNTRY / IN THE NAVY AND / ARMY + OF THESE / IT IS KNOWN THAT / AT LEAST 170 GAVE / THEIR LIVES FOR THE / FREEDOM OF / THE WORLD

St Michael Cornhill War Memorial is a First World War memorial by the entrance to the church of St Michael Cornhill, facing Cornhill in the City of London. The memorial became a Grade II* listed building in December 2016 ; the church itself is Grade I listed.

== Commemoration ==
The memorial commemorates 2,130 men from the parish – and the neighbouring City of London parishes of St Peter le Poer and St Benet Fink with which it was merged in 1906 – who served in the British armed forces in the First World War. About 170 died in the war, listed on a roll of honour kept in the church.

== Description ==
It was designed by Richard Reginald Goulden; he had served in the Royal Engineers during the war. A maquette is held by the Imperial War Museum. The completed 4 metres (13 ft) high memorial comprises a Portland stone pylon, topped by a bronze sculptural group cast by the foundry of A.B. Burton in Thames Ditton. The main figure of the sculpture depicts a standing Archangel Michael with wings erect, wearing Roman segmented armour and a helmet, holding up a flaming sword. By the angel's right foot are two lions, one biting the other, representing war; by the left foot are four putti looking upwards, representing peace.

The angelic figure stands on a cast bronze block, which bears the inscription: DURING THE / GREAT WAR / 1914–1919 / THE NAMES WERE / RECORDED ON THIS / SITE OF 2130 MEN / WHO FROM OFFICES / IN THE PARISHES OF / THIS UNITED BENEFICE / VOLUNTEERED TO / SERVE THEIR COUNTRY / IN THE NAVY AND / ARMY + OF THESE / IT IS KNOWN THAT / AT LEAST 170 GAVE / THEIR LIVES FOR THE / FREEDOM OF / THE WORLD.

== Unveiling ==
The memorial was unveiled on 1 November 1920 at a ceremony attended by the Lord Mayor of London James Roll, with the Rector of the church Rev John Henry Joshua Ellison, and the Archdeacon of London Ernest Holmes. The London Troops War Memorial was unveiled outside the Royal Exchange just 11 days later.

== Similar works by the same artist ==
Goulden designed several other war memorials in the 1920s, including the Bank of England War Memorial nearby, others in or near London at Middlesex Guildhall, Redhill and Kingston, and some further afield, at Brightlingsea, Dover, Gateshead, and Malvern. The Malvern memorial also includes an angelic figure with wings erect; others – such as Redhill, Kingston and Dover – feature a figure without wings but holding an object aloft.

== Copies ==
A copy of the St Michael memorial was unveiled in 1927 by Field Marshall Lord Plumer at the Chapeau Rouge crossroads near La Groise in France, on the road from Landrecies to Guise, as a memorial to the 1st Division BEF, which retreated past the location in 1914 and advanced past it again in 1918. A similar sculpture is the centrepiece of the war memorial of Hornsey County School, Pemberton Road, Harringay, which was moved to St Paul's Church, Harringay in 1970 but damaged in a fire in 1984, and now on display at Hornsey Town Hall.

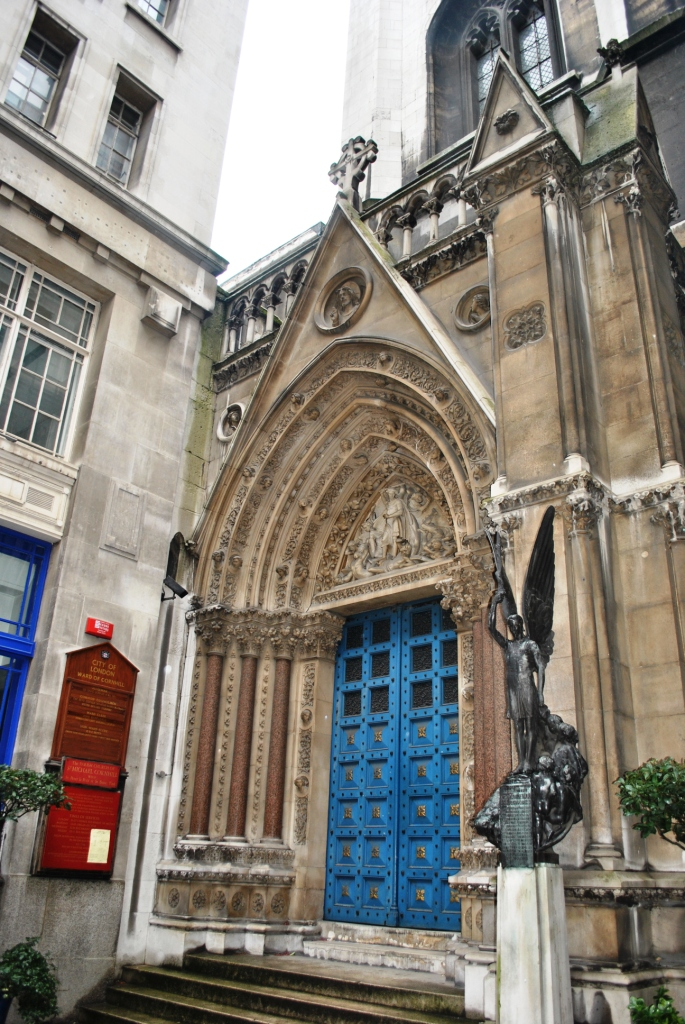
Entrance to St Michael, Cornhill

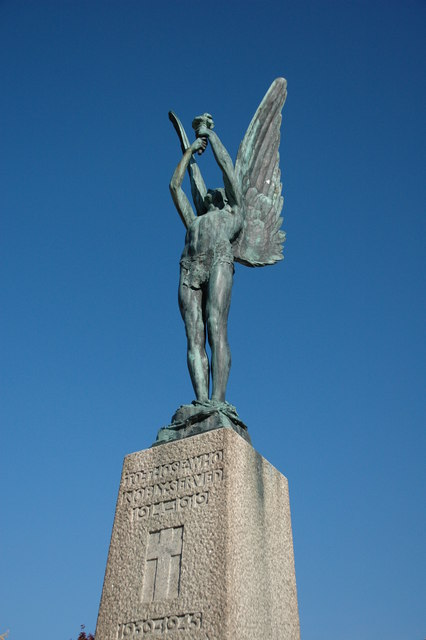
Malvern

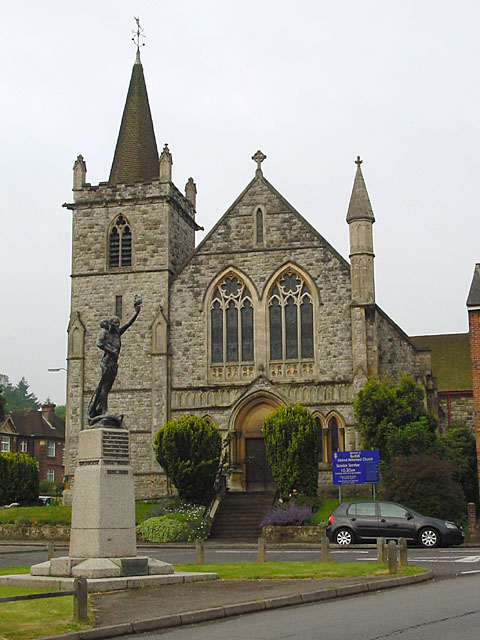
Redhill

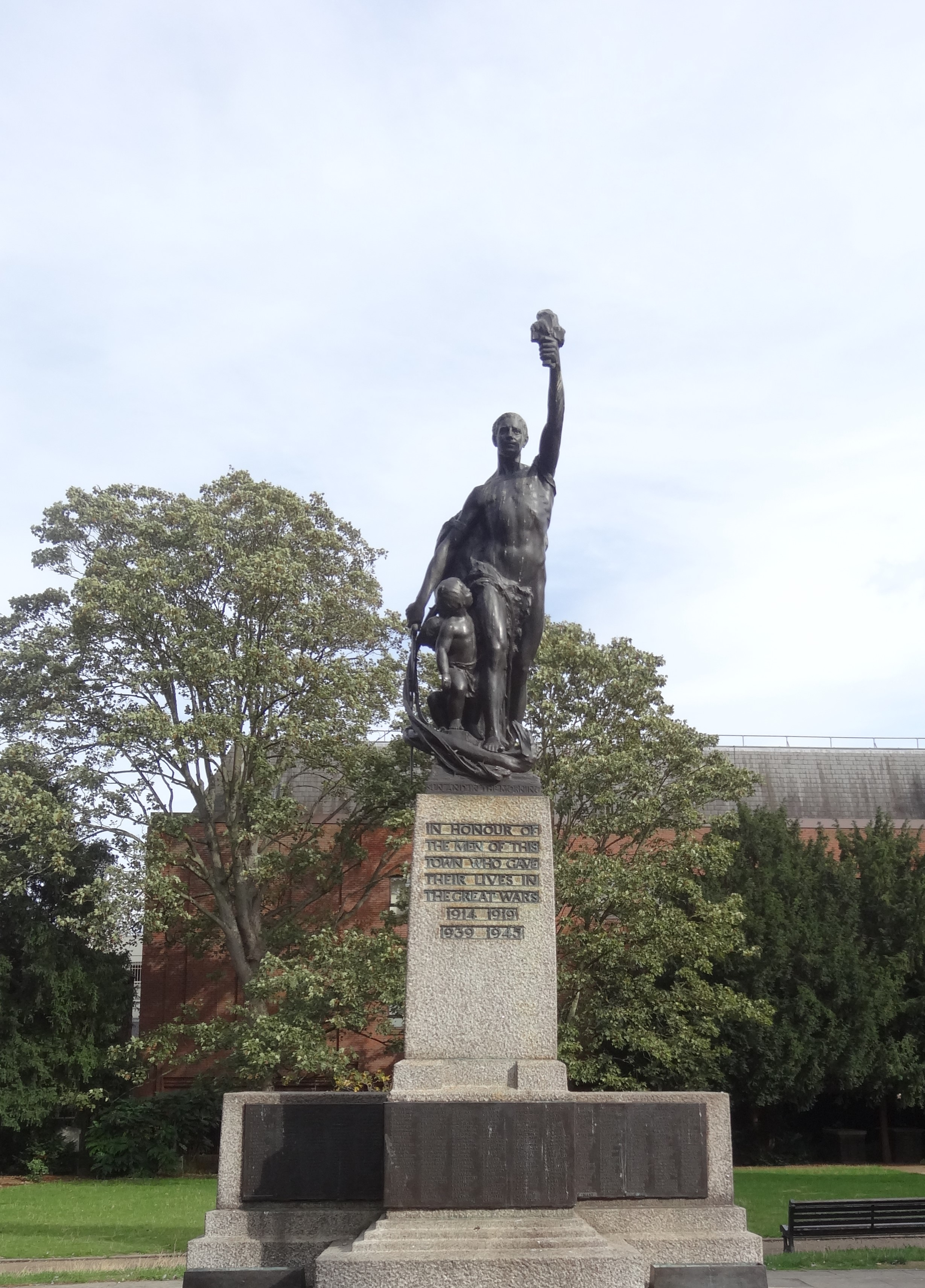
Kingston

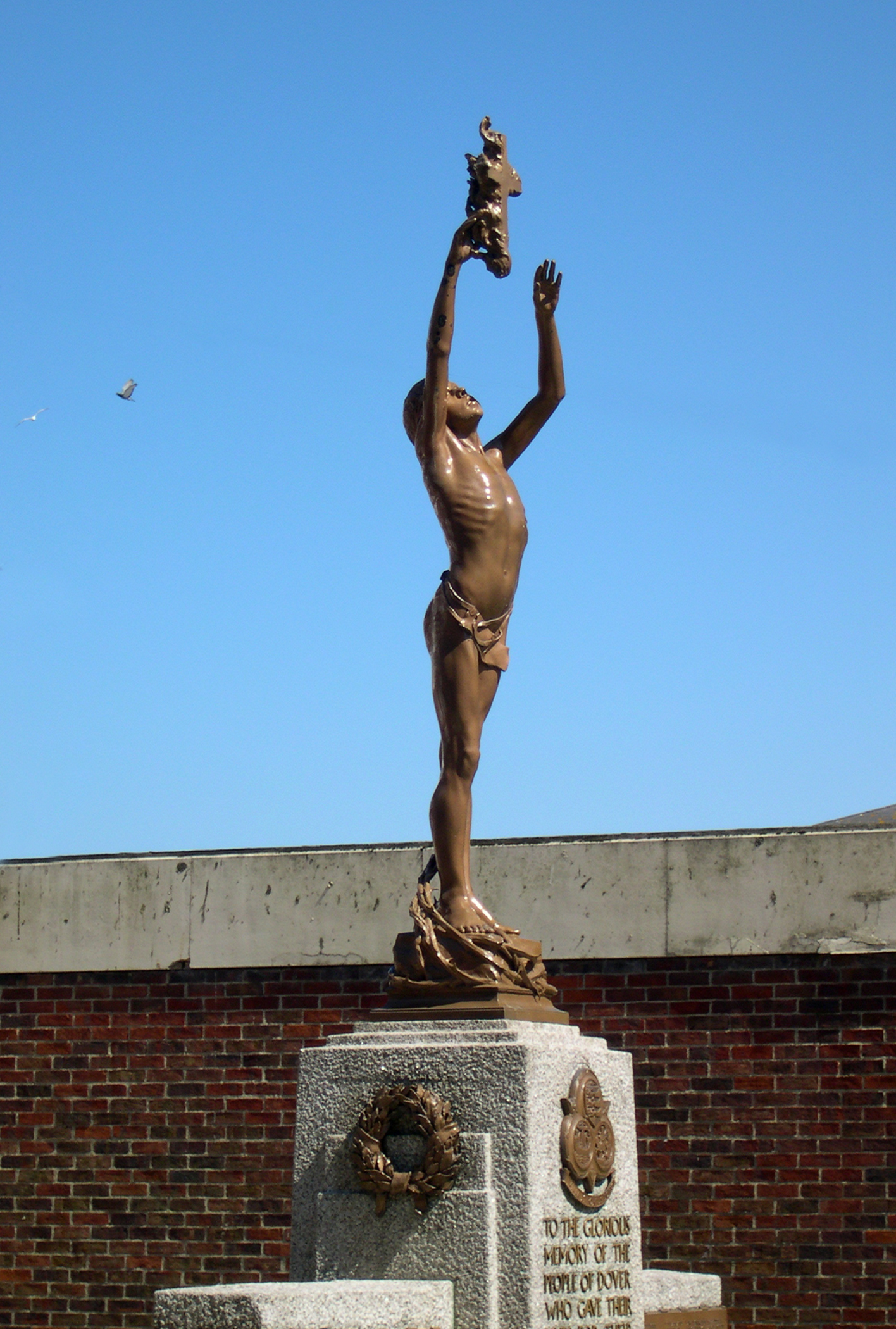
Dover

== See also ==
- Grade II* listed war memorials in England
