= Listed buildings in Shaw and Crompton =

Shaw and Crompton is a civil parish in the Metropolitan Borough of Oldham, Greater Manchester, England. It contains 19 listed buildings that are recorded in the National Heritage List for England. Of these, one is listed at Grade II*, the middle grade, and the others are at Grade II, the lowest grade. The parish contains the town of Shaw and Crompton and the surrounding countryside. Most of the listed buildings are farmhouses, farm buildings, houses and cottages, many of them dating from the late 18th century. The other listed buildings include an ancient cross shaft, churches, a lych gate, and a war memorial.

== Key ==
Grade	Criteria
II*	Particularly important buildings of more than special interest
II	Buildings of national importance and special interest

== Buildings ==
Name and location	Photograph	Date	Notes	Grade
Former cross shaft 53.57472°N 2.09888°W	—	Medieval (probable)	The cross shaft is in the churchyard of Holy Trinity Church. It is in stone and is rectangular with chamfered corners, and on each face is a carved arch. It stands on a concrete base, and has a sundial head from the 19th century.	II
Top Green Hill Farmhouse and barn 53.58844°N 2.11501°W	—	1649 (possible)	The farmhouse and barn to the right are in stone. The house has a slate roof to its main part, and a stone-slate roof on the rear wing. There are two storeys, two bays, a rear wing, and the windows are mullioned, with a continuous hood mould above the ground floor windows. The barn has an asbestos roof, and two blocked cart entrances.	II
Burn Farmhouse and barn 53.57762°N 2.06368°W	—	Mid-18th century	The farmhouse and attached barn to the left are in stone with a stone-slate roof. The house has two storeys and two bays, and an outshut at the rear. On the front is a doorway, and the windows are mullioned. The barn has a large segmental-arched cart entrance.	II
1, 2, 3 and 8 Pingot; 53.58676°N 2.07862°W		Late 18th century	Four stone houses with an eaves cornice and a stone-slate roof. Nos. 1 and 2 were originally one house, and Nos. 3 and 8 were originally back-to-back. They have three storeys and four bays. The windows are mullioned, and on the upper floor of the left gable end is a blocked taking-in door.	II
2 and 3 Mark Lane; 53.57644°N 2.08490°W	—	Late 18th century	A pair of stone houses with tiled roofs. They have two storeys, one bay each, and mullioned windows.	II
9 Higher Park; 53.59148°N 2.08518°W	—	Late 18th century	A stone house with a slate roof, it was formerly three cottages. The main part has a single-depth plan, two storeys and three bays, and the whole front is gabled. It has a 20th-century porch and mullioned windows. At the rear is an earlier lower two-storey wing.	II
368–376 Rochdale Road; 53.58165°N 2.10943°W	—	Late 18th century	A row of five stone houses, most of which are rendered or pebbledashed, with a stone-slate roof. They have two storeys, a double-depth plan, and each house has one bay with a door to the right. The windows have three lights and are mullioned. The roof is gabled on the left and hipped on the right.	II
848–864 Ripponden Road; 53.57140°N 2.06036°W		Late 18th century	A row of nine stone cottages with a stone flagged roof. They have a double-depth plan, two low storeys, and each cottage has one bay. The doorways have heavy stone lintels, and each cottage has a three-light mullioned window.	II
Moorfield House and Moorfield Cottage (right bay); 53.58167°N 2.10888°W	—	Late 18th century	A stone house with a brick gable end, a sill band, an eaves cornice, a blocking course, and a slate roof. It has a double-depth plan, two storeys and three bays. The windows are mullioned.	II
Stockfield Farmhouse; 53.58737°N 2.11791°W	—	Late 18th century	A stone farmhouse with a gable end in brick and a stone-slate roof. It has a double-depth plan, two storeys with an attic, and two bays, and the windows are mullioned.	II
4 and 5 Mark Lane; 53.57641°N 2.08471°W		1798	A pair of stone houses with quoins and a stone-slate roof. Each house has three storeys and one bay. The windows are mullioned.	II
Birshaw House; 53.56957°N 2.09533°W	—	Early 19th century	A stone house on a plinth with rusticated quoins, an eaves cornice, and a hipped slate roof. There are two storeys and three bays. Above the door is an ornate radial fanlight and a flat hood on consoles. There is one casement window, and the other windows are sashes.	II
New Bank; 53.56753°N 2.09888°W	—	Early 19th century	A rendered brick house with an eaves cornice and a slate roof. It has a double-depth plan, two storeys, five bays, and extensions at the rear. The central doorway has 3/4 columns, a radial fanlight, and an open pediment. The windows are sashes, and the window above the door has a keystone.	II
Park Farmhouse; 53.58963°N 2.08737°W	—	Early 19th century	A stone farmhouse on a plinth, with quoins, a sill band, an eaves cornice, and a stone-slate roof. It has a double-depth plan, two storeys with a basement, three bays, and a stair wing at the rear. The central doorway is approached by steps, and has 3/4 Doric columns, a radial fanlight, and an open pediment. The windows are sashes, and at the rear is an arched stair window.	II
St James' Church; 53.58096°N 2.09256°W		1847	A Commissioners' church in Gothic Revival style, it is in stone on a plinth, and has a slate roof. The church consists of a nave with a clerestory, north and south aisles, a chancel with a vestry and organ chamber, and a southwest steeple. The steeple has a three-stage tower, an octagonal stair turret, clasping buttresses, a broach spire with gabled lucarnes, and a crocketed finial.	II
St Paul's Methodist Chapel and Sunday school 53.57846°N 2.09438°W	—	1863	The chapel and Sunday school are in stone with slate roofs, the Sunday school being added in 1871, and both have two storeys. The chapel has a projecting porch with corner antae and Doric columns, and an entablature. On the entrance front are rusticated corner pilasters, a sill band, arched sash windows, a modillion cornice, and a pediment with an oculus and volute decoration. Along the sides are two tiers of sash windows, and in front of the chapel are cast iron railings and gates. The Sunday school behind the chapel has a central pediment, doors with pilasters, fanlights, and keystones, and arched windows with keystones.	II
Holy Trinity Church; 53.57534°N 2.09930°W		1870–71	The church is in stone with a slate roof. It consists of a nave with a clerestory, north and south aisles, a south transept, a chancel with chapels and a vestry, and a tower at the crossing. The tower has an octagonal stair turret, clock faces, and a pyramidal roof. In the transept is a rose window, and the east window has five lights and Gothic tracery.	II
Lych gate, Holy Trinity Church; 53.57469°N 2.09853°W	—	c. 1870	The lych gate at the entrance to the churchyard is in stone. It has a hipped slate roof carried by side walls with moulded bands and pierced roundels. On the top is a wrought iron weathervane, and the gates are in cast iron.	II
Crompton War Memorial; 53.57522°N 2.09599°W		1923	The war memorial stands in public gardens, and was designed by Richard Reginald Goulden. It consists of a two-stepped plinth and a pedestal in Aberdeen granite on which is a bronze statue depicting a nude man defending young children from beasts. On the front of the pedestal is an inscription, and on the sides are the names of those lost in the world wars.	II*
