= Edward Cobden =

British divine and poet

Edward Cobden (1684 – 2 April 1764) was a British divine, poet, and Archdeacon of London, from 1742 to 1764.

== Life ==
Cobden was the son of William Cobden of Haslemere, Surrey. He was educated at Winchester College, and matriculated at Trinity College, Oxford in 1702, graduating B.A. in 1706; moving to King's College, Cambridge, he graduated M.A. in 1713, then returned to Oxford, graduating B.D. and D.D. in 1723.

Edmund Gibson, Bishop of Lincoln, to whom he was chaplain, gave him the prebend of Erpingham in Lincoln Cathedral in 1721, the prebend of Buckden in 1726, resigned 1727; a prebend in St. Paul's, the united rectories of St. Austin and St. Faith, with that of Acton, Middlesex, in 1730; the chaplaincy to George II, 1730; and the archdeaconry of London, in which he succeeded Robert Tyrwhit, in 1742.

He fell from his horse in 1749, and seriously impaired his memory. In 1751, he was elected president of Sion College, and in 1752 resigned his warrant for chaplain. He says all his preferments together did not amount to £350. a year clear. Soon after he met with losses of £2,000.

Edward Cobden died on 22 April 1764. His wife, a daughter of the Rev. Mr. Jessop of Tempsford, Bedfordshire, died in 1762.

== Works ==
Cobden's early work A Letter from a Minister to his Parishioner, upon his Building a Meeting-House, London, 1718 marked him out as a High Churchman. It was followed by A Poem on the death of Joseph Addison, 1720. In 1753 appeared Concio ad Clerum, and in 1755 An Essay tending to promote Religion, London, a piece half prose and half verse, making clear show his disappointment at not having a canonry of St Paul's Cathedral to add to the archdeaconry. He speaks of his chaplaincy, and affirms that the reward received for his 22 years' service was one meal a fortnight and no salary.

Cobden published nine sermons separately. One, delivered at St. James's before George II in 1748 on Genesis 39:9, led eventually to the resignation of his chaplaincy. He published it in 1749, under the title A Persuasive to Chastity. It had been censured, and the preacher had been lampooned in a court ballad. William Whiston calls it "that seasonable and excellent sermon" delivered "when crime between the sexes was at its greatest height". In 1748, he published a volume entitled Poems on several Occasions, London, printed for the widow of a clergyman, formerly his curate. In this work he eulogises Stephen Duck's poetic fame, glorifies somebody's squirrel and a lady's canary, and laments over a dead cow.

In 1756, Cobden published A Poem sacred to the Memory of Queen Anne for her Bounty to the Clergy, London. In 1757, he published a collection called Twenty-eight Discourses on various Subjects and Occasions, London, and the next year, when residing at Acton, he republished the whole of his works, under the title of Discourses and Essays in Prose and Verse.
