= Frank Harvey (priest) =

Anglican priest

Francis William Harvey (28 September 1930 – 10 November 1986) was an Anglican priest of the second half of the 20th century.

He was educated at Chester College and ordained in 1962. He was a curate at St Ann's Rainhill and then vicar of St Mark's Edge Lane. He was the Diocese of Liverpool's planning adviser and then the area secretary of the London Diocesan Fund and later its pastoral secretary. In 1978 he became Archdeacon of London, and died in post, aged 56.

== Notes ==
Church of England titles
Preceded by Samuel Mostyn Forbes Woodhouse	Archdeacon of London; 1978 – 1986	Succeeded by George Henry Cassidy
