= Sam Woodhouse =

English Anglican priest

Samuel Mostyn Forbes Woodhouse (28 April 1912 – 13 October 1995) was an English Anglican priest who became the Archdeacon of London.

He was born into an ecclesiastical family on 28 April 1912, educated at Shrewsbury and Christ Church, Oxford and ordained in 1937. He was a curate at Lancaster Priory and then, during World War II, a chaplain to the British Armed Forces he was mentioned in dispatches three times. When peace returned he was vicar of Holy Trinity, South Shore, Blackpool then rural dean of Leominster. In 1957 he became rector of St Stephen's Bristol and after a decade there became the Archdeacon of London.

He retired in 1978 and died on 13 October 1995.

== Notes ==
Church of England titles
Preceded by Martin Gloster Sullivan	Archdeacon of London; 1967 – 1978	Succeeded by Francis William Harvey
