= Ernest Sharpe =

Anglican priest (1866 - 1949)

Ernest Newton Sharpe (1866 – January 1949) was an eminent Anglican Priest in the 20th century.

He was born into an ecclesiastical family in 1866 and educated at Westminster and Clare College, Cambridge. Ordained in 1890, he began his career with a curacy at Bath Abbey. Following this he was Vicar of Emanuel Church, West Hampstead then Rector of Kersal. After this he was Rector of Holy Trinity, Marylebone, then vicar of St James's Church, Paddington. A Prebendary then Canon of St Paul's Cathedral, he was Archdeacon of London from 1930 to 1947.
He died on 20 January 1949.

== Notes ==
Church of England titles
Preceded by Ernest Edward Holmes	Archdeacon of London; 1930 – 1947	Succeeded by Oswin Harvard Gibbs-Smith
