= Richard Reginald Goulden =

British sculptor

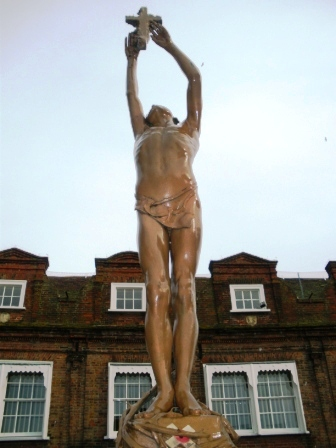
- The Dover War Memorial
- Born: 30 August 1876; Dover, England
- Died: 1932 (aged 55–56)
- Education: Royal College of Art
- Known for: Sculpture

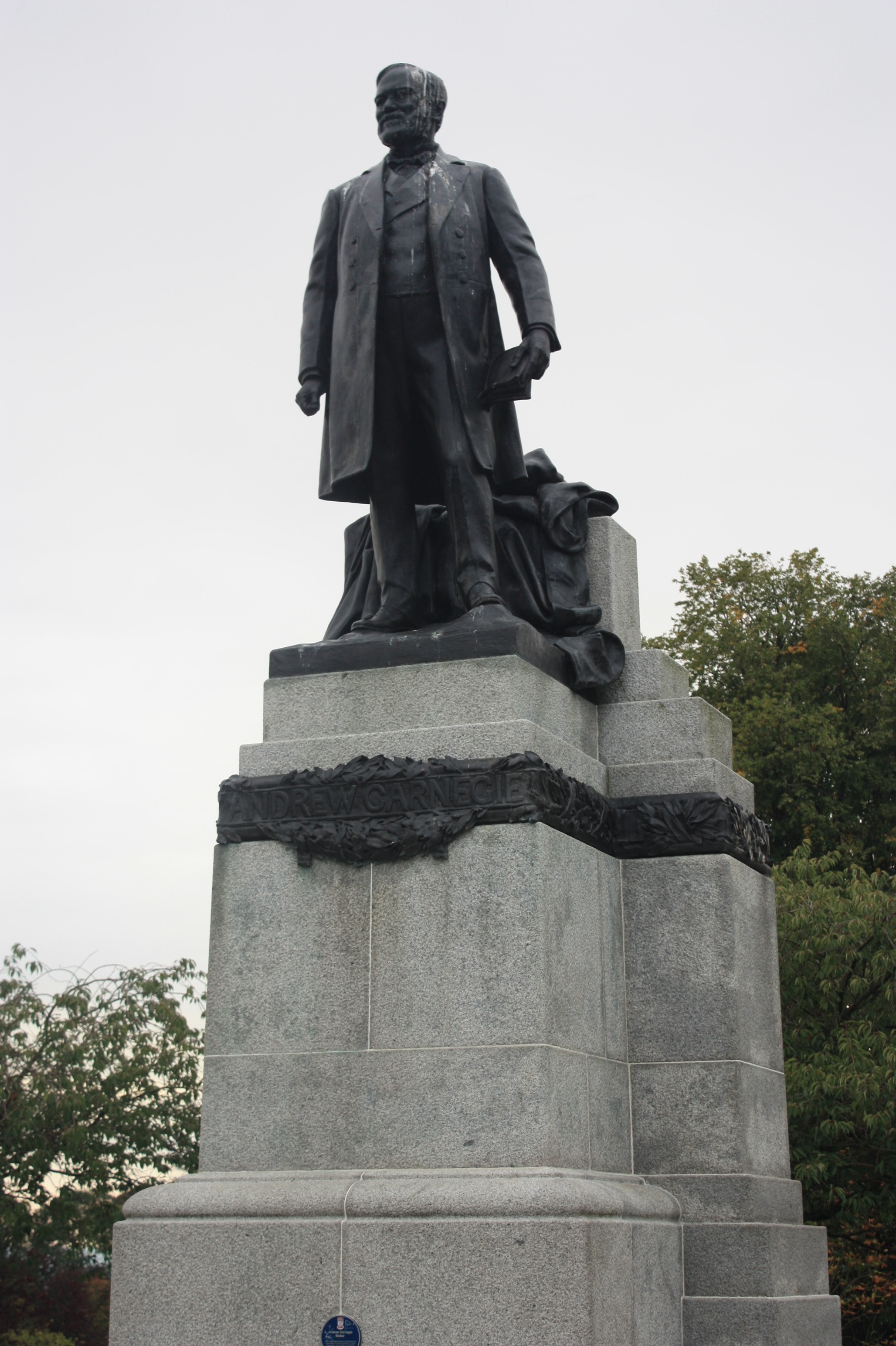
Andrew Carnegie by Richard Goulden. 1914, Pittencrieff Park, Dunfermline

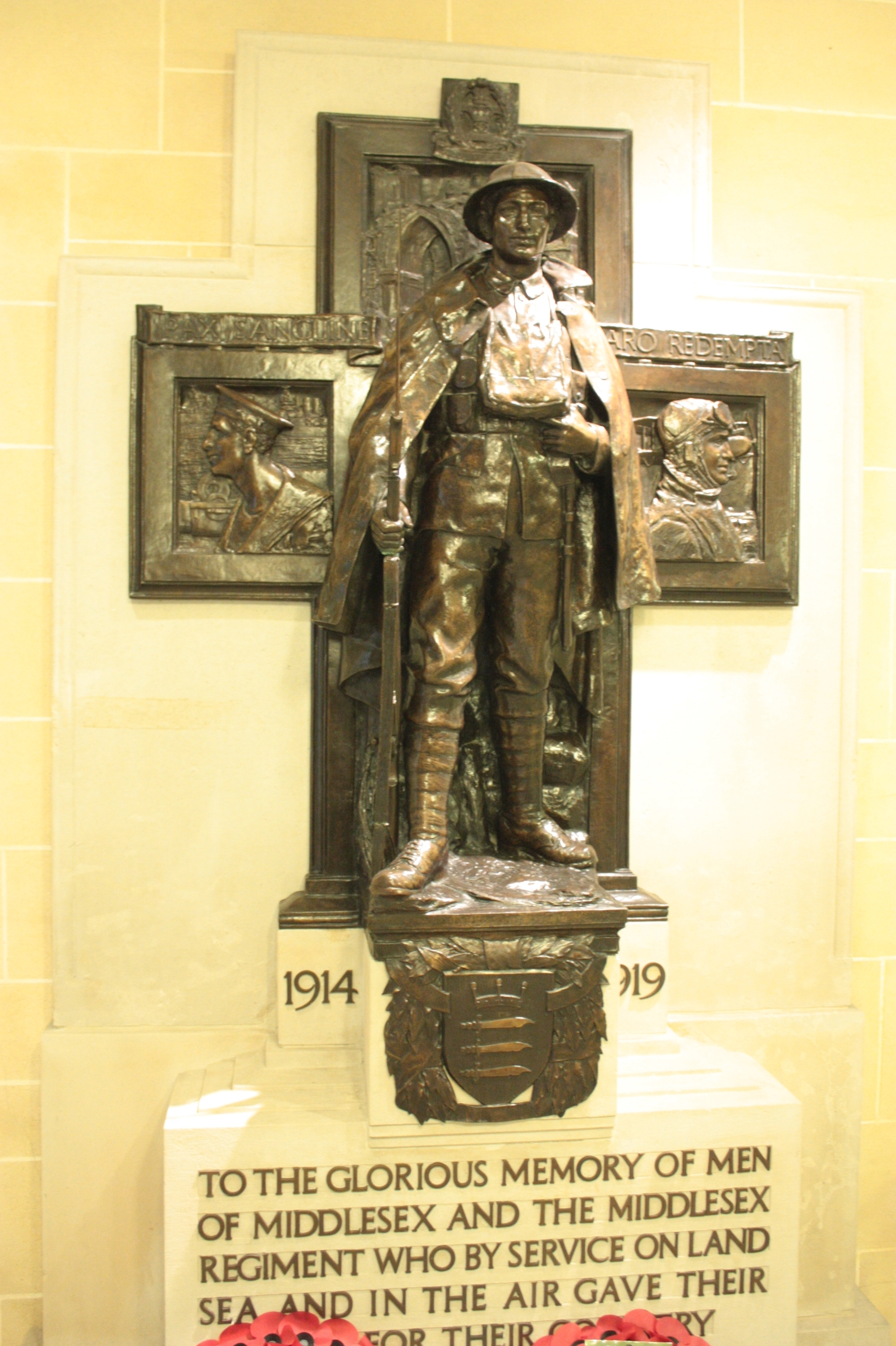
War Memorial by Richard Goulden, Supreme Court of UK, Westminster, London

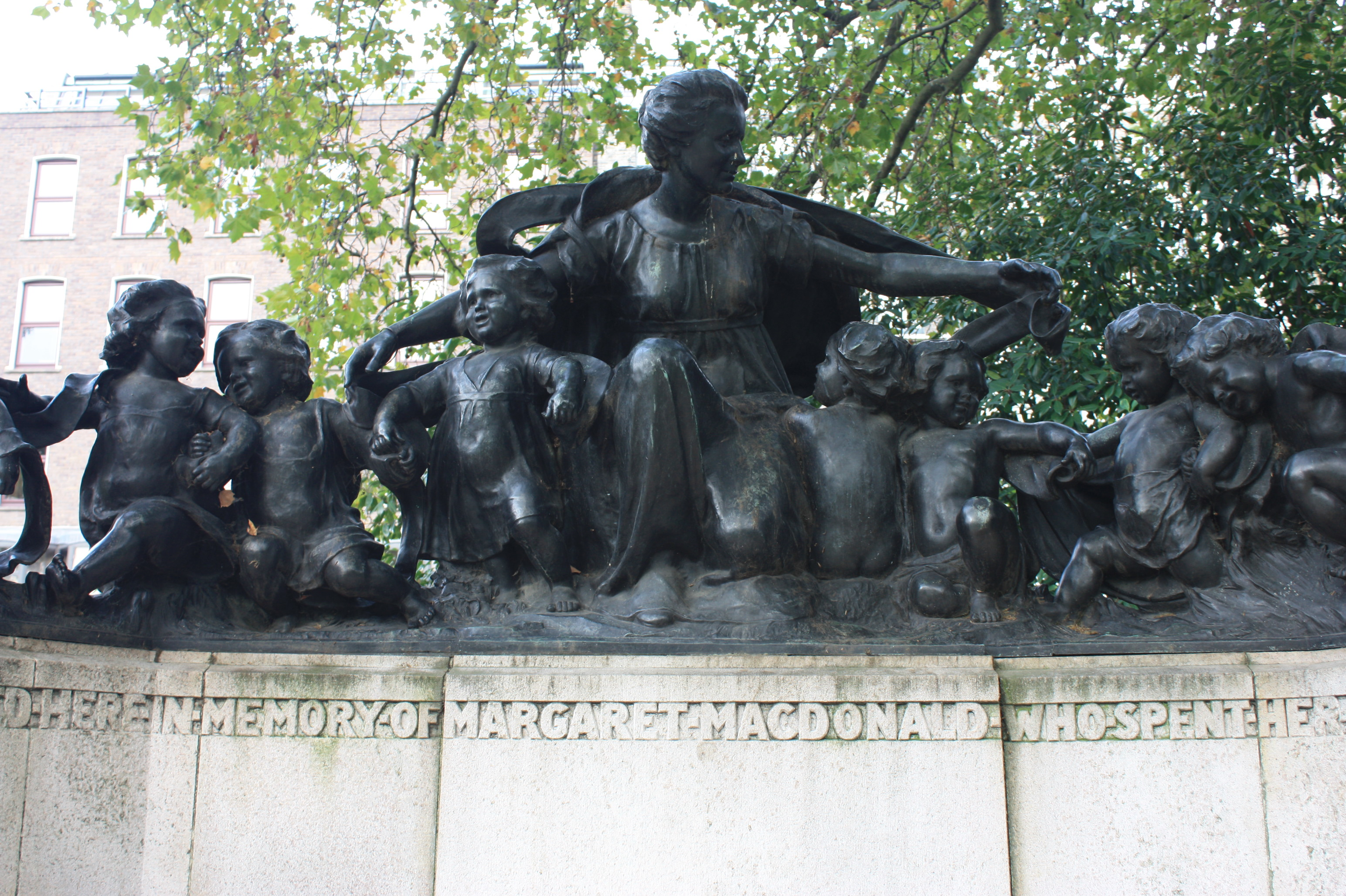
Memorial to Margaret MacDonald, by Richard Goulden, in the garden of Lincoln's Inn Fields, London

Richard Reginald Goulden (1876–1932) was a British sculptor operational in the early 20th century.

== Background ==
Richard Reginald Goulden was born in Dover on 30 August 1876 and christened at St. Mary's, Dover, on 1 October 1876. He was one of the four children of John James Goulden, born in Canterbury in 1841, and his wife Charlotte, née Wright, who was born at Witney, Oxfordshire. The couple were married at Ducklington in 1871.

His father, although trained as a journeyman cabinet-maker, set up a bookselling, stationery, and printing business in Dover in 1865, followed by a branch in Folkestone. He died when Richard was only three and his wife carried on the business until 1902.

Richard was educated at Dover College and at the Dover School of Art from where he won a scholarship to the Royal College of Art in London. There he firstly studied architecture and then sculpture. He was awarded prizes for both and a travelling scholarship for sculpture. When he returned from his travels he produced two panels for the Carnegie Trustees in Dunfermline and was invited to become their Art Advisor. Living in Dunfermline for two years, he executed several commissions, amongst them the fountain "Let Noble Ambition" and the statue of Carnegie himself. He also designed the Carnegie Hero medal.

During the Great War, Richard served with the Royal Engineers in France. He was "mentioned in despatches" on 30 April 1916 and given the rank of temporary captain. He was injured sufficiently to be sent back to England. There he spent some time at Brightlingsea in Essex where he was appointed adjutant to the Australian Engineers. He then moved to London where he was attached to the Chief Engineer of the Royal Engineers and put in command of a special emergency Corps.

Richard Goulden died on 6 August 1932, leaving a widow, Muriel Olive Cecile, née Gant, and their children Wilma Ruth and Michael. He was buried at Newhaven and as a tribute to him, a replica of the bronze figure on the Dover War Memorial was erected at Newhaven cemetery's entrance.

Goulden's last work was the memorial in Kensal Green cemetery to Thomas Power O'Connor, journalist and politician, completed just before Goulden died. In 1997 a one-and-a-half life-size statue of a Gurkha Soldier was unveiled at Whitehall. This was the work of Philip Jackson but it was Goulden who created a smaller and much earlier version of the work and this stands at the head of the Foreign Office main staircase in Whitehall. Philip Jackson had based his statue on Goulden's 1924 work.

=== Further details of Goulden's War Service ===
Goulden's service record is available at The National Archives under reference WO 374/28313. His service record contains a note of his promotion to temporary captain from 5 January 1916 to 19 June 1916 with 1/2 London Divisional Engineers and his record of service from 13 September 1914 to 24 June 1916 with 2/3 Field Company 2nd London Division. Royal Engineers- this lists various dates and activities/events, including the fact that he was awarded a "mention in despatches" on 30 April 1916. The file contains Army Form Z.3 covering his discharge on 25 July 1919. This describes his occupation in civil life as "Designer & Sculptor".

=== Exhibitions and Memberships of Societies ===
- Goulden exhibited at the Jubilee Exhibition of Works of Modern Artists organised by The Royal Glasgow Institute of the Fine Arts in 1911
- Goulden exhibited sixteen times at the Summer Exhibition of the Royal Academy of Arts between 1903 and 1932, this involving twenty-six works (portraits, medallions, statuettes, models for memorials and decorative schemes)
- He was an associate member of Royal Society of British Sculptors from 1923 to 1932.
- He was a member of Royal Society of British Sculptors from 1906 to 1932
- He was a member of Art Workers Guild from 1912 to 1932 and a committee member from 1928 to 1930.
- He was a member of the council of the Royal Society of British Sculptors from 1919 to 1926.

== Works ==
=== Various ===
Place	Location	Notes
Jacob's Fountain	Malvern	Goulden executed the bronze sculptures for this Malvern water fountain. The fountain which featured a bronze composition depicting four water babies, was paid for by public donations in 1929 as a permanent memorial to Dr Henry Jacob, a much loved local G.P. It was originally supplied with pure spring water piped from the Rushey Valley on the hills above Great Malvern.
The Victoria and Albert Museum		Goulden carved a high-relief portrait of George Frederic Watts for Aston Webb's façade of the Victoria and Albert Museum.
Statue of Andrew Carnegie	Dunfermline	Goulden worked with the Carnegie Trust in Dunfermline, Scotland, and produced bronze reliefs for the Carnegie Centre, and a fountain with a statue of entitled "Ambition" for the town's Pittencrieff Park, where Goulden's statue of Andrew Carnegie himself is located. See photograph in gallery below.
The Dolly Burton Memorial		Goulden created the bronze sculpture for the Dorothy Frances Victoria Burton Memorial in Kingston upon Thames Cemetery. Apart from the depiction of an angel, there is a bronze plaque which reads "In Sweetest Memory of Dorothy Frances Victoria /(Our darling Dolly)/younger daughter of/Arthur B and Florence L. Burton of Thames Ditton/Who, after a long and painful illness borne with patience and cheerfulness, passed peacefully away on/28th April 1908 in her 15th Year" Arthur Burton ran A. B. Burton, the founders who were responsible for casting so many of the notable bronzes of the early 20th century.
The Commemorative plaque to Eadweard Muybridge	Kingston-upon-Thames	This bronze wall plaque is held in store by the Kingston Museum and Heritage Service. It was originally located in the Kingston Upon Thames Library. The plaque was unveiled on 11 July 1931, to celebrate the centenary (1830–1930) of Muybridge's birth.
Memorial to Margaret Ramsay MacDonald	Lincoln's Inn Fields	Goulden created a bronze for this memorial to commemorate Ramsay MacDonald's wife Margaret MacDonald who was a social reformer and suffragette. She was well known for her charity work with the young. In Goulden's composition an angelic figure is surrounded by nine cherubic children. Margaret died before her husband became Prime Minister, and their daughter Isabel served as hostess for her father at No. 10. See photographs in gallery below.

=== War memorials ===
Work	Location	Notes
Middlesex County and Middlesex Regiment Memorial	Little George Street, Greater London	Goulden's Middlesex County and Middlesex Regiment Memorial is located in what is now the United Kingdom Supreme Court. It depicts a bronze figure standing at the entrance to a trench, with bronze panels behind forming a cross that shows a ruined cathedral, an airman with a plane, and a sailor with a ship. At the top of the cross are the arms of both the regiment and the county, while below is a wreath and a soldier. The inscription reads: "1914 1919/ To the glorious memory of men/of Middlesex and the Middlesex/Regiment who by service on Land/Sea and in the Air gave their/Lives for their Country" The memorial was unveiled on 20 November 1924 by Lieut General Sir Ivor Maxse.
Crompton War Memorial	Shaw and Crompton, Greater Manchester	This war memorial is located within a memorial garden on High Street, Shaw. The war memorial is situated within a memorial garden on High Street, Shaw. Goulden's composition depicts a male figure with a sword defending a group of young children while slaying a threatening beast. The inscription reads: "In memory of the men of Crompton/who fought and gave their/lives to free mankind from/The oppression and brutal/tyranny of war/1914 1919/(Names)" A total of 346 local men were killed in the Great War and 76 in the Second World War. The memorial was unveiled on 29 April 1923 by General Sir Ian Hamilton. See photographs in gallery below.
Brightlingsea War Memorial	Brightlingsea, Essex	Goulden had served part of his time in the army in Brightlingsea, so it was considered appropriate that he should design this memorial. It stands in a garden at Victoria Place and comprises a cenotaph with relief panels on two sides. The names of those commemorated are recorded on bronze plaques on the other two sides. One relief depicts three sailors, and the other shows three helmeted soldiers. A total of 108 men from Brightlingsea were killed in the 1914–1919 conflict and 23 in that of 1939–1945. The memorial was unveiled on 20 October 1921 by Brigadier General F. W. Towsey.
St Michael Cornhill War Memorial	Cornhill, City of London	The memorial features a bronze figure of St Michael surrounded by children and wild animals. St Michael holds a sword, and the statue is mounted on a stone plinth. The inscription reads: "During/the Great War/ 1914–1919/The names were recorded on this site of 2130 men who from the offices in the parishes of this United Benefice volunteered to serve their country in the Navy and the Army and of these it is known that at least 170 gave their lives for the freedom of the world" The memorial was unveiled by Sir James Roll, the Lord Mayor of London, on 1 November 1920.
Hornsey County School War Memorial	Hornsey, Crouch End, Greater London	This memorial was originally located in Hornsey County School, but following the school's restructuring in 1952 it was moved to St Paul's Church in Burgoyne Street. After the church was damaged by fire, the memorial was relocated to Hornsey Town Hall at Crouch End. The original inscription read: "Our School fellows (names)/ Vincit qui se vincit/1914/1918/Hornsey County School" A plaque kept next to the memorial states: "This memorial commemorates the scholars of Hornsey County School who were killed in the wars of 1914–1918 and 1939–1945./Originally housed in the school hall in Pemberton Road, Harringay, the memorial was removed in 1952 when the school ceased to be a Grammar School and was rehoused in St Paul's Church, Burgoyne Road, Harringay, which was closely associated with the school./During the disastrous fire which destroyed the church in 1984 the memorial was almost the only artifact which survived. It was hoped that it would be re-erected in the new St Paul's Church but a site in the church suitable to the Old Hornseyans Association could not be agreed upon with the church authorities. In 1995 Haringay Council agreed that the memorial should rest here in Hornsey Town Hall./ The bronze figure is by eminent sculptor, Richard Goulden FRBS, ARCA (1877–1932). A similar statue by the same sculptor stands outside St Michael's Church, Cornhill, London. Bronze sculptured figure of St Michael with children at his feet. Figures surmount plinth with school motto and Hornsey Coat of Arms. Below are two bronze plaques for WWII. Whole is mounted onto a wooden backboard. Another version of Goulden's statue was used for the 1st Division Memorial at Chapeau Rouge in France.
Dover War Memorial	Dover, Kent	A photograph of the Dover War Memorial is shown above. The memorial stands within the Garden of Remembrance on Biggin Street. The inscription reads: "To the glorious/memory of the/people of Dover/who gave their/lives for their/country in the/ Great War/1914–1919 1939–1945" In Goulden's composition, a bronze statue of a young boy holds a Holy Cross in his right hand. The figure stands on a plinth, flanked by granite walls bearing metal plaques inscribed with the names of those commemorated. In total, 782 men from Dover were killed in the First World War and 21 in the Second World War. The memorial was unveiled on 5 November 1924 by Vice Admiral Sir Roger Keyes.
Bank of England War Memorial	Threadneedle Street, City of London	The memorial features a bronze statue of St Christopher, the patron saint of the bank. He carries the Infant Christ, and the statue is set on a stone base. Three bronze plaques bearing the names of those commemorated are affixed to the base, which also incorporates a bronze cross. A bronze wreath lies on the ground in front of the base. The inscriptions read: "To the comrades who, at Duty's call, crossed the dark waters to the further shore 1914–1919" (names) and "To the memory of those who crossed the same waters 1939–1945 71 names are listed for the 1914–1919 conflict. The memorial was unveiled 11 November 1921 by Mr. M. Norman.
Kingston upon Thames War Memorial	Kingston-upon-Thames, Surrey	The Kingston-upon-Thames war memorial is in a small memorial garden on Church Street, formerly the site of an old burial ground. A male figure stands atop a plinth, holding a torch symbolising "self-sacrifice" and shielding a small child from harm. The composition was said to represent mankind’s triumphant struggle against life's difficulties. The plinth rests on a base and bears the names of 624 men from Kingston-upon-Thames who were killed in the Great War. The memorial also commemorates those who lost their lives in the Second World War, although their names are not listed. The plinth is made of stone, and the figures are cast in bronze. There are two inscriptions; that on the plinth reads: "In honour of/the men of this/town who gave/their lives/The Great Wars/1914–1919/1939–1945" and that on the base reads: "At the going down of the/sun and in the morning/we will remember them" The memorial was unveiled on 11 November 1923. See image in gallery below.
Reigate and Redhill War Memorial	Redhill, Surrey	The war memorial stands on London Road and consists of a stone plinth surmounted by a bronze sculpture by Goulden, depicting a man carrying a child in one arm and holding a torch aloft in the other. The inscription reads: "The bronze represents the triumphant struggle of mankind against the difficulties that beset him in the path of life. Shielding and bearing the child, the figure holds aloft the symbol of self-sacrifice to light the way. The flaming cross is used to indicate the suffering endured by men in the war. Flames consume the flesh. The spirit is unconquerable" One side of the plinth is inscribed: "IN MEMORY OF / MEN OF REIGATE / AND REDHILL WHO / FOUGHT AND GAVE / THEIR LIVES IN / THE GREAT WAR / 1914–1919." The remaining three sides bear the words "Courage," "Honour," and "Self-sacrifice." The memorial was unveiled on 5 August 1923 by the Rt Hon. Earl Beatty. A photograph of the plaque explaining the meaning of Goulden's composition is shown in the gallery below.
Great Malvern War Memorial	Great Malvern, Worcestershire	The memorial stands in front of the Great Malvern Public Library. It features a bronze depiction of a winged, semi‑nude male figure representing youth, with arms upstretched while holding a flaming torch. The figure gazes upward toward the torch. The bronze is mounted on a stone plinth that bears the inscriptions: "To those who/nobly served,1914–1919/1939–1945" and "Their life they/gave the light/of life to save" The memorial was unveiled in 1923.
Gateshead War Memorial	Gateshead, Tyne and Wear	The Gateshead war memorial, an imposing cenotaph on Prince Consort Road, features Goulden's art‑deco bronze relief of a semi‑nude warrior resting on his unsheathed sword, framed by two Ionic pilasters. Behind him is a cross "representing the one he gained as his reward for the greatest of all self‑sacrifices." Beneath the relief is a bronze door bearing Gateshead's coat of arms, leading to an interior chamber that once housed the book of remembrance, now kept in Gateshead Library for safety. A curved stone wall behind the structure bears inscriptions commemorating the dead of both World Wars. The memorial was funded by a public subscription launched in 1920, which raised £5,500, with notable contributions from 9,232 household donors and 20,000 schoolchildren. The inscription reads: "In memory of the people of Gateshead/Who made the supreme sacrifice/For their country/Mors Janua Vitae/In this chamber/are recorded the/ names of men of Gateshead/who gave their lives/In the Great War/1914-1919/Their name/liveth for/evermore" On the walls are the inscriptions: "1914–1919/To the Glory of God and to the immortal memory of the men of Gateshead who fell in the Great War this memorial is erected by their grateful fellow-townsmen." and "1939–1945/In memory of the people of/Gateshead who died in the/Second World War"

== Gallery ==
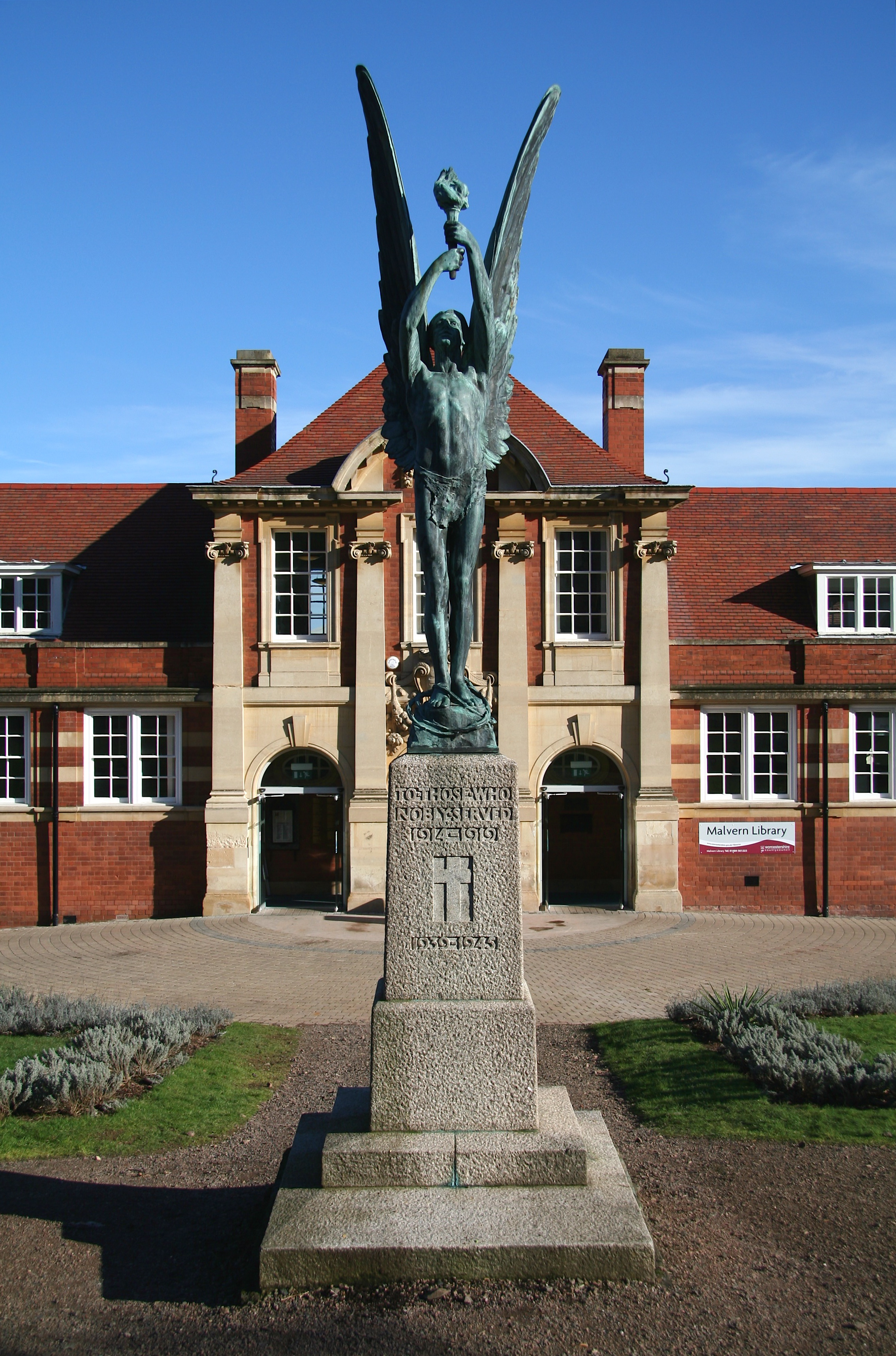
Great Malvern War Memorial. Photograph courtesy Andrew Kelsall.

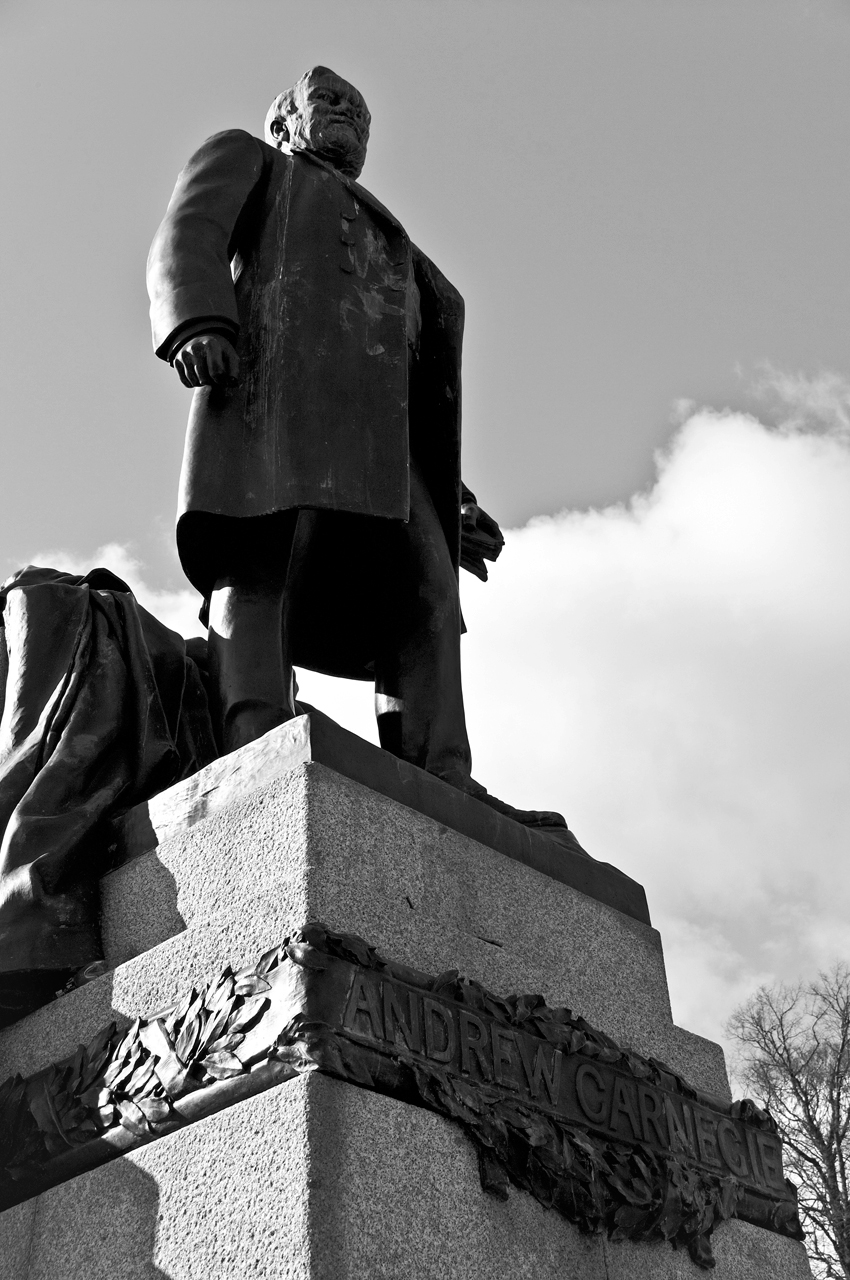
Statue of Andrew Carnegie. Photograph shown courtesy Ross Strachan.

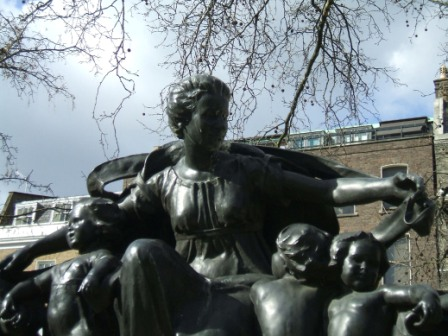
Part of Lincolns Inn Fields Memorial

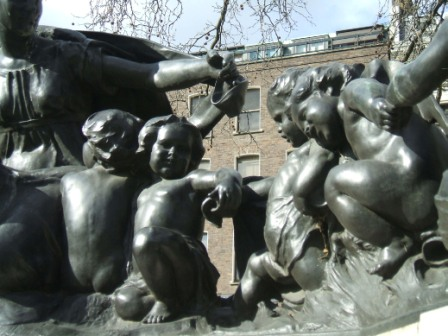
Part of Lincolns Inn Fields Memorial

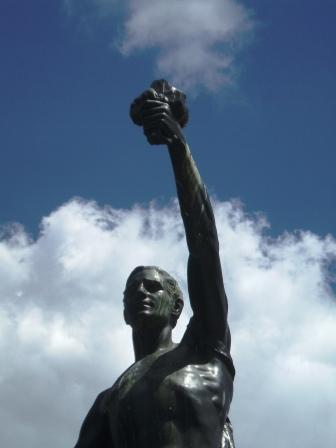
Figure on Kingston-upon-Thames War Memorial

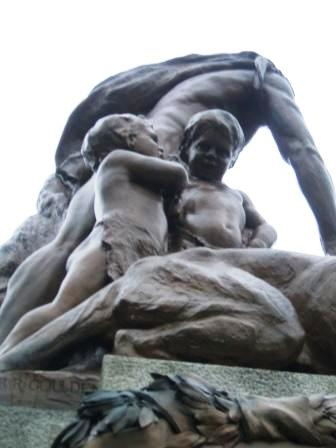
Crompton War Memorial

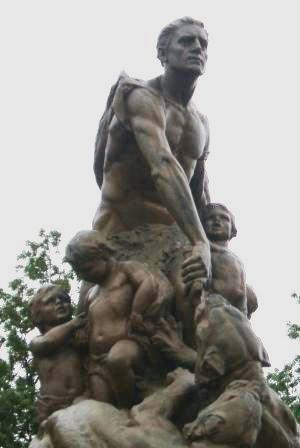
Crompton War Memorial

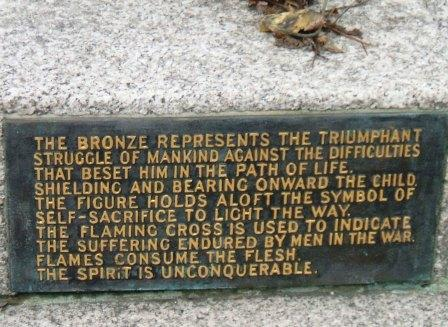
Plaque on Reigate and Redhill War Memorial

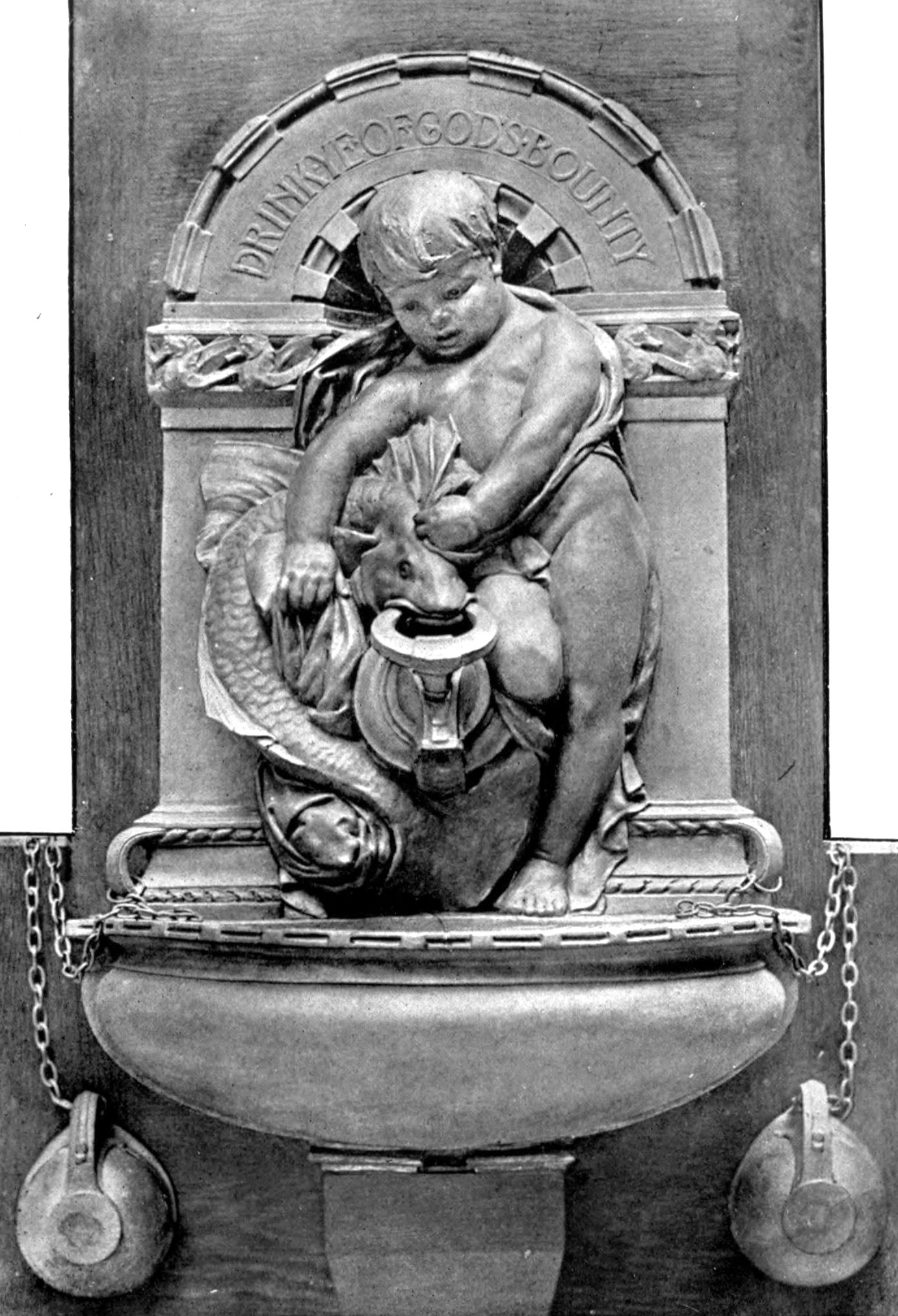
Fountain mural. From "Academy Architecture" 1904–1908.

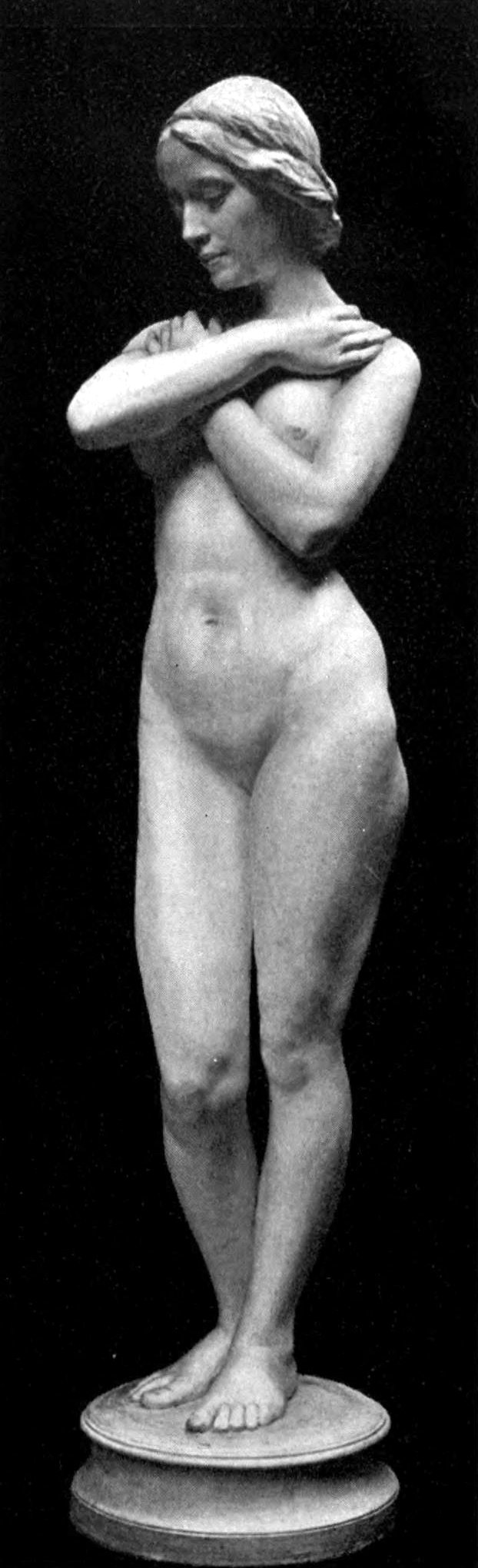
Phryne front. From "Academy Architecture" 1904–1908.

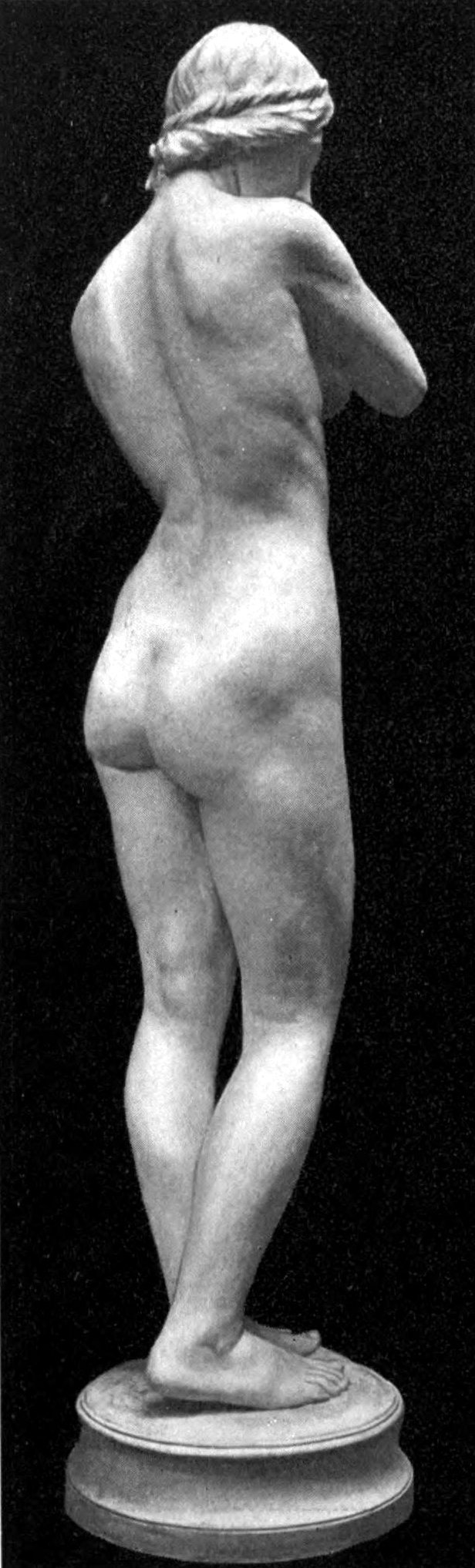
Phryne back. From "Academy Architecture" 1904–1908.

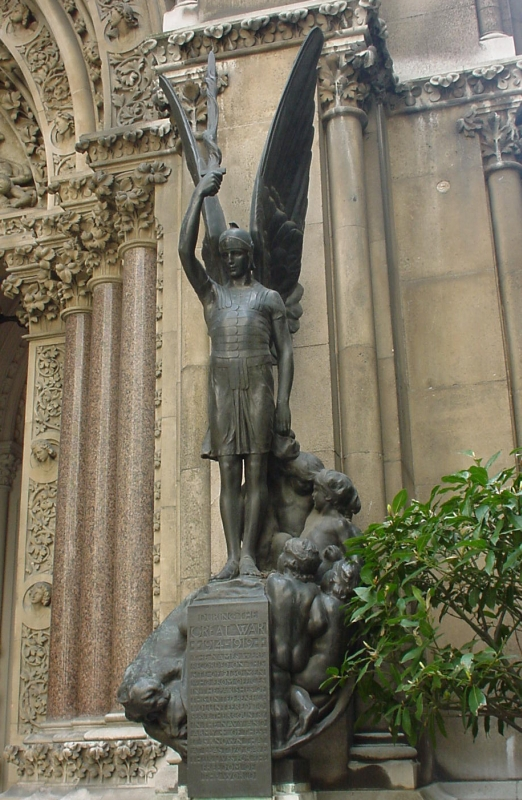
St Michael's in Cornhill. Shown courtesy Lonpicman.

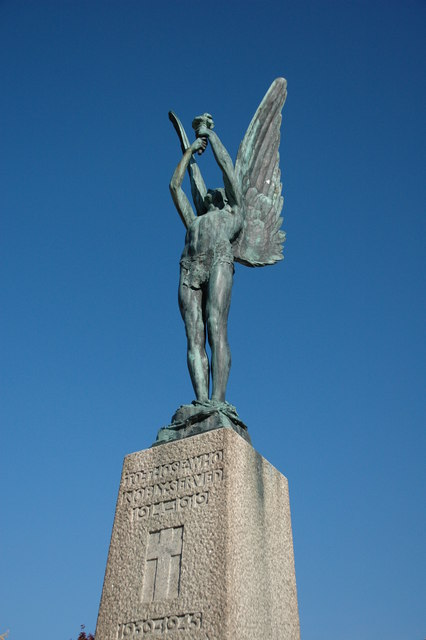
Great Malvern War Memorial. Shown courtesy Philip Halling.

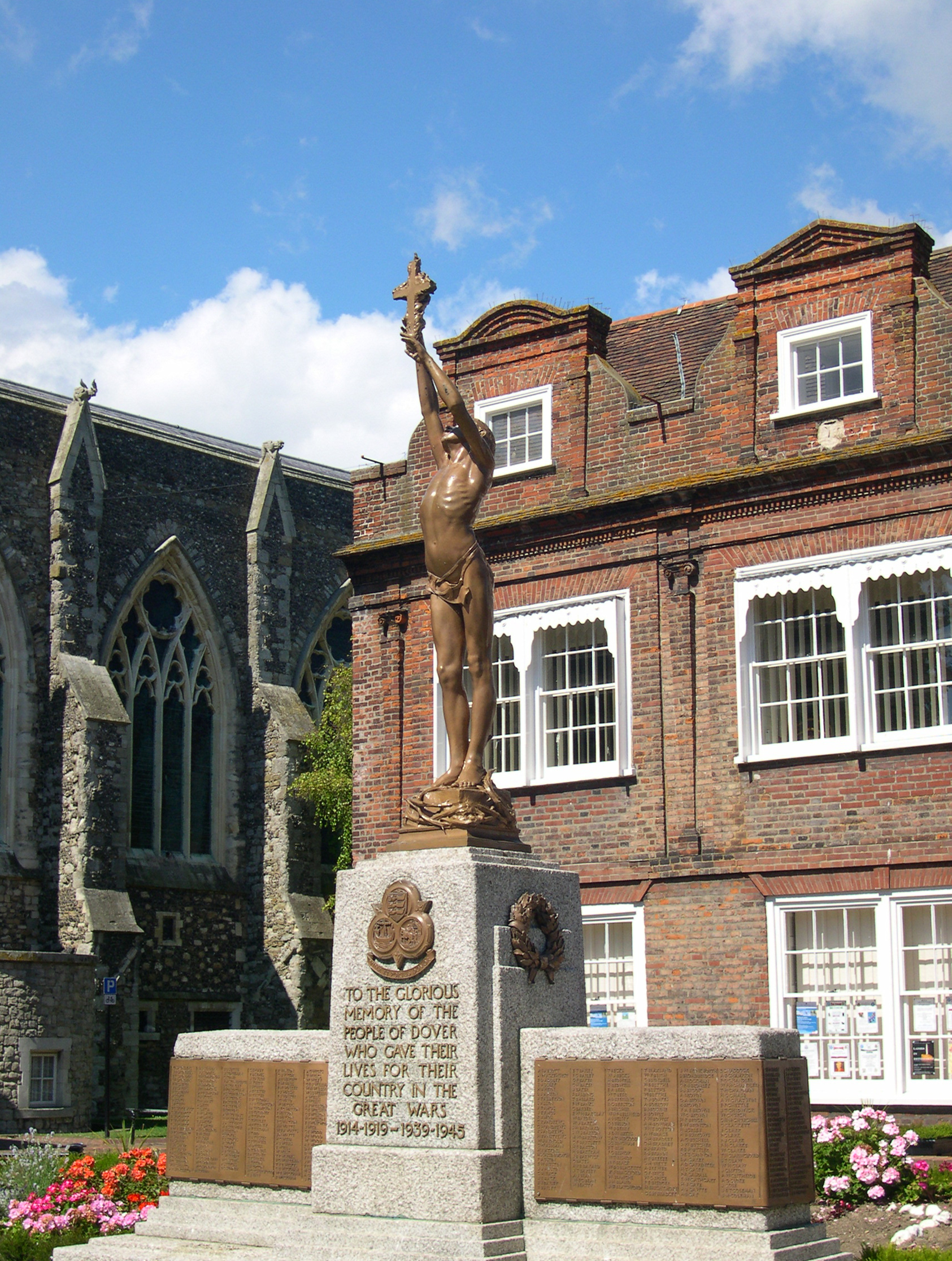
Dover War Memorial (1924) in public square in front of Dover Town Council building

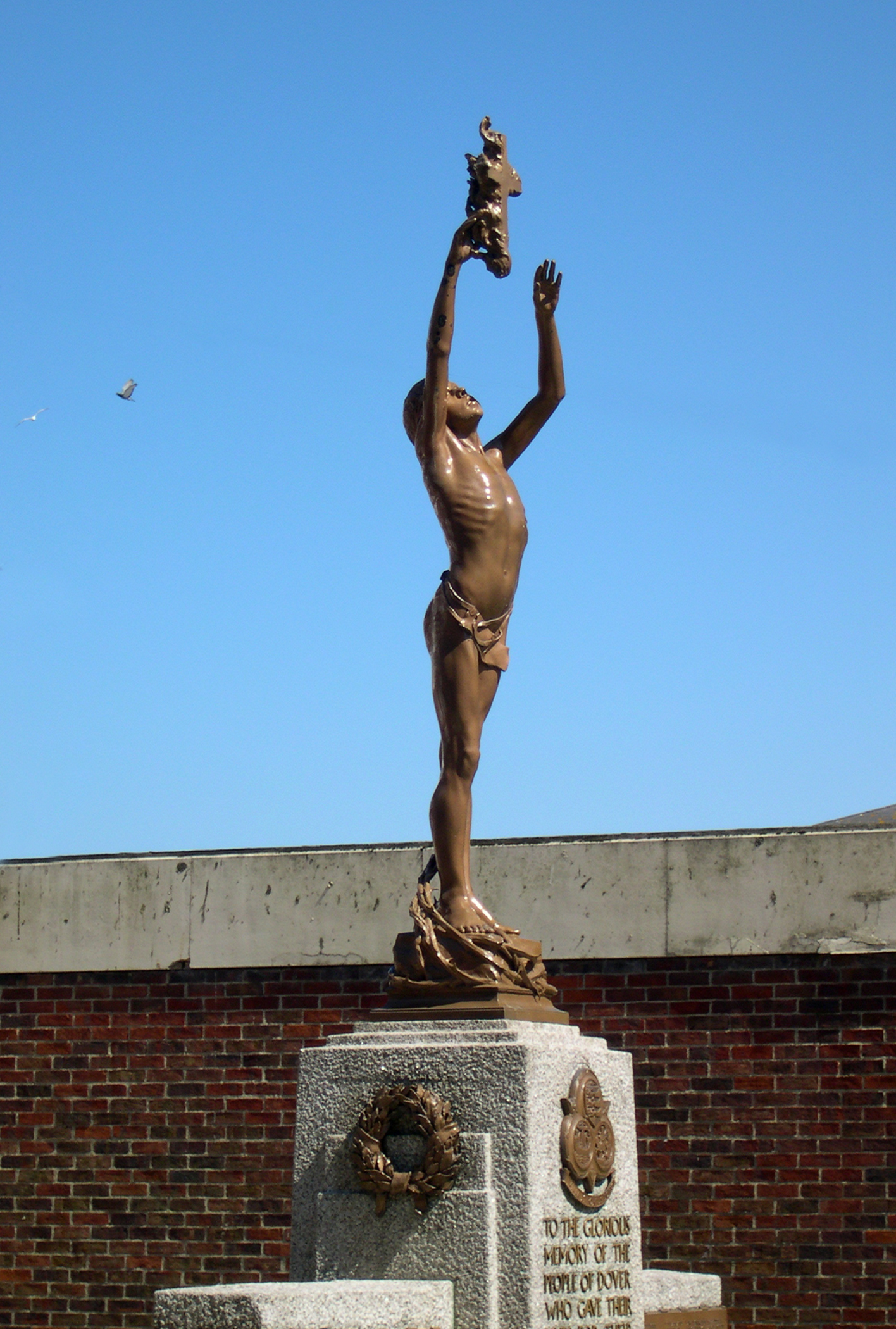
Dover War Memorial (1924), youth holding aloft a burning cross against a bright blue sky
