= John Snell (priest) =

John Snell (fl. 1430) was a Canon of Windsor from 1425 to 1431 and Archdeacon of London from 1422 to 1431.

== Career ==
He was appointed:

- Rector of St John the Baptist upon Walbrook 1416–1422
- King's Almoner 1421
- Prebendary of Wildland in St Paul's Cathedral 1426–1431

He was appointed to the fifth stall in St George's Chapel, Windsor Castle in 1426, a position he held until 1431.
