= Sir James Roll, 1st Baronet =

Lord mayor of London

Sir James Roll, 1st Baronet (9 December 1846 – 30 January 1927) was Lord Mayor of London for 1920–21.

== Life ==
Roll was born on 9 December 1846 at East Ruston, near Norwich, the youngest son of Nathaniel Roll and his wife Emma Roll née Gilding, who were tenant farmers in the village.

He was employed with the Pearl Assurance company, where he was first a district superintendent for the North, then a Director from 1882 and from 1892 Chairman of the company, a position which he held for over 20 years, retiring in 1916.

He was Master of the Worshipful Company of Glovers.

== Civic career ==
His municipal career in London began in February 1903, when he was elected a Common Councilman for Bridge Ward, in which at Adelaide Place, London Bridge, the Pearl Assurance company’s headquarters were then situated.

He was elected to the Shrievalty of the City in 1909-10. During the year the position of Alderman of Billingsgate Ward fell vacant, and Roll was elected after a contest with his co-Sheriff, Ralph Slazenger.

He became Lord Mayor in November 1920, serving until November 1921. During his year of office the Prince of Wales was entertained at Guildhall and gave an address before his visit to Australia and other Dominions overseas. Among important foreign dignitaries, he entertained the Crown Prince of Japan and King Albert and Queen Elisabeth of Belgium during their visits to the United Kingdom. Another important event during the year happened when Prince Henry, the King’s third son, took up the Freedom of the City by patrimony during the summer.

At the close of his year of office, the Lord Mayor received the customary baronetcy in November 1921.

== Arms ==
Coat of arms of Sir James Roll, 1st Baronet

Crest
A dexter cubit arm vested Or charged with two bars wavy Azure cuffed Ermine and holding in the hand a chaplet of laurel Proper.
Escutcheon
Or on a fess indented between four billets three in chief and one in base Azure each charged with a lion rampant a civic wreath of the field between two bezants.
Motto
Not For King Or Country But For Both

== See also ==
- Roll baronets
