= Robert Tyrwhit =

Robert Tyrwhit D.D. (1698 – 15 June 1742) was a Canon of Windsor from 1730 to 1742 and Archdeacon of London from 1731 to 1742.

== Family ==
He was born in 1698 in Cammeringham, Lincolnshire. He married Elizabeth, daughter of Bishop Edmund Gibson of London.

== Career ==
He was educated at Magdalene College, Cambridge, where he graduated BA in 1719, MA in 1722 and DD in 1728.

He was appointed:

- Rector of Welton, Louth 1722
- Chaplain to the King 1727 - 1742
- Rector of All-Hallows-the-Great, London 1727 - 1737
- Vicar of Kensington 1728 - 1731
- Minister of St James's Church, Piccadilly 1729 - 1733
- Archdeacon of London 1731 - 1742
- Prebendary of Kentish Town in St Paul’s Cathedral 1732

He was appointed to the eighth stall in St George's Chapel, Windsor Castle in 1730, and held the stall until 1742.
