= Richard Kilvington =

Richard Kilvington (c. 1302-1361) was an English scholastic theologian and philosopher at the University of Oxford. His surviving works are lecture notes from the 1320s and 1330s. He was a Fellow of Oriel College, Oxford. He was involved in a controversy over the nature of the infinite, with Richard FitzRalph, of Balliol College.

In the 1340s he worked for Richard of Bury, bishop of Durham.
