= Archdeacon of London =

Senior ecclesiastical officer in the Church of England

The Archdeacon of London is a senior ecclesiastical officer in the Church of England. They are responsible for the eastern Archdeaconry (the Archdeaconry of London) of the Two Cities (London and Westminster) in the Diocese of London, an area without area bishop and, rather, overseen by the diocesan Bishop of London. The immediate western counterpart in this area is the Archdeacon(ry) of Charing Cross.

Since 1989, the churches of this supervisory cleric are the numerous remaining churches of the City of London. Those of the Archdeacon of Charing Cross are the relatively few churches, but much more heavily populated zone that is the City of Westminster.

== History ==
Before the 20th century, the early medieval-founded London archdeaconry included parts of the East End as well as the City of London. The extent of the archdeaconry was reduced in 1912 (with the creation of the Archdeaconry of Hampstead) and in 1951 (with the creation of the Archdeaconry of Hackney) then latest boundary changes with the creation of the Archdeaconry of Charing Cross in 1989 saw the archdeaconry become coterminous with the limits of the City of London.

=== Archdeacons of Charing Cross ===
This archdeaconry, comprising the City of Westminster, was created shortly before Klyberg's appointment in June 1989. The archdeacon serves directly under the Bishop of London, who takes direct responsibility for the Two Cities area since there is no area bishop.

On 16 June 2015, it was announced that from 1 January 2016 the Archdeacon of London would take responsibility for the whole Two Cities area; a part-time Associate Archdeacon would also work across both. Lain-Priestley was thus collated to the Charing Cross archdeaconry, and became known as the Archdeacon for the Two Cities. Lain-Priestley resigned this on 31 December 2018 to become an Adviser to the Bishop of London.

As Archdeacon of Charing Cross since 2020, Atkinson was archdeacon full-time; in June 2023 it was announced that Atkinson was to become Bishop of Bradwell (an area bishop in the Diocese of Chelmsford) from "autumn" 2023. On 8 January 2024, it was announced that Katherine Hedderly was to become Archdeacon of Charing Cross "after Easter"; she was duly collated 15 April 2024.

== List of archdeacons ==
=== High Medieval ===
- ?–bef. 1096 (d.): Edward
- bef. 1102–aft. 1114: Reinger (Note: Reigner is not recorded with the title Archdeacon of London; rather the nature of his post can be deduced.)
- bef. 1127–aft. 1152: William de Beaumis (son of Richard de Beaumis)
- bef. 1154–aft. 1157 (res.): Hugh de Mareni
- bef. 1162–aft. 1189: Nicholas
- bef. 1192–aft. 1194: Peter de Waltham
- bef. 1196–bef. 1199 (res.): Alard de Burnham
- bef. 1202–bef. 1212 (d.): Peter of Blois
- bef. 1213–bef. 1214: Walter
- bef. 1214–aft. 1215: Gilbert de Plesseto
- bef. 1217–aft. 1223: William of Sainte-Mère-Eglise
- bef. 1225–bef. 1231 (res.): Geoffrey de Lucy
- bef. 1229–aft. 1234: William de Rising
- bef. 1235–aft. 1261 (res.): Peter de Newport
- bef. 1263–aft. 1268 (res.): John Chishull
- bef. 1272–aft. 1275: William Passemer
- bef. 1278–aft. 1280: Geoffrey de Mortuo Mari
- bef. 1281–1282 (res.): Richard Swinefield
- bef. 1285–aft. 1290: Robert de Ros
- bef. 1294–aft. 1299: Richard de Gravesend

=== Late Medieval ===
- bef. 1302–bef. 1308 (d.): John de Bedford
- ?–bef. 1305 (res.): John de Sancto Claro
- Peter de Dene (disputed with Bedford)
- 1308–bef. 1320 (d.): Bego de Cavomonte
- bef. 1309–bef. 1311 (d.): Reginald de Sancto Albano
- 1320–bef. 1323 (res.): Hélie de Talleyrand-Périgord
- bef. 1321–bef. 1324: Richard de Aston
- bef. 1323–bef. 1332 (d.): Pontius de Podio Barzaco
- 1332–aft. 1337: Itherius de Concoreto
- 13 September 1338–?: Edmund Howard
- 21 March 1339 – 1347 (res.): John of Thoresby
- bef. 1350–1354 (res.): Richard Kilvington
- 1354–?: Peter Cardinal du Cros (also Cardinal-priest of Santi Silvestro e Martino)
- 1354–9 February 1356 (exch.): James de Beaufort
- 9 February 1356 – 1361 (res.): John Barnet
- 15 October–October 1361 (d.): Fortanerius Vassalli (also Patriarch of Grado)
- 26 March 1362–aft. 1372: Adam de Hertington
- bef. 1383–bef. 1397 (d.): Thomas Baketon
- 10 February 1397 – 1400 (res.): Thomas Stowe
- 12 November 1400 – 1422 (res.): Reginald Kentwood
- 16 March 1422–bef. 1431 (res.): John Snell
- 28 January 1431 – 23 February 1443 (exch.): Richard Moresby
- 23 February 1443–bef. 1466 (d.): William Fallan
- bef. 1469–1482 (res.): Richard Martyn (also Archdeacon of Hereford from bef. 1478 and Archdeacon of Berkshire from 1478; became Bishop of St David's)
- 22 June 1482–bef. 1490 (res.): John de Gigliis
- 16 November 1490–bef. 1502 (res.): John Forster
- 3 September 1502–aft. 1510: Pedro de Ayala

- bef. 1510–bef. 1514 (res.): William Horsey
- 28 March 1514–bef. 1526 (d.): John Young, suffragan bishop (also Dean of Chichester from 1521)
- 29 March 1526–bef. 1529 (d.): Geoffrey Wharton
- 30 October 1529–bef. 1533 (exch.): William Clyff
- 5 August 1533–bef. 1534 (res.): Thomas Bedyll
- 19 December 1534–July 1543 (d.): Richard Gwent

=== Early modern ===
- 23 July–October 1543 (res.): Edward Moylle
- 29 October 1543 – 1554 (res.): John Wymmesley
- 27 April 1554 – 23 October 1559 (deprived): John Harpsfield (deprived; also Dean of Norwich from 1558)
- 1559–bef. 1591 (d.): John Mullins
- 1 June 1591–bef. 1626 (d.): Theophilus Aylmer (son of John Aylmer)
- 23 February 1626 – 19 September 1662 (d.): Thomas Paske
- 11 October 1662–bef. 1664 (res.): John Dolben
- 27 May 1664 – 1676 (res.): Thomas Lamplugh (also Dean of Rochester from 1673)
- 27 April 1677 – 1689 (res.): Edward Stillingfleet
- 1689–1691 (res.): Thomas Tenison
- 1692–9 October 1731 (d.): William Stanley
- 23 October 1731 – 15 June 1742 (d.): Robert Tyrwhit
- 12 July 1742 – 22 April 1764 (d.): Edward Cobden
- 24 April 1764 – 5 September 1770 (d.): John Jortin
- 29 September 1770 – 1775 (res.): Anthony Hamilton
- 22 February 1775 – 1789 (res.): Richard Beadon
- 1789–bef. 1813 (res.): William Bingham
- 31 December 1813–bef. 1842 (res.): Joseph Pott
- 4 November 1842 – 27 November 1870 (d.): William Hale

=== Late modern ===
- March 1871 – 11 August 1884 (d.): Piers Claughton
- 1884 – 1889 (ret.): Edwin Gifford
- 1889 – 1911 (res.): William Sinclair
- 1911 – 1930 (ret.): Ernest Holmes
- 1930 – 1947 (ret.): Ernest Sharpe
- 1947 – 1961 (res.): Oswin Gibbs-Smith (afterwards Dean of Winchester, 1961)
- 1962 – 1963 (res.): George Appleton
- 1963 – 1967 (res.): Martin Sullivan
- 1967 – 1978 (ret.): Sam Woodhouse (afterwards archdeacon emeritus)
- 1978 – 10 November 1986 (d.): Frank Harvey
- 1987 – 1999 (res.): George Cassidy
- 1999 – 2009 (ret.): Peter Delaney (afterwards archdeacon emeritus)
- 26 July 2009 – 31 July 2014 (ret.): David Meara (afterwards archdeacon emeritus)
- 11 September 2014 – 30 June 2015: Nick Mercer, Vicar General and acting archdeacon
- 1 July 2015 – 6 January 2016: Nick Mercer, Vicar General
- 1 January 2016 – present: Luke Miller (working across both archdeaconries)

=== Archdeacons of Charing Cross ===
- 1989 – 1996 (ret.): John Klyberg, Bishop suffragan of Fulham (became a Roman Catholic priest and prelate of honour)
- 1996 – 31 December 2014 (ret.): Bill Jacob
- 1 January 2016 – 31 December 2018 (res.): Rosemary Lain-Priestley, Associate Archdeacon / Archdeacon for the Two Cities (working across both archdeaconries)
- 2017 – 2019: Paul Thomas, Acting Archdeacon of Charing Cross
- 23 March 2020 – 29 September 2023: Adam Atkinson (became Bishop of Bradwell)
- 15 April 2024 – present: Katherine Hedderly

== Sources ==
- Greenway, Diana E. (1968), Fasti Ecclesiae Anglicanae 1066–1300, vol. 1, pp. 8–12
- Horn, Joyce M. (1963), Fasti Ecclesiae Anglicanae 1300–1541, vol. 5, pp. 7–9
- Horn, Joyce M. (1969), Fasti Ecclesiae Anglicanae 1541–1857, vol. 1, pp. 7–9
