= Roll baronets =

Extinct baronetcy in the Baronetage of the United Kingdom

The Roll Baronetcy, of The Chestnuts in Wanstead in the County of Essex, was a title in the Baronetage of the United Kingdom. It was created on 4 November 1921 for James Roll, Chairman of Pearl Assurance Co Ltd and Lord Mayor of London from 1920 to 1921. The title became extinct on the death of the fourth Baronet in 1998.

== Roll baronets, of The Chestnuts (1921) ==
- Sir James Roll, 1st Baronet (1846–1927)
- Sir Frederick James Roll, 2nd Baronet (1873–1933)
- Sir Cecil Ernest Roll, 3rd Baronet (1878–1938)
- Sir James William Cecil Roll, 4th Baronet (1912–1998)- educated at Chigwell School and Pembroke College, Oxford, he took no degree at the latter but was trained for holy orders at Chichester Theological College. Despite inheriting £3 million, he chose to minister to the poor, including in the East End in the aftermath of the Blitz during the Second World War.

== Arms ==
Coat of arms of Roll baronets

Crest
A dexter cubit arm vested Or charged with two bars wavy Azure cuffed Ermine and holding in the hand a chaplet of laurel Proper.
Escutcheon
Or on a fess indented between four billets three in chief and one in base Azure each charged with a lion rampant a civic wreath of the field between two bezants.
Motto
Not For King Or Country But For Both
