= Bill Jacob =

British Anglican priest

The Venerable Bill Jacob
- Other post: C of E Archdeacon of Charing Cross (1996-2014)

Orders
- Ordination: 1970 deacon, 1971 priest

Personal details
- Born: William Mungo Jacob; 15 November 1944
- Denomination: Anglicanism
- Education: University of Hull, Linacre College, Oxford, University of Exeter, St Stephen's House, Oxford

William Mungo Jacob (known as Bill) is a retired Anglican priest, who was Archdeacon of Charing Cross from 1996 to 2014.

== Early life ==
Jacob was born in 1944. He was educated at the University of Hull (LLB, 1996), Linacre College, Oxford (BA, 1969; MA, 1973) and the University of Exeter (PhD).

== Clerical career ==
Jacob trained for ordination at St Stephen's House, Oxford, and was ordained deacon in 1970 and priest in 1971.

He served his title at Wymondham Abbey (1970-1973), after which he was Assistant Chaplain to the Bishop of Exeter (1973-1975), on the staff of Wells Theological College (1975-1980), and Selection Secretary for the Advisory Council for the Church's Ministry (1980-1986). He was then Warden of Lincoln Theological College (1985-1996) and a Canon of Lincoln Cathedral (1986-1996). After the closure of Lincoln Theological College in 1995, he was collated as Archdeacon of Charing Cross in 1996, serving in that role until 2014. That period overlapped with being the Bishop of London’s Senior Chaplain (1996-2000) and Rector of St Giles in the Fields (2000-2015) and Priest-in-Charge of St Anne's Church, Soho (2011-2013). He retired in 2015, and has held a Permission to officiate in London and Norwich.

== Published works ==
Jacob is the author of Lay People and Religion in the Early Eighteenth Century (Cambridge University Press: 1996), The Clerical Profession in the Long Eighteenth Century, 1680-1840 (OUP: 2007) and Religious Vitality in Victorian London (OUP: 2021).

== Charitable activities ==
Jacob is a director of the Historic Chapels Trust, the Society of the Faith and the Paddington Development Trust. He is president (2021-2022) of the Chapels Society, an amenity society for Non-Conformist chapels.
