= Ernest Holmes (priest) =

British Anglican priest and author

Ernest Edward Holmes CVO (18 November 1854 – 22 February 1931) was an eminent Anglican priest and author.

Holmes was ordained in 1876. He began his career with a curacy in Rugeley after which he was Chaplain to the Lord Bishop of Cape Town and then the Lord Bishop of Oxford. Following this he was Vicar of Sonning from July 1901 and then Chaplain to Queen Alexandra. He was Archdeacon of London from 1911 to 1930.

== Notes ==
Church of England titles
Preceded by William Macdonald Sinclair	Archdeacon of London; 1911 – 1930	Succeeded by Ernest Newton Sharpe
