= Bank of England War Memorial =

War memorial in London

The Bank of England War Memorial, in the internal Garden Court at the headquarters of the Bank of England in the City of London, commemorates the bank's staff who were killed while serving in the First World War and Second World War. It includes a bronze sculpture by Richard Reginald Goulden portraying Saint Christopher carrying the Christ Child. It became a Grade II listed building in 2017. The surrounding buildings of the bank are separately listed at Grade I.

== Background ==
A memorial committee of long-serving bank staff was established in November 1918 to raise funds for a war memorial. Suggestions were made to spend the funds on a variety of different projects, such as a memorial chapel, a memorial library and hall, almshouses, the endowment of university scholarships, or a stained glass window at a nearby church. The committee decided on three memorials: a memorial service at Southwark Cathedral on 12 April 1919, endowing a bed at Guy's Hospital, and commissioning a memorial cross at the bank. These plans were approved by the bank's court of directors.

After initially donating £1,000 in June 1919 to fund a bed at Astley Cooper Ward, a surgical accident ward at Guy's Hospital, the bank continued to raise funds for the hospital from 1919 to 1944, providing over £30,000 to endow an entire ward of 26 beds, Christopher Ward. The bank's St Christopher Health Fund still continues to fund medical treatment for bank staff.

Successful fundraising allowed the committee to recommend a more ambitious memorial structure than the intended memorial cross. The committee approached Sir George Frampton, and he introduced them to Richard Reginald Goulden as a promising sculptor. Goulden was commissioned to design and make the memorial sculpture. Goulden's first design was approved by the committee but rejected by the bank's court of directors, but his second design, portraying St Christopher carrying the Holy Child, was accepted. The design reflected the location, as the bank's garden was the site of the church of St Christopher le Stocks until it was demolished in 1781, and Saint Christopher is the bank's patron saint; and it also reflects the spirit of service and self-sacrifice embodied by Saint Christopher. The materials for the sculpture cost £750, with a payment to Goulden of £105. A further fundraising gathered £300 to inscribe the names of the war dead at the base of the statue.

== Description ==
Goulden's lifesize bronze statue portrays a man standing on a rock, carrying a child on his shoulder. They man and child are holding hands, with the man wearing only a loincloth, and the child similarly naked. The group represents Saint Christopher at the edge of a stream, carrying the Christ Child. An inscription around the bottom of the rock reads: TO THE COMRADES / WHO, AT DUTY'S CALL, CROSSED THE DARK WATERS TO / THE FURTHER SHORE 1914–1919.

The sculpture is mounted on a large rectangular block of Portland stone as a plinth, on three stone steps. Set into the front of the plinth is a bronze cross, and the other three sides of the plinth each bear a bronze plaque listing the 71 names of the bank's war dead. The statue on its plinth stands around 10 ft (3.0 m) tall.

The sculpture was unveiled by the Governor of the Bank of England Montagu Norman in a prominent position in the Bank's garden, in an open internal courtyard, at a short ceremony at 4pm on 11 November 1921, at which it was dedicated by the Archdeacon of London Ernest Holmes, with two bandsmen from the Grenadier Guards playing the Last Post and Reveille.

A new committee was established in 1945 to commission elements to commemorate the war dead from the Second World War, again using funds raised from the staff donations. Rather than commissioning a new monument, modest elements were added to the existing memorial by Alexander Scott: set into the paving before the sculpture is a circular raised bronze plaque about 3 ft (0.91 m) in diameter, inscribed with a wreath around the words: TO THE / MEMORY / OF THOSE WHO / CROSSED THE / SAME WATERS / 1939–1945. The memorial was rededicated on 20 October 1948 at a ceremony attended by the Bank's Governor Thomas Catto, 1st Baron Catto, the Bishop of Stepney Robert Moberly, and by the former Governor Montagu Norman.

It is visible from the Bank's entrance hall, and the offices that surround it. The names of the bank's staff who served in the First World War are also inscribed in the entrance hall, with the dead marked with red crosses, opposite the names of the 65 war dead from the Second World War. Several of the bank's war dead are also commemorated by bronze plaques in other buildings that were Bank of England offices, in Manchester, Liverpool and Newcastle,

The memorial became a Grade II listed building in 2017.
