= Wardell-Yerburgh =

Wardell-Yerburgh may refer to

- Oswald Wardell-Yerburgh (1858–1913), a Church of England clergyman
- Hugh Wardell-Yerburgh (1938–1970), a British Olympic rower, grandson of Oswald
- Janet Wardell-Yerburgh, a British Olympic fencer, wife of Hugh
