= Oswin Gibbs-Smith =

British Dean

The Very Reverend Oswin Gibbs-Smith CBE
- Dean of Winchester
- Church: Church of England
- Diocese: Winchester
- In office: 1961 to 1969
- Predecessor: Norman Sykes
- Successor: Michael Stancliffe
- Other posts: Rector of Christ Church, Marylebone (1941–1948); Archdeacon of London (1947–1961)

Orders
- Ordination: 1924 (deacon); 1925 (priest)

Personal details
- Born: Oswin Harvard Gibbs-Smith; 15 November 1901
- Died: 26 September 1969 (aged 67)
- Denomination: Anglicanism
- Spouse: Nora (m. 1949)
- Children: Two
- Education: Westminster School
- Alma mater: King's College, Cambridge; Clare College, Cambridge; Cuddesdon College

Oswin Harvard Gibbs-Smith, CBE (15 November 1901 – 26 September 1969) was Dean of Winchester in the third quarter of the 20th century.

== Early life and education ==
Gibbs-Smith was born on 15 November 1901. He was educated at King's College School, Cambridge, and then Westminster School, a public school within the precincts of Westminster Abbey, London. He studied at King's College, Cambridge and at Clare College, Cambridge. He trained for Holy Orders at Cuddesdon College, an Anglo-Catholic theological college.

== Ordained ministry ==
Gibbs-Smith was ordained in the Church of England as a deacon in 1924 and as a priest in 1925. He then spent a short spell as an Assistant Master at Harrow School. He began his ecclesiastical career with a curacy at St Margaret's Church, Ilkley. Following this he was Vicar of John Keble Church, Mill Hill, and Rector of Christ Church, Marylebone, from 1941 to 1948. He was the Archdeacon of London and a Canon Residentiary of St Paul's Cathedral between 1947 and 1961. He served as Dean of Winchester from 1961 to 1969.

== Personal life ==
In 1949, Gibbs-Smith married Nora Gregg. Together they had two children: one son and one daughter.

== Honours ==
In 1953, Gibbs-Smith was made a Freeman of the City of London. In the 1961 Queen's Birthday Honours, he was appointed a Commander of the Order of the Bath (CBE).

Church of England titles
Preceded by Ernest Sharpe	Archdeacon of London; 1947–1961	Succeeded by George Appleton
Preceded by Norman Sykes	Dean of Winchester; 1961–1969	Succeeded by Michael Stancliffe
