= John Yelloly =

English physician

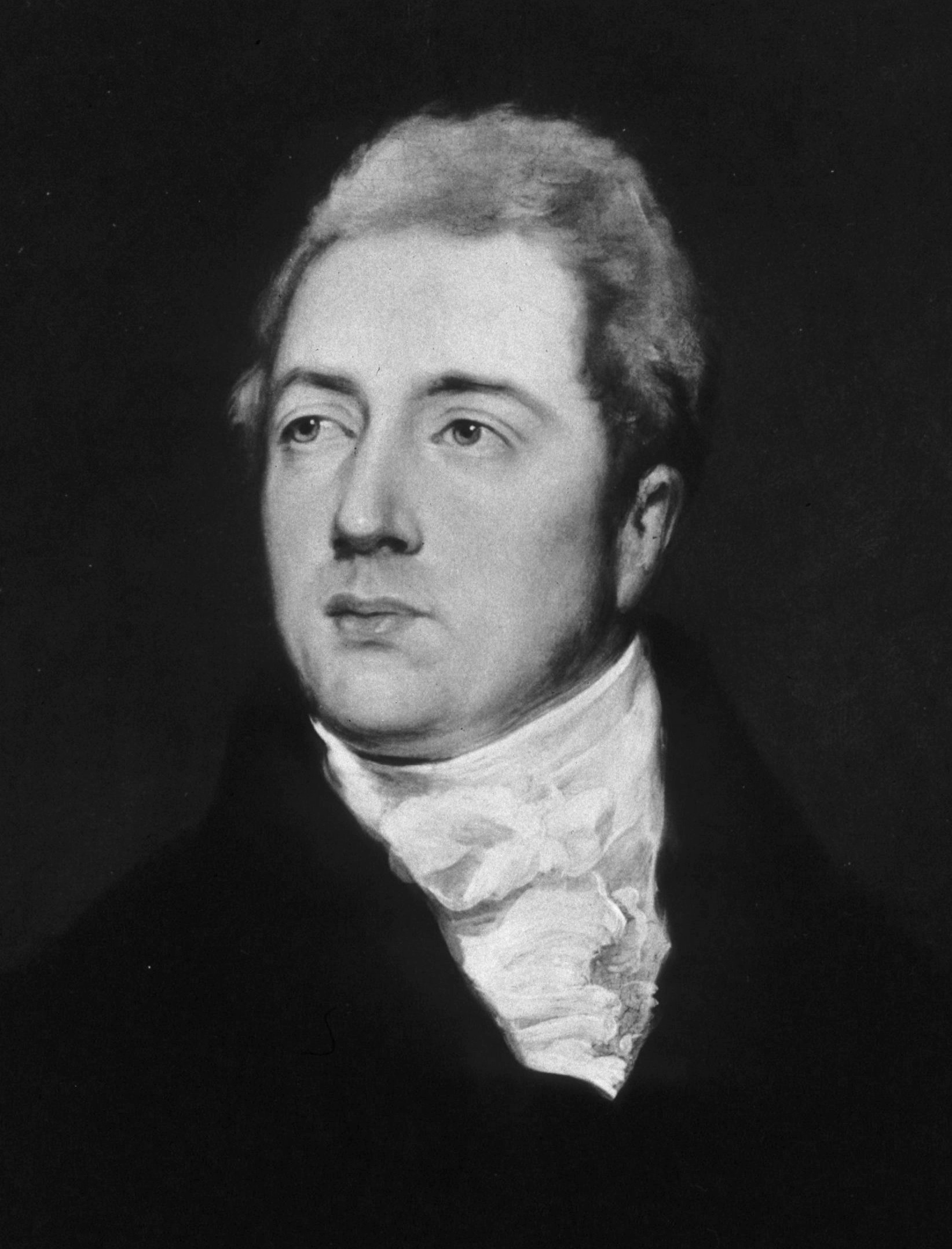
- Born: 30 April 1774; Alnwick, Northumberland
- Died: 31 January 1842 (aged 67)

John Yelloly (30 April 1774 – 31 January 1842) was an English physician.

== Life ==
Yelloly was born at Alnwick, Northumberland, and was the youngest and sole survivor of seven children. His father died when his youngest child was an infant, and Yelloly owed his home education to his mother Jane, sister of Nathaniel Davison, of the family of Davison of Whittingham. He was sent to the grammar school of Alnwick, and then to the university of Edinburgh, where he graduated M.D. in 1799. He settled in London in 1800, and in 1807 became physician to the London Hospital, an office which he retained till 1818.

Yelloly with Alexander John Gaspard Marcet founded the Royal Medical and Chirurgical Society in 1805, and he and Charles Aikin were the first secretaries of the society. The formation of the library was mainly due to his efforts. He was elected a Fellow of the Royal Society in 1814.

He went to live at Carrow Abbey, near Norwich, in 1818, and became physician in 1820 to the Norfolk and Norwich Hospital. He retired from practice, being wealthy, in 1832, and then resided at Woodton Hall, near Norwich. He was thrown onto his head from a phaeton in April 1840, and became in consequence paralysed on the right side. On 28 January 1842 this was followed by an apoplectic attack and paralysis of the left side, of which he died at Cavendish Hall, Suffolk, on 31 January 1842.

In 1806 he married the daughter of Samuel Tyssen of Narborough Hall, Norfolk, by whom he left children. He was elected a fellow of the Royal Society of Medicine.

== Works ==
Yelloly and published in the Philosophical Transactions for 1829 "Remarks on the Tendency to Calculous Diseases", a work based on the museum of stones extracted from the bladder in Norwich Hospital. He published a further work on the same subject in 1830, and a pamphlet On Arrangements connected with the Medical Relief of the Sick Poor in 1837. He read before the Royal Medical and Chirurgical Society seven papers, of which two deal with paralysis due to tumour of the brain.
