= Robert Walpole (classical scholar) =

English classical scholar (1781–1856)

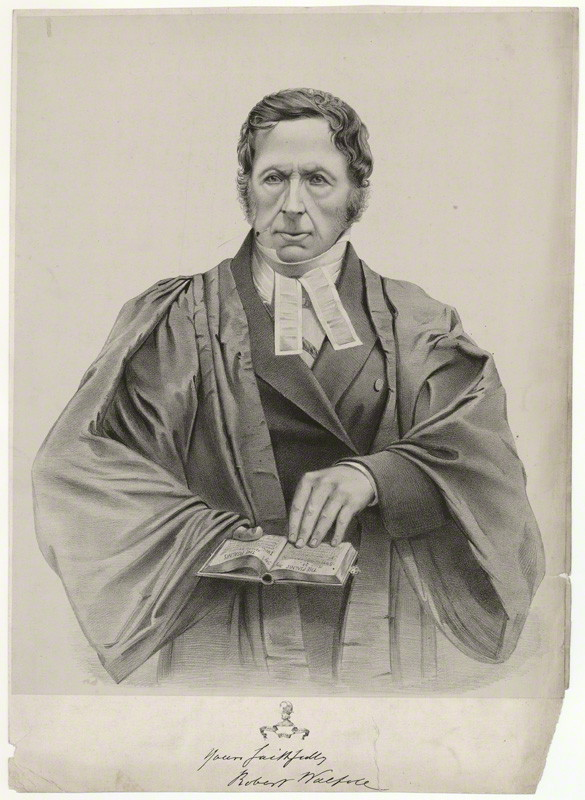
Robert Walpole

Robert Walpole (1781–1856) was an English classical scholar.

== Life ==
Born on 8 August 1781 in Lisbon, he was the eldest son of Robert Walpole, envoy to Portugal, by his first wife, Diana, daughter of Walter Grosset(t); Horatio Walpole, 1st Baron Walpole, was his grandfather. He was educated at Charterhouse School. He attended Trinity College, Cambridge from 1800, having first matriculated at Merton College, Oxford in 1797, and there he graduated B.A. in 1803, M.A. in 1809, and B.D. in 1828. He was admitted to Lincoln's Inn in 1803.

Soon after leaving Cambridge, Walpole travelled in Greece. On returning to Cambridge he presented a marble dramatic mask sculpture from the theatre at Stratonicea to the University Library.

Walpole was ordained deacon in 1808, and priest the following year. In 1809 he became rector of Itteringham, Norfolk, in 1815 rector of Tivetshall, Norfolk, and in 1828 rector of Christ Church, Marylebone, Westminster. He held Itteringham and Christ Church for the rest of his life. He died in Harewood Street, London, on 16 April 1856. He had estates at Carrow Abbey, near Norwich, and at Scole Lodge, Osmundeston, Norfolk.

== Works ==
In 1817 Walpole published Memoirs relating to European and Asiatic Turkey (2nd edit. 1818). He edited Travels in various Countries of the East (2 vols., 1820), consisting mainly of unpublished papers written by John Bacon Sawrey Morritt, John Sibthorp, and Philip Hunt. There were contributions from other travellers, including:

- William George Browne;
- George Hamilton-Gordon, in controversy with Desiré-Raoul Rochette over the Amyclaen inscription of Michel Fourmont;
- an Aegean travel journal of John Hawkins, and the Syrian journal of John Squire;
- on Knossos and the labyrinth by Charles Robert Cockerell; and
- on the Elgin Marbles by William Wilkins.

(Other authors were: Carlyle, Davison, Fazakerley, William Haygarth (1784–1825) the son of John Haygarth, Dr. Hume, Leake and Light.) These were completed by descriptions of antiquities and notes by Walpole himself. He was joint author with Sir William Drummond of Herculanensia, published in 1810.

Walpole wrote also:

- Melite Britannis subacta (1801) prize-winning Greek ode at Cambridge
- Comicorum Græcorum Fragmenta (1805), with some notes by Richard Porson
- Isabel, a collection of verse translations, which was criticised in the Edinburgh Review
- Specimens of scarce Translations of the seventeenth century from the Latin Poets (1805). This includes Walpole's Greek epitaph for the grave of John Tweddell in the Hephaestion. The Eclectic Review, also critical of the work, translated the epitaph.
- Essay on the Misrepresentations of certain Infidel Writers (1812)

He completed the sixth and final volume of Edward Daniel Clarke's Travels after the author's death.

== Family ==
On 6 February 1811 Walpole married Caroline Frances Hyde, the youngest daughter of John Hyde. They had two sons and two daughters, including the barrister Reginald Robert Walpole.

== Notes ==
Attribution

This article incorporates text from a publication now in the public domain: Lee, Sidney, ed. (1899). "Walpole, Robert (1781-1856)". Dictionary of National Biography. Vol. 59. London: Smith, Elder & Co.
