= George Saxby Penfold =

English cleric

George Saxby Penfold (1769 – 13 October 1846) was a Church of England clergyman, Rector of several parishes and active as a visiting preacher. In 1825 the University of Oxford awarded him the degree of Doctor of Divinity. A pluralist, for much of his life Penfold held the living of more than one benefice at once.

== Life ==
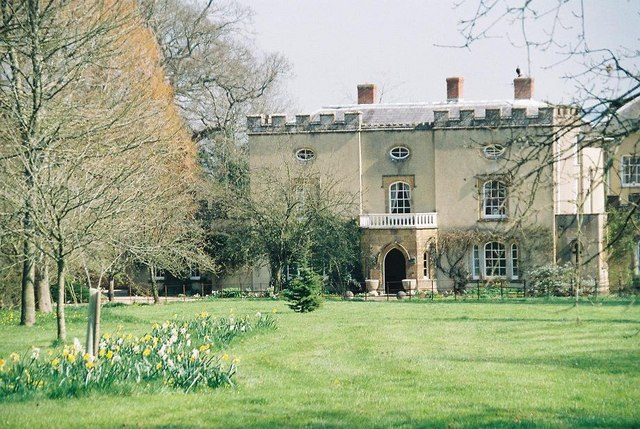
The Rectory at Pulham

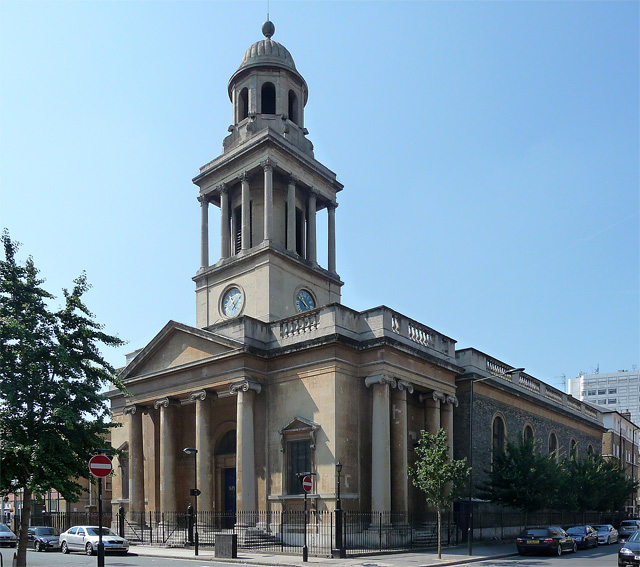
Christ Church, Marylebone

Baptised at Epsom, Surrey, on 27 November 1769, Penfold was the son of Hugh Penfold, gentleman, of Epsom, and his wife Susan, and was educated at Merton College, Oxford, where he matriculated on 13 June 1788, aged eighteen. He graduated BA in 1792 and proceeded to MA by seniority in 1814.

On 3 June 1792, Penfold was ordained as a deacon of the Church of England by James Cornwallis, bishop of Coventry and Lichfield, and on 29 May 1796 as a priest by John Douglas, bishop of Salisbury.

In February 1797, Penfold gained his first benefice, as Rector of Pulham, Dorset. In 1815, he was also appointed as Vicar of Goring-by-Sea, Sussex, and held both of these positions until 1832. By 1823, he was also Minister of the Brunswick Chapel, Marylebone, and was becoming popular as a visiting preacher. In May of that year, in its series of "Sketches of Popular Preachers", The European Magazine published an article on Penfold in which "Criticus" noted his strong and weak points as a speaker, including the assertions –

His sermons are marked by a decided inequality in merit; the language is sometimes very indifferent, the arrangement confused, and the conception commonplace... His sermons on the Sabbath display, in vivid colours, the mischiefs consequent on the neglect of this sacred and important institution... He never in any of his sermons rises to the highest scale of excellence, nor sinks to so low a point as to excite dissatisfaction or disgust; they are distinguished by a pleasing mediocrity.

On 27 July 1823, Penfold preached a sermon at the St Pancras New Church for the benefit of the Middlesex Hospital. A broadsheet advertising the sermon was issued.

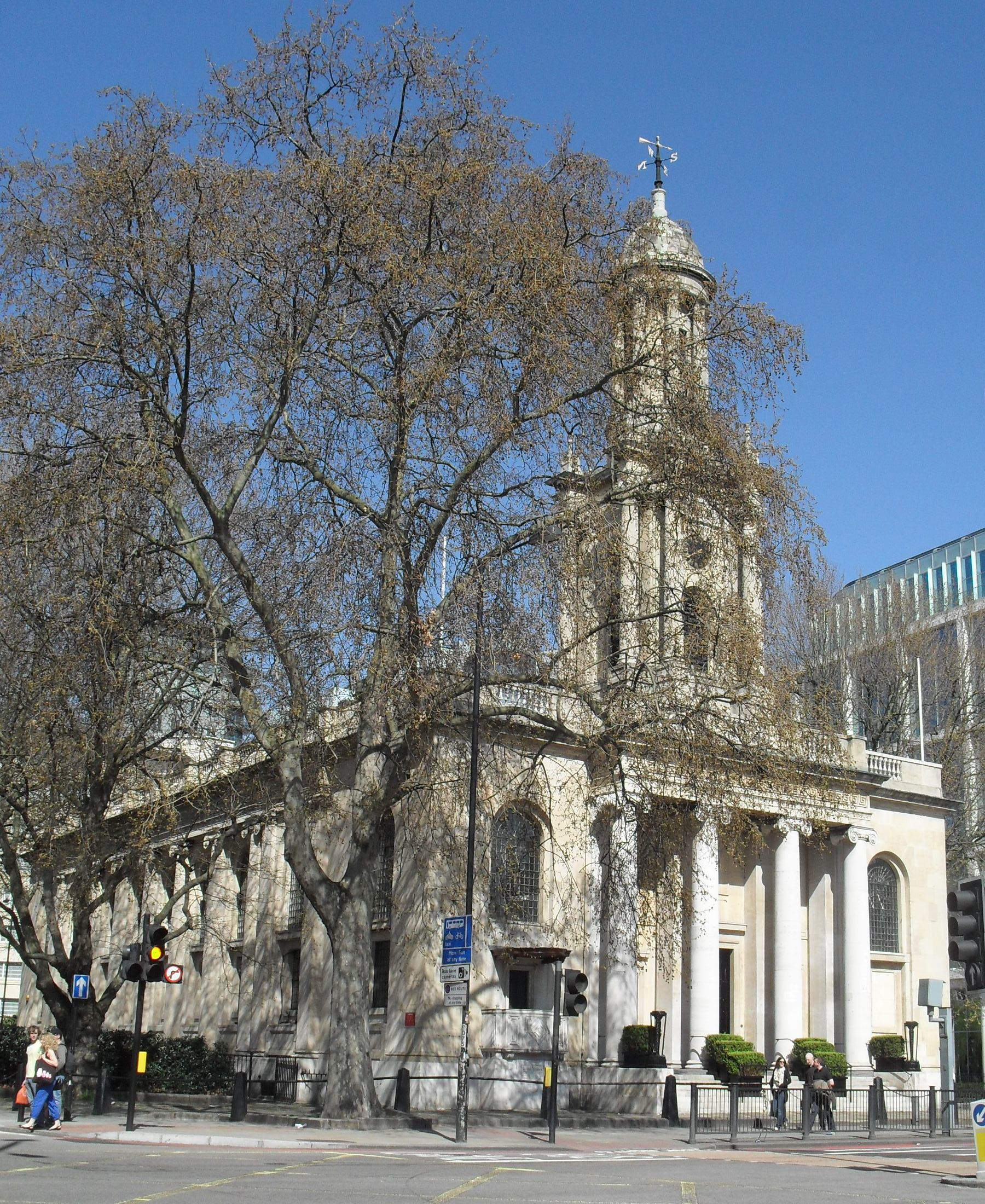
Holy Trinity, Marylebone

In 1825, Penfold was appointed as the first Rector of the newly built Christ Church, Marylebone. In December of the same year, the University of Oxford conferred on him the degrees of Bachelor and Doctor of Divinity.

In 1828, Penfold repeated the challenge of establishing a new parish when he was appointed as the first Rector of the newly built Trinity Church, Marylebone. In December 1831, he became Rector of Kingswinford, Staffordshire, and retained both livings until his death. However, during 1832 he resigned as Rector of Pulham and as Vicar of Goring. In August 1846, Penfold conducted his last funeral as Rector of Trinity, the next funeral in the church being his own in October. At the time of his death, he was living at 15, Dorset Square, Marylebone. He was laid to rest in the vault of his church in Marylebone.

== Private life ==
On 12 September 1792, at St James's Church, Piccadilly, George Saxby Penfold, then of Bray, near Maidenhead, married Sarah Fleming, of Westminster St James. A son called George Saxby Penfold died as an infant and was buried at Epsom on 9 September 1793. A Mr Hugh Penfold from Maidenhead had been buried there in November 1792.

In 1839, in the Old Bailey, a woman named Elizabeth Ballard was transported for life after cashing a forged cheque for £15 in Penfold's name.

At the census of June 1841, Penfold and his wife were living in Dorset Square with eight servants. In his will dated 22 May 1846, Penfold left "to my dear wife Sarah Penfold" £1,000, to be paid to her at once, together with the lease of his house in Dorset Square and all his household effects, carriages, and horses at his houses in Middlesex, Staffordshire, and Yorkshire. He left other bequests to friends and relations.

Penfold's widow died in December 1856 and was buried at Kensal Green Cemetery, although she had said in her will of 1853 that she wished to join her husband's remains in Trinity Church. In fact, no burials took place in the church vault after that of Sir Wathen Waller in 1853, which was the last. In her will, in the name of Sarah Saxby Penfold, and two codicils, she left most of her estate to a nephew, Captain Frederick Charles Parson, and expressed the wish that he would "take upon himself the surnames and arms of Saxby Penfold".
