= Holy Trinity Church, Marylebone =

Coordinates: 51°31′27″N 0°8′37″W

Former Holy Trinity Church, Marylebone
- One Marylebone
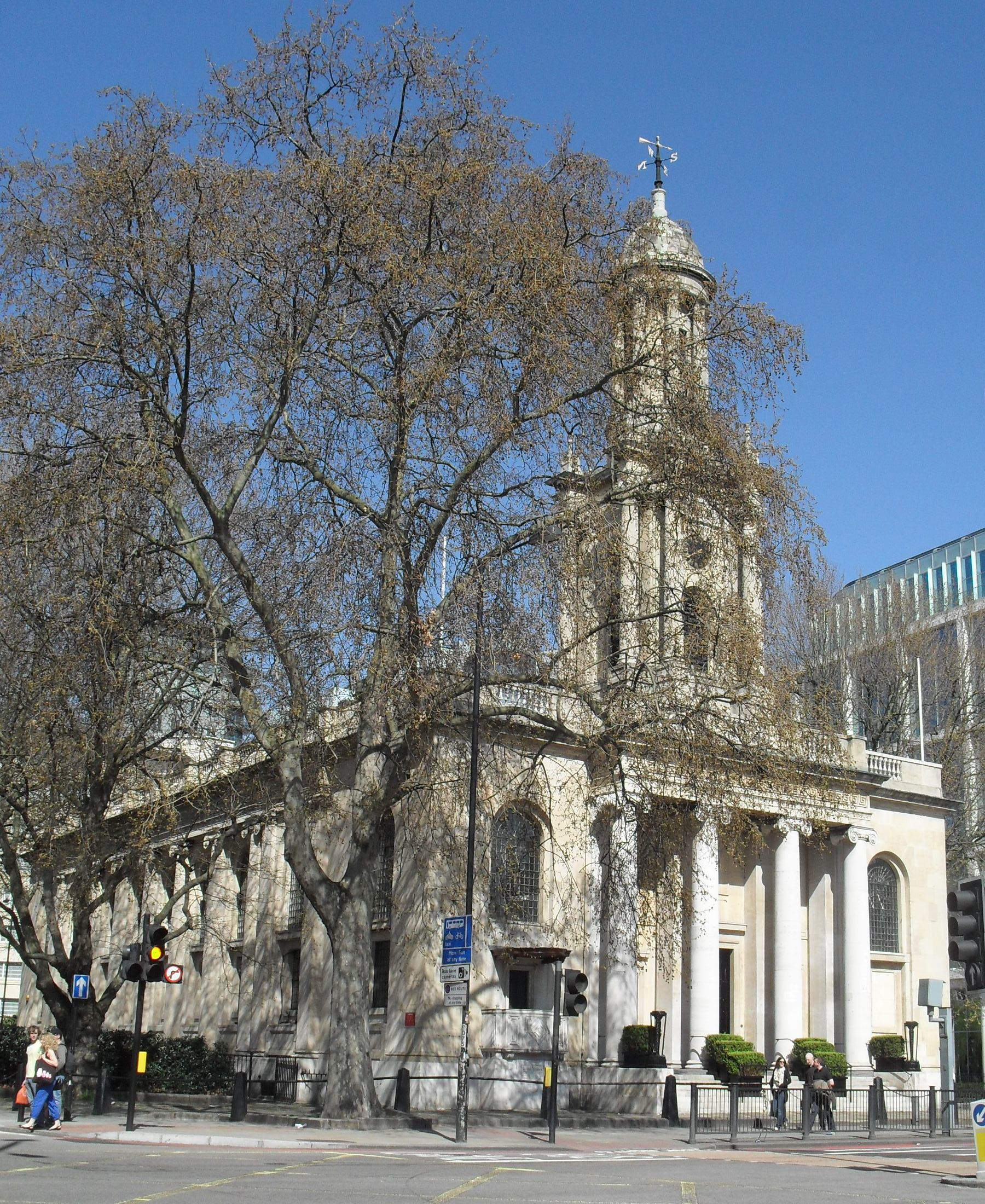
- Former Holy Trinity Church, Marylebone
- Location: 1 Marylebone Road, Marylebone, Westminster, London NW1 4AQ
- Country: England
- Denomination: Church of England

Architecture
- Architect: John Soane
- Years built: 1828

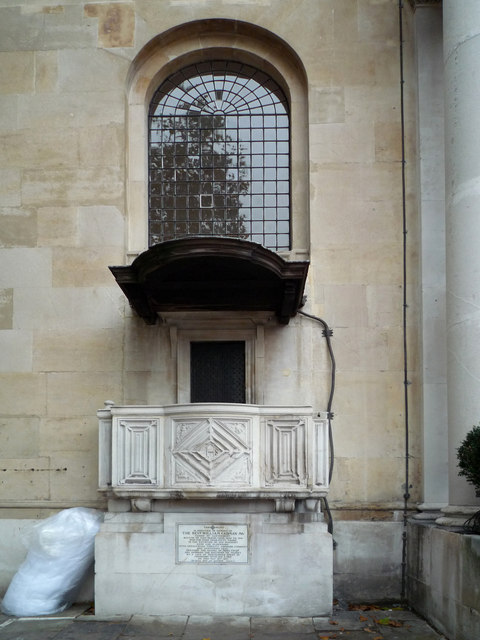
The open air pulpit is dedicated to William Cadman, rector from 1858 to 1891

Holy Trinity Church, in Marylebone, Westminster, is a Grade I listed former Anglican church, built in 1828 and designed by John Soane.

== History ==
In 1818 Parliament passed an act setting aside one million pounds to celebrate the defeat of Napoleon. This is one of the so-called "Waterloo churches" that were built with the money. The building has an entrance off-set with four large Ionic columns. There is a lantern steeple, similar to St Pancras New Church, which is also on Euston Road to the east.

George Saxby Penfold was appointed as the first Rector, having previously taken on much the same task as the first Rector of Christ Church, Marylebone. The first burial took place in the vault of the church in 1829, and the last was that of Sir Wathen Waller in 1853. It has an external pulpit facing onto Marylebone Road, erected in memory of the Revd. William Cadman MA (1815–1891), who was rector of the parish from 1859 - 1891, renowned for his sonorous voice and preaching. John Stuart Verschoyle was curate of the church from 1881 to 1891.

By the 1930s, the use of the church had declined, and from 1936 it was used as a book warehouse by the newly founded Penguin Books. A children's slide was used to deliver books from the street into the large crypt. In 1937 Penguin moved out to Harmondsworth, and the Society for Promoting Christian Knowledge (SPCK), an Anglican missionary organisation, moved in. It was their headquarters until 2006, when they relocated to Tufton Street, Westminster (they have since moved again to Pimlico). In 2018 the church became the location of the world's first wedding department store, The Wedding Gallery, based on the ground floor and basement level. The first floor is used as an events space operated by One Events and known as "One Marylebone".

The former church stands on a traffic island by itself, bounded by Marylebone Road at the front, and Albany Street and Osnaburgh Street on either side; the street at the rear north side is Osnaburgh Terrace.
