= Nathaniel Davison =

English diplomat and Egyptologist

- Born: c. 1736; Longhoughton, United Kingdom
- Died: 23 February 1809 (aged 72–73); Alnwick, United Kingdom
- Burial place: Longhoughton, United Kingdom
- Occupation: Diplomat
- Known for: Discovering the first relieving chamber of the Great Pyramid
- Spouse: Margaret Thornton (m. 1787)

Nathaniel Davison (c. 1736 – 23 February 1809) was an English diplomat, known for his writings on Egyptian archaeology. He discovered a space in the Great Pyramid, now known as "Davison's Chamber", or "first relieving chamber".

== Life ==
He was the fourth son of George Davison of Little Mill, Longhoughton, Northumberland; his sister Jane was mother of John Yelloly the physician. He was British consul at Nice, where he had consular privileges from September 1769, and then from 1778 in Algiers, leaving in 1783. He had been hoping for Naples, asking Thomas Percy for the influence of the Duke of Northumberland in support. He received a government pension in 1786.

Davison rented a house in Twickenham, where his son Nicholas Francis was born, from the merchant Daniel Twining, father of Thomas Twining. He died in Alnwick on 23 February 1809, aged 72 or 73, and was buried at Longhoughton. Sir Henry Taylor, brought up in County Durham where his father was a friend of Davison, recollected that he wore a pigtail (queue), one of the last men of his generation to do so. He sold the home farm Little Mill to Lord Grey.

== Travel writings ==
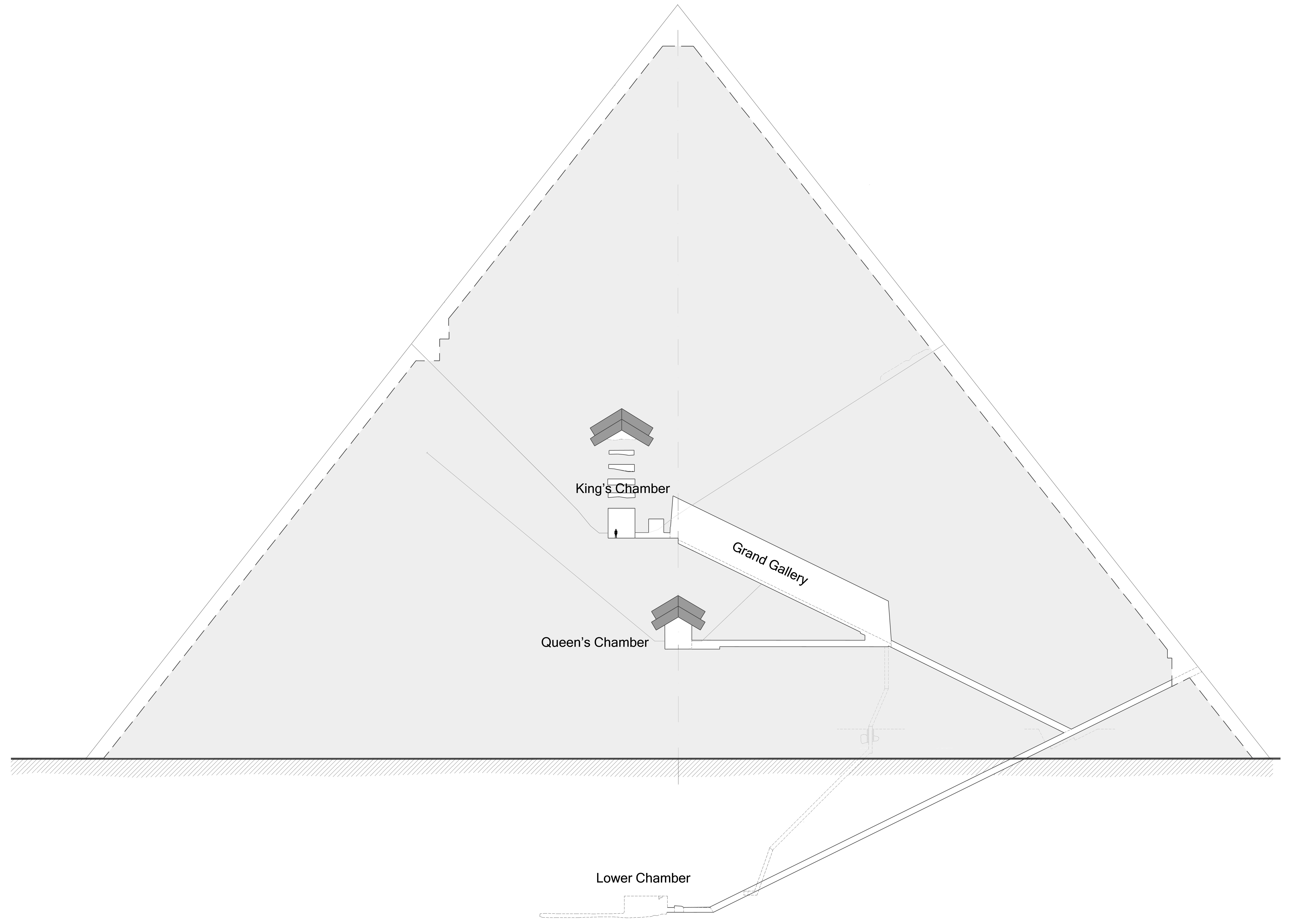
Davison's Chamber is the lowest of what are five "relieving chambers" above the King's Chamber in the Great Pyramid

In 1763 Davison travelled to Egypt with Wortley Montagu, whom he knew through the London bookseller Thomas Becket. Acting as Montagu's secretary, he documented their journeys for the Royal Society. Montagu and Davison set off from Livorno in April 1763, for Alexandria. Montague spent time in Rosetta in the spring of 1764. Davison himself spent 18 months at Alexandria, and then the same length of time at Cairo, and visited the pyramids.

It was in 1765 that, in the Great Pyramid, Davison followed up an echo he heard in the Grand Gallery. Through a passage deep with bat dung, he found, after a crawl of 24 feet, a space above the King's Chamber. He later conjectured about the architectural role of the chamber he discovered, in a letter to Joseph White of 1779, coming to conclusions comparable with those later published by Richard William Howard Vyse.

An engraving after a drawing by Davison of the interior of the Great Pyramid appeared in volume 2 (1807) Travels in Upper and Lower Egypt by Charles-Nicolas-Sigisbert Sonnini de Manoncourt. It was published via the intervention of Louis Joseph d'Albert d'Ailly, the Duc de Chaulnes; but Davison claimed the Duc had come by this and other drawings of his by underhand means.

Extracts from Davison's journals were published in 1817 by Robert Walpole, in his collection Memoirs Relating to European and Asiatic Turkey. They included descriptions of the chamber, and the vertical shaft in the Great Pyramid; and catacombs in Alexandria.

== Family ==
Davison married Margaret Thornton on 9 July 1787, in London. Their son Nicholas Francis became a physician. Their third daughter Margaret married Edward John Howman in 1822. The fourth daughter, Eleanor, married Adam Atkinson of Lorbottle.

Davison also helped to bring up his nephew John Yelloly, after his father died.
