= Christ Church, Marylebone =

Former Christ Church, Marylebone
- Greenhouse Centre
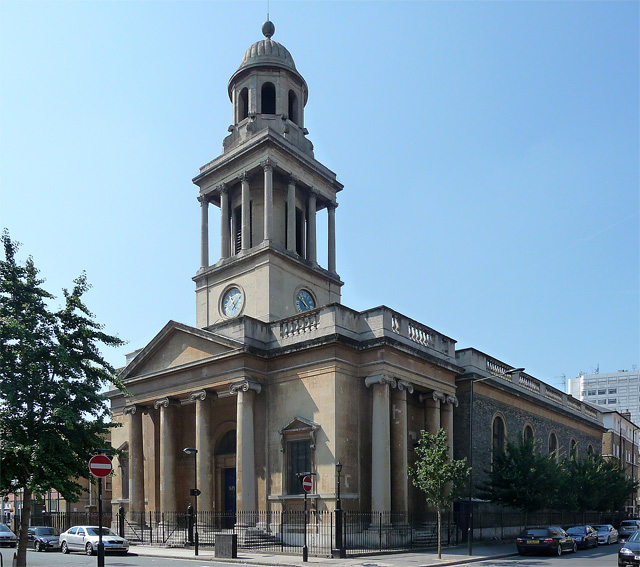
- Former Christ Church, Marylebone
- 51°31′18″N 0°9′59″W
- Location: 35 Cosway Street, Marylebone, Westminster
- Country: England
- Denomination: Church of England

History
- Status: closed
- Dedicated: 1825

Architecture
- Architect(s): Thomas Hardwick; Philip Hardwick
- Style: Neoclassical
- Years built: 1822–1824
- Closed: 1977

Clergy
- Rector: 1825–1828: George Saxby Penfold 1828–1856: Robert Walpole; 1856–1889: John Llewelyn Davies; 1891–1899: Oswald Wardell-Yerburgh; 1899–1907: Harry Alsager Sheringham; 1907–1923: George Mould; 1923–1941: Thomas G. B. Kay 1941–1948: Oswin Harvard Gibbs-Smith

Christ Church, Marylebone, also called Christ Church, Lisson Grove, and Christ Church, Cosway Street, is a Grade II* listed former Church of England church, built in the 1820s in Marylebone in the City of Westminster to designs by Thomas and Philip Hardwick.

After deconsecration in 1977, the church became an antiques market and restaurant and is now a sports centre named the Greenhouse Centre. It stands on a busy street mid-way between Paddington Station and Regent's Park.

== The church ==
Christ Church was one of the first of the Commissioners' churches, which were some six hundred new churches built between the 1820s and 1850s by the Church Building Commission, using £1,500,000 given by Parliament so that the growing populations of the suburbs could be better served by the Established Church.

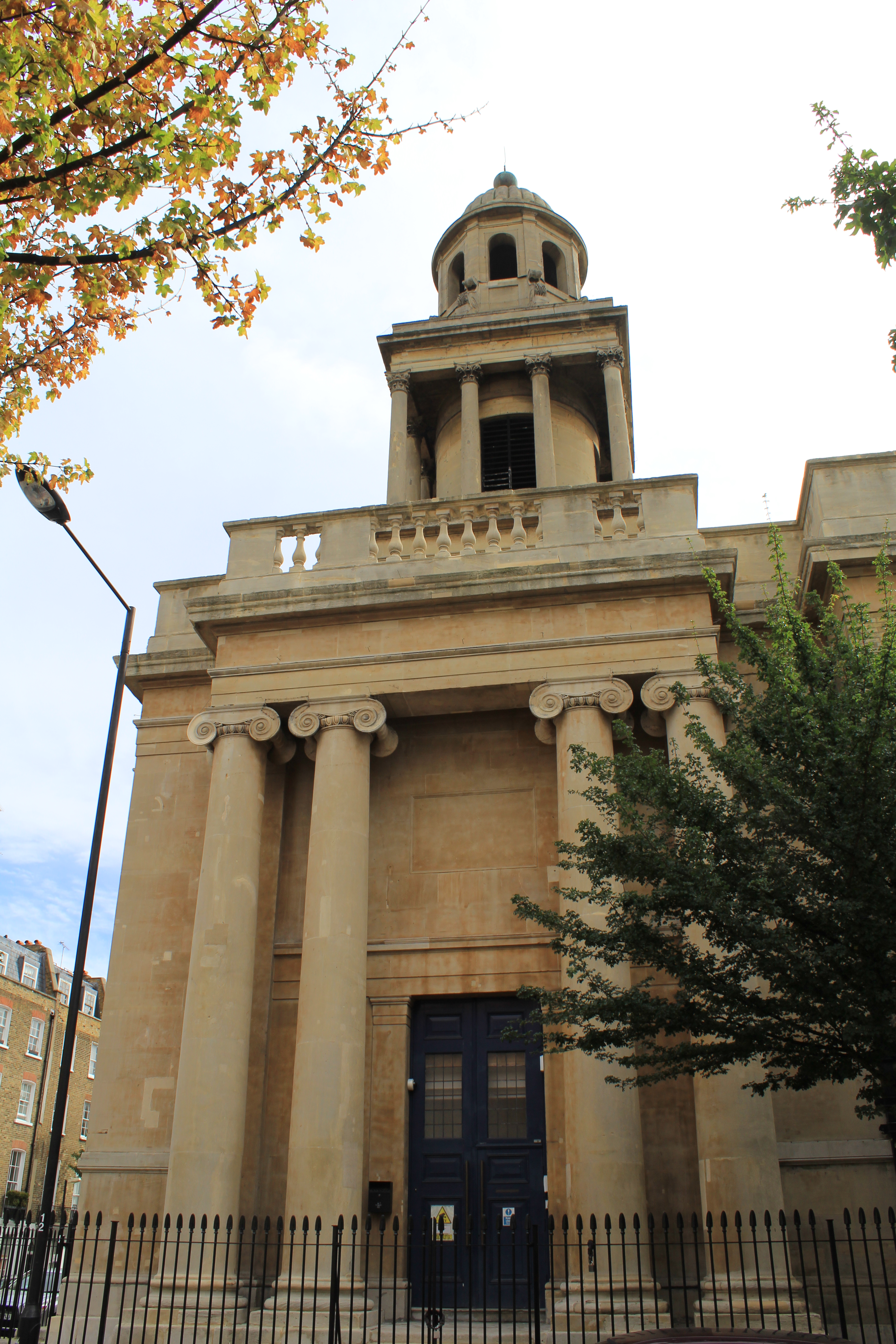
The north portico

The church is an example of square Georgian neoclassical architecture, covered in pale limestone, with the nave inside built of brick. It has a four-columned Ionic portico at the front, with a blank pediment, and further pairs of pillars on each side. A square tower rises above the church, with clock faces and Corinthian pillars, above which is an octagonal cupola with a roof shaped like a bell. Inside the church is an eight-bay Corinthian arcade, with Corinthian pilasters on the east wall. Clerestory windows sit above an entablature, and the nave has a low arched ceiling with ribs and oval panels. The church also has galleries.

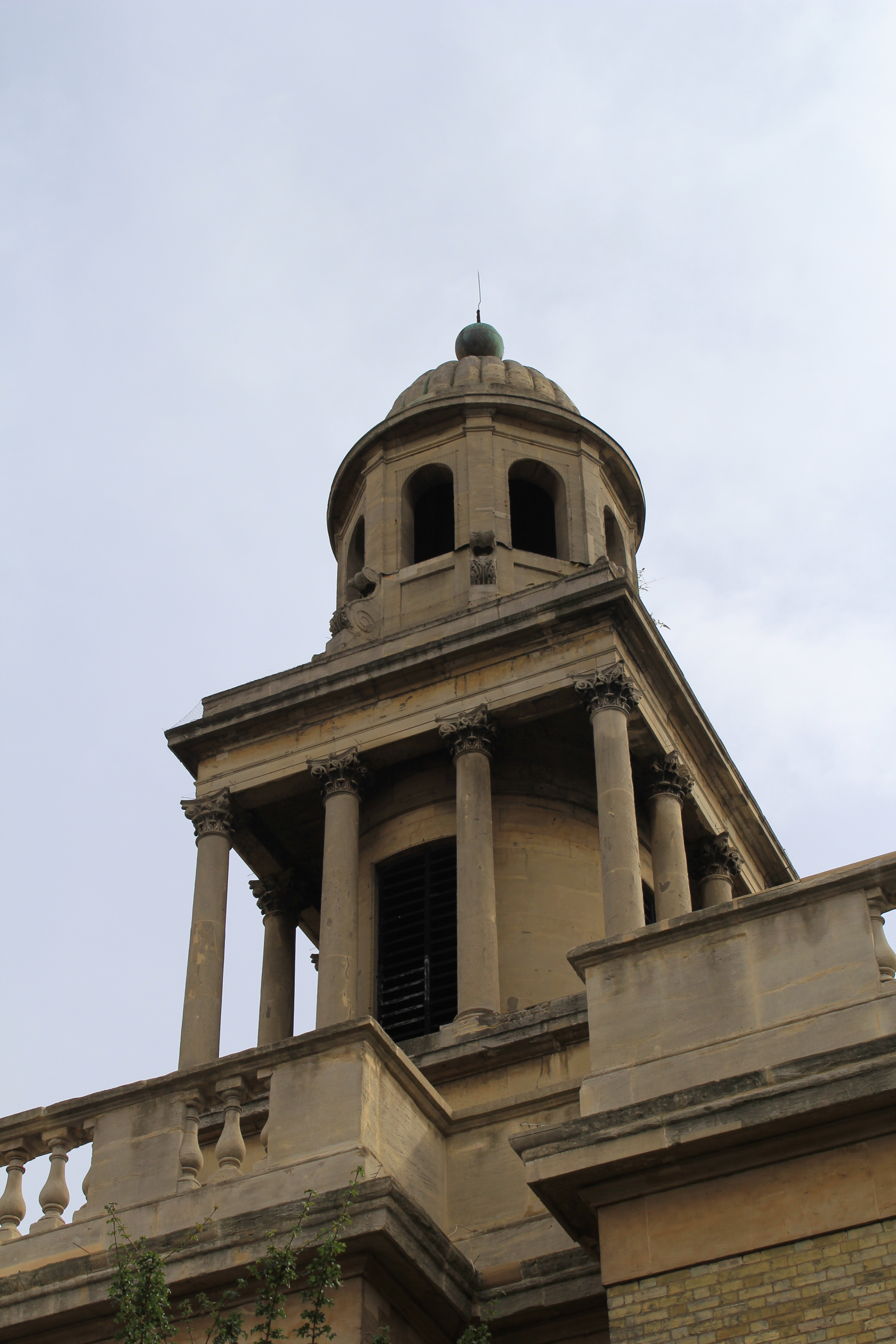
The tower and cupola

Lacking a graveyard, like many other metropolitan churches, Christ Church was provided with a large vault for its burials. In 1887, some alterations were made to the church, designed by Sir Arthur Blomfield.

Due to parish reorganization, the church was declared redundant and closed in 1977. The building was sold and converted by Umano architects in the 1980s, becoming first an antique market and restaurant.

In 2014, the church was bought by Greenhouse Sports, a youth charity, with the help of Michael Sherwood, a former banker. The Sport England Lottery, the London Marathon Charitable Trust, and the People's Postcode Lottery supported its refurbishment as a multi-sports centre. As part of the new use, the crypt was converted into changing rooms and meeting rooms. The new sports centre, named the Greenhouse Centre, was formally opened by Prince William, Duke of Cambridge, and Prince Harry on 30 April 2018.

== The parish ==
The parish of Christ Church, Cosway Street, was created in 1825 by Act of Parliament as one of four new district rectories within the ancient parish of St Marylebone. It was provided with a Rectory called Christ Church House.

George Saxby Penfold was appointed as the first Rector, but in 1828 moved on to serve as the first Rector of the newly built Holy Trinity, Marylebone. He was succeeded by a notable classical scholar, Robert Walpole.

In 1892, shortly after the arrival of Oswald Wardell-Yerburgh as Rector, a new Christ Church House was built in Shroton Street, in polychromatic brick, and provided parish rooms and a Boys’ Club in the basement. It was formally opened in December 1892 by the Duke of Fife.

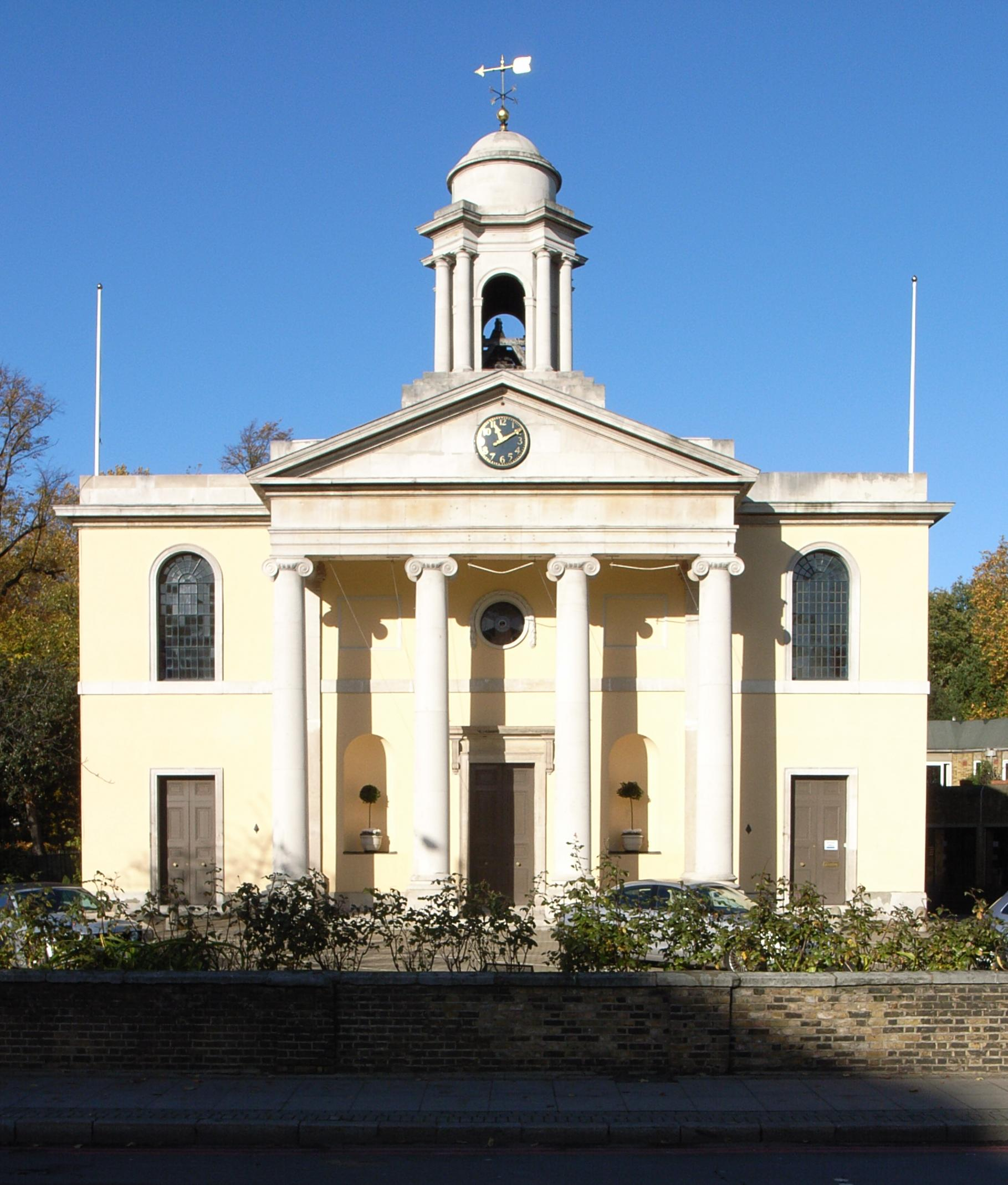
The St John's Wood Chapel

In 1898, the St John's Wood Chapel became a chapel of ease to Christ Church, Marylebone. In 1932, the Rector of Christ Church moved from Christ Church House into St John's House and increasingly the parish appears to have been administered from there.

Oswin Gibbs-Smith, who was appointed as Rector of Christ Church in 1941, was also in charge of the parishes of St Barnabas, Bell Street, and St Stephen, Avenue Road, with St Andrew, Allitsen Road. During the Second World War, by agreement with Gibbs-Smith, the Royal Air Force took over Christ Church School, in Cosway Street, Christ Church House, in Shroton Street, the De Walden Institute, in Charlbert Street, and the St John's Wood Chapel, to provide accommodation for airmen.

In 1945, a scheme for the reorganization of the Marylebone parishes proposed that the parish of Christ Church should be united with Saint Barnabas, Bell Street, while losing St John's Wood Chapel, which would become a new parish church, covering most of the former parish of St Stephen, Avenue Road. This scheme was not legally implemented until 1952, but at the beginning of 1948 Gibbs-Smith resigned and different incumbents were appointed for the parishes of Christ Church with St Barnabas and St Stephen with St John. Gibbs-Smith became Archdeacon of London and was later Dean of Winchester.

In 1971 the parish of Christ Church was united with St Paul, Rossmore Road, to create a parish called Christ Church and St Paul. Both churches were parish churches of this new parish until Christ Church was declared redundant in January 1977. In July 1978 the parish was united with St Mark with St Luke, Marylebone, to be served by a team ministry.

== Rectors of Christ Church ==
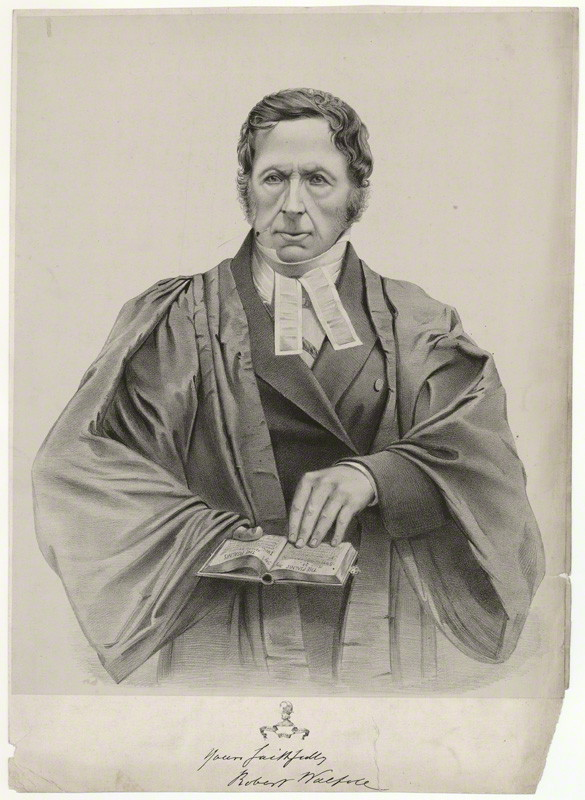
Robert Walpole

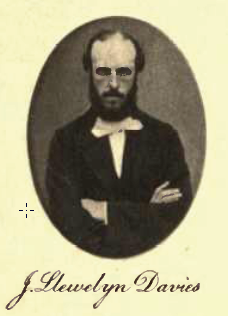

- 1825–1828: George Saxby Penfold
- 1828–1856: Robert Walpole, a grandson of Horatio Walpole and great-nephew of Sir Robert Walpole, prime minister.
- 1856–1889: John Llewelyn Davies, also Honorary Chaplain to the Queen
- 1891–1899: Oswald Wardell-Yerburgh
- 1899–1907: Harry Alsager Sheringham (died in office)
- 1907–1923: George Mould
- 1923–1941: Thomas George Brierley Kay
- 1941–1948: Oswin Harvard Gibbs-Smith

== Other notable people ==
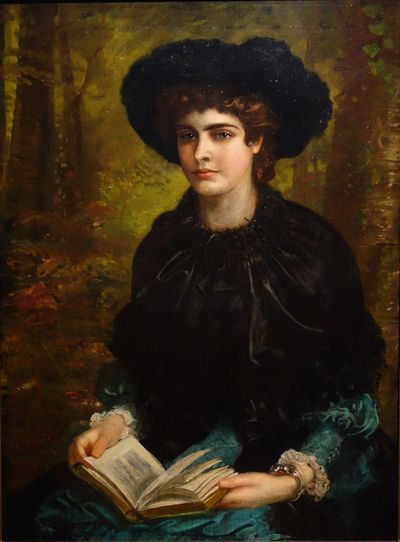
Constance Lloyd

Constance Lloyd, who later became an author and the wife of Oscar Wilde, was baptized at Christ Church on 9 June 1858.

In 1850, aged only fifteen, Arthur Sweatman, later Archbishop of Toronto, began to teach in the Sunday school of Christ Church, Marylebone.

Charles Wheatstone, scientist and inventor, married Emma West, daughter of John Hooke West, at Christ Church on 12 February 1847.

John Percy Groves, a military author, married Harriet Augusta Raines at Christ Church, Marylebone, on 11 March 1873.

Edward William Cox, writer and publisher, married his second wife, Rosalinda Alicia Fonblanque, only daughter of J. S. M. Fonblanque, Commissioner of Bankruptcy, at the church on 15 August 1844.

On 2 November 1830, at Christ Church, Marylebone, John Sterling married Susannah, a daughter of Lieutenant-General Charles Barton and his wife Susannah.

== See also ==
- Lisson Grove
