= William Cadman (priest) =

English Anglican priest

Reverend Canon William Cadman M.A.
- Rector of Holy Trinity Church, St Marylebone
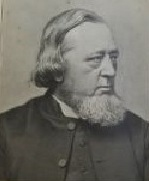
- Appointed: Canon of Canterbury and Chaplain to the Archbishop of Canterbury, Rector of Holy Trinity, St Marylebone,
- In office: 1883–1891; 1859–1891

Orders
- Ordination: 31 May 1840, St George's, Hanover Square, London

Personal details
- Born: 13 May 1815 Billinge, Lancashire, England
- Died: 12 May 1891 (aged 75) Marylebone, London
- Denomination: Church of England
- Spouse: Lœtitia Ann Rose Cadman
- Children: Rev.William Snape Cadman (1855-1907); Rev. John Montague Cadman (1856-1916)
- Occupation: Priest and evangelist
- Education: St Catharine's College, Cambridge

The Reverend Canon William Cadman (1815–1891), was an English Anglican priest and evangelist. He was ordained as a priest in 1840 and spent over fifty years administering the Christian mission to some of the most deprived communities in London. As Rector of parishes in Southwark and Marylebone he become famous in London for his preaching of the Gospel which often took place in venues away from the main parish church and sometimes in the open air. A committed evangelist at the forefront of the Evangelical Anglicanism revival that began at the end of the 18th century and continued into the 19th century, he established mission chapels and used licensed rooms and temporary places of worship to promote the mission in working class areas where church attendance had been in decline. His methods were largely successful and his influence on a younger generation of evangelicals was notable.

== Early life ==
William Cadman was born in Billinge, Lancashire on 13 May 1815, the elder son of a farmer William Cadman and his wife Mary Rigby. He came from an observant Anglican family and according to his biographer he possessed ...a deeply religious spirit from his boyhood ... Cadman showed a precocious ability to communicate his knowledge to an audience from an early age and before his adulthood was conducting catechism classes with young people in his local parish.

After a period as an assistant-teacher he entered St Catharine's College, Cambridge University in 1835, gaining a Bachelor of Arts in 1839 and was ordained as a deacon on 9 June 1839. He was ordained as a priest on 31 May 1840 and served as a curate in Brent Eleigh, Suffolk, from 1839 to 1844, also being awarded a Master of Arts in 1842. Cadman was part of an evangelical movement that was gathering pace in the 1840s and there was tension between the parish clergy and some parishioners who regarded his methods as over-zealous and Methodistical. This was not unique to Cadman's parish in Suffolk. In many rural parishes Church congregations were in decline, partly as a result of demographic changes as many left the countryside for work in the burgeoning cities but also as a consequence of the entrenchment of evangelical non-conformist churches who offered their members a simpler and often more fervent form of Christianity. In 1847 the uneasiness between traditional Anglican doctrine and the new evangelicalism was controversially exposed by the Gorham judgement that the Calvinistic view of baptismal regeneration was incompatible with Anglican doctrine. This caused years of intellectual conflict within the church. Cadman's biographer Rev. Leonard E Shelford is vague about Cadman's position in this controversy other than saying that he was in full sympathy with the Evangelical party. He opted to stay and deliver his evangelical vocation within the Anglican tradition. In order to make the Church more relevant to his parishioners lives he enlisted volunteer laity to help with the work. He instigated schoolroom lectures, missionary lectures and the catechising of children. He lamented the poor singing of his congregation and sought to change the character of the church services by instructing young people in the Singing class movement, then newly introduced by John Pyke Hullah.

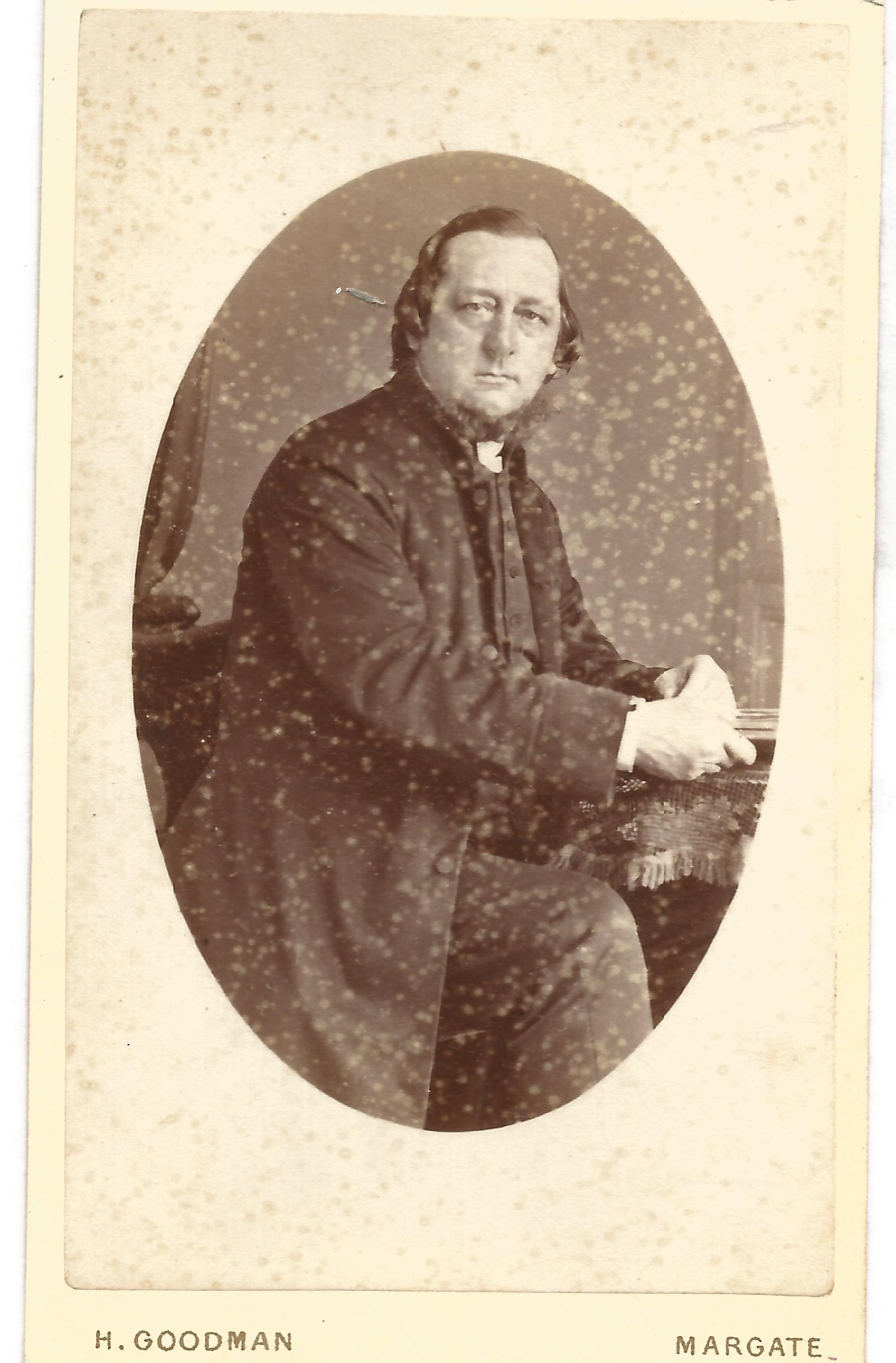
Carte de visite of William Cadman c.1860

== Rector of St George The Martyr, Southwark ==
In 1844 Cadman accepted the curacy offered to him by the Rev. Henry Montagu Villiers, Rector of St George's, Bloomsbury in London and later Bishop of Durham from 1860 to 1861, thus beginning a ministry in London that lasted fifty years. Cadman possessed a deep, sonorous voice and had by this time acquired considerable reputation as a preacher of lasting effect. Villiers gave him responsibility for the proprietary Park Chapel, Chelsea, a district of some 5,000 people where pastoral duties were onerous.

Cadman married Lœtitia Ann Rose Snape, the daughter of Rev. Richard Snape, Rector of his former parish at Brent Eleigh on 30 September 1846 and for next five years he developed Park Chapel into a community centre of Christian culture and influence where Bible classes and lectures were delivered. He cultivated close links with evangelical societies that included the Church Missionary Society and the Pastoral Aid Society founded a few years earlier in 1836 under the auspices of Lord Shaftesbury. In 1852 Cadman accepted the Rectory of St.George the Martyr, Southwark, one of the largest parishes in London with a nominal congregation of 30,000. The church in 1852 was capable of holding 1,000 persons but on Cadman's arrival was almost empty with its days at the centre of the local community apparently past. As Henry Mayhew had highlighted in articles for the Morning Chronicle in the 1840s the area contained much destitution and dire poverty. Cadman was able to fulfill a spiritual void for many and within a few months church services were full to hear Rev. Cadman preach. In January 1859 Cadman reported that there was nearly 200 voluntary agents employed in schools and institutions who met for a service at New Year to celebrate the work within the parish.

Cadman was not a man to often articulate his thoughts on paper but at the inaugural Church Congress, held at King's College, Cambridge in November 1861, he gave expression to the system that he had adopted in Southwark. He told Congress that the mother church was the centre of operations from which a body of volunteers worked in all parts of the community. Each clergyman was to associate with him: lay volunteers, a scripture readers, deacons, Bible women. He recommended establishing either a National or a ragged school in each sub-district with Scripture lessons provided by the local clergy. Schools could be licensed for worship and lectures commenced. The local congregations were to be empowered to lead on the construction of new churches and chapels. (Note: During Cadman's tenure as Rector of St George The Martyr, a chapel and the new church of St Paul's, Walworth were built. The latter was destroyed during the London Blitz and rebuilt.) He also recommended entrusting the help of evangelical societies including the London City Mission and the Church of England Young Men's Society.

== Rector of Holy Trinity Church, St Marylebone ==
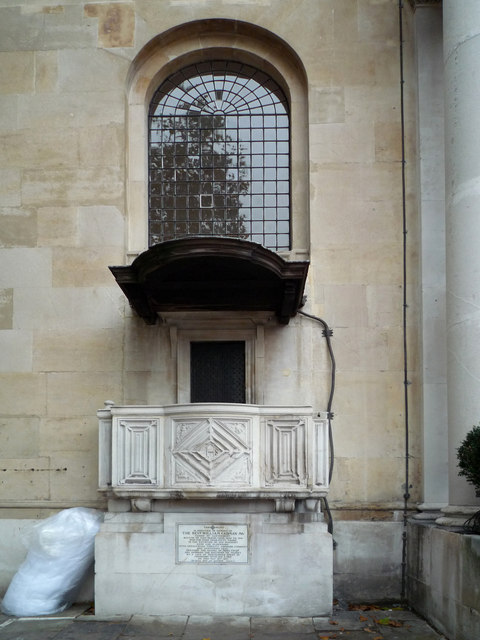
External memorial pulpit dedicated to Rev. William Cadman

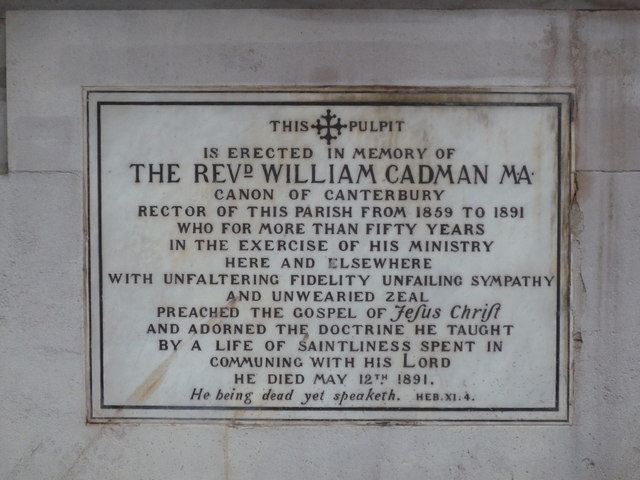
Plaque inscription to Cadman at Holy Trinity church

In 1857 the Rev. Shelford reported that there was concern for Cadman's health and that the toil and anxiety as he bore could not be indefinitely continued. Thus in 1859 Rev. Cadman accepted Prime Minister Henry Palmerston nomination of him to the important crown living of Holy Trinity, Marylebone, a post he would occupy for thirty-two years until his death. It was a smaller, more wealthy parish that had benefitted from the work of his predecessor Rev. Thomas Garnier who had been promoted to the Deanery of Lincoln. The church was well attended and the benefices substantial. Nevertheless, there was scope for Cadman's evangelical instincts to be exercised in reaching the thousands of poor families for whom contact with the Church was negligible. A similar pattern of organisation was adopted to Southwark. This included five mission chapels situated in a variety of places and a series of licensed rooms and other venues where Christian teachings were delivered. He incorporated more music into services with the rendering of responses and psalms in addition to familiar hymns and canticles. Cadman also continued with his practise of preaching in the open air. After his death in 1891 his parishioners erected an external memorial pulpit facing onto Marylebone Road.

In 1871-72 Cadman occupied the post of Select Preacher at Cambridge University and in 1883 Cadman was appointed to the residentiary Canonry of Canterbury, in recognition of his reputation as a preacher and evangelist. It afforded the declining Cadman lighter duties during his periods at Canterbury. The parish was in capable hands during his absences for he had identified potential talent to assist in parish work and a number of his curates were to attain high positions within the Church: George Hose, became Bishop of Labuan and Sarawak and Canon Allan Smith, Chancellor of St.David's. In 1886 Cadman was elected by the clergy of the diocese as a Proctor to Convocation.

William Cadman was seriously ill by the time his wife Lœtitia died on 12 January 1891 and he died in Marylebone four months later on 12 May 1891. He is buried with his wife in the churchyard of St Martin's, Canterbury. A memorial to Cadman and his wife in the form of an inscription on the reredos in the Chapel of St Anselm in Canterbury Cathedral was erected in 1895.

== Biography ==
- Shelford, Rev. Leonard E. (1892). A Memorial of the Rev. William Cadman M.A., Paternoster Buildings E C, London: Wells Gardner, Darton & Co.

== Bibliography ==
- Hullah, J. Wilhem's Method of Teaching Singing, adapted to English Use under Supervision of Committee of Council on Education (J.W. Parker, London 1841). Revised and Reconstructed Edition (Longmans & Co., London 1849). (After Guillaume Louis Bocquillon Wilhem (1781-1842).) (Further Editions, and in America as J. Hullah and J.B. Sharland, The Grammar School Chorus: containing Wilhem's Method of Teaching Vocal Music (Oliver Ditson & Co./C.H. Ditson & Co., Boston and New York 1860).
- Avis Paul D.L. (2008) The Identity of Anglicanism: Essentials of Anglican Ecclesiology HarperCollins. ISBN 0567032035
- Bebbington, D.W. (1982) The Nonconformist Conscience: Chapel and Politics, 1870–1914, George Allen & Unwin. ISBN 0049421735
- Eisen, Sydney (1990). The Victorian Crisis of Faith and the Faith That was Lost In Helmstadter, Richard J.; Lightman, Bernard (eds.). Victorian Faith in Crisis: Essays on Continuity and Change in Nineteenth-Century Religious Belief. Palgrave Macmillan UK.
- Hilton, Boyd. (1988) The Age of Atonement: The Influence of Evangelicalism on Social and Economic Thought. Oxford: Clarendon Press, 1988.ISBN 0198202954
- Mayhew, Henry (Author), Neuburg Victor (Editor, Introduction). (1862) London Labour and the London Poor Penguin Classic ISBN 0140432418
