= Oswald Wardell-Yerburgh =

English clergyman

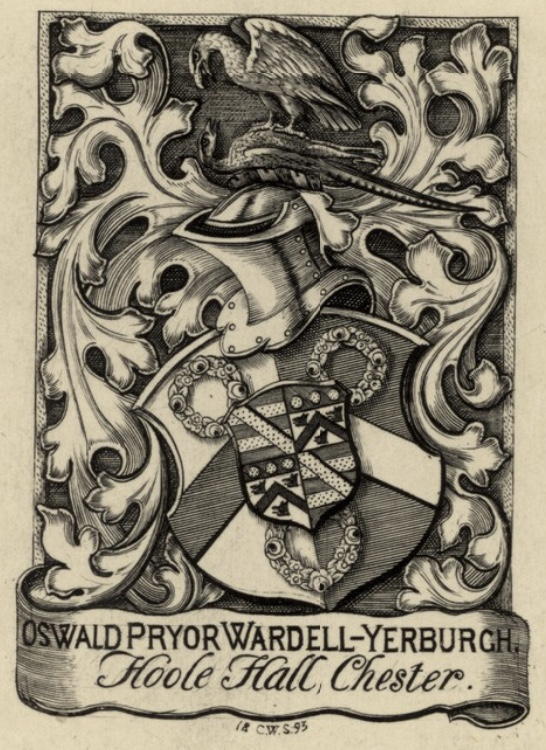
Bookplate of O. P. Wardell-Yerburgh, 1893, by C. W. Sherborn

Canon Oswald Pryor Wardell-Yerburgh (23 February 1858 – 14 November 1913), until 1889 known as Oswald Pryor Yerburgh, was a Church of England clergyman who held numerous offices.

He added the Wardell name to his own when he married the heiress to a banking fortune.

== Life ==
Wardell-Yerburgh was the sixth son of the Rev. Richard Yerburgh, Rector of High Bickington, Devon, and Vicar of Sleaford, Lincolnshire, by his marriage to Susan, one of the daughters of John Higgin, of Greenfield, Lancashire. His mother, a niece of William Higgin, Bishop of Derry and Raphoe, died in 1860, and he was brought up by his father, before being educated at Sleaford and Boston Grammar School and then at Trinity College, Dublin, where he graduated BA and MA.

The young Yerburgh was Curate of St Peter's, Eaton Square, from 1881 to 1891, then Rector of Christ Church, Marylebone, until 1899, and from 1895 to 1897 was Commissary for Charles Scott, Bishop of North China. At Marylebone he was chairman of three school governing bodies and a member of the boards of the Paddington Green Children's Hospital and the London Playing Fields Association.

In 1899, Wardell-Yerburgh resigned from his rectory at Marylebone to accept the vicarages of Tewkesbury and the neighbouring Walton Cardiff, in Gloucestershire. He also quickly became Guardian of the Poor for Tewkesbury and a Surrogate for the Diocese of Gloucester, Rural Dean of Winchcomb, 1902–1907, an Honorary Canon of Gloucester Cathedral, from 1904, Rural Dean of Tewkesbury, from 1907, and for 1908-1909 was Gloucester's Proctor, or representative, in the Convocation of Canterbury. Outside the life of the church, he was also an Income Tax Commissioner for Gloucestershire and a Land Tax Commissioner.

Wardell-Yerburgh edited Marriage Addresses and Marriage Hymns, published in 1900.

He died suddenly on the morning of 14 November 1913. After taking Matins, he went riding and was taken ill on the way home. An oak lobby was erected at Tewkesbury Abbey to his memory. Decorated with gothic motifs, it was designed by W. D. Caröe.

== Family ==
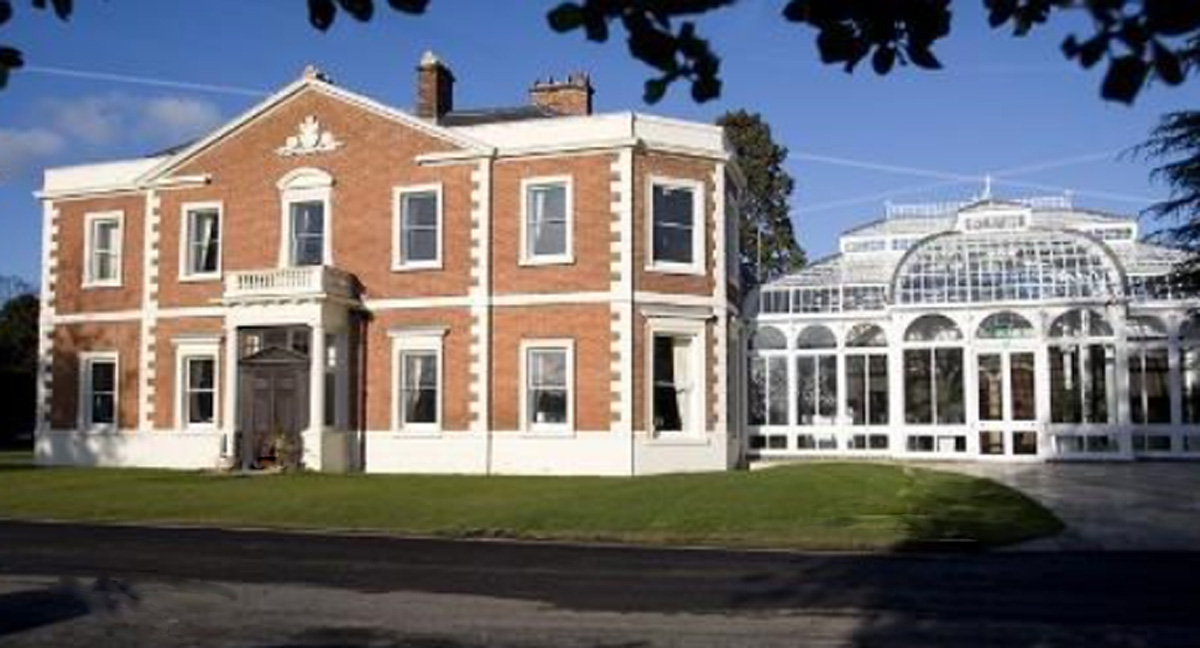
Hoole Hall

Wardell-Yerburgh, who was the son and grandson of clergymen, had ten full brothers and sisters: Richard Eustre, Susan Edith, John Eardley, Robert Armstrong, Mary Florence, Edmond Rochfort, Rachel, Harry Beauchamp, Lucy Isabel, and Charlotte Elizabeth. By his father's second marriage in 1863 he had two half-sisters, Annie Constance and Mabel Stanley. He was also an uncle of Robert Yerburgh, 1st Baron Alvingham. Edmund Rochfort Yerburgh's book about the family's history was published in 1912.

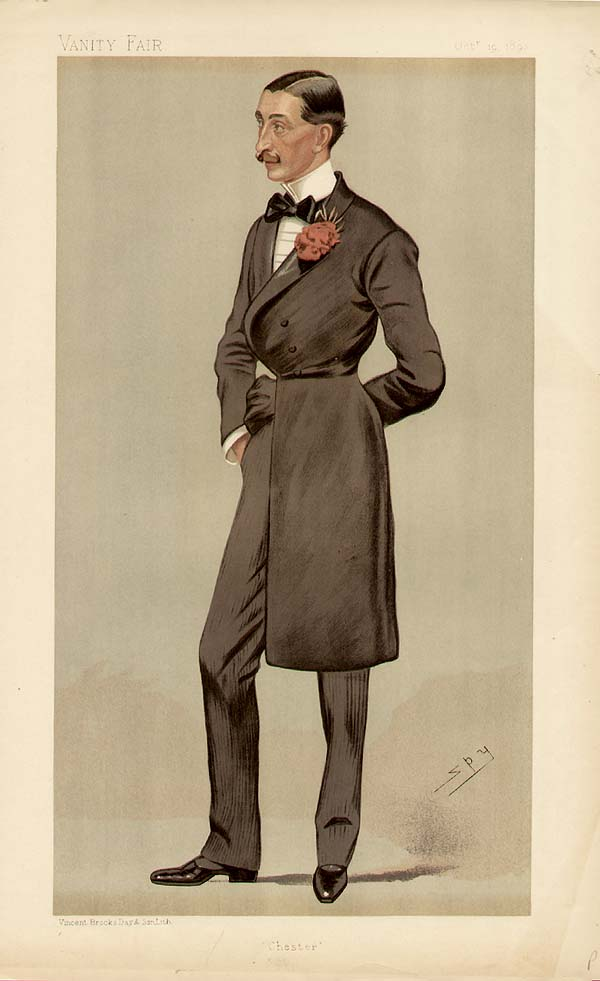
Robert Armstrong Yerburgh, by Spy in Vanity Fair, 1893

In 1889, at St George's, Hanover Square, Oswald Yerburgh married Edith Wardell Potts, of Hoole Hall, heiress to a banking fortune, and combined their names the same year by assuming by Royal Licence the additional name of Wardell. The Wardell-Yerburghs had three children, Hilda (1890–1941), Arthur (1891–1953), who became an officer of the Royal Navy, and Geoffrey Basset (1893–1944). In 1938 Mrs Wardell-Yerburgh was living at Eastwood Manor, East Harptree. She died on 22 July 1941, aged 82, three months after the death of her daughter Hilda, who had choked to death on a fish-bone. Both had been living at Littlewood House, Frampton, Dorset.

In 1923 Hilda married Hubert Reginald Ebbels, an executive of Blyth Brothers and Co., but she separated from her husband after he settled in Mauritius. The older son, Arthur, married firstly in 1921 Enid Till, daughter of John Till of Kemerton Court, and they had one child, John Gerald Oswald (born 1925), but they were divorced in 1931, after a failed fruit farming business. Secondly, Arthur married Marion G. Cooper later in 1931. With her, he had two children, Sarah (born and died 1933), and Richard (1935).

The younger son, Geoffrey Basset Wardell-Yerburgh, in 1935 married Elizabeth Kenyon, daughter of G. L. T. Kenyon, a grandson of Lloyd Kenyon, 3rd Baron Kenyon, and was the father of Oswald Kenyon (1936) and Hugh Wardell-Yerburgh (1938–1970), an Olympic oarsman. After Eton, Oswald Kenyon became an officer in the 10th Royal Hussars, in 1960 married Daphne Anne Whitley, and is the father of Susan Elizabeth (1961) and Peter Geoffrey (1964).

Canon Oswald Rochfort Yerburgh (1900–1966), a nephew and namesake of Wardell-Yerburgh, was Rector of Maperton in Somerset and later Vicar of Steeple Ashton, Wiltshire.

== Arms ==
Wardell-Yerburgh received a grant of arms, which quartered the existing arms of Wardell and Yerburgh, with a crest of "a falcon close or, belled of the last, preying on a mallard proper."
