= Listed buildings in Rock Ferry =

Rock Ferry is a suburb of Birkenhead, Wirral, Merseyside, England. It contains 36 buildings that are recorded in the National Heritage List for England as designated listed buildings, all of which are listed at Grade II. This grade is the lowest of the three gradings given to listed buildings and is applied to "buildings of national importance and special interest". The area is residential, and developed originally as a private estate by Jonathan Bennison in 1836–1837 (189 years ago). Most of the listed buildings are large houses and associated structures built in this development. The other listed buildings are a slipway into the River Mersey, a sea wall, a swimming baths and two churches.

Name and location	Photograph	Date	Notes
Rock Ferry Slipway; 53.37464°N 3.00035°W		1820	The slipway is thought to be the earliest surviving solid structure to be built into the River Mersey, and is about 230 metres (755 ft) long. Its surface consists of sandstone and granite setts. On the sides are large sandstone blocks, iron rings, and timber bulwarks. The slipway is no longer in use.
Sea wall to Esplanade; 53.37018°N 2.99741°W		c. 1830–35	The wall between the Esplanade and the sea is in stone, and is about 8 feet (2.4 m) high.
1 and 2 Rock Park; 53.37275°N 3.00125°W		c. 1836	A pair of ashlar-faced houses with a hipped Welsh slate roof in Italianate style. They have two storeys with basements, and each house has a two-bay front. The entrances are on the sides and have porches with parapets. The windows are sashes with a variety of surrounds. The walls, railings, and gate piers with (moulded caps are included in the listing.
3 and 4 Rock Park; 53.37253°N 3.00100°W		c. 1836	A pair of ashlar-faced houses with a Welsh slate roof in two storeys with attics and basements. Each house has a three-bay front, the outer bays being gabled, and a further wing on the outsides. The entrances are on the sides with projecting porches. At the rear are canted bay windows with cast iron balconies. The walls and cylindrical gate piers with fluted caps are included in the listing.
5 and 6 Rock Park; 53.37235°N 3.00065°W		c. 1836	A pair of stone houses with Welsh slate roofs in Elizabethan style with a complex plan. No. 5 is in two ranges with one storey facing the road and two facing the river. No. 6 has two parallel ranges with three storeys and three bays facing the river. The octagonal gate piers with stepped pyramidal caps are included in the listing.
7 Rock Park; 53.37202°N 3.00042°W		c. 1836	A roughcast house with a Welsh slate roof. It has two storeys and three bays with a central entrance. The windows are sashes. At the rear is a canted oriel window with a gable above.
8 and 9 Rock Park; 53.37187°N 3.00014°W		c. 1836	A pair of stuccoed houses with a Welsh hipped slate roof in Neoclassical style. They have two storeys with attics and basements, and each house has a three-bay front. The doorways are in the central bay of each house, and have fanlights and architraves with triglyph friezes and balustraded cornices. Most of the windows are sashes, and all have architraves. Recessed on the outer side of each house is a service wing, and at the rear are canted bay windows.
10 and 11 Rock Park; 53.3716°N 2.9998°W		c. 1836	Pair of houses. Stucco, rusticated to ground floor, with Welsh slate roof. Italianate style. 2 storeys with attic and basement, symmetrically-designed with central porch occupying angle between main range and advanced outer gables and 3-window range to each house, the outer bays forming advanced gables.
12 and 13 Rock Park; 53.37115°N 2.99931°W		c. 1836	A pair of rendered houses with Welsh slate roofs in Gothic style with two storeys. On the front are three wide gables with two smaller gables between. Under the smaller gables are doorways with sidelights, fanlights, and with traceried windows above. The other windows are mullioned and transomed. To the right of No. 13 is a recessed bay with a conservatory in the angle.
14 and 15 Rock Park; 53.37088°N 2.99905°W		c. 1836	A pair of rendered houses with a rusticated ground floor and Welsh slate roofs in Italianate style. They have two storeys, attics and basements, and each house has a three-bay front, the outer bays projecting forward under gables. The porch is in the middle bay; this and the ground floor windows are round-headed, as are the attic windows. No. 14 has an additional outer bay. At the rear are canted bay windows and balconies. The square gate piers with shallow pyramidal caps are included in the listing.
16 and 17 Rock Park; 53.37058°N 2.99860°W		c. 1836	A pair of ashlar-faced houses with a Welsh slate roof in Neoclassical style. They have two storeys, and each house has a three-bay front, the outer bays having hipped gables. In the centre of each house is a two-storey porch with a pyramidal roof, and a lean-to verandah. The windows are sashes. At the rear are canted bay windows and balconies on cast iron columns. The gate piers with shallow pyramidal caps are included in the listing.
18 Rock Park; 53.37036°N 2.99842°W		c. 1836	An ashlar-faced house with a rusticated ground floor and a hipped Welsh slate roof in Neoclassical style. It has two storeys and a four-bay front. The central doorway has a fanlight and a pediment. The windows are sashes, those in the lower floor with architraves. (Largely destroyed by fire 2014)
19 Rock Park; 53.37014°N 2.99812°W		c. 1836	A stone house with a rusticated ground floor and a Welsh slate roof, in Neoclassical style. It has two storeys and a three-bay front. The central doorway has a fanlight and a pedimented canopy, with a full-height bow window to the right. The other windows are sashes. To the left is a two-storey four-bay service wing. The square gate piers with shallow pyramidal caps are included in the listing.
20 and 21 Rock Park; 53.36998°N 2.99891°W		c. 1836	A pair of stuccoed houses with a rusticated ground floor and a Welsh slate roof, in Neoclassical style. They have two storeys and each house has a two-bay front and an entrance on the side. The gabled outer bays project forward and each contains a canted bay window. The round-arched doorways have entablatures on consoles. The square gate piers with stepped pyramidal caps are included in the listing.
31 Rock Park; 53.36963°N 2.99966°W		c. 1836	A stone house, formerly two houses, with a Welsh slate roof, in Tudor style. It has two storeys and an attic, and a two-bay front with a recessed narrow entrance bay on the right. The main right bay is gabled and contains a canted bay window. The windows are sashes, and there is a coped dormer in the left wing. The polygonal gate piers with domed caps are included in the listing.
32 and 33 Rock Park; 53.36986°N 2.99979°W		c. 1836	A pair of stuccoed houses with Welsh slate roofs in Italianate style. They have two storeys with attics and basements. On the front is a central gable flanked by narrow bays each containing a doorway with a fanlight and a moulded architrave. In the centre, each house has a canted bay window, above which is a window in a moulded architrave. Over this is a round-arched window in a dormer with a segmental pediment.
42 and 43 Rock Park; 53.37162°N 3.00161°W		c. 1836	A pair of rendered houses with concrete tile roofs in two storeys. Each house has a two-bay front, the outer bays gabled, projecting slightly forward, and containing a single-storey canted bay window. On each side is a two-storey porch.
Gate piers (east); 53.37318°N 3.00198°W		c. 1836	Two stuccoed octagonal gate piers with recessed panels and shallow pyramidal caps. Originally at an entrance to the park, they have since been moved here.
Gate piers (west); 53.37179°N 3.00151°W		c. 1836	Two stuccoed octagonal gate piers with recessed panels and shallow pyramidal caps. Originally at an entrance to the park, they have since been moved here.
3 Rock Lane East; 53.37171°N 3.00239°W		c. 1840	An ashlar-faced house with a rusticated ground floor, and a Welsh slate roof, in Neoclassical style. It has two storeys and a symmetrical three-bay front. The central doorway has an Ionic portico. The windows are sashes, those in the lower floor having cast iron colonettes, voussoirs and keystones. The upper floor windows have mouldeded architraves. At the rear are a French window and dormers.
5 Rock Lane East; 53.37149°N 3.00242°W		c. 1840	An ashlar-faced house with a concrete tiled roof. It has a square plan with three bays on each front, and is in two storeys. The windows are sashes. On the front facing the road is a projecting gabled wing and a doorway. There is another doorway on the right side, and a canted bay window at the rear.
7 Rock Lane East; 53.37117°N 3.00256°W		c. 1840	An ashlar-faced house with a Welsh slate roof in Neoclassical style. It has two storeys and a symmetrical three-bay front. The central doorway has a portico with paired Doric columns. The windows are sashes, those in the lower floor being round-headed with voussoirs and keystones. The upper floor windows have pedimented architraves and decorated friezes. The front wall and gate piers with ball finials are included in the listing.
12 Rock Lane East; 53.37212°N 3.00283°W		c. 1840	A stuccoed house with a Welsh slate roof in Gothic style. It has two storeys with an attic and a symmetrical three-bay front, the central bay projecting slightly forward and gabled. The central doorway has a fanlight and hood mould, and above the door are a balcony and French windows. The other windows are sashes, also with hood moulds. There are gables on the sides; all the gables have fretted bargeboards. The wall and octagonal gate piers with pyramidal caps are included in the listing.
34 and 35 Rock Park; 53.37029°N 3.00018°W		c. 1840	A pair of roughcast houses with Welsh slate roofs in simple Italianate style, later divided into flats. They have two storeys with attics and basements. Each house has a front of three bays and a recessed bay outside them. This bay has a porch containing a round-headed doorway with a moulded architrave. The windows are replaced, those in the lower storey having round heads with keystones supporting a balcony with a cast iron balustrade.
36 and 37 Rock Park; 53.37081°N 3.00086°W		c. 1840	A pair of roughcast houses with a Welsh slate roof in two storeys. They are symmetrical and each house has a two-bay front, the outer bays projecting slightly forward. The windows are sashes, and the entrances are on the sides.
38 and 39 Rock Park; 53.37094°N 3.00140°W		c. 1840	A pair of stuccoed house with a rusticated ground floor and a hipped Welsh slate roof in Neoclassical style. They have two storeys and a four-bay front, the bays divided by pilasters. The entrances are through porches on the sides. The windows are sashes in moulded architraves, the outer ones in the ground floor having mullions and voussoirs.
40 and 41 Rock Park; 53.37130°N 3.00154°W		c. 1840	A pair of rendered houses with a roof partly in Welsh slate and partly in concrete tiles. They have two storeys, and each house has a three-bay front, the centre bays gabled and projecting forward. The doorways have entablatures and fanlights. The windows are varied.
Oakleigh; 53.36932°N 2.99736°W		c. 1840	An ashlar-faced house with a Welsh slate roof in simple Neoclassical style. It is in two storeys, and has a symmetrical three-bay front. The central bay has a pedimented gable, and a projecting porch that has a doorway with an entablature. The windows are sashes. On the left is a 20th-century service wing.
The Roft; 53.37192°N 3.00289°W		c. 1840	A stuccoed house with a Welsh slate roof in two storeys with an attic. It has a symmetrical three-bay front, with a large timber porch added in about 1900. Flanking it are mullioned and transomed windows with entablatures on consoles. In the upper floor the bays are divided by pilasters, and the windows are sashes with mouldeded architraves.
Royal Mersey Yacht Club; 53.37420°N 3.00366°W		c. 1840	Originally two houses, later used as a yacht clubhouse, in brick with stone dressings, and with a Welsh slate roof. It has two storeys and a six-bay front. The outer bays project forward and are gabled. The entrances are on the sides, and the windows are sashes with architraves and hood moulds.
St Margaret's; 53.37295°N 3.00393°W		c. 1840	Originally a house, or two houses, later used as a convent, it is ashlar-faced, the lower storey being rusticated, with a Welsh slate roof. The building is in Neoclassical style, with two storeys and a six-bay north front containing two doorways, one with an architrave. The west front is the principal face, and has a pedimented centre flanked by bays containing bay windows and gables.
Toftcombs; 53.36967°N 2.99778°W		c. 1840	A stuccoed house with a Welsh slate roof in two storeys, and in Tudor style. It has an asymmetrical plan, with three different-sized gables facing the road. The doorway is on the right side, it has a fanlight, and there is a recessed cross above it. Other features include oriel windows, an octagonal turret, a canted bay window, and octagonal chimney stacks.
St Peter's Church; 53.36933°N 3.00200°W		1841–42	The church was designed by Hurst and Moffat in Neo-Norman style, a Gothic chancel was added in about 1884, and repairs and alterations were carried out following damage in the Second World War. It is in sandstone with slate roofs, and consists of a nave, a chancel with a vestry, north and south chapels, and a west steeple. The steeple is in three stages, and has a broach spire with lucarnes.
Highfield United Reformed Church; 53.36724°N 3.00942°W		1870–71	Originally a Congregational church by David Walker, it is built in Storeton stone with Welsh slate roofs. The church consists of a nave, aisles, shallow transepts, and a southwest steeple. The steeple has a tower, a broach spire and the bases of angle pinnacles, and the windows contain Decorated tracery. To the east of the church is a complex of hall and vestries.
Ravenswood; 53.36482°N 3.00964°W		1874	Originally a house, later incorporated into a school, it has retained many of its external and internal features. The house is in stone with a slate roof. It has two storeys with attics and three bays. The entrance is in the central gabled bay, and it has a porch with a coat of arms in a roundel above. To the right is a square bay window that has a balcony with a pierced parapet. Most of the windows are mullioned, and some are also transomed.
St Anne's Church and presbytery 53.37110°N 3.01120°W		1875–74	A Roman Catholic church by E. W. Pugin in Decorated style completed by Pugin and Pugin. It is in sandstone with roofs of slate and asphalt and has crested ridges. A two-storey brick presbytery by Peter Paul Pugin was added in 1884–85. The church has a cruciform plan, and consists of a nave, a baptistry, aisles, transepts, and a chancel flanked by chapels.
Byrne Avenue Baths; 53.37030°N 3.01428°W		1931–33	The swimming baths were designed by Robert W Johnston in Classical style with Art Deco features. They are built in reinforced concrete, with dressings in red brick and yellow concrete and a slate roof. The baths have a rectangular plan with a central entrance hall and two pools. Many of the original internal features have been retained. The boundary wall, railings and gates are included in the listing.
