= St Mary's Church, Morecambe =

St Mary's Church
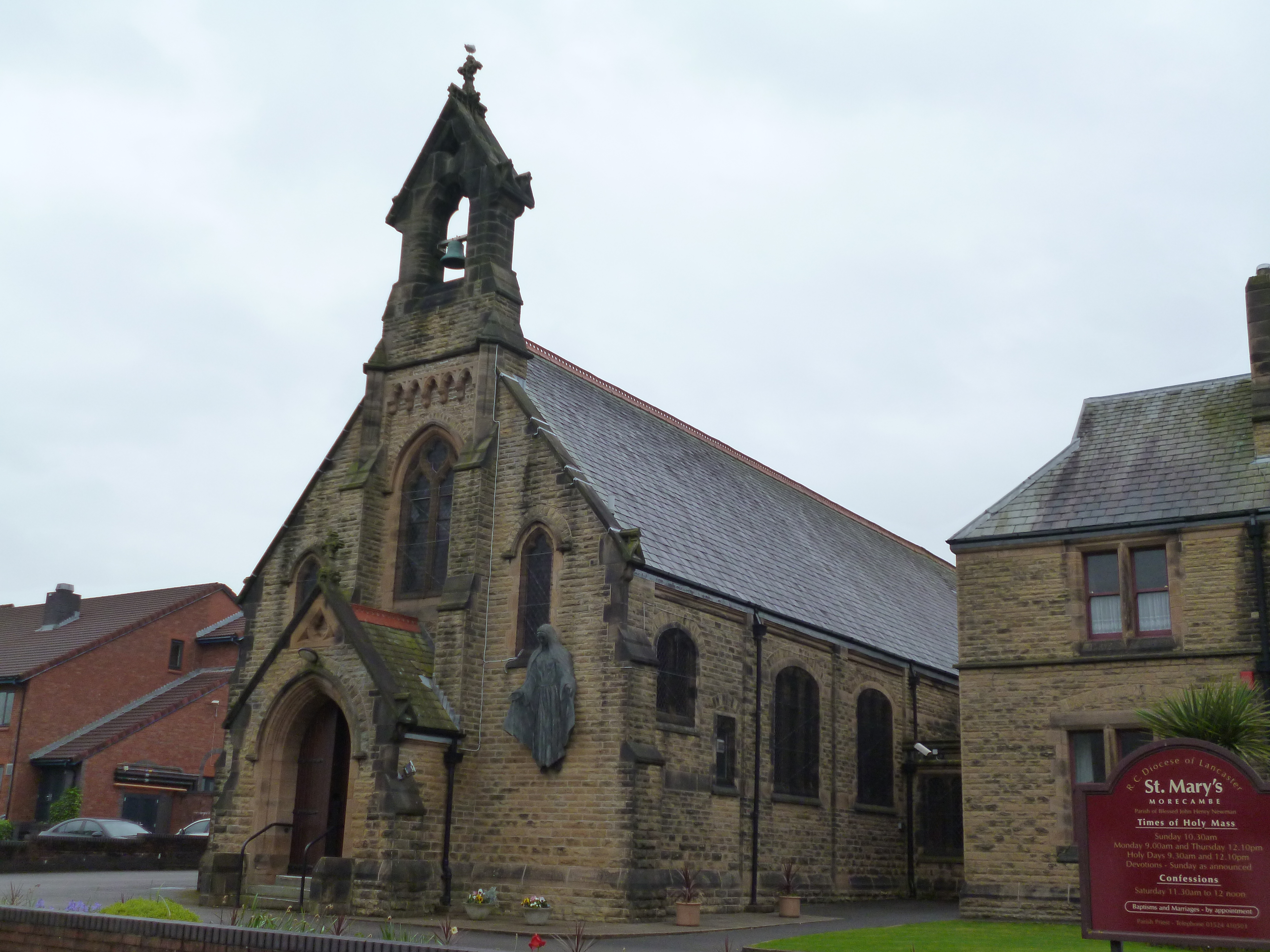
- St Mary's Church
- 54.0749°N 2.85916°W
- OS grid reference: SD 43880 64670
- Location: Morecambe
- Country: England
- Denomination: Roman Catholic
- Website: SJHNParish.org.uk

History
- Status: Parish church
- Dedication: Saint Mary

Architecture
- Functional status: Active
- Architect: Pugin & Pugin
- Style: Gothic Revival
- Groundbreaking: 21 April 1895
- Construction cost: £3,000

Administration
- Province: Liverpool
- Diocese: Lancaster
- Deanery: St Peter’s Deanery
- Parish: St John Henry Newman

St Mary's Church is a Roman Catholic church in Morecambe, Lancashire, England. It is the first Catholic Church in Morecambe to be built after the Reformation. It is located on the corner of Lord Street and Matthias Street in the centre of the town. It was built in 1895 and designed by Pugin & Pugin in the Gothic Revival style.

== History ==
=== Construction ===
On 21 April 1895 the foundation stone of the church was laid by the Bishop of Liverpool Thomas Whiteside. The architects were Pugin & Pugin, an architectural firm that composed of Cuthbert Welby Pugin and Peter Paul Pugin, brothers of E. W. Pugin and sons of Augustus Pugin. They built the church in the Gothic Revival style with a capacity of 300 people. The construction was done by the contractor Charles Walker of Preston and the cost was £3,000.

=== Developments ===
In the 20th century, with the growing population in Morecambe, St Mary's Church was no longer large enough to accommodate the growing local Catholic congregation. So from St Mary's, new churches were built. These churches were St Patrick's Church on St John's Road in Heysham in the 1920s, the Good Shepherd Church, which moved into a former Wesleyan chapel in Torrisholme in 1962, and Holy Family Church in Westgate in 1979.

== Parish ==
St Mary's Church, with St Patricks Church, the Good Shepherd Church and the Holy Family Church comprise the parish of St John Henry Newman in Morecambe. St Mary's Church has two Sunday Masses at 8:30am and 10:30am. St Patrick's Church has two Sunday Masses at 6:00pm on Saturday and at 6:30pm on Sunday in Polish.

== See also ==
- Diocese of Lancaster
