= St Anne's Church, Liverpool =

St Anne's Church in Liverpool may refer to:

- Church of St Anne, Aigburth (1836–present), Anglican
- St Anne's Church, Edge Hill (1843–present), Roman Catholic
- St Anne's Church, Rock Ferry (1875–present), Roman Catholic
- St Anne's Church, Liverpool (1772-1871) (original building 1772–1871, newer location 1871–1971), Church of England
