= St Austin's Church, Stafford =

St Austin's Church
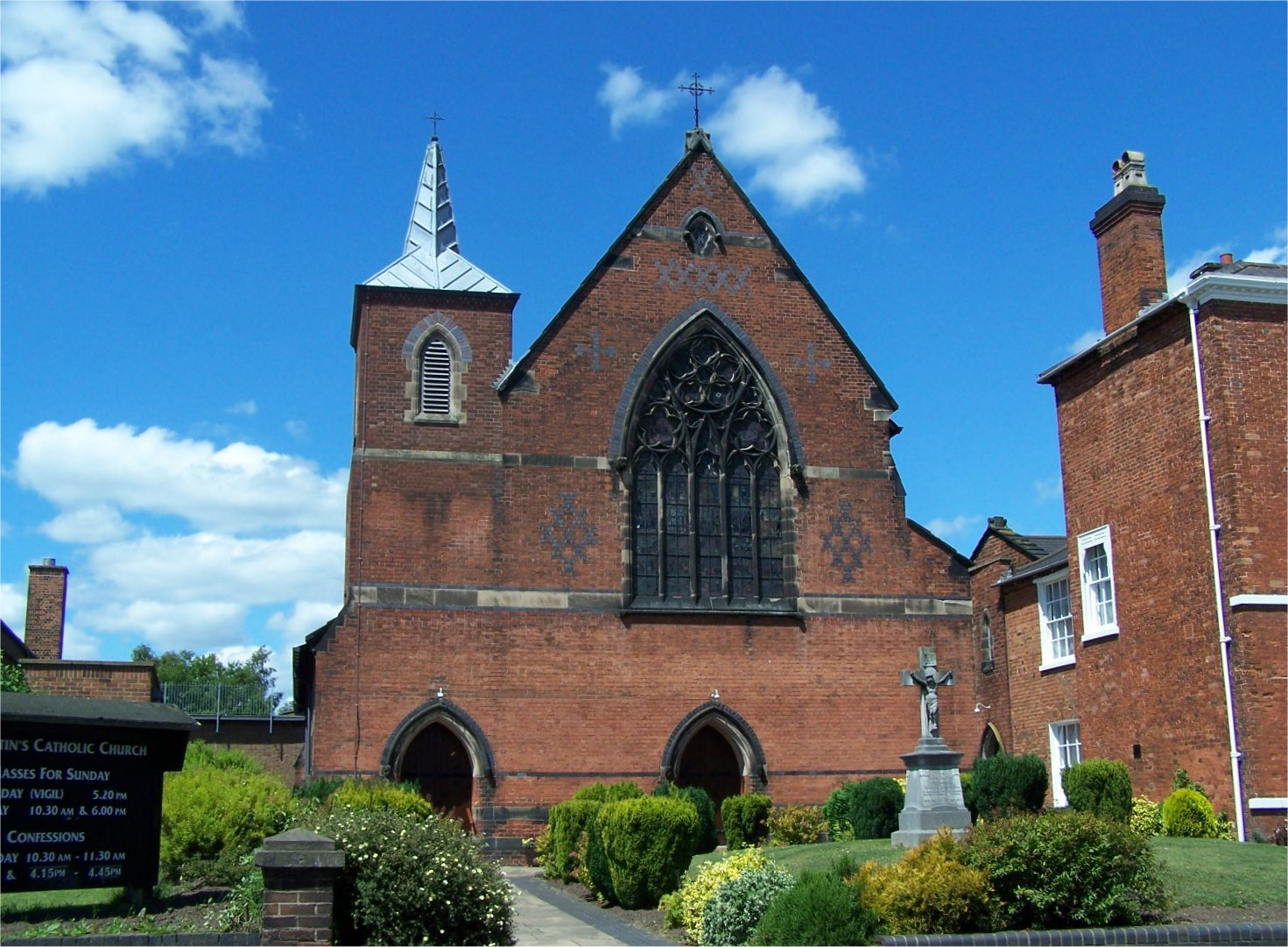
- St Austin's Church
- 52.8004°N 2.1157°W
- OS grid reference: SJ 92298 22540
- Location: Stafford
- Country: England
- Denomination: Roman Catholic
- Website: St Austin's, Stafford

History
- Status: Parish church
- Dedication: Augustine of Canterbury

Architecture
- Functional status: Active
- Heritage designation: Grade II listed
- Designated: 17 December 1971
- Architect: E. W. Pugin
- Style: Gothic Revival
- Groundbreaking: 21 May 1861
- Completed: 16 July 1862

Administration
- Province: Birmingham
- Archdiocese: Birmingham
- Deanery: Stafford
- Parish: St Austin's

St Austin's Church is a Roman Catholic parish church in Stafford, Staffordshire, England. It was built from 1861 to 1862 and designed by E. W. Pugin in the Gothic Revival style. It is located on Wolverhampton Road to the south of the town centre. It was later added to by Peter Paul Pugin and it is a Grade II listed building.

== History ==
=== Foundation ===
After the Reformation, the Stafford barons, who were descended from William Howard, 1st Viscount Stafford, himself descended from the Dukes of Norfolk, remained Catholic and supported the local Catholic population. In the 1760s, the Stafford family paid for a priest, Fr Thomas Barnaby to celebrate Mass in an attic in a house on the Green in the town. In the 1780s, Fr John Corne served the local mission, rented a house on Tipping Street and built a chapel in the garden. In 1791, the year of the Roman Catholic Relief Act 1791, a permanent chapel was built on Austin Friars. It is the earliest post-Reformation Catholic chapel in the town.

=== Construction ===
The current church was built next to the chapel on Austin Friars. The presbytery of the original chapel still exists. In 1819, the chapel was rebuilt by the architect Edward Jerningham. His family, the Jerninghams donated the stained glass and the stalls for the chancel. By 1851, a new larger church was needed to accommodate the 250+ people attending Mass in the chapel. In 1858, the priest at the time, Francis Amherst (before he became Bishop of Northampton), and his successor Fr John Wyse commissioned E. W. Pugin to design the current church. On 21 May 1861, the foundation stone was laid. In total, construction cost £3,000. On 16 July 1862, the church was opened.

=== Developments ===
From 1884 to 1894, a new high altar, reredos, Lady Chapel altar and the Sacred Heart Chapel altar were all added. Each of them was designed by Peter Paul Pugin. In the early 1900s, new confessionals and sacristies were built. In 1954, a parish hall was built next to the church. In 1962, a tower, designed by Sandy & Norris, was added to the church. In the 1990s, a spire was added to the short tower.

== Parish ==
St Austin's Church serves its own parish. It has Sunday Mass at 5:00pm on Saturday and at 11:00am on Sunday.

== Interior ==
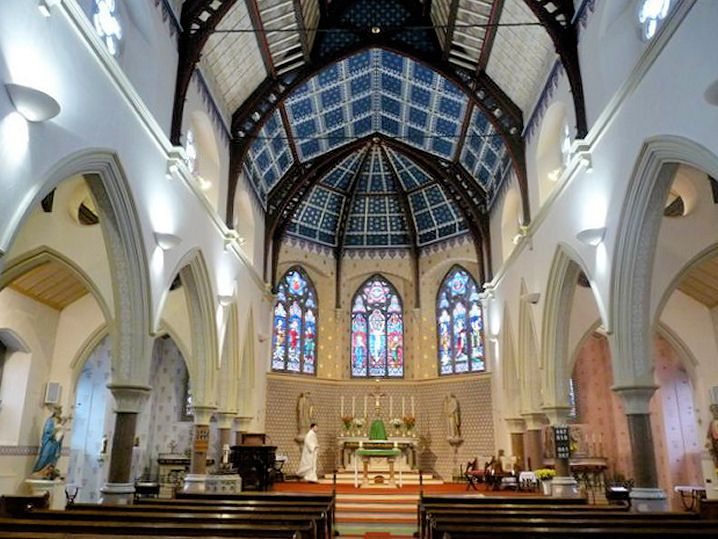
Interior

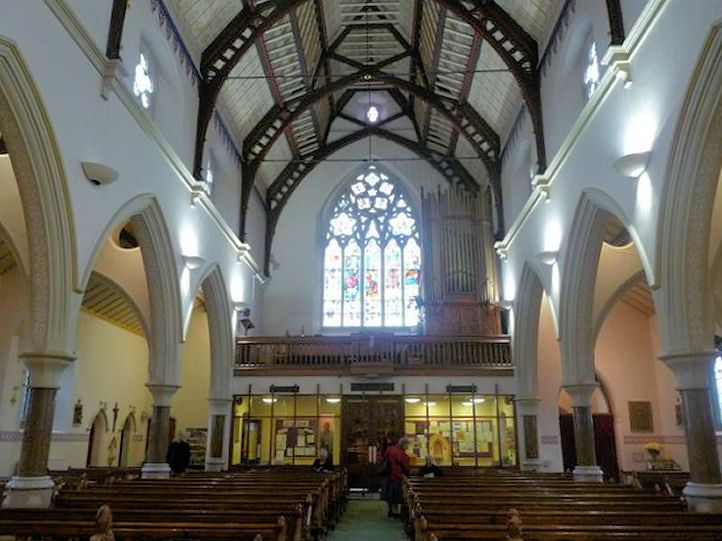
Organ

== See also ==
- Archdiocese of Birmingham
- Listed buildings in Stafford (Outer Area)
