= St Anne's Church, Rock Ferry =

Church in Birkenhead, Merseyside, England

Coordinates: 53°22′16″N 3°00′40″W

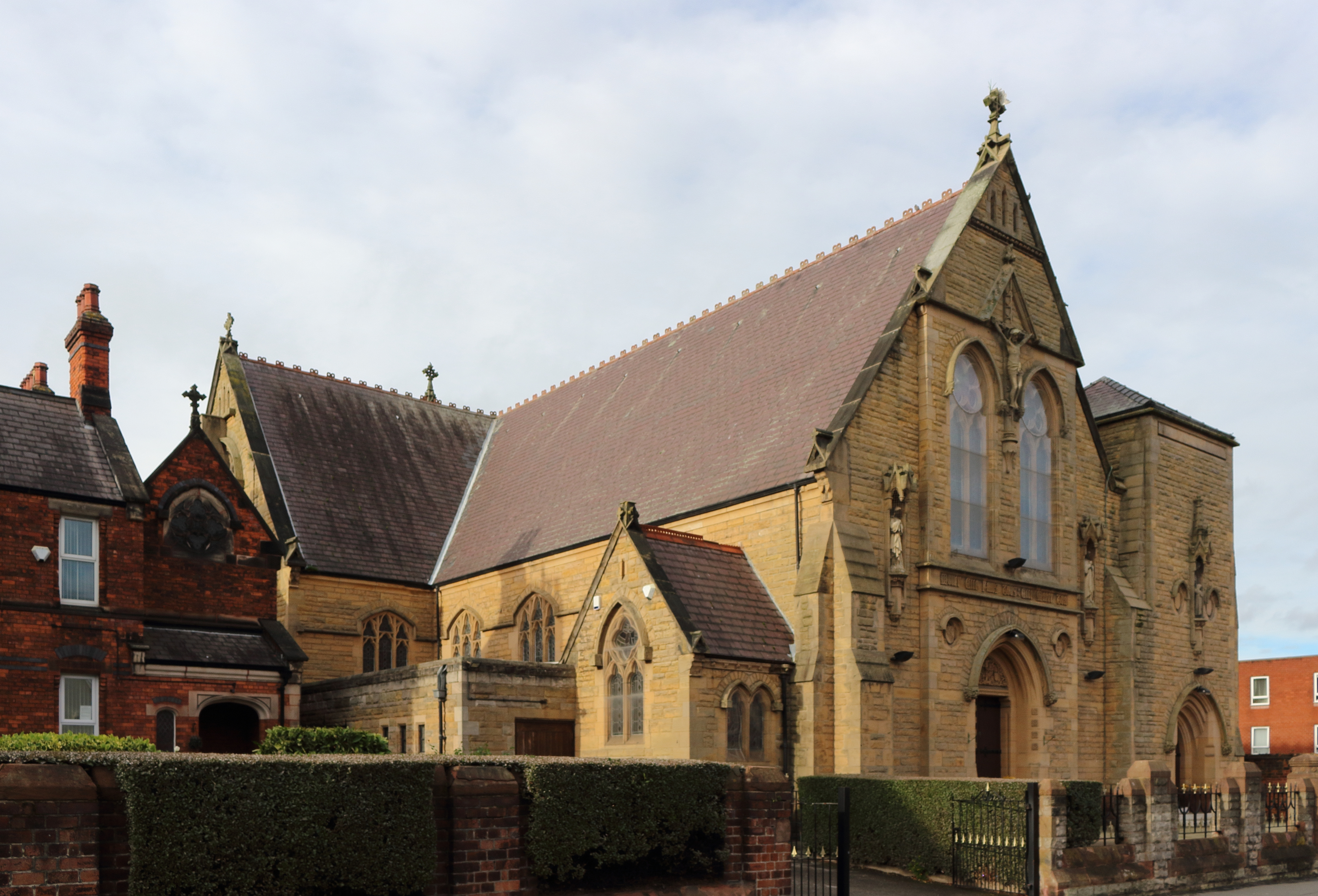
St Anne's Church, Highfield Road.

St Anne's Church is a Roman Catholic church on Highfield Road in Rock Ferry, Birkenhead, Merseyside, England. It is a Grade II listed building.

== History ==
It was built for the Oblates of St Mary Immaculate by Peter Paul Pugin and Cuthbert Pugin to designs by their brother Edward Welby Pugin - Edward had planned a south-west tower but this was never built. Its foundation stone was laid on 9 May 1875 by James Brown, Bishop of Shrewsbury and the church was opened on 28 October 1877. A presbytery was added between 1884 and 1885 and side aisles in 1934. The parish was served by the Oblates until it transferred the church to the Diocese of Shrewsbury in September 2010. The parish is currently served by Fr. Mario Ashuikeka and Rev. John Boggan.
