= English Martyrs Church, Tower Hill =

English Martyrs Church
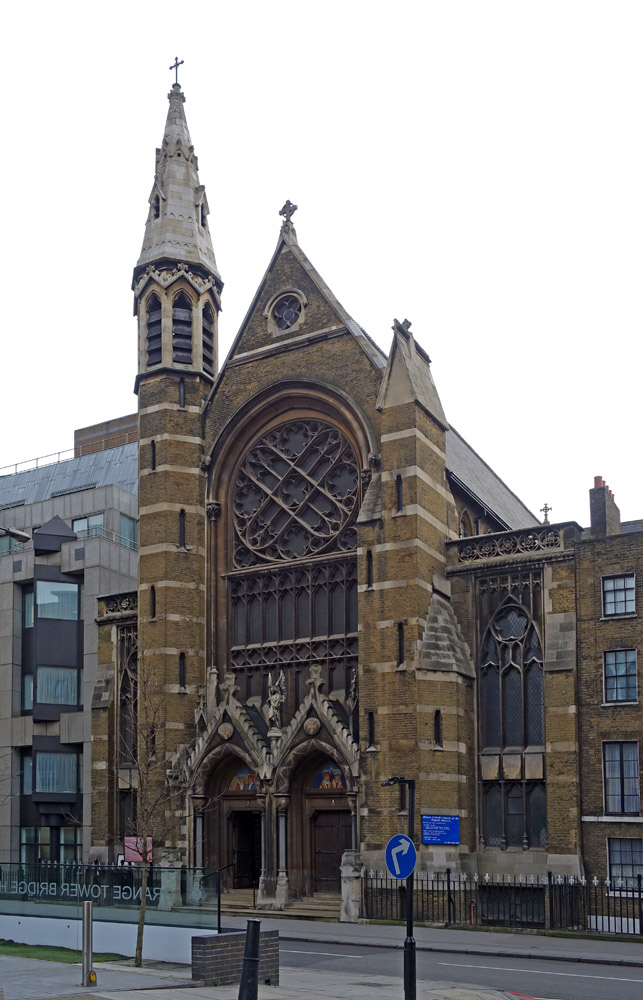
- English Martyrs Church
- 51.51141°N 0.07211°W
- Location: Tower Hill, London
- Country: England
- Denomination: Roman Catholic
- Religious institute: Oblates of Mary Immaculate
- Website: Parish.RCDoW.org.uk/TowerHill

History
- Founded: 1865
- Dedication: English Martyrs

Architecture
- Functional status: Active
- Heritage designation: Grade II listed
- Designated: 6 December 1982
- Architect(s): E. W. Pugin, Pugin & Pugin
- Style: Gothic Revival
- Groundbreaking: 18 May 1873
- Completed: 22 June 1876
- Construction cost: £10,000

Administration
- Archdiocese: Westminster
- Deanery: Tower Hamlets
- Parish: Tower Hill

English Martyrs Church is a Roman Catholic parish church in Tower Hill, London. It was built from 1873 to 1876, by Pugin & Pugin according to designs by their deceased brother, E. W. Pugin. It is located on Prescot Street, close to the Royal College of Psychiatrists. It was founded by the Missionary Oblates of Mary Immaculate and has been listed Grade II on the National Heritage List for England since 1982.

== History ==
=== Foundation ===
In 1864, the Missionary Oblates of Mary Immaculate were invited to Tower Hill and Kilburn by Cardinal Nicholas Wiseman to start missions serving the local Catholic communities. In 1865, the Oblates arrived and founded those missions. Construction work soon started on a temporary church and school on the church's present site. On 12 December 1866, the temporary church and school were opened by the Archbishop of Westminster, Cardinal Henry Manning. From 1870 to 1872, a new building constructed with a school on the ground floor and a chapel on the first floor.

=== Construction ===
On 18 May 1873, the foundation stone for English Martyrs Church was laid by Cardinal Manning. It was designed by E. W. Pugin, but work was delayed because of problems in buying the land and the death of Pugin on 5 June 1875. Pugin's brothers, Cuthbert Welby Pugin and Peter Paul Pugin carried on the work based on E. W. Pugin's designs. On 22 June 1876, Cardinal Manning opened the church. Construction work was done by Lascelles of Bunhill Row, and the cost was £10,000 (equivalent to £997,636 in 2025).

=== Developments ===
In 1881, the presbytery was rebuilt. The work was paid for by the Carthusians, in commemoration for the Carthusian Martyrs of London, executed at Tower Hill in 1535. In the 1890s, the school next door was enlarged, resulting in the demolition of the original sacristy and the building of a new one in the presbytery. In 1940, during the Second World War, the church was damaged by a 500 kg bomb which fell through the roof, damaged the side wall and destroyed the pulpit, but it did not explode. In 1970, the school was moved to St Mark Street and its old site became a community centre. In 1991, refurbishment work was done to the sanctuary and the church. In 2007, the roof was repaired and the interior repainted.

== Parish ==
In English Martyrs Church, there are three Sunday Masses, at 6:30pm on Saturday and at 9:00am and 11:00am on Sunday.

== Interior ==
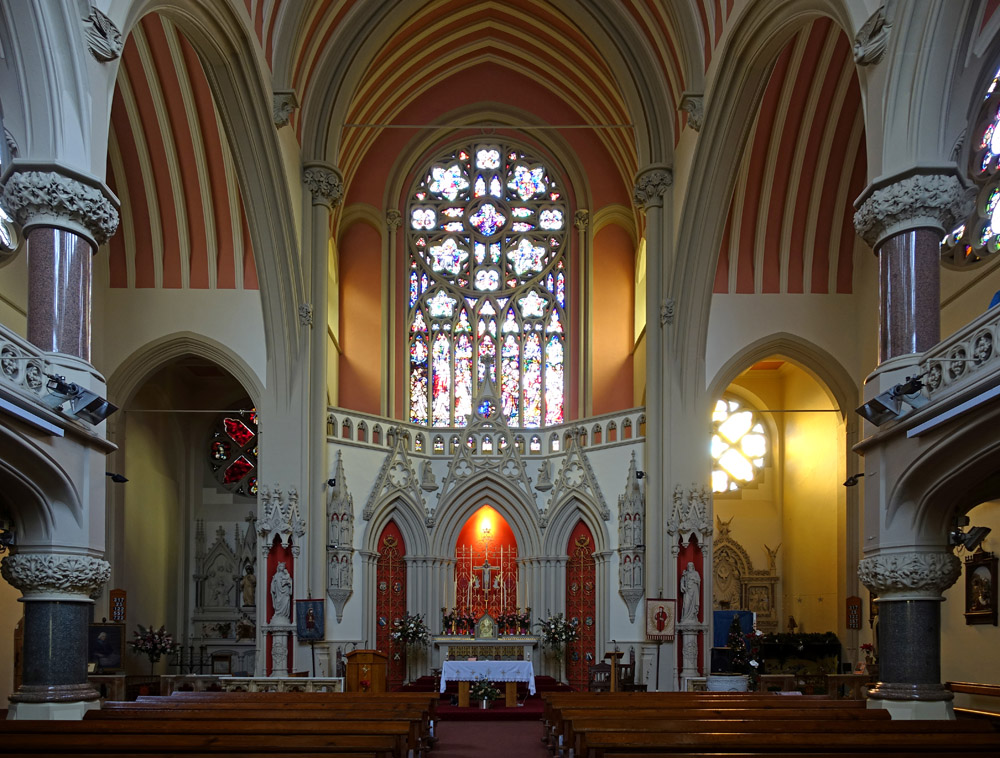
Interior

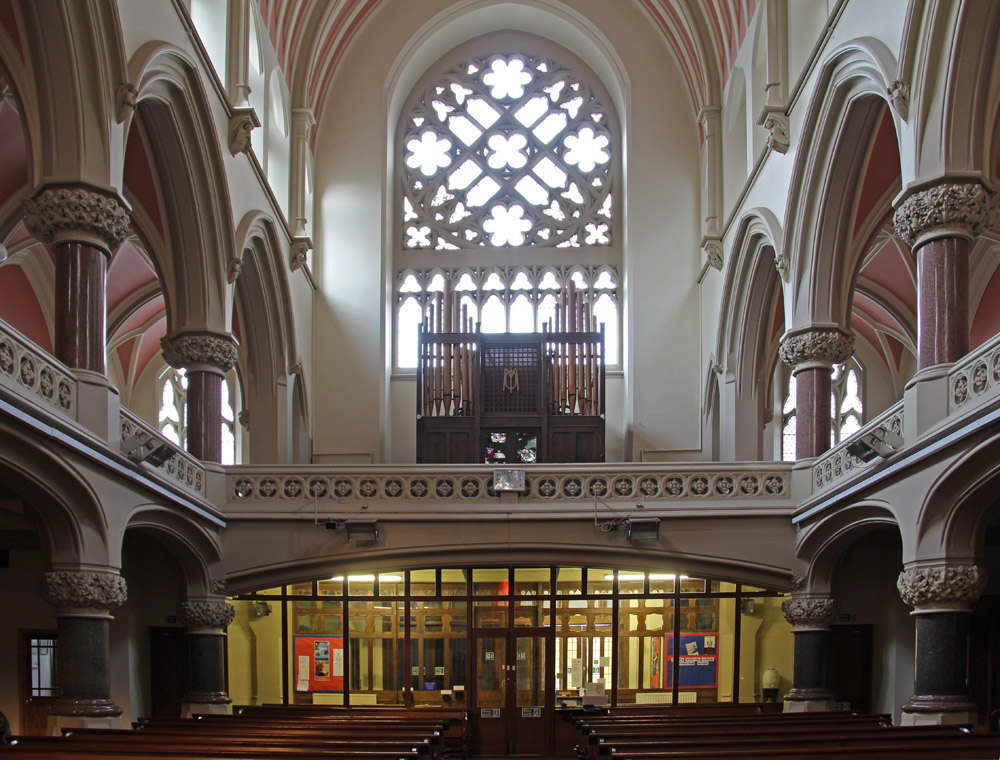
Organ

== See also ==
- Archdiocese of Westminster
