= Pugin & Pugin =

British architectural firm

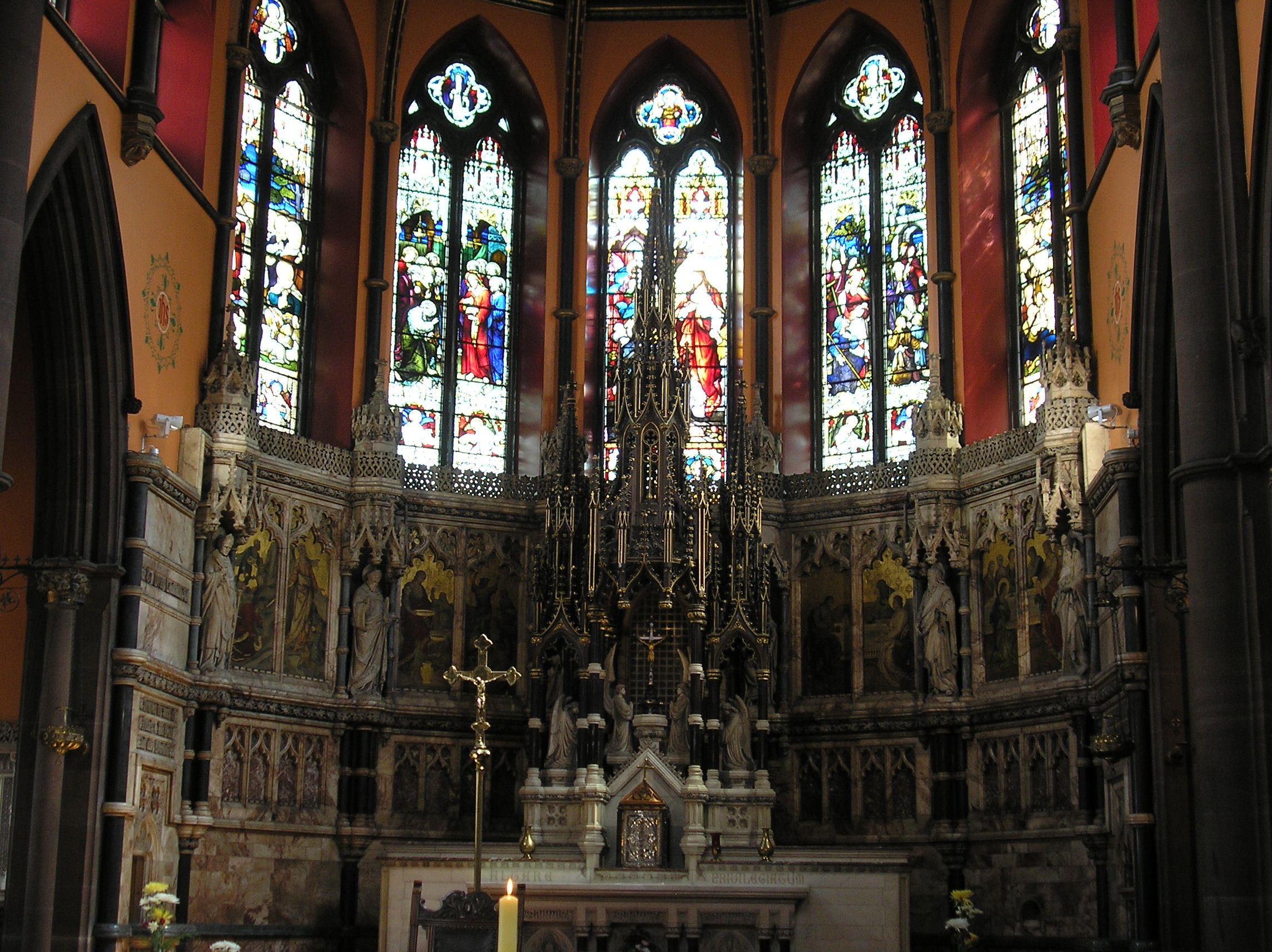
Sanctuary of the Sacred Heart Church, Liverpool, England, designed in the 1890s

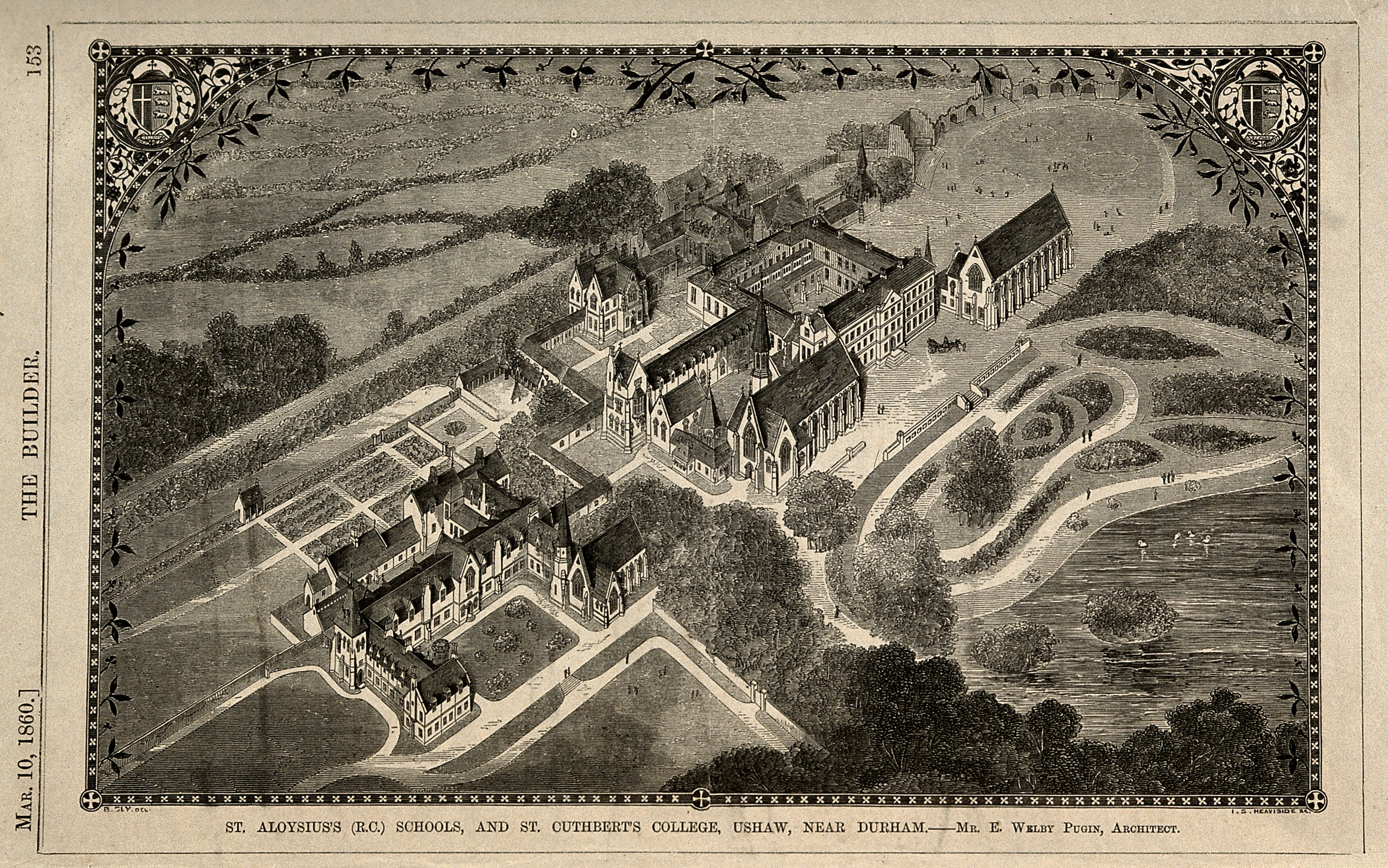
St. Aloysius's Schools and St. Cuthbert College, Ushaw, near Durham. Architect E. Welby Pugin.

Pugin & Pugin (fl. c.1873–c.1958) was a London-based family firm of church architects.

== History ==
The origins of the Pugin & Pugin firm lay with the practice of Edward Welby Pugin (1834–1875); he had worked in the London office of his father Augustus, who died in 1852 when Edward was eighteen.

After Edward Pugin was bankrupted by a business venture in 1873, the firm's work in England and Scotland was continued by his brother Cuthbert Welby Pugin (1840–1928) and half-brother Peter Paul Pugin (1851–1904), and the name of the practice became Pugin & Pugin.

== Buildings ==
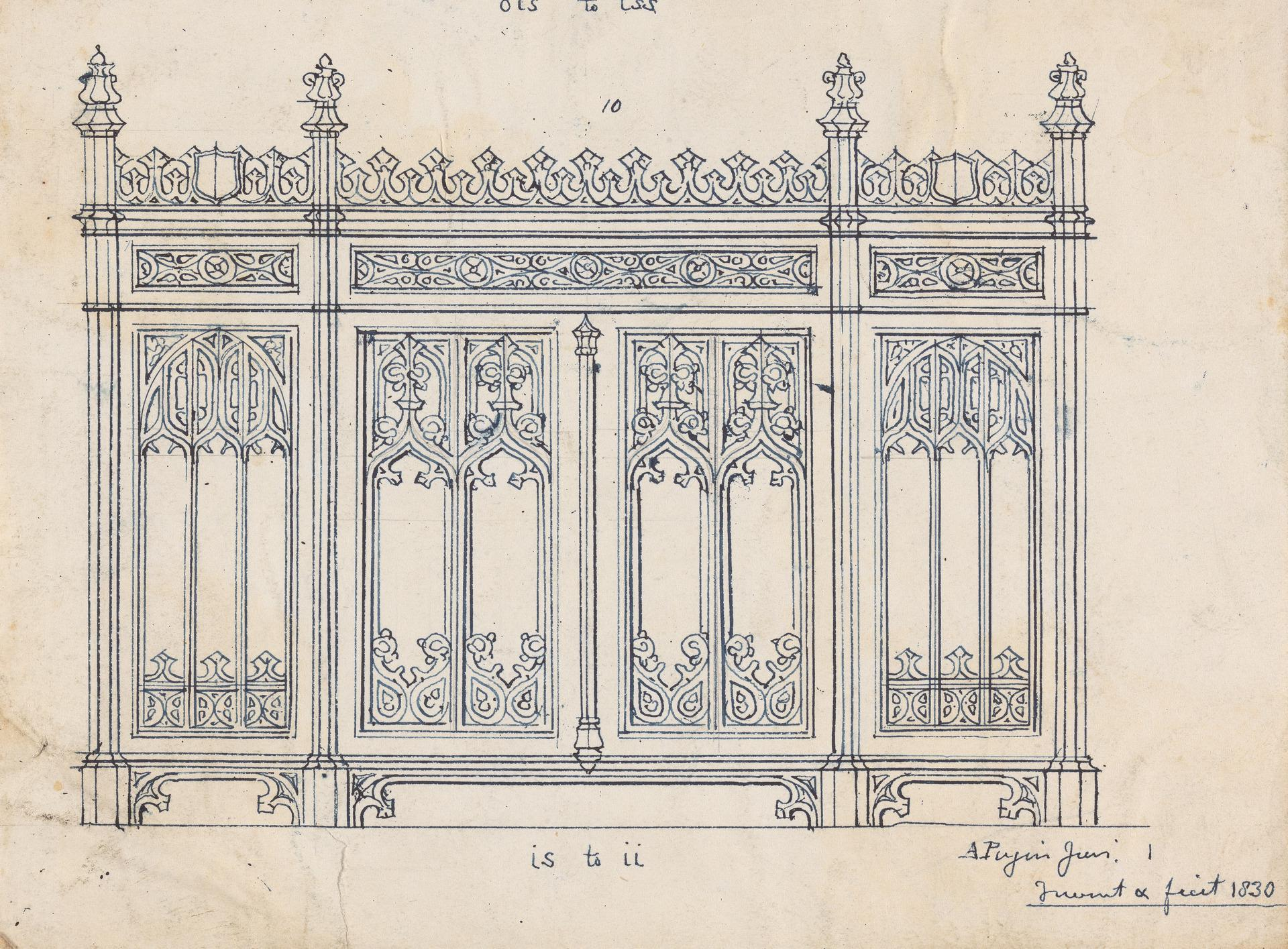
Augustus Pugin's design for a Gothic screen

The firm worked exclusively in the Gothic Revival style, and produced many buildings, alterations and furnishings for the Catholic Church, such as the sanctuary of the Sacred Heart Church, Liverpool; Sacred Heart Church, Kilburn; English Martyrs Church, Tower Hill; St Mary's Church, Morecambe; the presbytery of the Sacred Heart Church in Bridgeton, Glasgow, Scotland; and St Mary's Church in Stirling.

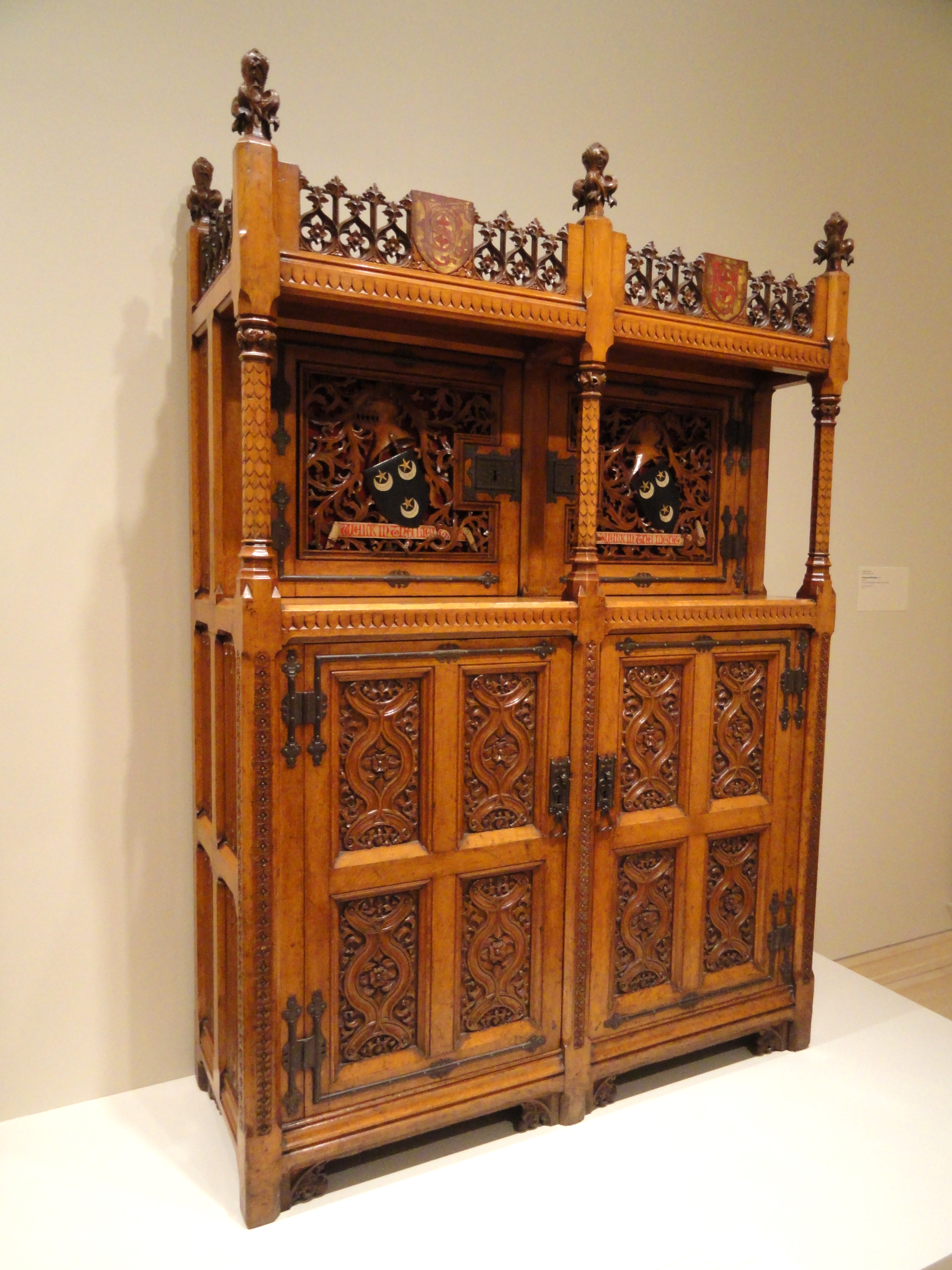
Cabinet by Augustus Welby Northmore Pugin

The firm designed the high altar of the church of St John Cantius and St Nicholas Catholic Church in Broxburn, West Lothian in Caen stone and marble.

There are reputedly about a hundred buildings by the firm in Australasia, built from the mid-1850s onwards, for the Roman Catholic Church. All but one are in Australia; the singular example in New Zealand is the 1894 Bishop's Palace in Saint Mary's Bay, Auckland, commissioned by Dom John Edmund Luck (1840–1896), Bishop of Auckland.
