= Sacred Heart Church, Liverpool =

Coordinates: 53.4104°N 2.9620°W

Sacred Heart Church
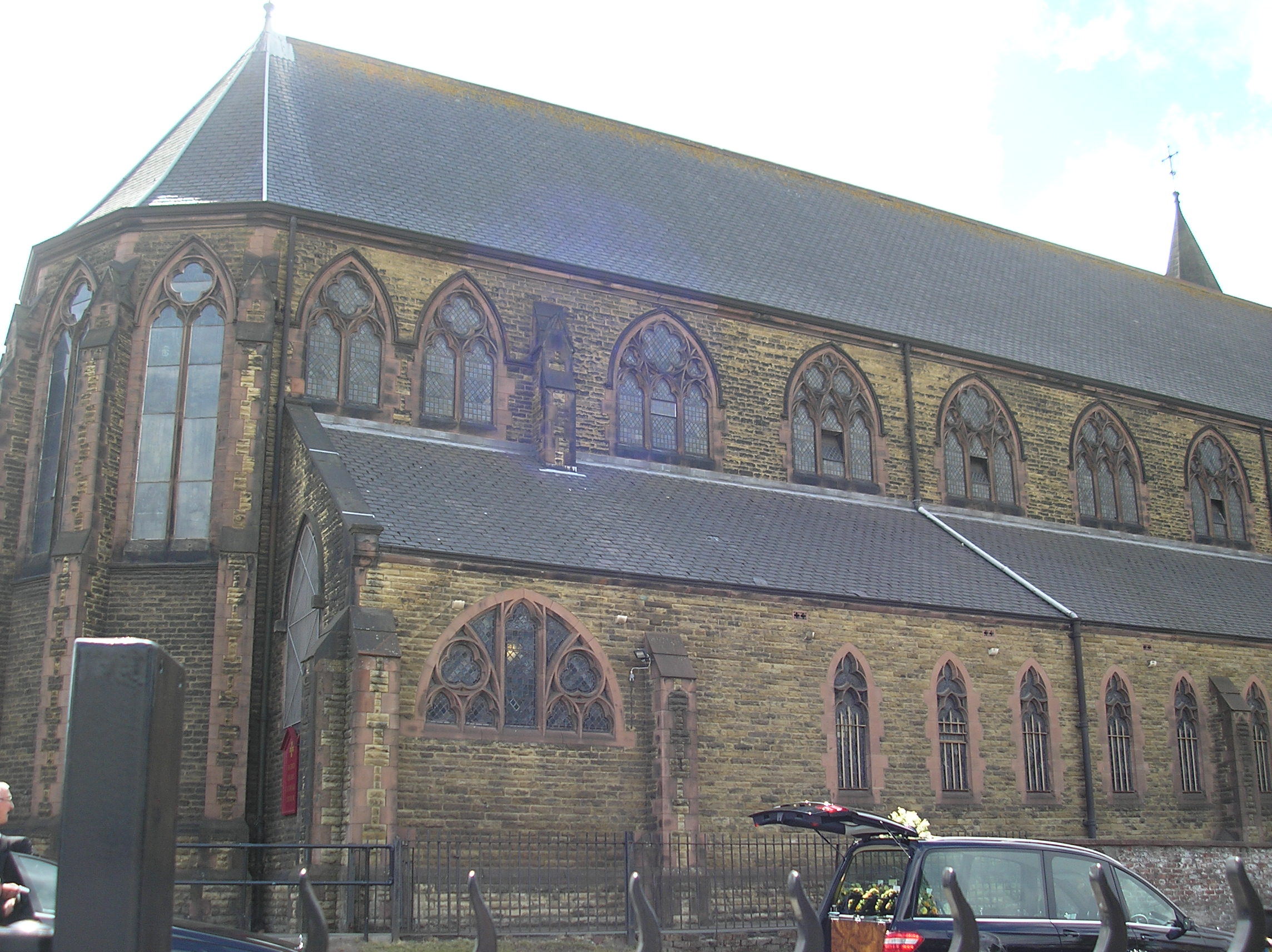
- Exterior

- Location in Liverpool
- OS grid reference: SJ 36148 90831
- Location: Liverpool
- Country: England
- Denomination: Roman Catholic

History
- Status: Active
- Dedication: Sacred Heart

Architecture
- Functional status: Parish church
- Heritage designation: Grade II listed
- Designated: 31 October 1989
- Architect: Goldie, Child & Goldie
- Style: Gothic Revival
- Completed: 1886

Administration
- Archdiocese: Liverpool
- Deanery: Liverpool North
- Parish: St Michael & Sacred Heart

Sacred Heart Church is a Roman Catholic church in the centre of Liverpool, England, on the corner of Low Hill and the A57 next to the Royal Liverpool University Hospital. It is a Grade II listed building and was opened in 1886. It was designed by Goldie, Child & Goldie and has an altar piece by Pugin and Pugin.

== History ==
Originally, the Catholics in the area prayed in the chapel of a nearby convent on Mount Vernon Street. With the Catholic population expanding, plans were drawn up for the construction of a church that would accommodate the increasing numbers. It was opened in 1886 and the core elements of the church, such as the nave and exterior, were designed by the architectural firm of George Goldie, Goldie, Child & Goldie Ltd. However two other firms also did work for the church. Augustus Pugin's firm, Pugin & Pugin, designed the sanctuary in the 1890s. Also, Sinnott, Powell & Sinnott, who also designed Our Lady Star of the Sea Church in Seaforth, Merseyside built the church hall in 1894.

There was originally an entrance to the church from Mount Vernon Street, but with the construction of the Royal Liverpool University Hospital, the road became a private access for the hospital, and the entrance was blocked off. The main entrance is now on the other side of the church, along Low Hill.

== Parish ==
After 2000, the parish was merged with the nearby St. Michael's Church to become the parish of St. Michael and the Sacred Heart.

The church has a close relationship with the nearby Sacred Heart Catholic Primary School, with the school frequently doing trips to the church and Liverpool Metropolitan Cathedral.

With the high concentration of Catholic churches in the area, Sacred Heart has its Sunday Mass at a time not to conflict with the other churches, such as St Francis Xavier Church. Its Mass for Sunday is on Saturday evening at 6:30 pm. St. Michael's church, in the parish, has its Sunday Mass at 10:30 am.

== Gallery ==
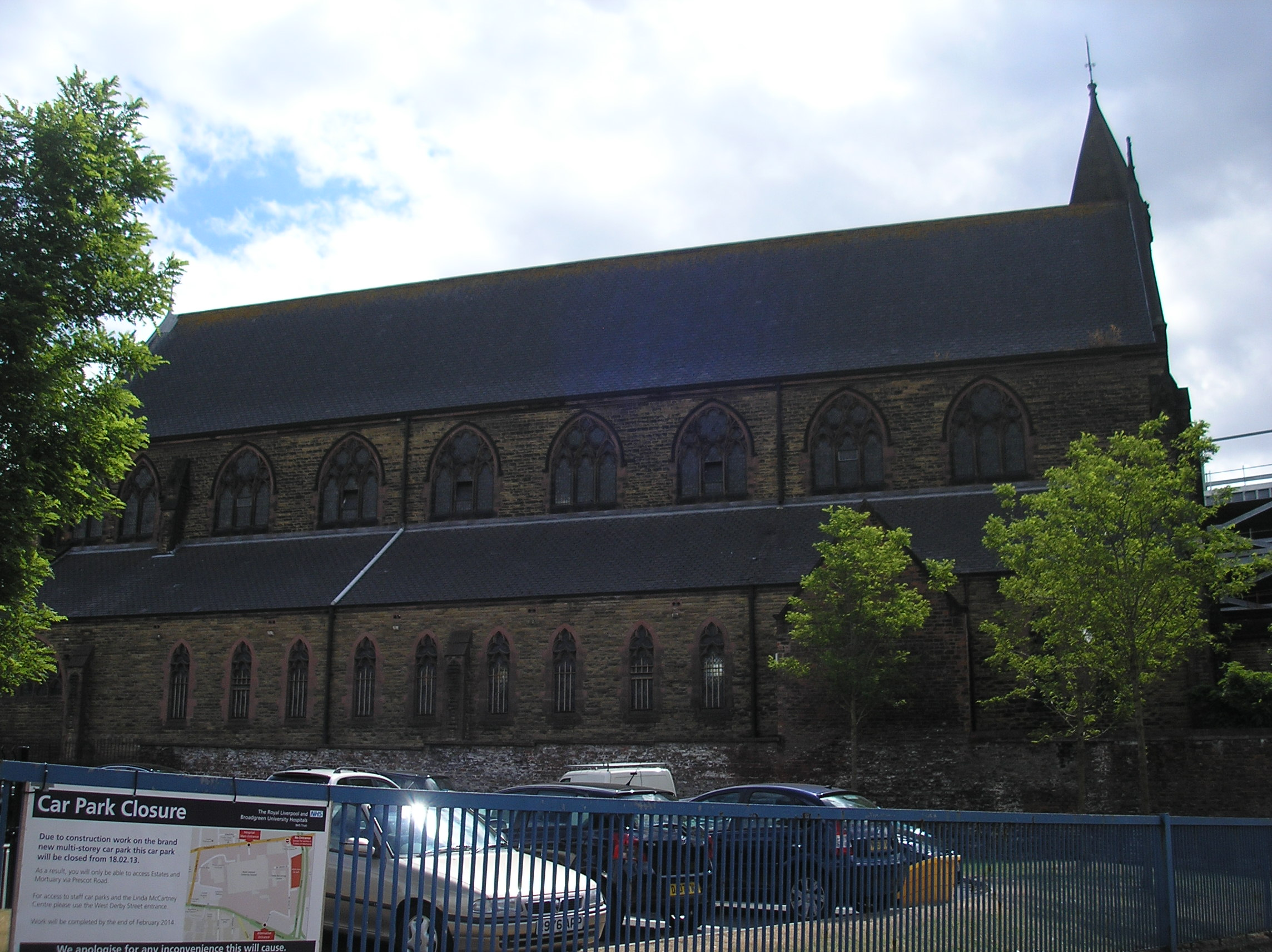
Side view of church

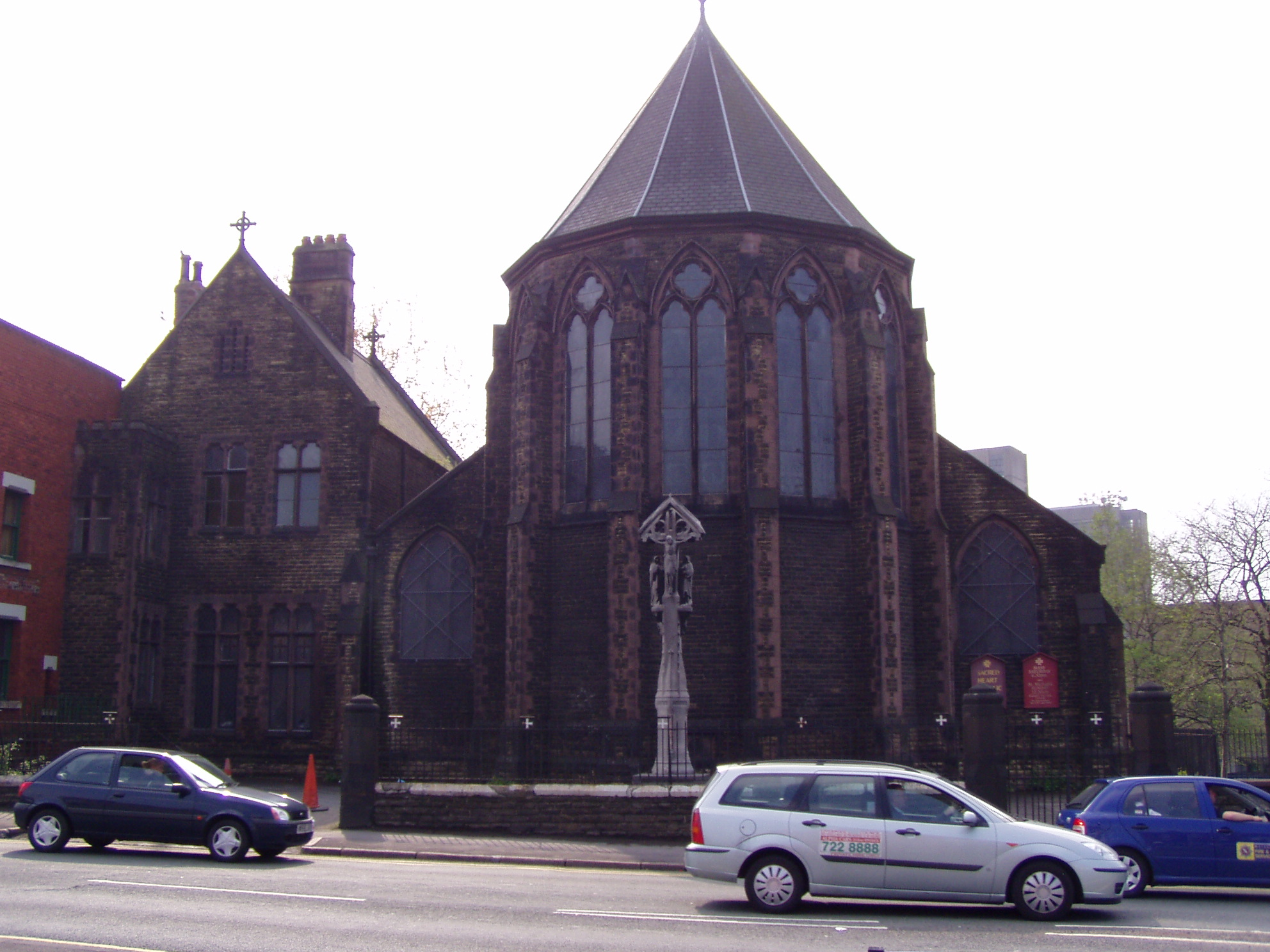
Calvary Cross

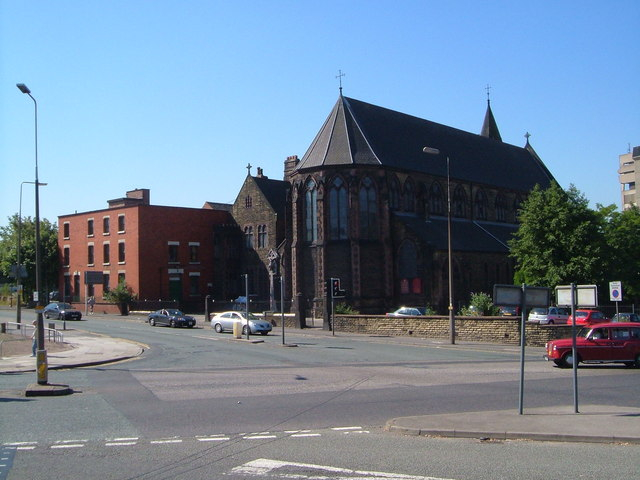
View across Low Hill

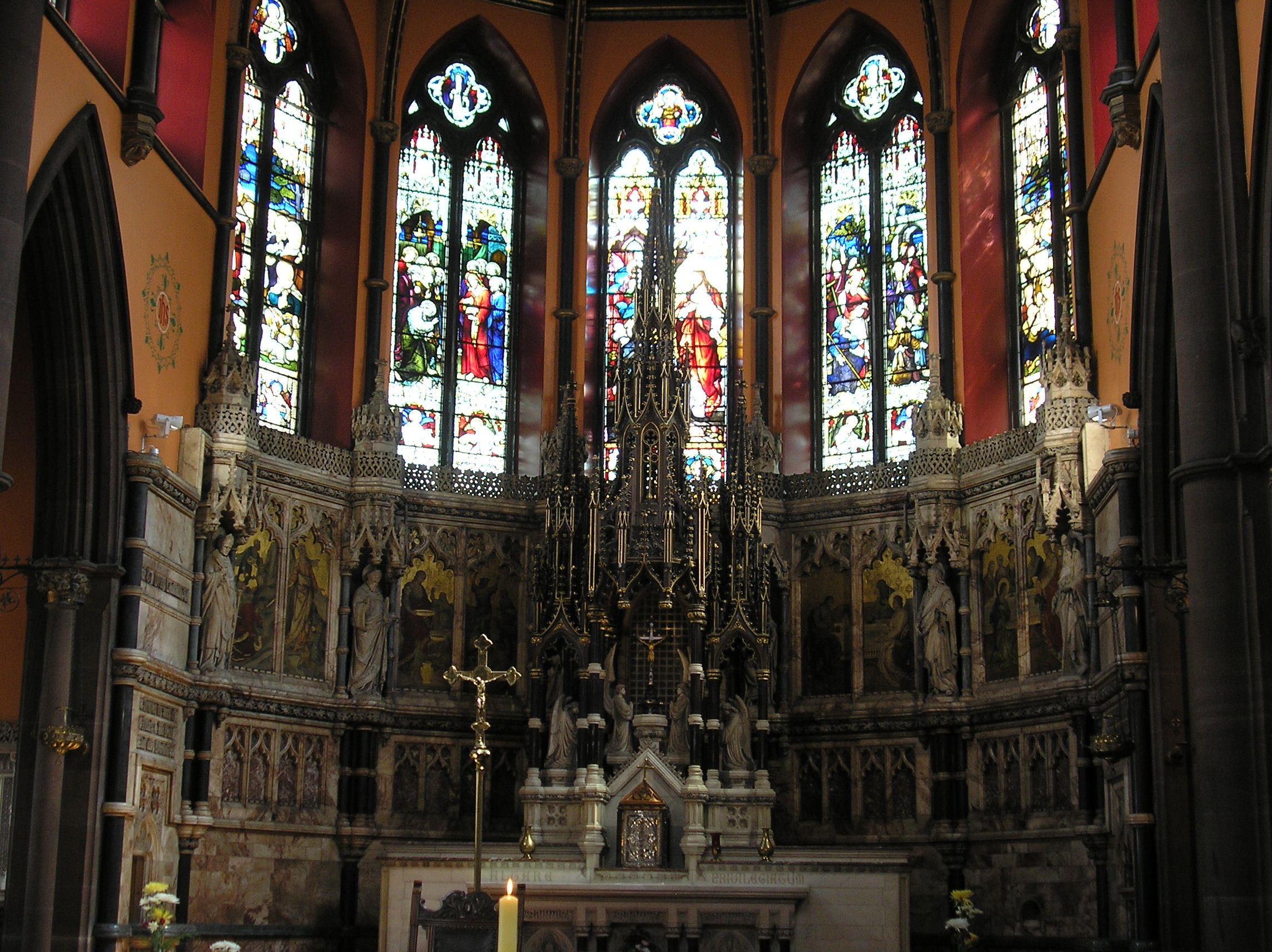
Sanctuary by Pugin & Pugin

== See also ==
- Archdiocese of Liverpool
- Church of Saint Francis Xavier, Liverpool
