= St Paul's Church, Dover =

Coordinates: 51.12862°N 1.3137°E

St Paul's Church
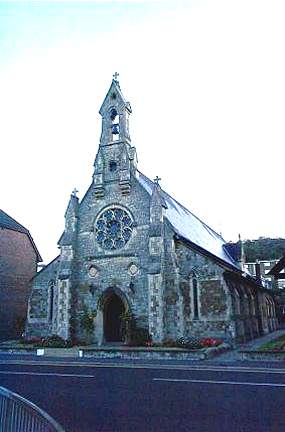
- Front entrance

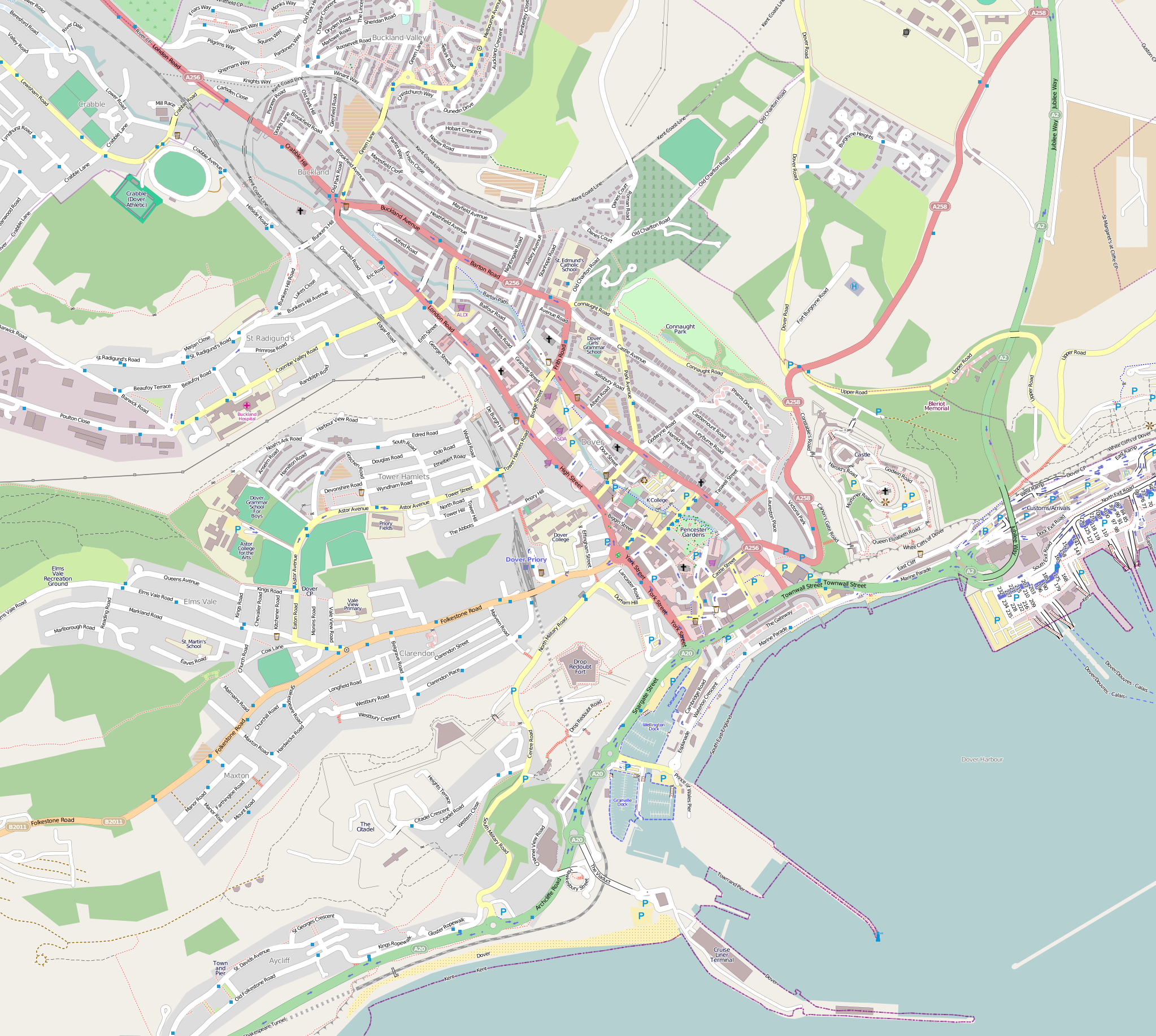
- Location in Dover
- OS grid reference: TR 31951 41814
- Location: Dover, Kent
- Country: England
- Denomination: Roman Catholic
- Website: ParishoftheGoodShepherd.co.uk

History
- Status: Parish church
- Dedication: Saint Paul

Architecture
- Functional status: Active
- Architect: E. W. Pugin
- Style: Gothic Revival
- Groundbreaking: 1867
- Completed: 15 May 1868
- Construction cost: £2300

Administration
- Province: Southwark
- Archdiocese: Southwark
- Deanery: Dover
- Parish: Good Shepherd

St Paul's Church is a Roman Catholic church in Dover, Kent, England. It was built from 1867 to 1868. It is situated on Maison Dieu Road, north of Pencester Gardens in the centre of the town. It is a Gothic Revival church designed by E.W. Pugin.

== History ==
=== Origin ===
In 1822, a mission started in the town that ministered to Catholics in the area and Mass was said in a house, 45 Snargate Street.

In 1834, a location had to be bought, because Mass was being said in the loft of a house on St James' Street, and it was not large to hold everybody there. A former Wesleyan chapel in Elizabeth Street was bought for the Catholics to worship in. It was bought for £425 and it cost £400 to renovate. A further £350 was paid for an adjacent presbytery. In May 1935, new chapel was opened. Yet, less than 30 years later, with the increasing population in the area, a new site needed to be found to accommodate the larger Catholic congregation.

=== Construction ===
In 1864, the present site on Maison Dieu Road was bought for £450. In 1867, construction of the church began. Construction of the church started in 1867 and cost £2300. Much of the money for the new building came from an endowment from the estate of Mary Winifred St Martin, Countess de Front (died 1830). She was the wife of Philip St Martin, Count de Front (died 1812), an ambassador of the Kingdom of Sardinia to the Court of St James's. On 15 May 1868, Thomas Grant the Bishop of Southwark opened the church.

In 1872, a school was built next to the church and a year later, in 1873, an apse was added to the church.

=== Developments ===
In 1959, the church was repaired. This was done by lowering the chancel and bringing forward the altar, closer to the nave of the church. In 1964, the nave was renovated, new pews were added and the pulpit was removed.

On 23 October 1987, an arsonist set fire to the church. The fire destroyed the church roof and organ. After setting fire to the church, the arsonist went to Canterbury to rob St Thomas of Canterbury Church there. A few days later, he was arrested by the police.

Repair work to the church started on 1 June 1988 and on 28 October the church was reopened. Mass was celebrated that day by the Archbishop of Southwark, Michael Bowen.

== Parish ==
Very close to the church is St Edmund's Chapel, it was built in 1262, but was dissolved in 1544. In the 1960s, efforts were made to restore it, achieved primarily through the efforts of Fr Terrence Tanner, parish priest of St Paul's Church from 1958 to 1970. The chapel is owned by The St Edmund of Abingdon Memorial Trust.

In 2015, together with St Finbarr's Church in Aylesham, the church became part of the parish of the Good Shepherd.

St Paul's Church has two Sunday Masses, they are at 6:00pm on Saturday and 9:15am on Sunday.

== See also ==
- Roman Catholic Archdiocese of Southwark
