= Sacred Heart Church, Kilburn =

Sacred Heart Church
- Church of the Sacred Heart of Jesus
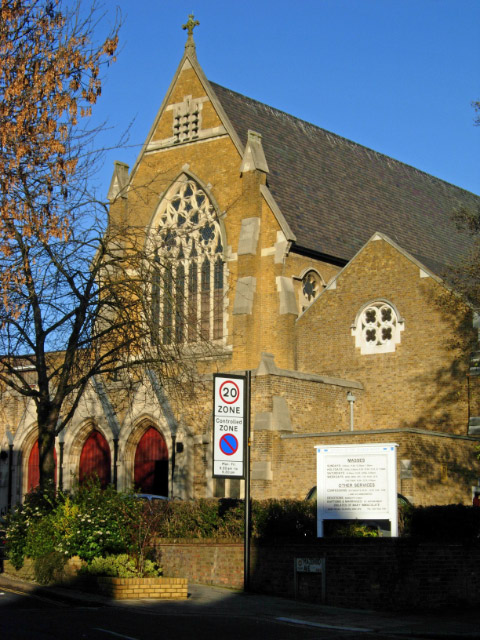
- Sacred Heart Church
- 51.54071°N 0.19392°W
- Location: Kilburn, London
- Country: England
- Denomination: Roman Catholic
- Religious institute: Oblates of Mary Immaculate
- Website: Parish.RCDoW.org.uk/Kilburn

History
- Founded: 1865
- Dedication: Sacred Heart

Architecture
- Architect(s): E. W. Pugin, Pugin & Pugin
- Style: Gothic Revival
- Groundbreaking: 1877
- Completed: 1899

Administration
- Archdiocese: Westminster
- Deanery: Camden
- Parish: Kilburn

Sacred Heart Church or the Church of the Sacred Heart of Jesus is a Roman Catholic parish church in Kilburn, London. It was designed by E. W. Pugin and built after his death by his brothers Pugin & Pugin in two stages, in 1879 and from 1898 to 1899. It is located on the corner Quex Road and Mazenod Road, next to St Eugene de Mazenod Primary School. It was founded by the Missionary Oblates of Mary Immaculate who continue to serve the parish.

== History ==
=== Foundation ===
Sacred Heart Church and English Martyrs Church in Tower Hill were both founded and built in parallel by the Missionary Oblates of Mary Immaculate. In 1865, the Oblates came to London, invited by Cardinal Nicholas Wiseman, and started working in Kilburn and Tower Hill. Soon after their arrival in Kilburn, the Oblates built a temporary church. In 1866, a site was bought for a permanent church. Before his death in 1875, E. W. Pugin made the designs for the church.

=== Construction ===
Building work started after 1875. Construction work was overseen by E. W. Pugin's brothers Cuthbert Welby Pugin and Peter Paul Pugin, in partnership with George Ashlin. By 1879, the nave was finished. By 1899, two bays to the east of the church, the sanctuary and side chapels were added. As the parish had a high Catholic population further extensions were needed to accommodate the congregation. In 1959, the front porch was added. In 1964, the church was enlarged. The south aisle was widened, transepts were added where the sanctuary used to be, and a new sanctuary was added with a new high altar installed in memory of John F. Kennedy. After the Second Vatican Council, a panel by Arthur Fleischmann depicting the Last Supper was added.

=== West Kilburn ===
In the middle of the 20th-century, with the large size of the local Catholic community, it was decided that a new local church was needed. In 1948, a former Methodist chapel, originally built around 1880, was bought in West Kilburn. It became the Immaculate Heart of Mary Church. It was originally served by the Oblates from Sacred Heart Church. It is now a parish church and remains with the Oblates.

== Parish ==
At the Sacred Heart Church, Sunday Masses at 6:00pm on Saturday, and at 10:00am, 12:00pm and 6:00pm on Sunday. There is a weekday Mass at 10:00am from Monday to Saturday. Confession on Saturday at 10:30–11:00am and 5:30–6:00pm

== See also ==
- Archdiocese of Westminster
