= St Peter's Church, Rock Ferry =

Coordinates: 53.3694°N 3.0020°W

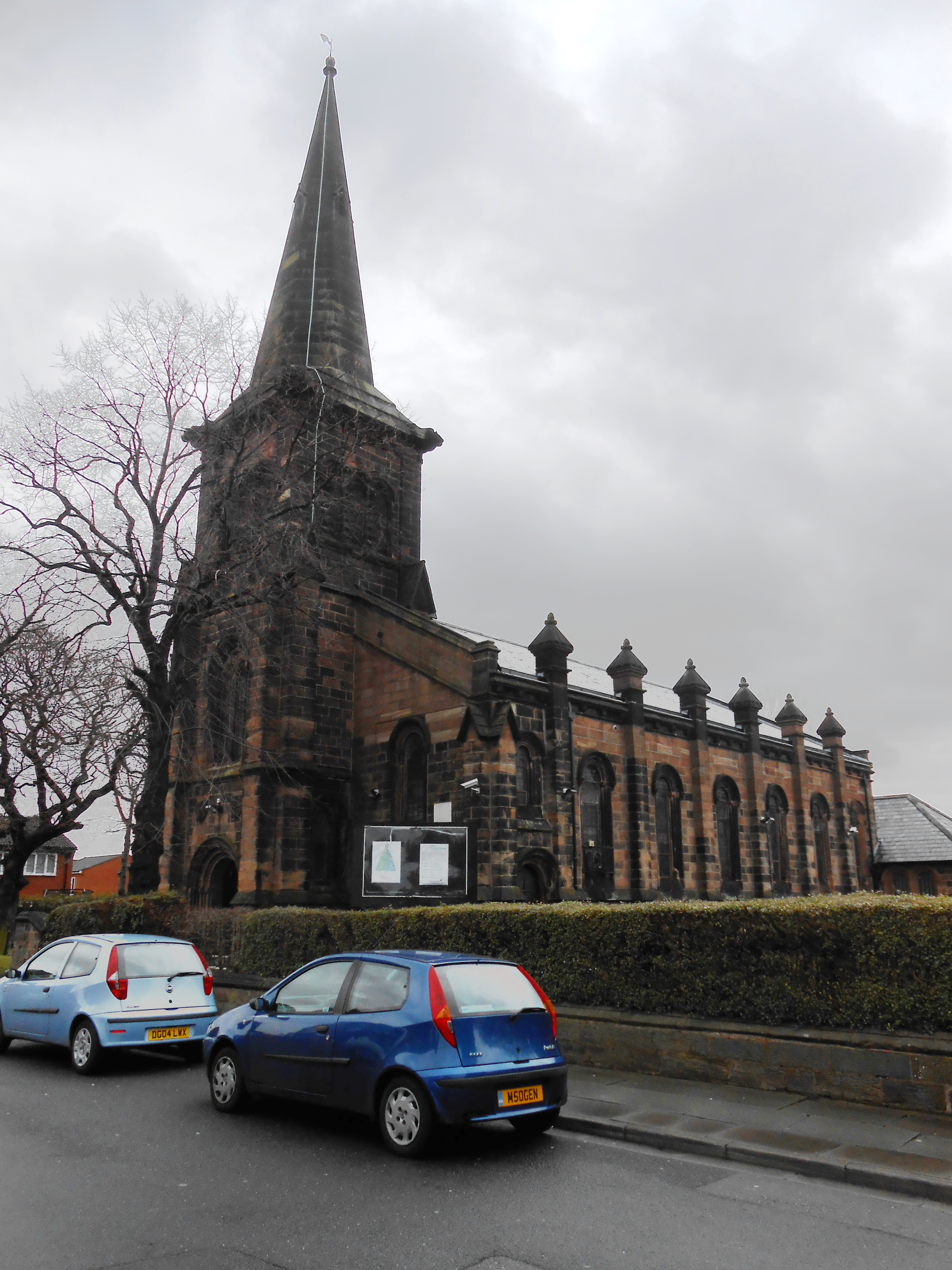
- St Peter's Church, Rock Ferry, from the southwest

- Location in Merseyside
- OS grid reference: SJ 334 863
- Location: St Peter's Road, Rock Ferry, Birkenhead, Wirral, Merseyside
- Country: England
- Denomination: Church of England
- Churchmanship: Evangelical
- Website: St Peter, Rock Ferry

History
- Status: Parish church
- Dedication: Saint Peter

Architecture
- Functional status: Active
- Heritage designation: Grade II
- Designated: 28 March 1974
- Architect(s): Hurst and Moffatt
- Architectural type: Church
- Style: Neo-Norman, Gothic Revival
- Groundbreaking: 1841
- Completed: c. 1884

Specifications
- Materials: Sandstone, slate roofs

Administration
- Province: York
- Diocese: Chester
- Archdeaconry: Chester
- Deanery: Birkenhead
- Parish: St Peter, Rock Ferry

Clergy
- Vicar: Revd John Naude

St Peter's Church is in St Peter's Road, Rock Ferry, Birkenhead, Wirral, Merseyside, England. It is an active Anglican parish church in the deanery of Birkenhead, the archdeaconry of Chester, and the diocese of Chester. The church is designated by English Heritage as a Grade II listed building.

== History ==
St Peter's was built between 1841 and 1842, and designed by Hurst and Moffatt. The chancel was added in about 1884. The church was badly damaged by bombs during the Second World War. It was repaired, but did not re-open until 1958.

== Architecture ==
=== Exterior ===
The church is constructed in sandstone with slate roofs. The nave and steeple are in a variation of the Neo-Norman style, and the chancel is Gothic Revival. The plan consists of a six-bay nave, a chancel with a north organ chamber and a south vestry, and a west tower with a spire. The tower is in three stages with clasping buttresses and a west door. Above the door is a pair of round-headed windows under a segmental arch. In the top stage are triple bell openings. The cornice at the top of the tower has corner corbels carved with winged beasts. On the tower is a broach spire with lucarnes. Along the sides of the nave the bays are divided by square pilaster buttresses rising to fluted finials. (Note: In the Buildings of England series these are described as "like cottage loaves".) The windows are round-headed. On the sides of the chancel are two-light Decorated windows, and the east window consists of triple stepped lancets.

=== Interior ===
The interior of the church was refurbished after the war damage. A ceiling was added, and the interior was subdivided. The octagonal font of 1853 is panelled. The choir stalls and panelling in the chancel are dated 1884 and 1923. The stained glass in the east window dates from 1958 and depicts saints; it is by William Morris of Westminster. The church had a pipe organ built by Henry Willis which originally had two manuals, to which and a choir section was added later by H. Ainscough. It was damaged in the war and replaced in the 1950s with an organ by Nicholson and Lord of Walsall. There is a ring of six bells, all of which were re-cast in 1914 by John Taylor & Co.

== See also ==
- Listed buildings in Rock Ferry

== Notes and references ==
Notes

Citations
