= Our Lady and St Michael's Church, Workington =

Our Lady and St Michael's Church
- Our Lady Star of the Sea and St Michael's Church
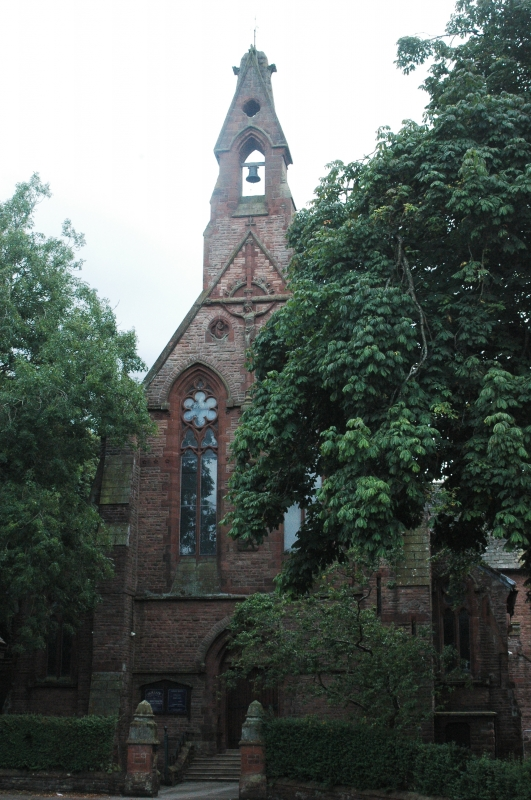
- Our Lady and St Michael's Church
- 54.6395°N 3.543°W
- OS grid reference: NY 00511 28248
- Location: Workington
- Country: England
- Denomination: Roman Catholic
- Website: Official website

History
- Status: Parish church
- Founded: 1810
- Founder: Benedictines
- Dedication: Our Lady, Star of the Sea, Saint Michael

Architecture
- Functional status: Active
- Heritage designation: Grade II listed
- Designated: 19 March 1997
- Architect: E. W. Pugin
- Style: Gothic Revival
- Completed: 1876

Administration
- Province: Liverpool
- Diocese: Lancaster
- Deanery: West Cumbria & Carlisle
- Parish: Good Shepherd, Workington

Our Lady and St Michael's Church also known as Our Lady Star of the Sea and St Michael's Church is a Roman Catholic Parish church in Workington, Cumbria, England. It was built in 1876 by the Benedictines. It is located on Bank Road and Banklands to the south west of the town centre. It was designed by E. W. Pugin in the Gothic Revival style and is a Grade II listed building.

== History ==
=== Foundation ===
In 1810, Benedictines from Ampleforth Abbey who were working in Whitehaven started a mission in Workington. In 1814, John Christian Curwen from Workington Hall gave a piece of land to the Benedictines for a priory and chapel to be built on.

=== Construction ===
With the chapel being too small to accommodate the increasing local Catholic population, a new church needed to be built. The church was built next to the priory. It was finished in 1876 and designed by E. W. Pugin in the Gothic Revival style. The old chapel became the parish hall, which now is part of St Joseph's Catholic High School, Workington. In the church, the high altar and the statue of Our Lady and the Sacred Heart are made from Caen stone. In 1882, statues from Jervaulx Abbey were installed in the Lady Chapel. From 1876 to the 1930s the stained glass were installed in the church and were made by Hardman & Co. and Frances Barnett of Leith. In 1906, the organ was installed, it is a Grade II pipe organ by William Hill & Sons. In 2019, the church was added to the Heritage at Risk Register by Historic England. Efforts are being made by the congregation to raise funds to repair the church.

=== Developments ===
With the population of Workington increasing in the 20th century, missions from the church were started that became separates parishes. In 1964, a parish was created for the Westfield area of Workington. From 1966, Catholics met in a church hall there. In October 1982, a new church, St Gregory's Church was consecrated by the Auxiliary Bishop of Lancaster, Thomas Pearson. It was designed by the architectural firm Harry Walters & Livesey.

In 2009, the church was handed over by the Benedictine monks to the Diocese of Lancaster.

== Parish ==
On 8 April 2012 the parish of Christ the Good Shepherd, Workington was formed, comprising Our Lady and St Michael's Church, St Gregory's Church in Westfield and St Mary's Church in Harrington. Our Lady and St Michael's Church has two Sunday Masses at 10:30am and 6:00pm. St Gregory's Church has a Sunday Mass at 9:30am and St Mary's Church has its Sunday Mass at 6:00pm on Saturday.
