= Cuthbert Welby Pugin =

English architect and furniture maker (1840-1928)

- Born: 2 June 1840; Thanet District, Kent, England
- Died: 25 March 1928 (aged 87); The Grange, Ramsgate, England
- Occupation(s): Architect, furniture maker, businessman
- Employer: Pugin & Pugin
- Father: Augustus Pugin
- Relatives: Augustus Charles Pugin (grandfather), Edward Welby Pugin (brother), Peter Paul Pugin (half-brother)

Cuthbert Welby Pugin (2 June 1840 – 25 March 1928) was an English architect, furniture builder and businessman working in the gothic revival style.

== Life and career ==
He was the son of Augustus Pugin and his second wife, Louisa Burton (or Button), making him Pugin's fourth child and second son. He was the brother of Edward Welby Pugin and half-brother of Peter Paul Pugin, who were both architects.

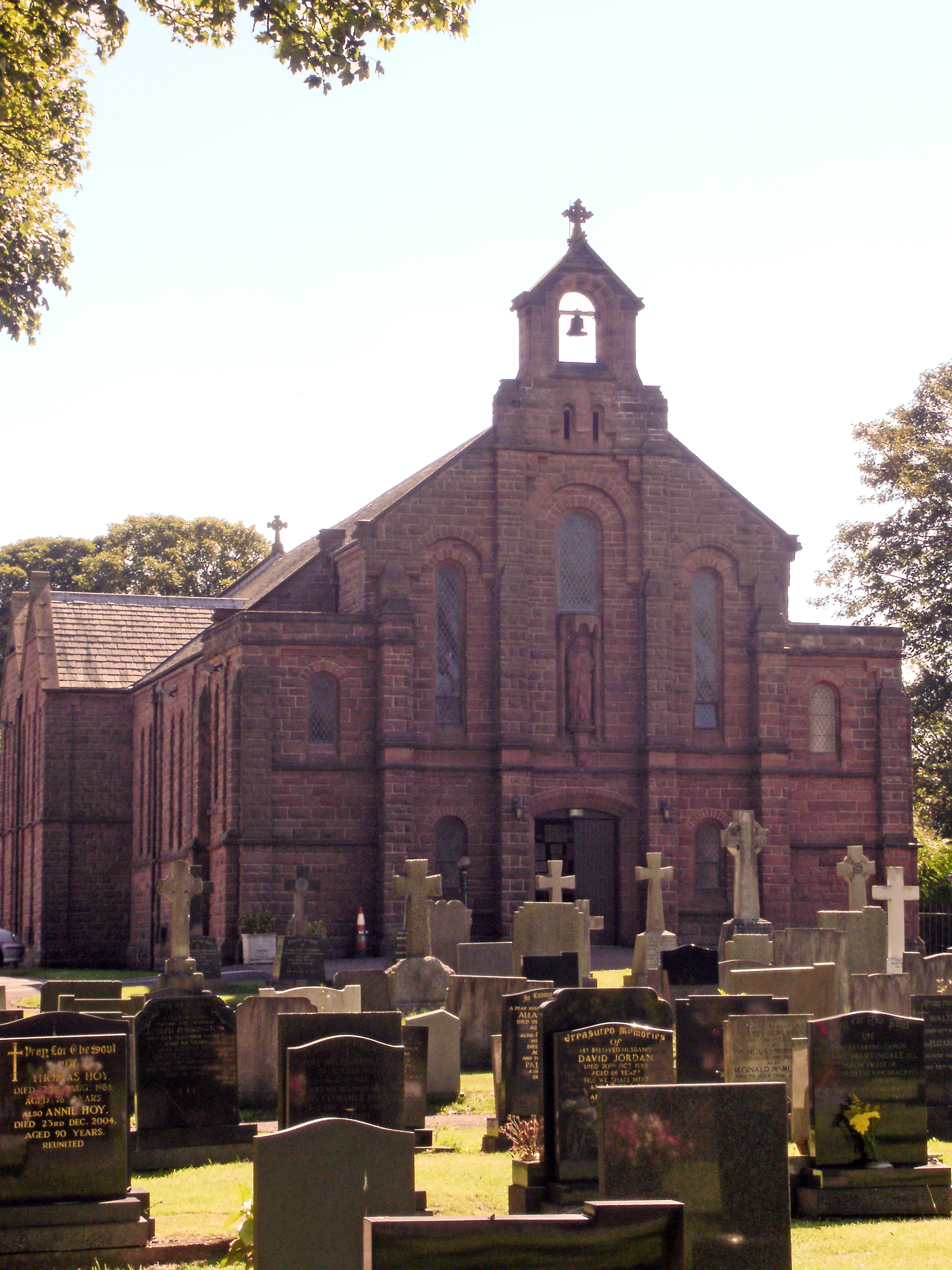
St John's Church, Poulton-le-Fylde, Cuthbert Pugin architect

He is most notable for his design of St John the Evangelist, Poulton-le-Fylde and his collaborations with Peter Paul Pugin to complete St Anne's Church, Highfield Road, English Martyrs Church, Tower Hill and Sacred Heart Church, Kilburn to designs by Edward Welby Pugin. All three brothers also made additions and alterations to The Grange, Ramsgate, originally designed by their father.

In 1860, he became manager of the South East Furniture Company, founded by Edward to manufacture Edward's designs. He began assisting Edward in the 1860s, and he and Peter Paul took over the English and Scottish work of Pugin & Pugin in 1873, when Edward had to flee to the US to escape his creditors.

When Edward died in 1875, Peter Paul took over main responsibility for the firm, with Cuthbert focussing on its furniture-making and furnishing sides until 1880, when he withdrew to run the family's furniture workshops directly. He lived in retirement at The Grange in Ramsgate until his death there in 1928.

Cuthbert Welby Pugin never married. He lived in Ramsgate until his death on 25 March 1928; he was buried in the Pugin chantry at St Augustine's church there.
