= St Mary's Church, Stirling =

St Mary's Church
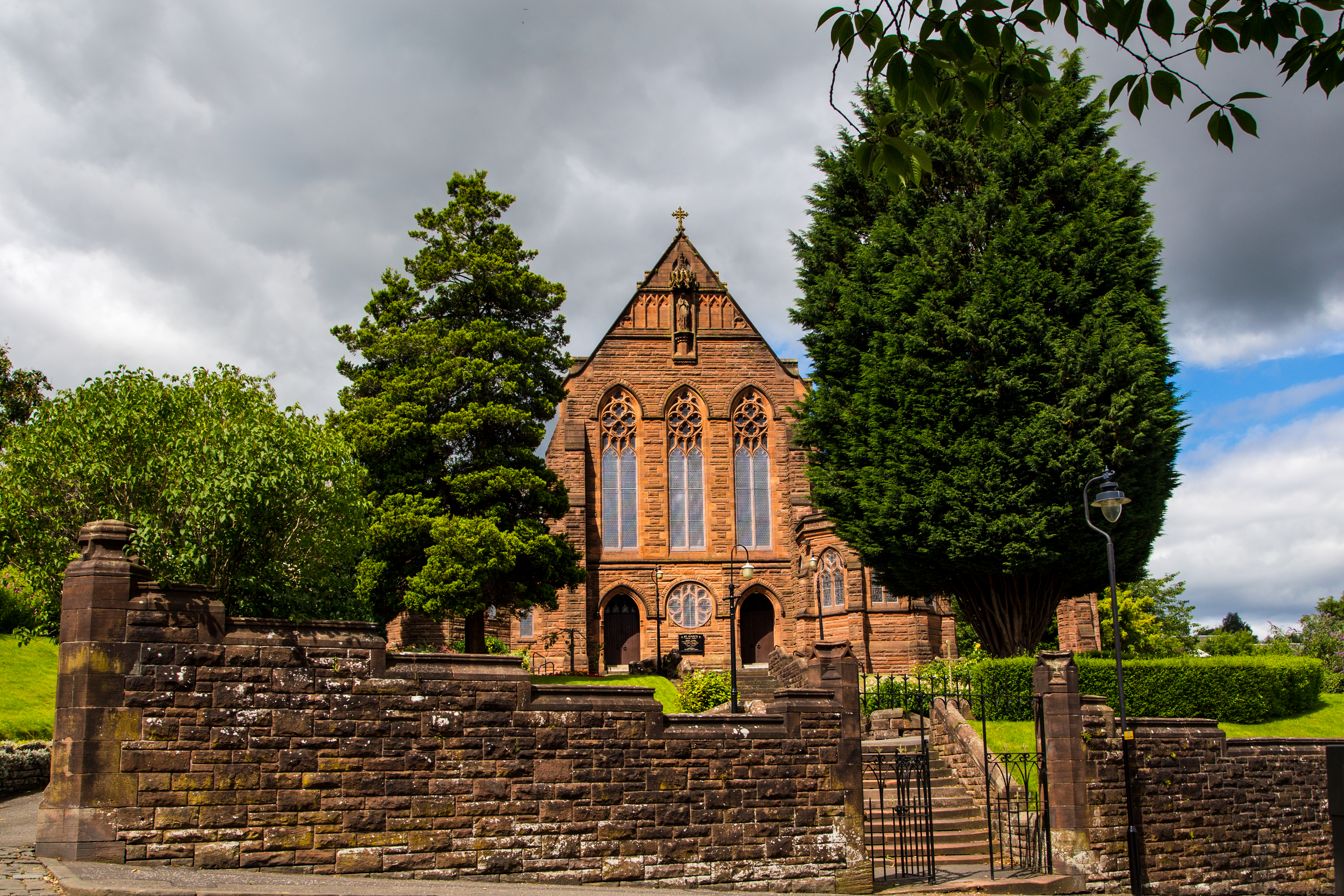
- St Mary's Church
- 56.1235°N 3.9424°W
- Location: Stirling
- Country: Scotland
- Denomination: Catholic
- Website: StirlingStMarys.org

History
- Status: Parish church
- Founded: 1838
- Dedication: Saint Mary

Architecture
- Functional status: Active
- Heritage designation: Category B
- Designated: 3 February 1978
- Architect: Peter Paul Pugin
- Style: Gothic Revival
- Groundbreaking: 4 May 1904
- Completed: 1905

Administration
- Province: St Andrews and Edinburgh
- Archdiocese: St Andrews and Edinburgh
- Deanery: Stirling
- Parish: St Mary's

St Mary's Church is a Roman Catholic parish church in Stirling, Scotland. It was built from 1904 to 1905 and designed by Peter Paul Pugin in the Gothic Revival style. It is located between Upper Bridge Street and Crofthead Road to the north of the city centre. It is a category B listed building.

== History ==
=== Foundation ===
In 1835, a plot of land on Irving Place was bought for the construction of a Catholic church. In 1836, construction work began. In 1838, the first Catholic church in Stirling since the Reformation was opened. It was the Church of the Most Holy Trinity.

=== Construction ===
Towards the end of the 1800s, the church was becoming too small to accommodate the increasing Catholic population in Stirling. On 4 May 1904, the foundation stone of the current church, St Mary's Church, was laid by the Archbishop of St Andrews and Edinburgh, James Smith. Construction of the church was partially paid for by Lady Agnes Murray of Polmaise Castle. The church was designed by Peter Paul Pugin in the Gothic Revival style. In 1905, the church was opened.

== Parish ==
St Mary's Church is in the same parish as Holy Spirit Church and St Margaret of Scotland Church in Stirling. St Mary's Church has two Sunday Masses at 5:30pm on Saturday and 10:15am on Sunday.

== See also ==
- Archdiocese of St Andrews and Edinburgh
