= Peter Paul Pugin =

English architect

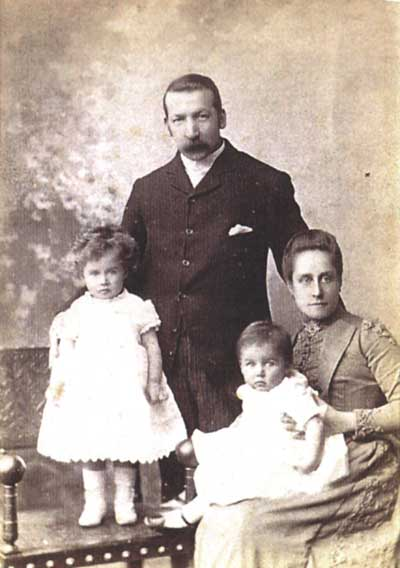
- Peter Paul Pugin, with his wife Agnes Bird and two of their children, c. early 1890s
- Born: 1851
- Died: March 1904; Bournemouth, Dorset, England
- Burial place: Ramsgate
- Occupation: architect
- Employer: Pugin & Pugin
- Style: Gothic
- Father: Augustus Pugin
- Relatives: Augustus Charles Pugin (grandfather), Edward Welby Pugin (half-brother), Cuthbert Welby Pugin (half-brother)
- Honours: Knight of the Order of St. Sylvester

Peter Paul Pugin (1851 – March 1904) was an English architect. He was the son of Augustus Pugin by his third wife, Jane Knill, and the half-brother of architect and designer Edward Welby Pugin.

== Life and career ==
Peter Paul Pugin was only a year old when his father died. He later began practice as the junior partner in Pugin & Pugin, the family architectural firm. The senior partner was his half-brother Edward Welby Pugin.

When Edward Welby Pugin died suddenly on 5 June 1875 as a result of overwork and 'injudicious use of chloral hydrate', the main responsibility for the practice passed to Peter Paul Pugin. Although Peter Paul's offices remained in London, England and Liverpool, England, his practice was largely Scottish, and he also maintained an office in Glasgow, Scotland.

Whereas Peter Paul's earlier churches were strongly influenced by his father and brother, by the 1880s, he had developed a recognisable curvilinear Gothic style, usually in red sandstone with elaborate altarpieces in coloured marbles. Apart from his own works, such as St Mary's Church, Stirling, Peter Paul Pugin completed several of the works of Edward Welby Pugin after the latter's death, in particular the Church of Our Lady Star of the Sea in Workington, Cumbria, Sacred Heart Church, Kilburn, London and English Martyrs Church, Tower Hill, London.

In 1886, Peter Paul Pugin married Agnes Bird, the third daughter of the Catholic builder John Bird of Hammersmith. They had five children, but none entered the practice. In 1889, Peter Paul Pugin was made a Knight of the Order of St. Sylvester, one of the Papal Orders of Chivalry.

Peter Paul died in Bournemouth in March 1904, the firm being continued by his nephew Sebastian Pugin Powell, born in 1886, the son of John Hardman Powell. Peter Paul Pugin was buried in Ramsgate.

== Works ==
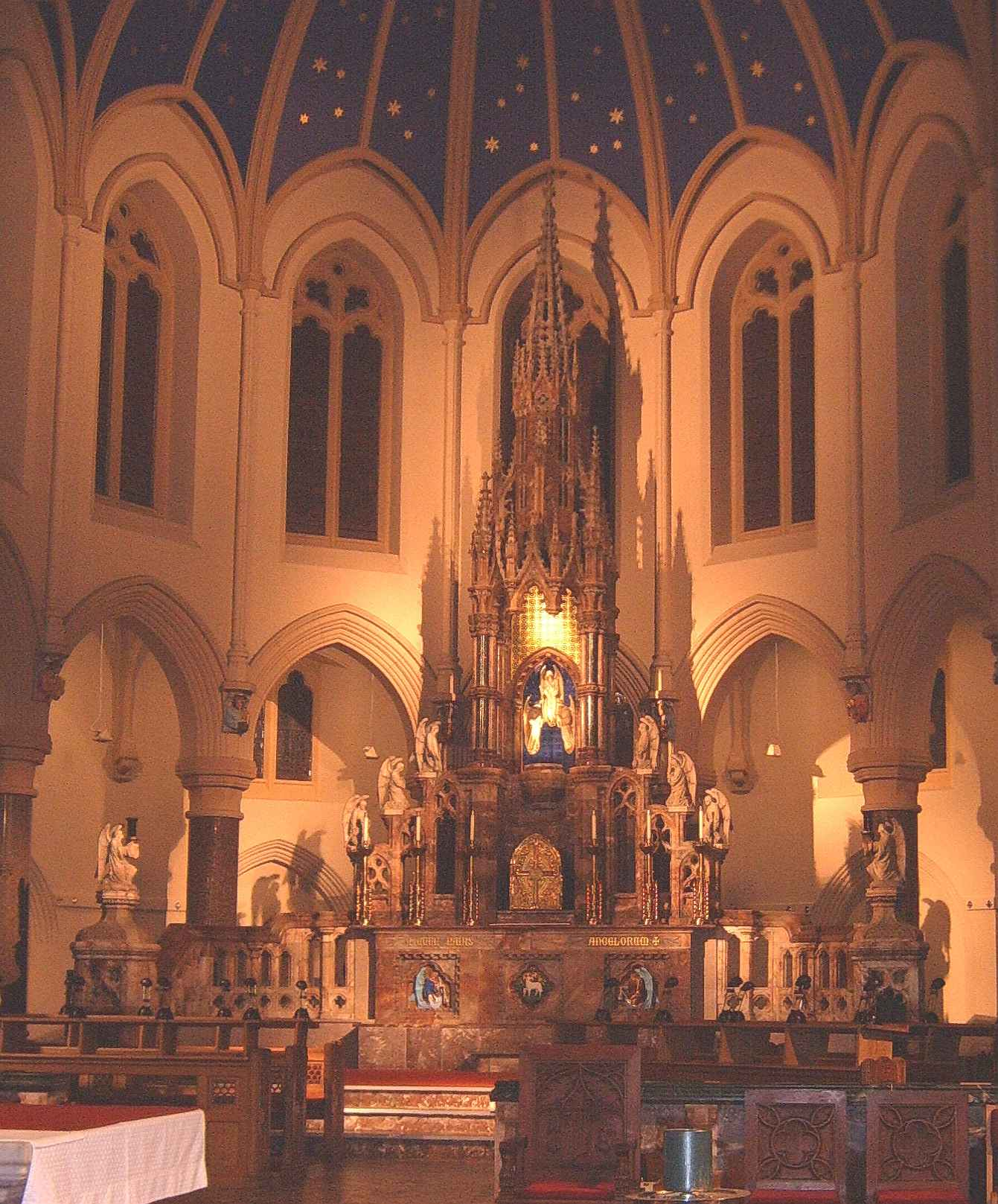
Altar in St Mary and St Benedict's Church, Bamber Bridge

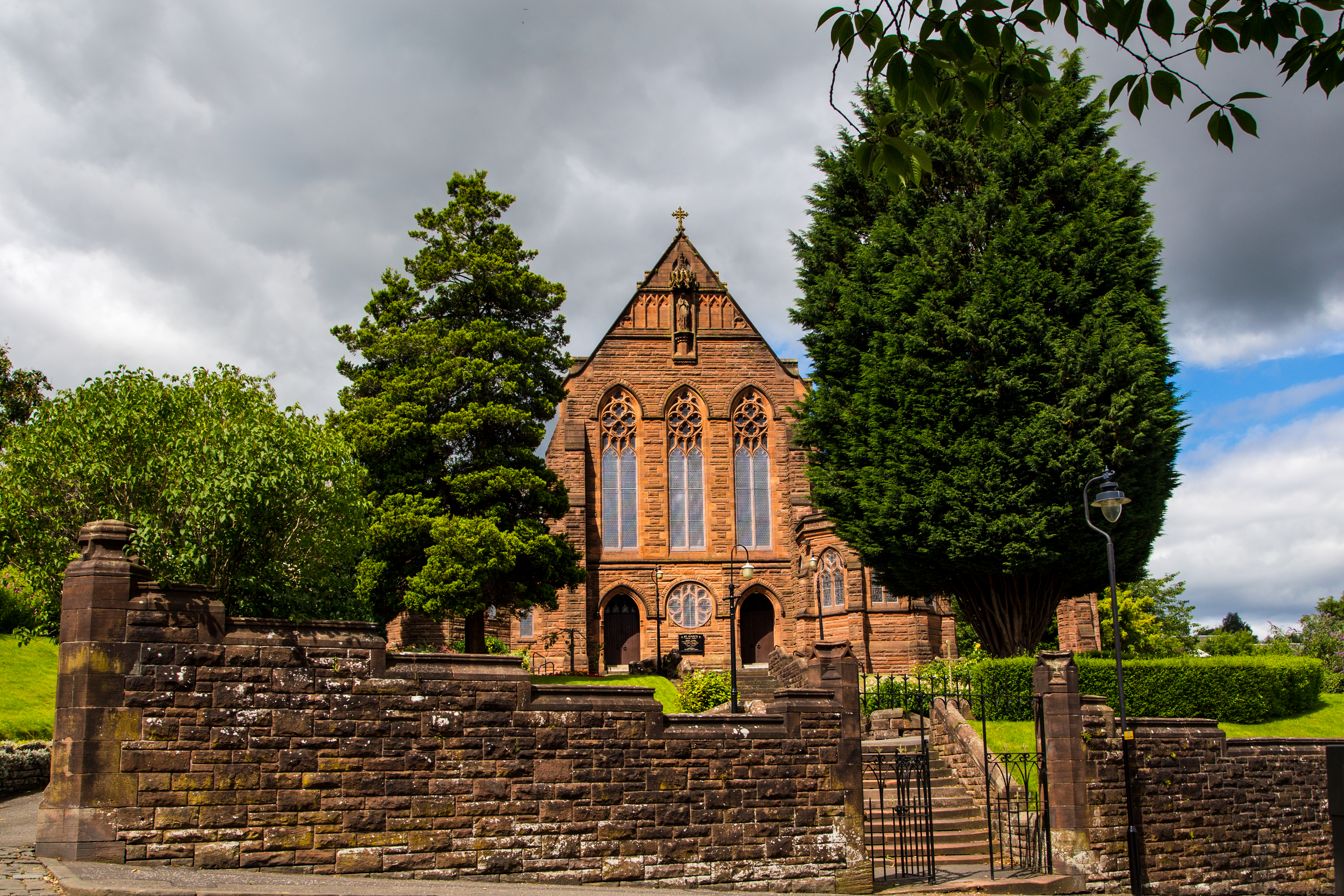
St Mary's Church, Stirling
