= E. W. Pugin =

English architect

Edward Welby Pugin
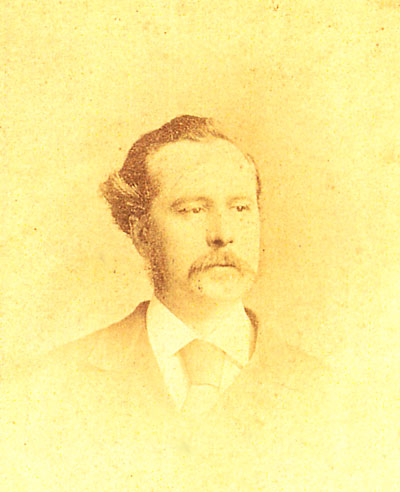
- Born: 11 March 1834; Ramsgate, England
- Died: 5 June 1875 (aged 41)
- Occupation: Architect
- Employer(s): Edward Welby Pugin, Architect
- Known for: Gothic Revival architect and designer
- Father: Augustus Pugin
- Relatives: Augustus Charles Pugin (grandfather); Cuthbert Welby Pugin (brother), Peter Paul Pugin (half-brother)

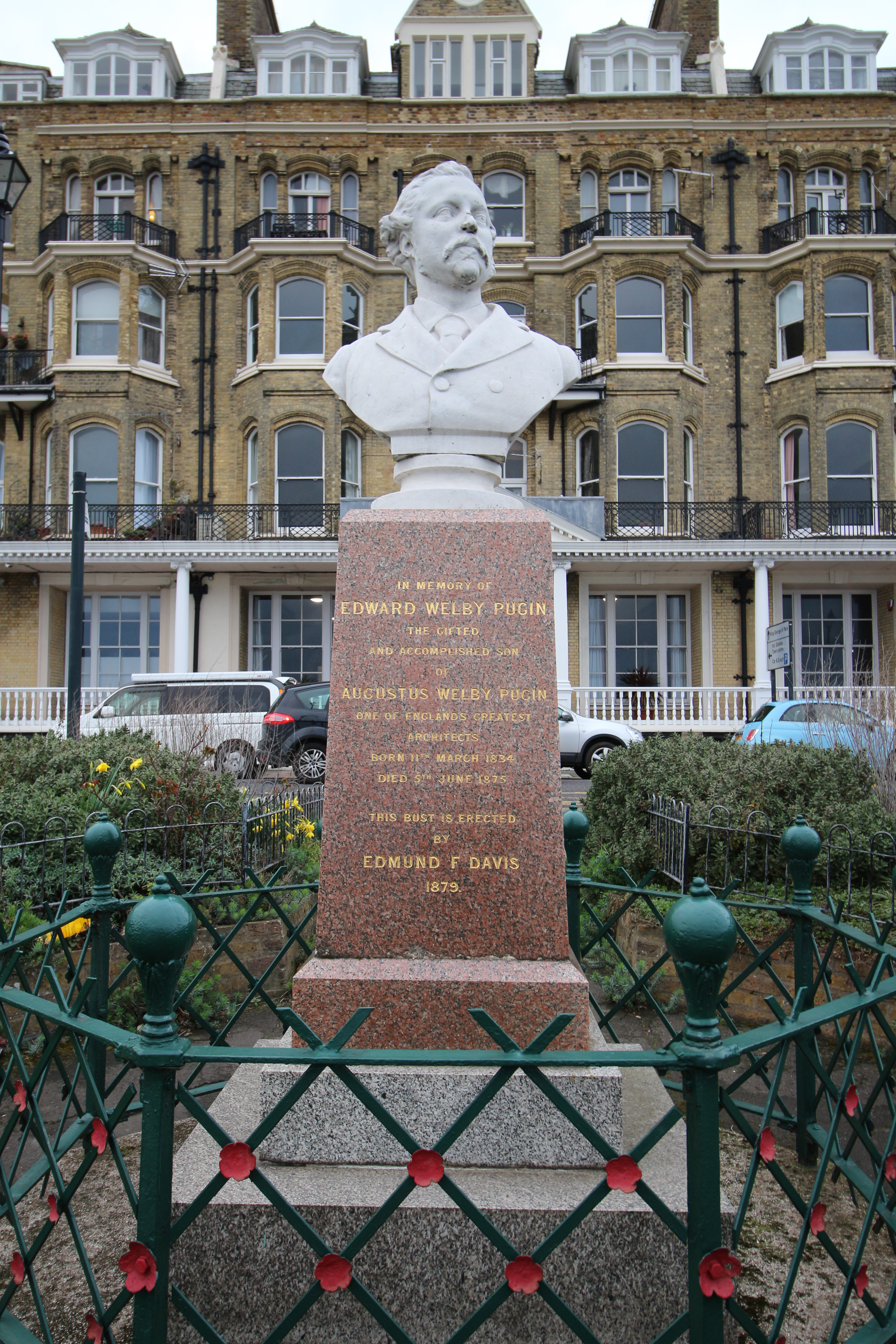
Memorial bust to Edward Pugin, in front of Granville House (formerly the Granville Hotel, Ramsgate). “In memory of Edward Welby Pugin, the gifted and accomplished son of Augustus Welby Pugin, one of England's greatest architects: born 11th March, 1834, died 5th June, 1875. This bust is erected by Edmund Francis Davis. 1879.”

Edward Welby Pugin (11 March 1834 – 5 June 1875) was an English architect, the eldest son of architect Augustus Welby Northmore Pugin and Louisa Barton. His father was an architect in the Gothic Revival style, and after his early death in 1852 Edward continued his practice. At the time of his own early death in 1875, Pugin had designed and completed more than one hundred Catholic churches. His brothers Cuthbert and Peter continued the practice as Pugin & Pugin.

== Career ==
From c.1856 he developed a style independent of his father's, in which expansive spatial planning was combined with great detail. He designed churches and cathedrals primarily in the British Isles. However, commissions for his work were also received from countries throughout Western Europe, Scandinavia, and North America.

As his business grew, Pugin formed partnerships which turned out to be short-lived: with James Murray in Liverpool (1857 to 1860), with George Ashlin in Dublin (1860 to 1869), and with Joseph Hansom (1862 to 1863). He was bankrupted in 1873 by the failure of a business he was involved in, the Granville Hotel and spa at Ramsgate, Kent.

Pugin was admitted as a fellow of the Royal Institute of British Architects in 1862.

== Personal life ==
Pugin was unmarried. He died on 5 June 1875 as a result of "overwork and injudicious use of chloral hydrate".

== Works in Ireland ==
- Ss Peter and Paul's, Carey's Lane, Cork (1859)
- Edermine, Enniscorthy, County Wexford (c. 1858)
- Cobh Cathedral (1867)
- Killarney Cathedral
- Fermoy Catholic Church, County Cork (1867)
- Drogheda Christian Brothers Residence (currently Scholars Townhouse Hotel (1867)
- Crosshaven Catholic Church, County Cork (1869)
- Monkstown Catholic Church, County Dublin (1866)
- Monkstown Catholic Church, County Cork (1866)
- Convent of Mercy, Skibbereen, County Cork (1867)
- Convent of Mercy, Birr, County Offaly
- John's Lane Church, Dublin
- Church of the Sacred Heart, Donnybrook, Dublin
- Attributed to:
  - AIB bank, Midleton
  - Midleton Arms
  - Church and Convent, Ramsgrange, County Wexford
  - Bellevue Catholic Church, County Wexford
  - Mercy Convent, Pearce Street, Nenagh County Tipperary

== Works in England ==
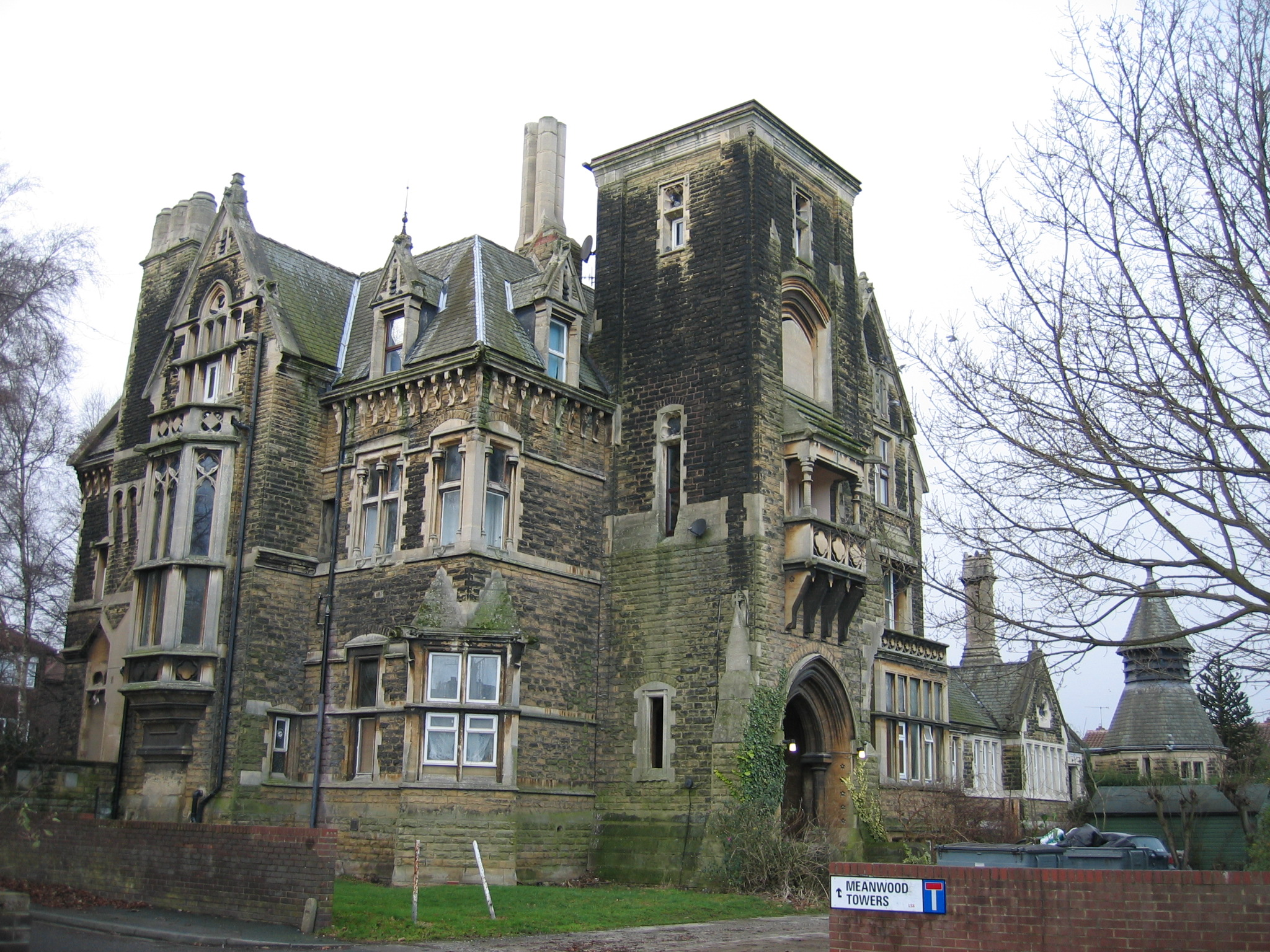
Meanwood Towers in Meanwood, Leeds

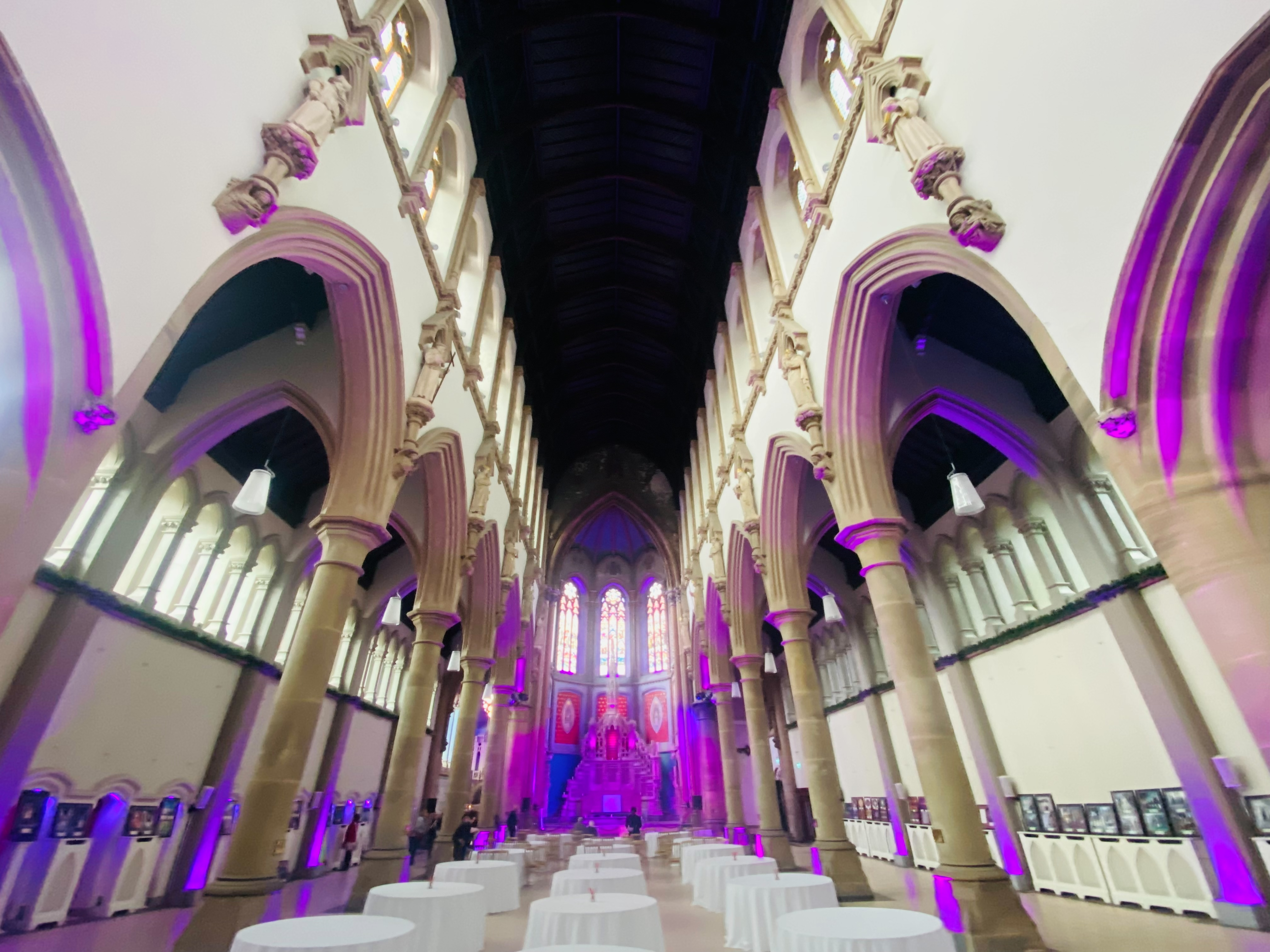
Gorton Monastery

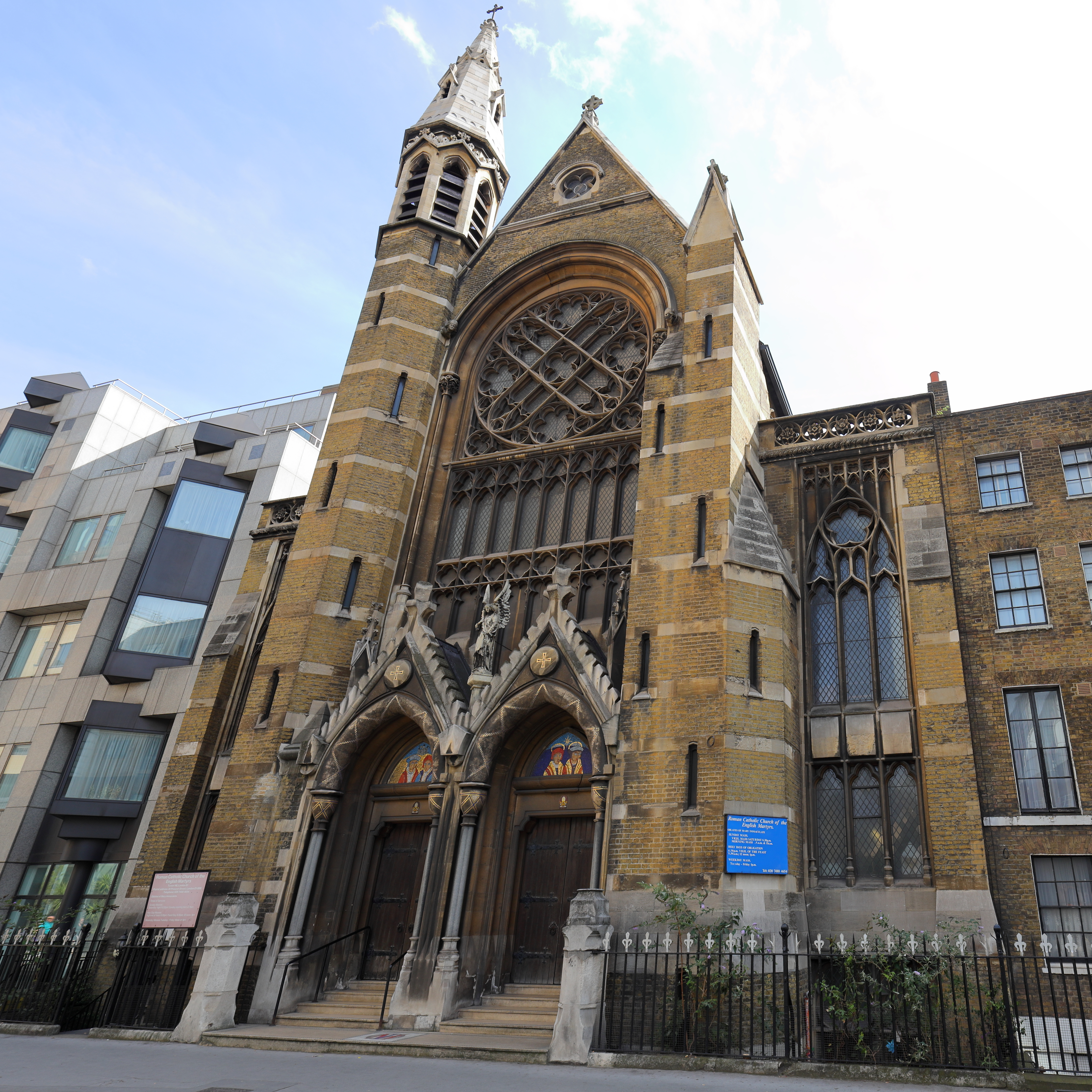
Church of the English Martyrs, London E1

- St Patrick's Wolverhampton (demolished)
- 1853: Our Lady Immaculate and St Cuthbert, Crook, County Durham
- 1856: Shrewsbury Cathedral, the Cathedral Church of Our Lady Help of Christians and Saint Peter of Alcantara, Town Walls, Shrewsbury (built as a cathedral)
- 1856: Our Lady Immaculate, St Domingo Road, Everton, Liverpool. Demolished. Lady Chapel of scheme for Liverpool Cathedral
- 1856: St Vincent de Paul, St. James Street, Liverpool
- 1857: Holy Cross, Croston, Lancashire; small estate church
- 1857: Sacred Heart Church, Blackpool
- 1857–1858: Our Lady of the Annunciation Church, Liverpool
- 1857–1859: Our Lady and St Hubert, Great Harwood, Lancashire
- 1858: Our Lady Help of Christians and attached Presbytery, Fortess Road, Kentish Town, London (both demolished - although the facade of the latter was rebuilt)
- 1858: St Peter's School, Woolwich
- 1859: Belmont Abbey, Hereford, Herefordshire (the Abbey Church was built as the pro-Cathedral for Wales)
- 1860: Octagonal Chapter House, Mount Saint Bernard Abbey, Leicestershire
- 1859–1860: Our Lady of la Salette, Liverpool
- 1860: St Mary Immaculate, Warwick
- 1860–1861: St Anne, Westby, Kirkham, Lancashire
- 1861: St Edward, Thurloe Street, Rusholme, Manchester
- 1861–1865: St Michael, West Derby Road, Everton, Liverpool
- 1862: St Anne, Chester Road, Stretford, near Manchester
- 1862: St Austin, Wolverhampton Road, Stafford
- 1862: Scarisbrick Hall, Lancashire, renovations to his father's original designs
- 1863: St Peter, Greengate, Salford, Lancashire
- 1863: SS Henry and Elizabeth, Sheerness, Kent
- 1863: Convent of Our Lady of Charity and Refuge, Bartestree, Herefordshire (converted to flats)
- 1863: St Joseph, Bolton Road, Anderton, Chorley, Lancashire
- 1863–1864: Monument to Everard Aloysius Lisle Phillipps, VC, Cademan Wood, Whitwick, Leicestershire (demolished)
- 1864: Our Lady and All Saints, New Road, Stourbridge, Worcestershire
- 1864: St Marie, Lugsdale Road, Widnes, Cheshire (redundant)
- 1864: St Mary's Church, Croydon
- 1864: St Hubert, Dunsop Bridge, Yorkshire
- 1864–1866: Augustinian Priory, school and Church of St Monica, Hoxton Square, London N1
- 1865: St Mary, Euxton, Lancashire
- 1865: St Catherine, Kingsdown, Kent
- 1865–1866: Mayfield Boys' Orphanage (later Mayfield College, from 2007 converted to residential apartments as Mayfield Grange), Mayfield, Sussex
- 1865–1867: St Joseph, York Road, Birkdale, Southport, Lancashire
- 1866: Euxton Hall Chapel, Euxton, near Chorley, Lancashire
- 1866: St Francis Monastery, Gorton, Manchester
- 1866: Our Blessed Lady and St. Joseph, Leadgate, Durham
- 1866: Chancel and transepts to Mount St Mary's Church, Leeds
- 1866–1868: Meanwood Towers, Meanwood, Leeds
- 1866–1867: St Mary's Church, Barrow-in-Furness, Lancashire
- 1866–1867: St Michael and All Angels, Mortuary Chapel and Knill Memorial, Brockley Cemetery, London, destroyed by bombing in 1944
- 1866–1867: Church of St Thomas of Canterbury and the English Martyrs, Preston, Lancashire (extended 1887–88)
- 1866–1867: The Chapel of the Immaculate Conception, Ratcliffe College, Ratcliffe on the Wreake, Leicestershire; converted for school use in 1962 on the completion of a new, larger chapel
- 1867: St Paul's Church, Dover, Kent
- 1867–1868: St Mary, Fleetwood, Lancashire
- 1867–1868: All Saints' Church in Urmston, Greater Manchester
- 1867–1871: Our Lady and St Paulinus, Dewsbury, West Yorkshire
- 1868: St Begh, Coach Road, Whitehaven, Cumberland
- 1869–1872: Our Lady of the Sacred Heart, Cleator, Cumberland
- 1869: St Michael's Orphanage for Girls, aka St Joseph's College, Mark Cross, East Sussex
- 1869: Granville Hotel, Ramsgate, Kent
- 1871: Stanbrook Abbey, Powick, Worcestershire
- 1872: Grosvenor Victorian Turkish Baths (with house and shop), 119 Buckingham Palace Road, London
- 1873: St Mary's Church, Brierley Hill
- 1873–1875: Carlton Towers, Yorkshire, for Lord Beaumont
- 1875 (Edward Welby Pugin dies)
- 1875: St Anne Rommer, Highfield Road, Rockferry, Birkenhead, Wirral, Cheshire
- 1873–1876: English Martyrs Church, 30 Prescot Street, London E1
- 1876: Our Lady Star of the Sea, Workington
- 1877: Sacred Heart Church, Kilburn, London
- 1877: St Mary's Church, Warrington, Cheshire

== Works in Scotland ==
- 1854 St Mary's Star of the Sea Church, Leith, Edinburgh
- 1856 St Stephen, Blairgowrie
- 1862: Church of St Mary, Haddington, East Lothian
- 1874: Church of St Mary and St Finnan, Glenfinnan

== Works in Wales ==
- 1857 Wrexham Cathedral: Cathedral of our Lady of Sorrows

== Works on the Isle of Man ==
- 1865 St Patrick, Peel

== Works in Belgium (province of West Flanders) ==
- 1856 Basilica of Our Lady in Dadizele, finished by Jean-Baptiste Bethune
- 1856 Castle of Loppem, in collaboration with James Murray and George Ashlin, finished by Jean-Baptiste Bethune
- 1861 country estate near Bruges for bishop Joannes Baptista Malou, demolished

== Works with James Murray (1856–c. 1859) ==
=== Rugby Town Hall and Markets ===
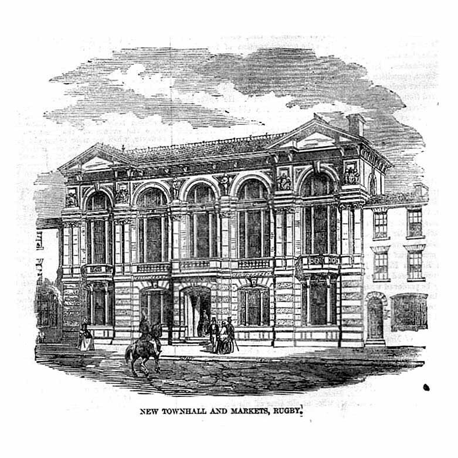
Rugby Town Hall

The old Town Hall stood on the High Street. It was built in 1857, with an extension in 1919. The upper floor became a cinema (Vint's Palace) around 1913. A fire destroyed most of the building in 1921 and it was rebuilt as Woolworths, which opened in 1923 and closed in 2009.

== Works in association with George Ashlin (1859-1869) ==
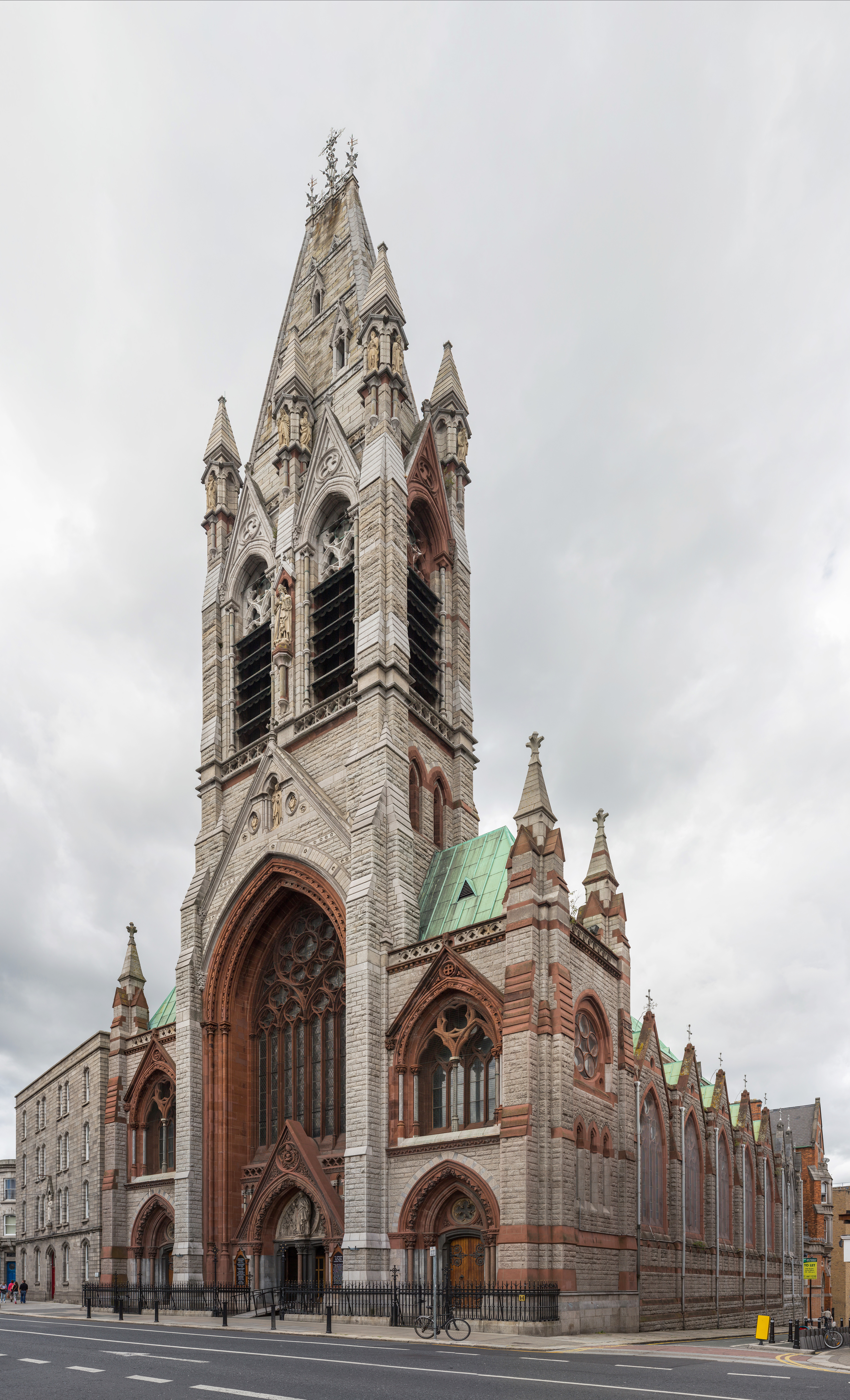
John's Lane Church, Dublin

- Saints Peter and Paul's Church, Cork, (1859)
- Convent of Mercy, Clonakilty, County Cork (1867)
- Convent and Orphanage, William Street North, Dublin (1867)
- SS Augustine and John, Thomas Street, Dublin (1860)

Regarded as Dublin's finest Victorian church, SS Augustine and John (John's Lane Church) in the Liberties area was designed by E. W. Pugin and executed by his partner George Ashlin for the Augustinian Fathers. It was built between 1862 and 1895. It has the tallest spire in Dublin (231 ft), and occupies a prominent position on high ground overlooking the Liffey Valley. It has a striking polychromatic appearance, being built in granite with red sandstone dressings.

The eminent Gothic revivalist Ruskin is said to have praised it, describing it as a "poem in stone".

Statues of the apostles in the niches of the spire are by James Pearse, father of Padraig and Willie, who were executed after the 1916 Easter Rising.

There is stained glass from the Harry Clarke studios.

- Presentation Convent, Fethard, County Tipperary (1862)
- Harrington Street Catholic Church, Dublin (1867); online
- Donnybrook Catholic Church, Dublin (1863)
- Monkstown Catholic Church, County Dublin (1865)
- Arles Catholic Church, Stradbally, County Laois (1965)
- Ferrybank Catholic Church, Waterford (1867)
- Kilanerin Catholic Church, Wexford (1865)
- Lady's Island Catholic Church, County Wexford (1863)
