= Augustus Pugin =

English architect and designer (1812–1852)

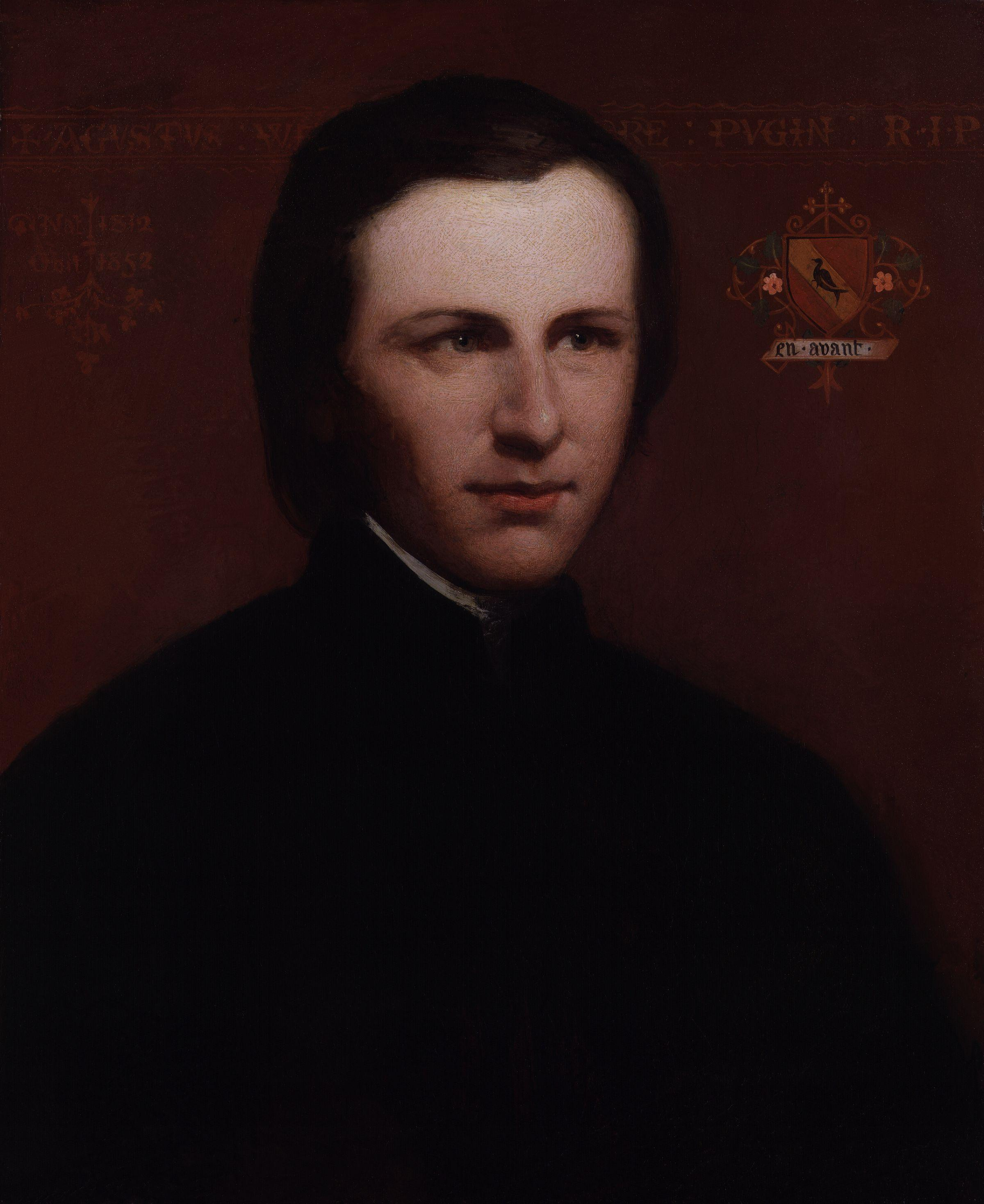
- Portrait, c. 1840
- Born: Augustus Welby Northmore Pugin; 1 March 1812; Keppel Street, Bloomsbury, London, England
- Died: 14 September 1852 (aged 40); Ramsgate, Kent, England
- Occupation: Architect
- Children: Edward Welby Pugin, Cuthbert Welby Pugin, Peter Paul Pugin, and three others
- Father: Augustus Charles Pugin
- Practice: Architecture and interior design in the Gothic style
- Buildings: Palace of Westminster, Westminster, London
- Design: Many Victorian churches, Big Ben, interior of the Houses of Parliament

Augustus Welby Northmore Pugin (Note: Augustus Welby Northmore Pugin variously abbreviated his name during his lifetime, and others since, as A.W.N. Pugin, A.W. Pugin, and Augustus Pugin.) (/ˈpjuːdʒɪn/ PEW-jin; 1 March 1812 – 14 September 1852) was an English architect, designer, artist and critic with French and Swiss origins. He is principally remembered for his pioneering role in the Gothic Revival style of architecture. Among his best-known work is the interior of the Palace of Westminster (the meeting place of the Parliament of the United Kingdom) and its clock tower nicknamed 'Big Ben'. Pugin designed many churches in England, and some in Ireland and Australia. He was the son of Auguste Pugin, and the father of Edward Welby Pugin, Cuthbert Welby Pugin, and Peter Paul Pugin, who continued his architectural and interior design firm as Pugin & Pugin.

== Biography ==
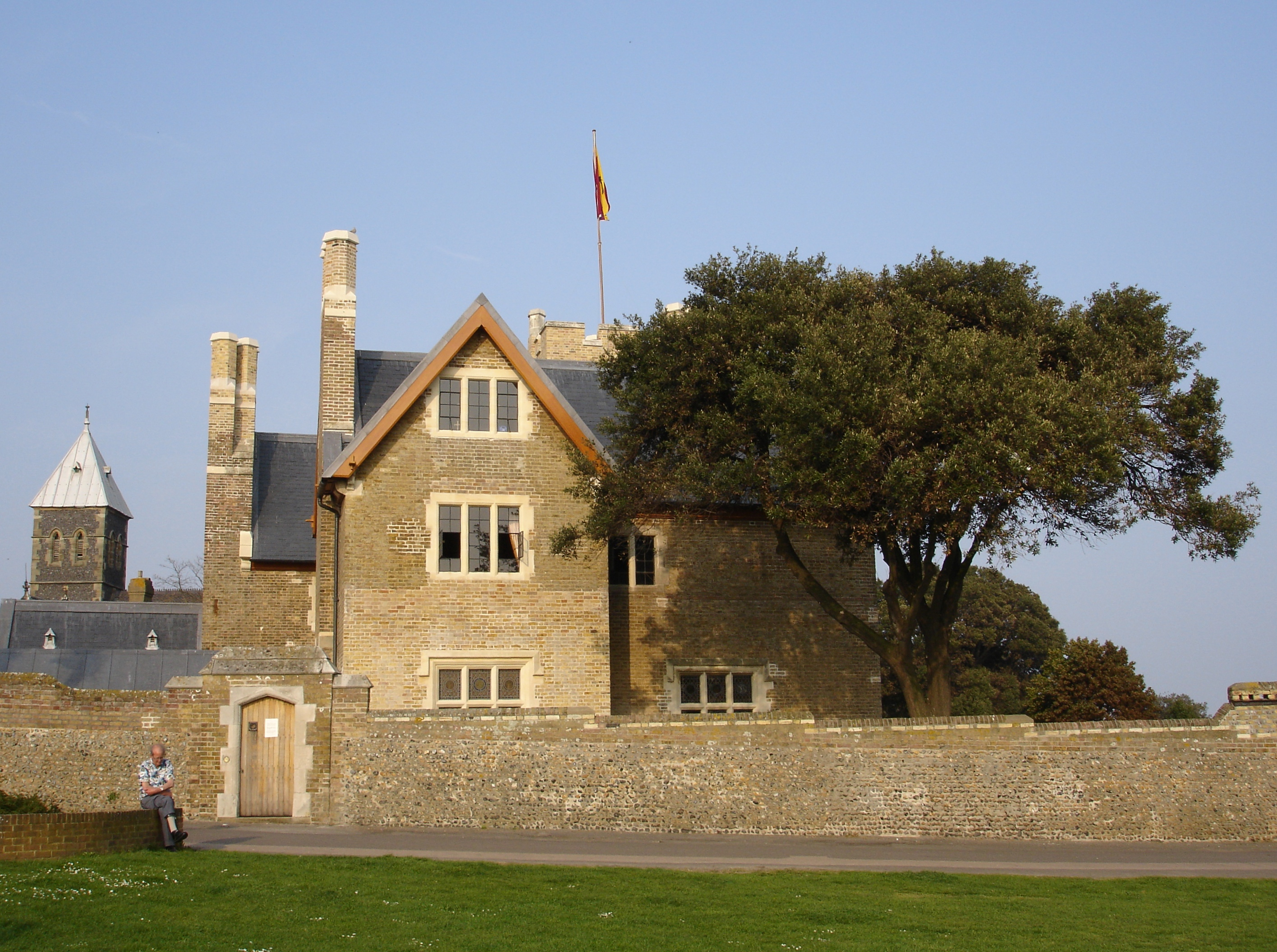
The Grange, Ramsgate, Thanet, Kent, England, designed by Pugin as his family home

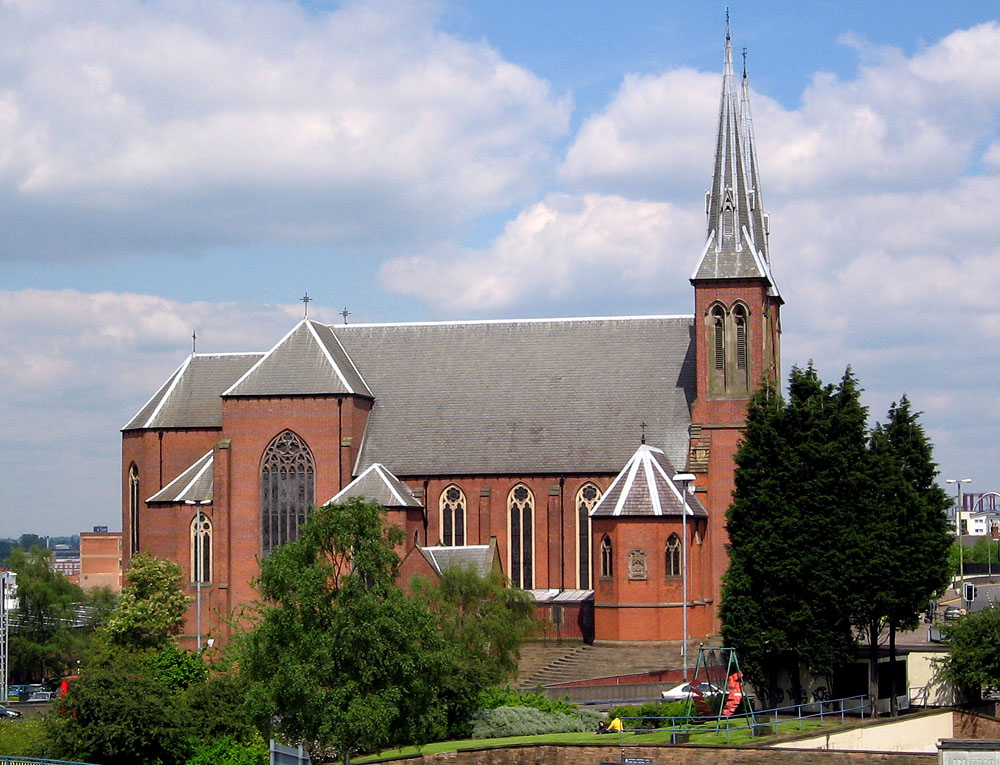
St Chad's Cathedral in Birmingham, England

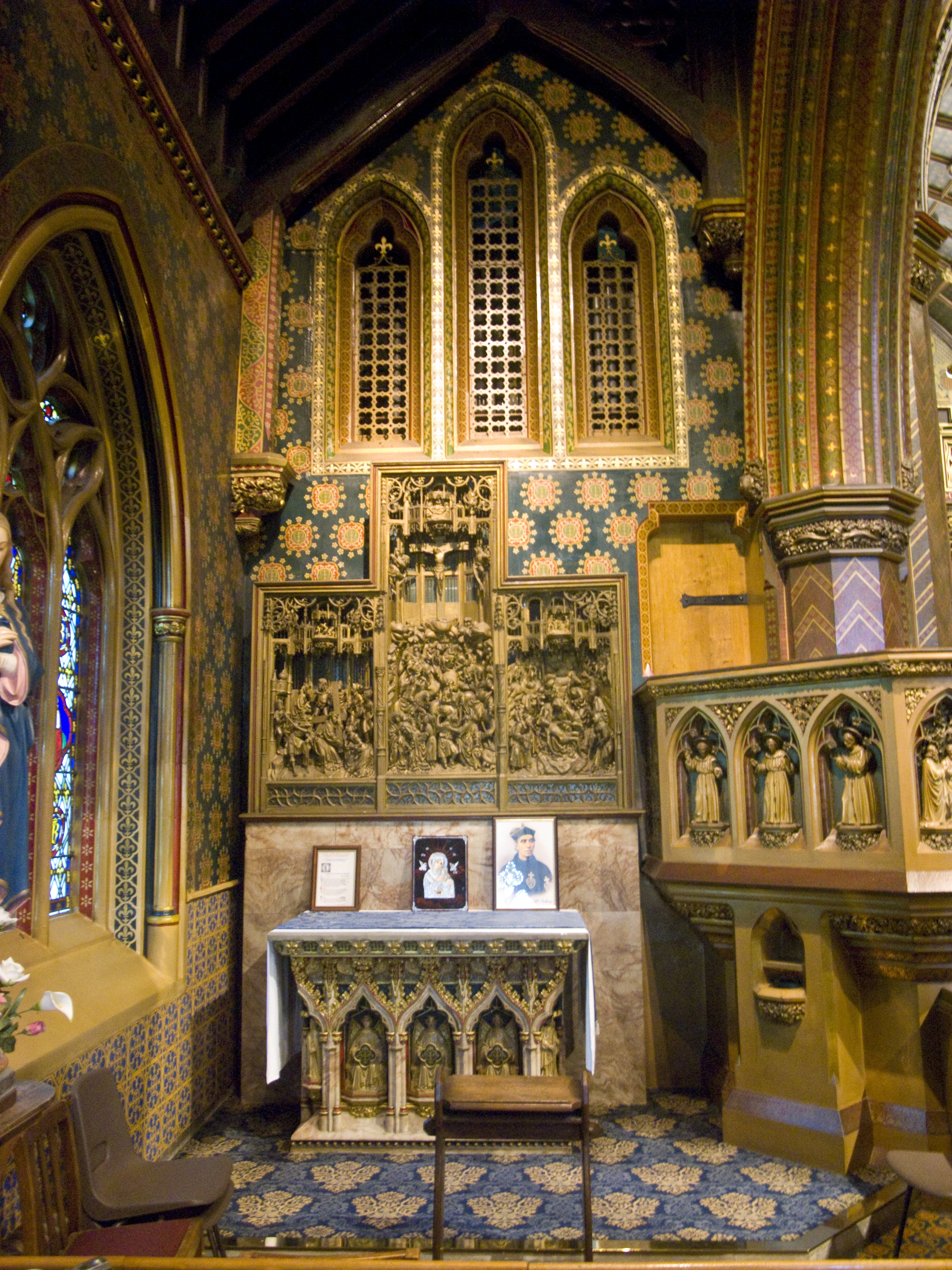
The northeast chapel of St Giles' Catholic Church, Cheadle, Cheadle, Staffordshire, England, designed by Pugin

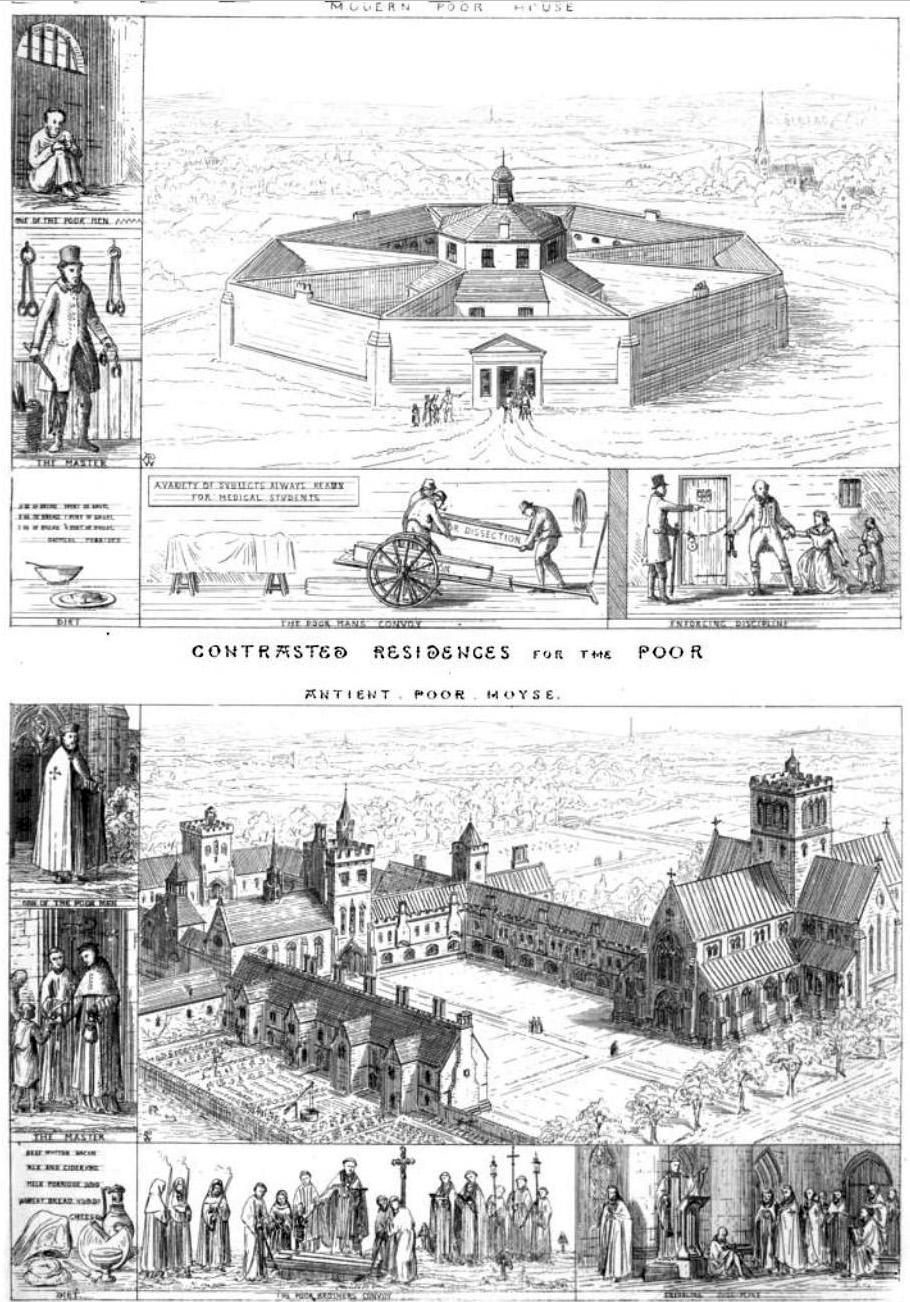
"Contrasted Residences for the Poor" from Pugin's Contrasts

Pugin was the son of the French draughtsman Auguste Pugin, who had immigrated to England as a result of the French Revolution and had married Catherine Welby of the Welby family of Denton, Lincolnshire, England. Pugin was born on 1 March 1812 at his parents' house in Bloomsbury, London, England. Between 1821 and 1838, Pugin's father published a series of volumes of architectural drawings, the first two entitled Specimens of Gothic Architecture and the following three Examples of Gothic Architecture, that not only remained in print but were the standard references for Gothic architecture for at least the next century.

=== Religion ===
As a child, his mother took Pugin each Sunday to the services of the fashionable Scottish Presbyterian preacher Edward Irving (later the founder of the Holy Catholic Apostolic Church), at his chapel in Cross Street, Hatton Garden, Camden, London. Pugin quickly rebelled against this version of Christianity: according to Benjamin Ferrey, Pugin "always expressed unmitigated disgust at the cold and sterile forms of the Scottish church; and the moment he broke free from the trammels imposed on him by his mother, he rushed into the arms of a church which, pompous by its ceremonies, was attractive to his imaginative mind".

=== Education and early ventures ===
Pugin learned drawing from his father, and for a while attended Christ's Hospital. After leaving school, he worked in his father's office, and in 1825 and 1827 accompanied him on visits to France. His first commissions independent of his father were for designs for the goldsmiths Rundell and Bridge, and for designs for furniture of Windsor Castle from the upholsterers Morel and Seddon. Through a contact made while working at Windsor, he became interested in the design of theatrical scenery, and in 1831 obtained a commission to design the sets for the production of the new opera Kenilworth at the Royal Opera House, Covent Garden. He also developed an interest in sailing, and briefly commanded a small merchant schooner trading between Great Britain and Holland, which allowed him to import examples of furniture and carving from Flanders, with which he later furnished his house at Ramsgate in Kent. During one voyage in 1830, he was wrecked on the Scottish coast near Leith, as a result of which he came into contact with Edinburgh architect James Gillespie Graham, who advised him to abandon seafaring for architecture. He then established a business supplying historically accurate carved wood and stone detailing for the increasing number of buildings being constructed in the Gothic Revival style, but the enterprise quickly failed.

=== Marriages ===
In 1831, at the age of 19, Pugin married the first of his three wives, Anne Garnet. She died a few months later in childbirth, leaving him a daughter. He had a further six children, including the future architect Edward Welby Pugin, with his second wife, Louisa Burton (or Button), who died in 1844. His third wife, Jane Knill, kept a journal of their marital life, from their marriage in 1848 to Pugin's death, which was later published. Their son was the architect Peter Paul Pugin.

=== Salisbury ===
Following his second marriage in 1833, Pugin moved to Salisbury, Wiltshire, with his wife, and in 1835 bought one-half of an acre (0.20 ha) of land in Alderbury, about one and a half miles (2.4 km) outside the town. On this, he built a Gothic Revival-style house for his family, which he named St Marie's Grange. Of it, Charles Eastlake said "he had not yet learned the art of combining a picturesque exterior with the ordinary comforts of an English home".

=== Conversion to Catholicism ===
In 1834, Pugin converted to Catholicism and was received into it the following year.

British society at the start of the 19th century often discriminated against dissenters from the Church of England, although things began to change during Pugin's lifetime, helping to make Pugin's eventual conversion to Catholicism more socially acceptable. For example, dissenters could not take degrees at the established universities of Oxford and Cambridge until 1871, but the University of London (later renamed University College London) was founded near Pugin's birthplace in 1826 with the express purpose of educating dissenters to degree standard (although it would not be able to confer degrees until 1836). Dissenters were also unable to serve on parish or city councils, be a member of Parliament, serve in the armed forces or be on a jury. A number of reforms across the 19th century relieved these restrictions, one of which was the Roman Catholic Relief Act 1829, which allowed Catholics to become members of Parliament.

Pugin's conversion acquainted him with new patrons and employers. In 1832 he made the acquaintance of John Talbot, 16th Earl of Shrewsbury, a Catholic sympathetic to his aesthetic theory and who employed him in alterations and additions to his residence of Alton Towers, which subsequently led to many more commissions. Shrewsbury commissioned him to build St Giles Catholic Church, Cheadle, Staffordshire, which was completed in 1846, and Pugin was also responsible for designing the oldest Catholic Church in Shropshire, St Peter and Paul Church, Newport.

=== Contrasts ===
In 1836, Pugin published Contrasts, a polemical book which argued for the revival of the medieval Gothic style, and also "a return to the faith and the social structures of the Middle Ages". The book was prompted by the passage of the Church Building Acts of 1818 and 1824, the former of which is often called the Million Pound Act due to the appropriation amount by Parliament for the construction of new Anglican churches in Britain. The new churches constructed from these funds, many of them in a Gothic Revival style due to the assertion that it was the "cheapest" style to use, were often criticised by Pugin and many others for their shoddy design and workmanship and poor liturgical standards relative to an authentic Gothic structure.

Each plate in Contrasts selected a type of urban building and contrasted the 1830 example with its 15th-century equivalent. In one example, Pugin contrasted a medieval monastic foundation, where monks fed and clothed the needy, grew food in the gardens – and gave the dead a decent burial – with "a panopticon workhouse where the poor were beaten, half-starved and sent off after death for dissection. Each structure was the built expression of a particular view of humanity: Christianity versus Utilitarianism." Pugin's biographer, Rosemary Hill, wrote: "The drawings were all calculatedly unfair. King's College London was shown from an unflatteringly skewed angle, while Christ Church, Oxford, was edited to avoid showing its famous Tom Tower because that was by Christopher Wren and so not medieval. But the cumulative rhetorical force was tremendous."

In 1841 he published his illustrated The True Principles of Pointed or Christian Architecture, which was premised on his two fundamental principles of Christian architecture. He conceived of "Christian architecture" as synonymous with medieval, "Gothic", or "pointed", architecture. In the work, he also wrote that contemporary craftsmen seeking to emulate the style of medieval workmanship should reproduce its methods.

=== Ramsgate ===
In 1841 he left Salisbury, having found it an inconvenient base for his growing architectural practice. He sold St Marie's Grange at a considerable financial loss, and moved temporarily to Cheyne Walk in Chelsea, London. He had already purchased a parcel of land at West Cliff, Ramsgate in Kent, where he proceeded to build for himself a house, The Grange, and at his own expense, a church dedicated to St Augustine, after whom he thought himself named. He worked on this church whenever funds permitted it. His second wife died in 1844 and was buried at St Chad's Cathedral, Birmingham, which he had designed.

=== Architectural commissions ===
Following the destruction by fire of the Palace of Westminster in Westminster, London, in 1834, Pugin was employed by Sir Charles Barry to supply interior designs for his entry to the architectural competition which would determine who would build the new Palace of Westminster. Pugin also supplied drawings for the entry of James Gillespie Graham. This followed a period of employment when Pugin had worked with Barry on the interior design of King Edward's School, Birmingham. Despite his conversion to Catholicism in 1834, Pugin designed and refurbished both Anglican and Catholic churches throughout England.

Other works include St. Chad's Cathedral, Erdington Abbey, and Oscott College, all in Birmingham, England. He also designed the collegiate buildings of St Patrick and St Mary in St Patrick's College, Maynooth, Ireland; though not the collegiate chapel. His original plans included both a chapel and an aula maxima (great hall), neither of which were built because of financial constraints. The college chapel was designed by a follower of Pugin, the Irish architect James Joseph McCarthy. Also in Ireland, Pugin designed St Mary's Cathedral, Killarney (1842–45), St Aidan's Cathedral in Enniscorthy (renovated in 1996), and the Dominican Church of the Holy Cross in Tralee. He revised the plans for St Michael's Church, Ballinasloe, County Galway, Ireland. Bishop William Wareing also invited Pugin to design what eventually became Northampton Cathedral, a project that was completed in 1864 by one of Pugin's sons, Edward Welby Pugin.

Pugin visited Italy in 1847; his experience there confirmed his dislike of Renaissance and Baroque architecture, but he found much to admire in the medieval art of northern Italy.

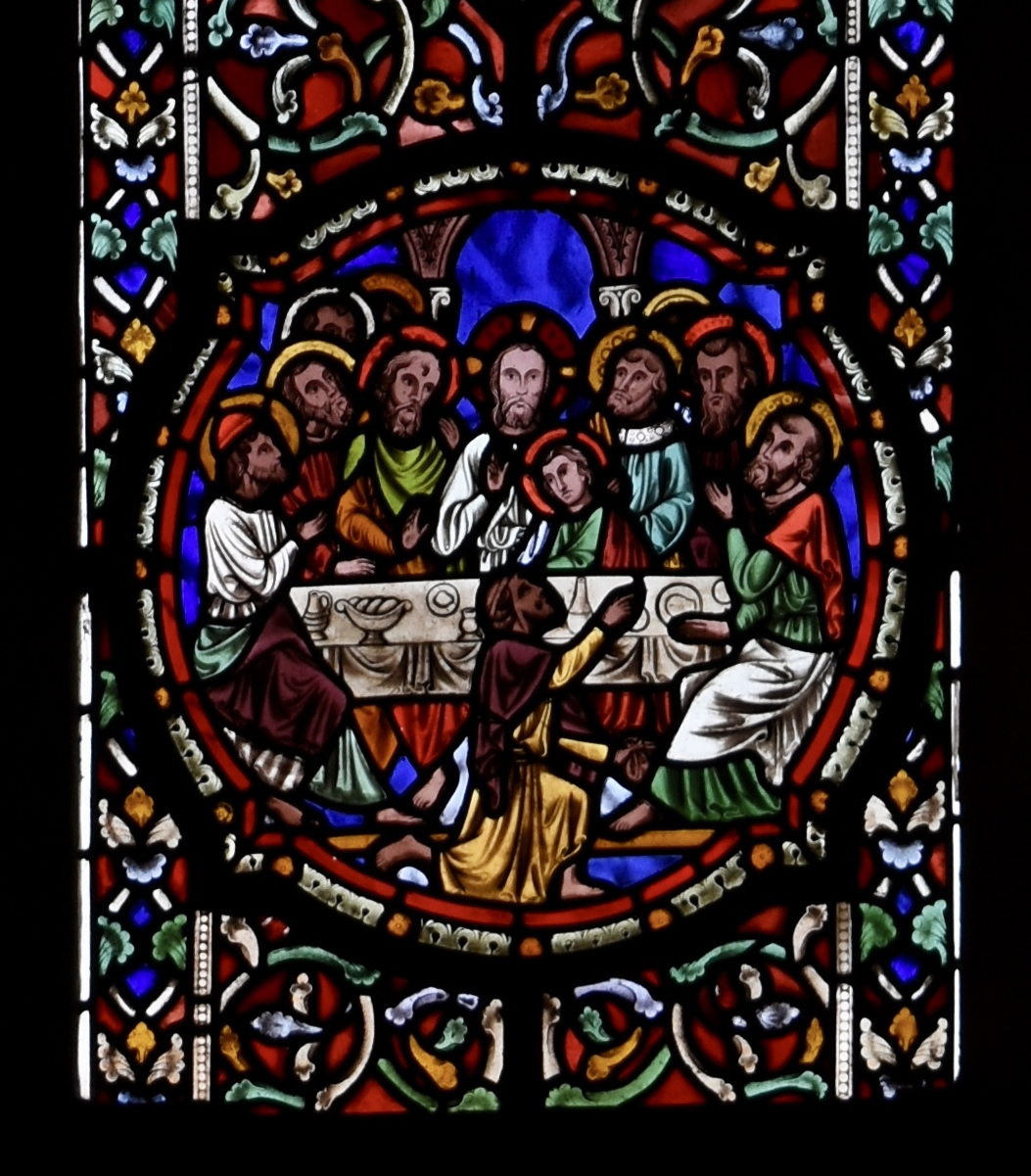
Detail of east window of Jesus College Chapel, Cambridge, made by John Hardman & Co. to a design by Pugin (1848–1850)

=== Stained glass ===
Pugin was a prolific designer of stained glass. He worked with Thomas Willement, William Warrington and William Wailes before persuading his friend John Hardman to start stained glass production.

=== Illness and death ===
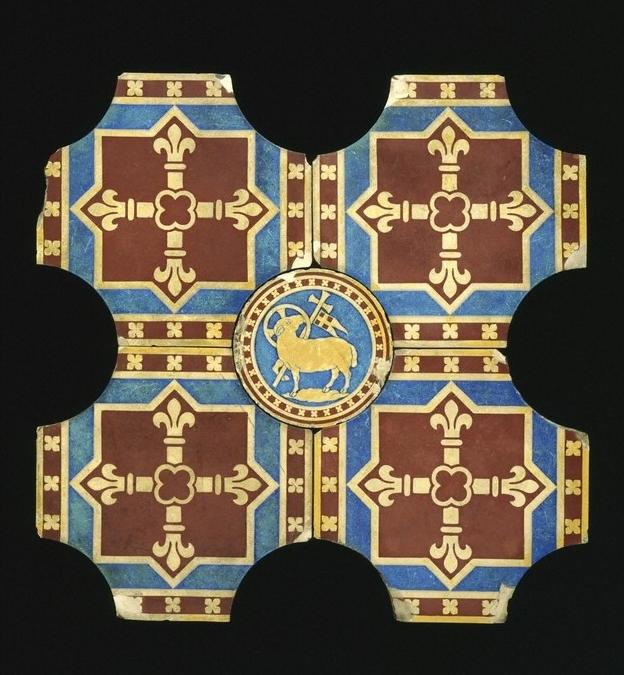
Tiles designed by Pugin (c.1845–51)

In February 1852, while travelling with his son Edward by train, Pugin had a total breakdown and arrived in London unable to recognise anyone or speak coherently. For four months he was confined to a private asylum, Kensington House. In June, he was transferred to the Royal Bethlem Hospital, popularly known as Bedlam. At that time, Bethlem Hospital was opposite St George's Cathedral, Southwark, one of Pugin's major buildings, where he had married his third wife, Jane, in 1848. Jane and a doctor removed Pugin from Bedlam and took him to a private house in Hammersmith where they attempted therapy, and he recovered sufficiently to recognise his wife. In September, Jane took her husband back to The Grange in Ramsgate, where he died on 14 September 1852. He is buried in his church next to The Grange, St. Augustine's.

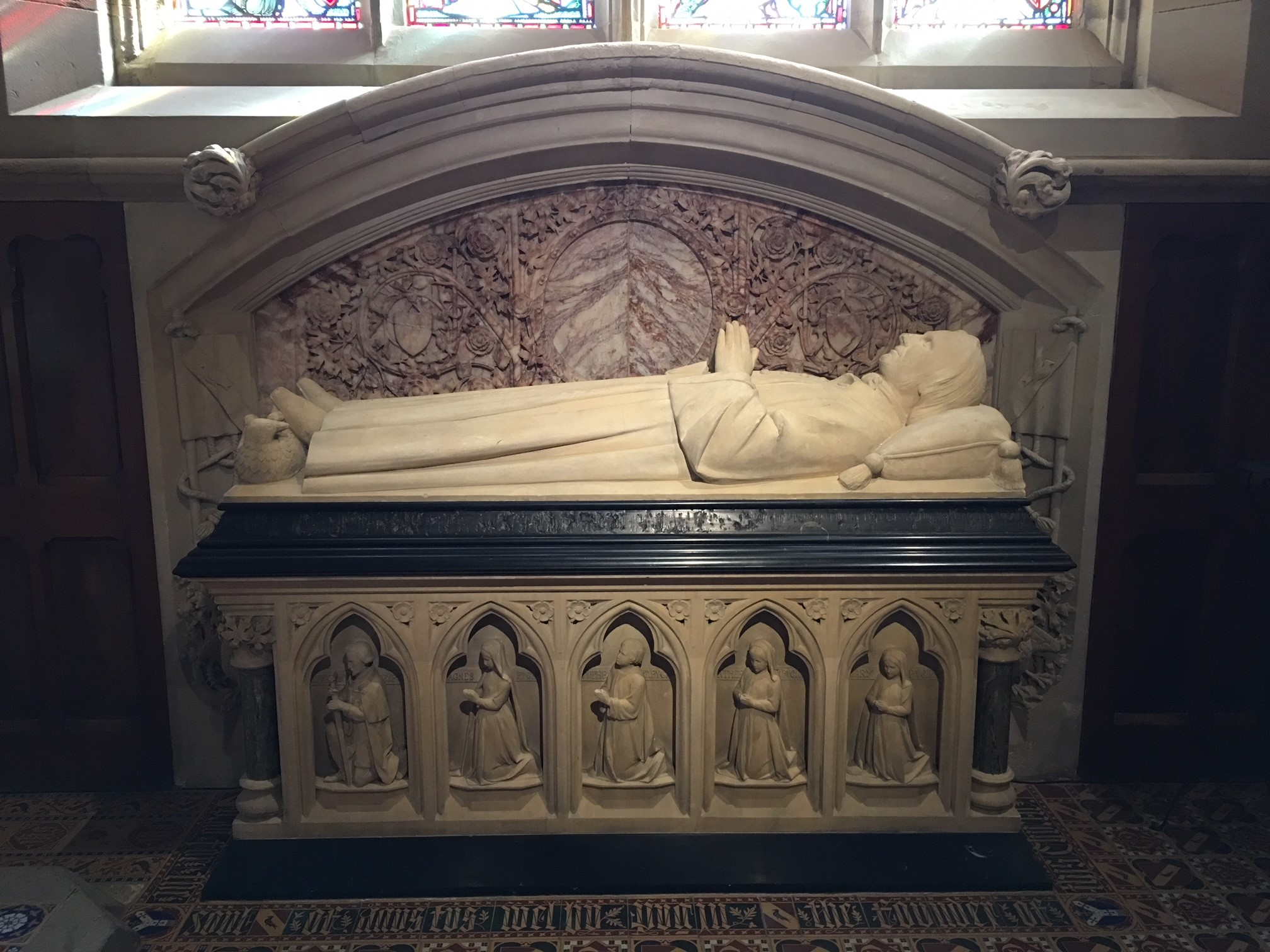
The tomb of Augustus Pugin in St Augustine's Church, Ramsgate

On Pugin's death certificate, the cause listed was "convulsions followed by coma". Pugin's biographer, Rosemary Hill, suggests that, in the last year of his life, he had had hyperthyroidism which would account for his symptoms of exaggerated appetite, perspiration, and restlessness. Hill writes that Pugin's medical history, including eye problems and recurrent illness from his early twenties, suggests that he contracted syphilis in his late teens, and this may have been the cause of his death at the age of 40.

== Palace of Westminster ==
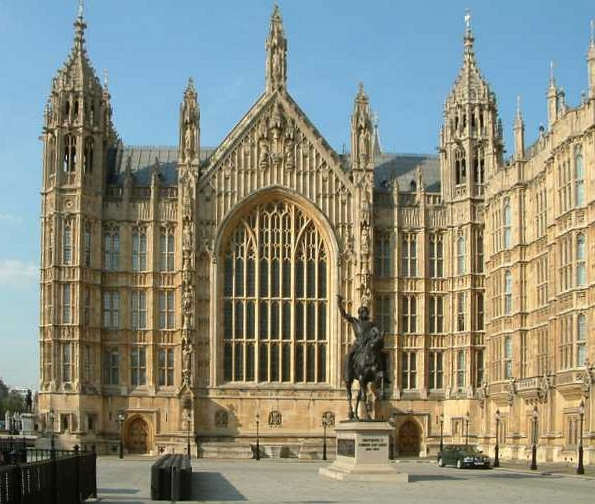
Palace of Westminster

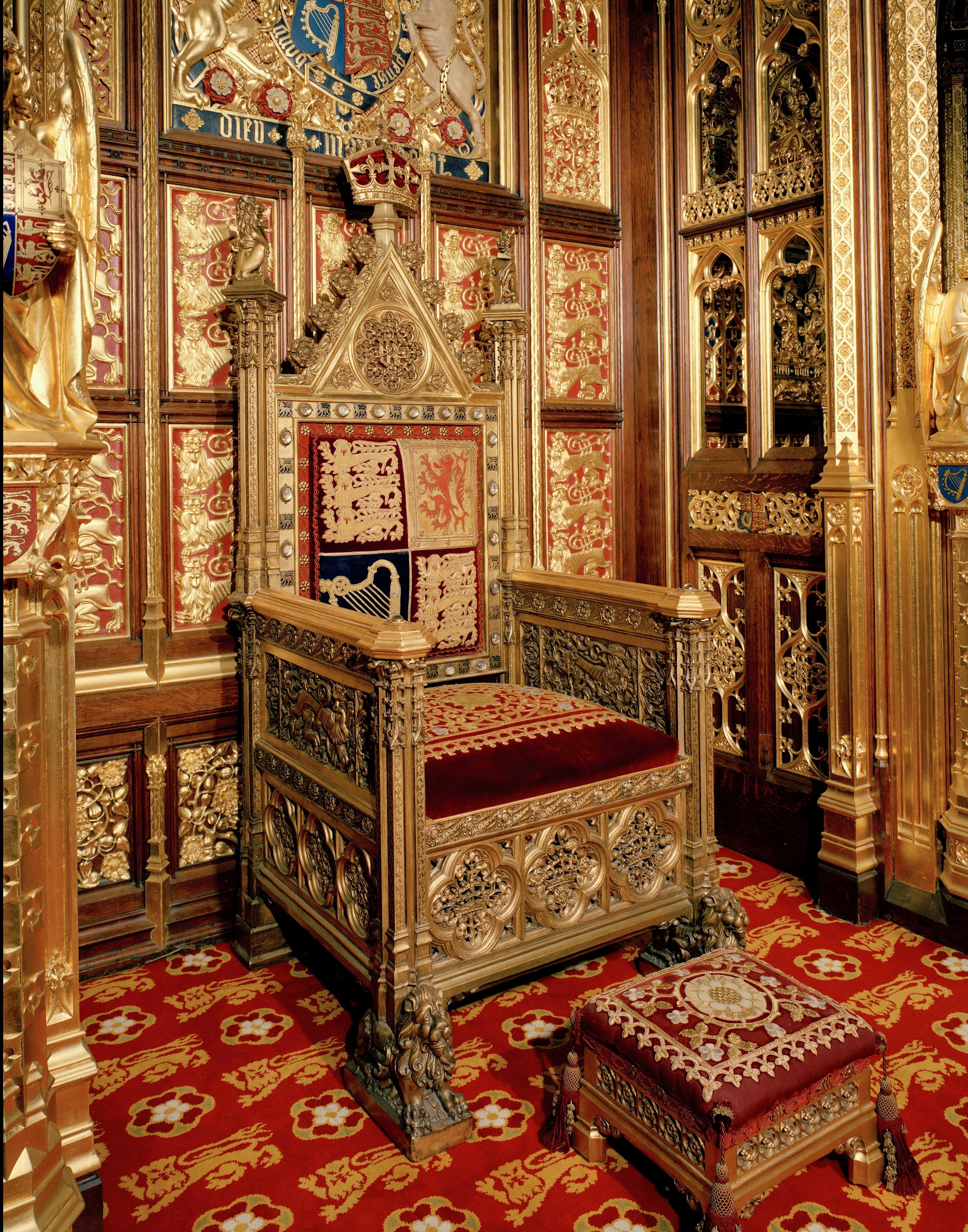
Sovereign's Throne in the Palace of Westminster, designed by Pugin in the 1840s

In October 1834, the Palace of Westminster burned down. Subsequently, the Prime Minister, Sir Robert Peel, wanted, now that he was premier, to disassociate himself from the controversial John Wilson Croker, who was a founding member of the Athenaeum Club; a close associate of the pre-eminent neoclassical architects James Burton and Decimus Burton; an advocate of neoclassicism; and a repudiator of the gothic revival style. Consequently, Peel appointed a committee chaired by Edward Cust, a detester of the style of John Nash and William Wilkins, which resolved that the new Houses of Parliament would have to be in either the 'gothic' or the 'Elizabethan' style.

Augustus W.N. Pugin, the foremost expert on the Gothic, had to submit each of his designs through, and thus in the name of, other architects, Gillespie-Graham and Charles Barry, because he had recently openly and fervently converted to Catholicism, as a consequence of which any design submitted in his own name would certainly have been automatically rejected; the design he submitted for improvements to Balliol College, Oxford, in 1843 were rejected for this reason. The design for Parliament that Pugin submitted through Barry won the competition. Subsequent to the announcement of the design ascribed to Barry, William Richard Hamilton, who had been secretary to Thomas Bruce, 7th Earl of Elgin during the acquisition of the Elgin Marbles, published a pamphlet in which he censured the fact that 'gothic barbarism' had been preferred to the masterful designs of Ancient Greece and Rome: but the judgement was not altered, and was ratified by the Commons and the Lords. The commissioners subsequently appointed Pugin to assist in the construction of the interior of the new Palace, to the design of which Pugin himself had been the foremost determiner. Pugin's biographer, Rosemary Hill, shows that Barry designed the Palace as a whole, and only he could co-ordinate such a large project and deal with its difficult paymasters, but he relied entirely on Pugin for its Gothic interiors, wallpapers and furnishings. The first stone of the new Pugin-Barry design was laid on 27 April 1840.

During the competition for the design of the new Houses of Parliament, Decimus Burton, 'the land's leading classicist', was vituperated with continuous invective, which Guy Williams has described as an 'anti-Burton campaign', by the foremost advocate of the neo-gothic style, Augustus W.N. Pugin, who was made enviously reproachful that Decimus "had done much more than Pugin's father (Augustus Charles Pugin) to alter the appearance of London". Pugin attempted to popularize advocacy of the neo-gothic, and repudiation of the neoclassical, by composing and illustrating books that contended the supremacy of the former and the degeneracy of the latter, which were published from 1835.

In 1845, Pugin, in his Contrasts: or a Parallel Between the Noble Edifices of the Fourteenth and Fifteenth Centuries and Similar Buildings of the Present Day, which the author had to publish himself as a consequence of the extent of the defamation of society architects therein, satirized John Nash as "Mr Wash, Plasterer, who jobs out Day Work on Moderate Terms", and Decimus Burton as "Talent of No Consequence, Premium Required", and included satirical sketches of Nash's Buckingham Palace and Burton's Wellington Arch. Consequently, the number of commissions received by Decimus declined, although Decimus retained a close friendship with the aristocrats amongst his patrons, who continued to commission him.

At the end of Pugin's life, in February 1852, Barry visited him in Ramsgate and Pugin supplied a detailed design for the iconic Palace clock tower, in 2012 dubbed the Elizabeth Tower but popularly known as Big Ben. The design is very close to earlier designs by Pugin, including an unbuilt scheme for Scarisbrick Hall, Lancashire. The tower was Pugin's last design before descending into madness. In her biography, Hill quotes Pugin as writing of what is probably his best-known building: "I never worked so hard in my life [as] for Mr Barry for tomorrow I render all the designs for finishing his bell tower & it is beautiful & I am the whole machinery of the clock." Hill writes that Barry omitted to give any credit to Pugin for his huge contribution to the design of the new Houses of Parliament. In 1867, after the deaths of both Pugin and Barry, Pugin's son Edward published a pamphlet, Who Was the Art Architect of the Houses of Parliament, a statement of facts, in which he asserted that his father was the "true" architect of the building and not Barry.

== Pugin in Ireland ==
Pugin was invited to Ireland by the Redmond family, initially to work in County Wexford. He arrived in Ireland in 1838 at a time of greater religious tolerance, when Catholic churches were permitted to be built. Most of his work in Ireland consisted of religious buildings. Pugin demanded the highest quality of workmanship from his craftsmen, particularly the stonemasons. His subsequent visits to the country were brief and infrequent. He was the main architect of St Aidan's Cathedral for the Diocese of Ferns in Enniscorthy, County Wexford. Pugin was the architect of the Russell Library at St. Patrick's College, Maynooth, although he did not live to see its completion. Pugin provided the initial design of St. Mary's Cathedral, Killarney.

== Pugin and Australia ==
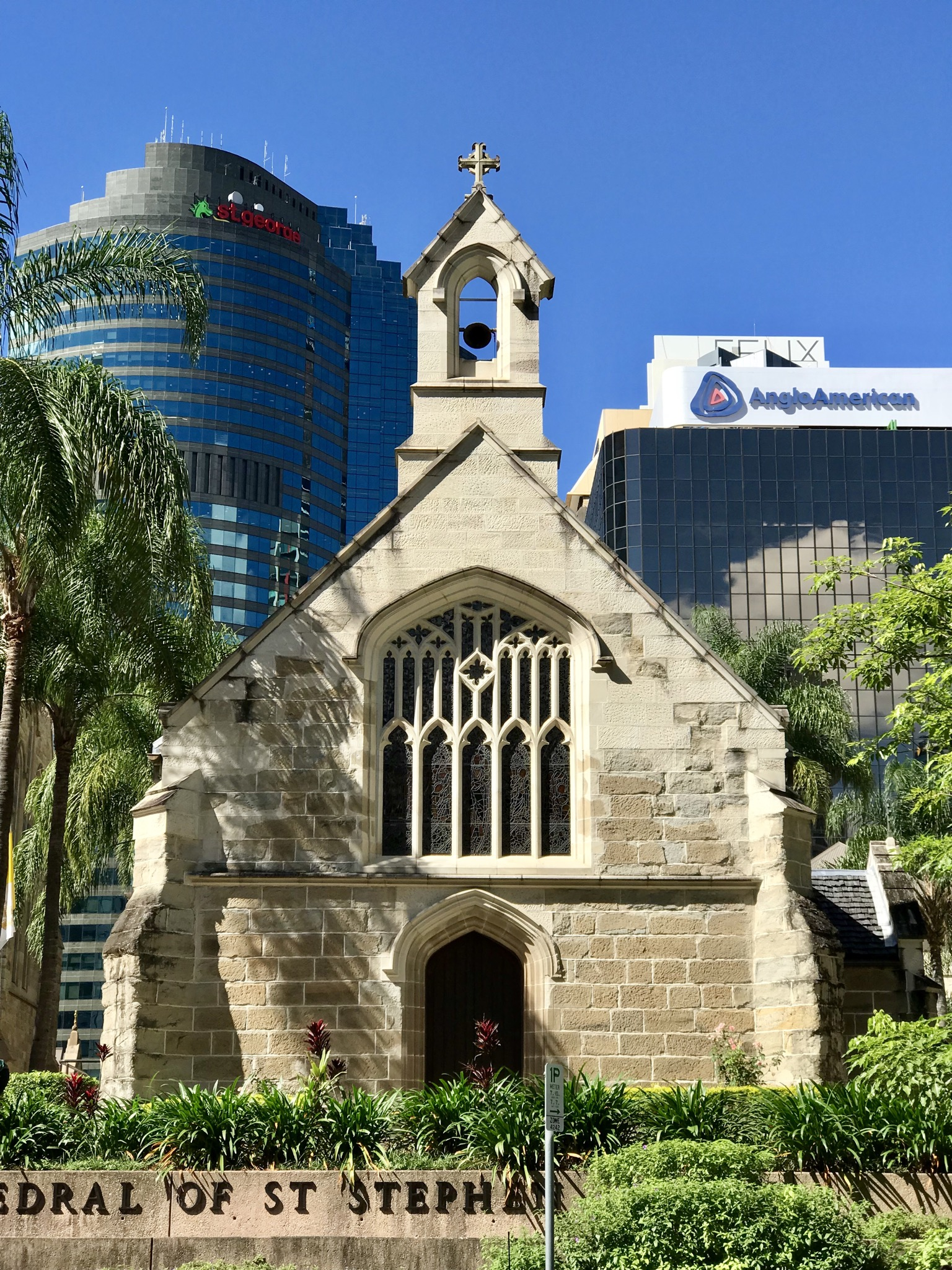
The Pugin Chapel in Brisbane, Australia, designed by Augustus Pugin and built between 1848 and 1850

The first Catholic Bishop of New South Wales, Australia, John Bede Polding, met Pugin and was present when St Chad's Cathedral, Birmingham and St Giles' Catholic Church, Cheadle were officially opened. Although Pugin never visited Australia, Polding persuaded Pugin to design a series of churches for him. Although a number of churches do not survive, St. Francis Xavier's in Berrima, New South Wales, is regarded as a fine example of a Pugin church. Polding blessed the foundation stone in February 1849, and the church was completed in 1851.

St. Stephen's Chapel, now in the cathedral grounds in Elizabeth Street, Brisbane, was built to a design by Pugin. Construction began in 1848, and the first Mass in the church was celebrated on 12 May 1850. In 1859 James Quinn was appointed Bishop of Brisbane, Brisbane became a diocese, and Pugin's small church became a cathedral. When the new Cathedral of St Stephen was opened in 1874 the small Pugin church became a schoolroom, and later church offices and storage room. It was threatened with demolition several times before its restoration in the 1990s. In Sydney, there are several altered examples of his work, namely St. Benedict's, Chippendale; St Charles Borromeo, Ryde; the former church of St Augustine of Hippo (next to the existing church), Balmain; and St Patrick's Cathedral, Parramatta, which was gutted by a fire in 1996.

According to Steve Meacham writing in The Sydney Morning Herald, Pugin's legacy in Australia is particularly of the idea of what a church should look like:

Pugin's notion was that Gothic was Christian and Christian was Gothic ... It became the way people built churches and perceived churches should be. Even today if you ask someone what a church should look like, they'll describe a Gothic building with pointed windows and arches. Right across Australia, from outback towns with tiny churches made out of corrugated iron with a little pointed door and pointed windows, to our very greatest cathedrals, you have buildings which are directly related to Pugin's ideas.

After his death, Pugin's two sons, Edward and Peter, continued operating their father's architectural firm under the name Pugin & Pugin. Their work includes most of the "Pugin" buildings in Australia and New Zealand.

== Reputation and influence ==
Charles Eastlake, writing in 1872, noted that the quality of construction in Pugin's buildings was often poor, and believed he was lacking in technical knowledge, his strength lying more in his facility as a designer of architectural detail.

Pugin's legacy began to fade immediately after his death. This was partly due to the hostility of John Ruskin. Ruskin wrote of Pugin, "he is not a great architect but one of the smallest possible or conceivable architects". Contemporaries and admirers of Pugin, including Sir Henry Cole, protested at the viciousness of the attack and pointed out that Ruskin's idea on style had much in common with Pugin's. After Pugin's death, Ruskin "outlived and out-talked him by half a century". Sir Kenneth Clark wrote, "If Ruskin had never lived, Pugin would never have been forgotten."

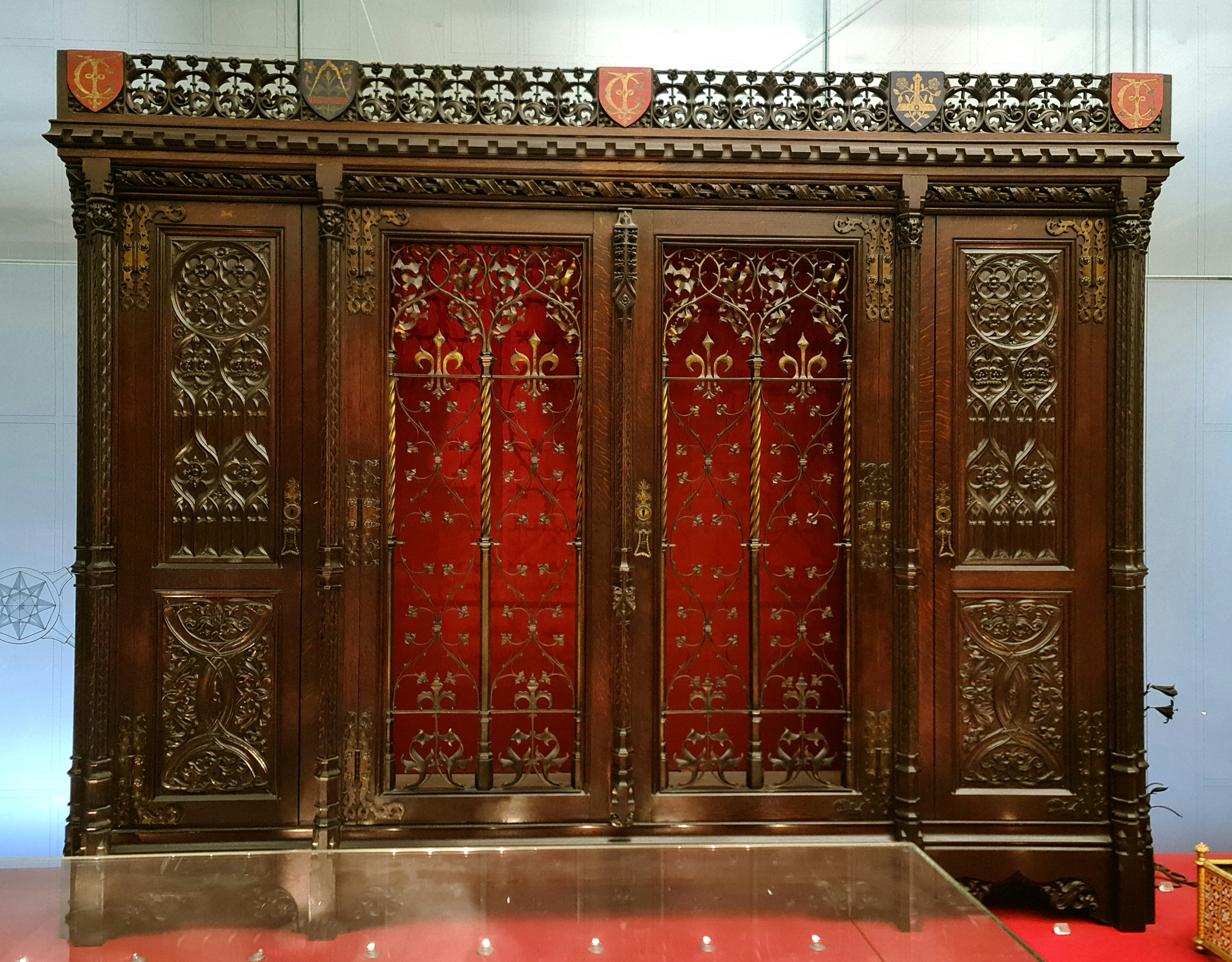
Armoire, designed in 1850 by Augustus Welby Northmore Pugin (1812–1852) and made by J.G. Crace (1809–1889).

Nonetheless, Pugin's architectural ideas were carried forward by two young architects who admired him and had attended his funeral, W. E. Nesfield and Norman Shaw. George Gilbert Scott, William Butterfield, and George Edmund Street were influenced by Pugin's designs, and continued to work out the implication of ideas he had sketched in his writings. In Street's office, Philip Webb met William Morris and they went on to become leading members of the English Arts and Crafts Movement. Morris regarded Pugin as a prominent figure in the "first act" of the Gothic revival, in which it "triumphed as an exotic ecclesiastical style", whereas in the second act, Ruskin replaced specific religious connotations with a universal, ethical stance. When the German critic Hermann Muthesius published his admiring and influential study of English domestic architecture, Pugin was all but invisible, yet "it was he ... who invented the English House that Muthesius so admired".

An armoire that he designed (crafted by frequent collaborator John Gregory Crace) is held at the Victoria and Albert Museum. It was shown at The Great Exhibition of 1851 but was not eligible for a medal, as it was shown under Crace's name and he was a judge for the Furniture Class at the exhibition.

On 23 February 2012 the Royal Mail released a first-class stamp featuring Pugin as part of its "Britons of Distinction" series. The stamp image depicts an interior view of the Palace of Westminster. Also in 2012, the BBC broadcast an arts documentary programme on Pugin's achievements.

== Pugin's principal buildings in the United Kingdom ==
=== House designs ===
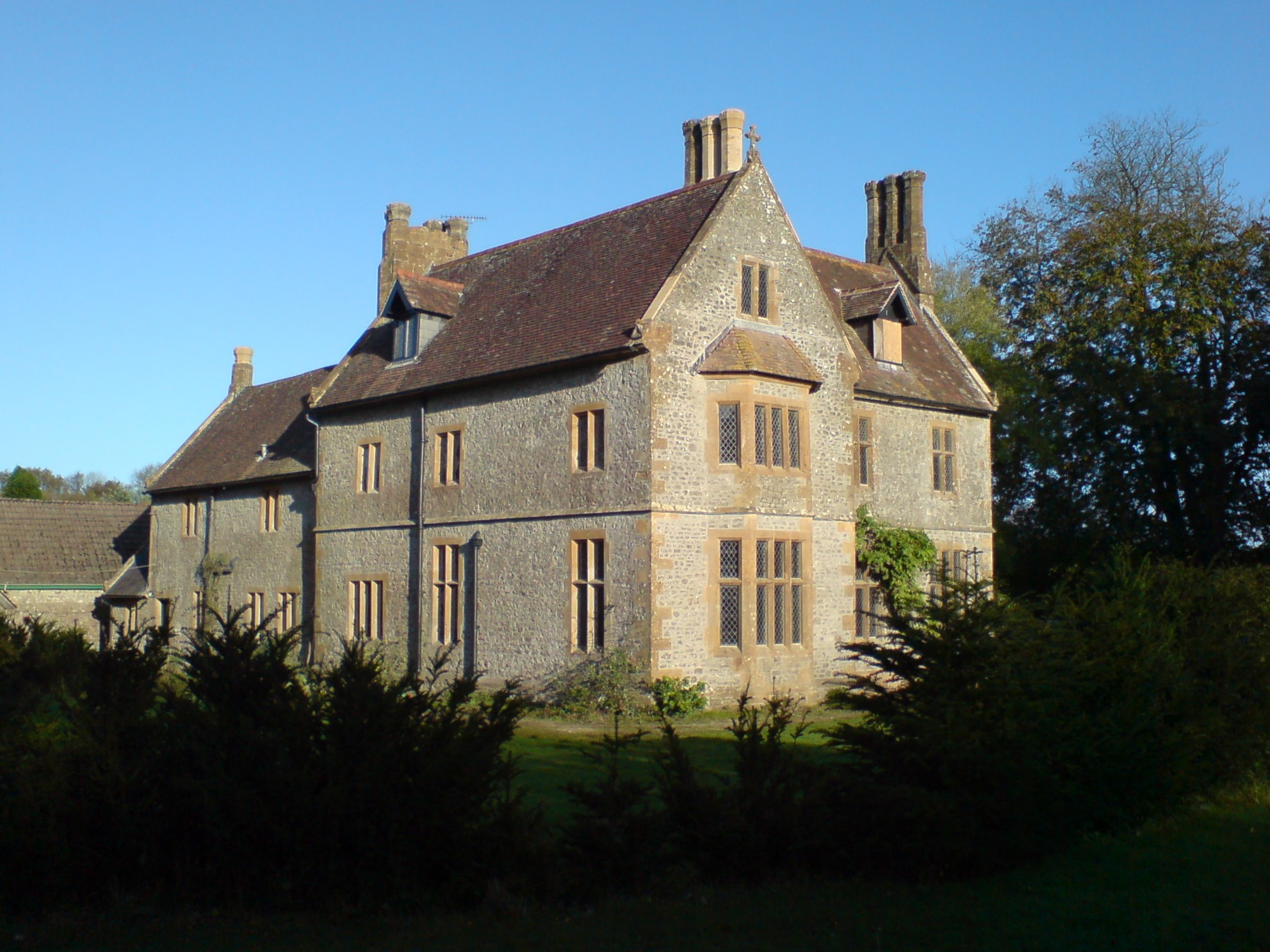
Pugin Hall, Rampisham, Dorset: Grade I listed house designed as a rectory by Pugin, built 1846–1847

Source: Pugin Society

- John Halle's Hall, Salisbury (1834) – restoration of an existing hall house of 1470, largely intact but extended prior to and following the 1834 restoration; now in use as the vestibule to a cinema
- St Marie's Grange, Alderbury, Wiltshire, for his own occupation (1835) – altered; a private house
- Oxburgh Hall (with J.C. Buckler, 1835) – restoration of a 15th-century fortified manor house, now owned by the National Trust
- Derby presbytery (1838) – demolished
- Scarisbrick Hall (1837) – largely intact; a school
- Uttoxeter presbytery (1838) – largely intact; in use
- Keighley presbytery (1838) – altered; in use
- Bishop's House, Birmingham (1840) – demolished
- Warwick Bridge presbytery (1841) – intact with minor alterations; in use
- St Barnabas Cathedral, Nottingham (1841) – intact; in use
- Garendon Hall scheme (1841) – not executed
- Bilton Grange (1841) – intact; now a school
- Oxenford Grange farm buildings (1841) – intact; private house and farm
- Cheadle presbytery (1842) – largely intact; now a private house
- Woolwich presbytery (1842) – largely intact; in use
- Brewood presbytery (1842) – largely intact; in use
- St Augustine's Grange ("The Grange"), Ramsgate (1843) – restored by the Landmark Trust
- Alton Castle (1843) – intact; a Catholic youth centre
- Alton Towers (current incarnation), Staffordshire (1840-1852) – walls almost fully intact, though largely derelict and missing most of its roof; now the centrepiece of a theme park – Banqueting Hall stained glass restored in 2021. The building's Armoury, Picture Gallery and Octagon Gallery are all used as part of a dark ride. The Pugin-designed ceilings of the Chapel (completed between 1851 and 1852) and Banqueting Hall are also restored to their original design. The chandelier from the Banqueting Hall, also a Pugin design, now hangs in the Pugin Room at the Palace of Westminster (also, of course, a Pugin interior design) after the room's redecoration in 1979. A similar one hangs in the Drawing Room at Eastnor Castle, and another similar one is at the Art Institute of Chicago, though is originally from Aldenham Abbey, which was owned by Henrietta Pole (a cousin of the then-owner of Eastnor, the Earl Somers).
- Oswaldcroft, Liverpool (1844) – altered; a residential home
- Dartington Hall scheme (1845) – unexecuted
- Lanteglos-by-Camelford rectory (1846) – much altered; now a hotel
- Pugin Hall (former Rampisham rectory) (1846–1847) – intact, unaltered; private house
- Woodchester Park scheme (1846) – unexecuted
- St Thomas of Canterbury Church, Fulham (1847)
- Fulham presbytery (1847) – intact; in use
- Leighton Hall, Powys (1847) – intact; in use
- Banwell Castle (1847) – intact; now a hotel and restaurant
- Wilburton Manor, Cambridgeshire (1848) – largely intact
- St Edmund's College Chapel (1853) – intact, a school and chapel

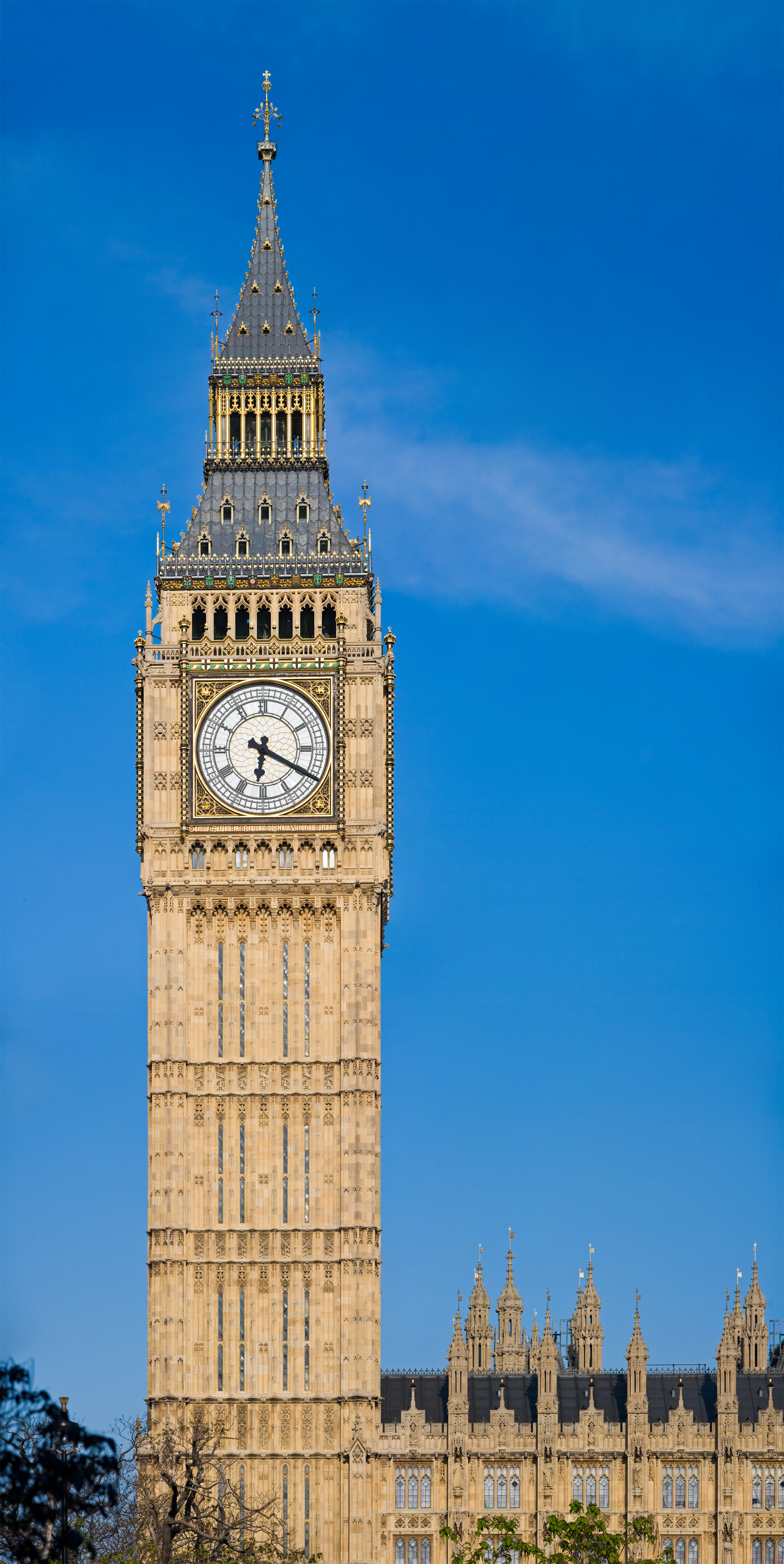
"Big Ben" (London), completed to Pugin's design

=== Institutional designs ===
- Convent of Mercy, Bermondsey (1838) – destroyed
- Mount St Bernard Abbey, Leicestershire (1839) – largely intact; in use
- King Edward's School, Birmingham, design of parts of interior (1838)
- Downside Abbey, Somerset, schemes (1839 and 1841) – unexecuted
- Convent of Mercy, Handsworth, Staffordshire (1840) – largely intact; in use
- St John's Hospital, Alton, Staffordshire (1841) – intact; in use
- Convent of St. Joseph, school and almshouses, Chelsea, London (1841) – altered; used as a school
- Convent of Mercy, Liverpool (1841 and from 1847) – demolished
- St Ann's School, Spetchley, Worcestershire, and schoolmaster's house (1841) – intact, now a private house
- Balliol College, Oxford, scheme (1843) – unexecuted
- Ratcliffe College, Leicestershire (1843) – partially executed; largely intact; in use
- Liverpool Orphanage (1843) – demolished
- Magdalen College School, Oxford, schemes (1843–1844) – unexecuted
- Convent of Mercy, Nottingham (1844) – altered; private flats
- Mercy House and cloisters, Handsworth (1844–1845) – cloisters intact; otherwise destroyed
- Cotton College, Staffordshire (1846) – alterations to the older house for use by a religious community; now derelict
- Faber RC Primary School – ordered by Frederick William Faber at the time that Cotton College was built; in use
- St Anne's Bedehouses, Lincoln, (1847) – intact; in use
- Convent of the Good Shepherd, Hammersmith, London (1848) – demolished
- Convent of St. Joseph's, Cheadle, Staffordshire (1848) – intact; private house

=== Major ecclesiastical designs ===
- St James's, Reading (1837) – altered
- St Mary's, Derby (1837) – altered
- Oscott College Chapel, Birmingham (1837–1838) – extant
- Our Lady and St. Thomas of Canterbury, Dudley (1838) – altered
- St Anne's, Keighley (1838) – altered and extended
- St Alban's, Macclesfield (1838) – extant
- St Nicholas' Chappel, Boldmere, Sutton Coldfield (1840) – demolished 1961
- St Marie's, Ducie Street, Manchester (1838) – not executed
- St Augustine's, Solihull (1838) – altered and extended
- St Marie's, Southport (1838) – altered
- St Mary's Catholic Church, Uttoxeter (1839) – altered
- St Wilfrid's, Hulme, Manchester (1839) – extant
- Chancel of St. John's, Banbury (1839) – extant
- St Chad's Cathedral, Birmingham (1839) – extant
- St Giles', Cheadle, Staffordshire (1840) – extant
- St Oswald's, Liverpool (1840) – only tower remains
- St George's Cathedral, Southwark, London (1840) – almost entirely rebuilt after World War II bombing
- Holy Trinity, Radford, Oxfordshire (1839) – extant
- Our Lady and St. Wilfred, Warwick Bridge, Cumbria (1840) – extant
- St Mary's, Brewood, Staffordshire (1840) – extant
- St Marie's, Liverpool (1841) – demolished
- St Augustine's, Kenilworth, Warwickshire (1841) – extant
- St Mary's Cathedral, Newcastle upon Tyne (1841) – extant, with tower by C. Hansom
- St Barnabas' Cathedral, Nottingham (1841) – extant
- St Mary's, Stockton-on-Tees (1841) – extant
- Jesus Chapel, Ackworth Grange, Pontefract (1841) – demolished
- St Peter's, Woolwich (1842) – extended
- St. Winifrede's, Shepshed, Leicestershire (1842) – now a private house
- Old St. Peter and St. Paul's Church, Albury Park, Surrey (mortuary chapel) (1842) – extant
- Reredos of Leeds Cathedral (1842) – transferred to rebuilt cathedral 1902; restored 2007
- St Andrew's Church, Cambridge (1843) – dismantled in 1902 and re-erected in St Ives, Cambridgeshire
- Our Lady and St. Thomas, Northampton (1844) – Subsequently, enlarged in stages forming St Mary and St Thomas RC Northampton Cathedral
- St Marie's, Wymeswold, Leicestershire (restoration) (1844) – extant
- St Wilfrid's, Cotton, Staffordshire Moorlands (1844) – extant, but redundant 2012
- St James-the-Less, Rawtenstall, Lancashire (1844) – extant; restored 1993–1995
- St Peter's, Marlow (1845) – extant
- St John the Evangelist ("The Willows"), Kirkham, Lancashire (1845) – extant
- St Augustine's, Ramsgate (1845) – extant, loss of some fittings; the only church he built entirely with his own money
- St Marie's Church, Rugby (1845) – much added to
- St Lawrence's, Tubney, Berkshire (1845) – extant
- Highland Tolbooth Kirk/Victoria Hall, Edinburgh (1845) – with James Gillespie Graham, now a Festival venue
- St Mary's, West Tofts, Norfolk (1845) – disused and inaccessible
- St Edmund's College chapel, Old Hall Green, Hertfordshire (1846) – extant
- St Thomas of Canterbury Church, Fulham (1847) – extant
- St Osmund's, Salisbury (1847) – much added to
- Chancel of St Oswald's Church, Winwick, Cheshire (1847) – extant
- Erdington Abbey, Birmingham (1848)
- Jesus College Chapel, Cambridge (1849) – restoration, extant
- Rolle Mortuary Chapel, Bicton Grange, Bicton, Devon (1850) – extant
- St Benedict Abbey (Oulton Abbey), Stone, Staffordshire (1854) – complete and in use as a nursing home
- Bolton Priory, North Yorkshire, set of six windows (1854) – extant

=== Railway cottages ===
Less grand than the above are the railway cottages at Windermere station in Cumbria which have been loosely attributed to Pugin or a follower. Believed to date from 1849, and probably some of the first houses to be built in Windermere, the terrace of cottages was built for railway executives. One of the fireplaces is a copy of one of his in the Palace of Westminster.

== Buildings in Ireland ==
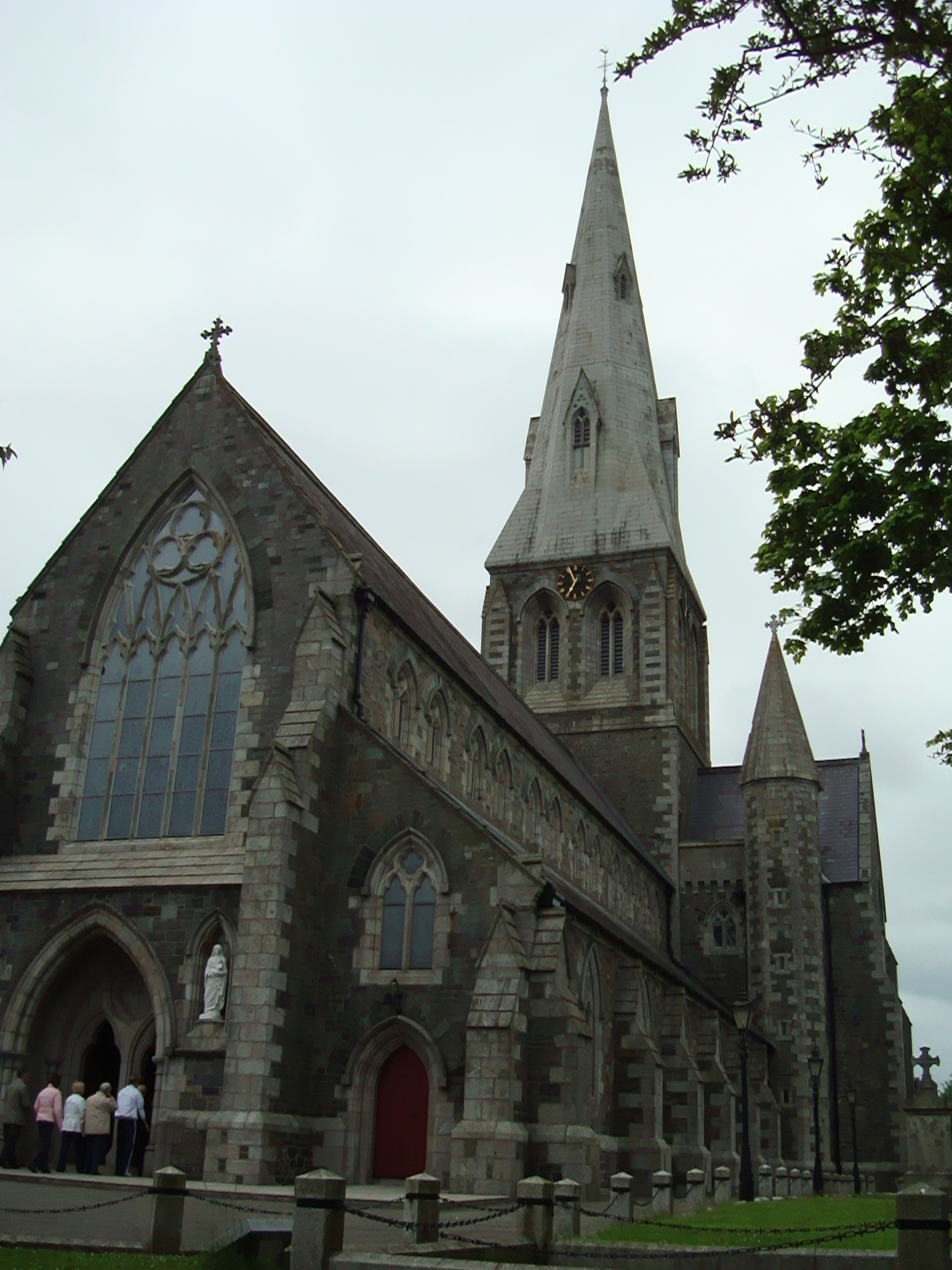
St Aidan's Cathedral, Enniscorthy, County Wexford

- Church of Assumption of Mary, Bree, County Wexford. 1837–1839. Patronage from the Redmond family
- Church of St. John the Baptist, Bellevue, Ballyhogue, County Wexford. 1859
- St. Peter's College, Summerhill Road, Wexford, County Wexford. Chapel.1838–1841; 6 bay chapel integrated as part of the college; built in Wexford red sandstone. Various Pugin elements including stations of the cross, balcony, rood screen etc. were removed in the renovation of 1950.
- Church of St. James's, Ramsgrange, County Wexford. 1838–1843
- Chapel at Loreto Abbey, Rathfarnham, Dublin. Currently vacant and out of use
- Church of St. Michael the Archangel, Gorey, County Wexford. 1839–1842. Cruciform plan in Romanesque style; 9 bay nave; low square tower over the crossing. The design may have been influenced by Dunbrody Abbey, County Wexford. Built in Ballyscartin limestone with Wicklow granite dressings. Spire not constructed. Patronage of Sir Thomas Esmonde, 9th Baronet and family
- Loreto Convent, St Michael's Road, Gorey, County Wexford. 1842–1844
- St. Mary's Cathedral, Killarney, County Kerry. 1842–1856. Cruciform early English style in limestone. Much modified. 12 bay nave and spire over the crossing completed by others.
- Two Villas, Cobh, County Cork. 1842 for George Brodrick, 5th Viscount Midleton
- Church of St. Mary's, Tagoat, County Wexford. 1843–1848. Cruciform plan. 5 bay nave and aisles. Contains Pugin brasses, tiles etc. Damaged in fire 1936
- St Aidan's Cathedral, Enniscorthy, County Wexford. 1843–1860. Cruciform plan
- Church of St. Alphonsus or Blessed Virgin Mary, Barntown, County Wexford. 1844–1848. 7 bay church with nave and aisles. Scissors roof truss. Design may be based on St Michael's Church, Longstanton, Cambridgeshire. Interior much modified
- Houses, Midleton, County Cork. For Viscount Midleton. 1845
- St. Patrick's College, Maynooth, County Kildare. 1845–1850. Quadrangles
- Presentation Convent, Waterford, County Waterford. Quadrangle and internal cloister
- Presentation Monastery, Port Road, Killarney, County Kerry. 1846–1862
- Adare Manor, Adare, County Limerick. 1846. Alterations including hall ceiling, staircase, gallery etc.
- St. John's Convent of Mercy, Birr, County Offaly. 1846–1856. Completed by E. W. Pugin

== See also ==
- Mintons
- John Dibblee Crace

== Sources ==
- Andrews, Brian (2001). Creating a Gothic Paradise: Pugin at the antipodes (exhibition catalogue). Hobart, TAS, AU: Tasmanian Museum and Art Gallery.
- Clark, Kenneth (1962). The Gothic Revival: An Essay in the History of Taste. Holt, Rinehart & Winston.
- Eastlake, Charles Locke (1872). A History of the Gothic Revival. London, UK: Longmans, Green & Company.
- Ferrey, Benjamin (1861). Recollections of A. Welby N. Pugin, and his father Augustus Pugin. London, UK: Edward Stanford.
- Fisher, Michael; Wedgwood, Alexandra (2002). Pugin-Land: A.W.N. Pugin, Lord Shrewsbury and the Gothic Revival in Staffordshire. Stafford Fisher.
- Fisher, Michael (2012). Gothic for Ever! Pugin, Lord Shrewsbury, and the rebuilding of Gothic England. Reading, UK: Spire Books. ISBN 978-1-904965-36-7.
- Hasted, Rachel (1995) [1984]. Scarisbrick Hall: A guide. Social History. Lancashire County Museum Service.
- Hill, Rosemary. "Augustus Welby Northmore Pugin: A biographical sketch". A.W.N. Pugin: Master of Gothic revival. New Haven, CT / London, UK: Yale University Press.
- Hill, Rosemary (2007). God's Architect: Pugin and the building of romantic Britain. Allen Lane. ISBN 978-0-7139-9499-5.
- Pugin, A.W.N. (1920). Gothic Architecture selected from various Ancient Edifices in England. Vol. 1 and 2. Cleveland, OH: J.H. Jansen. (Published in five volumes between 1821 and 1838).
- Pugin, A.W.N. (1836). Contrasts. London, UK: Charles Dolman – via Google books. "A parallel between the noble edifices of the fourteenth and fifteenth centuries and similar buildings of the present day. Shewing the present decay of taste. Accompanied by appropriate text."
