= Armoire (Augustus Pugin) =

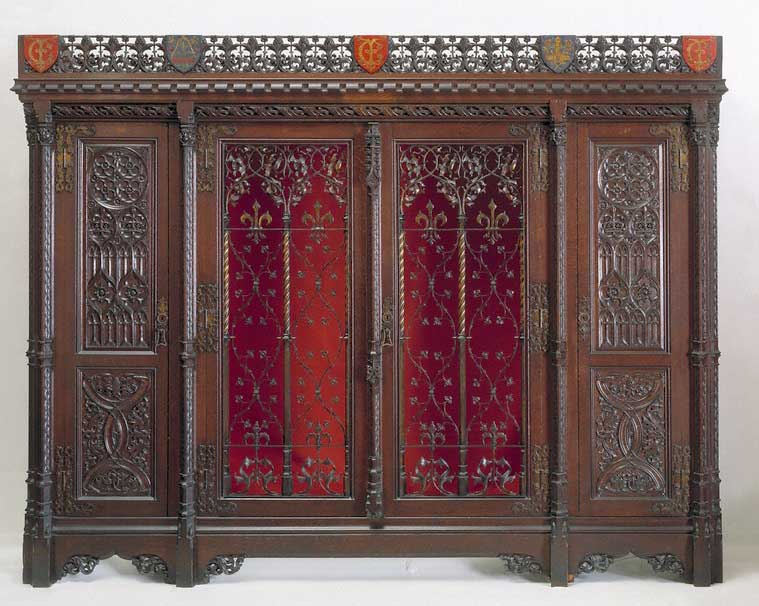
Armoire, designed in 1850 by Pugin and made by John Gregory Crace (1809–89) Victoria and Albert Museum no. 25:1 to 3-1852

This 'Armoire', displayed at the Great Exhibition of 1851, was designed by Augustus Pugin (1812–52), and made by frequent collaborator John Gregory Crace (1809–1889).

== History and description ==
The cabinet was the grandest piece in the group of furniture designed by Pugin and made by Crace for the Medieval Court in the Great Exhibition of 1851. As Crace was a judge for Class XXVI (furniture) and the cabinet was exhibited in his name, it was not eligible for a medal.

The shields along the top and the carved decorative motifs were drawn from medieval sources. The motifs include Crace's initials, a plummet (carpenter's tool) as an emblem of his honesty, and a compass to indicate his ability to keep within his estimates. Many designers of the Victorian period were inspired by the art of the Middle Ages, but Pugin was probably the greatest and most ardent exponent of the Gothic Revival style.

A prolific designer, best remembered for his decoration of the Houses of Parliament, Pugin exhausted himself and died the year after this cupboard was made, aged only forty. The Victoria and Albert Museum bought the cupboard directly from the 1851 Exhibition, making it one of its earliest acquisitions.

== Bibliography ==
- Jackson, Anna, ed. (2001). V&A: A Hundred Highlights. V&A Publications. ISBN 1-85177-365-7
