= St Thomas of Canterbury Church, Fulham =

St Thomas of Canterbury Church
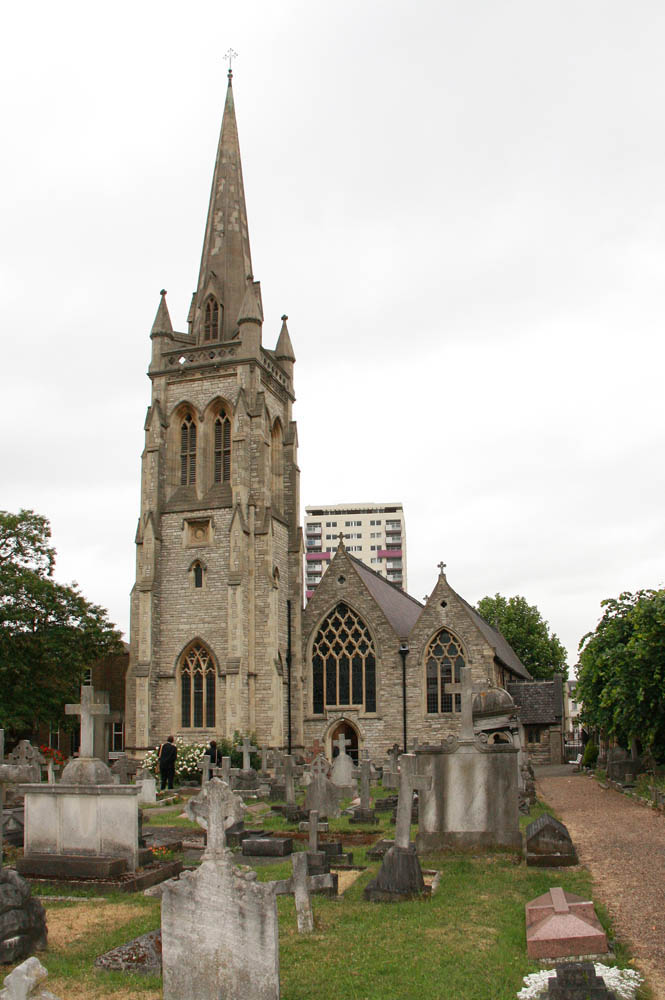
- St Thomas of Canterbury Church, Rylston Road
- St Thomas of Canterbury Church
- 51°28′54″N 0°12′21″W
- Location: Fulham, London SW6
- Country: England
- Denomination: Roman Catholic
- Religious order: Diocesan
- Website: https://stthomasfulham.com/

History
- Former name: St Thomas à Becket of Canterbury
- Status: Parish church
- Founded: 1847
- Founder: Mrs Elizabeth Bowden
- Dedication: St Thomas of Canterbury
- Consecrated: 1847

Architecture
- Functional status: Active
- Heritage designation: Grade II*
- Designated: 1970
- Architect: Augustus Pugin
- Style: Gothic Revival
- Completed: 1848

Administration
- Archdiocese: Westminster

Clergy
- Archbishop: Most Rev. Vincent Nichols

St Thomas of Canterbury Church, also known as St Thomas's, Rylston Road, is a Roman Catholic parish church in Fulham, central London. Designed in the Gothic Revival style by Augustus Pugin in 1847, the building is Grade II* listed with Historic England. It stands at 60 Rylston Road, Fulham, next to Pugin's Grade II listed presbytery, the churchyard, and St Thomas's primary school, also largely by Pugin, close to the junction with Lillie Road in the borough of Hammersmith and Fulham.

== History ==
The church, founded in memory of J. W. Bowden (1798–1844) by his widow Elizabeth Bowden (1805–1896), was begun in 1847 and is the only complete Pugin church in London. The first purpose-built Roman Catholic place of worship in Fulham since the English Reformation, its foundation stone was laid by Bishop Thomas Griffiths, Vicar Apostolic of the London District in 1847. After the latter's death that same year, the church was opened in 1848 by John Henry Newman. It was intended for the many Catholic families employed in the local market gardens.

Pugin's design was in the Decorated English Gothic of the late 13th to early 14th centuries. Féret, the chronicler of Fulham, describes in detail the interior of the building, emphasising the reredoses of the two side chapels carved in Caen stone and the striking stained glass windows. The north-west tower and pinnacled steeple rises to 142 feet and faces the small cemetery opened in 1849.

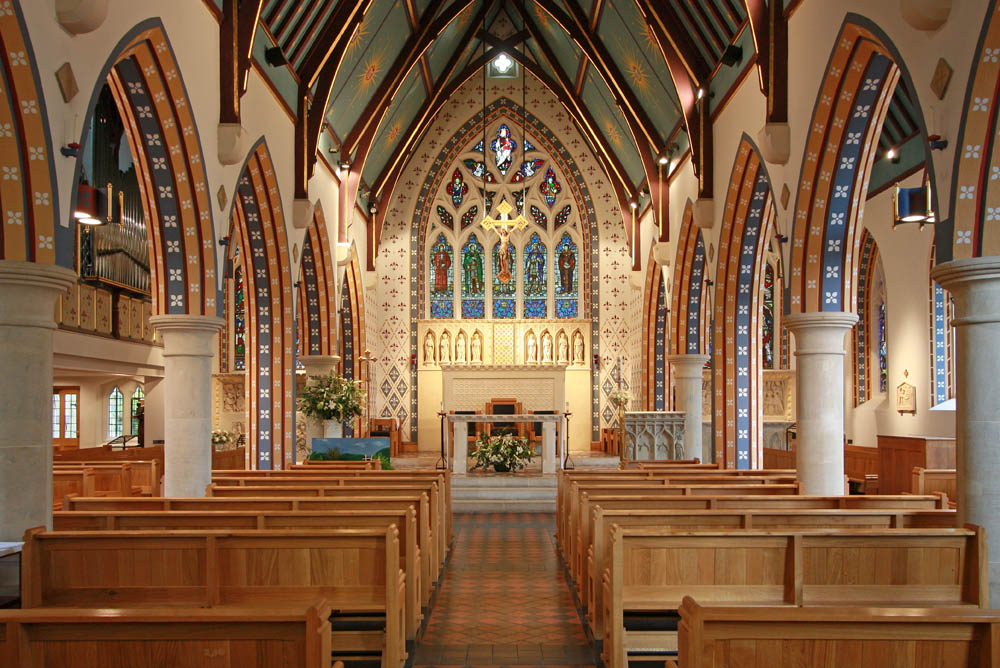
Interior

== Rectors ==
- 1842-1847 Rev. William Kelly †
- 1847-1856 Rev. Thomas Tierney Fergusson D.D. †
- 1856-1857 Rev. John Morris †
- 1857-1861 Rev. Frederick Rymer †
- 1861-1864 Rev. George Rolfe †
- 1864-1873 Rev. William Peter Bond †
- 1873-1888 Rev. Alexius Mills †
- 1888-1899 Rev. Patrick Fenton †
- 1899-1930 Rev. John Crowley †
- 1930-1935 Rev. William Write †
- 1935-1939 Rev. Joseph Warren M.A. †
- 1939-1947 Rev. Ernest Dominic Hanifin †
- 1947-1953 Rev. Charles Flood †
- 1953-1967 Rev. John Shaw †
- 1967-1970 Rev. Victor Guazzelli †
- 1970- Rev. Edward Bilsborrow †

== The cemetery ==
Among the notable burials in the churchyard are the following: Sir Thomas Henry, Chief Magistrate of London; the politician Lord Alexander Gordon-Lennox and his wife Emily; Mrs Elizabeth Bowden, benefactress of St Thomas's church and attached school, and her daughter; the architect Joseph Aloysius Hansom, designer of numerous church buildings including Our Lady of Dolours, Chelsea, as well as of the Hansom cab and founder of the influential journal The Builder; Herbert Gribble, architect of Brompton Oratory; and Joseph Scoles, designer of Church of the Immaculate Conception, Farm Street. In addition to several mayors and aldermen of the Metropolitan Borough of Fulham, in 1911, 1912 and 1918, three infant great-grandchildren of Charles Dickens were buried there. There are three World War I officer casualties laid to rest at the cemetery. There is also a war memorial with the names of 59 parishioners who died in the First World War. The war memorial, the tombstone of Warrington Taylor and the Harwath Mausoleum in this small walled cemetery are Grade II listed with Historic England.

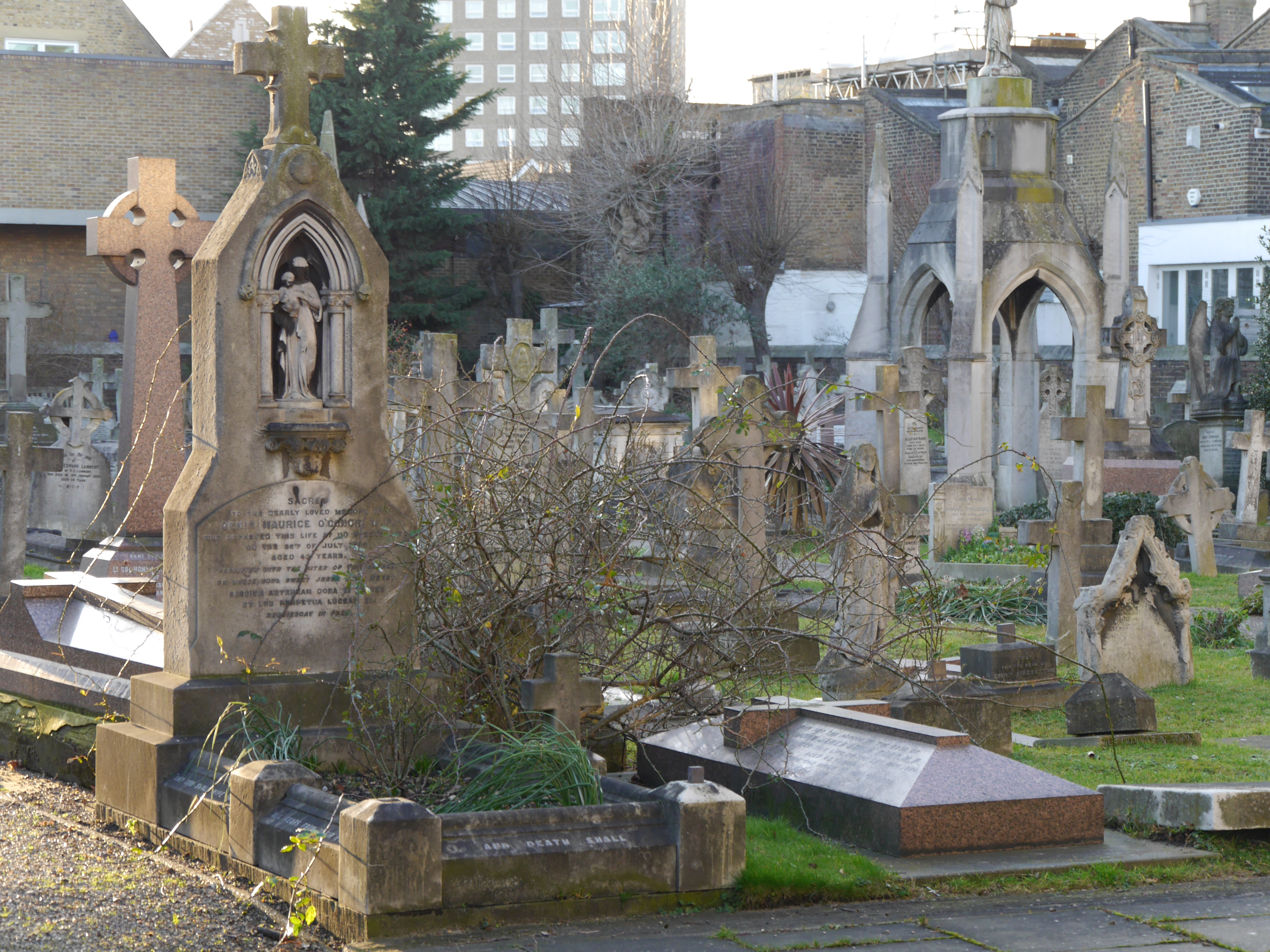
St Thomas of Canterbury churchyard
