= St Peter's Roman Catholic Church, Woolwich =

Coordinates: 51.4882°N 0.0666°E

St Peter's Church
- RC Church of St Peter the Apostle
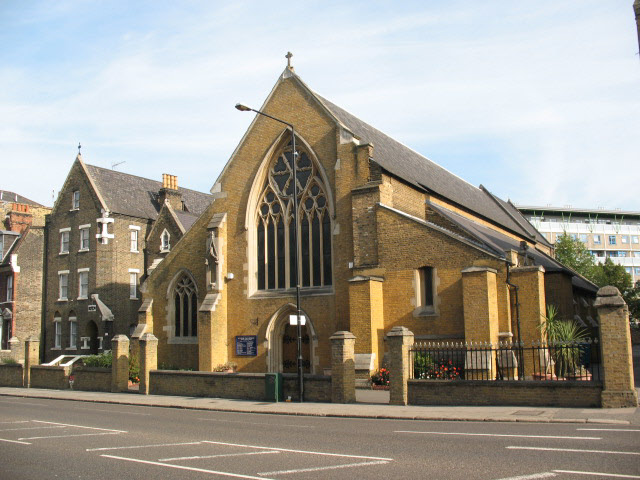
- View from Woolwich New Road of the church and the presbytery

- Location within the Royal Borough of Greenwich
- OS grid reference: TQ4358178612
- Location: Woolwich, London
- Country: England
- Denomination: Catholic
- Website: stpeterswoolwich.church

History
- Status: Church
- Founded: 26 October 1842
- Founder: Rev. Cornelius Coles
- Dedication: Saint Peter the Apostle
- Dedicated: 26 October 1843
- Consecrated: 1944

Architecture
- Functional status: Active
- Heritage designation: Grade II
- Designated: 8 June 1973
- Architect: Augustus Pugin (enlarged by Frederick Walters)
- Style: Gothic Revival
- Completed: 1843 (enlarged 1889)

Administration
- Province: Southwark
- Archdiocese: Southwark
- Deanery: Greenwich

Clergy
- Archbishop: Most Rev. John Wilson

St Peter's Church is a Catholic church in Woolwich, South East London. It is situated between Woolwich New Road and Brookhill Road, the main entrance being on Woolwich New Road. The church was designed by Augustus Pugin in 1841–42 in the style of the Gothic Revival and is one of only three Pugin churches in London. Pugin's design remained unfinished as the projected tower and spire were never built. The parish of St Peter the Apostle serves the Catholic community of central Woolwich and surrounding areas, and is part of the Archdiocese of Southwark which is in the Province of Southwark.

== History ==
=== Catholics in Woolwich ===
In the late 18th and early 19th century, Catholic emancipation gave Catholics in Britain and Ireland more freedom to worship and establish schools and churches. Early on, the Catholic mission in Woolwich mainly served the needs of Catholic prisoners held on prison hulks moored in the Thames near the Royal Arsenal. In 1793 the mission consisted largely of poor families, some of them employed at the Arsenal, as well as Irish soldiers stationed at the Royal Artillery Barracks and other Woolwich barracks. At first, the mission used a small chapel in Greenwich; from 1816 an unauthorized chapel in Sun Alley (now Sunbury Street) in Woolwich. By then, the Woolwich congregation had its own priest: Father James Delaney. In 1818 a former Methodist chapel opposite the current Woolwich Arsenal station was rededicated. It had a capacity of 400. Ten years later a Catholic school was established. In 1838 a young priest named Cornelius Coles, London-born but probably of Irish or Belgian origin, was stationed in Woolwich. His principle tasks became establishing a new church for the growing congregation (estimated at 3,000 in 1841) and a school for its children which even in 1855, according to Coles, suffered persecution in the barrack schools.

=== Construction of the church ===
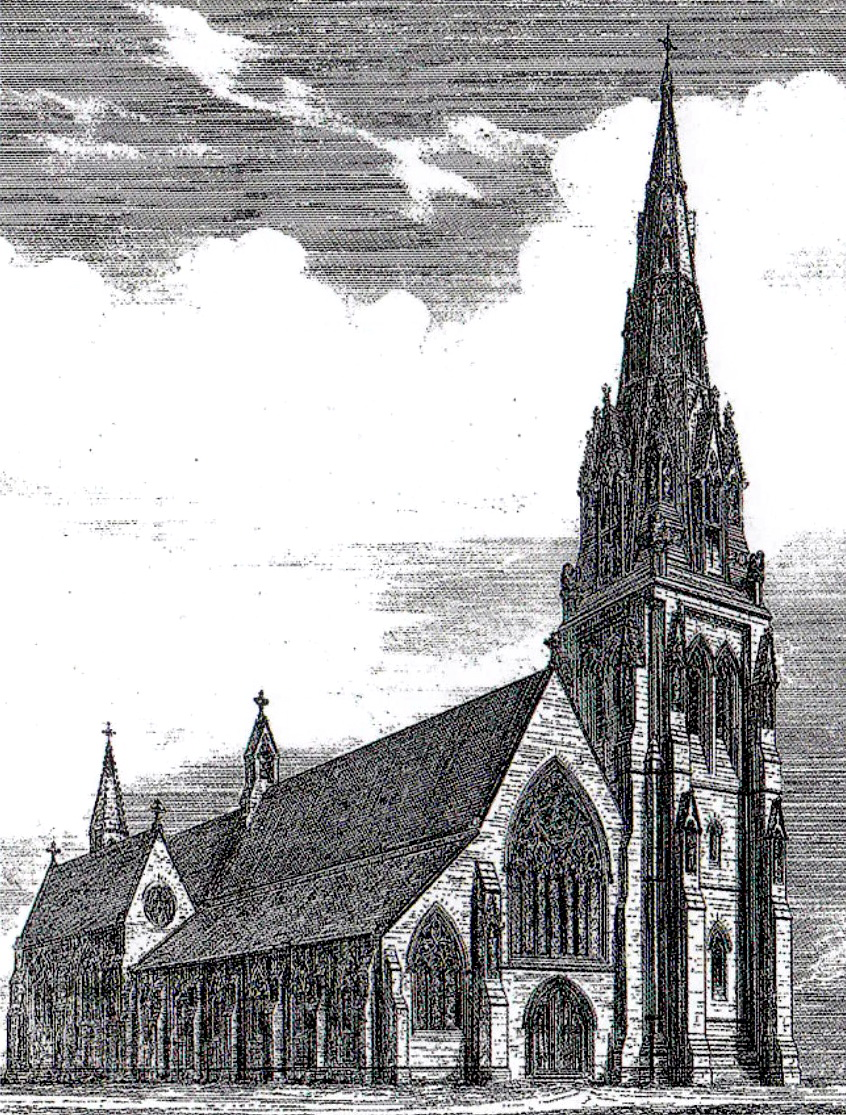
Pugin's design, 1842

In February 1841 a plot of land on Woolwich New Road, next to The Gun public house, was made available free of charge to the Woolwich Catholics by the Board of Ordnance. In September of that year the commission for the design of the new church was given to the young architect Augustus Welby Northmore Pugin (1812-1852). It is possible that Coles knew Pugin from his previous post at Holy Trinity in Bermondsey, where the architect had built a monastery in 1838. Few of Pugin's letters mention St Peter's (he was working simultaneously on St George's Cathedral, Southwark, a much more prestigious commission). However, his published correspondence includes extracts from letters of Father Cole, indicating Pugin's keen interest in the furnishings.

The foundation stone of the Catholic church was laid on 26 October 1842, the first time in London that such a ceremony was performed openly since the Reformation. Only a year before, the foundation stone for St George's Cathedral in Southwark had been laid in secrecy at 7 in the morning, since a Protestant backlash was feared. Perhaps the knowledge that there would be a large number of Irish soldiers attending the ceremony in Woolwich gave the priest and the congregation confidence. The church was built in 1842-43 by local builder George Myers. Myers used yellow London stock brick with Bath stone dressings and slate roofs. Because of the limited budget, the church was built in phases and the architectural design had to remain sober - no transept, no clerestory, with limited dressings. The initial cost for building the nave and aisles was £4,000, of which Thomas Griffiths, Vicar Apostolic of London, paid £1,000.

Pugin also designed the sacristy and presbytery in 1845–6. The Lady Chapel, smaller than in Pugin's original design, was added in 1850. In 1858 Pugin's son Edward Welby Pugin (1834-1875) built the school. The chancel and south chapel, in keeping with Pugin's plans and manner, were added in 1887-89 by the Scottish architect Frederick Walters (1849-1931), who also did further work on St George's Cathedral, Southwark.

=== Recent history ===
In May 2019 the church became part of a conservation area. The Woolwich Conservation Area comprises parts of Woolwich New Road (including St Peter's), the Bathway Quarter, General Gordon Square, Greens End, Beresford Square, Powis Street, Hare Street, Mortgramit Square, parts of Woolwich High Street (south) and St Mary's Church and Gardens.

== The buildings ==
=== Church exterior ===
The most striking feature of the exterior is perhaps the absence of the planned south-west tower, which gives the church an unbalanced appearance. Pugin believed Gothic architecture celebrated asymmetry, and for that reason he planned the tower at a corner rather than in the centre of the western façade. The aisles are supported by stepped buttresses. At the east end angled buttresses were used. The south aisle portal features the more elaborate decorations with crockets and ball flowers. The west portal, which is now the main entrance, is smaller and more sparsely decorated. The east and west end both have large traceried windows. All other windows are smaller.

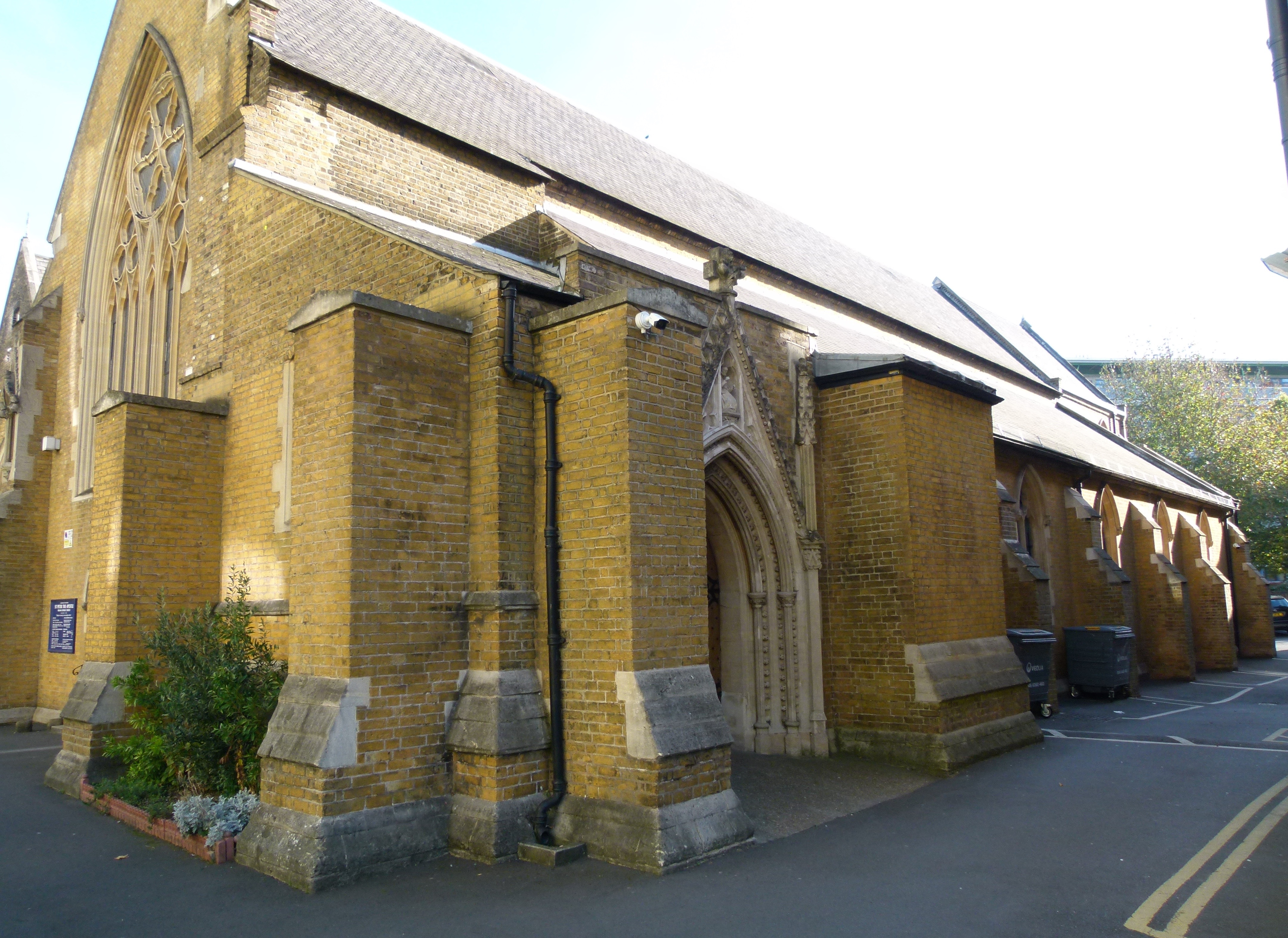
Abutted tower from the south-west

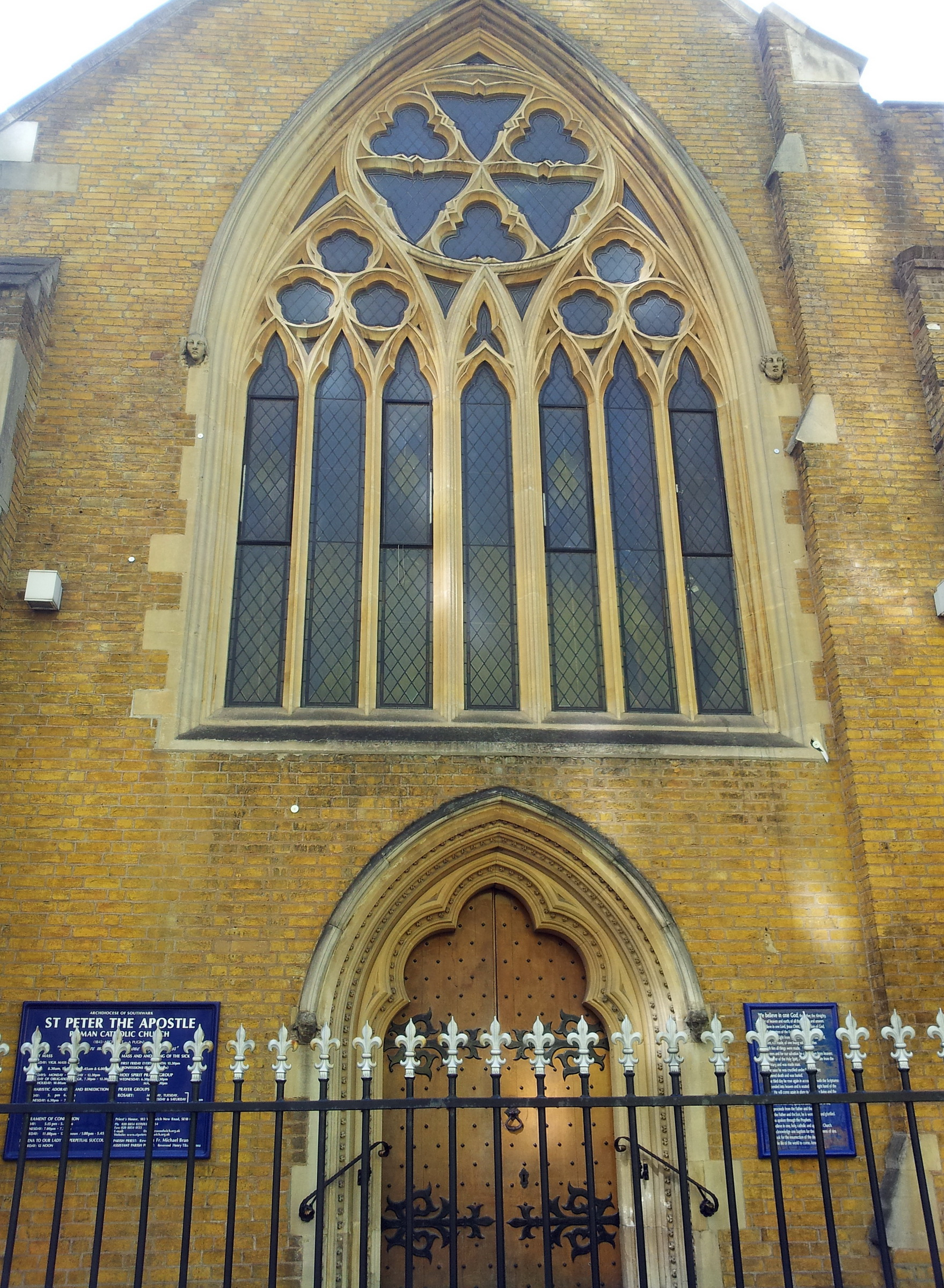
Detail west façade, Woolwich New Road

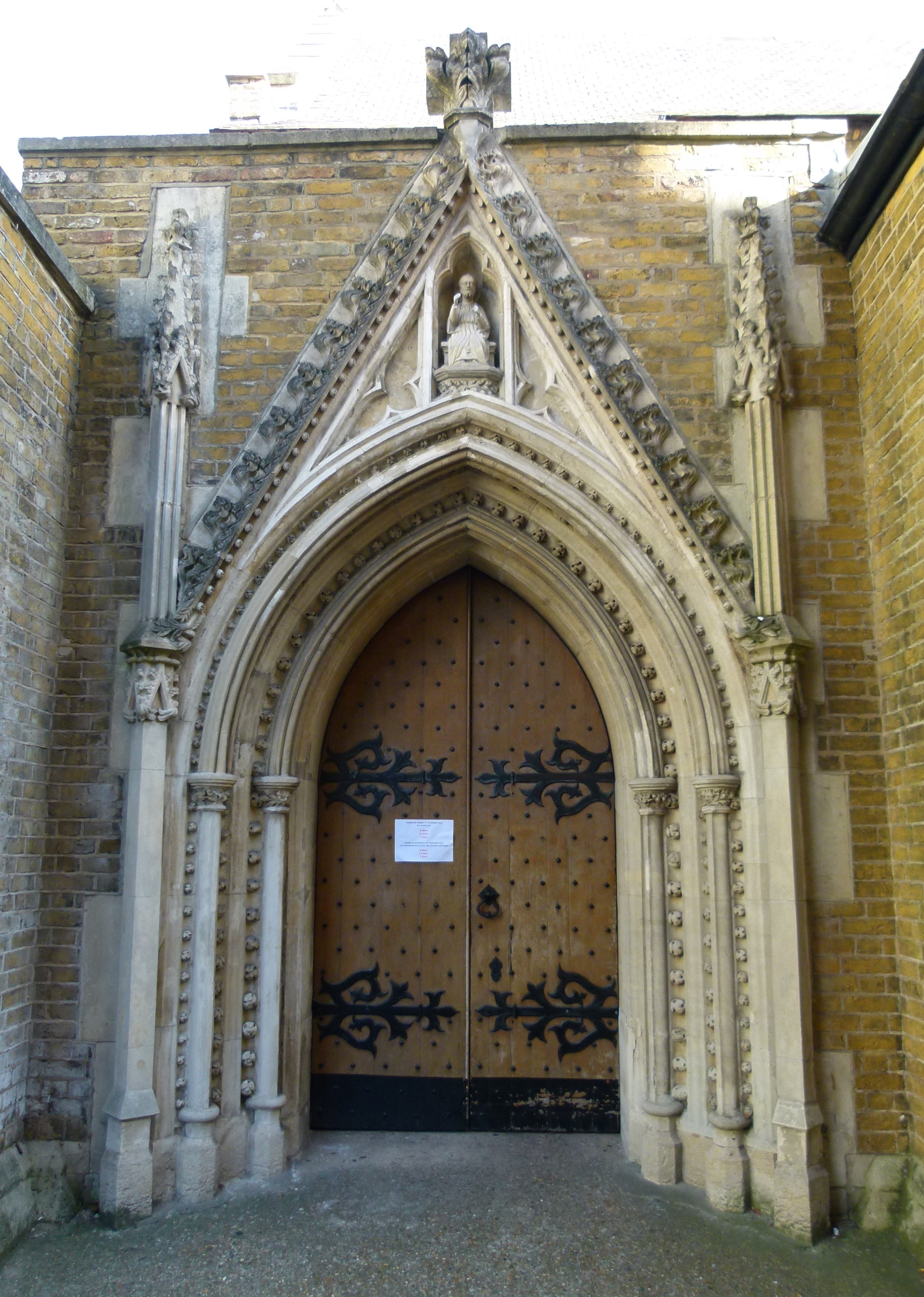
South portal

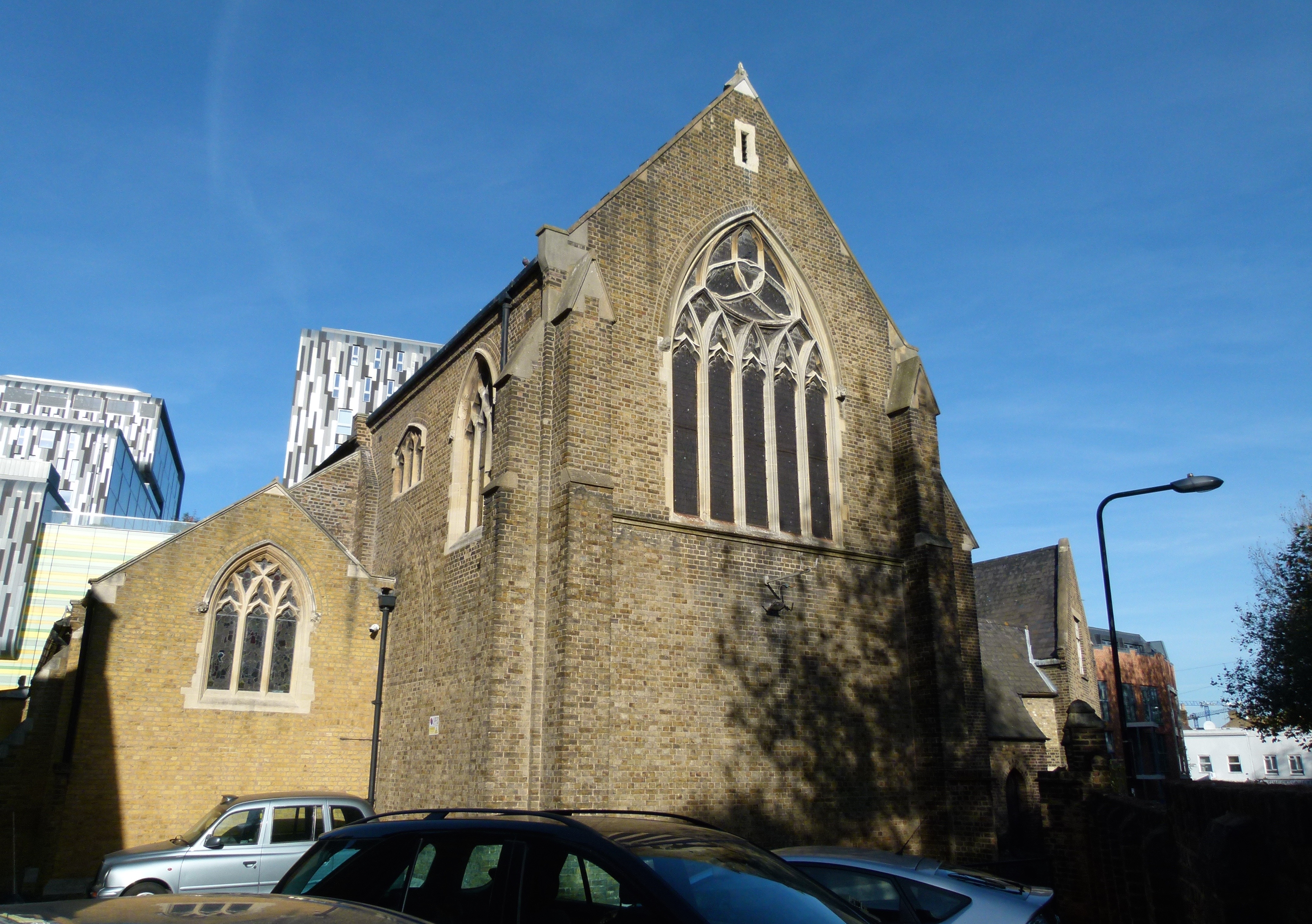
Chancel & south chapel from Brookhill Road

=== Church interior ===
The 6-bay interior uses a revival of the decorated Gothic style of around 1300, or, as Pugin preferred to call it, the style of Edward I. Like other Pugin churches of the period, the roof ridges rise at a sharp angle; there are no galleries and no clerestory windows, which makes the church rather dark. In an attempt to counterbalance this, the interior has been painted white and mint green, described in Volume 44 of the Survey of London as "gaudy" and "alien to Pugin's aesthetic". The westernmost bay of the nave was separated off from the rest of the church by a timber-and-glass partitioning wall, creating a porch with two side rooms serving as a side chapel and a church shop. Between the nave and side aisles, pointed arches rest on quatrefoil piers. The plainness of the nave contrasts with the richness of the chancel, the original 1840s altar and traceried stone reredos, which may be partly original. The choir screen intended by Pugin was never built. The 1850 Lady Chapel is smaller than Pugin had planned, but it has an original ensemble of altar, reredos, tiles by Mintons and a stained glass window by Hardman & Co. The chancel itself was not built until 1887–90. The east window however was designed by Pugin and initially placed in a temporary wall closing off the nave. Its stained glass was produced by Lavers, Barraud and Westlake in 1909. After the Second Vatican Council (1962–65), the pulpit and altar rails were removed and a forward altar added.

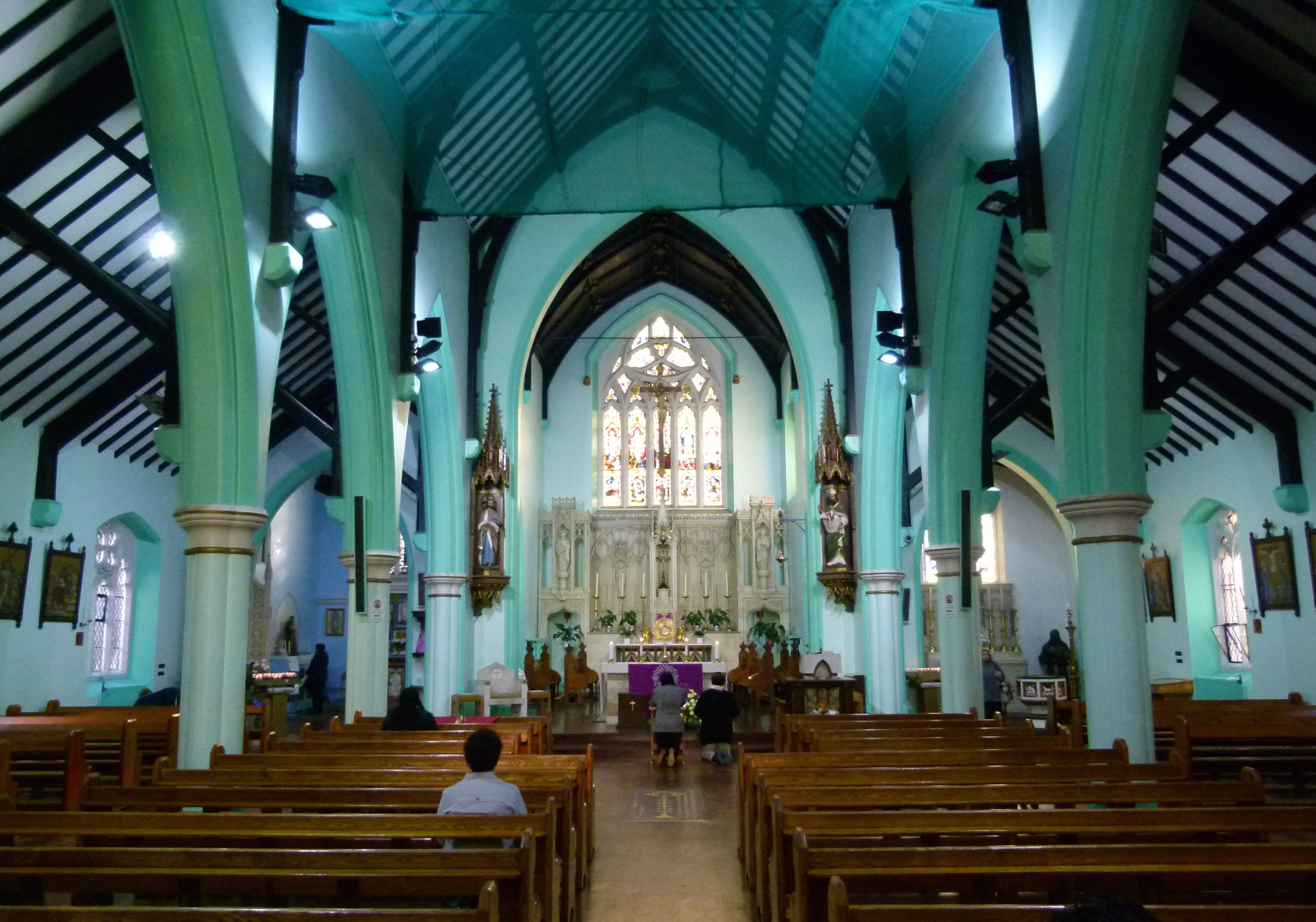
View towards the east

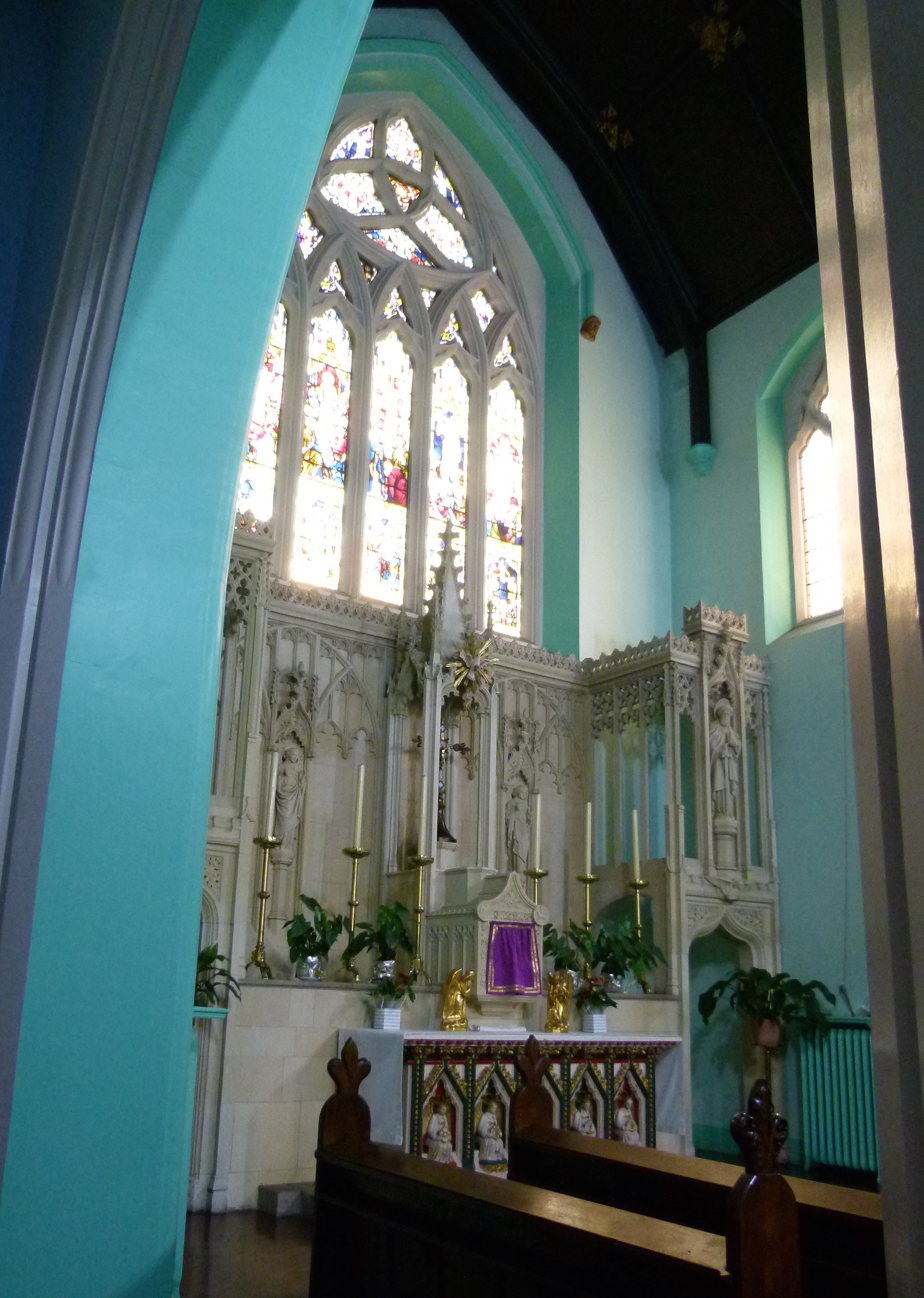
Chancel and main altar

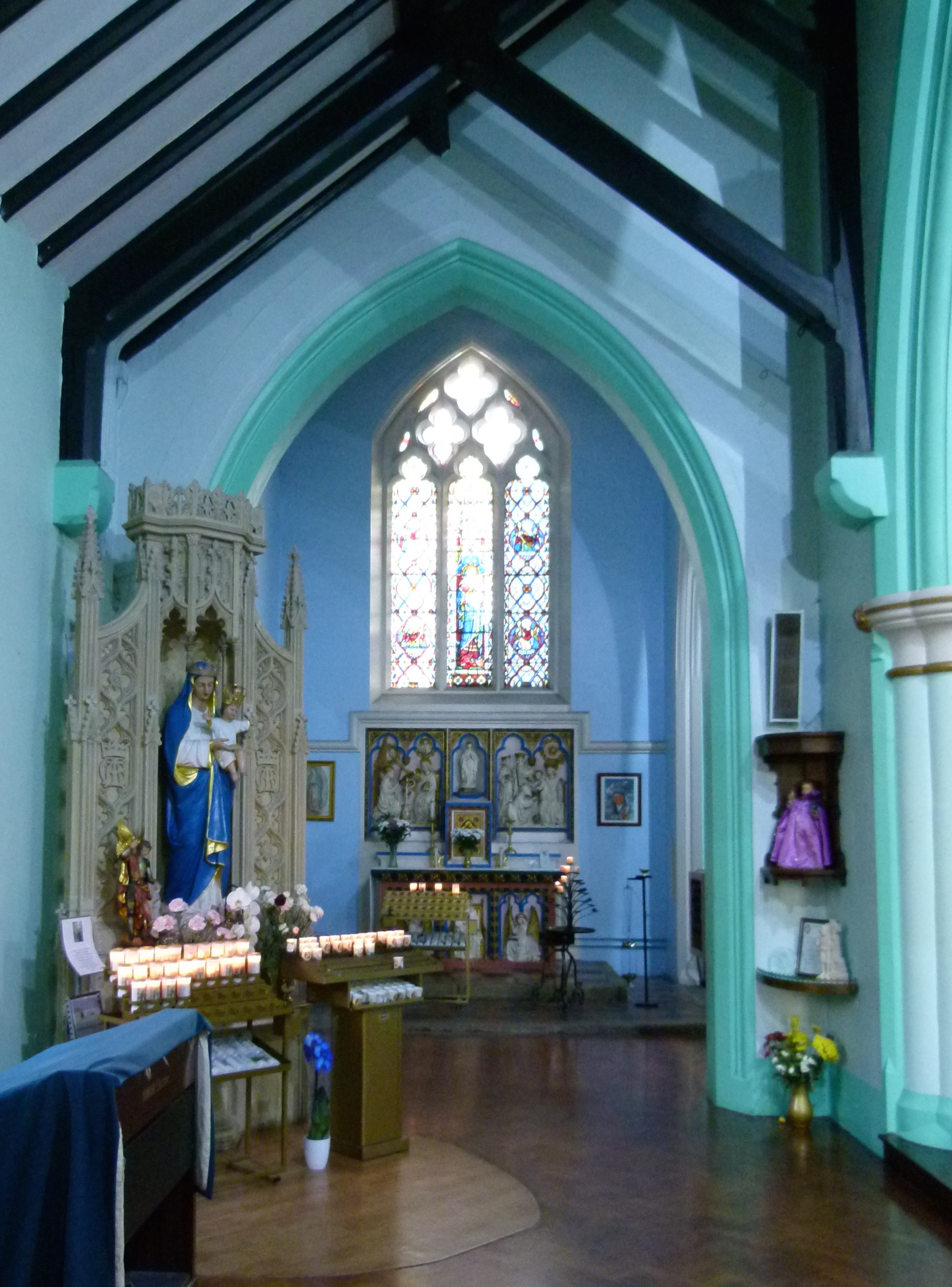
Chapel of Our Lady

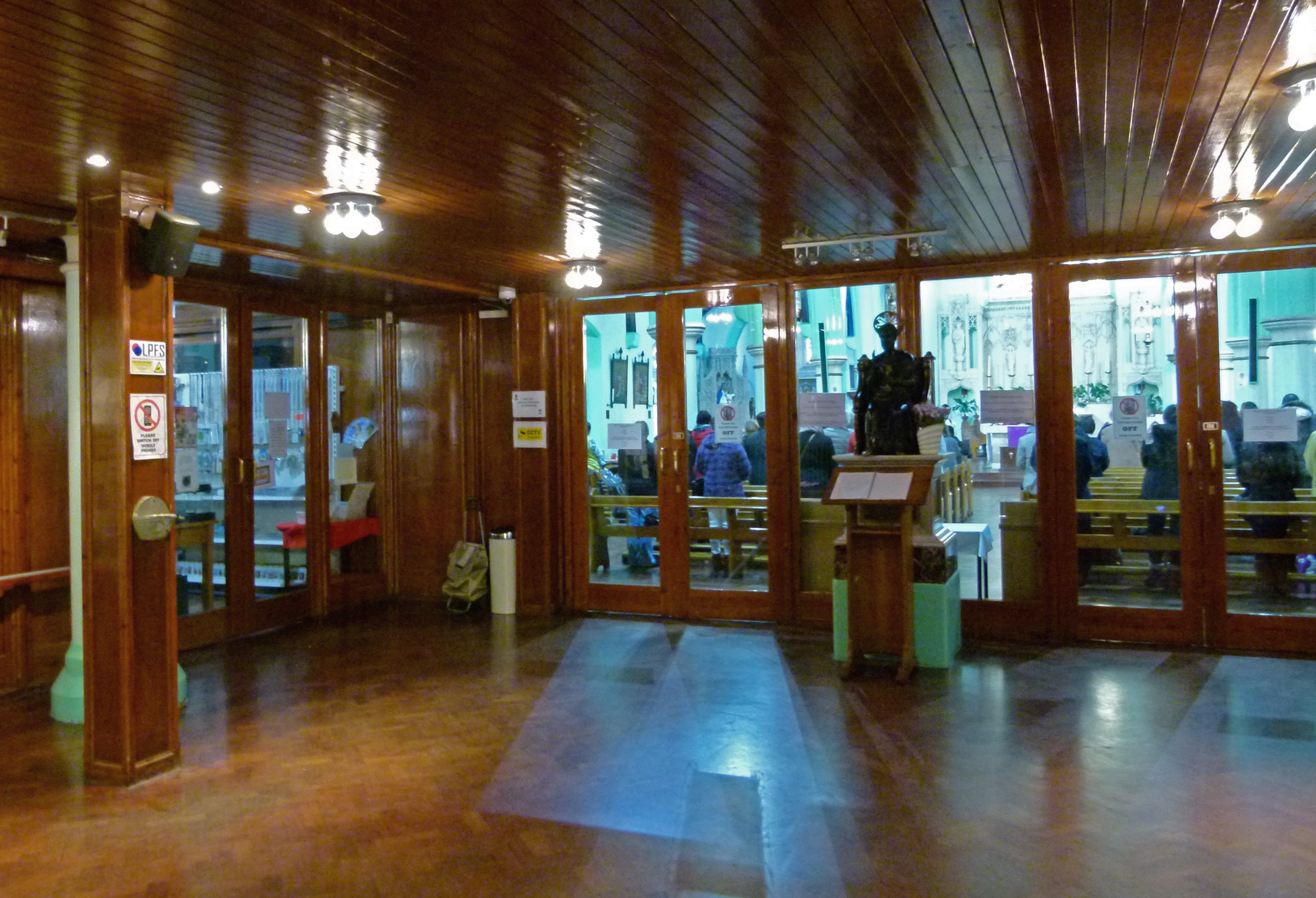
Porch area and shop

=== Presbytery and school ===
The original presbytery is a small building designed by Pugin around 1842 and built by Myers in 1846. The Survey of London describes it as "one of Pugin's best small brick secular buildings, plain but fetchingly proportioned". In 1870, a much larger building designed by John Crawley was added to its north, coarser than the older house and rather overshadowing it. At the back of the new presbytery was a music room which was later connected to the sacristy built by Pugin. The school building to the south of the church was designed by E. W. Pugin in 1858, although both the front and the back have been severely altered. A separate infant school at the back was built in 1871 but was altered as well. The former building is now the parish hall: St Peter's Centre; the latter building stands empty.

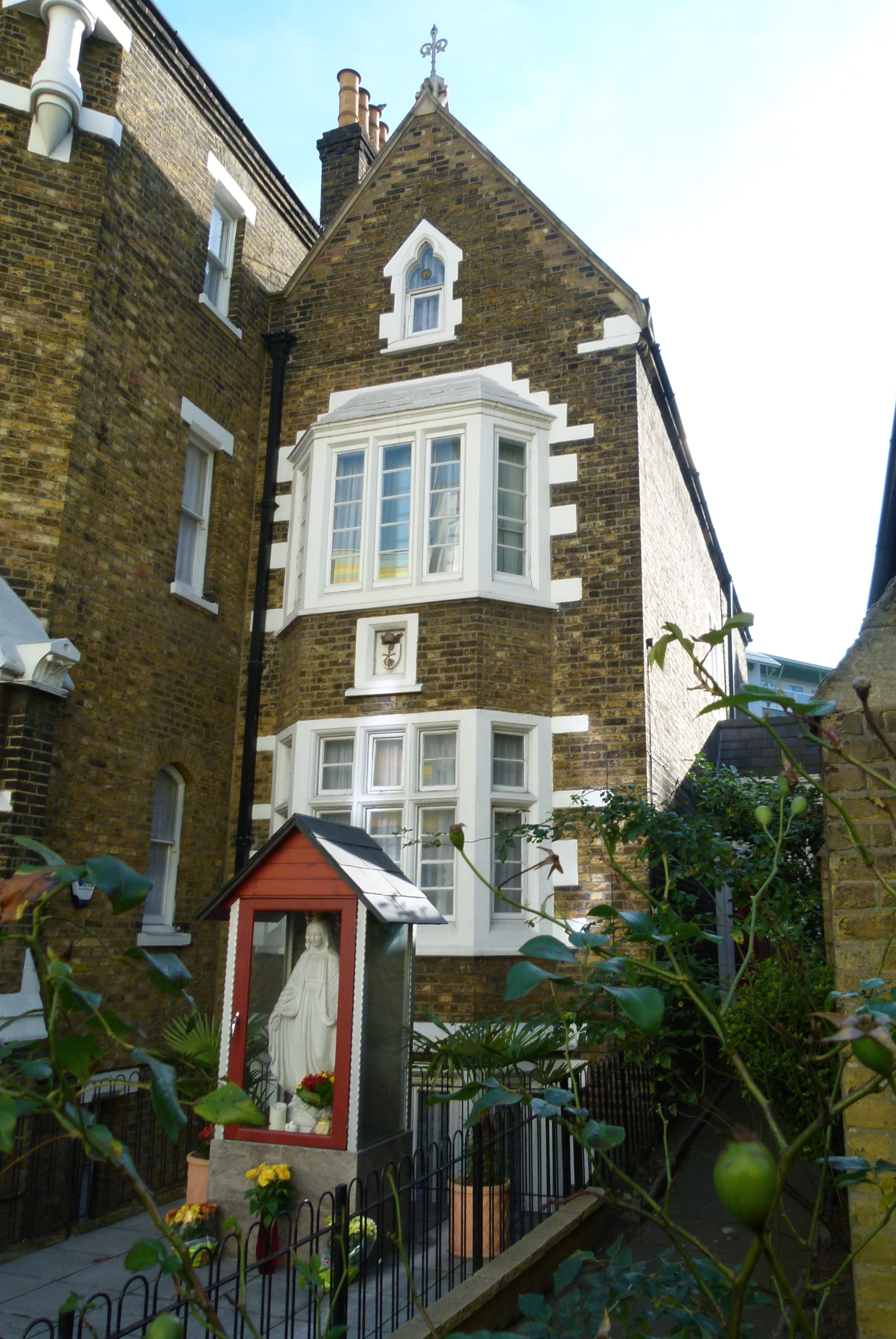
Presbytery designed by Pugin

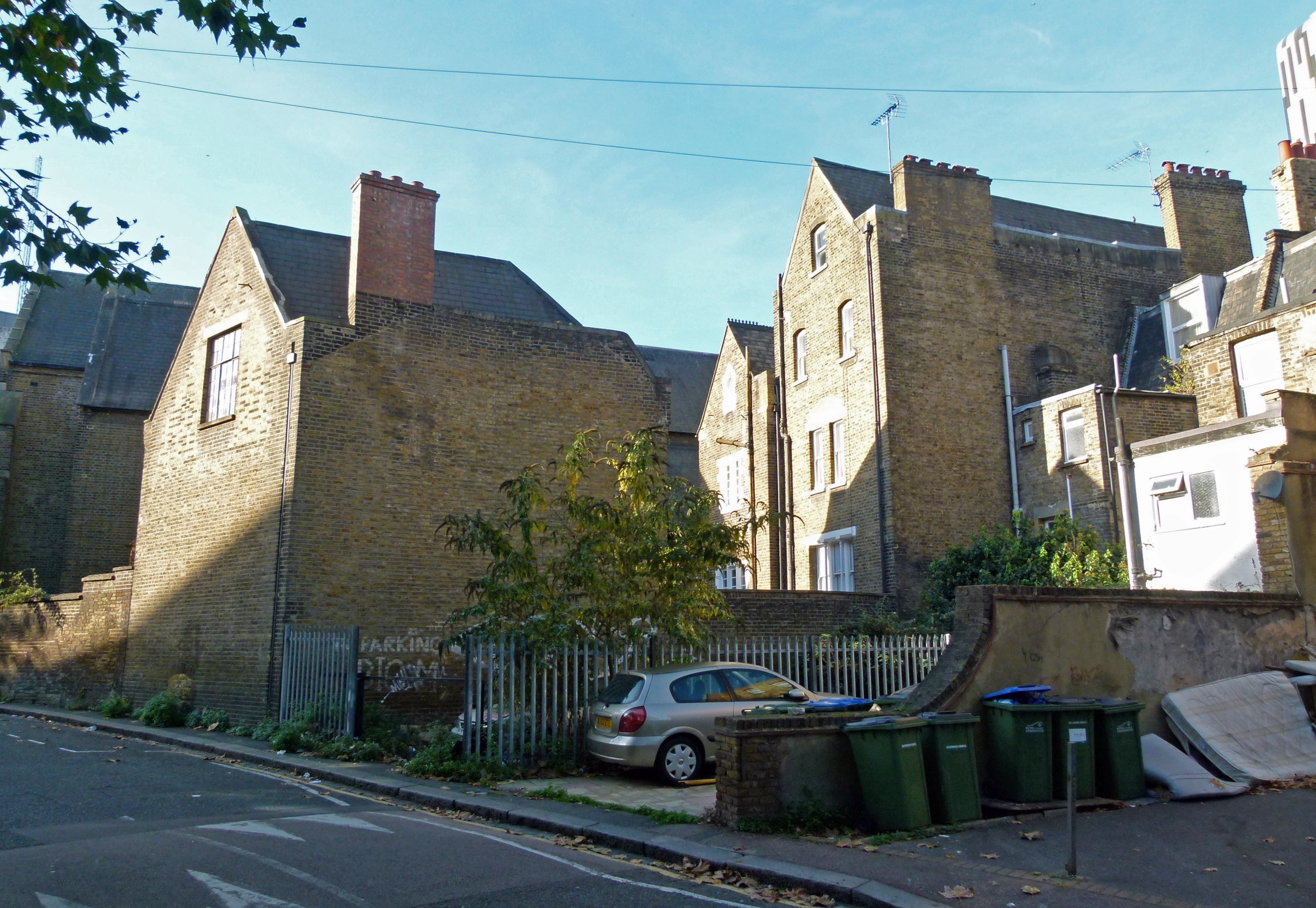
New presbytery and 'music room' from Brookhill Road

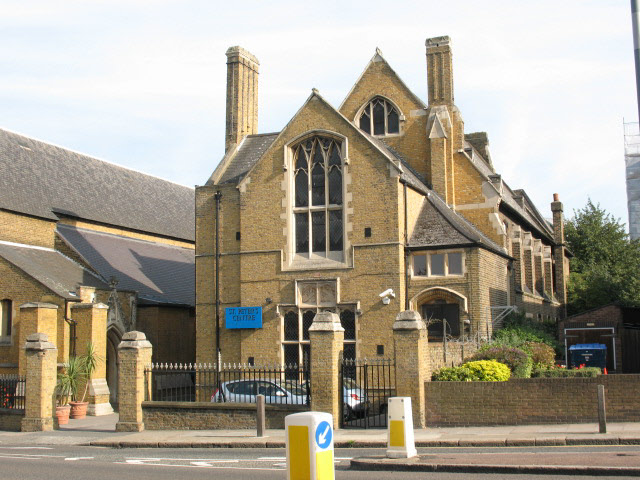
Former school from Woolwich New Road

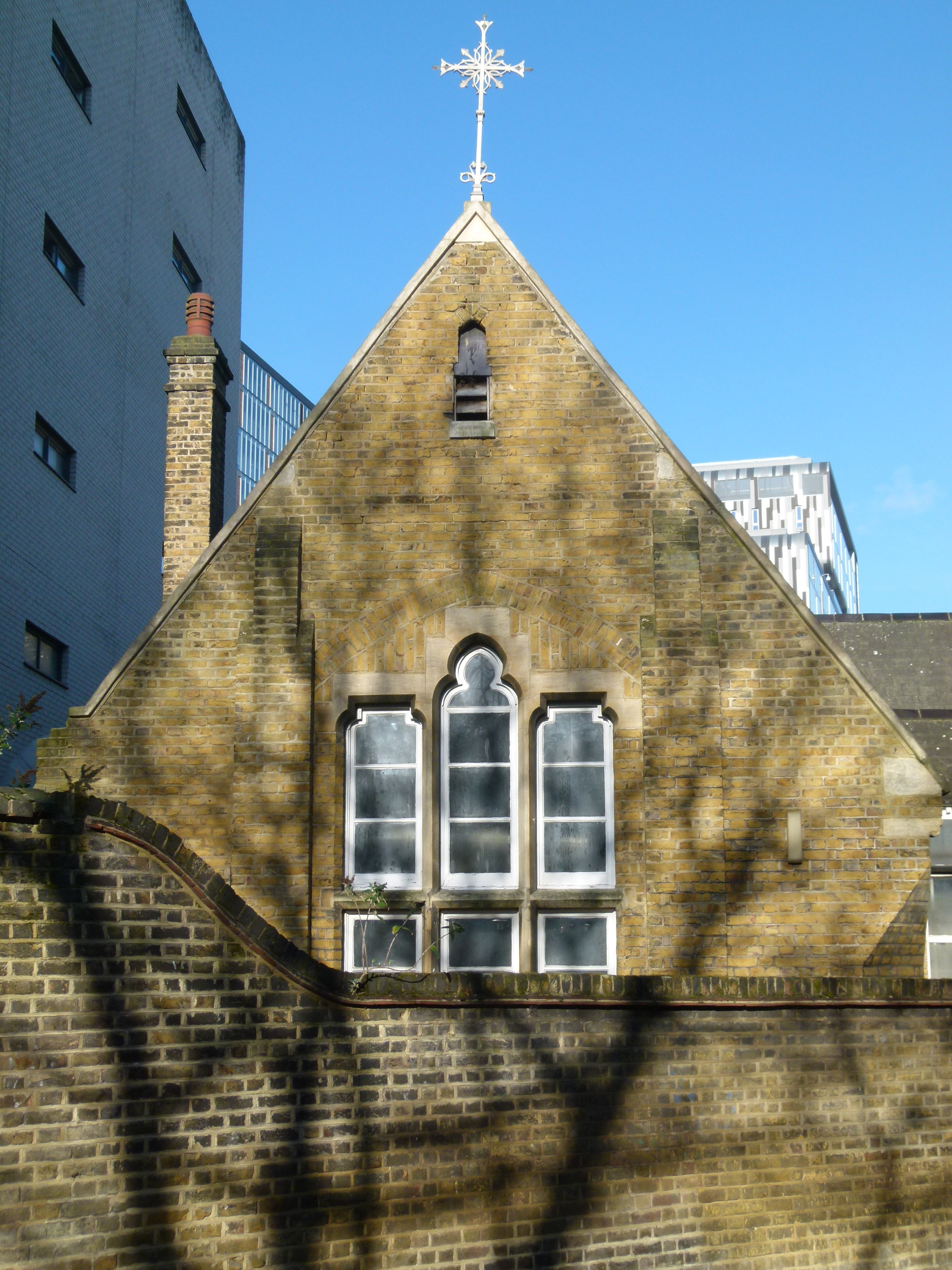
Former infant school from Brookhill Road

== Notes and references ==
- Fincham, K., Augustus Pugin and the building of St Peter's, Woolwich. A talk in the church, 13 June 2013 (text online available)
- Saint, A., Guillery, P. (ed.), Woolwich – Survey of London, Volume 48, Yale Books, London, 2012. ISBN 978 0 300 18722 9 (online text chapter 9; please note page numbers online do not correspond with the book)
