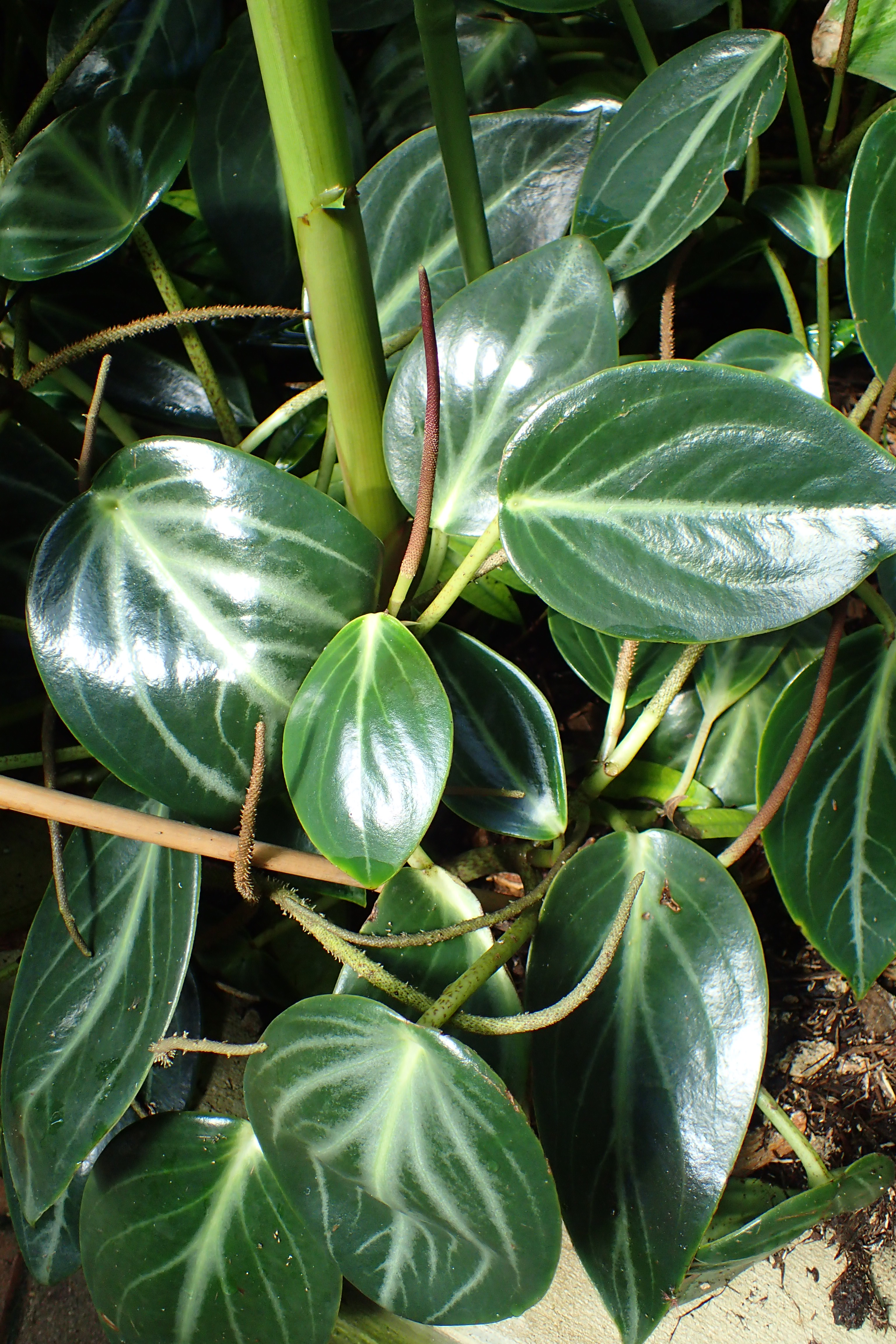

Scientific classification
- Kingdom: Plantae
- Clade: Tracheophytes
- Clade: Angiosperms
- Clade: Magnoliids
- Order: Piperales
- Family: Piperaceae
- Genus: Peperomia
- Species: P. maculosa

Binomial name
- Peperomia maculosa (L.) Hook.

Synonyms
- List: Artanthe variegata (Ruiz & Pav.) Miq.; Lepianthes maculosum (L.) Raf.; Peperomia leridana Trel.; Peperomia monsterifolia Griseb.; Peperomia parmata Trel.; Peperomia scheryi Trel.; Peperomia septuplinervia C.DC.; Peperomia suavis Trel.; Peperomia suavis var. hondurensis Trel.; Peperomia tenebraegaudens Trel.; Peperomia variegata Ruiz & Pav.; Piper maculosum L.; Piper variegatum (Ruiz & Pav.) Pers.; Schilleria variegata (Ruiz & Pav.) Kunth

= Peperomia maculosa =

Species of plant

Peperomia maculosa, commonly known as spotted-stalked peperomia and spotted peperomia, is a species of plant in the genus Peperomia. Its native range is from Mexico to northern South America.

== Description ==
Visually conspicuous species with glossy large white-veined dark-green leaves that are attached to spotted petioles. The large leaves can be 15 cm or more in length and their underside is of a pale green colour. The stems are one to two cm thick, swelling at where petioles branch out. The petioles can be 15 to 20 cm long, covered in fine hair, light green spotted with purplish-brown, and grooved on the top side. The flower spikes are solitary, 20 to 30 cm long, and purplish in color. The spikes emit a faint musky smell usually at dusk.

== Taxonomy ==
The accepted description of the plant is that of William Jackson Hooker from 1875 who examined specimens from the collections of Glasgow Botanic Gardens and the former Liverpool Botanic Gardens, today the place of Wavertree Botanic Garden and Park.
