= Thomas Stevens (cyclist) =

English cyclist

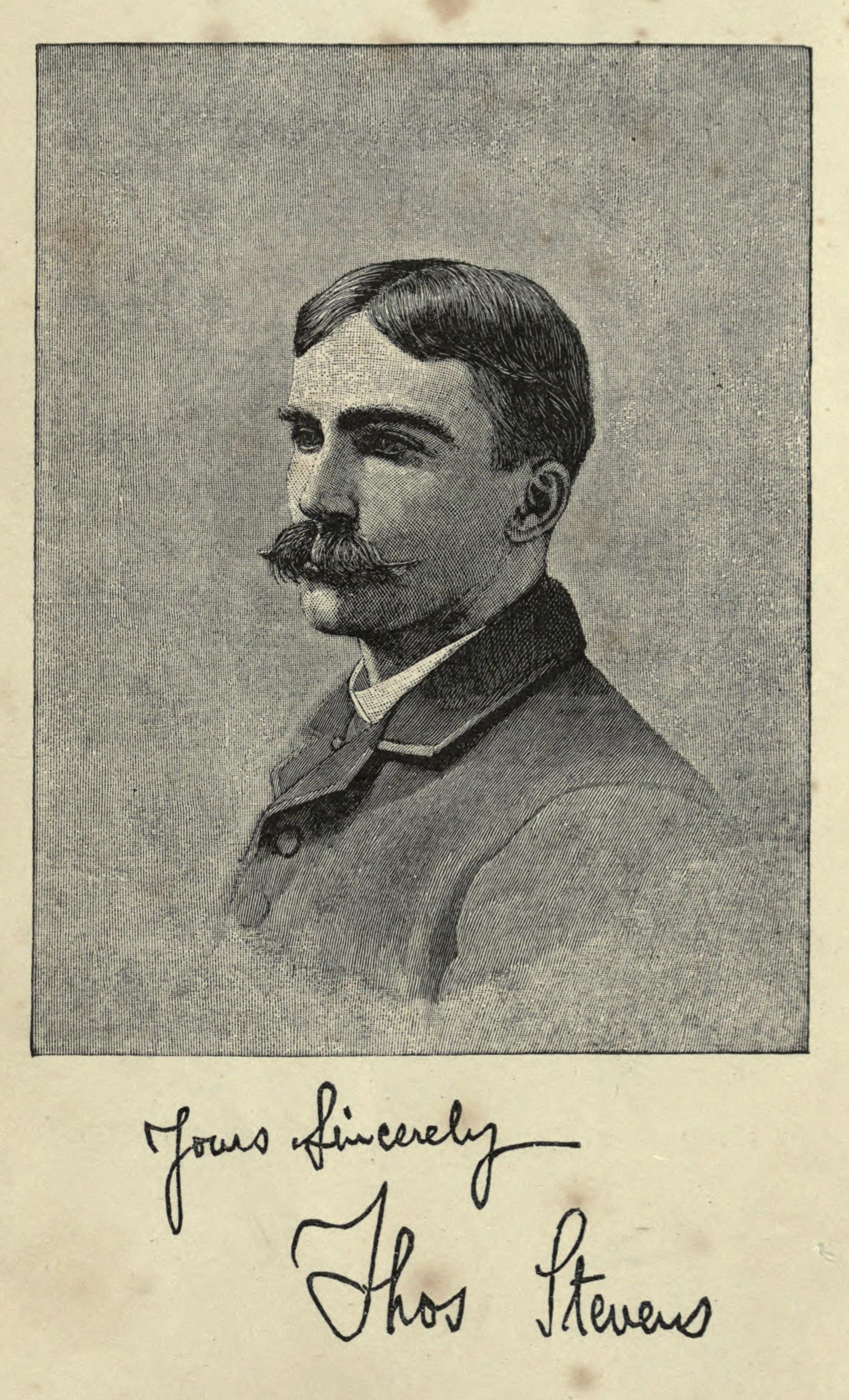
- Born: Thomas Stevens; 24 December 1854; Berkhamsted, Hertfordshire, England
- Died: 24 January 1935 (aged 80); London, England

Thomas Stevens (24 December 1854 – 24 January 1935) was an English-American citizen. He is regarded as the first person to circle the globe by bicycle. He rode a large-wheeled Ordinary, also known as a penny-farthing, from April 1884 to December 1886. He later searched for Henry Morton Stanley in Africa, investigated the claims of Indian ascetics and became manager of the Garrick Theatre in London.

== Origins ==
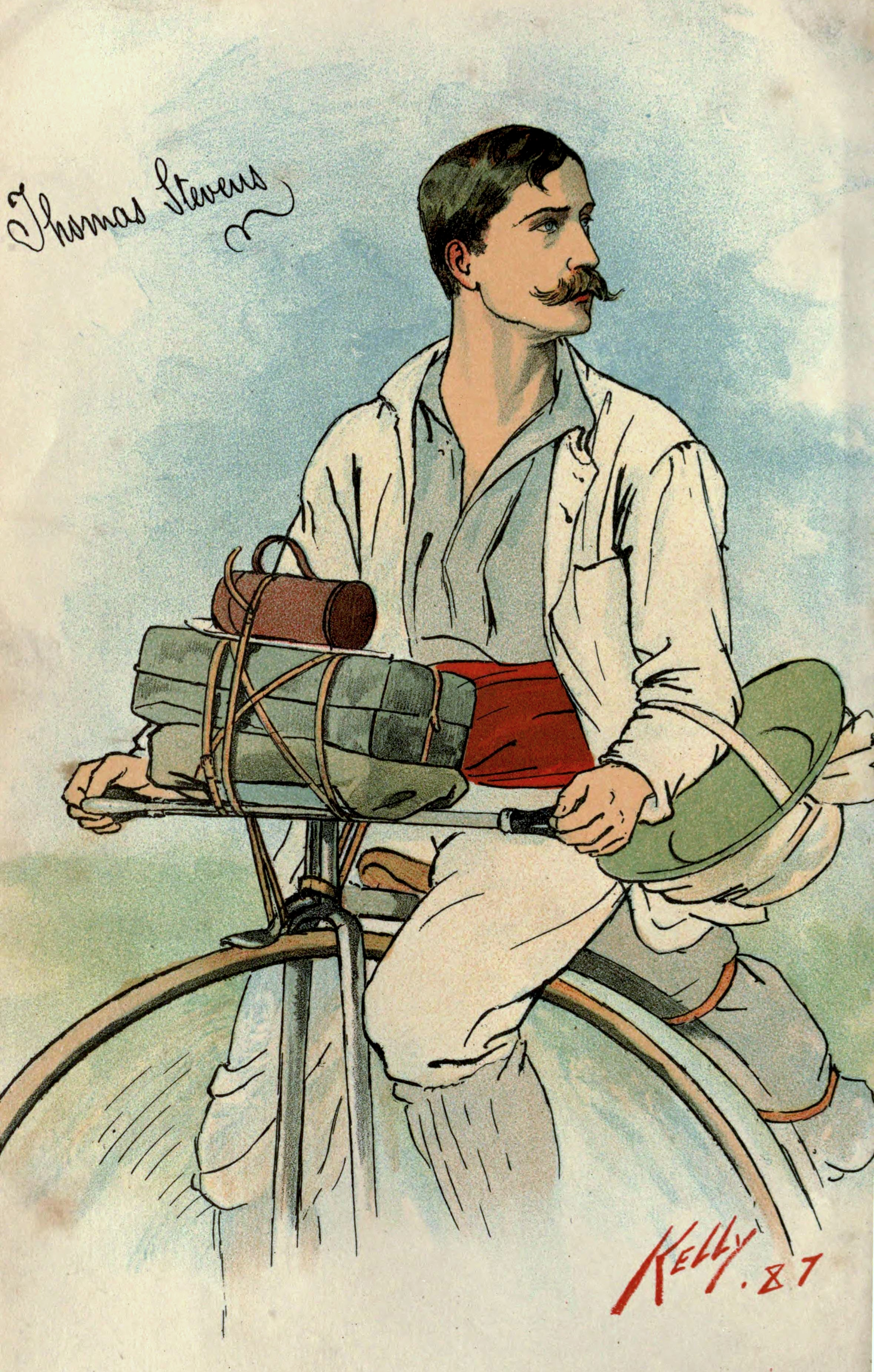
Drawing of Stevens riding his penny-farthing bicycle

Stevens, known as Tom, was born in Castle Street, Berkhamsted, Hertfordshire. the son of William and Ann Stevens. His father was a labourer. Thomas had an older sister, Bridget, and younger, Jane. He went to Bourne Charity School, then became an apprentice grocer. His father emigrated to Missouri, United States in 1868 but returned when his wife became ill and before the rest of the family could also go to America. Tom went with a half-brother but without his parents and sisters in 1871 and the rest of the family followed two years later. They moved to Denver and then to San Francisco, where he learned to ride a bicycle.

Adventure Cyclist described him as "a man of medium height, wearing an oversized blue flannel shirt over blue overalls, which were tucked into a pair of leggings at the knee [and] tanned 'as a nut'. A mustache protruded from his face." It said: "A two-year stint in a Wyoming railroad mill ended when he was run out of town after it became known that he was importing British labourers in exchange for part of their salaries. He later found work in a Colorado mine where he came up with the idea of riding a bicycle across the country."

== Around the World ==
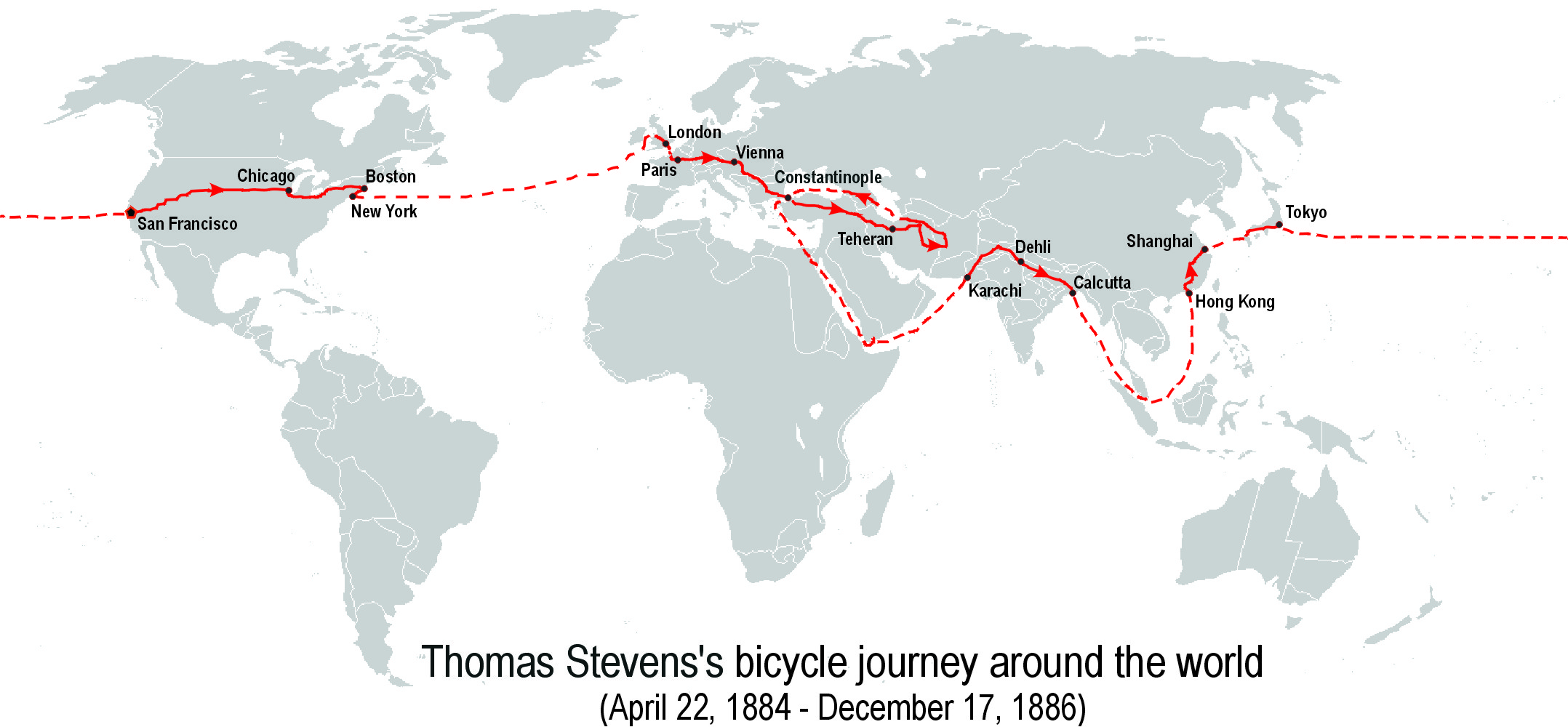
Steven's route around the world

=== America ===
In 1884 he acquired a black-enameled Columbia 50-inch 'Standard' penny-farthing with nickel-plated wheels, built by the Pope Manufacturing Company of Chicago. He packed his handlebar bag with socks, a spare shirt, a raincoat that doubled as tent and bedroll, and a pocket revolver (described as a "bull-dog revolver", probably a British Bull Dog revolver) and left San Francisco at 8 o'clock on 22 April 1884. From Sacramento, Stevens travelled through the Sierra Nevada Mountains to Nevada, Utah, and Wyoming. En route, he was greeted by members of local bicycle clubs, most prominently the president of a chapter of the League of American Wheelmen in Laramie, Wyoming. He had never seen North America east of the Mississippi before. He reached Boston, after 3,700 miles on wagon trails, railways, canal towpaths and public roads, to complete the first transcontinental bicycle ride on 4 August 1884.

Harper's reported: "More than one-third of the route followed by Mr. Stevens had to be walked. Eighty-three and a half days of actual travel and twenty days' stoppage for wet weather, etc., made one hundred and three and a half days occupied in reaching Boston, the distance by wagon-road being about 3,700 miles. He followed the old California trail most of the way across the plains and mountains, astonishing the Indians, and meeting with many strange adventures."

Thomas Wentworth Higginson, who heard Stevens speak at the Massachusetts Bicycle Club, said: "He seemed like Jules Verne, telling his own wonderful performances, or like a contemporary Sinbad the Sailor. We found that modern mechanical invention, instead of disenchanting the universe, had really afforded the means of exploring its marvels the more surely. Instead of going round the world with a rifle, for the purpose of killing something – or with a bundle of tracts, in order to convert somebody – this bold youth simply went round the globe to see the people who were on it; and since he always had something to show them as interesting as anything that they could show him, he made his way among all nations."

=== Europe ===
Stevens passed the winter in New York and contributed sketches of his transcontinental trip to Outing, a cycling magazine. It made him a special correspondent and sent him on the steamer City of Chicago to Liverpool. He landed there 10 days later, on 9 April 1885. He left his bicycle in the underground storerooms of the London and North Western Railway and went by train to London to arrange his crossing of Europe and to investigate conditions in Asia. He was helped by an interpreter at the Chinese embassy who discouraged him from riding across Upper Burma and China.

He returned to Liverpool on 30 April 1885 and on 4 May made a formal start to his ride at Edge Hill church, where several hundred people watched him leave. He wrote:

A small sea of hats is enthusiastically waved aloft; a ripple of applause escaped from 500 English throats as I mount my glistening bicycle; and with the assistance of a few policemen, 25 Liverpool cyclers who have assembled to accompany me out extricate themselves from the crowd, mount, and fall into line two abreast; and merrily we wheel down Edge-lane and out of Liverpool.

It began raining within minutes.

He rode, wearing a white military helmet through England, passing through Berkhamsted, where he had been born. He recorded that roads in England were better than in America. He took the ferry from Newhaven to Dieppe to cross to France and continued through Germany; Austria; Hungary, where he picked up a temporary cycling companion with whom he shared no language; Slavonia; Serbia; Bulgaria; Rumelia; and Turkey.

In Constantinople he rested among people who had heard of America, refitted with spare spokes, tires and other parts and a better pistol (a .38-calibre Smith & Wesson), waited for reports of banditry to subside, and then pedalled off through Anatolia, Armenia, Kurdistan, Iraq and Iran, where he waited out the winter in Teheran as a guest of the Shah, Naser al-Din.

=== Afghanistan ===
Having been refused permission to travel through Siberia, he set off on 10 March 1886 through Afghanistan although its borders were closed to foreigners and its guards had a fierce reputation. Upon entering the country, Stevens was arrested. As guards took him to his place of detainment, he entertained them with a demonstration of his bicycle, pedalling far ahead of them until an officer caught up on horse and had him wait for the on-foot soldiers to catch up.

He was kept in a villa where he was fed well and given new boots, soap and biscuits imported from England. A fine horse was kept in the garden aside his quarters that he might enjoy looking at.

Finally ejected from Afghanistan, Stevens was accompanied back to Persia. Again, he was allowed to speed ahead of his captors so long as he stopped and waited for them occasionally. Eventually, however, the soldiers grew nervous and disassembled his bicycle, strapping the pieces to a packhorse, which later laid upon the larger wheel, breaking many spokes, the most severe damage the penny-farthing experienced upon the trip. Afghan gunsmiths drilled new holes and stretched new spokes. Some spokes remained subpar, though sufficient to complete the thousands of miles yet ahead.

=== Asia ===
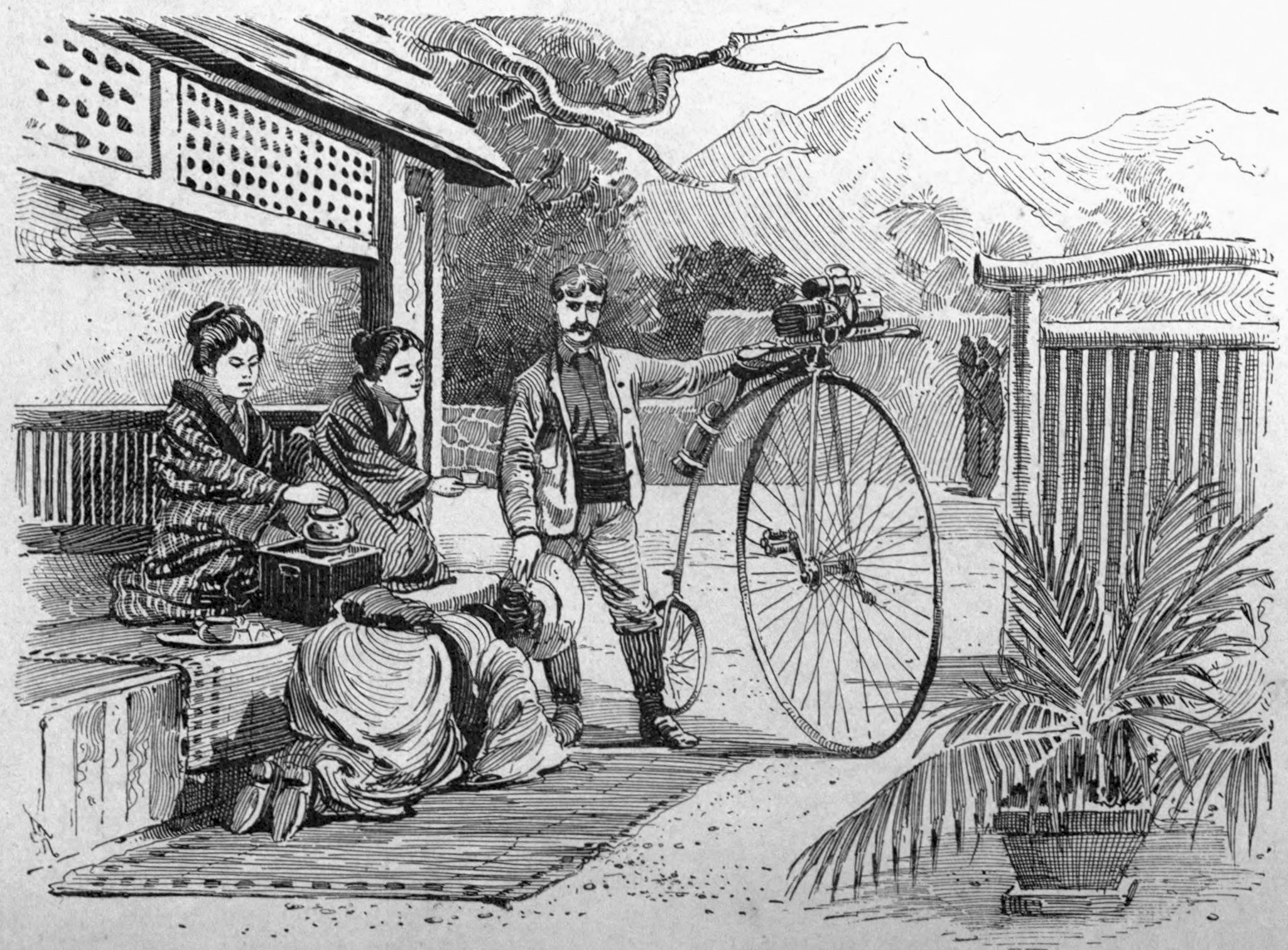
A drawn depiction of Thomas Stevens in Japan, from the book about his travels

He took a Russian steamer across the Caspian to Baku, a rail to Batoum, and a steamer to Constantinople and India. In the Red Sea his knowledge of mules was useful to the British Army. He cycled across India, noting that the weather was always hot and the Grand Trunk Road was excellent wheeling and free from bandits. Much of his description of life in India, however, suffers from being based on the opinions of experts rather than his own observations. Another steamer brought him from Calcutta to Hong Kong and southern China. He pedalled to eastern China, encountering great difficulty in asking directions in a language he couldn't pronounce. A Chinese official gave him refuge from rioters who were angry over a war with the French. From the coast he took a steamer to Japan, where he delighted in the calm of that country. The bicycle part of his journey around the world ends 17 December 1886, at Yokohama. His itinerary accounts "DISTANCE ACTUALLY WHEELED, ABOUT 13,500 MILES". Stevens returned by steamer to San Francisco, in January 1887.

Stevens' travels through Japan were reported in the Jijishinpou newspaper. Along the way, Stevens sent a series of letters to Harper's Magazine detailing his experiences and later collected those experiences into a two-volume book of 1,000 pages, Around the World on a Bicycle, which is available in a single-volume paperback and publicly available at digital library projects. The price of an original has been estimated at between US$300 and US$400.

The Pope Company preserved Stevens's bicycle until World War II, when it was donated to a scrap drive to support the war effort.

== The search for Stanley ==
The New York World asked Thomas in 1888 to join its search in East Africa for the explorer Henry Morton Stanley. Stanley had travelled up the Congo but a year and a half had passed without news. Stevens called it "a grand opportunity; the one chance, mayhap, of a lifetime, to spring into fame on the stage of African exploit. How would I Found Stanley look in the libraries with I Found Livingstone?"

Stevens left New York by ship on 5 January 1889. His instructions, he said, were:

Go to Zanzibar. Investigate the state of affairs there. Let us know the truth about the troubles between the Germans and the Arabs. See what is to be seen of the slave trade. Find out all you can about Stanley and Emin Pasha, and, if necessary or advisable, organise an expedition and penetrate the interior for reliable news of the Emin Pasha Relief expedition. Spare no expense in carrying out the main object of the enterprise, but at the same time don't throw money away recklessly.

Stevens led a six-month expedition, writing for the newspaper of climbing Mount Kilimanjaro and hunting big game. He found Stanley's camp in a race with the rival New York Herald and wrote his memoir, Scouting for Stanley in East Africa. It concluded:

By the end of February 1890, I was again in New York. I had been gone fourteen months. I had not 'found Stanley,' as Stanley had found Livingstone in 1871; the circumstances were altogether different. I had, however, gratified a pardonable journalistic ambition in being the first correspondent to reach him and to give him news of the world, after his long period of African darkness. That I had done this under most trying conditions, Mr. Stanley fully appreciated; and warmly reciprocated by showing me every courtesy in his power, on the march to the coast, in Zanzibar, and in Egypt.

Stevens then reported from Russia, sailed the rivers of Europe, and investigated miracles claimed by Indian ascetics. His conclusions that "the stories of travelers, from Marco Polo to the latest witness of Indian miracles ... are quite true" were greeted with scepticism and his career faltered. A planned tour of London with his Indian photographs fell through.

== Return to England ==
Stevens returned to England around 1895 and married Frances Barnes (née Nation), widowed mother of the actresses Irene and Violet Vanbrugh. He became manager of the Garrick Theatre in London. He died in London of cancer of the bladder and was buried at St Marylebone Cemetery in East Finchley, London.

His publications also include:

- Around The World on a Bicycle, London: Sampson Low, Marston, Searle and Rivington, 1887
- Wild Pea-Fowls in British India, St Nicholas Magazine September 1888
- Some Asiatic Dogs, St Nicholas Magazine February 1890
- African River and Lake Systems, Scribner's Magazine, September 1890
- Through Russia on a Mustang, Cassell Publishing Company, New York, 1891
- Bicycling, Lippincott's Magazine (V49) May, 1892
- Across Europe with a Petroleum Launch (From the German Ocean to the Black Sea), Outing Magazine April 1892-September 1892
- Babes of the Empire, London: William Heinemann, 1902

== See also ==
- Frank Lenz (cyclist)
- Kazimierz Nowak
