= Royal Jubilee Exhibition, Liverpool =

Exhibition held in Liverpool in 1887

Coordinates: 53.407°N 2.942°W

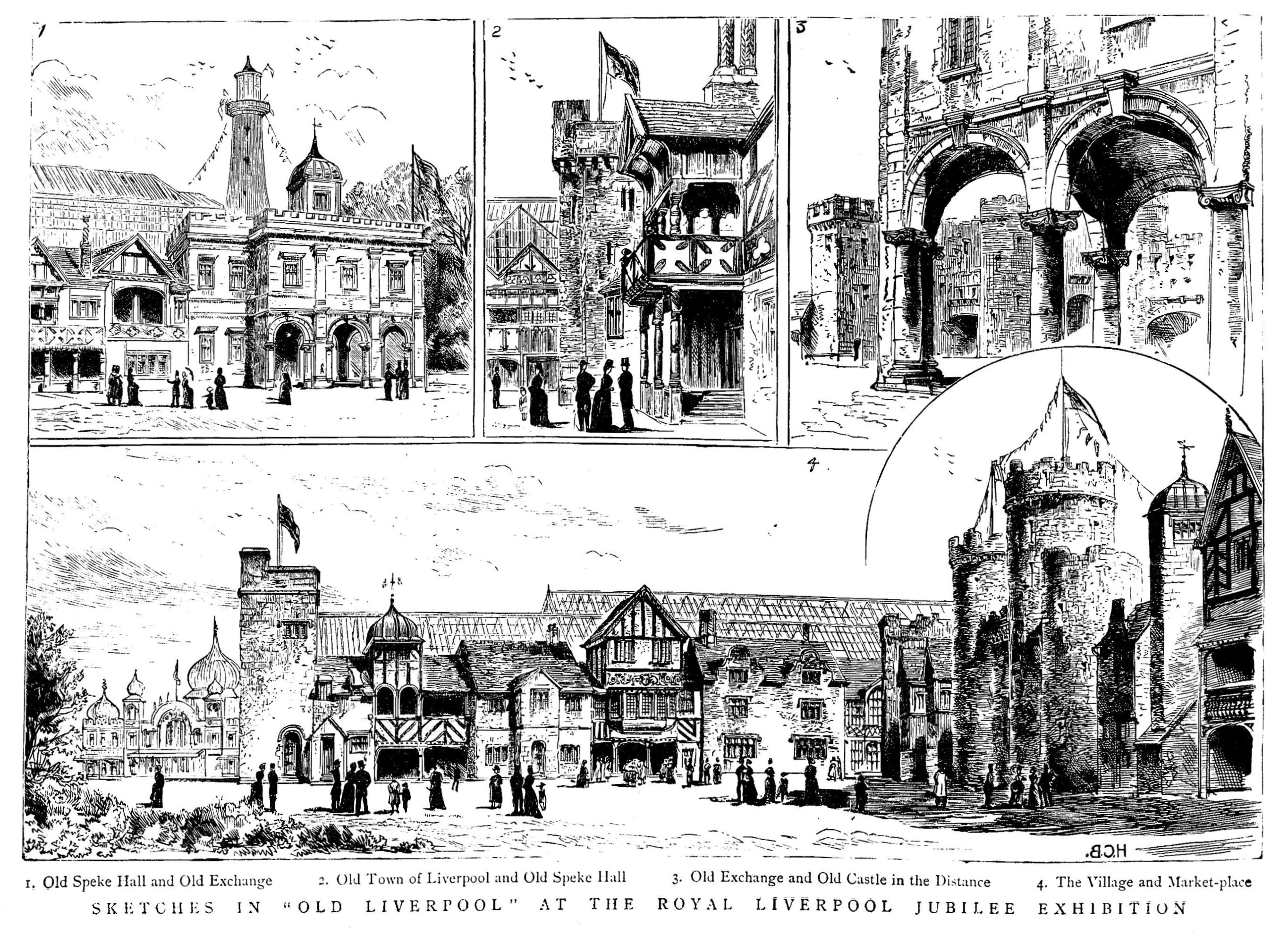
Sketches in "Old Liverpool" at the Royal Liverpool Jubilee Exhibition. The Graphic, 1887.

The Royal Jubilee Exhibition, Liverpool, was held in Liverpool in 1887 on the occasion of the Golden Jubilee of Queen Victoria, on the site of the previous year's International Exhibition, now Wavertree Botanic Garden and Park. It had a theme of the Arts of Peace and War.

== Opening ==
The exhibition was opened on 16 May 1887 by Princess Louise, daughter of Queen Victoria, and her husband the Marquess of Lorne with a musical performance from local choirs, the Exhibition Orchestra, and the band of the Coldstream Guards. Dramatic performances took place at the Royal Victoria Theatre.

== Theme ==
The theme of the exhibition was the Arts of Peace and War with trophies of war and mementoes of famous explorations lent by Queen Victoria. It included life-size depictions of "Old Liverpool" that were reproduced for The Graphic.

== See also ==
- International Exhibition of Navigation, Commerce and Industry
