= Liverpool Shopping Park =

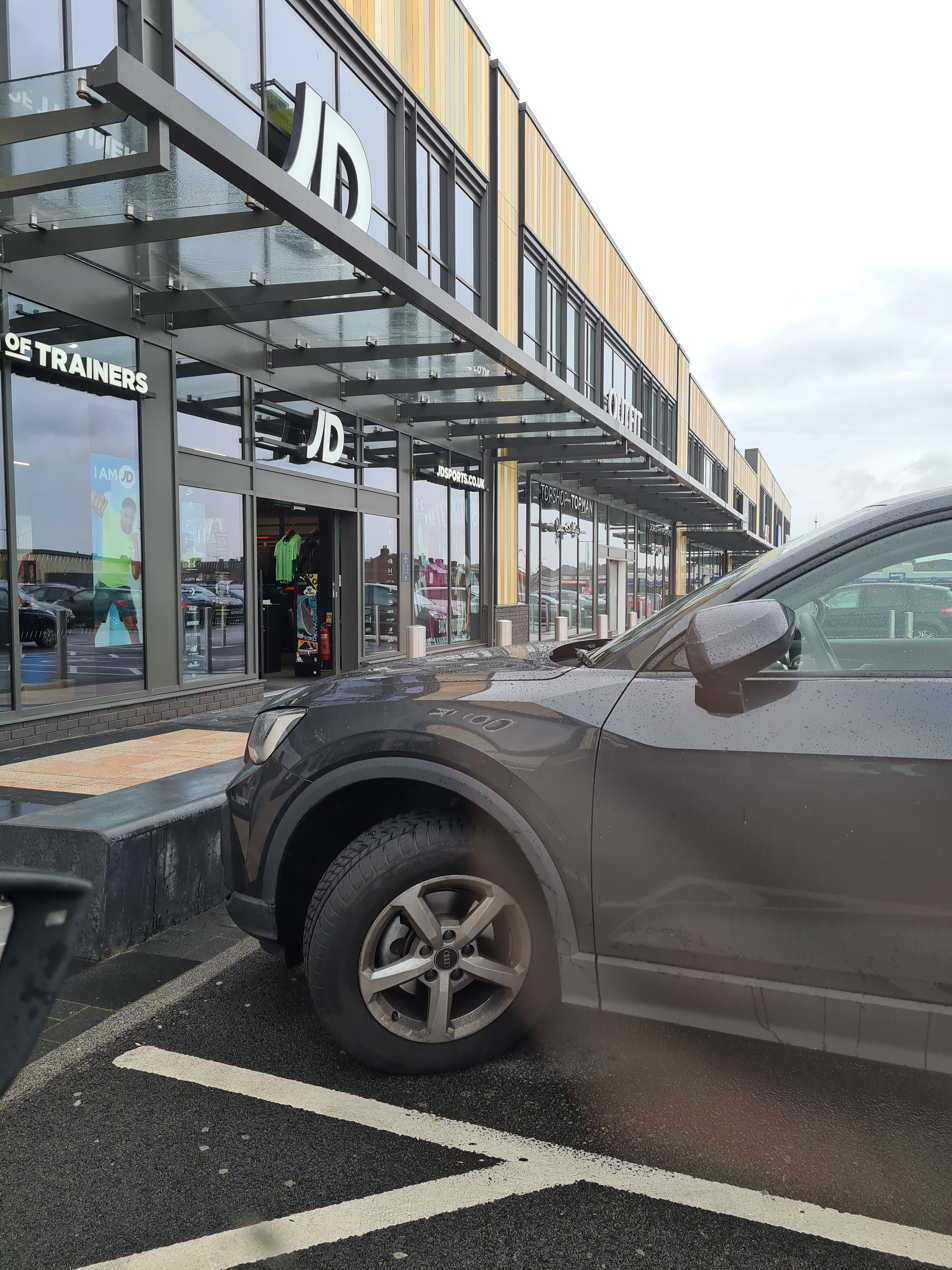
- Liverpool Shopping Park
- Location: Liverpool, England
- Coordinates: 53.4096°N 2.9257°W
- Address: Edge Lane
- Owner: Albert Gubay
- Floor area: 727,000 sq ft (67,500 m^{2})
- Floors: 1
- Website: liverpoolshoppingpark.co.uk

Liverpool Shopping Park is an out of town retail park located in Edge Lane, Liverpool, England. It is the biggest retail park in Liverpool, overtaking the New Mersey Retail Park in Speke (473,000 sq ft (43,900 m^{2})), and has the world's largest Liver bird at 30 ft (9.1 m) and made of Meccano.

== History ==
Opened in 1991 as Edge Lane Retail Park, it had an MGM cinema, renamed Virgin in 1995, then UGC in 1999 then Cineworld in 2005. Comet, Land of Leather, JJB Sports, Carpet Right and Deep Pan Pizza and Fatty Arbuckle's also operated. The site began redevelopment in the mid-2010s and Phase 1 of the new shopping park opened in November 2017.

== Stores ==
Below are just a few of the many stores - as of March 2018 the shopping centre contains:
Costa Coffee, Next, Boots A planned 41 retail units are available.

=== Phase 1 ===
At October 2017. M&S FoodHall, Boots, H&M, Superdrug, Smyths Toys, TK Maxx, JD Sports, Footasylum, River Island, Regatta and fashion retailer Outfit (store) whose brands include Topshop, Topman, Miss Selfridge and Dorothy Perkins in selected stores. Frankie & Benny's was the sole survivor of the previous tenants (except for McDonald's and Hollywood Bowl) and was incorporated in the phase in a new building.

Eight more retailers Regatta, Superdrug, The Works and Footasylum and Wilko, Next, Clarks and Greggs followed in early 2018.

All of the new retailers took space in the Western Quarter, the distinctive 'horseshoe' of 17 retail units that front onto Edge Lane. Greggs took a unit close to the park's main entrance, near to Chiquito and Subway.

At November 2022. Nike opened at Edge Lane by the former Outfit (store) and on June 2023. Puregym opened at Edge Lane and on July 2024. Schuh opened at Edge Lane as well.

=== Phase 2 (2025) ===
The final original part of the then-named Edge Lane Retail Park, which included a Hollywood Bowl and a McDonald's restaurant was closed and demolished in 2024 for redevelopment. The McDonald's restaurant was not affected by the redevelopment.

The redevelopment of the area would include a redeveloped Hollywood Bowl, three restaurants operated by Nando's, Wagamama and Wingstop, a Tesla showroom and two drive thru's operated by Five Guys and Costa Coffee.

At September 2026. Slim Chickens opened at Edge Lane by the former Chiqutio and Adam Cummings opened a Tribal Society store at Edge Lane by the former Clarks as well.

=== Phase 3 (2027) ===
The final phase of the retail park's construction would be next to the fourth phase (and former space of the demolished B&Q store) and would add an upsized Marks & Spencer food hall, moving from the first phase of the retail park, the development would also have 2 extra retail units. It is expected to be completed in 2027.

== Transport ==
The shopping park is located in close proximity to the local railway station and bus interchange.

== See also ==
- Liverpool One
- New Mersey Retail Park
