= Edge Lane =

Road in Liverpool, UK

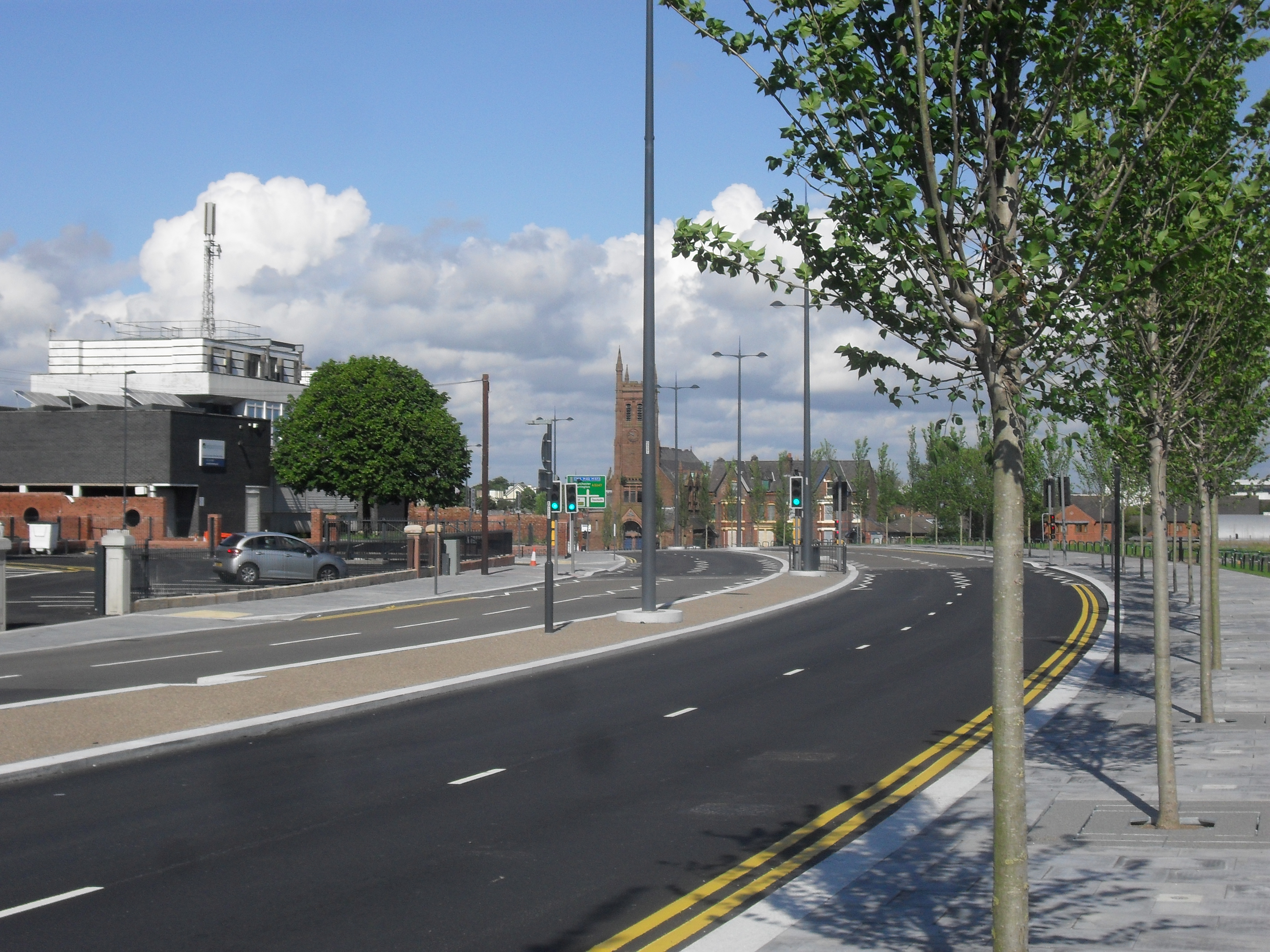
- Edge Lane after widening, June 2012

- Location within Liverpool
- Part of: A5047 road
- Length: 1.7 mi (2.7 km)
- Location: Fairfield, Liverpool
- Postal code: L7
- Coordinates: 53.40730°N 2.95826°W

Other
- Known for: Edge Lane Retail Park; The Grange; Wavertree Botanic Park and Gardens

Edge Lane is a main road running from the periphery of Liverpool city centre at Hall Lane towards the M62 motorway. Edge Lane technically comprises two roads, that of 'Edge Lane' and that of 'Edge Lane Drive' and passes through the districts of Old Swan, Kensington, Wavertree and Edge Hill. It forms part of the A5047.

The road appears in historical records from the 16th century and remained rural until houses and streets were constructed along the route during the 19th century. Following a project to widen the road in 2012, numerous properties were demolished to facilitate the route becoming dual carriageway, which in 2008 was described as being one of Merseyside's "biggest traffic bottlenecks" into the city centre as a result of rush hour congestion.

There is a large leisure park on the route containing various amenities such as bowling alley and fast food outlets.

== History ==
The road is so-named given it runs along the edge of West Derby, parallel with the division between Wavertree, whilst Edge Hill takes its name directly from the road. The first records of Edge Lane are from 1539, when it was identified as a packhorse track to Prescot. Heavy traffic of coal resulted in the Prescot section of the road falling into a state of disrepair, as noted by the first Act of Parliament dealing with the highway in 1745. The oldest surviving house is 115 Edge Lane, also known as Adelaide House, a Grade II listed building.

Many merchant princes of Liverpool were born or resided at Edge Lane or the neighbouring Edge Hill. Gores directory of Liverpool from 1825 and 1827 show houses being occupied by a mixture of merchants and gentry rather than workers of a single predominant trade. The 1881 census further suggests a diverse mixture of residents, including merchants, teachers and journalists, a trend that continued into the side streets. By 1875, many of the houses that adorned Edge Lane had already been constructed and by this time it was considered an attractive suburb, largely due to it being rural, with clean air and a higher quality of housing. Houses built along Edge Lane typically were constructed as three storeys, compared to two storey housing on the streets parallel and off the road.

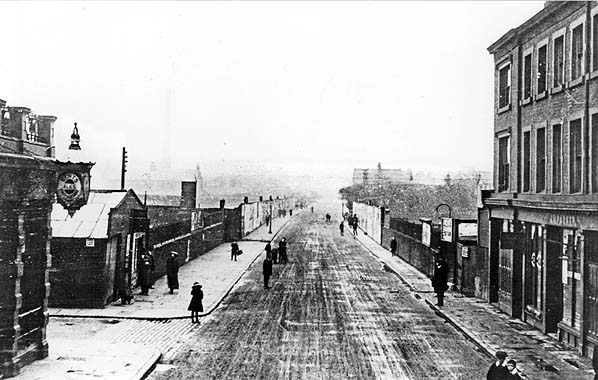
A view of Edge Lane, Liverpool looking East in 1912

In the early 20th century, an eastern section named Edge Lane Drive appeared on maps, although was not a direct extension to Edge Lane as streets of houses split the two into distinctly separate roads. A map from 1895 shows the road was built over fields immediately south of Oak Hill Park. By 1925, the street that had separated the two roads, Springfield Street, ceased to exist on maps and the south half of the street's housing had been demolished to accommodate a direct link between the two roads. A map from 1938 shows Edge Lane Drive extending further east into Broad Green, although this section would later become known as Thomas Drive.

During construction of the M62 motorway, original plans intended for the motorway to start from Liverpool's City Centre and run along the path of Edge Lane, however economic decline during the 1970s and the cost to demolish significant number of properties meant this plan never came to fruition. The current start of the motorway is known as junction 5, as Edge Lane was planned to form part of the first section and junctions.

=== Edge Lane Project ===
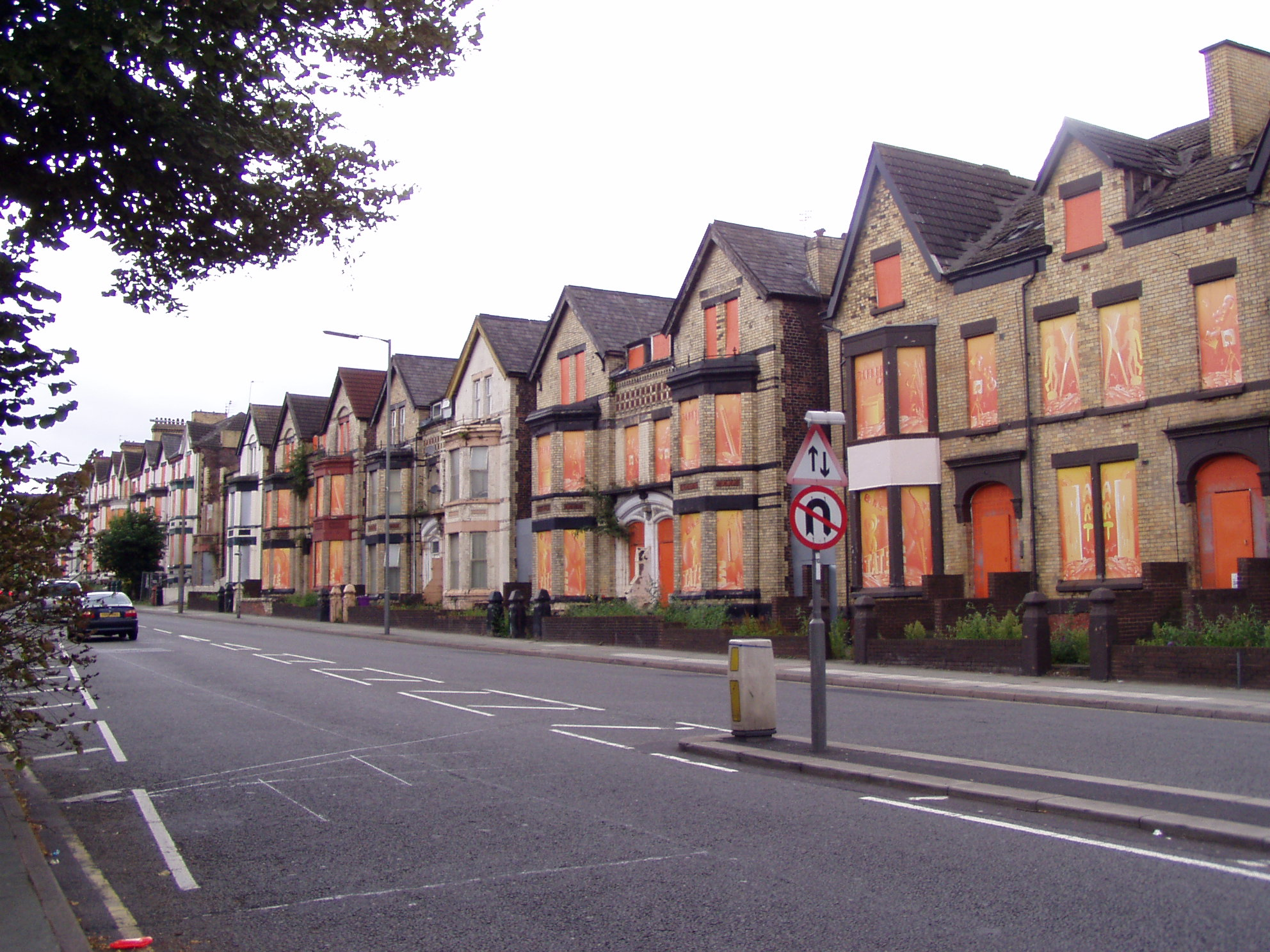
Boarded up properties for demolition, August 2009

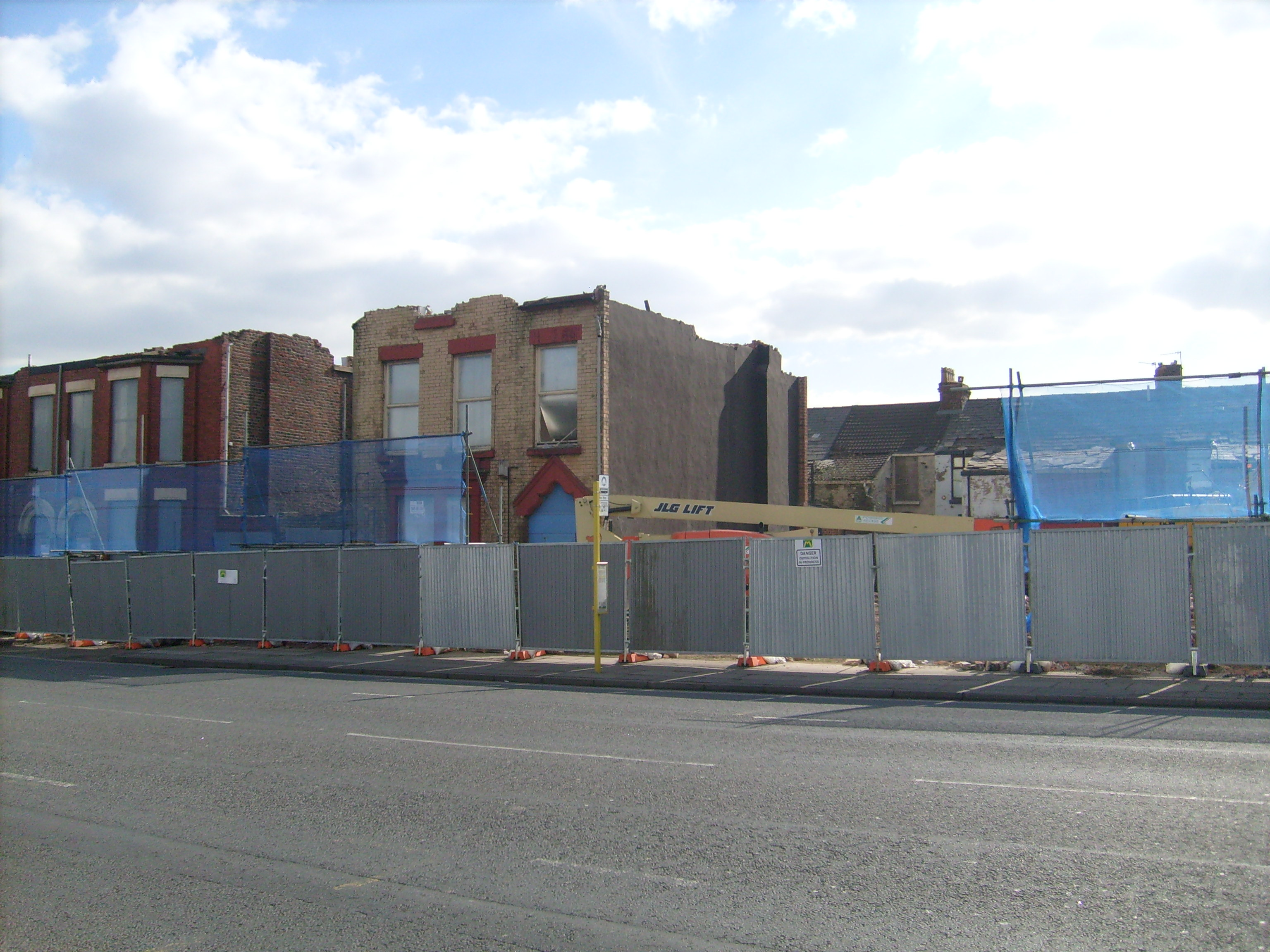
Properties being demolished in March 2010

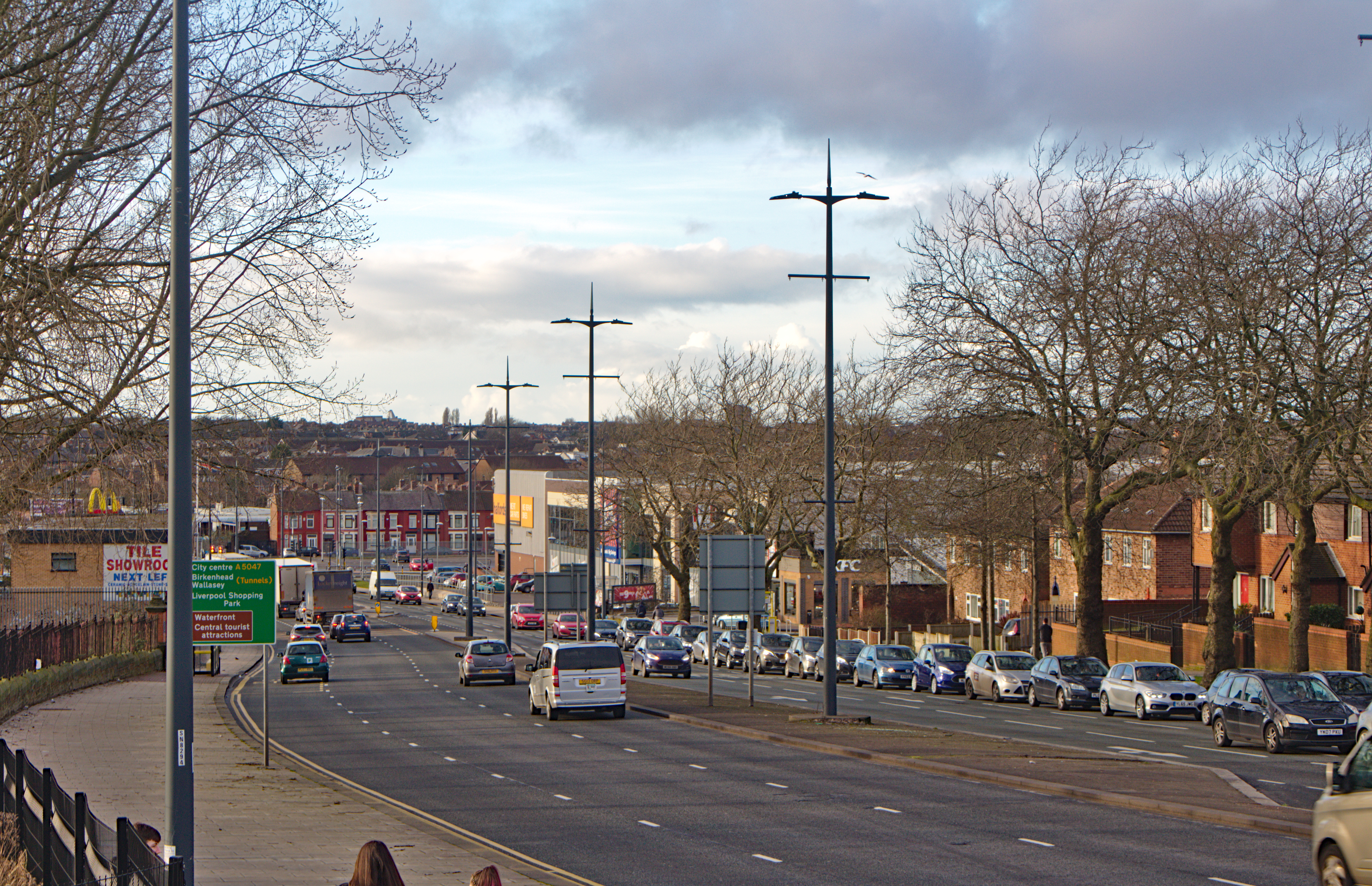
Edge Lane, looking west from Rathbone Road

Edge Lane underwent significant road widening, known as the Edge Lane project, during 2010-2012 estimated to cost £20.4m in 2010. For the widening to be viable, 371 houses were compulsorily purchased by Liverpool City Council to be demolished in order for the project to take place, to be replaced with 188 new homes. In 2004, there were 131 empty houses in the Edge Lane West area, of which only four properties were owned privately with the rest owned by social landlords, who purposely kept properties empty to encourage tenants to leave the area.

A public enquiry into the scheme was held in 2006 which resulted in a decision that homes should be demolished to allow the scheme to take place, a decision which was upheld by then Deputy Prime Minister John Prescott in February 2006. Work on this part of the development did not commence and instead was delayed when the compulsory purchase order was challenged in the high court on a technical matter by one property owner from Adderley Street, who in 2006 won a High Court injunction to prevent demolition work from continuing. Campaigners challenged the compulsory purchase order at the high court in 2006 and were ultimately successful in having it quashed in November 2006.

Ministers approved a second order in September 2008, following a second public enquiry, to allow the council to acquire the last remaining properties. By the time the second order was issued, around 70 residents had yet to reach any agreement for the sale of their property, although roughly 90% of the properties affected were already either purchased or were in the process of being purchased.

Former Leader of Liverpool City Council, Warren Bradley, suggested that the scheme to regenerate the Edge Lane area had the overwhelming support of residents. In the lead up to European Capital of Culture 2008, the properties were given a fresher look by being covered in colourful decorated boarding showing images culturally important to the city. The second High Court challenge was dismissed in March 2009, allowing the compulsory purchase of remaining properties and for the scheme to go ahead.

The widened road, a dual-carriageway to and from the M62 motorway, opened in March 2012 at total cost of £57m including costs to demolish houses along the route.

== Transport connections ==
Edge Lane railway station was a former station that operated on the Canada Dock Branch, before it closed in May 1948. Bus route 7 (to Warrington) runs the full length of the road.

== Buildings of interest ==
=== Listed buildings ===
Edge Lane has several Grade II listed buildings.

Number/Name	Grade	Year listed	Description
91	II	1985	1840s built house
293	II	1975	1846 built house
307	II	1985	1850s built house, now part of convent
311	II	1975	1850s built house
Adelaide House	II	1975	1830s built house
Lodge to Botanic Gardens	II	1975	Lodge, dated 1836

=== Notable places ===
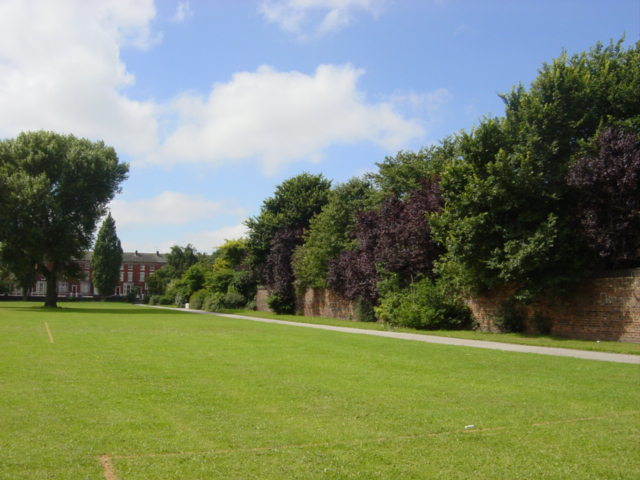
Wavertree Botanic Gardens, off Edge Lane

Amongst the more notable places of interest along Edge Lane include Edge Lane Retail Park, Littlewoods Pools building, The Grange and Wavertree Botanic Park and Gardens.
