= Botanic park =

Botanic park can refer specifically to :

- Botanic Park, Adelaide, a park in Adelaide, South Australia
- Wavertree Botanic Park and Gardens, a park in Liverpool

Botanic park can also refer generically to any Botanical garden
