= Grade II listed buildings in Liverpool-L7 =

Liverpool is a city and port in Merseyside, England, which contains many listed buildings. A listed building is a structure designated by English Heritage of being of architectural and/or of historical importance and, as such, is included in the National Heritage List for England. There are three grades of listing, according to the degree of importance of the structure. Grade I includes those buildings that are of "exceptional interest, sometimes considered to be internationally important"; the buildings in Grade II* are "particularly important buildings of more than special interest"; and those in Grade II are "nationally important and of special interest". Very few buildings are included in Grade I — only 2.5% of the total. Grade II* buildings represent 5.5% of the total, while the great majority, 92%, are included in Grade II.

Liverpool contains more than 1,550 listed buildings, of which 28 are in Grade I, 109 in Grade II*, and the rest in Grade II. (Note: These figures are taken from a search in the National Heritage List for England in May 2013, and are subject to variation as further buildings are listed, grades are revised, or buildings are delisted.) This list contains the Grade II listed buildings in the L7 postal district of Liverpool. The district stretches from buildings used by the University of Liverpool in the area around Abercromby Square in the west of the district, to the suburbs of Edge Hill and Kensington in the east. It is mainly residential, and a high proportion of the buildings in the list are houses. Residential development started in 1819–20 in Abercromby Square, and many of the houses here and elsewhere date from the 1820s, 1830s, and 1840s. To the east, the district includes Edge Hill railway station, the world's first railway station, and there are three Grade II listed buildings relating to it. Also in the district is Wavertree Botanic Gardens, which contains two Grade II listed buildings, the lodge and a fountain. In addition to these, this list contains three churches and a chapel (some of which have been converted into other uses), a library, a bank, a public house, a former hospital, the entrance to a cemetery, a students' union, a war memorial, and a pillar box.

Grade II listed buildings from other areas in the city can be found through the box on the right, along with the lists of the Grade I and Grade II* buildings in the city.

== Buildings ==
Name	Location	Photograph	Built	Notes
Garden House	Abercromby Square; 53.40283°N 2.96496°W		1822	Designed by John Foster, Senior, this is a circular building in the centre of the square, intended for storing garden tools. It is stuccoed, with a frieze and a cornice, and has a domed top. It is surrounded by a cast iron verandah.
Pillar box	Abercromby Square; 53.40229°N 2.96422°W		c. 1866	The pillar box stands at the corner of Abercromby Square and Chatham Street. It is hexagonal, in cast iron, with a cornice, and has a cap with an acorn finial.
—	1–7 and 7A Abercromby Square; 53.4029°N 2.9661°W		1820s	A terrace of eight brick houses with stone dressings and a hipped slate roof. They have three storeys and basements, and each house has three bays, other than the central house, which has five bays, and No 7A which has two. At the top of the building is a frieze and a cornice. The windows are sashes with wedge lintels. All the entrances have angle pilasters and entablatures, and some houses have balconies.
—	8 Abercromby Square; 53.4023°N 2.9656°W		c. 1830	A brick house with stone dressings and slate roofs. It has three storeys and a basement. The front is in eight bays, with five bays on the side. At the top of the building is a frieze and a cornice. The windows are sashes. The two entrances have pilasters and an entablature, and there is a first floor balcony.
—	9, 10 and 11 Abercromby Square; 53.4023°N 2.9651°W		c. 1830	Three brick houses with stone dressings and slate roofs. They have three storeys and basements. No 9 has three bays, and the others have four. At the top of the building is a frieze and a cornice. The windows are sashes with wedge lintels. One house has a Doric porch, the others have pilasters and an entablature.
—	12 Abercromby Square; 53.4023°N 2.9649°W		c. 1830	A brick house with stone dressings and slate roofs. It has three storeys and a basement, with a five-bay front. The entrance has pilasters and an entablature, and there is a first floor iron balcony.
—	13 Abercromby Square; 53.4023°N 2.9647°W		c. 1830	A brick house with stone dressings and slate roofs. It has three storeys and a basement, with a four-bay front. The entrance has pilasters and an entablature, and there is a first floor iron balcony.
—	14 Abercromby Square; 53.40226°N 2.96445°W		c. 1830	A brick house with stone dressings and slate roofs. It has three storeys and a basement, with a three-bay front. At the top of the building is a frieze and a cornice. The windows have wedge lintels; those in the first floor are casements and the others are sashes. The entrance has pilasters and an entablature, and there is a first floor balcony.
—	17 Abercromby Square; 53.40334°N 2.96421°W		c. 1830	A brick house with stone dressings and slate roofs. It has three storeys and a basement, with a single-bay front. At the top of the building is a frieze and a cornice. It has a two-storey rectangular bay window, above which are two windows with wedge lintels; all the windows are sashes. On the side is a porch with angle pilasters, a frieze, and a cornice.
—	18 and 19 Abercromby Square; 53.40335°N 2.96439°W		c. 1830	A brick house with stone dressings and slate roofs. It has three storeys and a basement, and has a seven-bay front. At the top of the building is a frieze and a cornice. The windows are sashes with wedge lintels. The entrance has a Doric porch, above which is an architrave, a frieze, and a consoled pediment. There is a first floor balcony.
—	20–27 Abercromby Square; 53.4034°N 2.9649°W		c. 1830	A terrace of brick houses with stone dressings and slate roofs. They have three storeys and basements, and stretch for 25 bays. At the top of the building is a frieze and a cornice. The windows have wedge lintels, and most are sashes. One entrance has a Doric porch; others have angle pilasters and entablature. Some of the houses also have first floor balconies.
Students Union (old part)	2 Bedford Street North; 53.4056°N 2.9659°W		1910–13	The students' union was designed by Charles Reilly in a variety of styles. It is constructed in brick and stone, and has three storeys and basement. The west side is in Regency style, with a bow window, Doric columns on the ground floor, and pairs of baluster-like columns above. The north side has six bays, a large Beaux-Arts balcony, pedimented windows in the first floor, and round windows above. Inside is the Gilmour Hall, originally a debating chamber, later converted into a bar, with large Doric columns, and a compartmented ceiling. The interior also contains two spiral staircases.
—	78, 80 and 82 Bedford Street South; 53.4020°N 2.9662°W		1840s	A terrace of three stuccoed houses with slate roofs. They are in two storeys and basements, and each house has three bays. No 80 projects forward under an open pediment and is flanked by pilasters. It has a canted porch with a frieze and a cornice. It also has a canted bay window with casements. All the other windows in the terrace are sashes, and each house has a first floor iron balcony. No 78 also has a verandah, and No 82 has canted ground floor bay windows.
—	120 and 122 Bedford Street South; 53.4002°N 2.9665°W		1830s	A pair of stuccoed houses with stone dressings and slate roofs. They are in three storeys and a basement, and each house is in three bays. At the top of the building is a frieze and a cornice. The windows are sashes, those in the ground and first floor have architraves. Each house has a first floor window with a pediment, and an Ionic porch.
—	124 and 126 (now 122) Bedford Street South; 53.4001°N 2.9665°W		1830s	A pair of houses. They have three storeys with basements, and are in five bays. At the top of the building is a cornice. All the windows have wedge lintels; those in the first floor are sashes, and in the top floor are casements. The entrances are round-headed, and No 124 has a doorcase with one remaining Tuscan column.
—	132 Bedford Street South; 53.39921°N 2.96661°W		1820s	A brick house with stone dressings and a slate roof. It has three storeys and a basement. The house is in three bays. At the top of the building is a frieze and a cornice. The windows are casements with wedge lintels. The entrance has pilasters and an entablature.
—	134 Bedford Street South; 53.39916°N 2.96662°W		1820s	A brick house with stone dressings and a slate roof. It has three storeys and a basement. The house is in three bays. At the top of the building is a frieze and a cornice. The windows are casements with wedge lintels. The entrance has pilasters and an entablature.
—	151–163 Bedford Street South; 53.3985°N 2.9662°W		1830s	A terrace of seven brick houses with stone dressings and a hipped slate roof. They are in three storeys and basements, and each house is in three bays. At the top of the building is a frieze and a cornice. The windows are sashes with wedge lintels. The entrances have pilasters and entablatures.
Beech Mount	Beech Street; 53.4113°N 2.9431°W		1861	A terrace of four brick houses, partly stuccoed, with a slate roof, and rusticated quoins. They have two storeys, and each house is in three bays. Every house has a canted bay window in the ground floor, with a cornice. All the windows are sashes with architraves. The entrances are round-headed with entablatures.
Elm Terrace	Beech Street; 53.4107°N 2.9437°W		c. 1860	A terrace of four stuccoed houses (originally seven), with a slate roof. They have two storeys, and each house is in three bays. All the windows are casements, with varying surrounds. Other architectural features include friezes and cornices.
Oak Terrace	Beech Street; 53.4110°N 2.9439°W		c. 1860	A terrace of six stuccoed houses (originally nine), with a slate roof, in two storeys. Two houses have two bays; the others have three. All the windows are casements, with varying surrounds. Other architectural features include friezes, cornices, and two two-storey canted bay windows.
—	2 and 4 Cambridge Street; 53.4024°N 2.9667°W		1820s	Two brick house with stone dressings and slate roofs. They are in three storeys and basements, and each house has two bays. At the top of the building is a cornice. The windows are sashes with wedge lintels. The round-headed entrances have Doric doorcases with fluted columns.
Welsh Presbyterian Chapel	Chatham Street; 53.4017°N 2.9639°W		1860–61	Designed as a chapel by Oliver and Lamb, it is in Italianate style. It has subsequently been converted into a studio and offices for the University of Liverpool. The chapel was constructed in limestone and brick, with a slate roof. The entrance is in the west front, which has five bays, with seven bays along the sides. The bays in the west front are separated by large Composite pilasters, and the central three bays project forward under a pediment, behind which are three doors.
—	90 Chatham Street; 53.4022°N 2.9644°W		1820s	A brick house with stone dressings and a slate roof. It has three storeys and a basement. There are eight bays along Chatham Street, and three facing Abercromby Square. At the top of the building is a frieze and a cornice. The first three bays on Chatham Street break forward and have a Mansard roof. The windows are sashes with wedge lintels. The entrance has angle pilasters and an entablature.
—	142–148 Chatham Street; 53.4004°N 2.9646°W		1820s	Three brick houses with stone dressings and a slate roof. They have three storeys and basements; each house has three bays. At the top of the building is a frieze and a cornice. The windows are sashes with wedge lintels. The round-headed entrances have Doric doorcases with fluted columns.
—	150–154 Chatham Street; 53.4002°N 2.9647°W		1820s	Three brick houses with stone dressings and a slate roof. They have three storeys and basements; each house has three bays. At the top of the building is a frieze and a cornice. The windows are sashes with wedge lintels. The round-headed entrances have Doric doorcases.
—	156, 158 and 160 Chatham Street; 53.3999°N 2.9647°W		1820s	Three brick houses with stone dressings and a slate roof. They have three storeys and basements; each house has three bays. At the top of the building is a frieze and a cornice. The windows are sashes with wedge lintels. The round-headed entrances have Doric columns.
—	161 Chatham Street; 53.40009°N 2.96423°W		1820s	A brick house with stone dressings and a slate roof. It has two storeys and a basement, and is in three bays. At the top of the building is a cornice. The windows are sashes with wedge lintels, and the entrance is round-headed.
—	162 and 164 Chatham Street; 53.39980°N 2.96471°W		1820s	Two brick house with stone dressings and slate roofs. They have three storeys and basements; each house has three bays. At the top of the building is a frieze and a cornice. The windows have wedge lintels; those in No 162 are casements; those in No 164 are sashes. The round-headed entrances have Doric doorcase with fluted columns.
—	163 Chatham Street; 53.40000°N 2.96424°W		1820s	A stuccoed house with stone dressings and a slate roof. It has two storeys and a basement, and is in three bays. At the top of the building is a cornice. The windows are sashes, those on the first floor having architraves. The round-headed entrance has a Doric doorcases with fluted columns, and an archivolt.
—	165 Chatham Street; 53.39991°N 2.96426°W		1820s	A stuccoed house with stone dressings and a slate roof. It has two storeys and a basement, and is in three bays. At the top of the building is a cornice. The windows are casements with wedge lintels. The round-headed entrance has an archivolt with a honeysuckle frieze.
—	166 and 168 Chatham Street; 53.3997°N 2.9647°W		1820s	Two brick house with stone dressings and slate roofs. They have three storeys and basements; each house has two bays. At the top of the building is a frieze and a cornice. The windows are sashes with wedge lintels. The round-headed entrances have panelled doorcases.
—	167 Chatham Street; 53.39981°N 2.96429°W		1820s	A brick house with stone dressings and a slate roof. It has two storeys and a basement, and is in three bays. At the top of the building is a cornice. The windows are casements with wedge lintels. The round-headed entrance has a Doric doorcase.
—	169 Chatham Street; 53.39970°N 2.96429°W		1820s	A brick house with stone dressings and a slate roof. It has two storeys and a basement, and is in three bays. At the top of the building is a cornice. The windows are casements with wedge lintels. The round-headed entrance has a Doric doorcase with fluted columns.
—	170 and 172 Chatham Street; 53.39959°N 2.96474°W		1820s	Two brick house with stone dressings and slate roofs. They have three storeys and basements; each house has two bays. At the top of the building is a frieze and a cornice. The windows have wedge lintels; No 170 has casement windows, and No 172 has sash windows. The round-headed entrances have panelled doorcases.
—	171 Chatham Street; 53.39960°N 2.96430°W		1816	A brick house with stone dressings and a slate roof. It has two storeys and a basement, and is in three bays. At the top of the building is a cornice. A two-storey canted bay window has been added. The window above the door is a casement; the other windows are sashes. The entrance is round-headed.
—	1, 1A and 1B Church Mount; 53.40640°N 2.95547°W		1830s	A brick house with stone dressings and a slate roof, later divided into three flats. It has two storeys and an attic, with two bays on each front. It has a pedimented gables, and on the Towerlands Street front is a cornice. The windows are casements with wedge lintels. The entrance is round-headed with a panelled doorcase.
—	2 and 2A Church Mount, 1 and 2 Holland Place; 53.4062°N 2.9554°W		1830s	Four brick houses with stone dressings and slate roofs. They have a mix of one, two and three bays, sash and casement windows, Ionic and Doric doorcases. All the windows have wedge lintels. At the top of the building is a cornice. The houses on Holland Place have French windows.
—	3 Church Mount; 53.40640°N 2.95523°W		1830s	A brick house with stone dressings and a slate roof. It has two storeys and a basement, and is in three bays. At the top of the building is a cornice. The windows are casements with wedge lintels. The round-headed entrance has a Doric doorcase with fluted columns.
—	4 Church Mount; 53.40622°N 2.95499°W		1830s	A brick house with stone dressings and a slate roof. It has two storeys, and is in two bays. At the top of the building is a cornice. The windows are casements with wedge lintels. The round-headed entrance has a Doric doorcase.
—	5 Church Mount, 16C Marmaduke Street; 53.40661°N 2.95473°W		1830s	A brick house with stone dressings and a slate roof. It has two storeys, and is in three bays. At the top of the building is a cornice and a gable. The windows are casements with wedge lintels. The round-headed entrance has a Doric doorcase with fluted columns.
—	8 Church Mount, 18–22 Marmaduke Street; 53.4062°N 2.9548°W		1814	Three brick houses with stone dressings and slate roofs. They have two storeys and basements, and each house is in three bays. At the top of the building is a cornice. The windows have wedge lintels; most of the windows are sashes, but No 20 Marmaduke Street has casements.
Screen wall and railings, Jewish Cemetery	Deane Road; 53.41147°N 2.94596°W		1836	This constitutes the entrance to a cemetery that opened in 1837 and closed in 1904. The entrance consists of a gateway in Greek Revival style, with an archivolt and a Doric aedicule, the architrave of which has an inscription. The entablature incorporates a frieze carved with five wreathes. The gateway is flanked by decorative iron railings containing gates.
—	11 Deane Road; 53.4112°N 2.9450°W		1840s	A stuccoed house with a slate roof. It has two storeys and a basement, and is in five bays. At the top of the house is a cornice and an embattled parapet. The end bays have gables and buttresses rising to pinnacles. On the front are two canted bay windows. All the windows are casements. The entrance is in the centre, with an architrave.
—	15 Deane Road; 53.4111°N 2.9449°W		1840s	A stuccoed house with a slate roof. It has two storeys, and is in two bays. At the top of the house is a cornice and a coped parapet. In the ground floor is a canted oriel window. The windows are mullioned and transomed casements. Buttresses flank the projecting entrance.
St Cyprian's Church	Durning Road; 53.4080°N 2.9480°W		1879–81	The church was designed by Henry Summers, the roof was reconstructed in 1896–98, and vestries were added in 1916. It is constructed in stone, and has slate roofs. It consists of a nave with narrow aisles and a clerestory, a three-bay north transept, and a chancel. There is a west tower with buttresses and pinnacles, and a higher stair turret. In the clerestory are six large mullioned and transomed windows, above each of which is a gablet. Inside the church are round-arched arcades with Romanesque capitals.
Inter City Recovery Service	63 Durning Road; 53.4058°N 2.9486°W		1870s	Built as a fire station, later used as a garage. It is constructed in ashlar stone, and has a hipped slate roof. It has two storeys, and is in four bays. At the top of the house is an embattled parapet. In the ground floor are two four-centred arches, a six-light mullioned window, and an entrance. On the front of the building is an inscribed band, and hood moulds carved with beasts.
War memorial	Earle Road; 53.39881°N 2.94371°W		1921	The war memorial originally stood in front of St Dunstan's church, and was later moved across the road to the south of the church. It is in sandstone, and consists of a square two-stepped base, a square plinth, and a square block. On the block is a tall Celtic cross, richly decorated with interlace designs and geometric patterns. On the block is an inscription, and on the plinth is a plaque containing the names of those lost in the First World War.
—	2 Edge Lane; 53.40708°N 2.95597°W		1830s	A brick house with stone dressings and a slate roof. It has two storeys, and is in three bays. At the top of the building is a cornice. The windows are sashes with wedge lintels. The entrance is round-headed with an Ionic doorcase. On the right side is a gable with an open pediment.
—	4 and 6 Edge Lane; 53.40708°N 2.95590°W		1830s	Two brick houses with stone dressings and slate roofs. They have two storeys, and each house is in three bays. At the top of the building is a cornice. The windows are sashes with wedge lintels. The entrances are round-headed with Ionic doorcases.
—	8 Edge Lane; 53.40710°N 2.95558°W		1830s	A brick house with stone dressings and a slate roof. It has three storeys and a basement, and is in two bays. At the top of the building is a frieze and a cornice. The windows are sashes with wedge lintels. The entrance has a flat architrave and a cornice.
—	10 Edge Lane; 53.40713°N 2.95548°W		1830s	A brick house with stone dressings and a slate roof. It has three storeys and a basement, and is in two bays. At the top of the building is a frieze and a cornice. The windows are sashes with wedge lintels. The entrance is round-headed with an Ionic doorcase.
—	12A Edge Lane; 53.40715°N 2.95470°W		1830s	A brick house with stone dressings and a slate roof. It is in three storeys with a basement. It has two bays on Edge Lane, two on Marmaduke Street, and a three-bay two-storey extension to the right. At the top of the left section is a cornice. The windows are sashes with wedge lintels. The entrance has flat pilasters and an entablature.
Adelaide House	115 Edge Lane; 53.4075°N 2.9519°W		1830s	A brick house with stone dressings and a tiled roof. It has two storeys and a basement, is in three bays, and has a 20th-century three-bay extension to the right. The windows are sashes with wedge lintels. The entrance is round-headed with a Doric doorcase.
Lodge, Botanic Gardens	144 Edge Lane; 53.4081°N 2.9441°W		1836–37	A stone lodge in Greek Revival style, with two storeys, and a square plan. The front facing the street has four bays, the outer two breaking forward and flanked by flat pilasters. It has two entrances, and contains casement windows. At the sides of the lodge are rusticated screen walls ending in piers with lotus capitals and caps.
—	293 Edge Lane; 53.4090°N 2.9412°W		1846	A brick house with stone dressings and a slate roof, standing on a stone plinth. It has two storeys, and is in three bays. On the front is a two-storey bay window and a porch with flat pilasters, a cornice and a balcony. On the upper floor is an oriel window with a pierced balustrade above, and a shaped gable. On the left side are four more gables.
Lisieux House	309 (previously 311) Edge Lane; 53.4097°N 2.9367°W		1850s	A stuccoed house with a slate roof. It has two storeys, and is in four bays. In the first floor are angle pilasters. In the ground floor are three-light windows, and the windows in the first floor have architraves; all the windows are sashes. The entrance has a Doric porch.
The Octagon	Grove Street; 53.4010°N 2.9619°W		1867	A house designed by J. W. Hayward for his own use, applying his ideas on heating and ventilation. It is constructed in brick with stone dressings and a slate roof, and has some Gothic details. It has three storeys and an attic, and has three bays. Architectural features include a porch between columns carrying a balcony, a turret on the right, an oriel window, and dormers. The design includes a massive chimney that carried smoke and the foul air from the house.
—	190, 192 and 194 Grove Street; 53.3990°N 2.9625°W		1830s	Three brick houses with stone dressings and slate roofs. They have three storeys and basements, and each house is in two bays. At the top of the building is a frieze and a cornice. The windows are casements with wedge lintels. The entrances have flat pilasters and entablatures.
—	198 and 200 Grove Street; 53.3975°N 2.9618°W		1830s	Two brick houses with stone dressings and a slate roof. They have three storeys and a basement, and are in five bays. At the top of the building is a cornice. The windows are casements with wedge lintels. The entrances have angle pilasters and entablatures.
Lamp standard	Holland Place; 53.40613°N 2.95589°W		Late 19th century	A richly decorated iron lamp standard, it has scrolls around its base, and carries three 20th-century lamps.
University Hall (old part)	Holly Road; 53.4098°N 2.9414°W		1840s	Originally a house, later extensions added to create a university hall. It is a stuccoed building with a slate roof, in two storeys with three bays. The central bay projects forward under a pediment. On the top of the building is an entablature and a cornice. The windows are sashes with architraves. At the entrance is an Ionic colonnade.
—	12 Holly Road; 53.4101°N 2.9395°W		1840s	A stuccoed house with a slate roof, in two storeys and five bays. The central bay projects forward under a pediment. On the top of the building is an entablature and a cornice. Most of the windows are sashes with architraves, other than casements flanking the entrance. Some of the windows also have friezes and cornices. The entrance has flat pilasters and an entablature.
—	14 Holly Road; 53.4102°N 2.9390°W		1840s	A stuccoed house with a slate roof, in two storeys with an attic, and five bays. The end bay projects forward under a gable. On the top of the building is a cornice. On the left is a canted bay window. The windows are mullioned and ransomed with casements.
St Mary's Church (All Saints parish church from 2011)	Irvine Street; 53.4066°N 2.9564°W		1812–13	The church is constructed in brick with stone dressings, and has a slate roof; it was extended in 1825. It consists of a nave, a very short chancel with a canted apse, and a slender west tower embraced by porches and gallery stairs. Inside are galleries on three sides. The east window has five lights with Perpendicular style tracery.
—	33 Irvine Street; 53.40674°N 2.95786°W		c. 1815–20	A brick house with stone dressings and a slate roof. It has two storeys and a basement, and is in three bays. At the top of the building is a cornice. The windows are casements with wedge lintels. The entrance is round-headed. The garden wall has railings, and is included in the designation.
—	35 and 37 Irvine Street; 53.40673°N 2.95777°W		c. 1815–20	Two brick houses with stone dressings and a slate roof. They have three storeys and a basement, and each house is in two bays. At the top of the building is a cornice. The windows are sashes with wedge lintels. The round-headed entrances have angle pilasters and archivolts with keystones. The garden walls have iron railings, and these are included in the designation.
—	39 Irvine Street; 53.40669°N 2.95756°W		c. 1815–20	A brick house with stone dressings and a slate roof. It has three storeys and a basement, and is in three bays. At the top of the building is a cornice. The windows are sashes with wedge lintels. The entrance is round-headed. The garden wall has railings and stone gate piers, and is included in the designation.
—	41 and 43 Irvine Street; 53.40666°N 2.95747°W		c. 1815–20	Two brick houses with stone dressings and slate roofs. They have three storeys and basements; each house is in three bays. At the top of the building is a cornice. The windows are sashes with wedge lintels. The entrances are round-headed. The garden walls have railings and stone gate piers, and these are included in the designation.
—	45 Irvine Street; 53.40656°N 2.95707°W		c. 1815–20	A brick house with stone dressings and a slate roof. It has three storeys and a basement, and is in two bays. At the top of the building is a cornice. The windows are sashes with wedge lintels. In a porch on the left side is a round-headed entrance. The garden wall is coped with railings and stone gate piers, and is included in the designation.
—	47 Irvine Street; 53.40653°N 2.95697°W		c. 1815–20	A brick house with stone dressings and a slate roof. It has two storeys and a basement, and is in three bays. At the top of the building is a cornice. The windows are sashes with wedge lintels. The round-headed entrance has a Doric doorcase. The window above has an architrave, a frieze, and a pediment. The garden wall is coped with railings and stone gate piers with an iron overthrow, and is included in the designation.
Christ Church	Kensington; 53.4116°N 2.9526°W		1870	A church, now redundant, designed by William and George Audsley, and constructed in polychromic brick and stone. It is in North Italian Romanesque style, and consists of a nave with aisles and clerestory, a chancel with transepts, and an almost detached northwest tower. Inside is an arcade carried on granite columns with Byzantine capitals.
Public Library	Kensington; 53.4116°N 2.9535°W		1890	This was the first branch library in Liverpool, it was designed by Thomas Shelmerdine, and was extended in 1897. It is an asymmetrical building in red brick with stone dressings and a tiled roof. It has an octagonal timber lantern surmounted by a cupola. The entrance porch has a semicircular pediment and Ionic columns. The wing to the left of the entrance has a large round-headed mullioned and transomed window and a small gable. The right wing has a Venetian window, an arcaded parapet, and a shaped gable.
Barclays Bank	302 and 304 Kensington; 53.4120°N 2.9463°W		1898	Built for the Bank of Liverpool, it was designed by James Rhind in Neo-Baroque style. It is constructed in brick and Portland stone. There is a recessed canted corner bay, with two more bays on Kensington, and three on Deane Road. On the Deane Road side is an octagonal turret with a cupola. Above the entrance is an oriel window with Ionic columns.
—	22 Lilley Road; 53.41175°N 2.93912°W		1850s	A stuccoed house with a tiled roof, in two storeys, and three bays. The first bay has a canted bay window. The other windows have architraves, friezes, and cornices, and all are sashes. On the right side is a porch with a round-headed entrance.
Hailes House	39 Lilley Road		1840s	A stuccoed house with a tiled roof, in two storeys and an attic, and three bays. The windows have architraves. The central round-headed entrance projects forward under a segmental pediment.
—	11 and 13 Lockerby Road; 53.4115°N 2.9399°W		1840s	A pair of stuccoed houses with slate roofs, in two storeys with attics. Each house has three bays. The middle bays project under pediments; they have canted bay windows and pierced parapets. The entrances are round-headed.
—	17 Lockerby Road; 53.4110°N 2.9397°W		1840s	A stuccoed house with a hipped slate roof, in two storeys with an attic, and three bays. The ground floor windows project, and have angle pilasters, an entablature and a pierced parapet; they are in three lights, are mullioned and contain casements. The entrance is round-headed with a keystone and a Doric aedicule. The upper floor windows are sashes.
Clare Terrace	2–16 Marmaduke Street; 53.4069°N 2.9547°W		Early 19th century	A terrace of eight stuccoed houses with slate roofs. They have two storeys with attics, and each house is in three bays. At the top of the building is a cornice. Two of the houses project forward under a pediment. Most of the ground floor windows are sashes; most of the upper floor windows are casements with architraves. The entrances have flat pilasters.
—	24 Marmaduke Street; 53.4059°N 2.9547°W		1814	A brick house with stone dressings and a slate roof. It has two storeys and a basement, and is in three bays. At the top of the building is a cornice. The windows are sashes with wedge lintels. The entrance is canted, with an architrave and a cornice.
—	26 Marmaduke Street; 53.40583°N 2.95471°W		1814	A brick house with stone dressings and a slate roof. It has three storeys and a basement, and is in two bays. At the top of the building is a cornice. In the ground floor is a canted bay window. All the windows are sashes with architraves. There is a 20th-century balcony on the second floor.
—	28 Marmaduke Street; 53.40577°N 2.95468°W		1814	A brick house with stone dressings and a slate roof. It has three storeys and a basement, and is in two bays. At the top of the building is a frieze and a cornice. The windows are sashes with wedge lintels. The entrance is round-headed with a Doric doorcase.
Eye and Ear Infirmary	Myrtle Street; 53.4016°N 2.9689°W		1878–80	Built as a hospital, later used as a college building, and converted into flats in 2003. It is constructed in red brick, terracotta, and sandstone, and has a tiled roof. It has timber-framed gables. The building has three storeys, an attic and basement. It has a nine-bay front, and five bays down the sides. There is a two-bay, two-storey extension. Features include friezes, oriel windows, dormers, and prominent chimneys.
—	6 and 7 North View; 53.40707°N 2.95769°W		c. 1815–20	Two brick houses with stone dressings and a slate roof. They have three storeys and a basement, each house having three bays. At the top of the building is a cornice. The windows have wedge lintels; most are sashes, but those in the upper floor of No 6 are casements. The entrances are round-headed.
—	8 and 9 North View; 53.40707°N 2.95741°W		c. 1815–20	Two brick houses with stone dressings and a slate roof. They have three storeys and a basement, each house being in a single bay. At the top of the building is a frieze and a cornice. The windows are sashes with wedge lintels. The round-headed entrances have archivolts with keystones.
—	10 North View; 53.40708°N 2.95726°W		c. 1815–20	A brick house with stone dressings and a slate roof. It has two storeys and a basement, and is in two bays. At the top of the building is a cornice. The windows are sashes with wedge lintels. The entrance on the left side is through a doorway with an elliptical head.
—	11 and 12 North View; 53.40708°N 2.95697°W		c. 1815–20	Two brick houses with stone dressings and a slate roof. They have two storeys and a basement, each house being in two bays. At the top of the building is a cornice. The windows are sashes with wedge lintels. The entrances have elliptical heads.
—	13 North View; 53.40707°N 2.95673°W		c. 1815–20	A brick house with stone dressings and a slate roof. It has two storeys and a basement, and is in three bays. At the top of the building is a cornice. The windows are sashes with wedge lintels. The round-headed entrance has a doorcase with triple columns.
—	14 North View; 53.4071°N 2.9565°W		1828	A brick house with stone dressings and a slate roof. It has two storeys and a basement. This a curved corner bay, with three bays on North View, and two bays on Towerlands Street. At the top of the building is a cornice. The windows are sashes with wedge lintels. The entrance has a doorcase with triple columns.
St Anne's Church	Overbury Street; 53.4032°N 2.9537°W		1843–46	The Roman Catholic church was designed by Charles Hansom, enlarged in 1888–89 by Pugin & Pugin, and a baptistry was added in 1893 by Peter Paul Pugin. It is a large church, constructed in sandstone with a slate roof. It consists of a nave with aisles and a clerestory, a chancel with an apse, transepts, and an octagonal west tower.
Presbytery, St Anne's Church	Overbury Street; 53.40335°N 2.95392°W		1893	The presbytery was designed by Peter Paul Pugin. It is in stone with a slate roof, and has three storeys and an attic. There are three bays, the first of which projects forward with a two-storey canted oriel window under a gable. The porch is enclosed, and has a pierced parapet. There are two timber dormers. On the right side are buttresses, and canopied niches.
Memorial, St Anne's Church	Overbury Street; 53.40306°N 2.95408°W		1855	A stone memorial to two members of the Linford family by A. Murphy. It consists of an octagonal pillar, standing on a plinth, and has a niche and a canopy. At the top are two figures.
—	14 Oxford Street; 53.40327°N 2.96772°W		c. 1820	A brick house with stone dressings and a slate roof. It has two storeys and a basement, and is in two bays. At the top of the building is a frieze and a cornice. The windows are sashes with wedge lintels. The round-headed entrance has a Doric doorcase with fluted columns.
—	16 and 18 Oxford Street; 53.40328°N 2.96757°W		c. 1820	Two brick houses with stone dressings and slate roofs. They have three storeys and a basement, and each house has two bays. At the top of the building is a cornice. The windows are sashes with wedge lintels. The round-headed entrances have Doric doorcases with fluted columns.
—	20–26 Oxford Street; 53.40326°N 2.96727°W		c. 1820	A terrace of four brick houses with stone dressings and slate roofs. They have three storeys and a basement, and each house has two bays. At the top of the building is a cornice. The windows are sashes with wedge lintels. The round-headed entrances have Doric doorcases with fluted columns.
—	28 Oxford Street; 53.40324°N 2.96706°W		c. 1820	A brick house with stone dressings and a slate roof. It has three storeys and a basement, and is in two bays. At the top of the building is a cornice. The windows are sashes with wedge lintels. The round-headed entrance has a Doric doorcase with fluted columns.
—	30 Oxford Street; 53.40325°N 2.96697°W		c. 1820	A brick house, later a shop, with stone dressings and a slate roof. It has three storeys and a basement, and is in two bays. At the top of the building is a cornice. The windows are sashes with wedge lintels. In the ground floor is an inserted shop front with panelled pilasters, a frieze and a cornice.
—	10 and 12 Prescot Road; 53.41223°N 2.94324°W		1840s	Two stuccoed houses with a slate roof. They have two storeys and a basement, and are in seven bays with a pediment over he central bay. The outer bays are flanked by panelled pilasters. The windows have architraves, those in the ground floor are sashes, and those in the upper floor are casements. The entrances have angle pilasters and entablatures, and in the upper floor are balconies.
Boundary Public House	Smithdown Road; 53.3983°N 2.9495°W		1902	A brick public house on a red granite base, with a slate roof, and a lead-covered cupola. It is in Jacobean Revival style. There are three curved bays on the corner, flanked by three bays on each side. At the top is a frieze, a cornice and a parapet. Other features include mullioned and transomed windows, balconies, shaped gables with finials, a bay window, and a hipped half-dormer.
—	1 Smithdown Road; 53.3985°N 2.9491°W		1903	Originally a bank, the building is in stone with a granite base. It has three storeys, a basement, and is surmounted b a cupola. There is a corner bay, two bays on each side, and single storey extensions. The entrance is flanked by Tuscan columns, in the first floor are paired Ionic columns, and in the second floor are paired Corinthian columns. There are further decorative features around and between the windows.
St Mary's Vicarage	Towerlands Street; 53.40689°N 2.95645°W		c. 1815	A brick house with stone dressings and a slate roof. It has two storeys and a basement, and is in three bays. At the top of the building is a cornice. The windows are sashes with wedge lintels. The windows above the entrance have architraves, friezes, and cornices. The entrance is round-headed.
—	11 Towerlands Street; 53.40656°N 2.95548°W		1830s	A brick house with stone dressings and a slate roof. It has two storeys and a rendered basement, and is in two bays. At the top of the building is a frieze and a cornice. The windows are sashes with wedge lintels. The entrance is round-headed.
-	15 (listed as 13) Towerlands Street; 53.3963°N 2.9435°W		1830s	A brick house with stone dressings and a slate roof. It has two storeys and a basement, and is in three bays. At the top of the building is a cornice. The windows are sashes with wedge lintels. The entrance is round-headed with flat pilasters.
Monumental mason's yard	Toxteth Park Cemetery; 53.40648°N 2.95548°W		1850s	Yard with showroom and office, gateway and boundary walls and gates.
Carriage ramps and tunnel entrance	Tunnel Road; 53.40285°N 2.94855°W		1836	These consists of two carriage ramps leading from the street to the original Edge Hill railway station, and the entrance to the first tunnel leading down to Lime Street station. The structures are in rusticated red sandstone.
Entrance to Waterloo Tunnel	Tunnel entrance 53.40300°N 2.94862°W		1847	Waterloo Tunnel was built for the Liverpool and Manchester Railway to lead down to the north docks. It is in stone, and consists of a round arch flanked by buttresses, both with vermiculated rustication. At the top is a cornice with a coped parapet.
Hydraulic plant house and accumulator tower	Tunnel Road; 53.40263°N 2.94640°W		1882	These were built to supply hydraulic power to Edge Hill Gridiron, a railway marshalling yard. The plant house is in stone, and has three bays. The lower part is rusticated, and at the top is a frieze and a cornice. The windows are casements under round arches with keystones. The accumulator tower is in brick with an iron cornice, and has clasping pilasters.
—	28 – 38 Upper Hope Place; 53.4005°N 2.9704°W		Early 19th century	A terrace of six brick houses with stone dressings and a slate roof. They have three storeys and basements, and each house is in two bays. At the top of the building is a frieze and a cornice. The windows are sashes with wedge lintels. The entrances are round-headed, and the doorcases are flanked by panelled pilasters.
Fountain	Wavertree Park; 53.40530°N 2.94212°W		Late 19th century	This consists of a fountain and lamp standard in the centre of the park, constructed in stone and iron. At its base are two tiers of stone basins. The iron centrepiece consists of two shell-shaped basins supported by Liver birds, with fish between them. The lamp standard is decorated with foliage.
—	1–7 Wavertree Road, 30 Marmaduke Street; 53.4056°N 2.9547°W		1820s	A terrace of five brick houses with stone dressings and a slate roof, in three storeys. Two have later been converted into shops, and one into a public house. At the top of the building is a cornice. Most of the windows are casements with wedge lintels. The entrances are varied.

== See also ==
Architecture of Liverpool
