= Christ Church, Kensington =

Church in Liverpool, Merseyside, England

Coordinates: 53.4116°N 2.9526°W

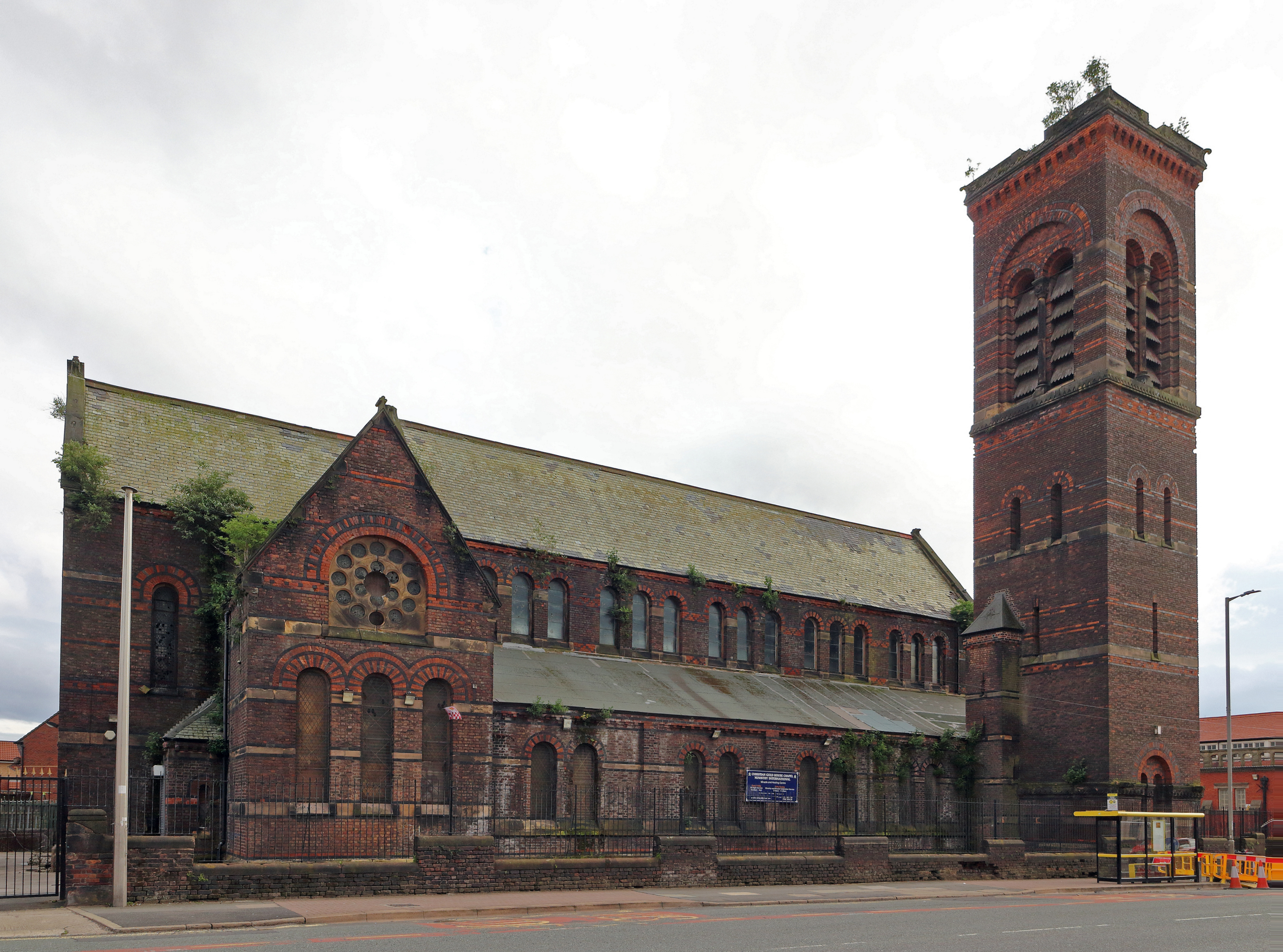
Christ Church, Kensington, from the northeast

Christ Church is in the Kensington area of Liverpool, Merseyside, England. The church is recorded in the National Heritage List for England as a designated Grade II listed building.

== History ==
Christ Church was built as an Anglican parish church in 1870, and designed by W. & G. Audsley. It closed as an Anglican church in 1975, and then used for storage. In 2002 it re-opened for worship. Since 2002 it has been used by the Gilbert Deya Ministries. Since 2018 the building has been used by Christian Gold House Chapel as seen on Channel 5.

In 2022 it was added to Historic England's at risk register.

== Architecture ==
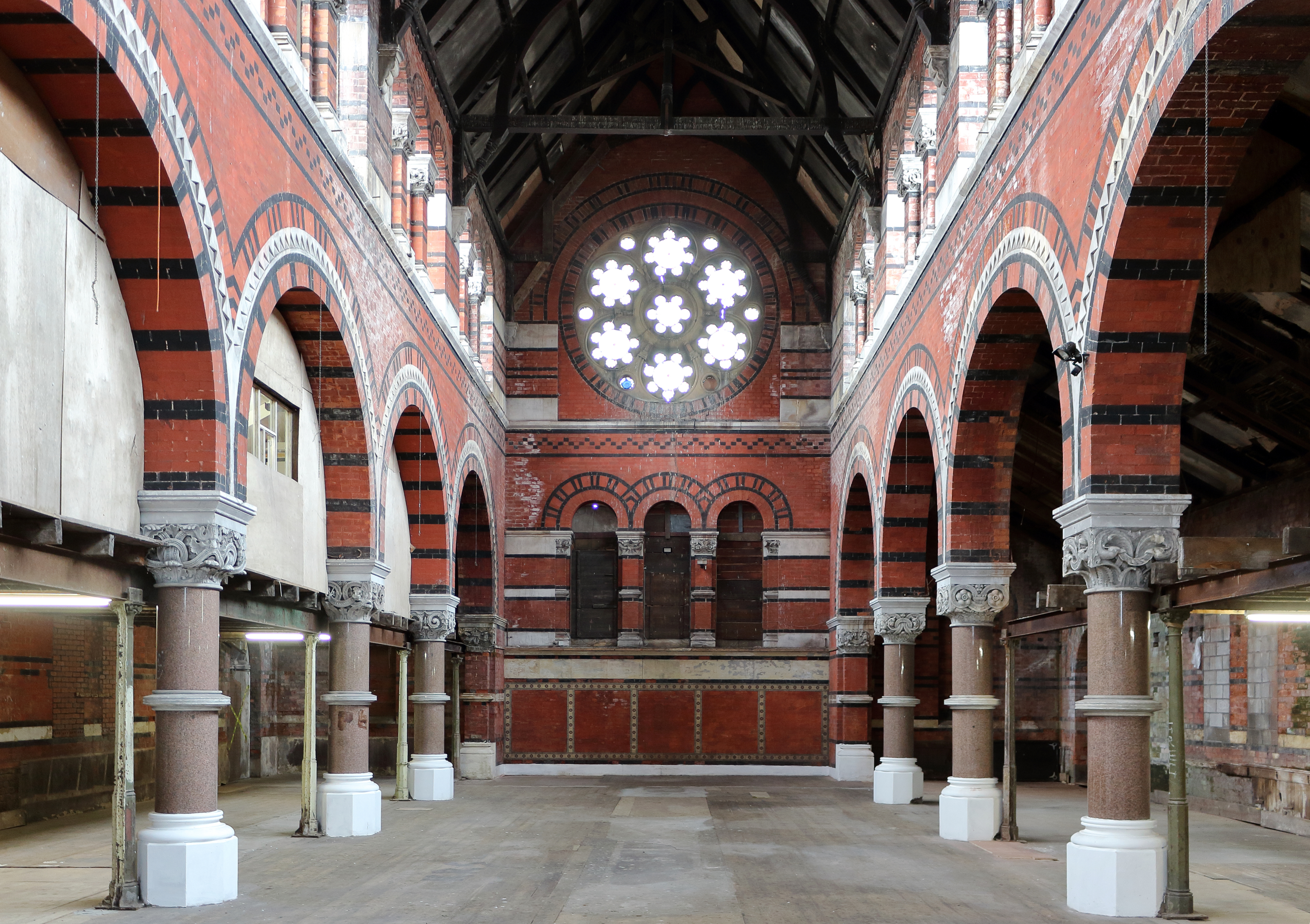
The nave

The church is in North Italian Romanesque style, and constructed in common brick with polychromatic decoration in red and blue brick and stone, inside and outside the building. There is a tall northwest tower, almost detached, which originally had a pyramidal roof. All the windows are round-headed, other than a large round window in the west end. Inside the church, the arcades have round arches and are carried on granite piers with Byzantine capitals. All the fittings have been removed apart from the reredos which consists of an arcade. Remnants of the Audsley stained glass have survived.

== See also ==
- Grade II listed buildings in Liverpool-L7
