= International Exhibition of Navigation, Commerce and Industry =

1886 exhibition in Liverpool, England

Coordinates: 53.407°N 2.942°W

The International Exhibition of Navigation, Commerce and Industry in Liverpool, England, was opened by Queen Victoria on 11 May 1886.

The fair was held in Antwerp's exhibition hall which was transported for the exhibition and erected alongside Wavertree Botanic Gardens. Additional attractions were the chance to visit the SS Great Eastern, and to see a lifesize copy of the Eddystone Lighthouse and the rowing boat in which Grace Darling and her father rescued stranded occupants of a wrecked ship.

Exhibitions from parts of the British Empire outside the United Kingdom included an African village, 50 "natives of Indian and Ceylon", camel and elephant rides, and a Canadian toboggan ride

It was followed in 1887 by the Royal Jubilee Exhibition also in Liverpool.
