= The Grange (Kensington) =

Former military installation in Liverpool

- Liverpool
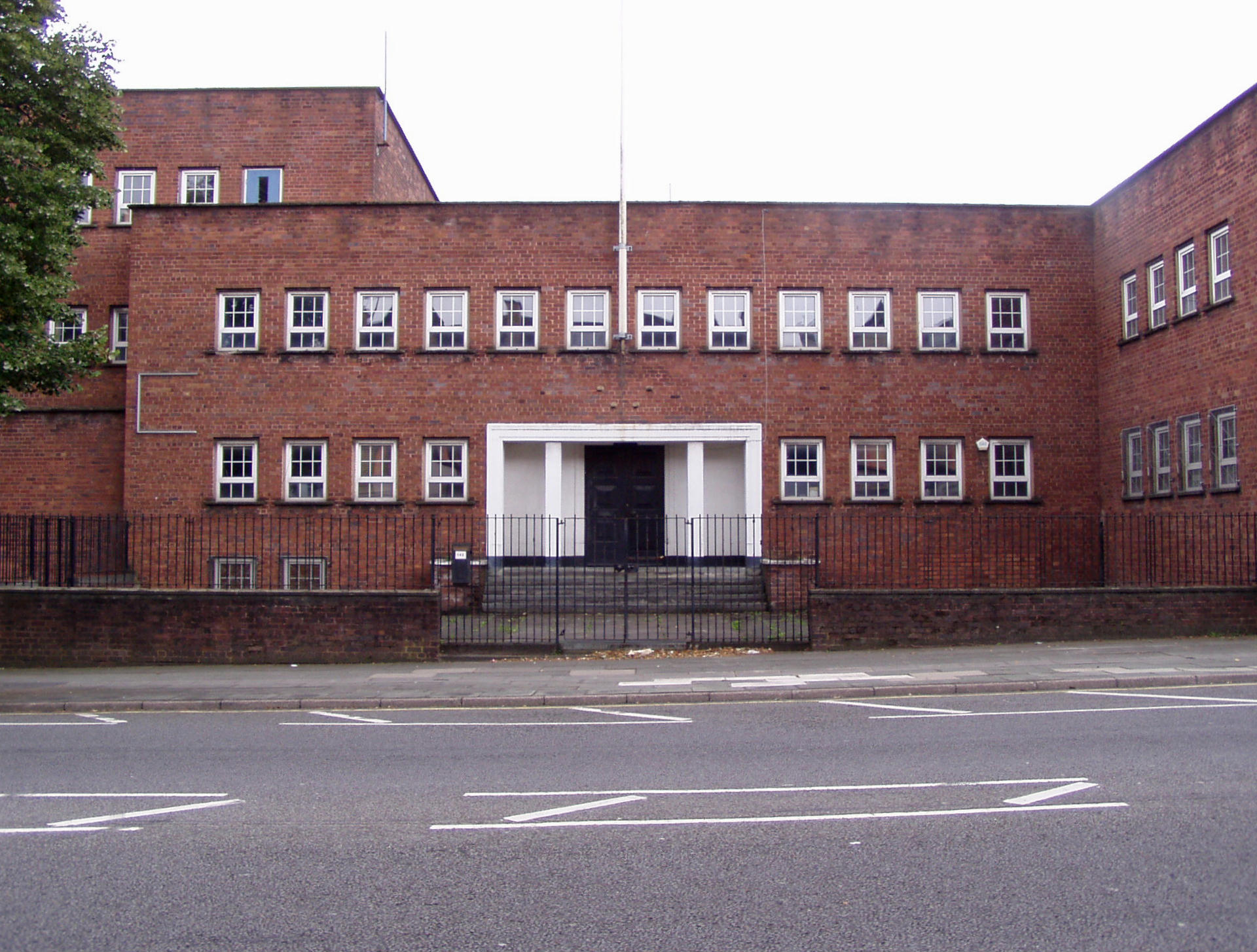
- The Grange

Site information
- Type: Barracks
- Owner: Ministry of Defence
- Operator: British Army

Location
- Location within Merseyside
- Coordinates: 53°24′33″N 02°59′09″W

Site history
- Built: 1900
- Built for: War Office
- In use: 1900-2008

The Grange was a former military installation located in Edge Lane, Liverpool. It was originally an old sandstone farmhouse acquired by the War Office in 1900 for use as the regimental headquarters of an artillery regiment. During World War I, it served as the home to the 349th (4th West Lancashire) Howitzer Brigade, and during World War II, it housed the 59th (4th West Lancashire) Medium Brigade. From 1993 to 1999, The Grange was utilized by the 4th Battalion, Parachute Regiment as well.

After its military service, The Grange transformed into a museum dedicated to the Liverpool Scottish regiment until its closure in 2008.
