= New Mersey Shopping Park =

New Mersey Shopping
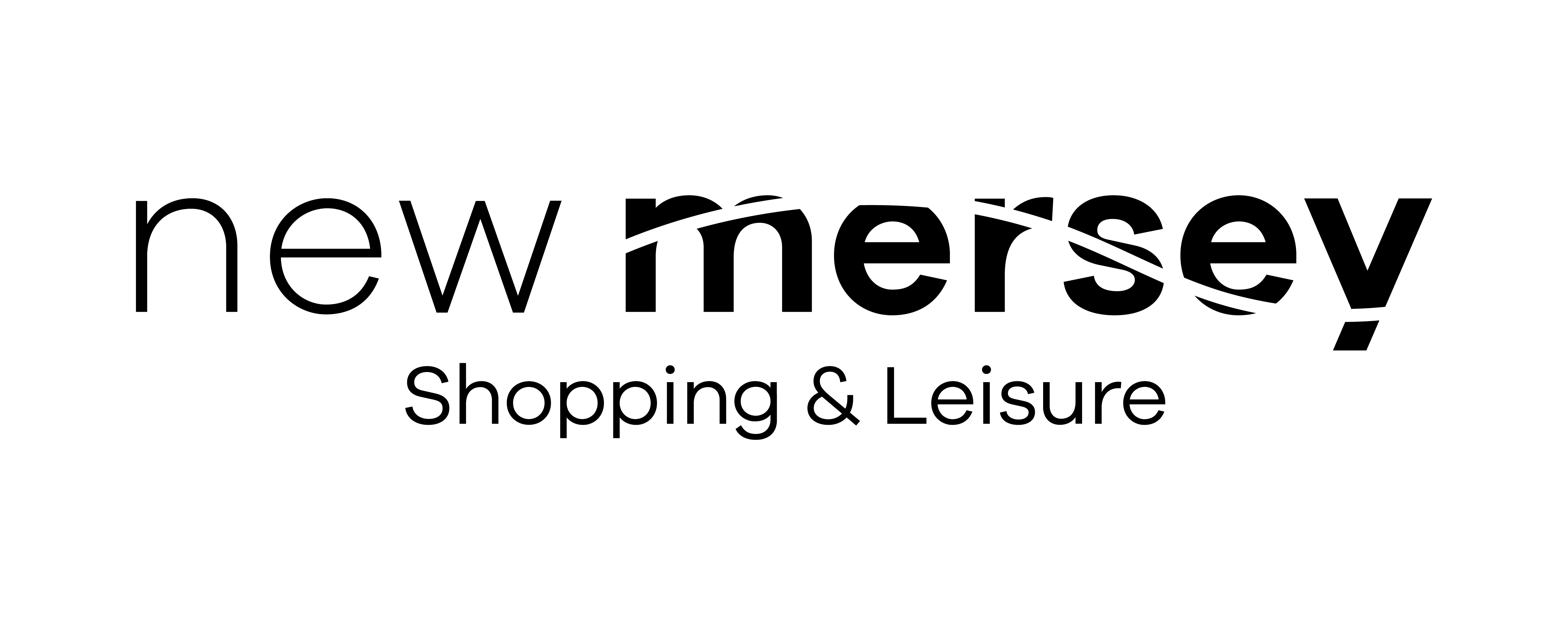
- Location: Liverpool, England
- Coordinates: 53.35087°N 2.87851°W
- Address: New Mersey, Speke Road
- Owner: British Land
- Num. of stores: 37
- Floor area: 436,000 sq ft (40,500 m^{2})
- Floors: 1
- Website: www.newmersey.co.uk

External image
- New Mersey Shopping Park

New Mersey Shopping Park is an out of town retail park located in Speke, Liverpool, England. It opened in 1985.

The park is situated alongside the A561 road near to Liverpool John Lennon Airport 5 miles (8.0 km) south-east of Liverpool city centre. Much of the construction occurred in 1999 to 2000 when the complex was home to thirty-one units and had a combined total gross internal floor area of 472,605 sq ft (43,906.4 m^{2}), New Mersey Park has since seen the construction of several new units to the south of the A561 adjacent to the former Speke Airport terminal building (which is now the Crowne Plaza LJLA Hotel). There are parking spaces for approximately 1,850 vehicles. A leisure area opened in 2018 and features a Cineworld 11-screen cinema, McDonald's, Nando's, Wagamama, JD Wetherspoons, Pizza Express, Five Guys, Hollywood Bowl, Popeyes and Ninja Warrior UK.
