= St Anne's Church, Edge Hill =

Coordinates: 53.4032°N 2.9537°W

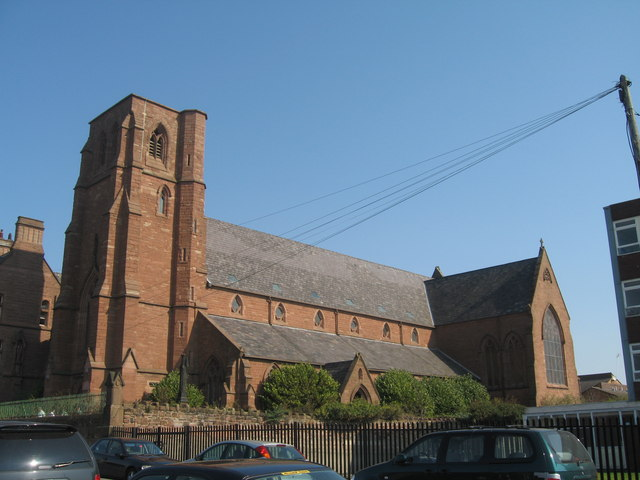
- St Anne's Church, Edge Hill, from the southwest

- Location in Merseyside
- OS grid reference: SJ 367 900
- Location: Overbury Street, Edge Hill, Liverpool, Merseyside
- Country: England
- Denomination: Roman Catholic
- Website: St Anne's, Liverpool

History
- Status: Parish church
- Founder: Downside Abbey

Architecture
- Functional status: Active
- Heritage designation: Grade II
- Designated: 19 June 1985
- Architect(s): Charles Hansom, Pugin and Pugin, Peter Paul Pugin
- Architectural type: Church
- Style: Gothic Revival
- Groundbreaking: 1843
- Completed: 1893

Specifications
- Materials: Sandstone, slate roof

Administration
- Diocese: Archdiocese of Liverpool

Clergy
- Priest: Fr. Peter Morgan

St Anne's Church is in Overbury Street, Edge Hill, Liverpool, Merseyside, England. It is an active Roman Catholic parish church in the Archdiocese of Liverpool. In 1999 its parish was combined with that of the Church of St Bernard. The church is recorded in the National Heritage List for England as a designated Grade II listed building.

== History ==
St Anne's was built between 1843 and 1846, designed by Charles Hansom, and built by the monks of Downside Abbey. It was enlarged in 1888–89 by Pugin and Pugin, who added a chancel, an apse, and two transepts, and in 1893 by Peter Paul Pugin who added a baptistry. At an unknown date its care passed from the monks of Downside Abbey to those of Ampleforth Abbey, and in 1950 the church became part of the Archdiocese of Liverpool. In 1969 the interior of the church was reordered, with the removal of the baldacchino and altar rails, and the installation of an altar.

== Architecture ==
=== Exterior ===
The church is built in red sandstone, and has a slate roof. Its style is early Decorated. The plan consists of a six-bay nave with a clerestory, north and south aisles with lean-to roofs, north and south transepts, an apsidal three-bay chancel, and a west tower. The tower is supported by angle buttresses, and has an octagonal stair turret on the southeast corner. It has a west entrance with four orders, above which is a four-light window and a canopied niche. The bell stage contains pairs of two-light louvred bell openings. Pollard and Pevsner comment that the tower is prominent, but that it looks as though it is "sliced"; this is because the intended spire was not built from fear of subsidence. The aisles have two-light windows along the sides, and three-light windows at the west ends. The clerestory contains quatrefoils under pointed arches. In the transepts are two-light west windows, and five-light north and south windows. The windows contain geometric tracery.

=== Interior ===
Inside the church, the arcades are carried on quatrefoil columns. Between the chancel and the chapels on one side, and the organ loft on the other side, the arcades are carried on a double row of columns. Around the apse is an arcade containing lancet windows. In the church is a three-manual pipe organ built originally by Henry Willis and Sons and Lewis and Company. This was rebuilt and modernised in 1958, again by Willis and Sons.

== Associated features ==
In the churchyard is a stone memorial to two members of the Linford family who died, respectively, in 1849 and 1855. It was designed by A. Murphy, and consists of an octagonal pillar standing on a plinth. It contains a niche under a canopy, and at the top are two sculpted figures, considered to be the Virgin Mary and St John. It is listed at Grade II. Attached to the northwest of the church is a large presbytery, built in 1893 and designed by Peter Paul Pugin. This is also listed at Grade II.

== See also ==
- Grade II listed buildings in Liverpool-L7
