= Wavertree Botanic Garden and Park =

Botanical garden in Liverpool, England

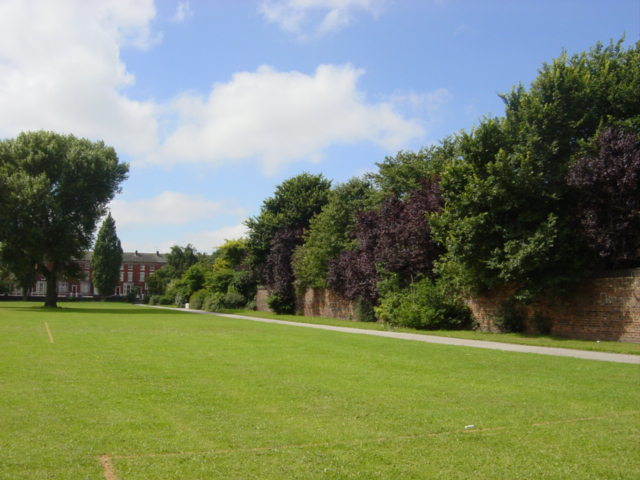
- Interactive map of Wavertree Botanic Garden and Park
- Type: Public
- Location: Wavertree, Liverpool
- Coordinates: 53.406°N 2.942°W
- Area: 14.6 hectares (36 acres)
- Created: 1846
- Operator: Liverpool City Council
- Status: Open all year

Wavertree Botanic Garden and Park is a mid-19th century public park in Liverpool, England. Originally constructed as a private botanic garden, it was taken over by Liverpool Corporation in 1846 and expanded into a public park.

The park is Grade II* listed in the Register of Historic Parks and Gardens.

== History ==
The Wavertree Botanic Garden was first opened in 1836, occupying a 4.5-hectare (11-acre) plot just south of Edge Lane. This spot was chosen as the site for the relocation of the original Liverpool Botanic Garden, which had been established near Mount Pleasant in 1802 by William Roscoe and other local botanists. The move had become necessary as the rapidly expanding city was encroaching on the borders of the Mount Pleasant garden; many of the plants from this garden, including mature trees, were transported by horse and cart to the new site in Wavertree. The design of the new garden was the work of its curator, John Shepherd, who died shortly after its formal opening.

The botanic garden was a private society, funded by the sale of shares to its members (following the same model as the Liverpool Athenaeum). However, subscriber numbers soon began to decline, and the proprietors struggled to pay the running costs. In 1840, Liverpool Corporation gave financial assistance to the garden by paying off a £3,800 debt; in return, it was agreed that the garden would be opened to the public for two days a week. In 1846, the corporation bought out the proprietors and took full control of the garden, allowing public access seven days a week, with access to the conservatory granted for one day out of every month.

In 1856, the land to the south of the garden – formerly the grounds of Wavertree Hall, or Plumbe's Hall – was laid out as Wavertree park. This land had been purchased by the corporation in 1843 for use as the site of a prison, but following local protests, the prison had been built in Walton instead. Wavertree Park was expanded over subsequent decades, with more land being acquired to the west and east of the garden. The park and garden together currently occupy an area of around 14.6 hectares.

The International Exhibition of Navigation, Commerce and Industry was held in 1886 on a site directly alongside the park. The Exhibition was opened by Queen Victoria, and several temporary pavilions were erected for the occasion, along with a full-scale replica of the Eddystone Lighthouse.

Throughout the late 19th and early 20th centuries, the Botanic Garden was in a state of deterioration. In 1909, thousands of plant specimens were transferred to the newly established botany department at Liverpool Museum. On 20 November 1940, the conservatory was destroyed by a German bomb intended for the nearby railway marshalling yard at Edge Hill; the surviving plants were relocated to privately owned glasshouses. This conservatory was never rebuilt, and in 1951, work began on a new botanic garden in Calderstones Park.

The Wavertree Botanic Garden and Park remains open to the public. On 27 June 2001, it was listed at Grade II* in the Register of Historic Parks and Gardens.

== Features ==
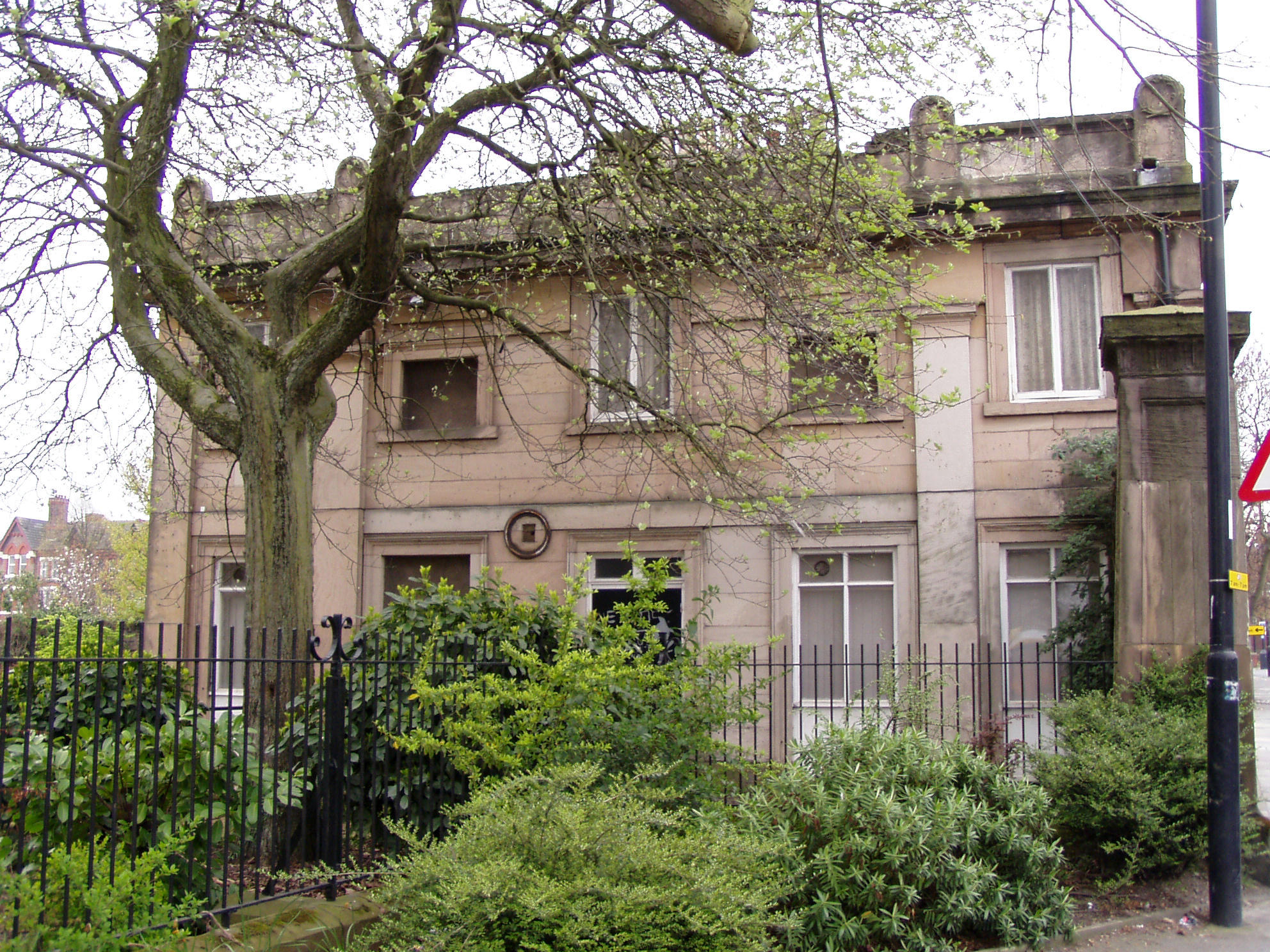
Curator's lodge

One of the few surviving features of the original Botanic Garden is the curator's lodge, built in 1836. This Grade II listed building has been used since September 2013 as the Botanic Lodge Nursery for children, retaining some of its original features. The geometric flowerbeds also survive in something close to their original state, although currently untended. These beds, laid out in a scroll design inspired by the tiles of St. George's Hall, were raised in 1863 by curator John Tyerman. The garden formerly contained two ponds with fountains, but these have since been converted into planting beds. Two statues depicting Tam O'Shanter and Souter Johnnie, characters from the Robert Burns' poem "Tam o' Shanter", were only partially intact in 2001, and had been removed by 2013.

The surrounding park is now mostly used for playing fields; a sports pavilion and a children's playground have been built near the southwest entrance. Close to the centre of the southern section lie the remains of a 19th-century cast-iron drinking fountain, which was Grade II listed in 1975. The basins of this fountain were originally supported by ornamental liver birds, of which only the feet can now be seen.

An underground tunnel running beneath the park was used during World War II as an air raid shelter for workers at the nearby Littlewoods Pools building. Graffiti artworks on the walls of the tunnel are thought to be wartime portraits of some of these workers.
