= Pugin =

Pugin most commonly refers to Augustus Welby Northmore Pugin (1812–1852), an English architect and designer.

Members of his family include:

- Augustus Charles Pugin (1768/9–1832), his French-born father, an artist and architectural draughtsman
- E. W. Pugin (1834–1875), his eldest son, also an architect
- Cuthbert Welby Pugin (1840–1928), also an architect, furniture builder and businessman
- Peter Paul Pugin (1851–1904), his youngest son, also an architect

Other, unrelated people who share the Pugin surname include:

- Aleksei Pugin (born 1987), Russian football player
- Jacques Pugin (born 1954), Swiss artist-photographer
- Vitali Pugin (born 1978), retired Russian professional football player

== See also ==
- Pugin & Pugin, the Pugin family's architectural firm
- Pugin, another transliteration of the name for the Northerners (Korean political faction) during the Joseon dynasty
