= Light Painting World Alliance =

Organisation for light painting photographers

Light Painting World Alliance (LPWA) was a nonprofit organization (NPO). Its goal was to offer the light painting community a cross-border platform to show its art, to set up networks, and to promote social concerns and further training by means of light painting.

For this purpose LPWA established a network of local representatives from currently 30 countries worldwide. It was founded in December 2011 by Russian artist Sergey B. Churkin. LPWA showcases light painting works of its members in the context of exhibitions, conferences and special events using an advisory board of lightpainters for selection.

In September 2014 LPWA was awarded status as an official Collaborating Partner of the International Year of Light and Light-based Technologies 2015 (IYL2015) by UNESCO. This happened in accordance with the proclaimed International Year of Light and Light-based Technologies 2015 by UNESCO. As representatives of LPWA artists Sergey Churkin, Eric Mellinger, Hugo Baptista and JanLeonardo were officially invited to attend opening ceremonies at UNESCO Headquarters Paris.

== Selected events and exhibitions ==
- 2012: Central House of Artists Moscow - 1st Light Painting World Exhibition
- 2013: LPWA Mumbai 2013 International Light Painting Show
- 2013: G8 Gallery Moscow) - Positive In My Mind
- 2013: Espace Pierre Cardin Paris - 2nd Light Painting World Exhibition
- 2014: World Light Painting Mega Animation Project
- 2014: Oviedo - 1st International LightArt Congress & 3rd World Light Painting Exhibition
- 2014: Embarcadère Culture Center Aubervilliers - Special Event
- 2014: New Town Plaza Hong Kong - Waves of Shining Light Special Event
- 2014: LPWA Contest -Light Painted World
- 2015: Madrid - THE BODY ART WEEKEND Special Event
- 2015: UNESCO Paris - Light Painted World Exhibition
