= Party bike =

Vehicle powered by multiple people pedaling

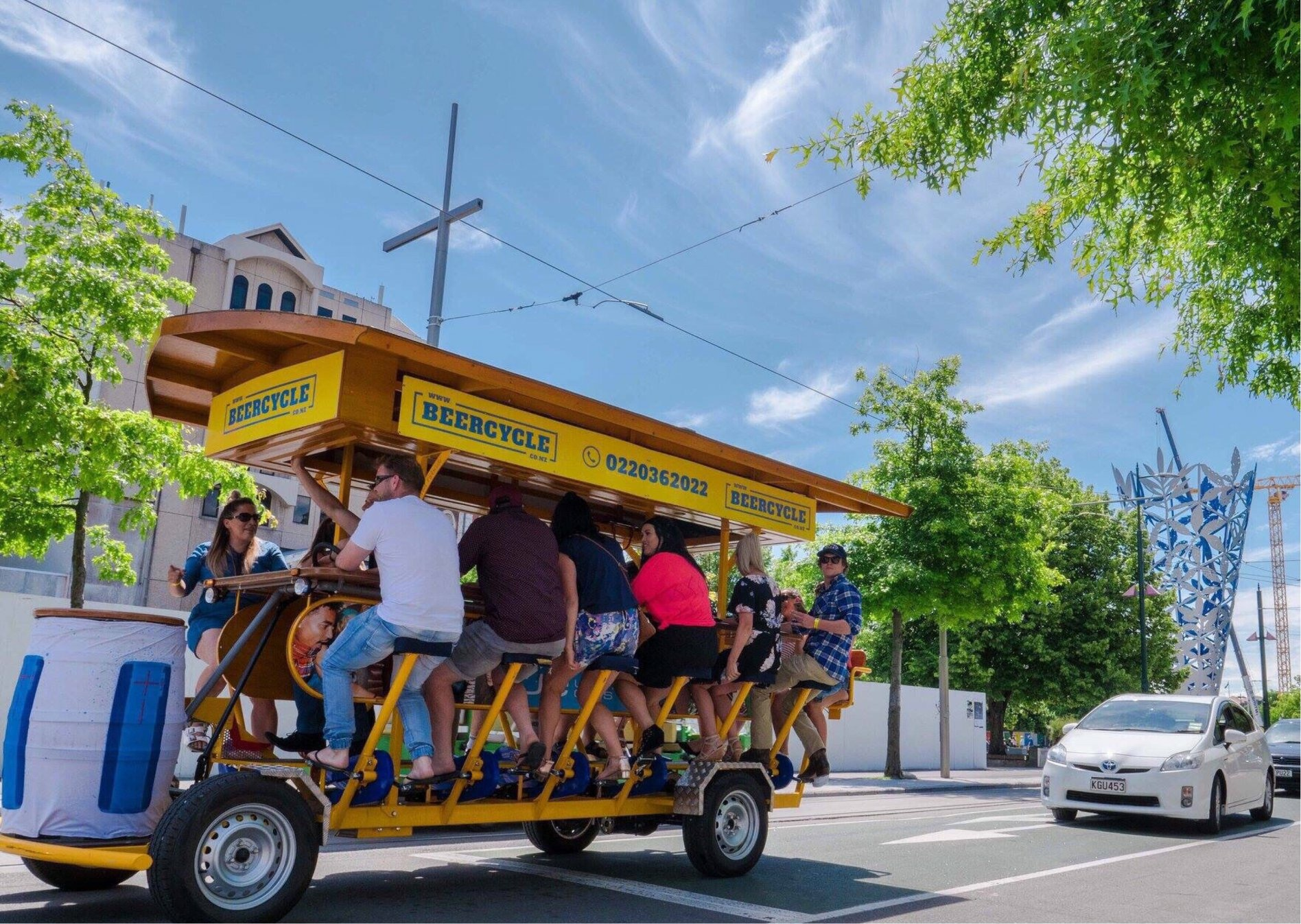
A party bike in Christchurch, New Zealand

A party bike, conference bike, pedal pub, fietscafé, bierfiets, beer bike or bar bike is a multi-passenger human powered vehicle that is powered by the passengers. Human-powered party bikes have grown into several families of vehicles for a variety of purposes, including tourist rentals and private touring.

== Party bike ==
A party bike was invented in 1997 by Het Fietscafe BV from the Netherlands. A party bike is sometimes mistaken for a larger-scale version of a pedicab (cycle rickshaw), but it is not, since the party bike is powered by the passengers, while the steering and braking is controlled by a driver who does not provide pedaling power. Some also double as rolling refreshment stands. Party bikes are often used for staff parties and bachelor or bachelorette parties. They are often available at tourist attractions where they are rented by the hour or day. When used in conjunction with alcohol, a party bike usually is hired with a driver.

=== Construction ===
A modern tourist party bike usually features open seating for eight or more riders in a sociable configuration. These vehicles are often designed to look like early 20th century trolley cars and have side seating for the pedalers, a bench seat in the rear, rack-and-pinion steering, and a canopy top. A few manufacturers offer an electric assist motor to aid the riders on hilly terrain. Modern party bikes are typically 5–6 m (15–20 ft) long, 2 m (7 ft) wide and 2.4 m (8 ft) tall, making them similar in size to a large car. Because they are driven on municipal streets, some have headlights, tail lights, and turn signals.

=== Serving beer ===
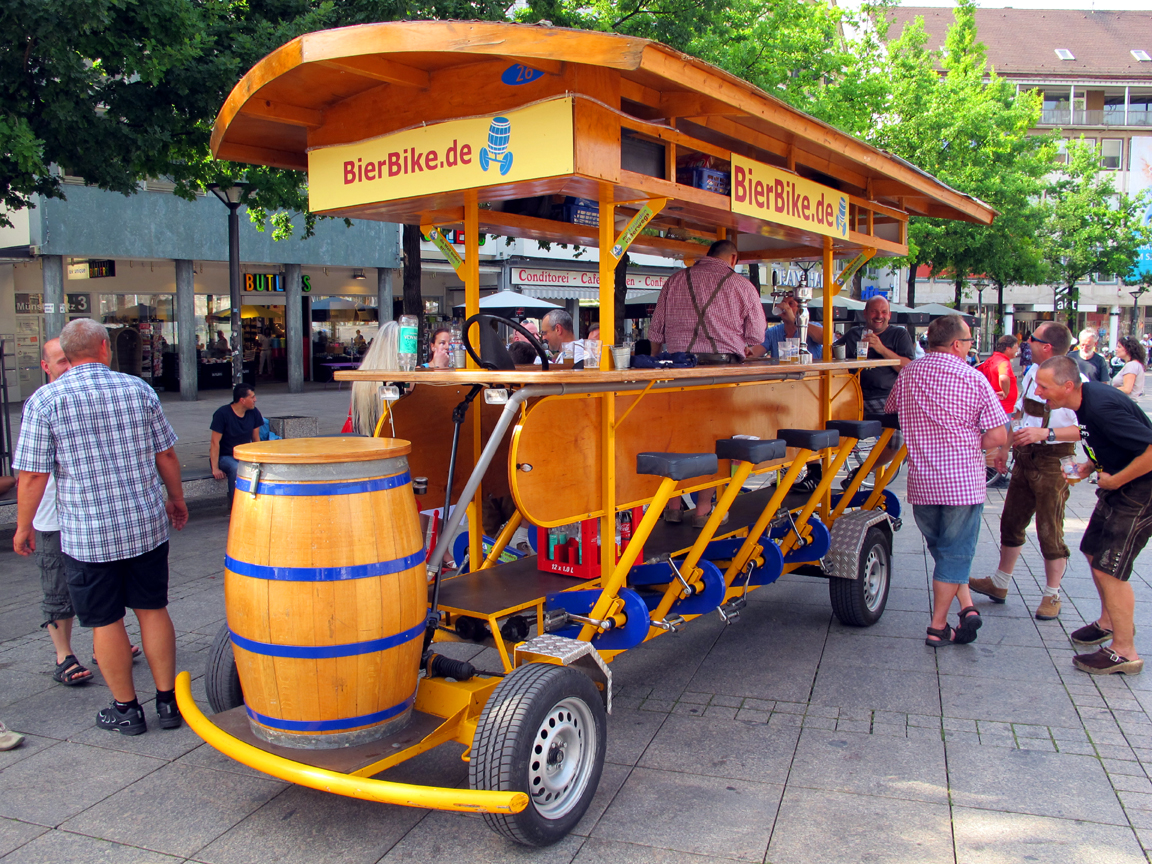
A party bike serving beer in Ulm, Germany

These pedal pubs-on-wheels have become popular in the United States, as well as the Netherlands, Belgium, Germany and France. Some party bikes can have up to 16 cycling passengers, three non-cycling passengers, bar tenders and a driver. In many European municipalities, it is legal to consume alcohol while pedaling or riding on the party bike, provided the driver is not imbibing. However, strict state-based open container laws in the United States prevent most party bike passengers from consuming alcohol while on board except in certain municipalities. In some locations, the driver is required to have a chauffeur's driver's license to operate on public streets. Generally, a company or individual will own the party bike and rent it out to the public for tours. The party bike is often associated with microbrewery tourism. It can be seen used by corporations for team building and retreat activities, groups such as wedding parties, birthday parties, coffee drinkers, exercise groups, and sightseers.

=== Bans ===
Problems with noise and traffic jams led to a ban on beer bikes in the centre of Amsterdam from the end of 2017.

=== Accidents and incidents ===
On August 15, 2013, in downtown Minneapolis, a full party bike operated by a large beer bike company tipped onto its right side. Two of the riders were taken to the hospital by ambulance. A police spokesperson stated that "Alcohol does not appear to be a factor." Earlier in the year, the city had entertained introducing new regulations and licensing for party bikes.

== Conference bike ==
The ConferenceBike is a 7-seat human powered vehicle created by artist Eric Staller and manufactured in The Netherlands. One person steers and all may pedal. The bike has a circular jointed drive-shaft and rack & pinion steering. In most countries, it has the same legal status as a bicycle. There are now over 300 ConferenceBikes in 18 countries.

=== Purpose ===
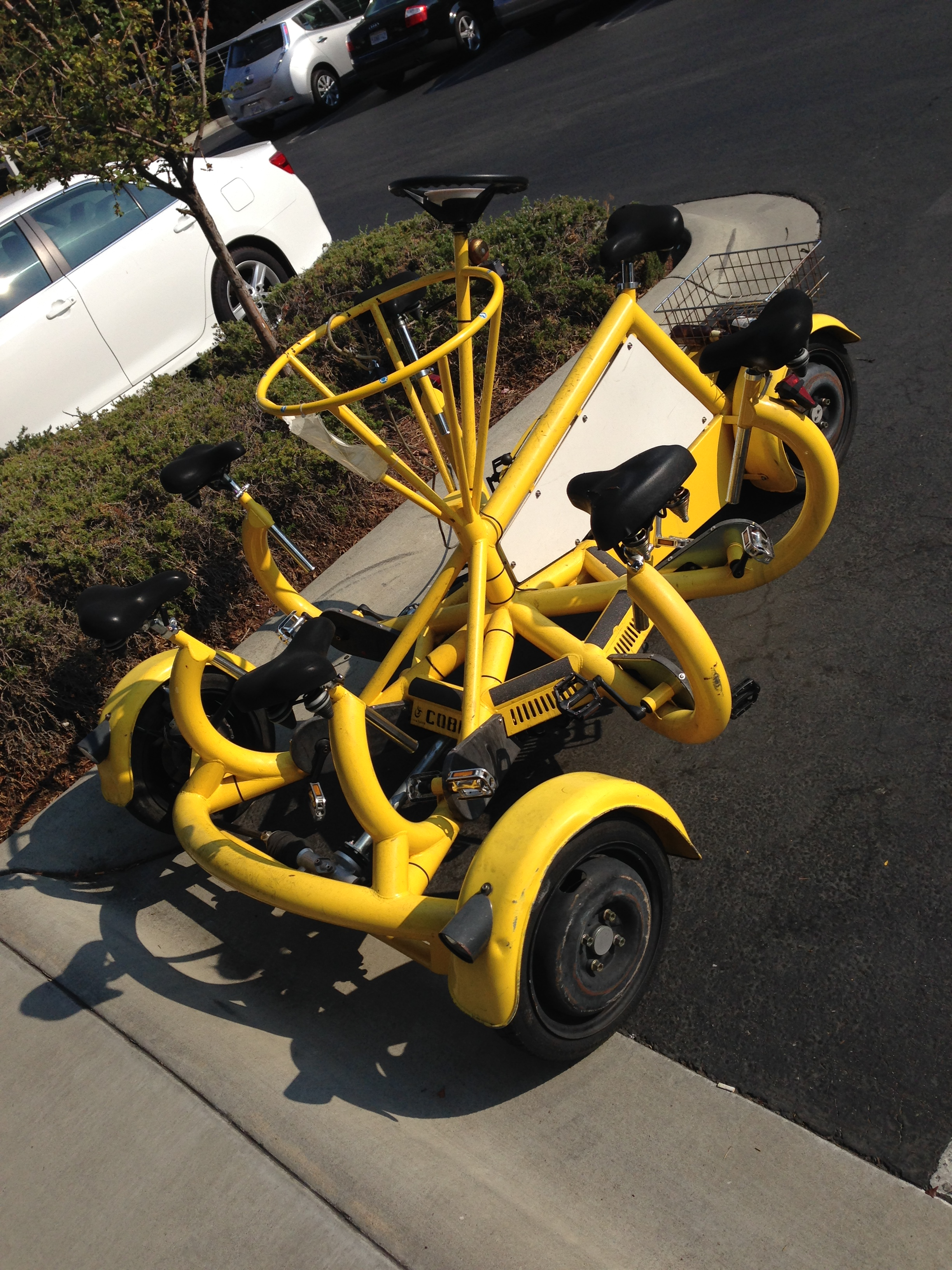
Conference Bike at the Googleplex

The ConferenceBike is used primarily for tourism, and used as a team building tool at corporations and university campuses. Google Inc. has nine bikes in use for transportation and team building on their campus.

The Washington, D.C. Veterans Health Administration Medical Center has a ConferenceBike that was donated by Eric Staller's father. It is used by employees and veterans for recreational and fundraising events.

=== Specifications ===
- Length: 2.50 m (8 ft 2 in)
- Width: 1.80 m (5 ft 11 in)
- Weight: 220 kg (490 lb)

== See also ==
- Outline of cycling
