= Eric Staller =

American artist (born 1947)

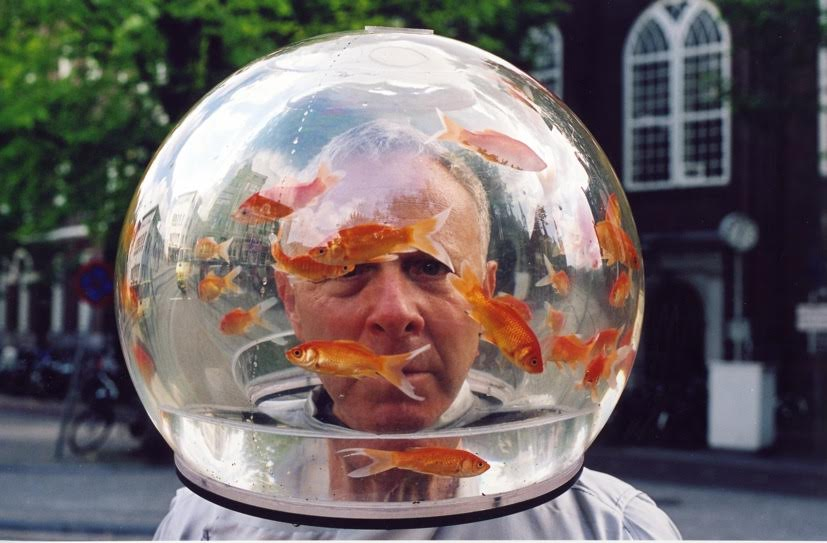
- Born: September 14, 1947 (age 78); Mineola, New York
- Education: University of Michigan
- Known for: Mixed media art

Eric Staller (born September 14, 1947) is an American artist. He uses light and architecture as a medium to create and design works of art.

== Biography ==
Staller was born in 1947 in Mineola, New York; he is the oldest of five children. His father is a real estate developer and his mother a homemaker. His father's avocation had been architecture, which inspired Staller to study architecture himself.

In 1971, Staller completed a bachelor's degree in architecture at the University of Michigan. Toward the end of his tenure at the University of Michigan, Staller began to create sculptures and performance arts. Merce Cunningham and John Cage had performed at the university at that time and praised artwork that Staller had created. They were the first professional performers to make Staller realize that he was truly an artist. In the fall of 1971, Staller moved to New York City and lived there until 1991. He had purchased an 1829-vingtage Lutheran Church, located in Lyons, PA. Staller used and renovated the church as a weekend retreat until 1991, then decided to move out of New York to live full-time in Lyons, PA.

Staller had wanted to live in Europe after he had visited Amsterdam in 1988 to show his work at an opening of a gallery show. In September 1994 with his wife and son, Staller moved to Amsterdam. Soon after that Staller went through some personal changes with his family and focused on his work as an artist.

In January 1999, at the Schiphol Airport, he had met and then soon after married a Dutch filmmaker, Sietske Tjallingii. Staller lived in Amsterdam for fifteen years before moving back to the United States to the city of San Francisco in 2010. Staller's Dutch filmmaker wife Sietske is producing a film using roadside attractions as backdrops. She will be traveling around the United States to these roadside locations.

== Career ==
=== 1970s ===
Staller was invited by the director of the graduate painting department at the Maryland Institute College of Art several times in the 1970s to lecture about his work, as well as to give student critiques. In the winter of 1978, he put his abilities to work to light up the Fox Building as it was in the process of being converted from a factory into a classroom building. With the help of students, he filled all the windows with timer-activated lights, which lit up the entire building. The following year he was artist-in-residence in the undergraduate sculpture department at MICA.

By the late 1970s Staller was called "The Light Master" where he made a name for himself using sparklers and other means of light to outline the streets of New York City. He used long-exposures to photos, creating the illusions of light art, which can also be called light painting.

=== 1980s ===
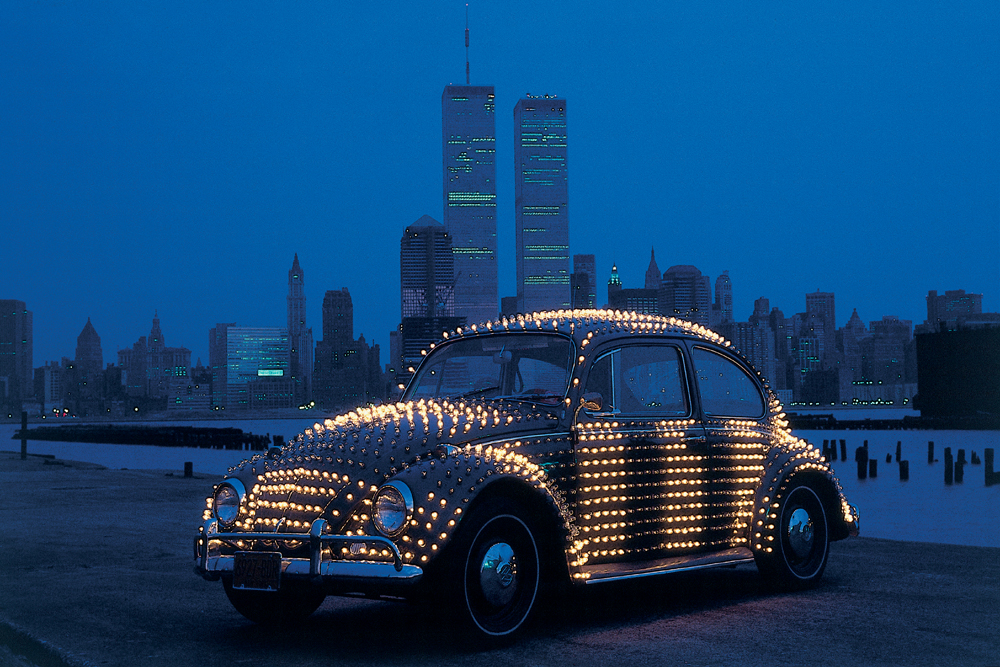
Volkswagen Lightmobile

Staller is best known for his Volkswagen Lightmobile, a 1967 Volkswagen Beetle covered with 1659 computerized light bulbs. It was completed in March 1985, 5 months after the project began. This work of art is well known and has traveled around the world.

The Volkswagen Lightmobile also appeared in the movie The Money Pit (1986). He has titled his mobile public artwork "urban UFO's".

He has been one of the pioneers of art movements, such as Performance Arts, Light Painting and Art Cars, as well as the inventor of the Conference Bike, which is a seven-seat human-powered vehicle. The trade name is the ConferenceBike which was developed in the late 1980s. There are more than 250 ConferenceBikes in 16 countries. The ConferenceBike has become a powerful symbol and tool for bringing people together.

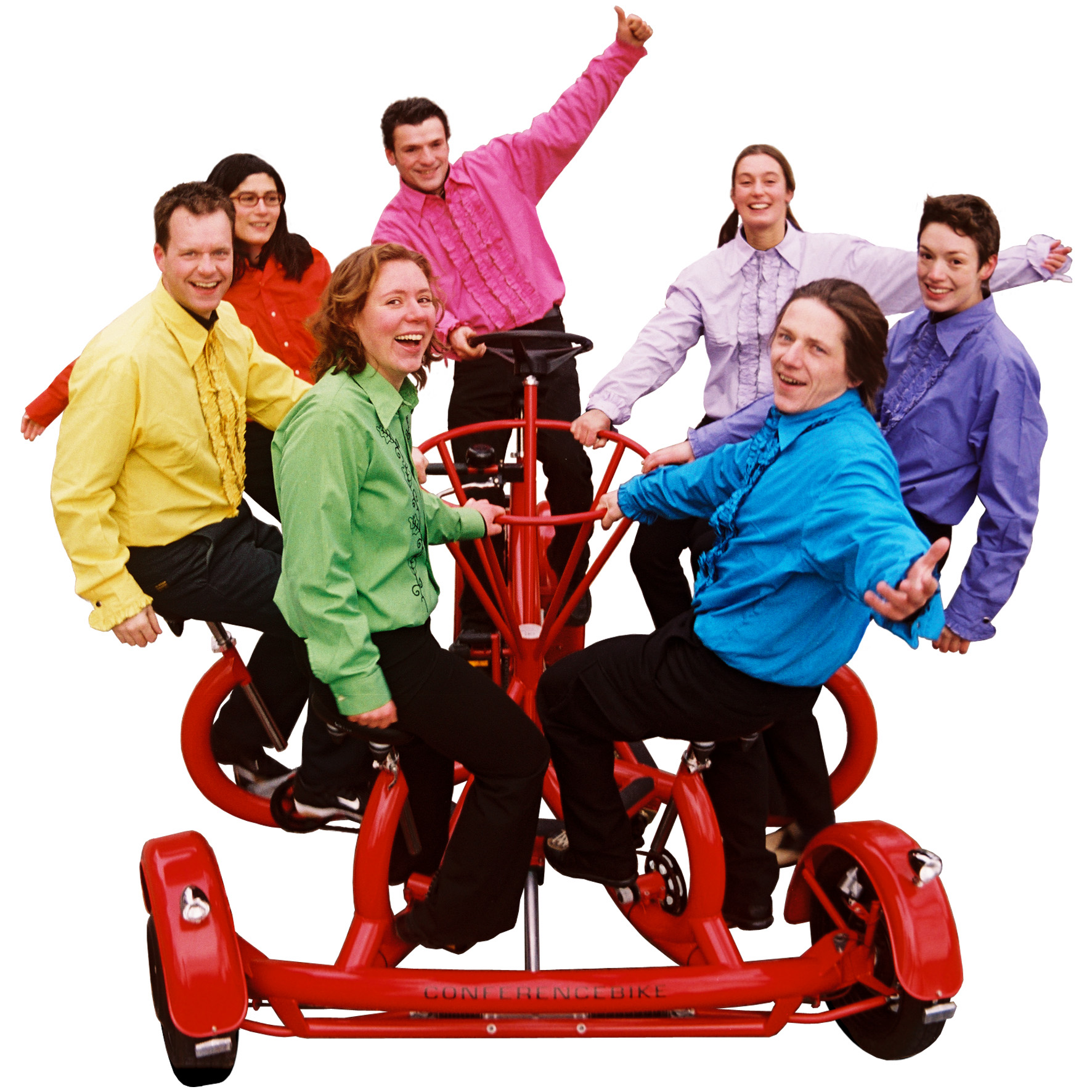
ConferenceBike

=== 1990s ===
A book written by Staller, Out of my Mind is an autobiographical illustrated novel with more than 150 color photos of his work and life experiences. He was moved by the 9/11 terrorist attacks in a way that he felt a need to write this book. He had written "9/11 shook loose in me a need to write this memoir. I wanted to give the reader an intimate look at my creative process; to show how my life and loves, my places and times, have been inseparable from my 35 years of art making. Take my book to bed!"

He was also one of the many artists that made a submission to the World Trade Center Site, Memorial Competition. His design was silhouettes of the falling, with waterfalls flowing all around them.

=== Commissioned work ===
In 1990 Eric and Deborah Staller (his wife at the time) in collaboration with Paul Degen, Enno Wiersma and Mundy Hepburn exhibited the Magic Garden at Twin 21 Plaza, Osaka, the second largest city in Japan. Many tourists and the people of Osaka enjoyed the exhibition. This collaboration was commissioned work by Matsushita Investment and Development Co.

== Mr Lonely and Urban UFO Creations ==
Staller has said that "Mr Lonely is a quiet and subtle reminder of what ultimately awaits us all". Mr Lonely is a skeleton in the water that tips his hat to all that pass by. Mr Lonely and the Remote Controlled Lovers have been seen in the canals of Amsterdam for many years. The Remote Controlled Lovers have two ceramic heads, spaced 60 cm (24") apart and are attached to a radio-controlled submarine. The Lovers gently dance in the canal in circles and s-curves, mesmerizing people as they walk by.
