= Light writing =

Stop motion animation

Surveilluminescence Illustrating the concept of long-exposure photography to make surveillance camera's sight field, and camera phone's sightfield (two intersecting time-reversed lightfields) visible

Spaceglasses Illustrating the concept of abakography: long-exposure photography as a 3D gesture-based user-interface within the augmented reality environment of the Meta Spaceglasses

Light writing is a form of stop motion animation wherein still images captured using the technique known as light painting or light drawing are put in sequence thereby creating the optical illusion of movement for the viewer.

== Technique ==
By sequencing stills taken with 4–30 second exposure as lights are moved in and through the frame this effect creates the optical illusion that the light is moving. Pans, tilts, and most other motion camera techniques can be applied with standard stop motion approaches. The most common technique is to capture multiple second exposures of light moving from one point to another in the frame. As the sequence is built the beginning and ending points of the lights motion can be moved along a given path. When the pictures are put in sequence the light seems to move with classic stop motion. Most commonly, all of the work is done in camera at practical (real world, not a studio) locations. The stills can be taken with a digital camera or film camera.

Light writing is most akin to another form of stop motion animation known as direct manipulation animation. The technique is also reminiscent of the slitscan process already used in the 1960s.

== Recent history ==
Though the technique was employed almost one hundred years ago by Pablo Picasso it has only recently been used for mainstream advertisements. Awareness of light writing was raised when Sprint Nextel unveiled an ad campaign featuring the effect in the summer of 2007.

== See also ==
- Persistence of vision, a phenomenon that retains light in the retina.
- Beta movement, the reason we perceive images in quick succession as smooth motion
- Phi phenomenon, another form of apparent motion
