= Light painting =

Photographic art created by tracing light sources during long exposures

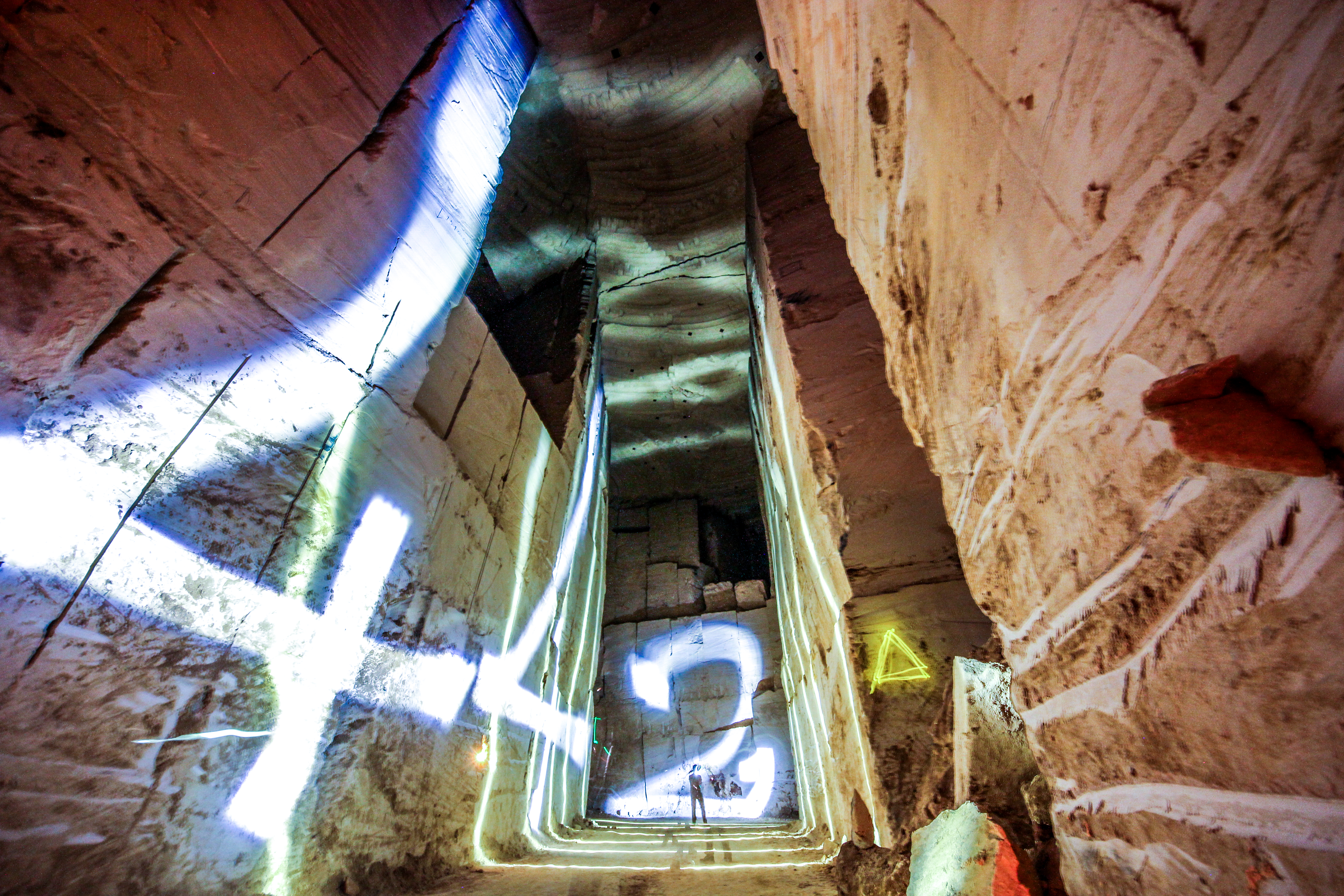
Light painting inside an abandoned limestone quarry in France

Light painting, painting with light, light drawing, light art performance photography, or sometimes also freezelight are terms that describe photographic techniques of moving a light source while taking a long-exposure photograph, either to illuminate a subject or space, or to shine light at the camera to 'draw', or by moving the camera itself during exposure of light sources. Practiced since the 1880s, the technique is used for both scientific and artistic purposes, as well as in commercial photography.

Light painting also refers to a technique of image creation using light directly, such as with LEDs on a projective surface using the approach that a painter approaches a canvas.

== History ==
Light painting dates back to 1889 when Étienne-Jules Marey and Georges Demeny traced human motion in the first known light painting Pathological Walk From in Front.

The technique was used in Frank Gilbreth's work with his wife Lillian Moller Gilbreth in 1914 when the pair used small lights and the open shutter of a camera to track the motion of manufacturing and clerical workers.

Man Ray, in his 1935 series "Space Writing," was the first known art photographer to use the technique. He made a self-portrait with a time exposure and while the shutter was open, with a penlight he inscribed his name in cursive script in the space between him and the camera, overwriting the letters with more cryptic marks. Historian of photography Ellen Carey (*1952) describes her discovery of the artist's signature in this image while examining it in 2009.

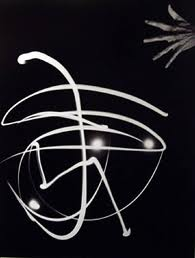
Pure Energy and Neurotic Man, a light painting by Barbara Morgan (1940)

Photographer Barbara Morgan began making light paintings in 1935–1941. Her 1941 photomontage Pure Energy and Neurotic Man incorporates light drawing and realises her stated aim; "that if I should ever seriously photograph, it would be...the flux of things. I wanted then, and still do, to express the ‘thing’ as part of total flow." In making innovative photographs of dancers, including Martha Graham and Erick Hawkins she would have them move while holding lights.

In 1949 Pablo Picasso was visited by Gjon Mili, a photographer and lighting innovator, who introduced Picasso to his photographs of ice skaters with lights attached to their skates. Immediately Picasso started making images in the air with a small flashlight in a dark room. This series of photos became known as Picasso's "light drawings." Of these photos, the most celebrated and famous is known as Picasso draws a Centaur.

Peter Keetman (1916–2005), who studied photography in Munich from 1935 to 1937, was the 1949 co-founder of FotoForm (together with Otto Steinert, Toni Schneiders et al.), a group with great impact on the new photography in the 50s and 60s in Germany and abroad. He produced a series Schwingungsfigur (oscillating figures) of complex linear meshes, often with moiré effects, using a point-source light on a pendulum.

During the 1970s and '80s Eric Staller used this technology for numerous photo projects that were called "Light Drawings". Light paintings up to 1976 are classified as light drawings.

In 1977 Dean Chamberlain extended the technique using handheld lights to selectively illuminate and/or color parts of the subject or scene with his image Polyethylene Bags On Chaise Longue at the Rochester Institute of Technology. Dean Chamberlain was the first artist to dedicate his entire body of work to the light painting art form. The photographer Jacques Pugin made several series of images with the light drawing technique in 1979. Now, with modern light painting, one uses more frequently choreography and performance to photograph and organize.

Photographs of a representation of an electromagnetic radio wave with S.W.I.M. (Sequential Wave Imprinting Machine), which represents traveling waves in stationary spacetime coordinates (i.e. as a "sitting wave")

In the 1970s and early 1980s, Steve Mann invented, designed, built, and used various wearable computers to visualize real-world phenomena such as sound waves, radio waves, and sight fields by light painting using computational photography.

Since the 1980s, Vicki DaSilva has been working exclusively in light painting and light graffiti. In 1980, DaSilva started making deliberate text light graffiti works, the first being "Cash". She continued these light graffiti photographs throughout the 1980s and eventually started using 4 foot fluorescent bulbs hooked up to pulley systems to create sheets of light. In the early 2000s she began making work with 8 foot fluorescent lamps, holding the lamp vertically and walking through spaces with it.

From the late 1980s Tokihiro Satō's photographs combine light, time and space in recording his movements in a series beginning with his “photo respirations” where his use of an 8 x 10-inch view camera fitted with a strong neutral-density filter to achieve lengthy exposures lasting one to three hours provide the opportunity for him to move through the landscape. When shooting in daylight, using a mirror, he flashed light from the sun into the camera lens, resulting in points of light and flares that punctuate the image and track his movements, though his presence is not seen directly. For nocturnal or interior views he “draws” with a small torch.

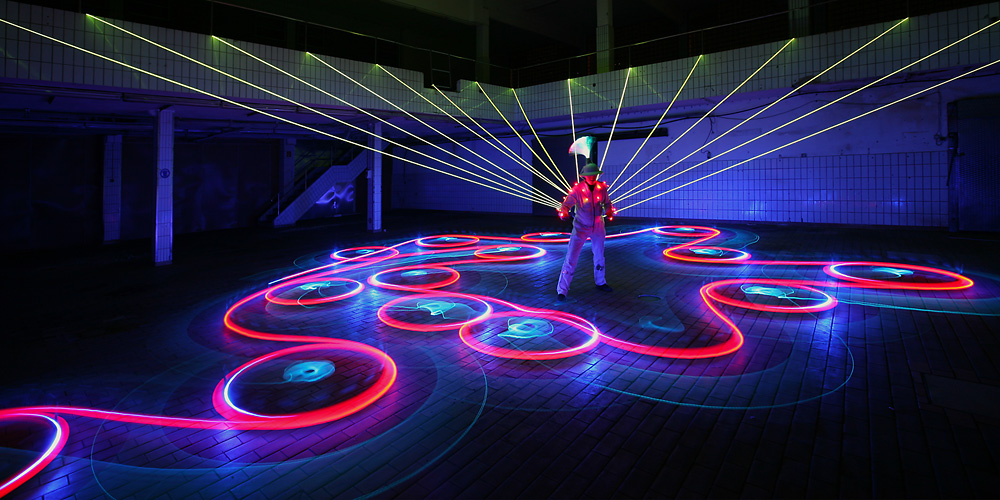
Light art performance photography: Natural Breakdancer

Light painting as an art form enjoyed a surge in popularity in the 21st century, partly due to the increasing availability of dSLR cameras and mobile phone cameras enabling immediate feedback for adjustments of lights and exposure; advances in portable light sources such as LEDs; and the advent of media sharing websites by which practitioners can exchange images and ideas.

In March 2007, JanLeonardo coined the term light art performance photography (LAPP) which emphasises the performative aspect that is evident earlier in Satō's work, and used it to describe the creation of new figures and structures only with light. Following the original Greek meaning of Photography (Greek φῶς, phos, genitive: φωτός, photos, "light" (of the luminary), "brightness" and γράφειν, graphein, "drawing", "carve", "create", "write") it is a symbiosis of light art and photography. The main difference from other light painting or light writing, it has been claimed, is the role of the background in the photo. Locations in the natural landscape or amongst buildings, such as industrial ruins, are carefully researched for distinctive backgrounds for each composition and LED-lamps are often used for contrasting cold and warm light to emphasize the existing structures. Collaboration is usually required in the performance of the work, with one person creating light figures and structures while the other operates the camera. In collaboration with Jörg Miedza, JanLeonardo founded the project LAPP-PRO.de that further developed the technique until in 2011, the pair disassociated. LAPP has grown internationally since its inception.

In 2012, Reid Godshaw created an artistic identity known as "Harmonic Light", creating portraits of people around the world at events and festivals, asking questions to get in tune with subjects' personalities, intentions and motivations to change the world. The work combines many self-taught methods of creating imagery using lasers, custom made LED POV brushes and wands, power drills, handheld RGB flashlights, fiber optics, and even lasers to create a meaningful connection of time and space that embodies how people feel. Godshaw has created imagery at many events around the world including The Grammys in 2019 and over 100 festivals.

== Techniques ==
Light painting using handheld lights to selectively illuminate or colour parts of the subject or scene or to evenly light large architectural interiors has been used in professional photography since the 1930s as described by Leslie Walker and Ansel Adams. Light painting requires a slow shutter speed, usually at least a second in duration. Light painting can imitate characteristics of traditional painting; superimposition and transparency can easily be achieved by moving, adding or removing lights or subjects during or between exposures.

Projector light painting, by waving a white translucent flash diffuser in the light path of a portable projector, the continuous motion creates an invisible screen in the air for the projected image in the photo.

Light paintings can be created using a webcam. The painted image can already be seen while drawing by using a monitor or projector. Another technique is the projection of images on to irregular surfaces (such as faces or buildings), in effect "painting" them with light. A photograph or other fixed portrayal of the resulting image is then made.

Kinetic light painting is achieved by moving the camera and is the antithesis of traditional photography. At night, or in a dark room, the camera can be removed from the tripod and used like a paintbrush. For example, using the night sky as the canvas, the camera as the brush and artificially-lit cityscapes as the palette. Putting energy into moving the camera by stroking lights, making patterns and laying down backgrounds can create abstract artistic images. Also known as "camera drag" or "shutter drag".

There are five basic types of light painting or light drawing: Historically they have just been lumped into a category called light painting, there are subclasses of the different ways you can use a light recorder (aka camera) to make photographs of just light or adding subject matter into a light painting or light drawing. A distinction can be made between light painting and light drawings or subgroups of this type of work;

1. Picasso's classic light drawing with a penlight published in Life magazine circa the 1960s.
2. Light painting the subject in a totally dark room with a camera on a tripod, open the camera up and paint light onto the subject with a light source, generally a small penlight.
3. Long exposure with a camera fixed on a tripod. Open the camera up and paint light into the camera – draw light into the camera – use a strobe to freeze the subject, or illuminate the scene with different light sources.
4. Ambient light and strobe. With handheld strobe separate from the camera – in your dark (night) environment – open hand held camera to create a low light expanded time image and set strobe off to freeze subject matter as most photographs do. The strobe is a very short blast of freezing light, and freezes intended subject.
5. Pure Light – Light a Painting (Abstract); With an arrangement of fixed lights in a dark room or studio and a handheld camera – open the handheld camera up and move through the lights painting the light into the camera sensors. Yields images of just light as an abstract design. The reverse can be done with a fixed camera on a tripod and moving lights. Both drawing and painting. Any form of long exposure light art when moving the camera through space rather than the lights themselves is also known as "shutter drag" or "camera drag".

=== Sequential Wave Imprinting Machine (S.W.I.M.) ===
Rotary S.W.I.M. (Sequential Wave Imprinting Machine) is one or more rows of addressable LEDs spun by a motor to display images, text, graphics, and graphs such as a plot of the rotating magnetic field of polyphase motor in polar stationary coordinates.

Modern version of S.W.I.M. made with light-emitting diodes, here displaying the electromagnetic radio wave emitted from a cellular telephone in real-time

In the 1960s and 1970s a row of computer-controlled light sources attached to a stick was waved back-and-forth or spun (by hand or on a motor) to sequentially "imprint" upon the naked eye (or cameras) images, text, graphics, and graphs (plots of mathematical or recorded or live functions), originally using incandescent lamps at high voltage for quick response, and this system was called S.W.I.M. (Sequential Wave Imprinting Machine). Originally a radar system was used to track the position of the S.W.I.M. to appropriately index into the content so that if it was waved backwards the content played backwards, and if it was waved faster the content played faster, etc., such as to create "virtual" content overlaid in near perfect alignment with physical reality. More modern versions of S.W.I.M. use SDR (Software-Defined Radio) combined with inertial measurement units to track position.

==== Rotary S.W.I.M. ====
When the S.W.I.M. is waved in a circular motion rather than reciprocally waved back-and-forth, the tracking system only needs to determine speed, but not direction, and is therefore much easier to implement, not requiring a quadrature detector or direction detector or the like. Such rotary S.W.I.M. is often mounted onto the shaft of a motor, so that it does not need to be waved back-and-forth by hand. In this configuration it can continuously display images, text, graphics, and graphs, such as a plot of the rotating magnetic field in the motor, or its rotor current, in coordinates in which the rotary motion of the motor is cancelled out, so as to make visible various functional aspects of the motor in real-time. Rotary S.W.I.M. is also used for realtime visualization of audio, brain activity, and meditation.

This technology is used commercially so that designers and engineers can visualize and understand a complete electric vehicle powertrain, and not just the motor to which the S.W.I.M. is attached.

==== LED S.W.I.M. ====
Early S.W.I.M. sometimes used colored bulbs, but in 1980, L.E.D.-based versions of the S.W.I.M. were made for both hand-held and wearable use to display images, text, graphics, and graphs in color, while the lower voltages made it safer and easier to use in teaching labs as well as near water and even underwater.

Such displays are often attached to individual drones (e.g. rotors of drones) or make use of drone swarms.

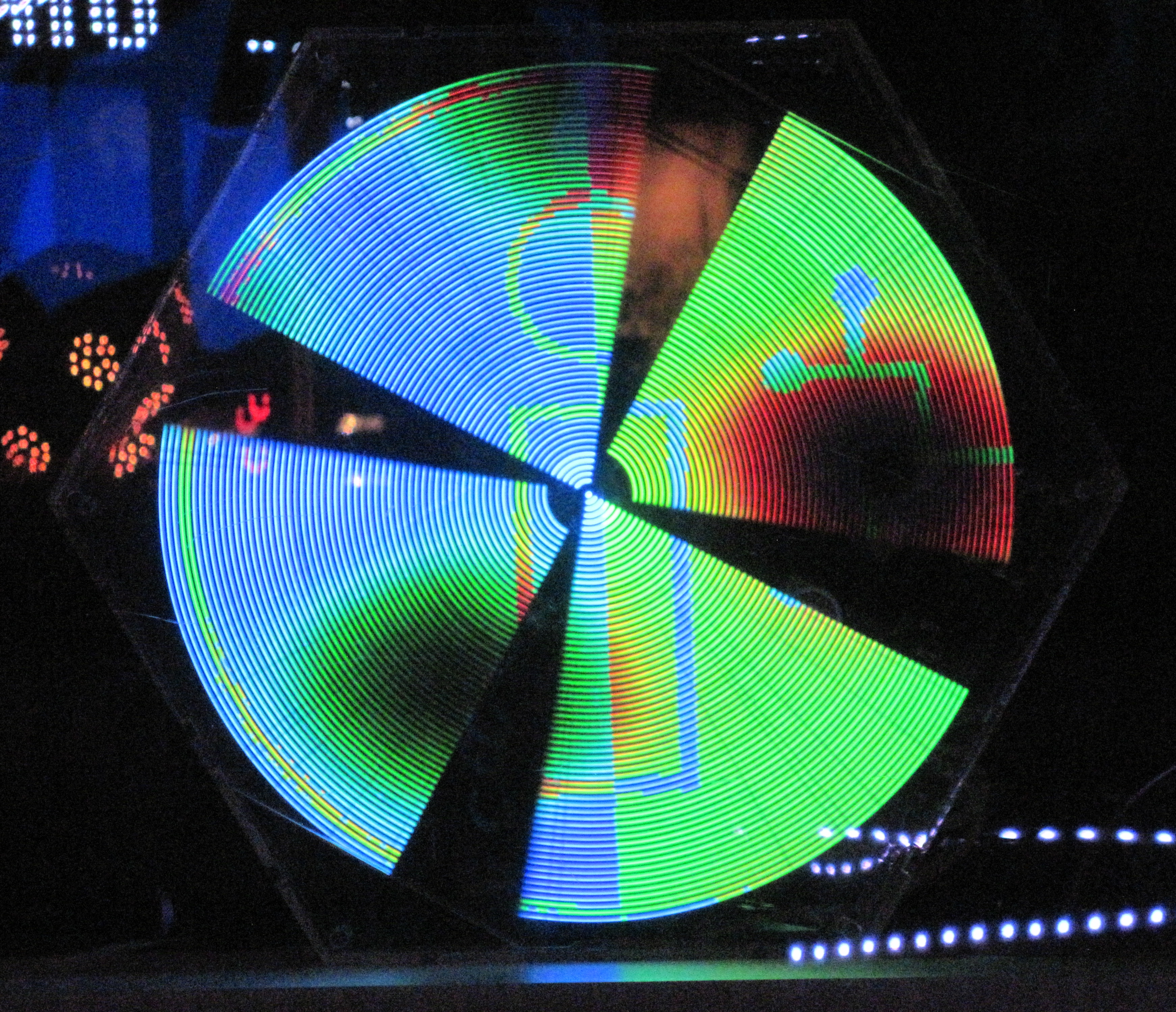
Spinning (rotor) LED display

The term "persistence of vision display" or "POV display" has been used for LED display devices that compose images by displaying one spatial portion at a time in rapid succession, (for example, one column of pixels every few milliseconds). A two-dimensional POV display is often accomplished by means of rapidly moving a single row of LEDs along a linear or circular path. The effect is that the image is perceived as a whole by the viewer as long as the entire path is completed during the visual persistence time of the human eye. A further effect is often to give the illusion of the image floating in mid-air. A three-dimensional POV display is often constructed using a 2D grid of LEDs which is swept or rotated through a volume. POV display devices can be used in combination with long camera exposures to produce light writing.

A common example of this can be seen in the use of bicycle wheel lights that produce patterns.

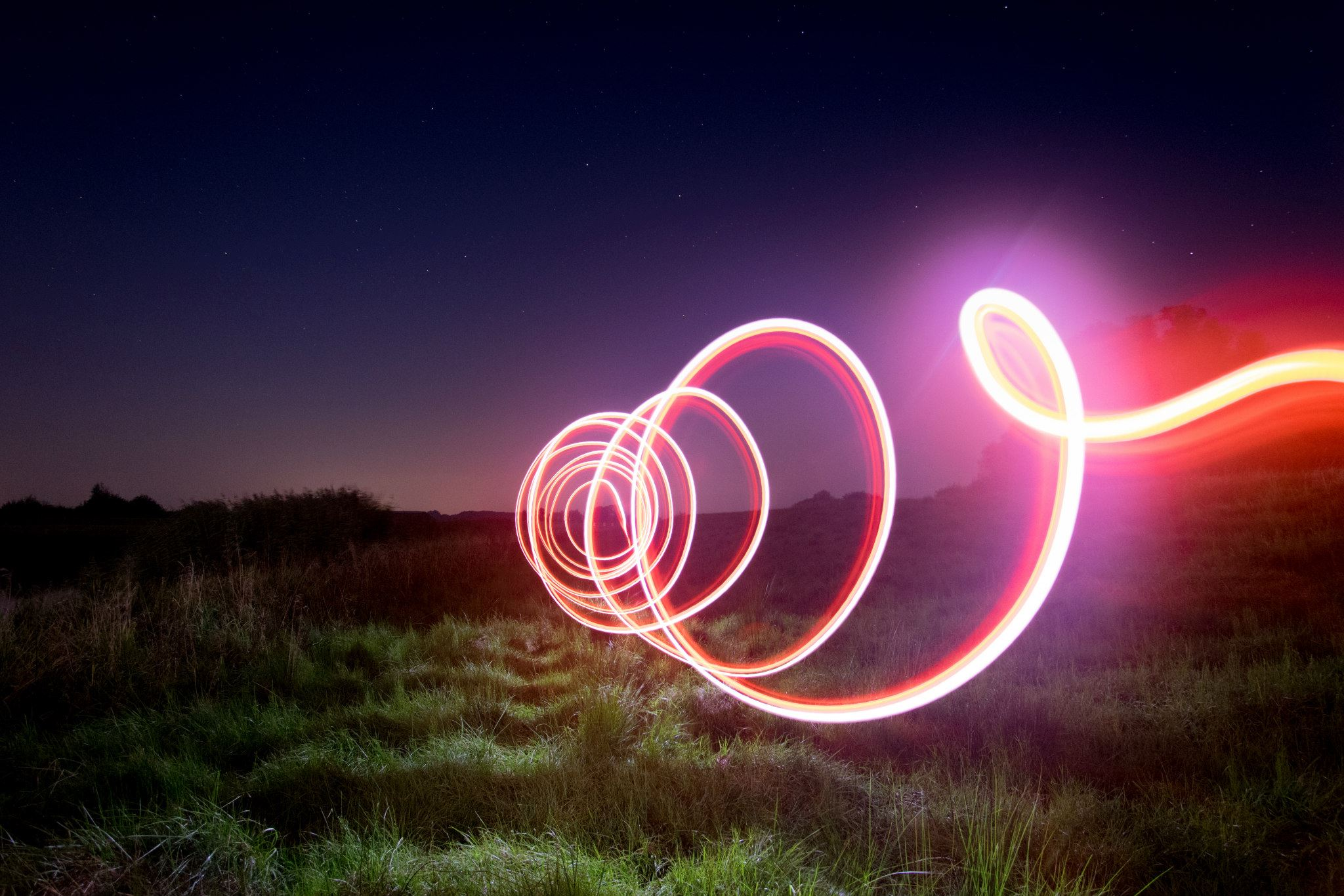
Light Painting Screw by Karsten Knöfler

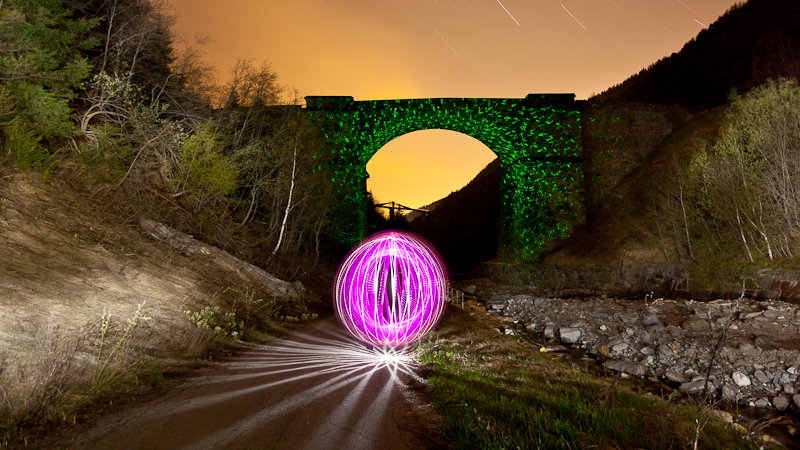
Light art performance photography: laser, LED and long time shot

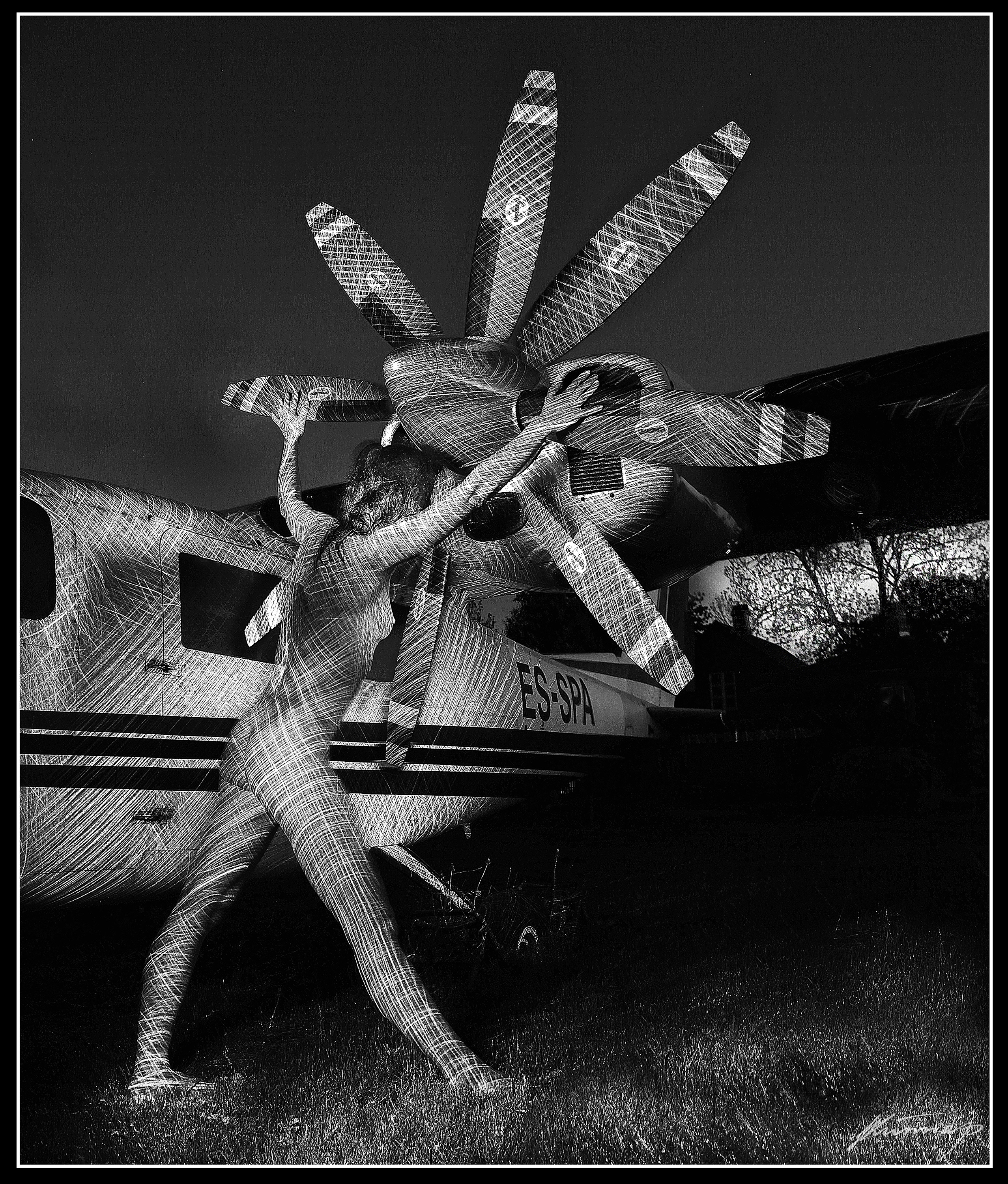
Light engraving XXX by Jaan Künnap

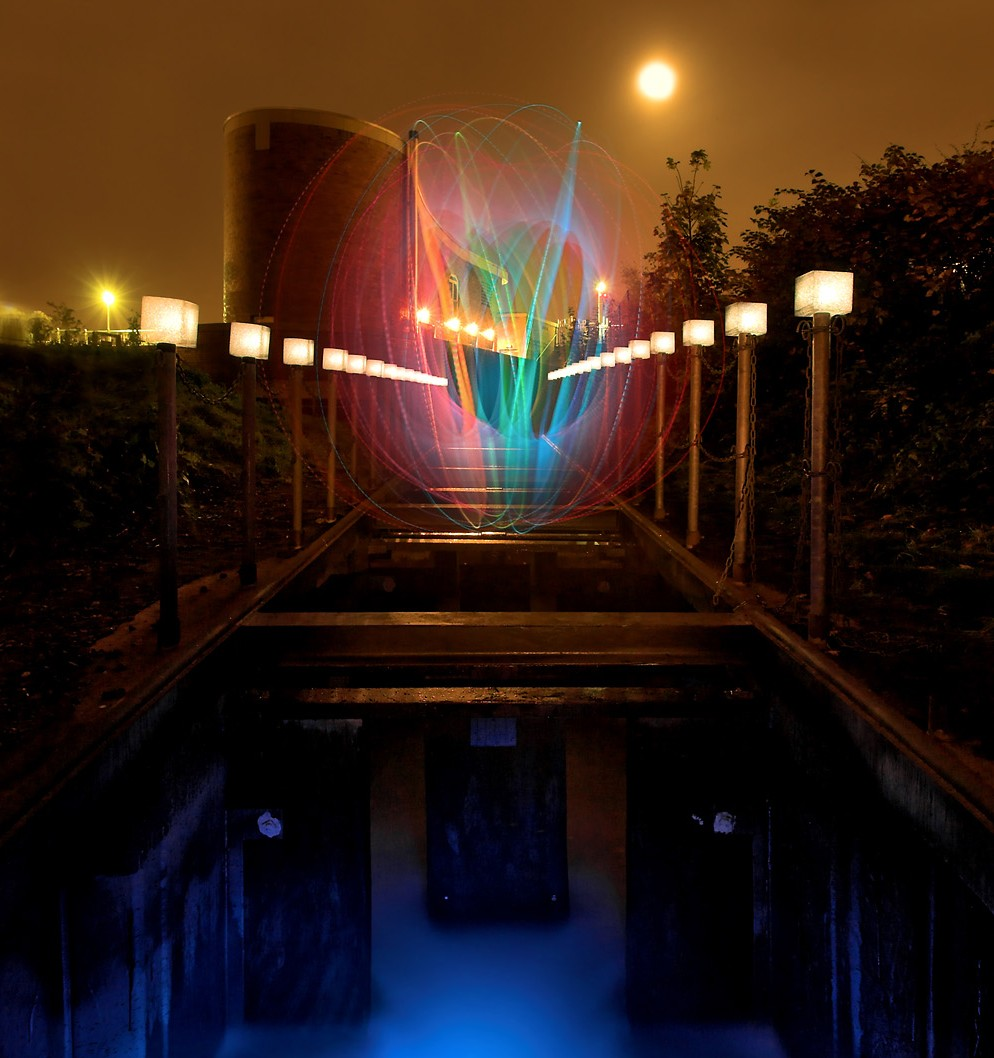
Light art performance photography: Blue Mystery

== Equipment ==
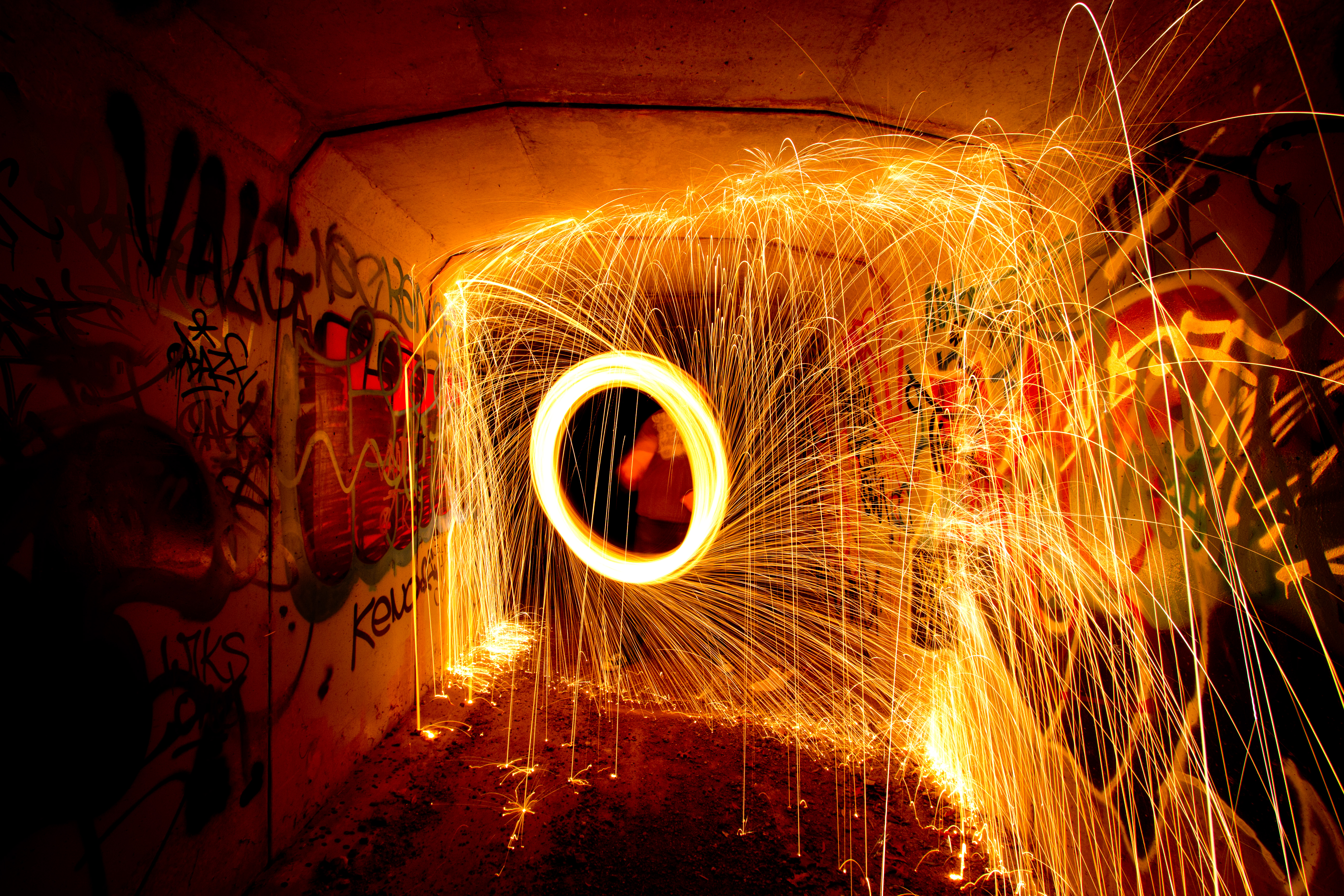
Light painting made by spinning burning steel wool in an enclosed space

A variety of light sources can be used, ranging from simple flashlights to dedicated devices like the Hosemaster, which uses a fiber optic light pen. Other sources of light including candles, matches, fireworks, lighter flints, steel wool, glowsticks, and poi are also popular.

A tripod is usually necessary due to the long exposure times involved. Alternatively, the camera may be placed on or braced against a table or other solid support. A shutter release cable or self-timer is generally employed in order to minimize camera shake. Color gels can also be used to color the light sources.

Some light painters make their own dedicated devices to create light trails over the photo background; this can include computer-controlled devices like the Pixelstick. These devices are often Arduino-controlled LED arrays that can render images that could not be made by drawing in the air with a single light source alone. LED lights, luminescent materials, pyrotechnics, fireworks and flashlights are also used.

Light painters also sometimes employ Persistence of Vision (POV) LED instruments, initially designed for flow art forms/performance art such as hula hoops, poi, Fiber optic whips, and staff. These high-speed POV LED wands, whips, and other flow tools are very effectively adapted as light painting brushes due to their focus on usability and maneuverability. Their utility is often further enhanced by the integration of accelerometers, remote control systems, as well as durability leading to much more comfort in creating complex imagery.

== Important artists ==
- Pablo Picasso (1881–1973)
- Man Ray (1890–1976)
- Barbara Morgan (born 1900)
- Gjon Mili (1904–1984)
- Andreas Feininger (1906–1999)
- Jack Delano (1914–1997)
- Georges Mathieu (1921–2012)
- Eric Staller (born 1947)
- Vicki DaSilva (born 1960)
- Sven Doornkaat (born 1968)
- JanLeonardo (born 1970)
- Reid Godshaw (born 1989)
- Alexandr Gnezdilov (born 1979)

== Awards and recognition ==
- Deutscher Preis für Wissenschaftsfotografie 2008 – 1. Platz

== See also ==
- Accent lighting
- Available light
- Fire performance
- Glowsticking
- Kinetic photography
- Light art
- Night photography
