= Jacques Pugin =

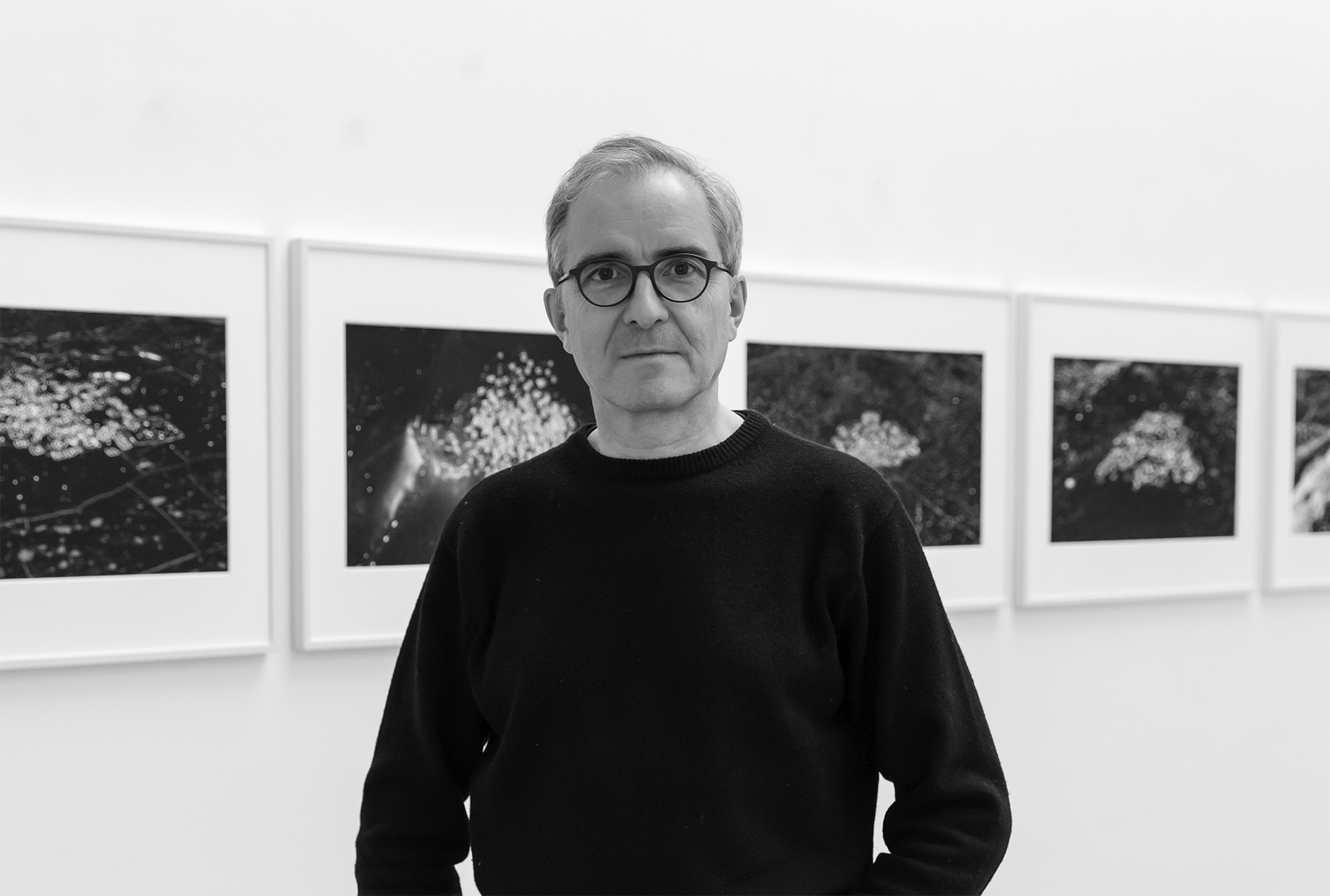
- Jacques Pugin at the EW Galerie in Paris ...
- Born: May 20, 1954 (age 72); Riaz, Switzerland
- Website: www.jacquespugin.ch

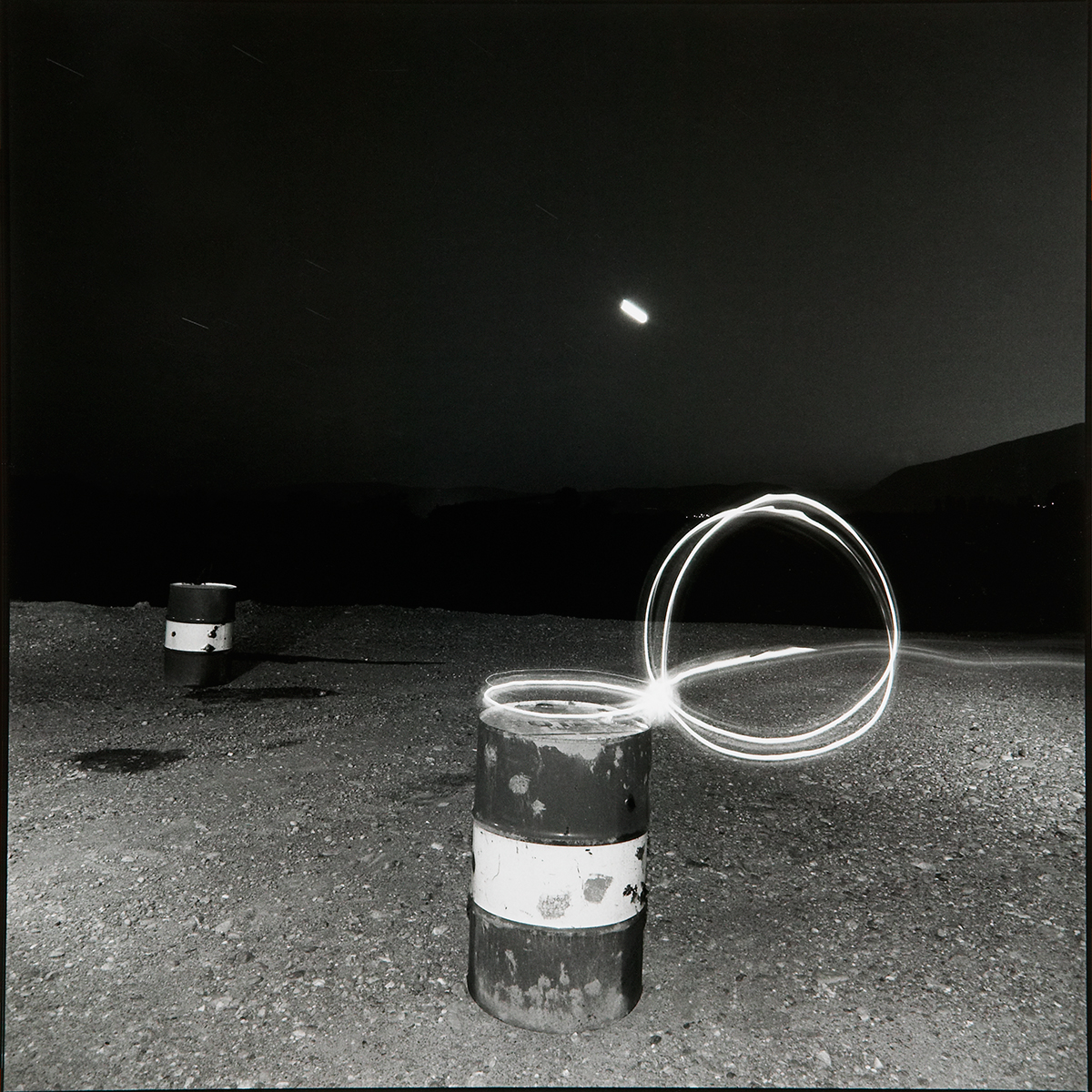
Grafted graffiti #19, 1979, gelatin silver print, 16 x 12’’, 40 x 30 cm, vintage print

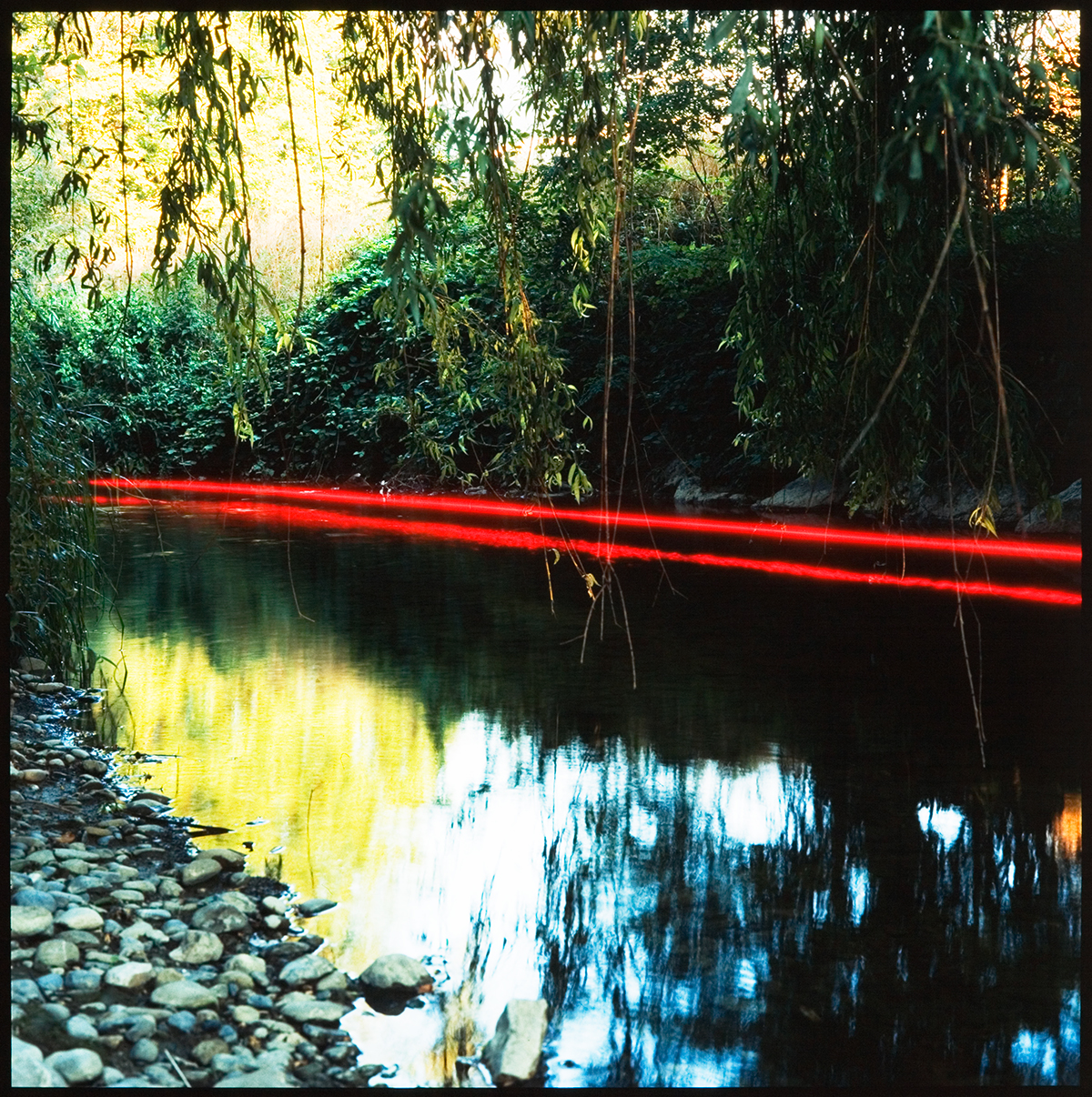
Red Graffiti #11, 1979, Michel Fresson print, 12 x 12’’, 30 x 30 cm, vintage print

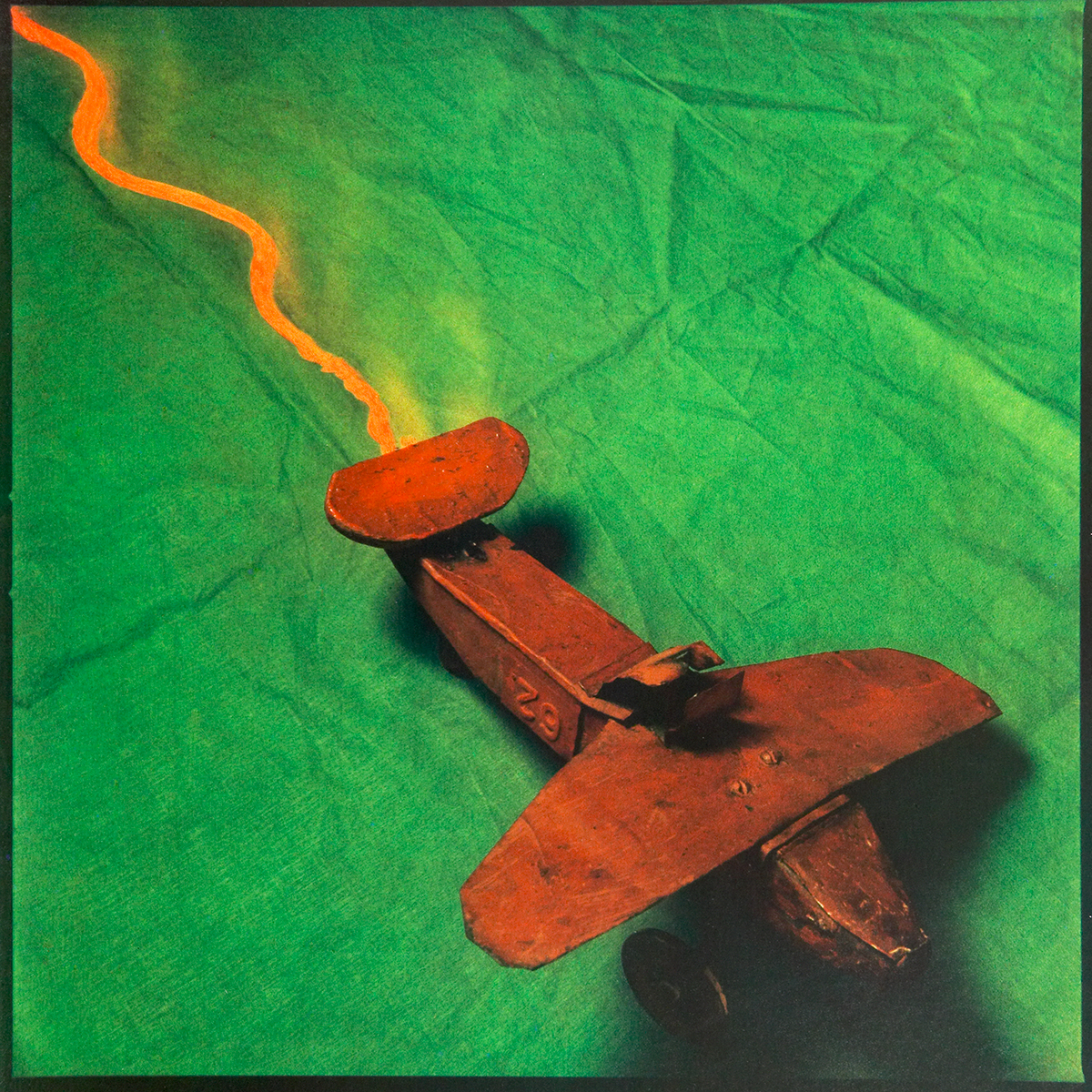
Toys #08, 1984, Michel Fresson print, 12 x 12’’, 30 x 30 cm, vintage print

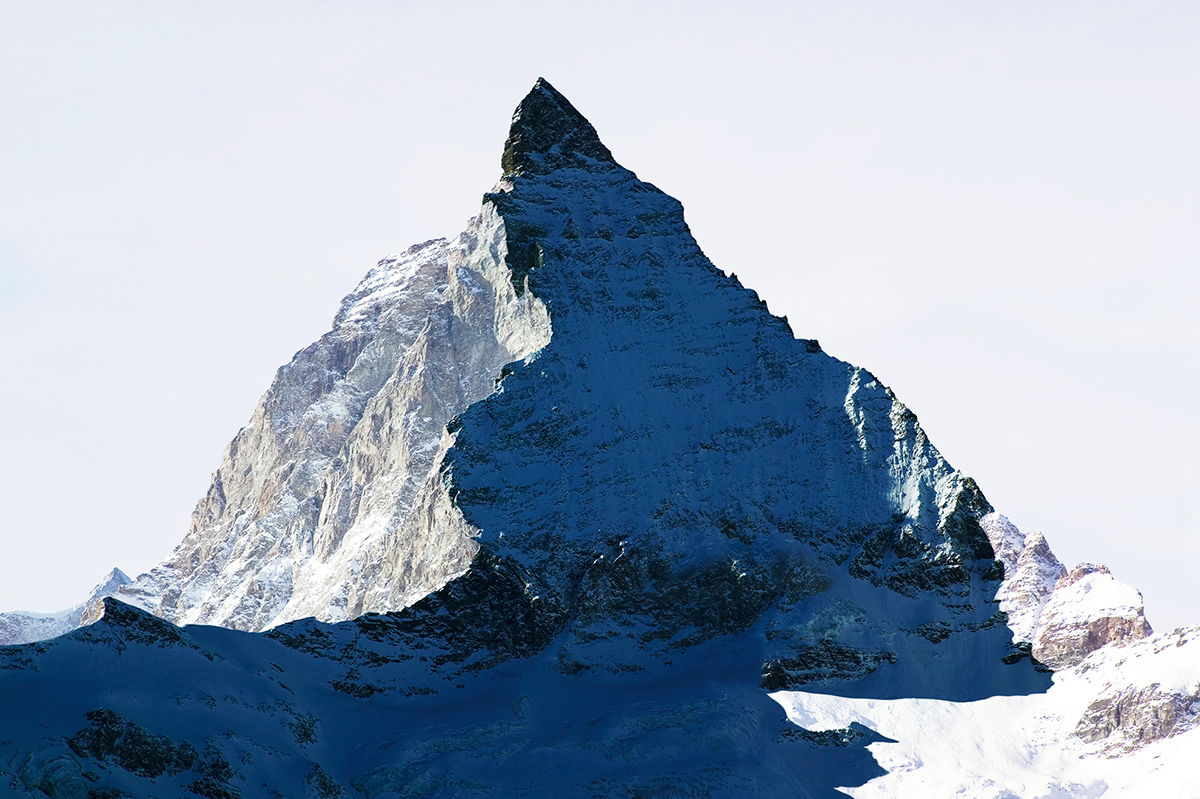
Mountain Shadow #09, 2005, Rag Hahnemühle Paper print, 43 x 63’’, 107 x 160 cm

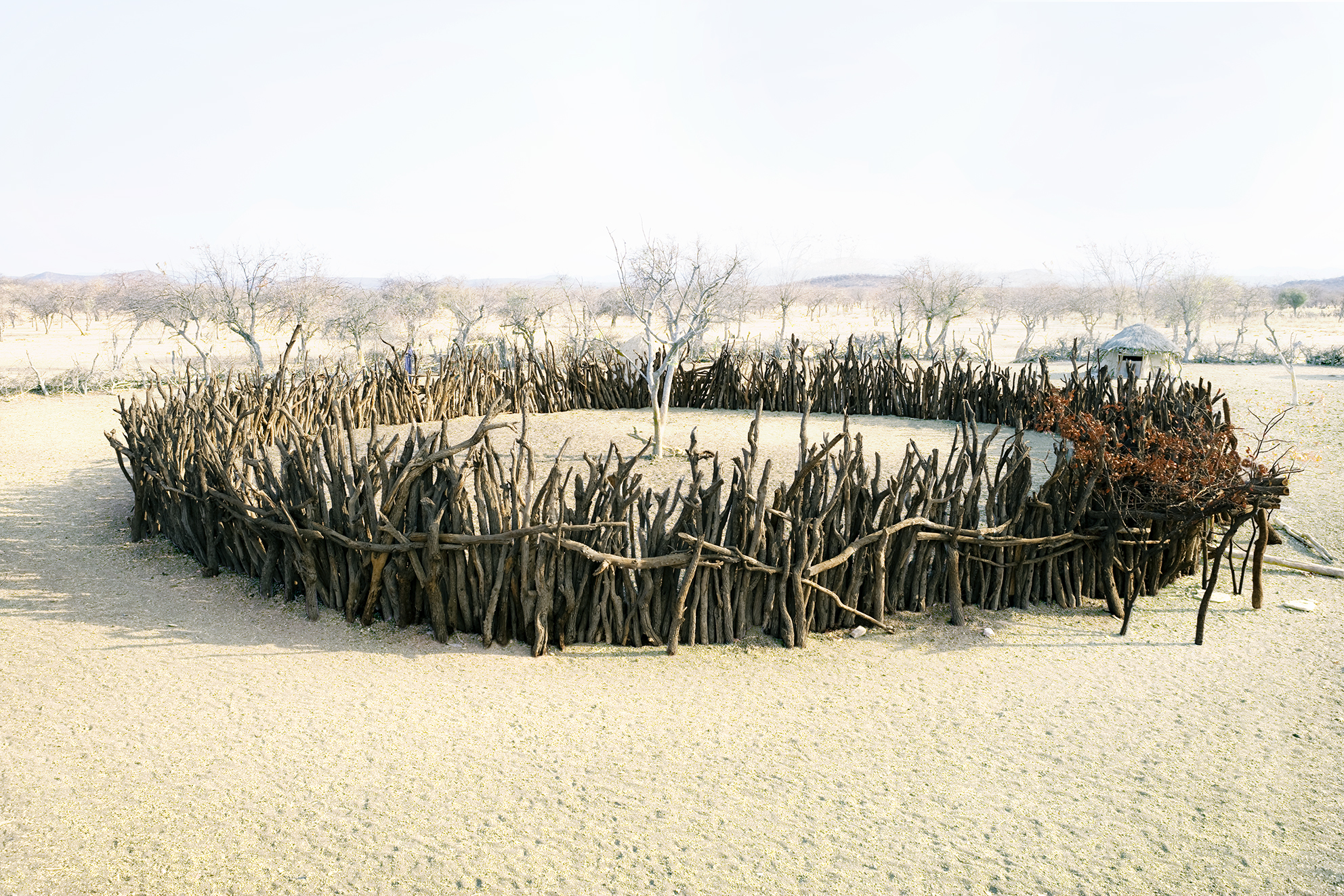
304 Sacred Site, Namibia, 2007, Rag Hahnemühle Paper print, 40 x 60 cm

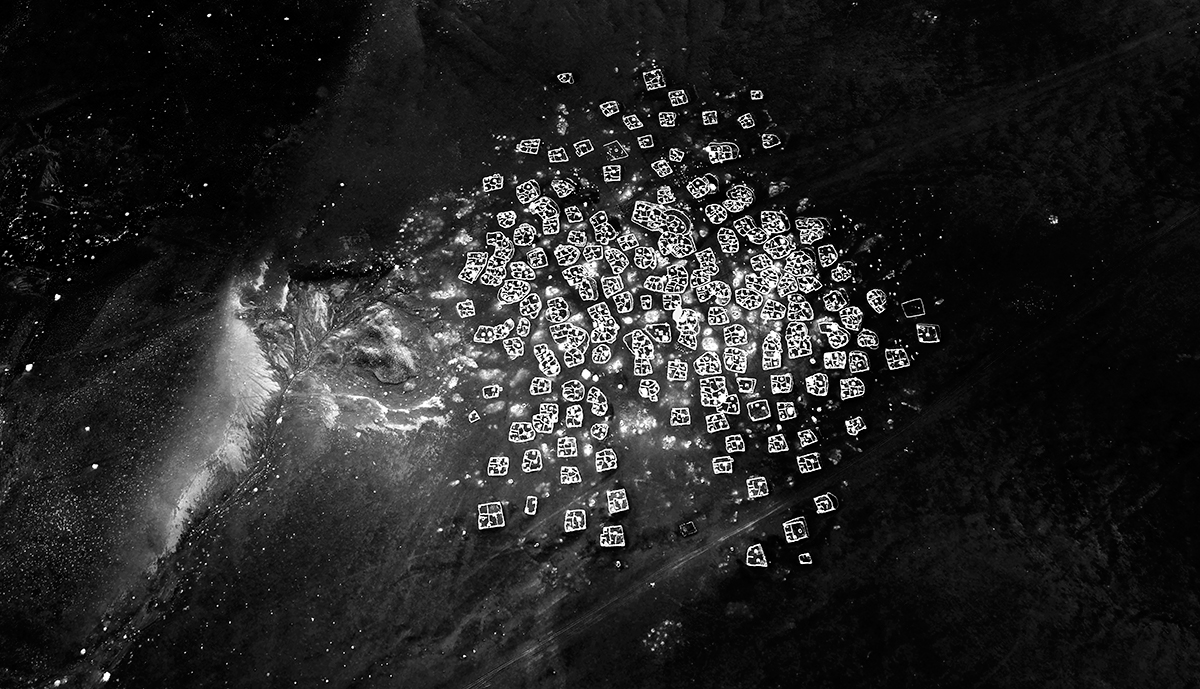
The knights of the devil #60, 2013, Rag Hahnemühle Paper print, 17 x 25’’, 42 x 73 cm

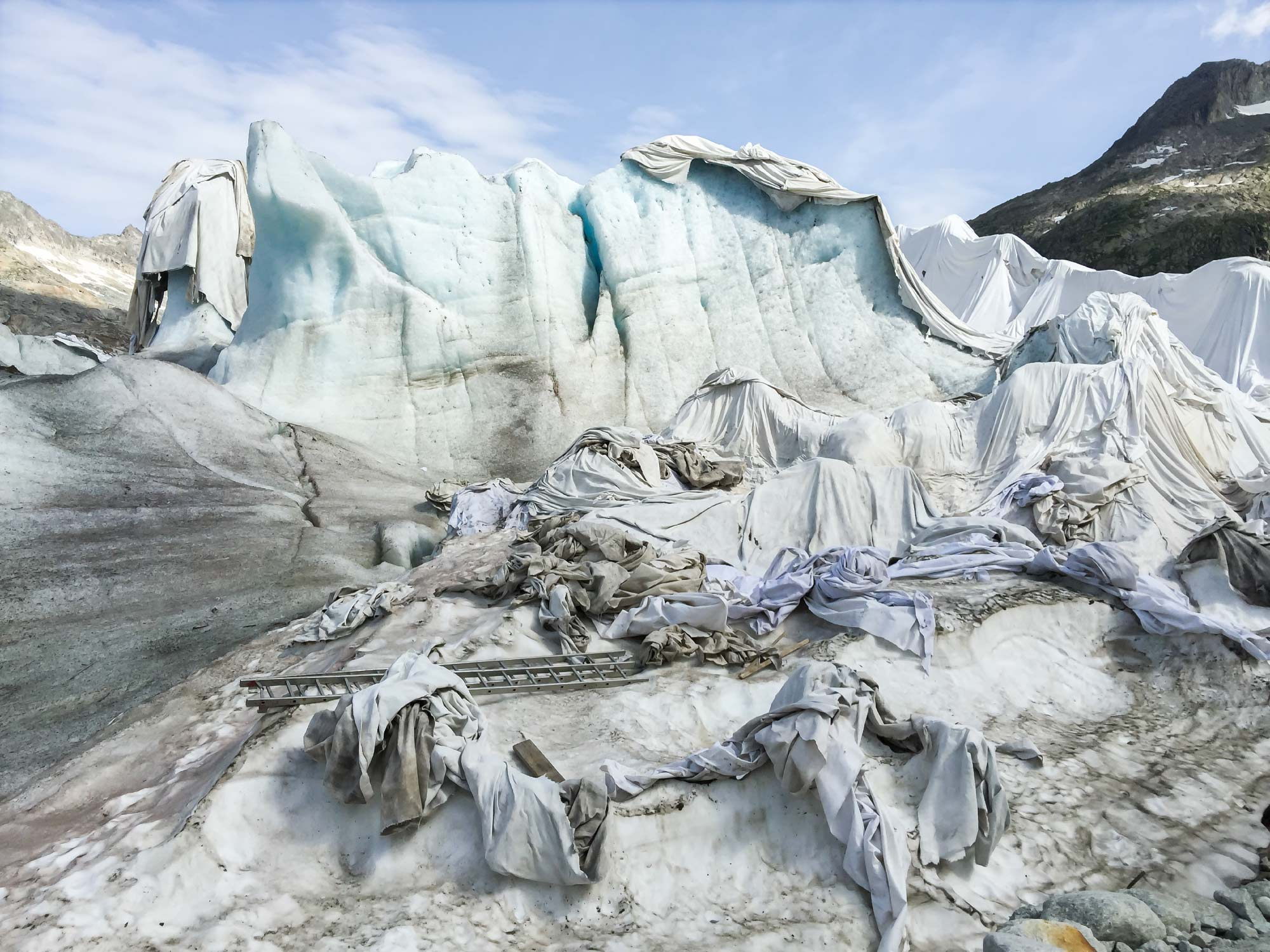
Glaciers #001, Rhonegletscher, 2015, Rag Hahnemühle Paper print, 24 x 32’’, 60 x 80 cm

Jacques Pugin (born May 20, 1954 in Riaz, Switzerland) is an artist-photographer. He is one of the precursors of the Light Painting technique, which consists in capturing luminous traces during the photographic process, either via direct exposure of the sensor to the light source, or else to a lit subject. Jacques constructs his images by intervening either in the actual capturing process (incamera) or in post-production, using various techniques, such as drawing, painting or digital tools. If the subject of his early work was the Body, since then he primarily photographs Nature. A feature of Jacques Pugin's work is his particular focus on traces or signs, that indicate the presence of human or natural elements in the landscape. His photographs are a reflection on time, space and the complex relation between man and nature.

== Biography ==
At 18, against his father's will, Jacques Pugin moves to Zurich to become a photographer. Suzanne Abelin, who runs Gallery 38, one of the first galleries in Switzerland dedicated to photography, curates his first solo exhibition in 1977. In 1978, he moves to his first studio in Geneva, where he meets many artists. He then travels to Greece, where he produces a photographic work for which he obtains in 1979 the Federal Grant of Applied Arts (Switzerland). He goes on to make the series titled Grafted Graffiti, using light painting. This series has been widely exhibited and published on an international level. Three years in a row he obtains the Federal Grant of Fine Arts (Switzerland) in 1980, 1981 and 1982.

In 1983, he keeps working with Red Graffiti investigating colour technique. In 1984 he produces a series Toys. This series is in the collection of the Centre Pompidou in Paris and in the private collection of Mr. and Mrs Auer, who will publish the stills in the book "A History of Photography" in 2003.

In 1985, at the triennial of Fribourg in Switzerland, Polaroid makes available a 50 x 60 cm camera with which Jacques creates the series The Polaroids, a series which now forms part of the eponymous collection. The same year, J. Pugin was entered into " the International Encyclopaedia of photographers from 1939 to today ", published by Camera Obscura.

In the 1990s, Jacques Pugin becomes interested in the still images as they are taken from a video source, giving rise to a series of photographs entitled Blue Mountain and a book of the same name, with text by Jean-Michel Olivier, published by Idees et Calendes. His investigations then develop into a few series on the theme of vegetation.

In the 2000s, he travels worldwide – especially to African deserts, India and Latin America- for a large work entitled Sacred Sites (2002–present), supported by a grant of the Leenaards Foundation. Since 2005 he also devotes his practice to mountain landscapes, with his series The Mountain Shadow.

In 2013 he finishes the series The knights of the devil, a photographic work with geopolitical scope started in 2008, about the signs left by the remnants of the civil war in Darfur.

== Works ==
Grafted graffiti (1978–1979). In his photographs dating back to the 1970s, Jacques Pugin uses light as a pencil that allows him to draw within the photographic process (Light Painting). In this way, he uses a candle to draw shapes in the landscape or to highlight its contours. By modifying the appearance of places or landscapes, incorporating in his photographs traces that connect invisible links between present, past and future, Jacques Pugin invests his photographs with symbolism.

Red Graffiti (1983). Investigating colour with the technique of light painting, the photographer uses elements floating on water or wind to symbolize the passage of time.

Toys (1984). In this series, luminous traces highlight and bind bodies and toys that coexist within a given image. This work is part of the collection of the Centre Georges Pompidou in Paris.

Blue Mountain (1995–1998). In the mid- 1990s Jacques Pugin began to use computers as a tool to work on the image. Unlike Land Art artists, who work in a particular place using found materials, that they then typically capture, his approach is to shoot raw landscapes. He then modifies the image, using different tools, bringing straight lines or curves, and/ or adding shadows and light. In his work " Blue Mountains ", he combines both infography and coloured pencil towards a pictorial result, halfway between photography and painting.

Sacred sites (2001–2013). This photographic work supported by a grant from the Leenaards Foundation began in 2001. The series borrows its title " Sacred Sites " from Australian aborigines living near Uluru (Ayers Rock), who give this name to what they consider to be their sacred places, surrounding them with fences to protect them. Today the artist widens this project by photographing locations around the world, such as desert, depopulated areas and natural sites. He captures traces that evidence human presence in the landscape and uses several means to highlight these traces in the image. His photographs are a reflection on time, space and the complex relationship between man and nature. Within this series we can find many enclosures, buildings, or traces of nomadic dwellings characterized by their circular shape. Jacques Pugin captures these places as though they were man-made sculptures made with natural materials found on site.

Mountain Shadow (2005–2013). In this work, the photographer seeks to purify his images to bring out the essence and strength of the mountain. Working primarily on the shadows which then become traces, it redirects the glance and thinking towards a new inquiry.

The knights of the devil (2008–2013). For the first time in his career, Jacques Pugin has chosen to work on images that are not his own, using clichés that are borrowed from the internet, namely satellite images taken from Google Earth. This time, the traces are the vestiges of the civil war in Darfur: abuse performed by the Janjawids, (the knights of the devil) who raped the women, killed the children, slaughtered the population, before burning the villages, leaving nothing but the ashes of homes and fences. Jacques Pugin has chosen to apply to his images a double treatment : firstly, by draining all color, turning them into black and white, and secondly, by inverting them, pointing to the symbolic and fundamentally dark, negative nature of the barbarity that they witness. If this work can be seen to belong to the Pugin's continued researched on traces started in 1979, with the Grafted graffiti series, this time his drive is primarily a political one. Conscious of journalists' lack of access into the Darfur region, the artist questions the role of the internet by indirectly transforming Google Earth into a reporting tool that witnesses from high above.

== Grants ==
- 1979 Swiss Design awards, Switzerland
- 1980-1981-1982 Swiss Arts awards, Switzerland
- 1980 Grant from the City of Geneva "Lissignol-Chevalier", Switzerland
- 1981 Grant from the City of Geneva "Berthoud", Switzerland
- 2001 Grant of Leenaards Foundation, Lausanne, Switzerland

== Collections ==
- Collections of Bibliothèque Nationale, Paris, France
- Cabinet des Estampes, Geneva, Switzerland
- Swiss Foundation for Photography, Fotostiftung Schweiz, Winterthur, Switzerland
- Elysée Museum, Lausanne, Switzerland
- Municipal Contemporary Art Funds Geneva, Switzerland.
- Canton Geneva Contemporary Art Fund, Switzerland.
- The Polaroid Collection, Cambridge (USA),
- Réattu Museum, Collection of Photographs of International Festival "Rencontres d'Arles", France
- Collection of Nicephore Niepce Museum in Châlon-sur-Saône, France
- Goro International Press, Tokyo, Japan
- Fribourg Museum of Art and History, Switzerland.
- M+M Auer Collection, Hermance, Switzerland.
- André L'Huillier Collection, Geneva, Switzerland.
- Photographic collection of the City of Montpellier, France
- Bernard Arnault Collection, France
- Chopard Collection, Switzerland
- Centre for Photography, Geneva, Switzerland
- Collection of the Gothard Bank, Lugano, Switzerland
- Collection of Centre Georges Pompidou, Paris, France
- Collection of Julius Baer Bank, Switzerland
- and other private collections.

== Solo exhibitions ==
- 2015 As part of the Month of Photography in Montreal, the exhibition "The knights of the devil", The post-photographic condition, curator Joan Fontcuberta, Canada
- 2015 As part of the Photofolies the exhibition "The khights of the devil" and the exhibition "Grafted Graffiti", Sainte Catherine Gallery, Rodez, France
- 2015 Esther Woerdehoff Gallery, Paris, "Les cavaliers du diable" and "Sacred Site", France
- 2010 Kowasa Gallery, Barcelona, Spain
- 2009 Krisal Gallery, Carouge Geneva "La Montagne s'ombre", Switzerland
- 2009 Elysée Museum, Lausanne (Switzerland)
- 2006 Krisal Gallery, Carouge Geneva "La Montagne s'ombre", Switzerland
- 2005 in Store, Brussels, "Sacred Site", Belgium
- 2004 Chambre Claire Gallery, Annecy "Blue Mountain and Sacred Site", France
- 2002 Osmoz Gallery, Bulle (FR) "La Montagne Bleue", Switzerland
- 2002 Krisal Gallery, Carouge Geneva " Les déserts ", Switzerland
- 2000 Photoforum PasquArt, Bienne, "La montagne bleue", Switzerland
- 1999 Fischlin Gallery, "Traversée du désir", Nyon, Switzerland
- 1995 Fischlin Gallery, Geneva, Switzerland
- 1993 Photoforum Pasquart, Bienne, Switzerland
- 1990/91 Photography Centre de la Photographie Geneva, Switzerland
- 1990 SPECTRUM Gallery (in collaboration with Photography Centre Geneva), Zaragoza, Spain
- 1988 Palace of Congress and Culture, Le Mans Image Festival, France
- 1987 Elysee Museum, Lausanne, Switzerland
- 1984 Culture House of Rennes, Rennes, France 1984 Gallery Espace UN, Geneva, Switzerland
- 1983 Canon Gallery, Amsterdam, Netherlands
- 1983 Fotografia Oltre Gallery, Chiasso, Switzerland
- 1983 Viviane Esders Gallery, Paris, France
- 1982 Suzanne Kupfer Gallery, Bienne, Switzerland
- 1982 Canon Gallery, Geneva, Switzerland
- 1981 Viviane Esders Gallery, Paris, France
- 1980 Edwind Engelberts Gallery, Geneva, Switzerland
- 1979 Jean-Jacques Hofstetter Gallery, Fribourg, Switzerland
- 1977 Lost Steps Gallery, Bulle, Switzerland
- 1977 Gallery 38, Zurich, Switzerland

== Books and catalogues ==
- 2014 "The knights of the devil" with preface of Christian Caujolle
- 2014 "Mountain Shadow" with the text of Daniel Girardin, the curator of the Museum of Elysée in Lausanne
- 2006 Book 36 photographs by Jacques Pugin, with a text by Daniel Girardin, curator of the Museum of Elysée in Lausanne, Switzerland
- 1997 "Blue Mountain" with photographs of Jacques Pugin, preface by Jean-Michel Olivier, Collection Photoarchives 10, Ides et Calendes, Neuchâtel, Switzerland.
- 1990 Catalogue "Jacques Pugin" SPAS Locarno, Switzerland
- 1990 Catalogue " Trace in the physical world ", Center of Photography, Geneva, Switzerland
- 1983 Catalogue, Fotografia Oltre Gallery, Switzerland
- 1982 Catalogue "Space-Line" Canon Gallery, Geneva, Switzerland
- 1980 "Graffiti greffés I" portfolio, E. Engelberts Gallery, Switzerland "Graffitis greffés II" portfolio, E. Engelberts Gallery, Switzerland "Five meters" E. Engelberts Gallery, Switzerland
- 1979 Catalogue "Graffiti greffés" E. Engelberts Gallery, Geneva, Switzerland
