= JanLeonardo =

German photographer, author and speaker

JanLeonardo (born Jan Wöllert; 30 July 1970, Cuxhaven) is a German photographer, author and speaker of fine-art photography.

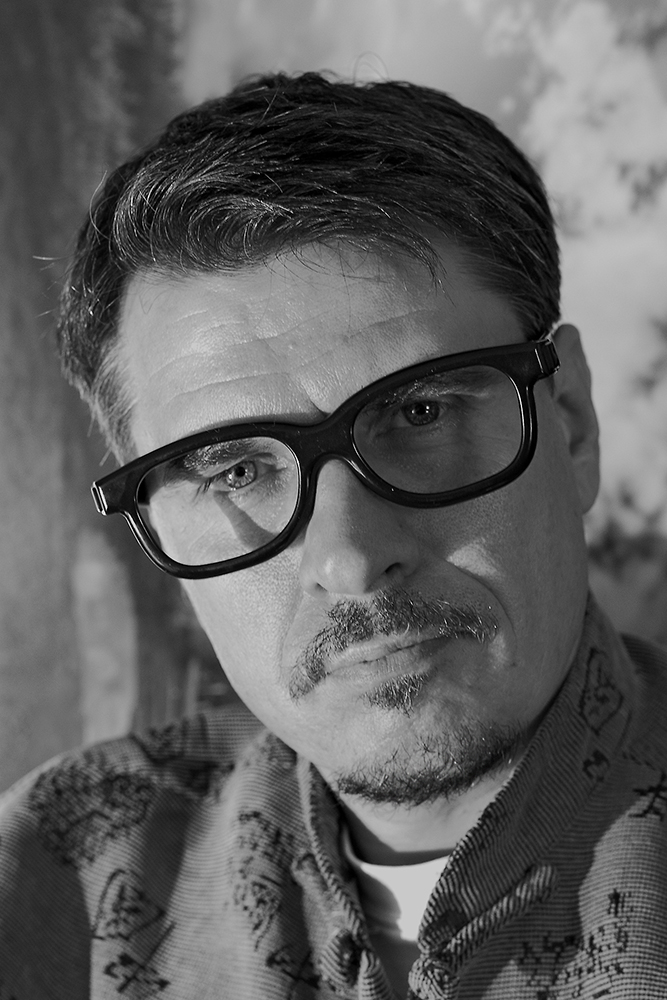
JanLeonardo

== Biography ==
JanLeonardo started off as a self-educated person in photography, preferably working at nighttime. Later on he became assistant of Reinhart-Wolf-Award laureate Stephan Meyer-Bergfeld. As an artist he has worked exclusively with bulb exposures in darkness or nighttime since 2005. His personal challenge is patterned, controlled and choreographed artificial light, staged and organized in a performance. His photographs are easily mixed up with photos altered by image editing or digital images from scratch. He lives in the town of Bremen.

In 2013 JanLeonardo initiated the International Light Painting Award to internationally promote light art performance photography and light painting. The recipients are chosen bi-annually by an international jury consisting of representatives from industry and the arts. In 2013 the award was endowed with non-cash prizes worth of €9,800.

From 2013 to 2016 JanLeonardo cooperated with the computer giant Lenovo. The world biggest computer company used the light painting photographs for social media advertising, tradeshows and mobile devices.

In 2014 JanLeonardo and Carlotta Bertelli were invited from the town Corigliano Calabro in Italy to photograph the town with lightpainting. The photographs were presented during the festival Corigliano Calabro Fotografia in the ducal Castello di Corigliano Calabro.

In 2016 the artist organized an international light painting exhibition and congress for photokina 2016.

In 2017 JanLeonardo and the gallery owner Curtis Briggs organized a light painting fundraising campaign for the internationally known boarding school Schule Schloss Salem and Kurt Hahn Foundation.

== Awards and recognition ==
- German prize for science photography – 1. price (Deutscher Preis für Wissenschaftsfotografie)
- WissenSchafftBilder 2008 – 3. price
- LIGHT photo contest – 2. price, category nature

== Selected exhibitions ==
- 2008: Haus der Wissenschaft Bremen – Deutscher Preis für Wissenschaftsfotografie
- 2012: Art Room9 Galerie München – Night Views
- 2013: Poimena Gallery Tasmania Australia – Luminous Nocturnal
- 2013: Espace Piere Cardin – Exposition Internationale de Light-Painting Paris
- 2014: Art Room9 Galerie München – Painting Lights & Jungle Nights
- 2014: Waves of Shining Light – New Town Plaza – Hong Kong 2014
- 2014: Exposition Lumières, L'Embarcadère

== Selected published works ==
- Faszination Lichtmalerei – JanLeonardo Wöllert & Jörg Miedza – dpunkt Verlag 2010 –ISBN 978-3-89864-669-7
- Painting with Light – JanLeonardo Wöllert & Jörg Miedza – Rocky Nook USA 2011–ISBN 978-1-933952-74-1
- Fotografieren statt knipsen – Rudolf Krahm – dpunkt Verlag 2011 – ISBN 978-3-89864-555-3
- Wilde Seite der Fotografie 2.0 – Cyrill Harnischmacher Hrsg. – dpunkt Verlag 2012 – ISBN 978-3-89864-777-9
- Nacht- und Restlichtfotografie – Meike Fischer – dpunkt Verlag 2013 – ISBN 978-3-86490-011-2
- Foto-Kalender 2011: Quest – Verlag National Geographic – ISBN 978-9460440205
- Digital Photo – Lichtkunst in Perfektion – February 2010
- Fine Art Printer – Lichtmalerei mit LED – January 2011
- Foto Digital – Lichtkünstler – January/February 2011
- ProfiFoto – Light Art Performance Photography – March 2011
- c't spezial Digitale Fotografie – Getanztes Licht – April 2011
- Pictures Magazin – Light Art Performance Photography – May 2014
- Popular Photography – JanLeonardo – Low Light Scenery – July 2013 (China)

== Television features ==
- German Light Artist Illuminates Detian Falls – China Central Television (CCTV) – 10 April 2009
- Exposition Internationale de Light Painting LPWA France – 21 January 2014
- Licht gestalten – Fotograf Jan Leonardo Wöllert – Euromaxx – 30 December 2011
- Der einzigartige Stil vom deutschen Fotografen JanLeonardo – THVL – 18 October 2013
- El artista Jan Leonardo Wöllert en nuestra serie"Juegos de luces" – Euromaxx – 16 April 2012
- Lichtkünstler – JanLeonardo (LAPP-PRO) – Radio Bremen – 8 October 2009
- Lichtkunst unterm Hirschgarten (Munich) – München TV – 10 May 2014
- Spectacular long exposure photography – Euromaxx/ DW – 24 November 2018

== Assignments and campaigns ==
- State capital Munich: Business Report 2013
- Tokio Motor Show: Poster Design
- Beitrag Stipendienfonds zugunsten der Kurt-Hahn-Stiftung Schule Schloss Salem

== Citations ==
- Lichtfang / Gestalten mit Lichtgrafik – Jeanette Bohn – Diplomarbeit FH Wiesbaden 2009
- Tangible High Touch Visuals – Klanten, Ehrmann, Hübner – Die Gestalten Verlag GmbH 2009 – ISBN 978-3-89955-232-4
- Die wilde Seite der Fotografie – Cyrill Harnischmacher Hrsg. – dpunkt Verlag 2009 ISBN 978-3898646697
- Night Photography – Lance Keimig – Focal Press USA 2010 – ISBN 978-0-240-81258-8
- Licht – Gestaltung und Technologie – Bergische Universität Wuppertal, Fachbereich F – Design und Kunst, Sommersemester 2011 – Forschungs- und Lehrgebiet Professor Jürg Steiner – Dajana Richter
- Light Painting und die Veränderung durch die Digitale Fotografie mit besonderer Beachtung von LAPP – Dipl-Ing Lydia Mantler- Diplomarbeit FH St. Pölten 2014
- Light Painting / Entwicklung eines Pixel-Sticks Bachelorarbeit Universität Koblenz Landau 2016 vorgelegt von Marius Köpcke
