= Vicki DaSilva =

American photographer

- Born: c. 1960
- Known for: Light art, graffiti
- Notable work: Never Sorry, 'Art Takes Time Square'

Vicki DaSilva (born c. 1960) is an American light painter and graffiti artist. She makes single frame time exposure photographs at night, which she terms ‘light graffiti’.

== Career ==
DaSilva moved to New York City in 1983 after receiving her BFA from Kutztown University of Pennsylvania, where she met Keith Haring, a Kutztown native.

She was heavily influenced by the convergence of street and graffiti art during the birth of hip-hop that created a lasting graffiti love affair with light replacing spray paint. Her exploration of light graffiti and light painting as a multi-disciplinary, time-based art form anchored in the photographic process continues to push boundaries of intervention art.

DaSilva did an internship and worked as an assistant for several years with video and performance artist Joan Jonas. Through Jonas she was introduced to many artists including Richard Serra, for whom she worked as a personal assistant throughout the 1980s.

Her first full-time job in NYC was as photographer Gary Schneider’s first darkroom assistant. Towards the end of the 1980s, she started experimenting with 4 foot fluorescent lamps in her work by simply turning them off or on, dragging them through a space, or installing them to pulley systems, creating sheets of light. In the early 2000s she moved towards using 8 foot fluorescent lamps and eventually turned the lamp vertically and began walking with it. She continues to make both light graffiti works with compact fluorescent bulbs and light painting works using 8 foot fluorescent lamps.

DaSilva came to the attention of a wider audience when she began posting documentation of her work on YouTube in 2009. The video documentation of DaSilva's image-making process has become an increasingly important part of her work as it not only allows viewers to see how the photographs are made but also allows for the performative aspect of her work to be included in the final image.

In 2012 her work, Never Sorry was chosen from 35,000 entries to be displayed on a dozen billboards in Times Square, New York, for the 'Art Takes Time Square' event. Never Sorry, in tribute to Chinese artist Ai Weiwei, was created using a compact fluorescent bulb with a yellow color gel, representing the idea of the 'Jasmine Revolution'.

In 2016, DaSilva was awarded Visual Artist of the Year by The Linny Awards from The ArtsQuest Foundation. The Linny Awards, named after the late Marlene ‘Linny’ Fowler of Bethlehem, honor Fowler’s dedication to and support of the arts, while celebrating the extraordinary artists, arts educators, businesses and philanthropists who live and work in the Greater Lehigh Valley.

== Sources ==
- The Best Anti Trump Art From Around The World PAPER Mag, July 14, 2016, http://www.papermag.com/trump-art-portfolio-1922847323.html
- Donald Trump Loser, by Artist Vicki DaSilva, in Front of His Building, March 2, 2016.
- Artists to Watch: Holiday Edition artnet news, December 9, 2015.
- Going Public Hedge Magazine, 37, The Mayfair Issue, September 24, 2015, https://issuu.com/squareupmedia/docs/h37/42
- Vicki DaSilva, East River Flows Art in the Parks NYC Parks, August 31, 2015.
- NYC's Newest Outdoor Art The Wall Street Journal, June 9, 2015.
- Vicki DaSilva's Light Graffiti Promotes Campaign for Syria artnet news, March 19, 2015.
- Artist Renders East River Flows in Light Graffiti artnet news, August 4, 2014.
- Q&A with Light Graffiti Artist Vicki DaSilva Amsterdam News, May 14, 2014.
- Vicki DaSilva Interviews from Yale University Radio WYBCX Yale University, January 28, 2014.
- Vicki DaSilva Shines The Light PDN.edu, September, 2013.
- Making Her Mark with Light Lehigh Valley Style, April, 2013.
- Honorable Mention for Night Photography Pro, 2012 International Photography Awards, http://photoawards.com/en/Pages/Gallery/zoomwin.php?eid=8-47814-12&uid=&code=Night%20Photography
- Vicki DaSilva Takes Over Times Square LightPainting Photography, June 18, 2012.
- Web Sites Illuminate Unknown Artists The New York Times, June 17, 2012.
- Vicki DaSilva Lenscratch, July 14, 2011.
- The Sounds You See Reverberating by Dominick Lombardi, Culture Catch, June 30, 2011.
- Vicki DaSilva’s REVERB Jim On Light, June 28, 2011.
- Reverb by Vicki DaSilva FRAME Magazine, June 26, 2011.
- Vicki DaSilva Honors AIG Jim On Light, April 14, 2009.
- Vicki DaSilva’s Light Art Jim On Light, April 1, 2009.
