= Vitali Pugin =

Russian footballer

Personal information
- Full name: Vitali Vladimirovich Pugin
- Date of birth: 19 December 1978 (age 47)
- Place of birth: Ivanovo, Russian SFSR
- Height: 1.89 m (6 ft 2 1/2 in)
- Position: Defender

Senior career*
Years	Team	Apps	(Gls)
1998–2003	FC Spartak-Telekom Shuya	189	(6)
2004–2007	FC Tekstilshchik-Telekom Ivanovo	175	(7)
2008–2009	FC Spartak Kostroma	63	(10)
2010–2014	FC Tekstilshchik Ivanovo	90	(7)
- * Club domestic league appearances and goals

Vitali Vladimirovich Pugin (Russian: Виталий Владимирович Пугин; born 19 December 1978) is a former Russian professional football player.

== Club career ==
He played in the Russian Football National League for FC Tekstilshchik-Telekom Ivanovo in 2007.
