= Women in architecture =

Overview of women architects

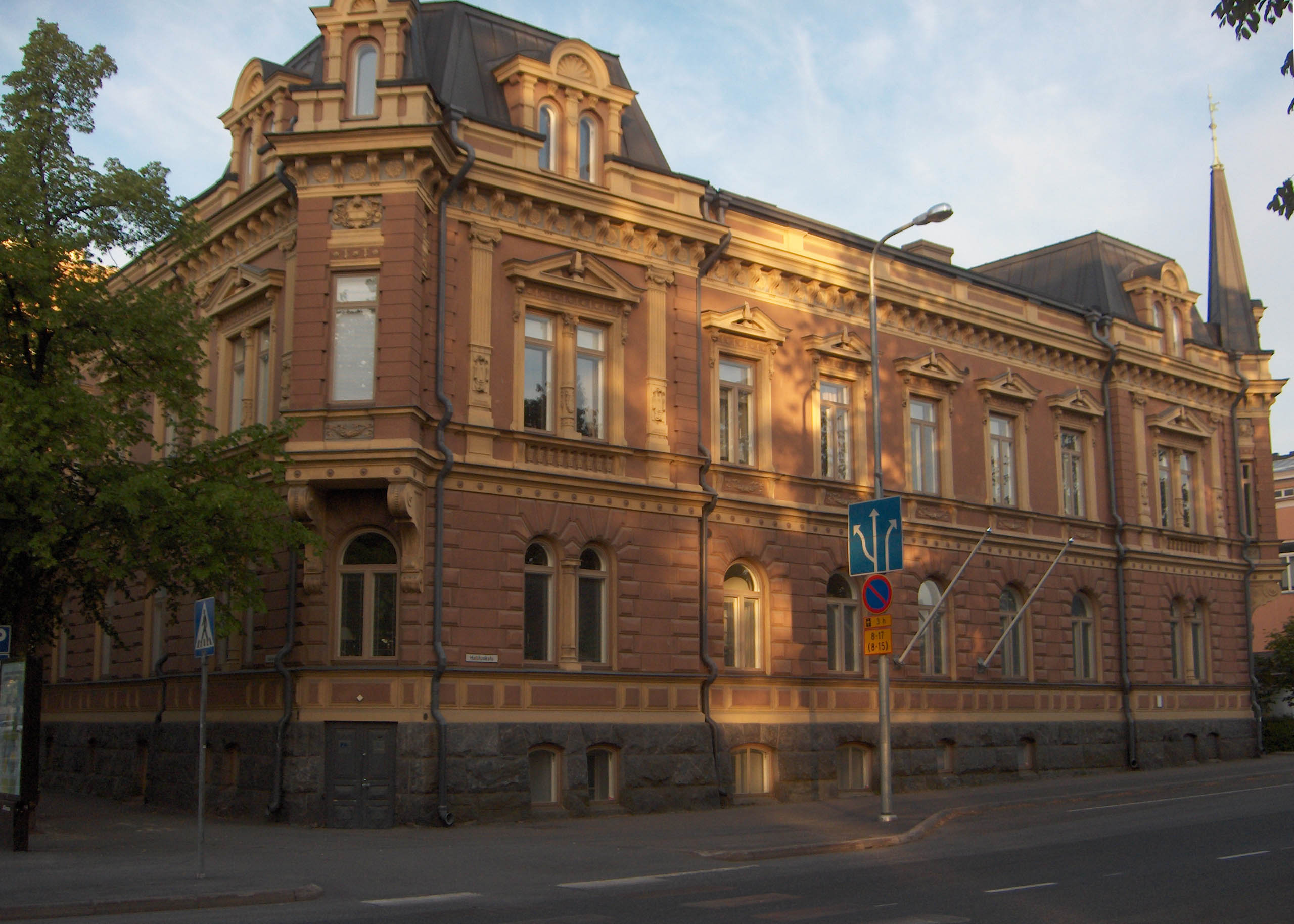
Signe Hornborg: Signelinna (1892) in Pori, Finland, possibly the first building designed by a credentialed female architect

Women in architecture have been documented for many centuries, as professional, non-licensed, (or amateur) practitioners, educators and clients. Since architecture became organized as a profession in 1857, the number of women in architecture has been low. At the end of the 19th century, starting in Finland, certain schools of architecture in Europe began to admit women to their programmes of study. In 1980 M. Rosaria Piomelli, born in Italy, became the first woman to hold a deanship of a school of architecture in the United States, as Dean of the City College of New York School of Architecture. As of the 21st century, women have begun to achieve wider recognition within the profession, however, the percentage receiving awards for their work remains low. As of 2023, 11.5% of Pritzker Prize Laureates have been female.

== Early examples ==
Two European women stand out as early examples of women playing an important part in architecture, designing or defining the development of buildings under construction. In France, Katherine Briçonnet (c. 1494–1526) was influential in designing the Château de Chenonceau in the Loire Valley, supervising the construction work between 1513 and 1521 and taking important architectural decisions while her husband was away fighting in the Italian wars. In Italy, Plautilla Bricci (1616–1690) worked with her brother, Basilio, and alone on chapels and palaces near Rome.

In Britain, there is evidence that Lady Elizabeth Wilbraham (1632–1705) studied the work of the Dutch architect Pieter Post as well as that of Palladio in Veneto, Italy, and the Stadtresidenz at Landshut, Germany. She has been put forward as the architect of Wotton House in Buckinghamshire and of many other buildings. It has also been suggested that she tutored Sir Christopher Wren. Wilbraham had to use male architects to supervise the construction work. There is now much research including that by John Millar to show she may have designed up to 400 buildings including 18 London churches previously attributed to her pupil Sir Christopher Wren.

Towards the end of the 18th century, another Englishwoman, Mary Townley (1753–1839), tutored by the artist Sir Joshua Reynolds, designed several buildings in Ramsgate in south-eastern England including Townley House which is considered to be an architectural gem. Sara Losh (1785–1853) was an English woman and landowner of Wreay. She has been described as a lost Romantic genius, antiquarian, architect and visionary. Her main work is St Mary's Church (Wreay), Cumbria, but she also constructed various associated buildings and monuments.

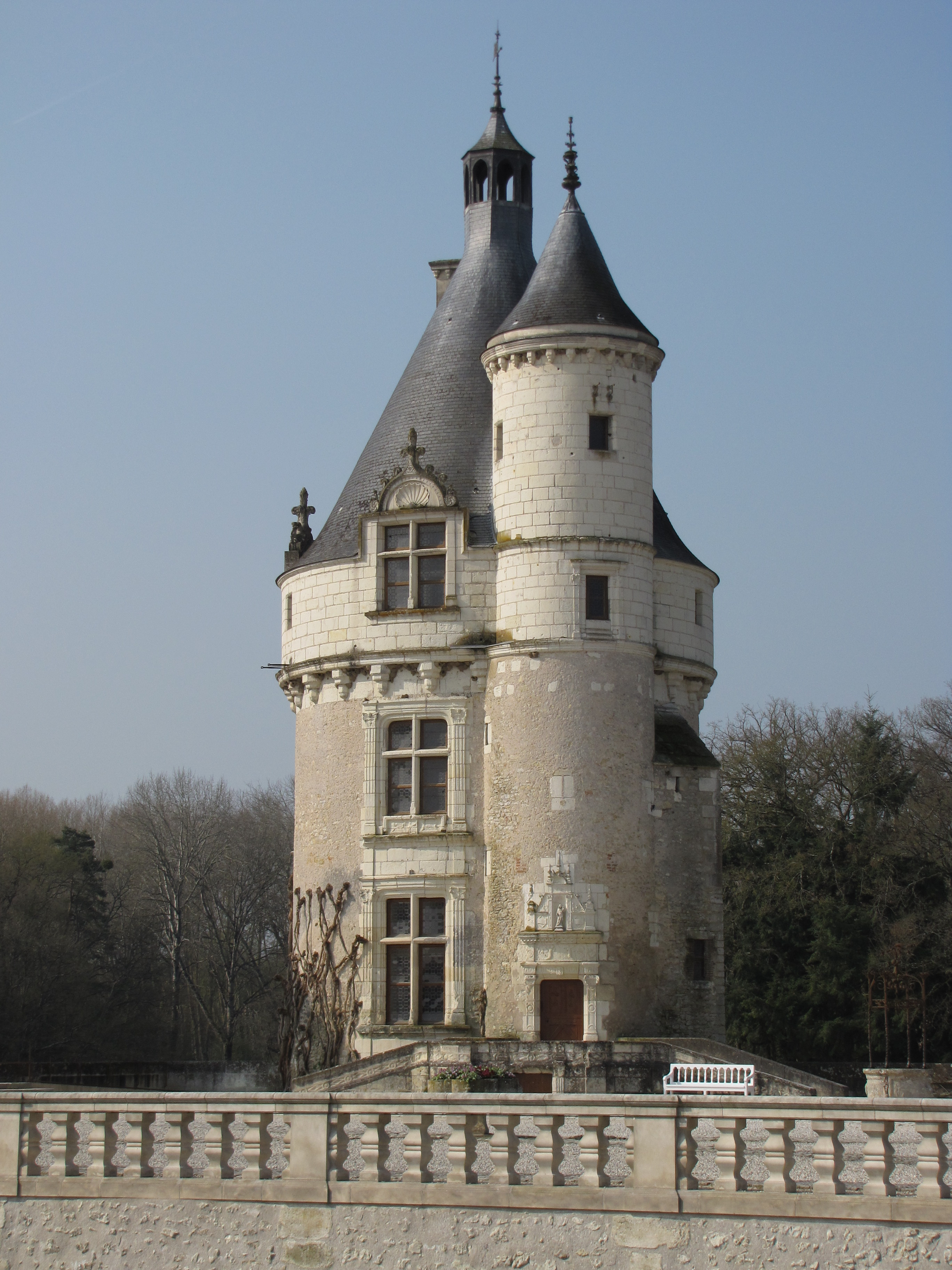
Katherine Briçonnet: Chenonceau tower (1521)

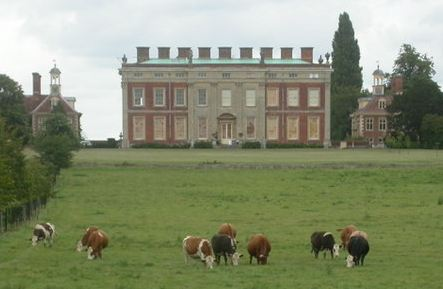
Wotton House, Buckinghamshire (1714), possibly designed by Elizabeth Wilbraham

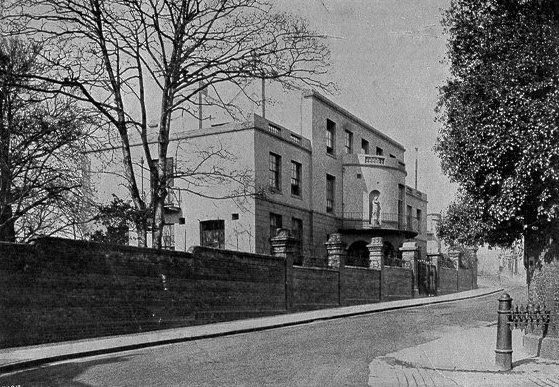
Mary Townley: Townley House, Ramsgate (1780)

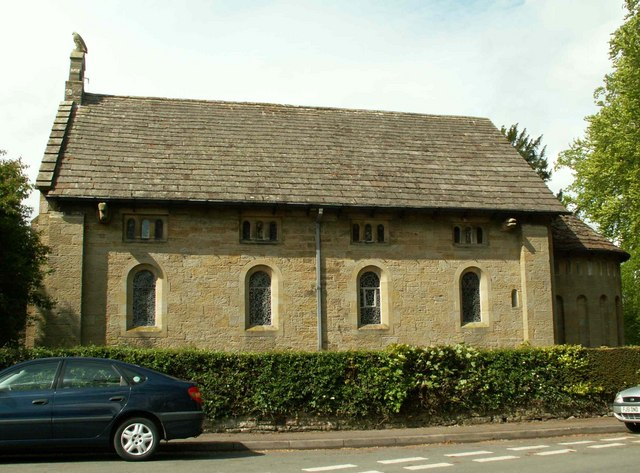
Sara Losh: St Mary's Church, Wreay (1842)

== Modern pioneers ==
Yet another Englishwoman, Sophy Gray (1814–1871), wife of Robert Gray who became bishop of Cape Town in 1847 assisted in helping her husband with his administrative and social obligations but above all by designing at least 35 of the South African Anglican churches completed between 1848 and 1880, all in the Gothic Revival style in which she showed strong interest.

The daughter of a French-Canadian carriage maker, Mother Joseph Pariseau (1823–1902) was not just one of the very earliest female architects in North America but a pioneer in the architecture of the north-western United States. In 1856, together with four sisters from Montreal, she moved to Vancouver, Washington, where she designed eleven hospitals, seven academies, five schools for Native American children, and two orphanages in an area encompassing today's Washington state, northern Oregon, Idaho, and Montana.

Louise Blanchard Bethune (1856–1913) from Waterloo, New York, was the first American woman known to have worked as a professional architect. In 1876, she took a job working as a draftsman in the office of Richard A. Waite and F.W. Caulkings in Buffalo, New York, where she worked for five years, demonstrating she could hold her own in what was a masculine profession. In 1881, she opened an independent office partnered with her husband Robert Bethune in Buffalo, earning herself the title as the nation's first professional female architect. She was named the first female associate of the American Institute of Architects (A.I.A.) in 1888 and in 1889, she became its first female fellow.

Minerva Parker Nichols (1862–1949) was the first American women to work as a professional architect without a male partner. She practiced in the Philadelphia area in the 1880s and 1890s. She graduated from the Philadelphia Normal Art School in 1882 and then completed a two-year course in architectural drawing at the Franklin Institute Drawing School in 1886. Following graduation, she joined the architectural firm of Edwin W. Thorne, taking over his office when he departed in 1889, making Parker Nichols the first independently practicing female architect in the United States. She also completed a certificate at the Pennsylvania Museum and School of Industrial Arts in 1889. Between 1888 and 1893, Parker Nichols had over sixty commissions, which were primarily dwellings but also included two spaghetti factories, the Philadelphia New Century Club in 1891, the Queen Isabella Pavilion for the Columbian Exposition Committee, and the Wilmington, Delaware New Century Club in 1893. In 1894, she designed a building for the Browne & Nichols School in Cambridge, Massachusetts. From 1891 to 1895, she taught architecture and historic ornament at the Philadelphia School of Design for Women, now Moore College of Art and Design. She closed her formal practice in Philadelphia in 1896 when she moved to Brooklyn with her husband, but she continued to design buildings throughout her life.

Marion Mahony Griffin (née Marion Lucy Mahony; February 14, 1871 – August 10, 1961) was an American architect and artist. She was one of the first licensed female architects in the world, and is considered an original member of the Prairie School. She studied architecture and graduated from the Massachusetts Institute of Technology (M.I.T.) in 1894. She was the second woman to do so, after Sophia Hayden the designer of the Woman's building at the 1893 Chicago World's Columbian Exposition. Her work in the United States developed and expanded the American Prairie School, and her work in India and Australia reflected Prairie School ideals of indigenous landscape and materials in the newly formed democracies. The scholar Debora Wood stated that Griffin "did the drawings people think of when they think of Frank Lloyd Wright (one of her collaborating architects)."

Julia Morgan (1872–1957) was an American architect and engineer. She designed more than 700 buildings in California during a long and prolific career. She is best known for her work on Hearst Castle in San Simeon, California. Morgan was the first woman to be admitted to the architecture program at l'École nationale supérieure des Beaux-Arts in Paris and the first female architect licensed in California. She designed many edifices for institutions serving women and girls, including a number of YWCAs and buildings for Mills College. Julia Morgan was the first woman to receive American Institute of Architects’ highest award, the AIA Gold Medal, posthumously in 2014. (See separate Wikipedia entry for Julia Morgan for sources.)

Another early practicing architect in the United States was Emily Williams (1869–1942) from northern California. In 1901, together with her friend Lillian Palmer, she moved to San Francisco where she studied drafting at the California High School of Mechanical Arts. Encouraged by Palmer, she went on to build a number of cottages and houses in the area, including a family home on 1037 Broadway in San Francisco, now a listed building.

Theodate Pope Riddle (1868–1946) grew up in a well-to-do background in Farmington, Connecticut, where she hired faculty members to tutor her in architecture. Her early designs, such as that for Hill-Stead (1901), were translated into working drawings by the firm of McKim, Mead and White, providing her with an apprenticeship in architecture. She was the first woman to become a licensed architect in both New York and Connecticut and in 1926 was appointed to the AIA College of Fellows.

A notable pioneer of the early days was Josephine Wright Chapman (1867–1943). Chapman received no formal education in architecture but went on design a number of buildings before setting up her own firm. The architect of Tuckerman Hall in Worcester, Massachusetts, she is considered to be one of America's earliest and most successful female architects.

Virginia Andreescu Haret (1894–1962) was the first Romanian woman to graduate with a degree in architecture in 1919 and the first woman to be Romanian Architectural Inspector General. She continued her studies in Italy before working at the Technical Service of the Ministry of National Education (Romania). Haret designed schools, public buildings, and private homes and represented Romania at international conferences.

Ruth Crawford Mitchell (1890–1984) an advocate for student immigrants at the University of Pittsburgh, conceived, designed and supervised the Nationality Rooms in the Cathedral of Learning.

Olive Tjaden (1904–1997) earned an architecture degree from Cornell University in 1925. She was one of the most prominent female architects in the US Northeast, and the only woman member of the American Institute of Architects for many years. An architecture building at Cornell is named in her honor.

Jane Drew (1911–1996), was an English modernist architect and town planner. The Jane Drew prize is named in her honour.

Elizabeth Wright Ingraham (1922–2013), daughter of John Lloyd Wright and granddaughter of Frank Lloyd Wright, designed approximately 150 buildings in Colorado Springs.

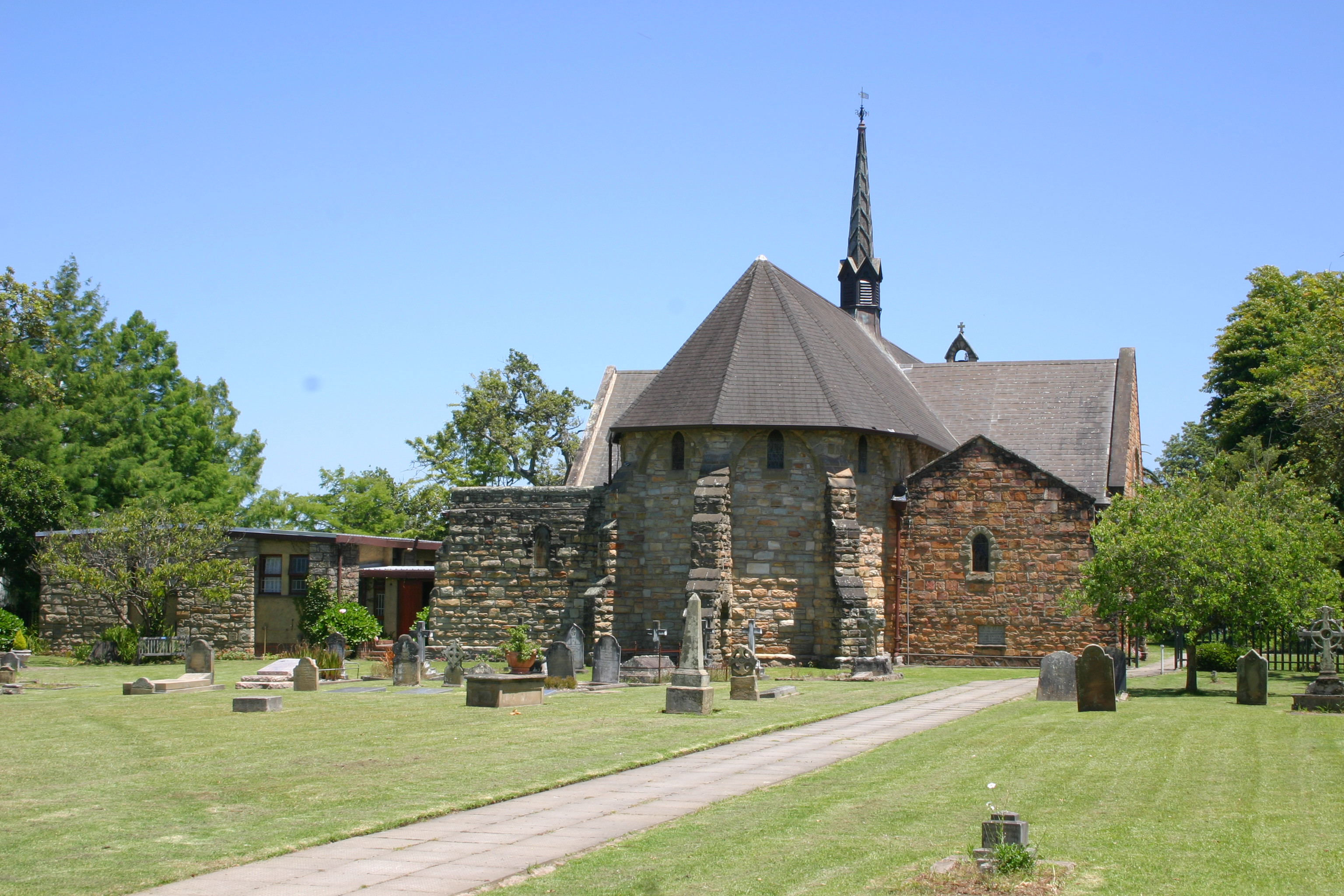
Sophy Gray: St Mark's Cathedral, George, South Africa (1849)

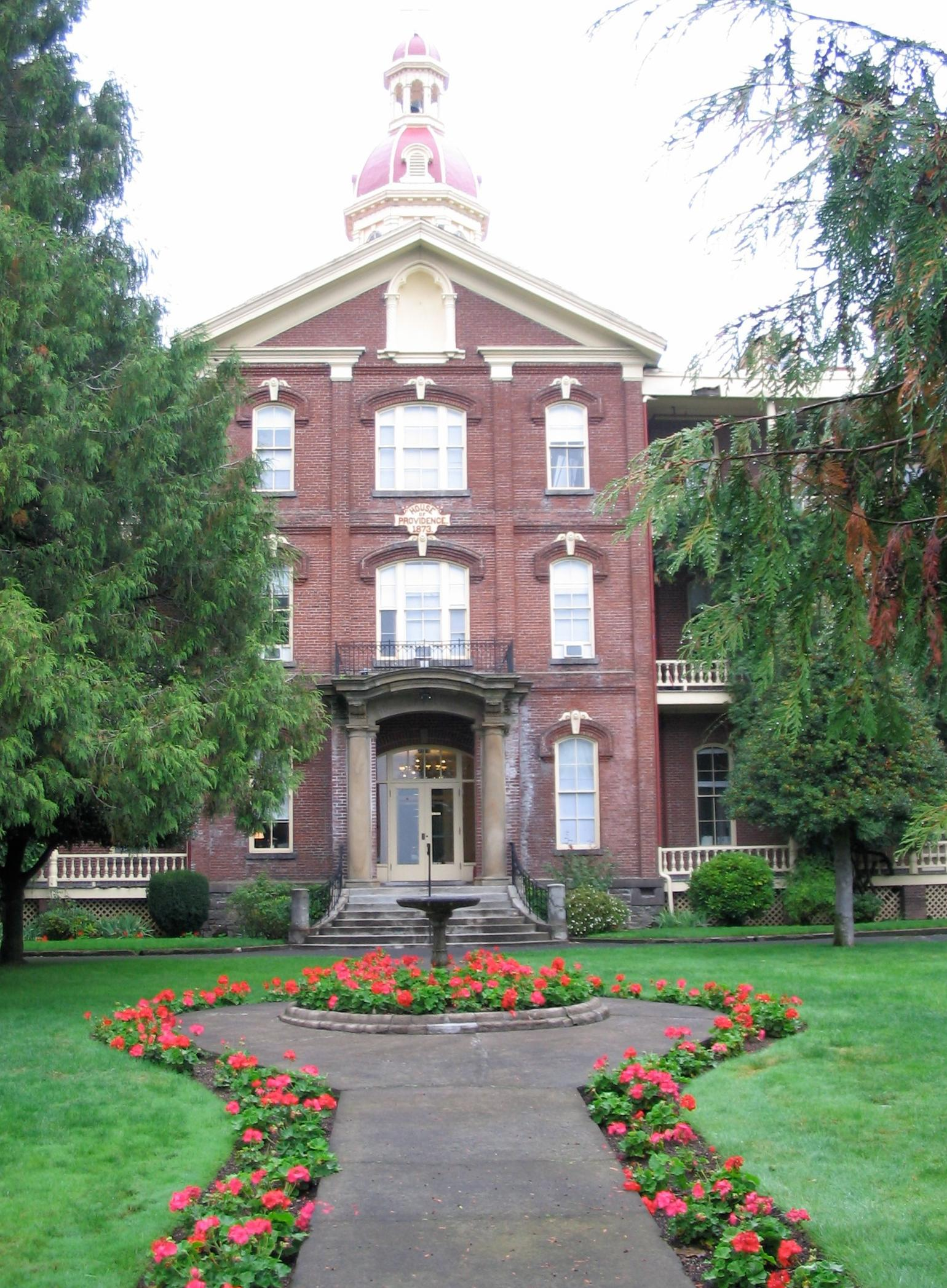
Mother Joseph Pariseau: Providence Academy, Vancouver, Washington (1873)

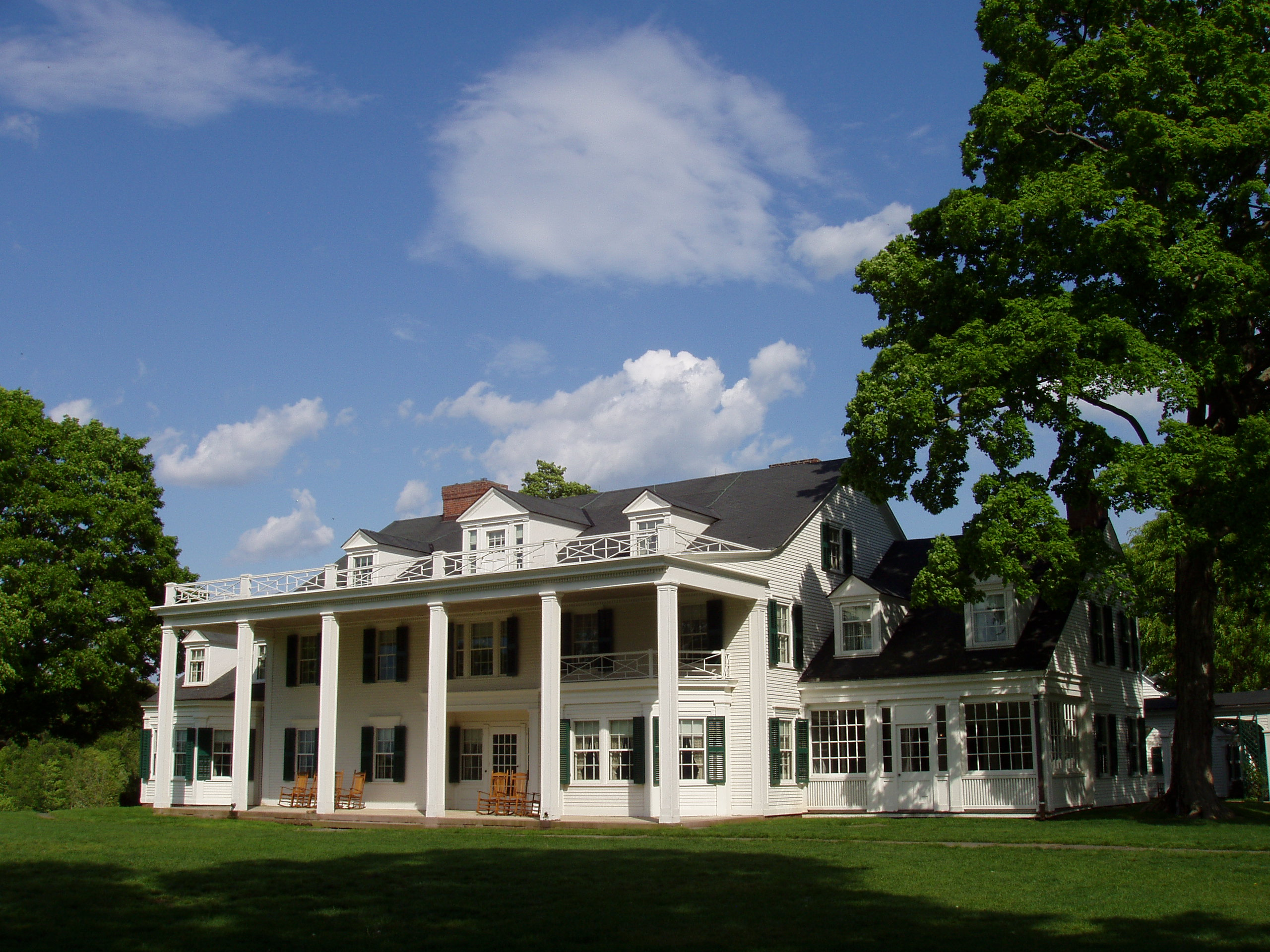
Theodate Pope Riddle: Hill-Stead, Farmington, Connecticut (1901),

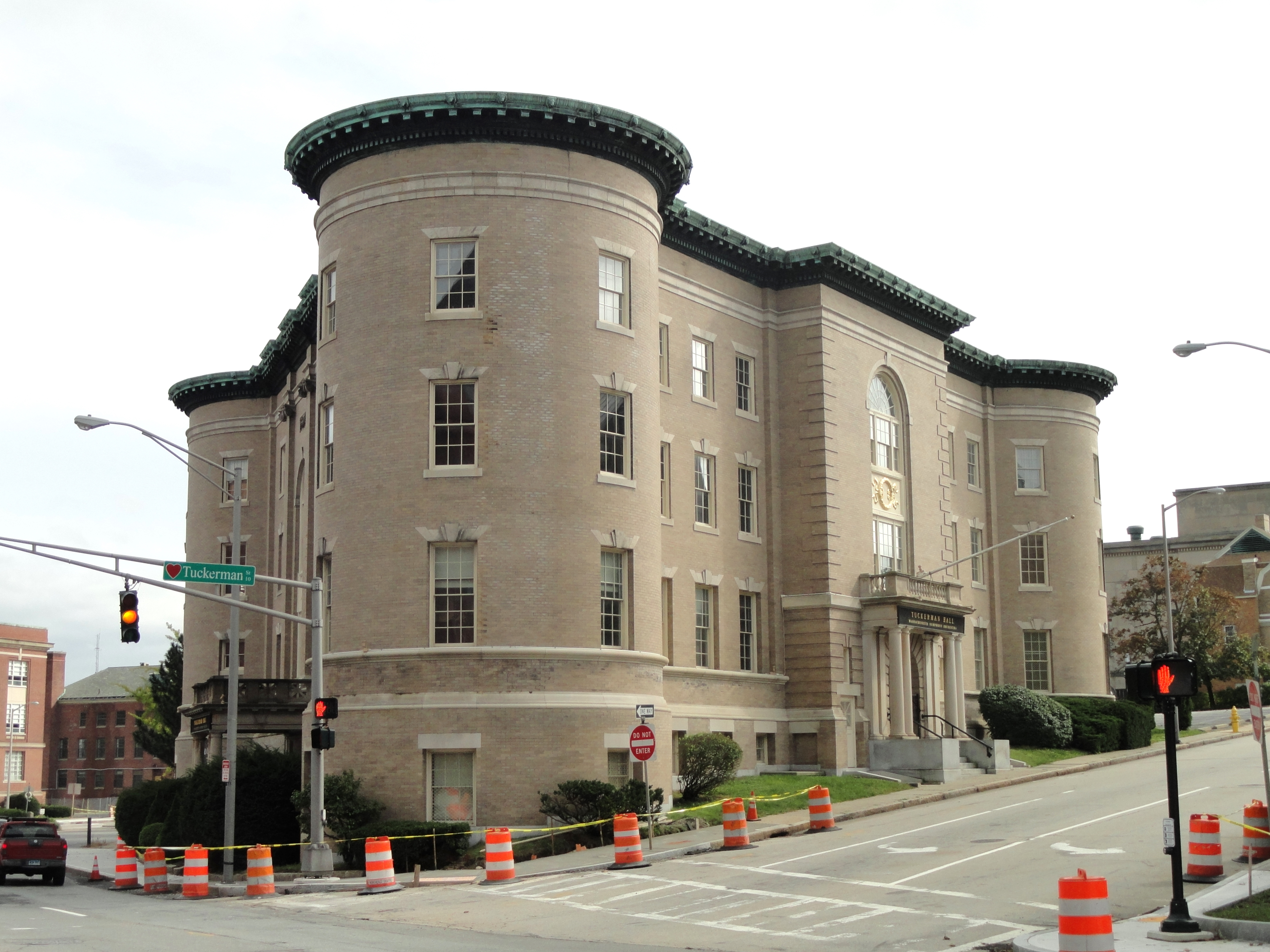
Josephine Wright Chapman, Tuckerman Hall, Worcester, Massachusetts (1902)

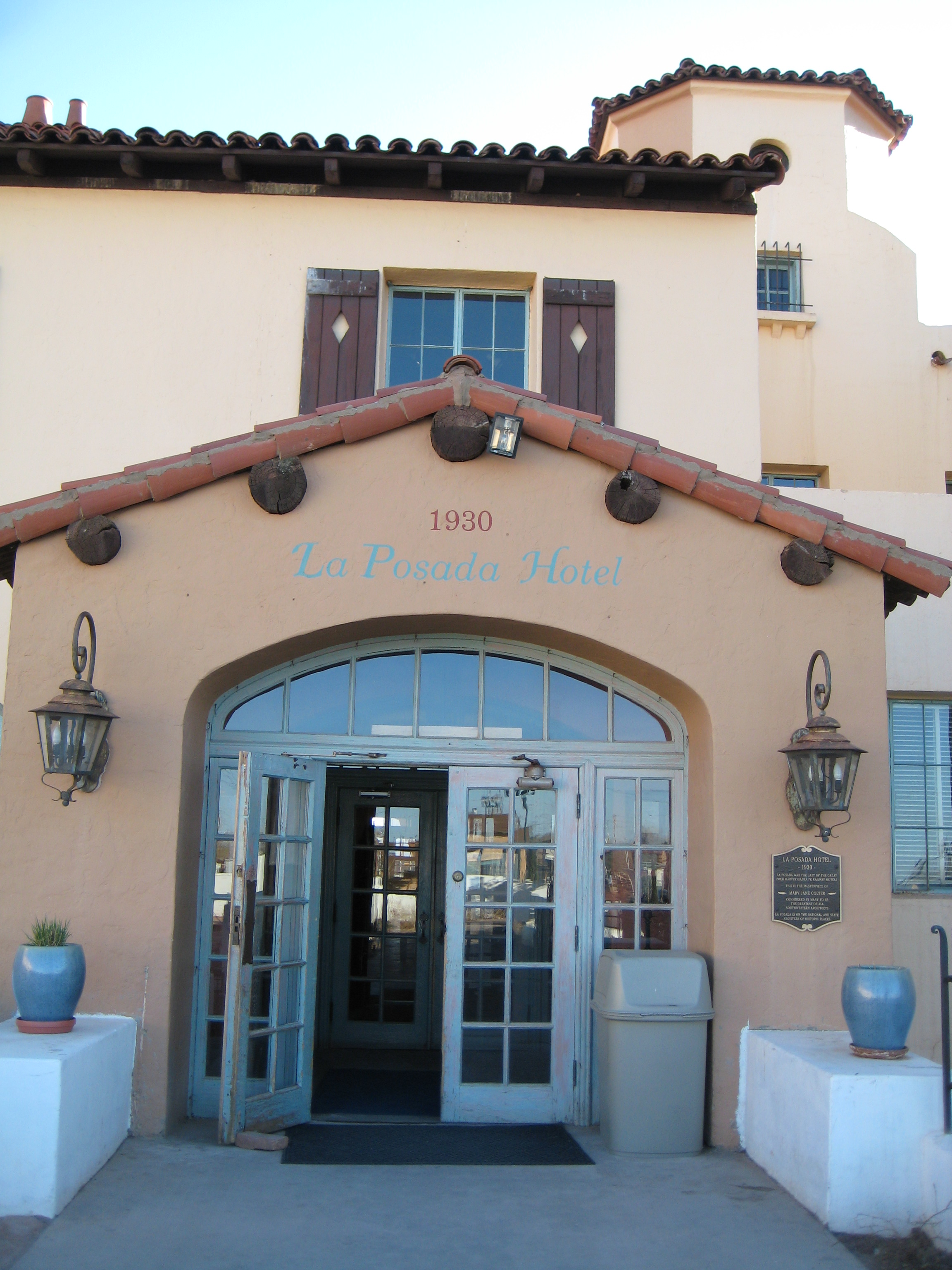
Mary Colter: La Posada Hotel, Winslow, Arizona (1930)

== First academic qualifications ==
=== Finland ===
Finland is the country in which women were first permitted to undertake architectural studies and receive academic qualifications even if they were initially given the status of special students. The earliest record belongs to Signe Hornborg (1862–1916) who attended the Helsinki Polytechnic Institute from the spring of 1888, graduating as an architect in 1890 "by special permission". She does not, however, appear to have acted as an independent architect. Other graduates in architecture at the Polytechnic Institute in the 1880s include Inez Holming, Signe Lagerborg, Bertha Enwald, Stina Östman and Wivi Lönn. Lönn (1872–1966), who attended the institute from 1893 to 1896, has the honour of being the first woman to work independently as an architect in Finland. On graduating, she immediately established her own architectural firm by receiving a commission to design the building of a Finnish-language girls' school in Tampere. She designed several significant public buildings, including more than thirty school buildings. Lönn won five architectural competitions alone, including the municipal fire-station in Tampere in 1906, an unusual design for a woman at that time. Lönn won two competitions with Armas Lindgren with him she designed the New Student House in Helsinki (1910) and the Estonia Theatre in Tallinn (1913). One of her last was the Sodankylä Geophysical Observatory, completed in 1945. Hilda Hongell (1867–1952), from Finland's Åland, became a special student at Helsinki Industrial School in 1891 at a time when only men could attend the institution. Following excellent results, she was accepted as a regular student the following year and graduated as a "master builder" in 1894. She went on to design 98 buildings in the Mariehamn district of the Åland Islands, mostly town houses and farm houses in the ornamental Swiss style. However, she did not qualify as an architect.

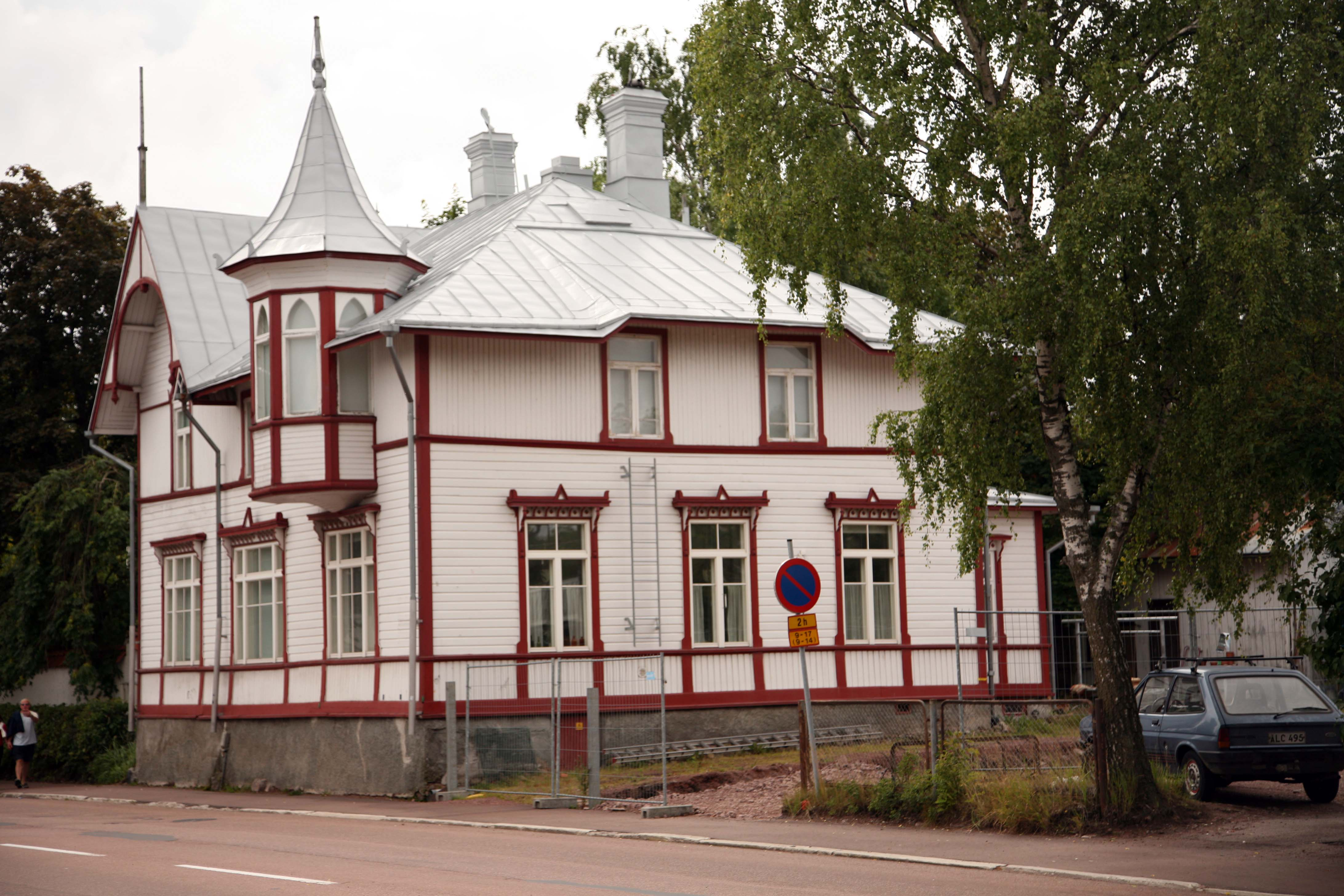
Hilda Hongell: Wooden villa in Mariehamn, Finland (1987)

=== Other early graduates ===
Fay Kellogg (1871–1918) learnt her architectural skills with a German tutor who taught her drafting, at the Pratt Institute in Brooklyn, and by working with Marcel de Monclos in his Paris atelier. She had hoped to study at the École des Beaux-Arts but as a woman was refused admission. As a result of her efforts, however, the institution later opened its doors to women wishing to study architecture. On her return to the United States, Kellogg helped design the Hall of Records in Lower Manhattan before opening a studio of her own. She went on to design hundreds of buildings in the New York area, encouraging the New York Times to describe her as "one of the most successful woman architects in America". Mary Gannon and Alice Hands were early graduates of the New York School of Applied Design for Women in 1892, and formed an architectural firm in 1894, Gannon and Hands, that focused on low-cost residential housing in New York City. Julia Morgan (1872–1957) was the first woman to receive a degree in architecture from the École des Beaux-Arts. She was initially refused admission as a woman in 1896 but reapplied and was successfully admitted in 1898. After graduating in 1901, she returned to California where she had a prolific and innovative career, blazing new paths professionally, stylistically, structurally, and aesthetically, setting high standards of excellence in the profession. Completing over 700 projects, she is especially known for her work for women's organizations and key clients, including Hearst Castle in San Simeon, considered to be one of her masterpieces. She was the first female architect licensed in California. Mary Rockwell Hook (1877–1978) from Kansas also traveled to study architecture at the École des Beaux-Arts where she suffered from discrimination against women after sitting for examinations. She was not successful in gaining admittance, and returned to America in 1906, where she did practice architecture. She designed the Pine Mountain Settlement School in Kentucky as well as a number of buildings in Kansas City where she was the first architect to incorporate the natural terrain into her designs and the first to use cast-in-place concrete walls.

Florence Mary Taylor (1879–1969) emigrated at an early age from England to Australia with her parents. She enrolled in night classes at the Sydney Technical College where she became the first woman to complete final year studies in architecture in 1904. She went on to work in the busy office of John Burcham Clamp, where she became chief draftsperson. In 1907, with Clamp's support, she applied to become the first female member of the Institute of Architects of New South Wales but faced considerable opposition, only being invited to join in 1920.

Isabel Roberts (1871–1955), born in Missouri, studied architecture in New York City at the Masqueray-Chambers Atelier, established by Emmanuel Louis Masqueray along the lines of the French École des Beaux-Arts. It was the first studio in the United States specifically established to teach the practice of architecture. Convinced of the abilities of women as architects. Masqueray was keen to include them among his students. Roberts became a member of Frank Lloyd Wright's design team before partnering with Ida Annah Ryan (1873–1950), in Orlando, Florida. Ryan was the first woman to earn a master's degree in architecture at the Massachusetts Institute of Technology although Sophia Hayden Bennett (1868–1953) had graduated in architecture there in 1890.

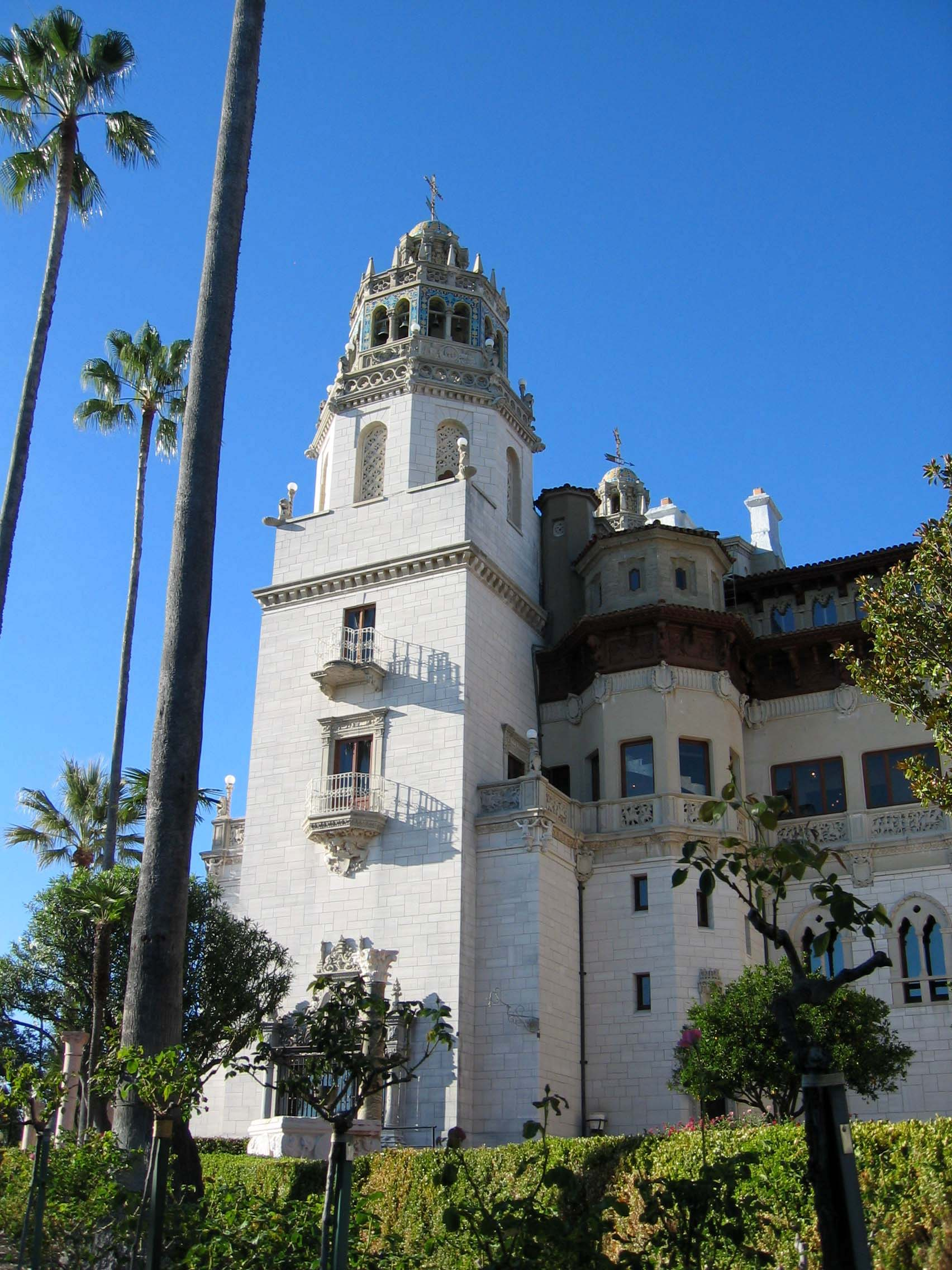
Julia Morgan: Hearst Castle, San Simeon, California (1919–1947)

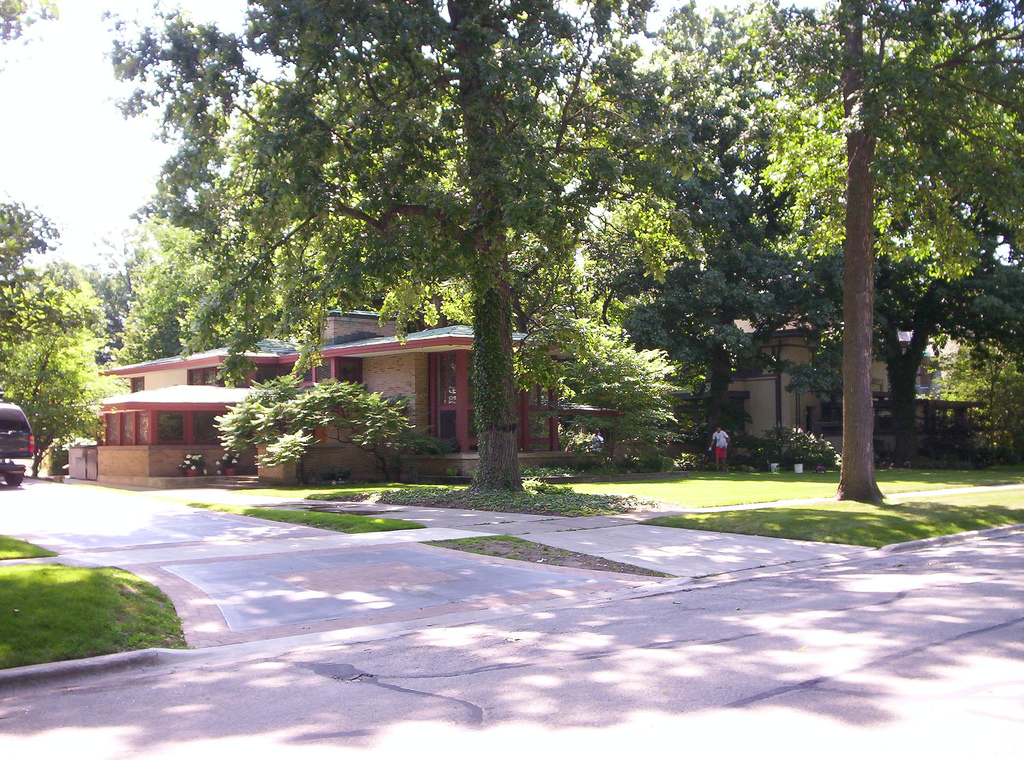
Isabel Roberts and Frank Lloyd Wright: Isabel Roberts House, River Forest, Illinois (1908)

Alice C. Malhiot (1889–1968) holds the distinction of being the very first Canadian women to graduate from an accredited School of Architecture. Malhiot achieved this accreditation from the Rhode Island School of Design in 1910, returning to her hometown of Calgary, Alberta shortly afterwards to pursue a career in architecture. Between the years of 1910–1913, Alice had been employed on and off at the busy architectural office of Lang & Major Architects. In 1911, despite her existing architectural education, Malhiot travelled to Edmonton to enrol as a student in the University of Alberta's new Department of Architecture established by Cecil S. Burgess. In 1914, Alice C. Malhiot's graduation from the program was published in local and international newspapers, celebrating the becoming of "the first women architect in Canada." However, the paper described Hill as a woman who "...will shortly become a full-fledged architect" and no record of her final graduation from the University of Alberta has since been reported.

Previously thought to be the first Canadian women to graduate from architecture school, Esther Marjorie Hill (1895–1985) completed her architecture education at the University of Toronto in 1920. Chair of the program's department, C.H.C Wright, reportedly protested Hill's graduation as Ontario's first female architect by refusing to attend the ceremony. After graduating, Esther moved across Canada to Edmonton, Alberta where the Alberta Association of Architects implemented further resistance to her participation in the profession by adding one year of work in an architect's office to its entrance requirements. Nonetheless, Hill found employment with an Edmonton architectural firm prior to enrolling at the University of Toronto for postgraduate work in urban planning. In 1936, following a momentary hiatus from architecture during the Great Depression, Hill started her own architecture practice in Victoria, British Columbia. Primarily specializing in residential architecture, her designs were recognized for their large windows, open spaces, and kitchens with generous cupboards and high countertops.

== African Developments ==
See also: Architecture of Africa

Kenya, Nigeria and Ghana, were among the first African countries to see women enter formal architectural education and professional practice, with trailblazers emerging in the 1960s and 1970s. Pioneers in the 1960s, helped dismantle gender barriers within the profession.

Joy Nwanyelimaka Nsolo (1932–1988) was the first woman to qualify as an architect in Nigeria and across West Africa, earning her credentials in 1962 after studying at the Nigerian College of Arts, Science, and Technology and the University of Birmingham. She later rose to prominence as Chief Architect in the civil service of Mid-Western Nigeria and was honoured with the Member of the Federal Republic (MFR) award in 1981.

Fatoumata Barry (born 1954) is an architect and writer from Guinea. She is known as Guinea's first woman architect, and is a former President of the Order of Architects of Guinea.

Eugenie Dorothy Hughes (1910–1987) was a British architect who established her own architectural practice in the 1940s when she moved to Kenya. She became one of the region’s earliest women to work independently in the profession. Her career helped pave the way for greater female participation in architecture across East Africa.

Alero Therese Olympio (1959–2005) was a Ghanaian architect renowned for her sustainable, community-focused approach to design. Educated in Scotland. She practised in both the UK and Ghana, becoming known for her innovative use of local materials such as laterite, timber, and stone. Her most notable project, the Kokrobitey Institute in Ghana, reflects her commitment to environmentally responsive architecture rooted in indigenous building traditions.

Rahel Shawl Zelleke (1968) is widely recognised as one of the pioneering and most prominent female architects in Ethiopia. Rahel was awarded the Aga Khan Award for Architecture in 2007 for her role as architect of record on the Royal Netherlands Embassy in Addis Ababa. She is the founder and director of Raas Architects plc.

Mariam Issoufou (1979) founded Mariam Issoufou Architects (formerly Atelier Masōmī) in Niamey, Niger’s capital. Rooted in principles of sustainability, the practice centres on forward-thinking, community-driven projects that prioritise environmentally responsive design. A notable building includes converting a former mosque into a library and community centre with Iranian architect Yasaman Esmaili in the rural village of Dandaji, Niger. The firm’s first office building is nearing completion, with construction of the Niamey Cultural Center.

Olamide Udoma-Ejorh is a key figure in architecture and urbanism. Director of Lagos Urban Development Initiative (LUDI) in Nigeria, the company has played a leading role in promoting better governance for the people of Lagos, working toward a city that is more liveable and socially inclusive for all its residents.

== European developments ==
After Finland, several other European countries allowed women to study architecture. In Norway, the first female architect was Lilla Hansen (1872–1962) who studied at the Royal Drafting School (Den Kongelige Tegneskole) in Kristiania (1894) and served architectural apprenticeships in Brussels, Kristiania and Copenhagen. She established her own practice in 1912 and gained immediate success with Heftyeterrassen, a Neo-baroque residential complex in Oslo. She went on to design a number of large villas as well as student accommodation for women.

The first woman to run an architecture practice in Germany was Emilie Winkelmann (1875–1951). She studied architecture as a guest student registered as Student Emil at the College of Technology in Hannover (1902–1908) but was refused a diploma as women were not entitled to the qualification until 1909. Working from her practice in Berlin where she employed a staff of 15, she completed some 30 villas before the outbreak of war. One of her most notable buildings is the Tribüne theatre in Charlottenburg-Wilmersdorf, originally a girls school.

The first woman to become an engineer in Germany was Serbian architect Jovanka Bončić-Katerinić. She received her degree from the Technical University of Darmstadt in 1913.

In Serbia, Jelisaveta Načić (1878–1955) studied architecture at the University of Belgrade at a time when it was felt that women should not enter the profession. At the age of 22, she was the first woman to graduate from the Faculty of Engineering. As a woman, she was unable to obtain the ministerial post she sought but gained employment with the Municipality of Belgrade where she became chief architect. Among her notable achievements are the well-proportioned Kralj Petar I (King Peter I) elementary school (1906) and the Moravian-styled Alexander Nevsky Church (1929), both in Belgrade. The first female architect in Serbia, she did much to inspire other women to enter the profession.

Margarete Schütte-Lihotzky (1897–2000) was the first female architect in Austria and the first woman to graduate from the Vienna Kunstgewerbeschule, now the University of Applied Arts Vienna, though she was admitted only after a letter of recommendation from an influential friend. A pioneer of social housing development in Vienna and Frankfurt, she combined design with functionality, especially in her Frankfurt Kitchen, the prototype of today's built-in kitchen.

In Switzerland, Flora Steiger-Crawford (1899–1991) was the first woman to graduate in architecture from Zurich's Federal Institute of Technology in 1923. She established her own firm with her husband Rudolf Steiger in 1924. Their first project, the Sandreuter House in Riehen (1924), is considered to be the first Modernist house in Switzerland. In 1938, she terminated her architectural activities in favour of sculpture.

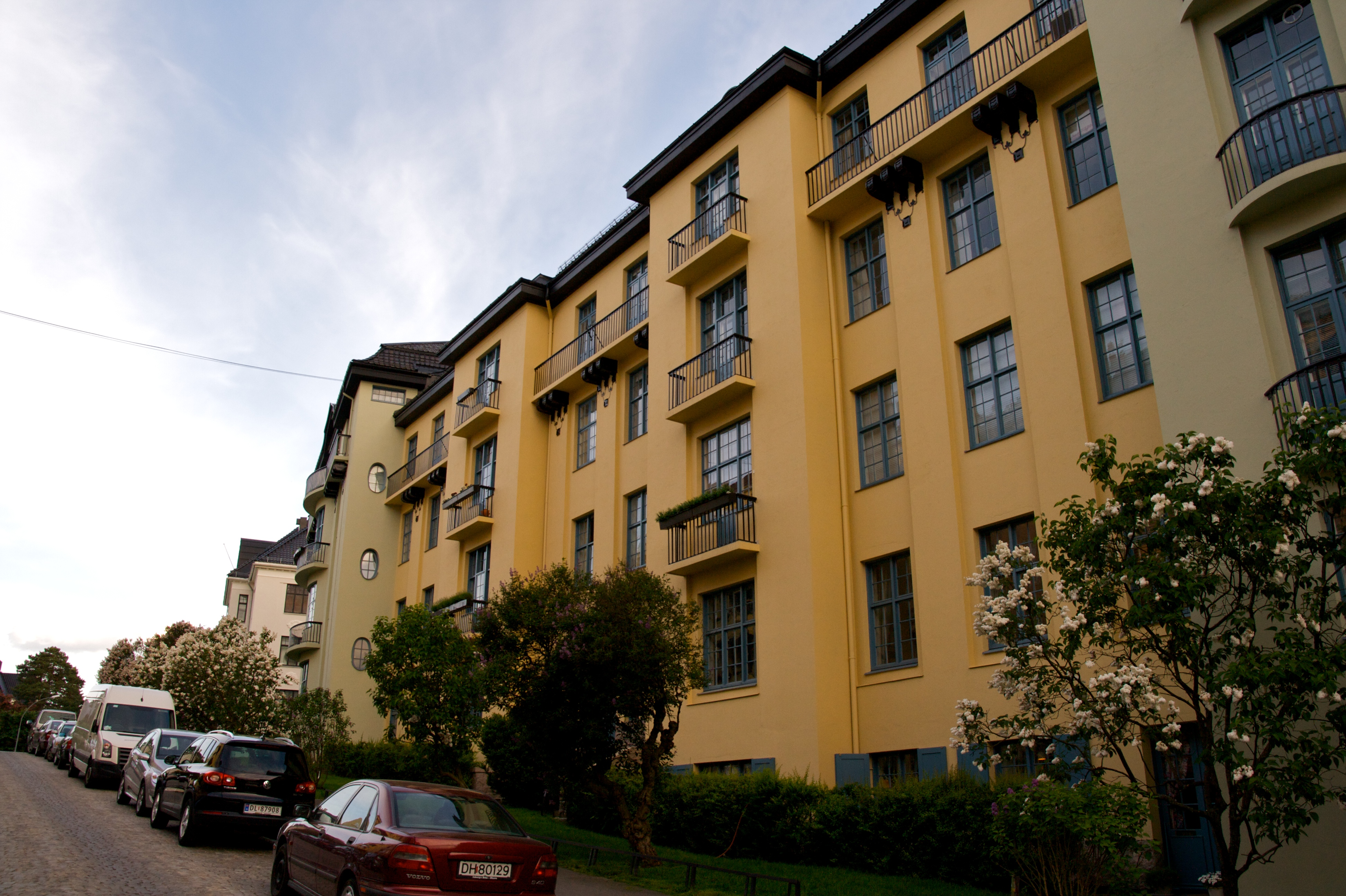
Lilla Hansen: Heftyeterrassen, Oslo (1929)

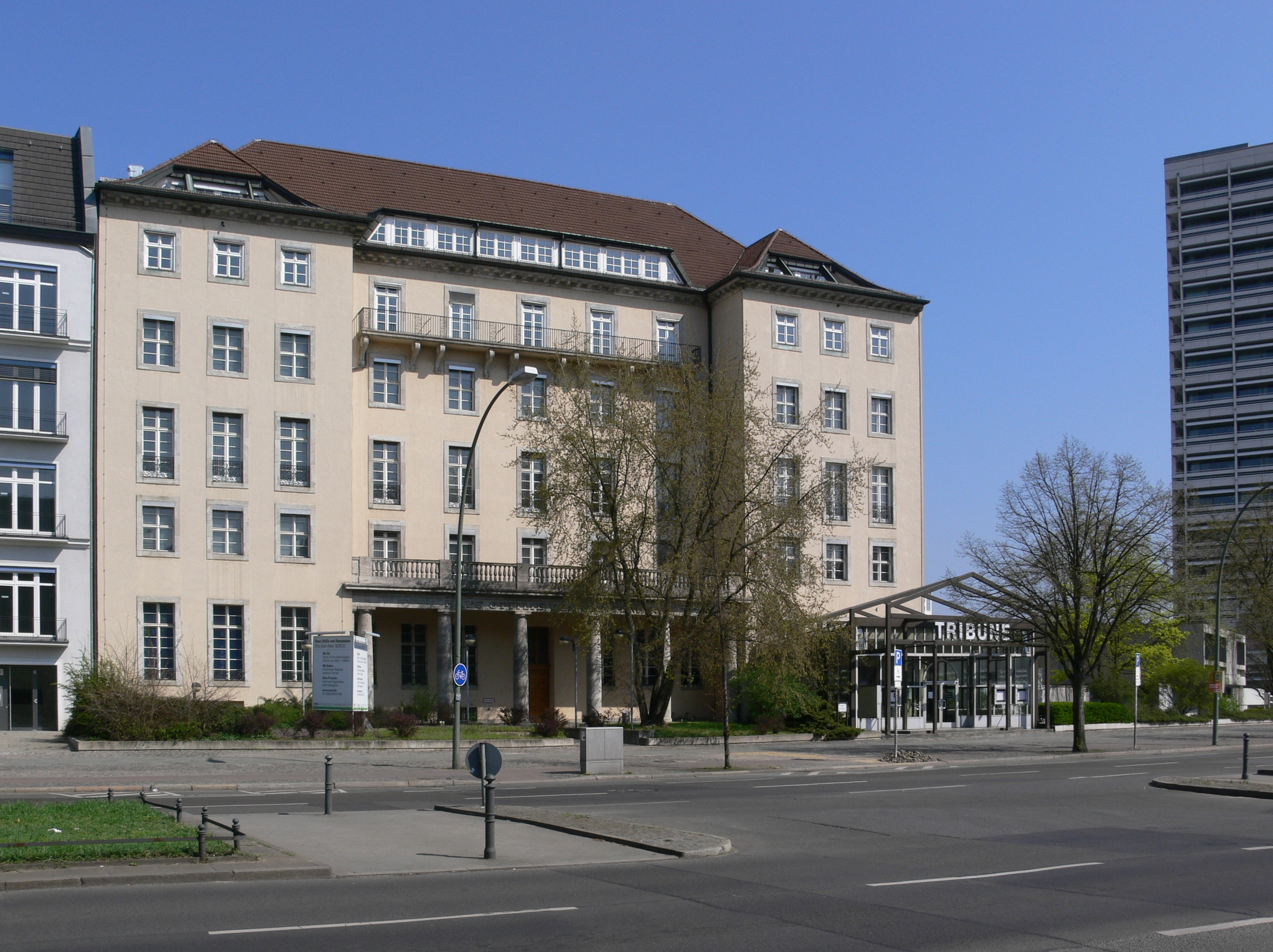
Emilie Winkelmann: Tribüne theatre, Berlin (1915)

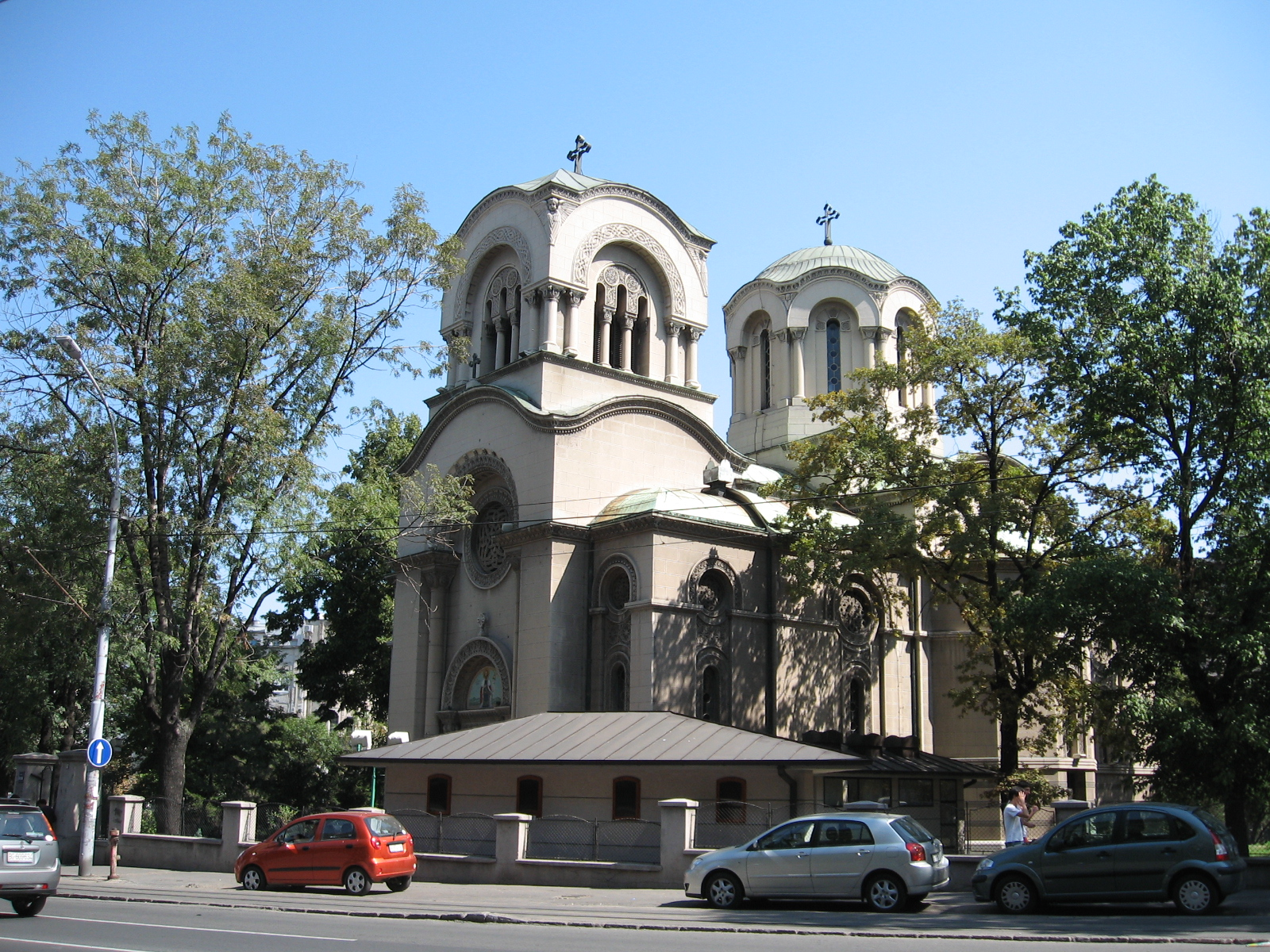
Jelisaveta Načić: Alexander Nevsky Church, Belgrade (1929)

The first woman to be admitted to Britain's Royal Institute of British Architects (RIBA) was Ethel Charles (1871–1962) in 1898. She and her sister Bessie were both trained as architects under the partnership of Ernest George and Harold Peto. In 1893, they both attempted to continue their training by attending the Architectural Association School of Architecture but were refused entry. Ethel completed part of the course offered by the Bartlett School of Architecture, receiving distinctions. As a woman, though, she was unable to obtain large-scale commissions and was forced to concentrate on modest housing projects such as labourers' cottages.

Another early female architect in Britain was Edith Hughes (1888–1971), a Scot, who after attending lectures on art and architecture at the Sorbonne, studied at Gray's School of Art, Aberdeen, where she received a diploma in architecture in 1914. In addition to teaching at the Glasgow School of Art, she established her own practice in 1920, specializing in kitchen design. The first woman to design a major public building in Britain was Elisabeth Scott (1898–1972) who was the architect behind the Shakespeare Memorial Theatre at Stratford-upon-Avon completed in 1932. Gertrude Leverkus, though not the first to be admitted to the RIBA in 1922, claimed to have been the first woman to have made a lifelong career as a practicing architect having initially been a pupil, and later a partner, of Horace Field. Gillian Harrison (1898–1974) was one of the first four Architectural Association students, and in 1931 became the first woman Fellow of the Royal Institute of British Architects. In 1981, Matrix Feminist Design Co-Operative was established in London as one of the first architectural organisations globally to apply a feminist perspective to architecture and the built environment, actively challenging patriarchal spatial structures. Matrix advanced its aims through built projects, critical theory, commissioned research, and publications, most notably Making Space: Women and the Man-made Environment, published in 1984.

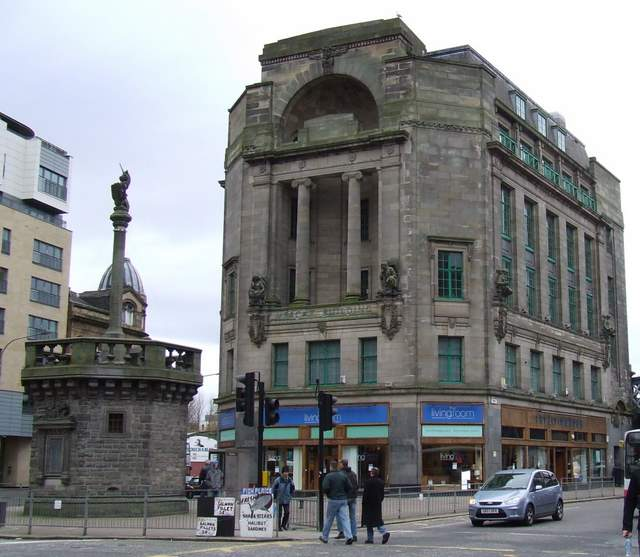
Edith Hughes: Glasgow Mercat Cross (left) (1930)

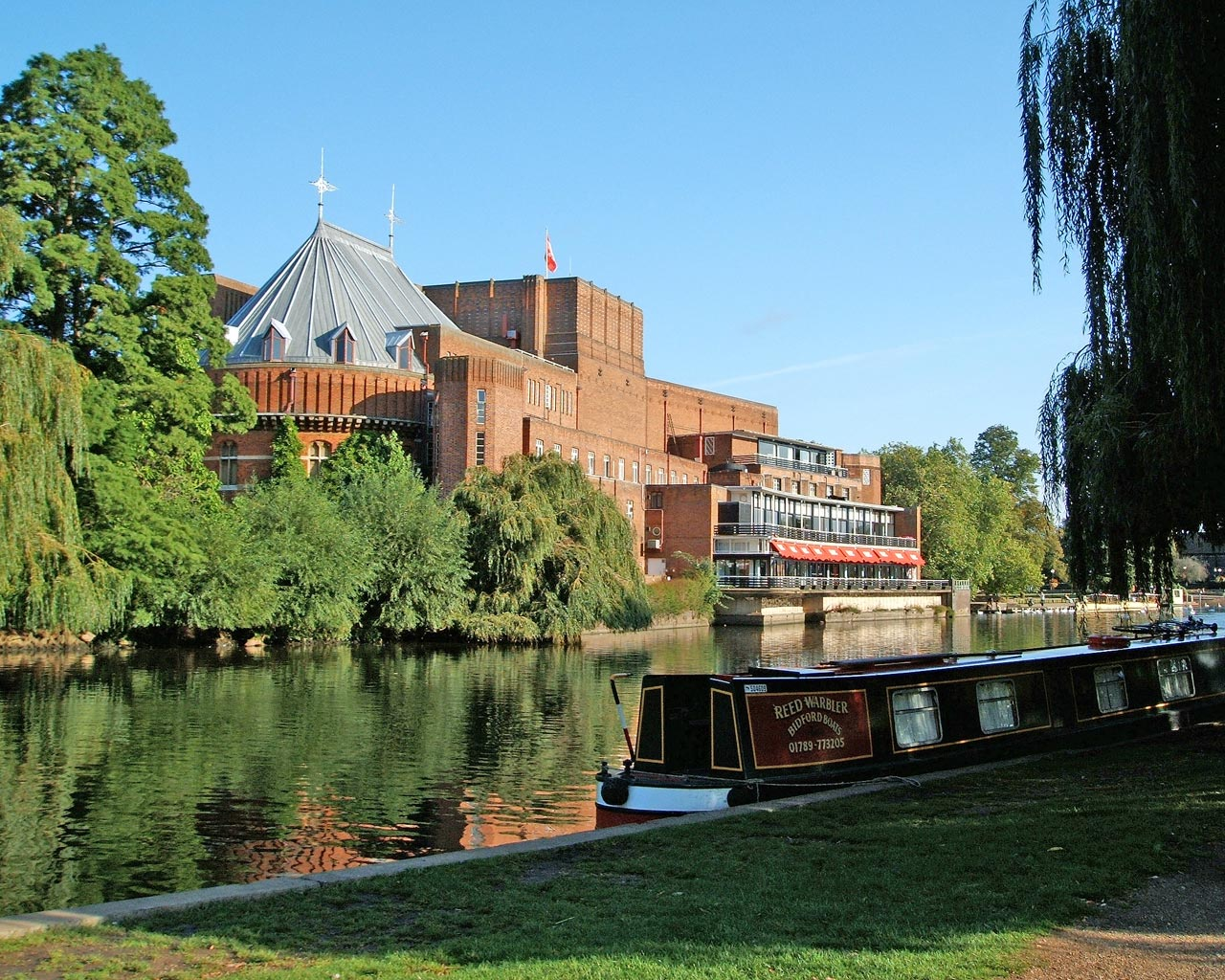
Elisabeth Scott: Shakespeare Memorial Theatre, Stratford-upon-Avon (1932)

== Asia Developments ==
Asian women architects are increasingly receiving recognition and winning prestigious awards for their projects such as the Aga Khan Award for Architecture, RIBA Royal Gold Medal, and Pritzker Prize. Women began entering architectural education and practice in many Asian countries in the mid-20th century, often overcoming social and cultural barriers.

Lin Huiyin (1904–1955) was a pioneering Chinese architect, writer, and cultural scholar, often recognised as the first female architect in modern China. She studied literature at Nanjing University and later architecture at the University of Pennsylvania. Huiyin played a key role in documenting and preserving China’s architectural heritage like The Monument to the People's Heroes (Tiananmen Square) and surveyed 2,738 structures in 190 counties.

Minnette de Silva (1918–1998) was Sri Lanka’s first female architect and a pioneering figure in modern South Asian architecture. She trained in Mumbai at Mistri and Bhedwar, an institution led in part by Perin Mistri, one of India’s earliest female practicing architects. De Silva became the first Asian woman to be elected an associate of the Royal Institute of British Architects (RIBA). Her notable projects include the Kandyan Art Association building (1982–84), the Ceylon Match Factory in Colombo, and various private residences that harmonise indoor and outdoor spaces. De Silva aimed to create architecture suited to non-Western contexts and was a founding member of the Architects’ Association of Sri Lanka. She also worked internationally, including collaborative projects in India.

Yasmeen Lari (1941) is Pakistan’s first female architect and a celebrated humanitarian. She moved from designing iconic Karachi landmarks, such as PSO House, to championing low-carbon, self-built, and eco-friendly housing for marginalised communities. In 1980, she founded the Heritage Foundation of Pakistan and was awarded the 2023 RIBA Royal Gold Medal.

Kazuyo Sejima (1956) is a Japanese architect and director of her own practice, Kazuyo Sejima & Associates. In 1995, she co-founded the Tokyo-based firm SANAA with Ryue Nishizawa. In 2010, Sejima became only the second woman to receive the Pritzker Architecture Prize, which she was awarded jointly with Nishizawa, and they were just the second partnership ever honoured with this distinction.

Marina Tabassum (1968) is a Bangladeshi architect and principal of Marina Tabassum Architects. She has won the Aga Khan Award for Architecture twice, first in 2016 for the Bait-ur-Rouf Mosque in Dhaka and again in 2025 for Khudi Bari in various locations across Bangladesh. In 2025, she was also selected to design the Serpentine Pavilion in London, an annual commission by the Serpentine Galleries.

== Middle East Developments ==
Dame Zaha Hadid (1950–2016) is celebrated as the most influential female architect from the Middle East. Born in Baghdad, Iraq, she became a British-Iraqi architect renowned as the "Queen of the Curve" for her bold, neofuturistic designs that transformed contemporary architecture.

Sumaya Dabbagh, founder of Dabbagh Architects in Dubai, was among the first female architects in the UAE to design a mosque, the Mosque of the Late Mohamed Abdulkhaliq Gargash. This featured a minimalist approach that departs from traditional mosque designs. This pared-down aesthetic is also evident in her ongoing work expanding Abu Dhabi’s Al Ain Museum, situated on a historic heritage site adjacent to a fort and oasis.

Yasaman Esmaili is an Iranian architect and educator based in Tehran. In 2017, she established Studio Chahar, a research-driven, collaborative architectural design studio focused on community-based projects. Her work in Afghanistan, Niger, and Iran addresses issues of marginalisation, lost heritage, and education. Studio Chahar’s collaborative efforts have earned multiple accolades, including a Regional Gold and a Global Silver LafargeHolcim Award. In 2020, Yasaman was recognised as a Rising Star with the Tamayouz Award of Excellence.

Lina Ghotmeh (born 1980) is a distinguished Lebanese-French architect based in Paris, known for her "Archaeology of the Future" approach, which integrates historical context, sustainability, and the natural environment. She is the founder of Lina Ghotmeh—Architecture and has achieved international recognition for projects such as the Estonian National Museum, Stone Garden in Beirut, and the 2023 Serpentine Pavilion.

Suad Amiry (1951) is a Palestinian author and architect living in Ramallah. Honored with the 2025 Great Arab Minds Award in the Architecture and Design category. As founder and director of the Riwaq, Centre for Architectural Conservation. Amiry was recognised for her decades-long efforts in documenting, preserving, and repurposing Palestinian architectural heritage, employing conservation practices that connect historic buildings with the needs of contemporary communities.

== Male and female professional partnerships ==
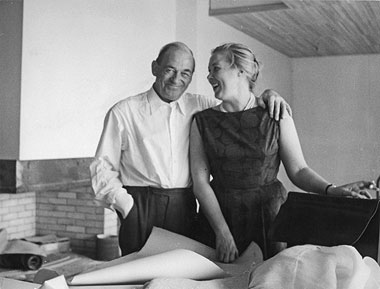
Alvar and Elissa Aalto (1950s)

A number of the more important women architects in the first half of the 20th century partnered with men, often forming husband-and-wife practices. Such partnerships began in the early years of women's involvement when some of the most successful male architects worked with women. Since the 1960s, which saw increased enrollment by women into schools of Architecture, male and female students have often met and later married; long hours working together and a shared passion have been described as "the perfect prescription for romance". A good overview of this topic is also discussed in Ann Forsyth's "In Praise of Zaha"

Male-female partnerships in architecture sometimes lead to misattribution of the work to the male partner, often because the male is better known. This can be seen as the result of an underlying discrimination or biased attitude. What has been described as the "tradition of misattribution" has remained a "secret" until recent years.

Some particularly notable male-female partnerships in architecture include:

- Aino Aalto (1894–1949) and Alvar Aalto, after qualifying as an architect in Finland in 1920, she married Alvar Aalto in 1923 and participated in the design of his earlier buildings, often contributing to the interiors as in the Villa Mairea (1937) in Noormarkku.
- Reima and Raili Pietilä, another Finnish couple, worked closely together developing their early Modernistic style. Raili Pietilä (born 1926) found two the perfect number for a design team, explaining: "We often took our work with us: for a walk, in the kitchen, and in the evenings. And when doing competitions we used to take trips, like long train journeys, because we found that changing your environment affects your thinking."
- In Denmark, Inger and Johannes Exner who married in 1952 formed a close, highly successful partnership, building or restoring churches, frequently exerting a functional as well as an aesthetic approach in their work.
- French architect and designer Charlotte Perriand (1903–1999) established a partnership with an icon of modern architecture, Le Corbusier, contributing to the development of functional living spaces, especially by designing interiors and furniture for his buildings. She later recalled how Le Corbusier insisted on strict adherence to his demanding principles: "The smallest pencil stroke had to have a point, to fulfil a need, or respond to a gesture or posture, and to be achieved at mass-production prices." After collaborating with Le Corbusier for about ten years, Perriand left his studio in 1937 to concentrate on furniture design, often working with Jean Prouvé. The Portuguese architect Maria José Marques da Silva (1914–1996) partnered with her husband David Moreira, completing a number of key buildings in the city of Porto.

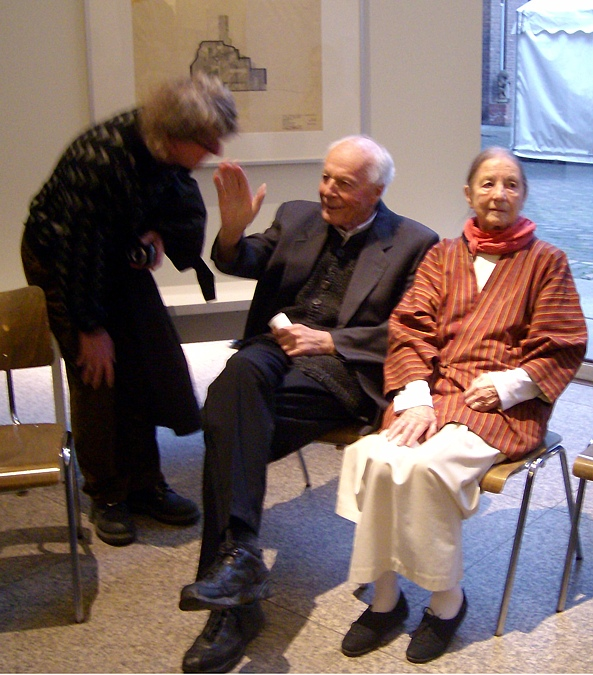
Elisabeth and Gottfried Böhm, 2009

- In Germany, Elisabeth Böhm (born 1921) frequently worked with her husband, Gottfried Böhm, designing interiors for apartment buildings and other housing developments.
- Margot Schürrmann (1924–1999) formed a lifelong partnership with her husband Joachim Schürmann. Their influence on German architecture was recognized by the Bund Deutscher Architeken who awarded them their Grand Prize 1998.
- Maria Schwarz (born 1921) is remembered for her partnership with Rudolf Schwarz who assisted in reconstructing the city of Cologne, especially its churches, after the Second World War. After her husband's death in 1961, Maria continued to run the family firm, completing many of her husband's projects in the Cologne area.
- Bernice Alexandra "Ray" Eames, furniture and interior designer, architect, artist, wife and partner of architect Charles Eames. Charles and Ray Eames designed the Eames House and other significant mid-20th century modern buildings. As well, the Eames' produced the influential Eames Lounge Chair and other modernist furniture.
- Elizabeth Close (1912–2011) had difficulty in finding employment after graduation until she followed fellow student William Close to Minneapolis. As husband and wife, they set up their own firm in 1938. In addition to designs of her own including many streamlined private homes, it was Elizabeth who ran the firm in her husband's absence during the Second World War and while he was busy constructing the University of Minnesota campus. The architectural historian Jane King Hession remarked: "By her example she inspired many women in architecture, myself included, but she didn't want to be known as a woman architect – just as an architect who happened to be a woman."

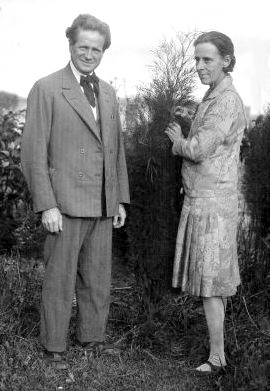
Walter Burley Griffin with Marion Mahony, Sydney, 1930

- Marion Mahony Griffin (1871–1961) from Chicago, was the first employee hired by Frank Lloyd Wright. Although Wright did not give her much recognition for her Prairie School designs, it now appears she not only contributed substantially to his studio's residential work but also did much to promote his ideas. In 1911, Marion married Walter Burley Griffin, with whom she had worked in Wright's studio. Together they set up a highly successful partnership working first in the Chicago area on a variety of projects, then in Australia on the urban planning of Canberra, and finally in India until Griffin's death in 1937. In her memoir, Mahony describes how she was indissolubly fused with her husband, emphasizing how together they championed various causes such as a library for the Indian city of Lucknow or Castlecrag, a community near Sydney that they designed.
- Also in Australia, Mary Turner Shaw (1906–1990) had found it difficult to complete her architecture studies at the University of Melbourne, and instead became an architect via articled studentship. She worked for various architectural firms in Australia (1931–1936) and the UK (1937), and traveled Europe meeting many key Modernist architects. After working for others again in Australia (1938), she formed an architectural firm, Romberg & Shaw, with the Modernist architect Frederick Romberg. The firm operated from 1939 to 1942. During that period they produced "some of the most celebrated blocks of flats in Australia", including the Yarrabee Flats, South Yarra, Victoria(1940) and the Newburn Flats, South Melbourne, Victoria in 1939. Shaw continued to practice architecture until her retirement in 1969.
- Denise Scott Brown (born 1931) and Robert Venturi met in 1960 at the University of Pennsylvania, where Scott Brown completed masters in city planning and architecture while being a faculty member. Shortly after their marriage in 1967, Scott Brown joined his Philadelphia firm Venturi and Rauch, where she became principal in charge of planning in 1969. She has since played a major role at the firm (renamed Venturi, Scott Brown and Associates in 1989) leading civic planning projects and studies, and collaborating with Venturi on the firm's larger projects. She is however resentful of the fact that she is seldom credited for her work. For example, it was her husband who was awarded the Pritzker Prize in 1991 although she explains: "We both design every inch of a building together." In 1997 she speculated: "The question of being a woman will be in the air for ever in my case. If I had not married Bob, would I have gone further or not? Who can tell? But the same question holds for him. If he had not married me, would he have gone further?" Denise Scott Brown also disclosed her feelings about this situation in a chapter of "Gender Space Architecture".
- In the UK, architect Amanda Levete (born 1955) became a director of Future Systems with her husband Jan Kaplický. In 1999 they won the Royal Institute of British Architects' (RIBA) Stirling Prize for their Media Centre at Lord's Cricket Ground. Because Kaplický neither knew or cared about cricket, Levete chose to attend the meetings with the client. Levete is credited with the ability of making Future Systems' organic forms marketable.
- Ivenue Love-Stanley and her husband William J. "Bill" Stanley III co-founded their architectural firm in 1983 after they had each (in different years) become the first African-Americans, first youngest male then first female, to be registered architects in the U.S. South. Love-Stanley is the business manager and principal in charge of production while her husband handles marketing and is in charge of design.
- In Serbia, Ljiljana Bakić often worked with her husband Dragoljub Bakić. Their most important work was the design of the Pionir Sports Hall, for which they won the "Grand Prix of the Belgrade Architecture Salon" in 1974. Another Serbian architect, Ivanka Raspopović, partnered with fellow architect Ivan Antić to design Belgrade's "Museum of Contemporary Art" and Kragujevac's "21 October Museum" in the 1960s. Both buildings have since become national monuments.
- Lella Vignelli (1934–2016) worked with her partner Massimo Vignelli throughout their lives. Massimo is known for graphic design and she for commercial interiors. They met while at architecture school in Venice, Italy and practice in Milan and the United States.
- Beatriz Peschard Mijares and her husband Alejandro Bernardi co-founded their architectural firm Bernardi Peschard Arquitectura in 2000 after meeting as students at Universidad Anáhuac México in Mexico City.
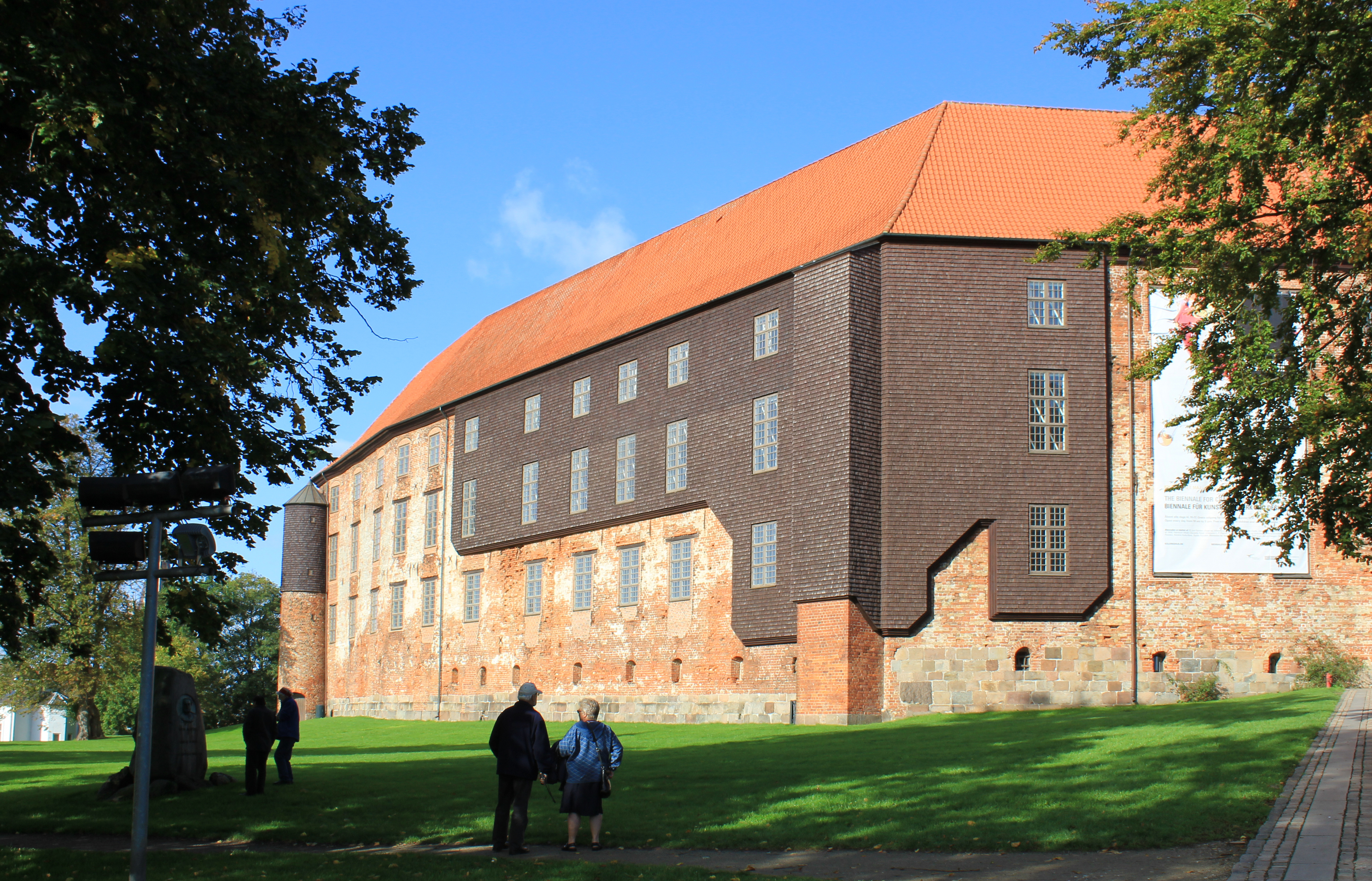
Igner Exner: Kolding Castle Restoration, Kolding (1970)

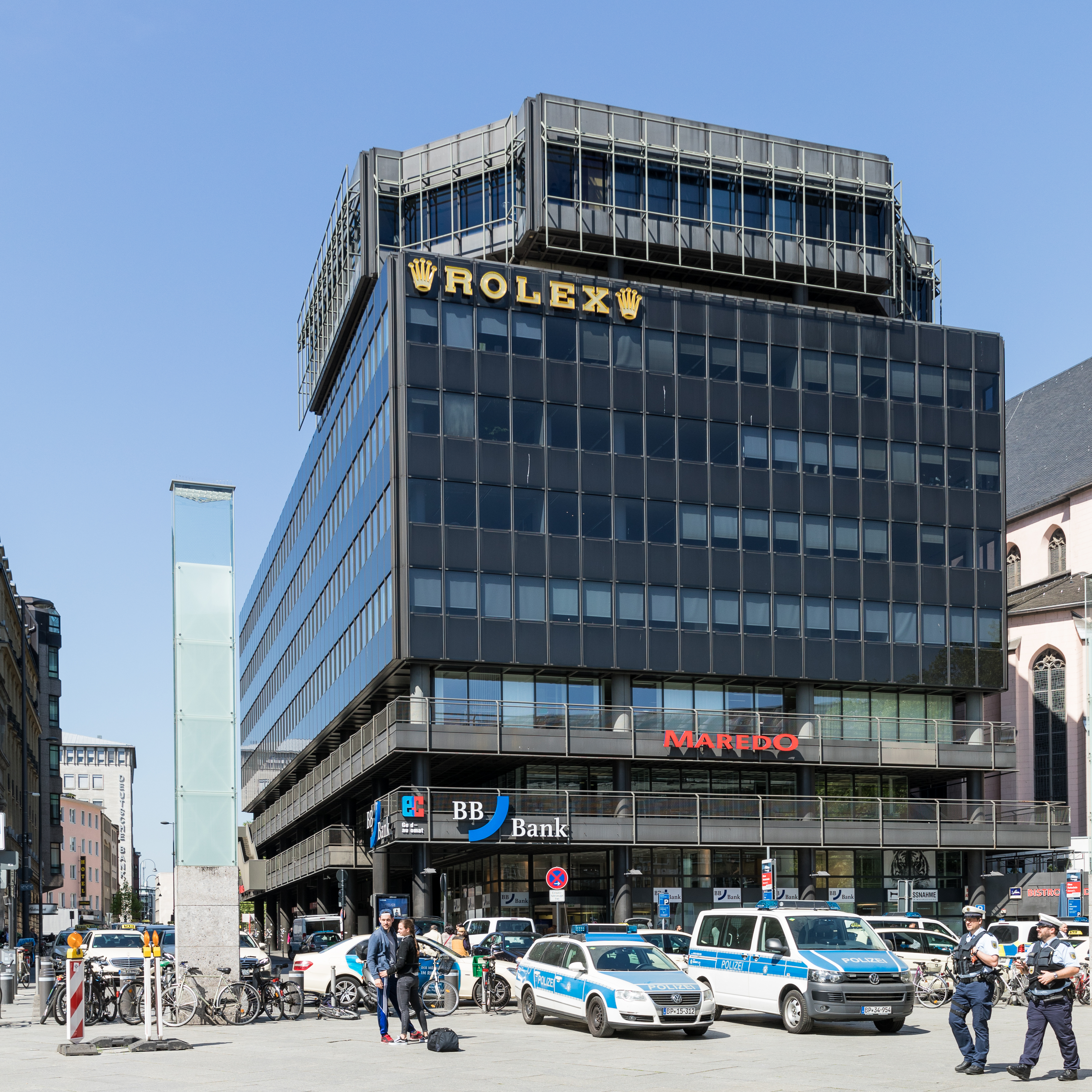
Margot Schürmann: Rolex Building, Köln (1975)

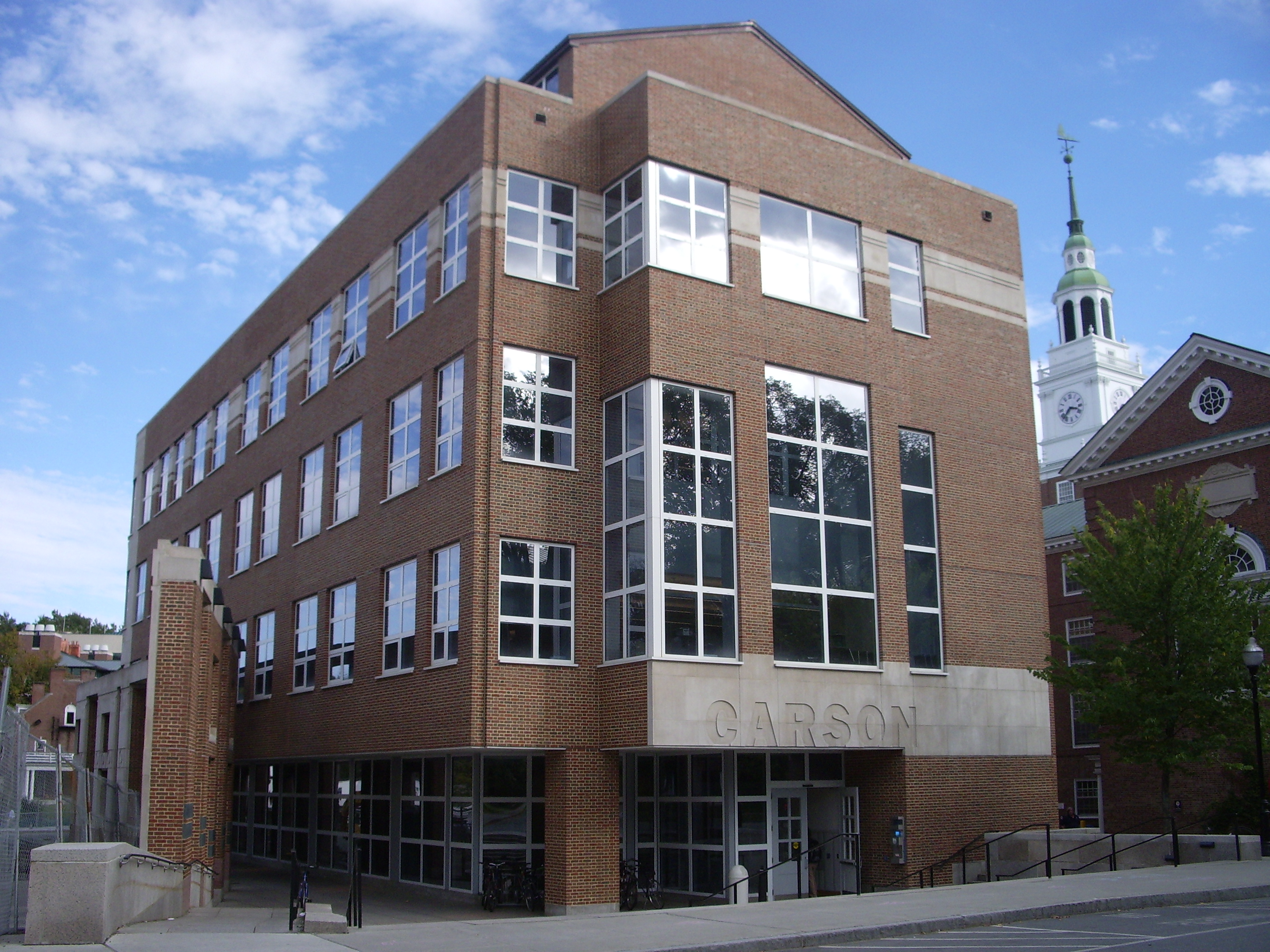
Denise Scott Brown: Carson Hall at Dartmouth College, Hanover (2002)

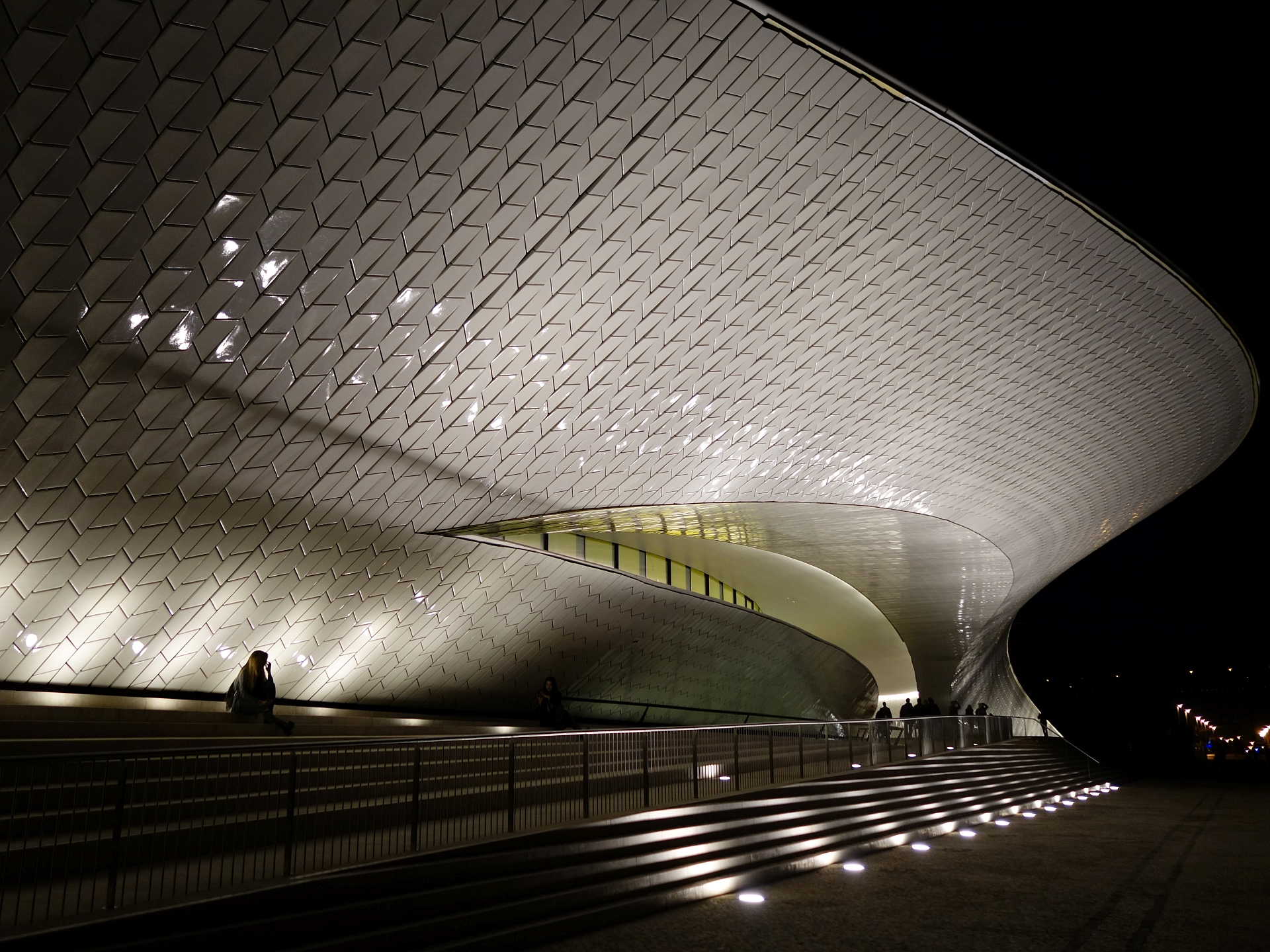
Amanda Levete: Museum of Art, Architecture and Technology, Lisbon (2016)

== 21st Century ==
Several women architects have had considerable success in recent years, gaining wide recognition for their achievements:

In 2004, the Iraqi-British architect Zaha Hadid became the first woman to be awarded the Pritzker Prize. Among her many projects, special mention was made of the Rosenthal Center for Contemporary Art in Cincinnati and the BMW Central Building in Leipzig. When awarding the prize, the chairman of the jury, spoke of her "unswerving commitment to modernism" explaining how she had moved away from existing typology, from high-tech, shifting the geometry of buildings." From 2004 until her death in 2016, she completed many other notable works including the Guangzhou Opera House in Guangzhou, China, and the London Aquatics Centre for the 2012 Summer Olympics.

In 2010, another woman became a Pritzker Prize winner, Kazuyo Sejima from Japan, in partnership with Ryue Nishizawa. Lord Palumbo, the jury chairman, spoke of their architecture "that is simultaneously delicate and powerful, precise and fluid, ingenious but not overly or overtly clever; for the creation of buildings that successfully interact with their contexts and the activities they contain, creating a sense of fullness and experiential richness." Special consideration had been given to the Glass Center at the Toledo Museum of Art in Ohio, and the 21st Century Museum of Contemporary Art, Kanazawa in Ishikawa, Japan.

In 2007 Anna Heringer (born 1977, Germany) won the Aga Khan Award for Architecture for her METI Handmade School built with bamboo and other local materials in Rudrapur, Bangladesh. An example of sustainable architecture, the project was praised not only for its simple, humane approach and beauty but also for the level of cooperation achieved between architects, craftsmen, clients and users. Several RIBA European Awards have been won in recent years by the Danish firm Lundgaard & Tranberg where Lene Tranberg (born 1956) has been a key architect. Projects have included the Royal Danish Playhouse (2008) and Tietgenkollegiet (2005).

In 2010, Sheila Sri Prakash was the first Indian Architect invited to serve on the World Economic Forum's Design Innovation Council, where she created the Reciprocal Design Index as a design tool for Holistically Sustainable Development. She is the first woman in India to have established her in own firm. In 1992, she was a pioneer of environmentally sustainable architecture and had designed a home with recycled material

In 2013, Women In Design, a student organization at the Harvard Graduate School of Design started a petition for the Pritzker Architecture Prize to recognize Denise Scott Brown who was not awarded in 1991, while her partner, Robert Venturi was. Also in 2013 Julia Morgan became the first woman to receive the AIA Gold Medal, which she received posthumously. In 2014 the Heydar Aliyev Cultural Centre, designed by Zaha Hadid, won the Design Museum Design of the Year Award, making her the first woman to win the top prize in that competition. In 2015 Hadid became the first woman to be awarded the RIBA Gold Medal in her own right.

In 2014 Parlour: women, equity, architecture published the Parlour Guides to Equitable Practice, which provide a practical resource for moving toward a more equitable profession, with a focus on gender equity.

In 2016, Heather Dubbeldam of Dubbeldam Architecture and Design was awarded the Prix de Rome along with $50,000 to travel to Denmark, Norway and Sweden to experience first hand net zero, passive and regenerative homes in a similar Northern Climate in order to develop a thesis on sustainability which she entitled ‘The Next Green – Innovation in Sustainable Housing’. Situated in Toronto, the firm was dedicated to providing these solutions within a northern context as their major design principles focuses on integrating these elements of energy efficiency seamlessly into the design process, rather than it being a separate entity.

In 2017, Black Females in Architecture was created to support black women who are underrepresented in architecture and the wider built environment.

In 2019, Part W developed their first campaign, 'The Alternative List'. It challenged the fact that the Royal Gold Medal for Architecture under the Royal Institute of British Architects had at that time only ever been granted to one woman in her own right over the previous 172 years.

In 2022 Architecture + Women NZ with Massey University Press published Making Space: A History of New Zealand Women in Architecture. Edited by Elizabeth Cox and written by Cox and 30 other women architects, architectural historians and academics it makes visible the contributions to architecture in New Zealand of over 500 women.

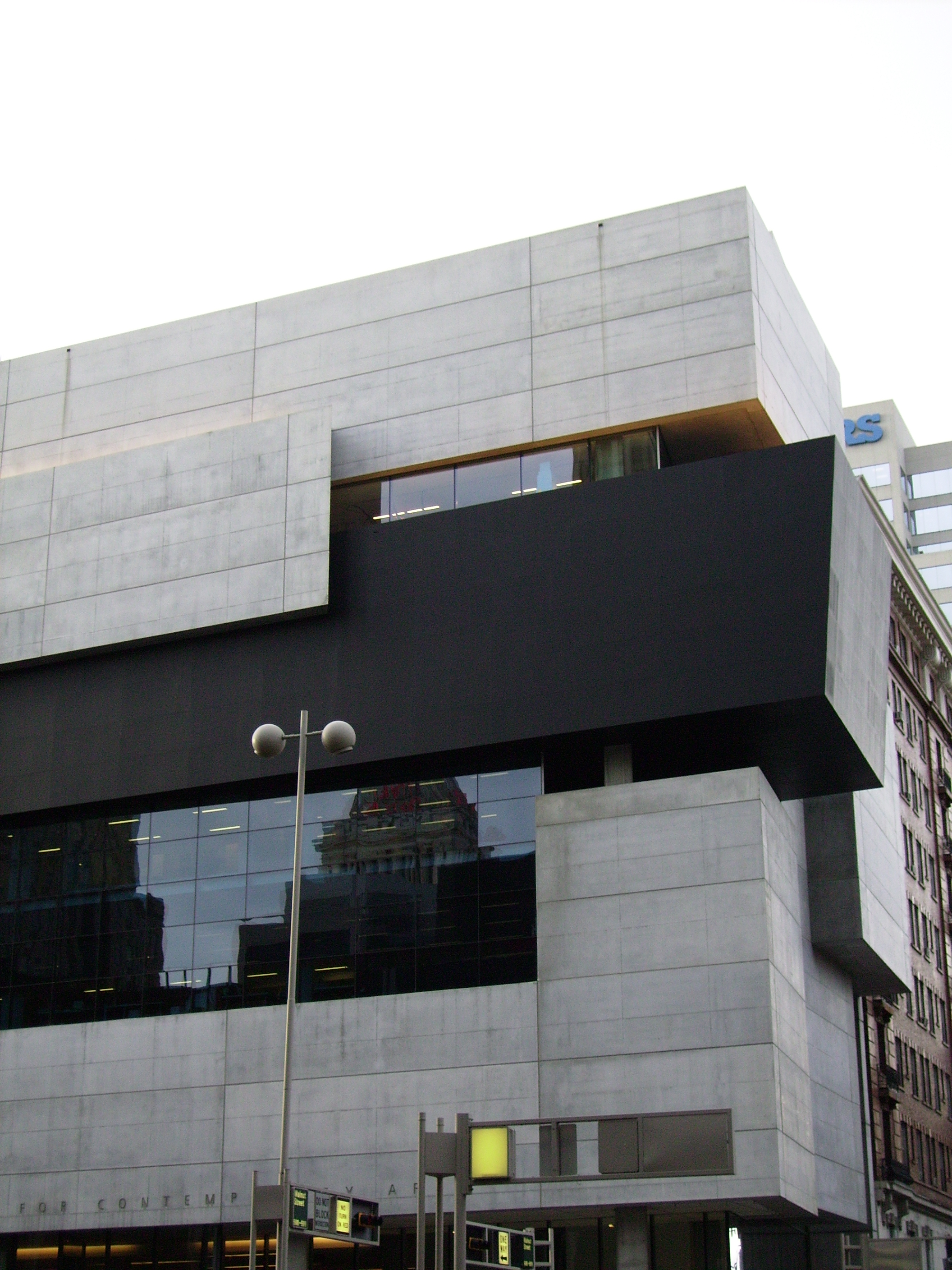
Zaha Hadid: Rosenthal Center for Contemporary Art, Cincinnati (2003)

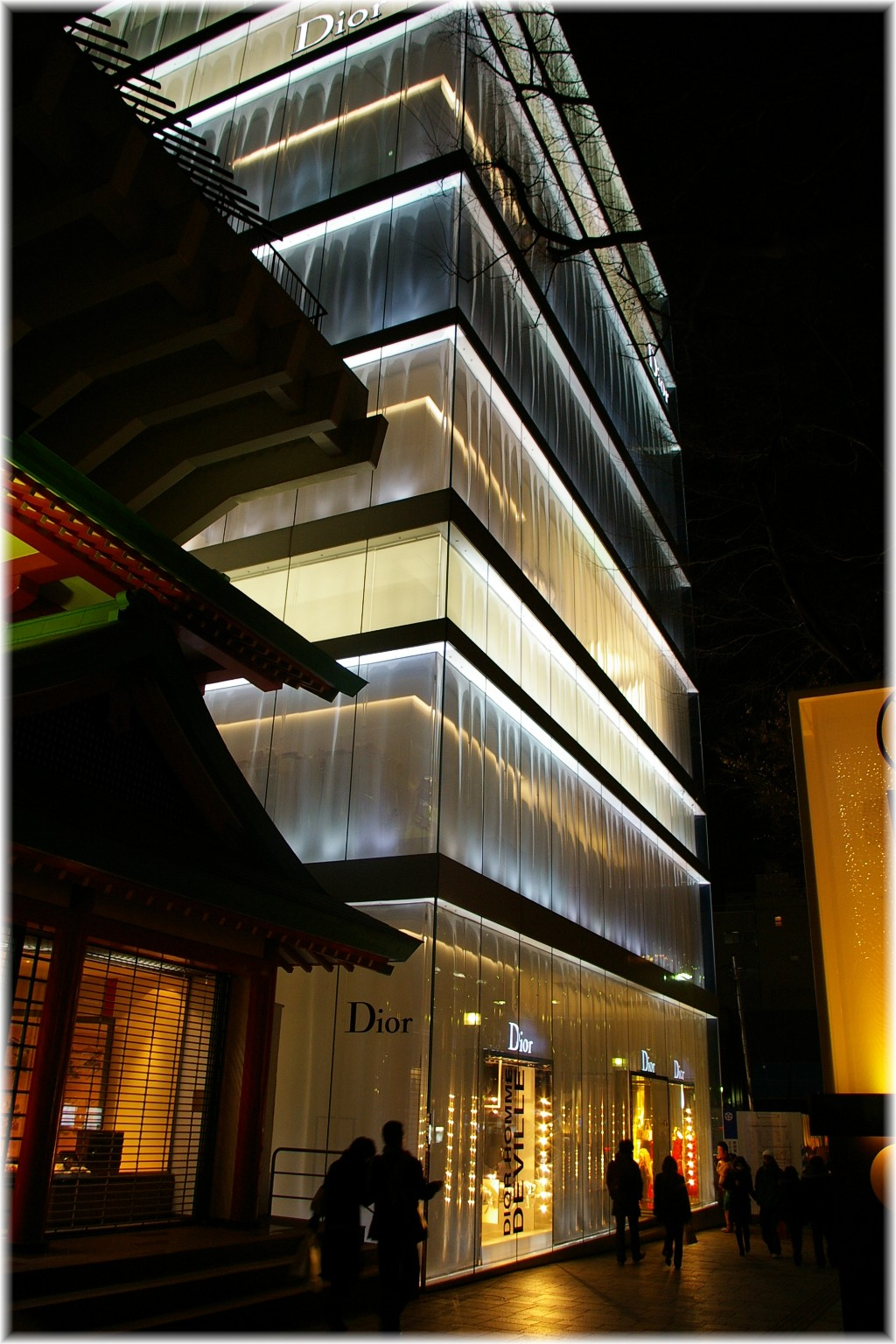
Kazuyo Sejima: Christian Dior Omotesando Building, Tokyo (2003)

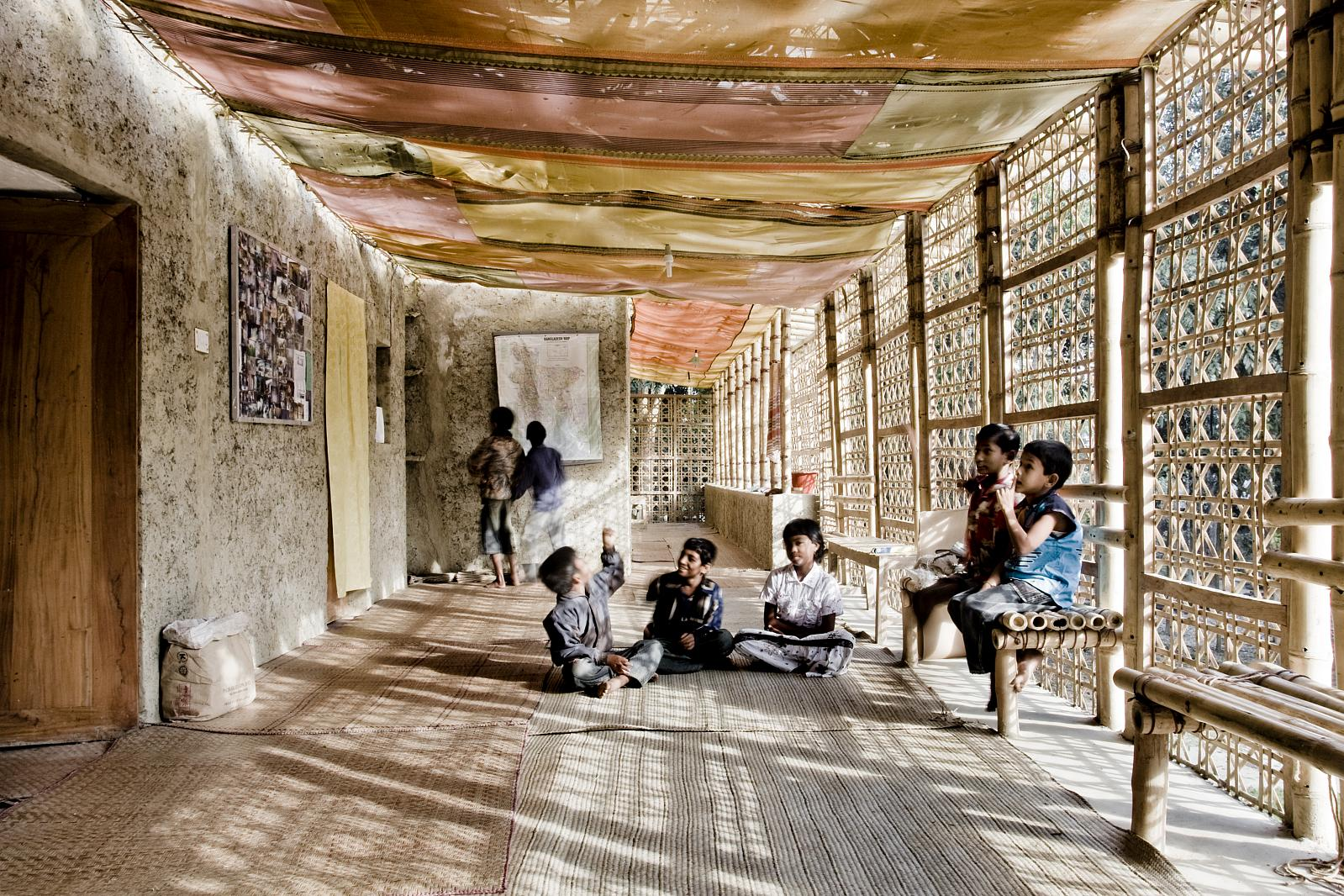
Anna Heringer: METI Handmade School, Bangladesh (2005)

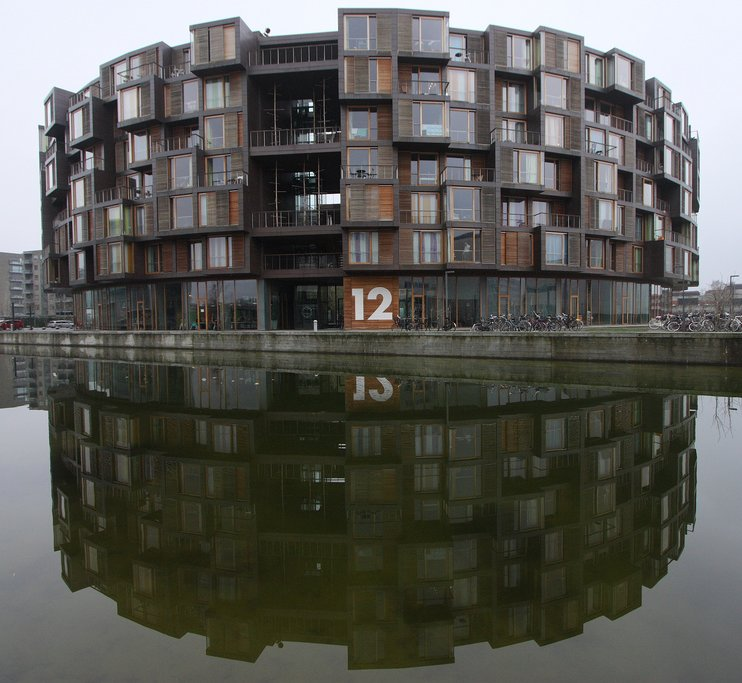
Lene Tranberg: Tietgen Student Housing, Copenhagen (2006)

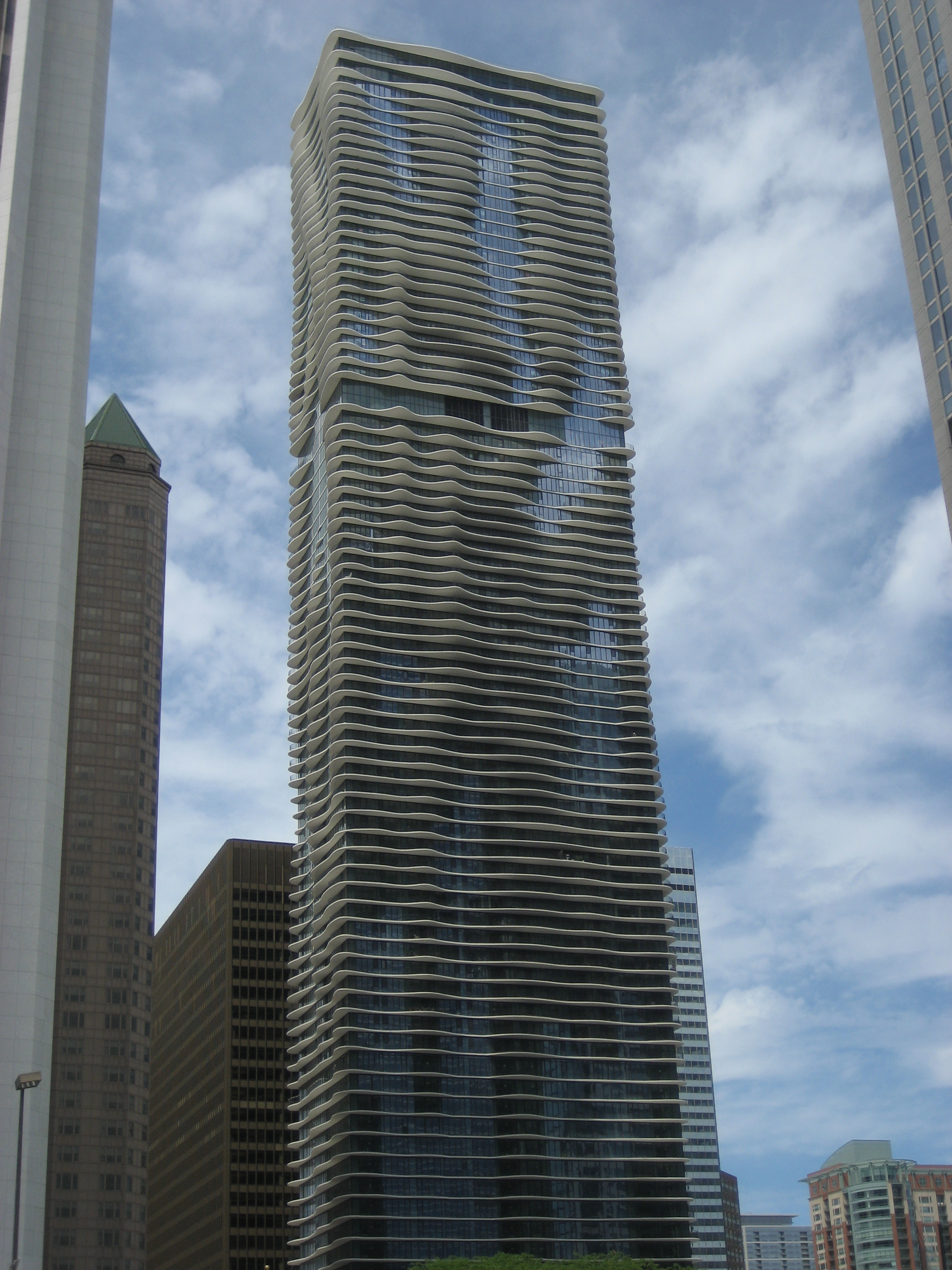
Jeanne Gang: Aqua, Chicago (2009)

== Women's influence ==
Although until recently their contributions have been largely unnoticed, women have in fact exerted a fair amount of influence on architecture over the past century. It was Susan Lawrence Dana, heiress to a mining fortune, who in 1902 chose to have her house in Springfield, Illinois, designed by Frank Lloyd Wright, so ensuring his breakthrough. Women have also played a key role in historic preservation through organizations such as the Daughters of the American Revolution (1890). In 1985, Bulgarian architect Milka Bliznakov founded the International Archive of Women in Architecture to expand the availability of research materials concerning women in architecture. Recent studies also show that from the 1980s, women, as housewives and consumers, were instrumental in bringing new approaches to design, especially interiors, achieving a shift from architecture to space.

A study on experience in Canada highlights the widespread contributions women have made in recent years, developing innovative approaches to practice and design. Women's significant and growing presence in the profession has attracted more attention than issues of marginalization.

Exhibitions presenting women's achievements in various fields provided early opportunities for women demonstrate their competence in designing pavilions. They included the 1893 exhibition in Chicago, where the women's pavilion was designed by Sophia Hayden, and two in 1914 in Germany: the Werkbund Exhibition in Cologne, whose Haus der Frau was designed by Lilly Reich, and the Burga Expo in Leipzig devoted to books and graphic art. Inspired by these successes, in 1928 Lux Guyer from Switzerland designed pavilions for SAFFA (Schweizerische Ausstellung für Frauenarbeit) a fair exhibiting the accomplishments of women first held in Bern. The second SAFFA, held in Zurich in 1958, was put together by a team of 28 female architects, establishing architecture as a profession open to women in Switzerland.

In 2021, the Barbican, a cultural institution in London, presented a project including a physical exhibition, events programme and publication entitled "How We Live Now: Reimagining Spaces with Matrix Feminist Design Co-operative." The project centred around the Matrix Feminist Design Co-operative but also explored broader questions such as who our built environment is designed for and by, and who is excluded by virtue of this. The cooperative was based on feminist ideologies and principles, including a non-hierarchical structure, as well as adopting a more participatory approach to design.

== Recent statistics ==
Europe

In 2010, a survey conducted by the Architects' Council of Europe in 33 countries, found that there were 524,000 architects, of whom 31% were women. However the proportions differed widely from country to country. The countries with the highest proportion of female architects were Greece (57%), Croatia (56%), Bulgaria (50%), Slovenia (50%) and Sweden (49%) while those with the lowest were Slovakia (15%), Austria (16%), the Netherlands (19%), Germany (21%) and Belgium (24%). Over 200,000 of Europe's architects are in Italy or Germany where the proportions of women are 30% and 21% respectively.

Australia

A study conducted in Australia in 2002 indicated that women comprise 43% of architecture students while their representation in the profession varied from 11.6% in Queensland to 18.2% in Victoria. More recent Australian data, collected and analyzed as part of the Equity and Diversity in the Australian Architecture Profession research project, shows that whatever measure used women continue to disappear from the profession. Women have comprised over 40% of Australian architecture graduates for over two decades, but are only 20% of registered architects in Australia.

South Africa

In 2016 only 21% of the architectural professionals registered in South Africa were women. A survey by the SA Institute of Architects Eastern Cape institute showed that in 2014 only 29% of architecture students graduating from Nelson Mandela Metropolitan University were women.

United Kingdom

A United Kingdom survey in 2000 stated that 13% of practising architects were women although women comprised 38% of students and 22% of teaching staff. Data from the Fees Bureau in November 2010 showed, however, that only 19% of professional architects were women, a drop of 5% since 2008.

RIBA reports that the share of women in leadership roles has increased only slightly. Although women account for just 31% of architects in the UK overall, they represented nearly half (47%) of new entrants to the profession in 2023.

United States

In 2009, the United States National Architectural Accrediting Board reported that 41% of architecture graduates were women, with this number rising to 51% of graduates by 2021. The AIA National Associates Committee Report from 2004 gives the percentage of licensed female architects as 20%. In 2003, an AIA Women in Architecture study found that women accounted for 27% of staff in U.S. architecture firms. The honorific FAIA was held by 174 women and 2,199 men, or roughly 8% in 2005. The AIA reports that the percentage of women as a total of their organization's Architect members increased from 15.7% to 24.1% between 2012 and 2021. A 2016 Equity in Architecture survey, published by the design advocacy group EQxD, reported that females were 9 times less likely to hold the majority in an architecture firm's leadership than their male counterparts.

Canada

Though women make up approximately 50% of graduates from Canadian architecture programs, Statistics Canada's 2011 census revealed that only 29% of the country's registered body of architects identifies as female.

== See also ==
- List of women architects
- Women of the Bauhaus
- Marion Mahony Griffin Prize, awarded to acknowledge a distinctive body of work by a female architect (Australian Institute of Architects)
- Women's School of Planning and Architecture
- Moira Gemmill Prize for Emerging Architecture
