= Mary Townley (architect) =

English architect

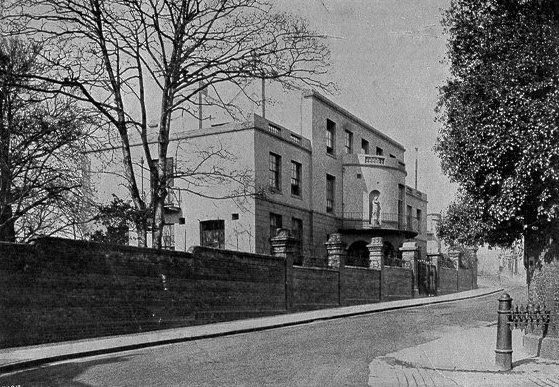
Mary Townley: Townley House, Ramsgate

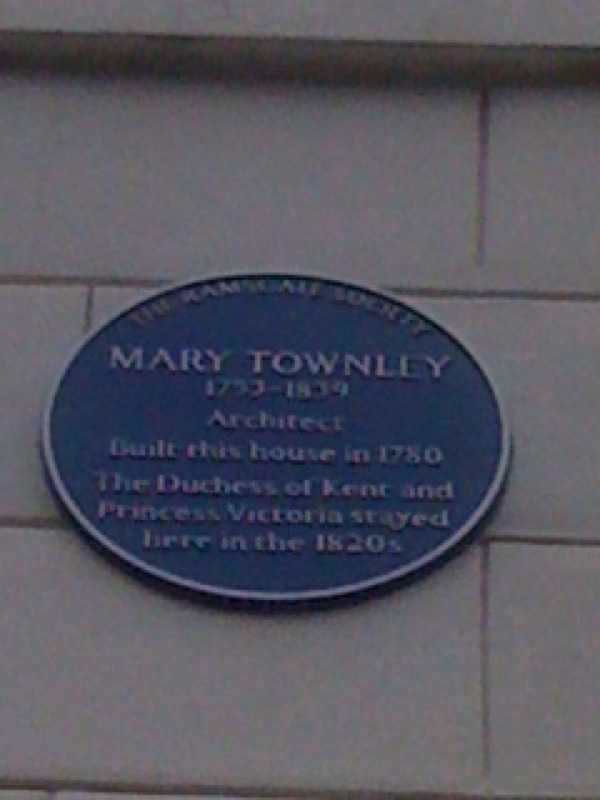
Plaque, Townley House

Mary Townley née Gosling (1753–1839) was an English architect who designed several buildings in Ramsgate in the late 18th century, making her one of England's earliest female architects. Her most notable building was Townley House.

== Biography ==
In the 1770s, Mary married James Townley, a proctor, son of James Townley the English dramatist. The couple established themselves in Ramsgate the east of Kent which was developing as a small port. Townley's business earnings were invested in buildings designed by his wife. They included barracks, later converted into houses, the development of Albion Place in the centre of Ramsgate, but above all Townley House (1792), a large mansion considered to be an architectural gem. A set of townhouses she designed in 1820 became the Regency Hotel and later included a language school. The building has recently been fully restored. An account written by her relative and tutor, the artist Sir Joshua Reynolds, praises Mary Townley's flair for architectural design, making her unique among women of her day.

Mary Townley played a prominent role in local society, arranging balls at Townley House and entertaining the nobility. Among her guests in the 1820s was King William IV. The Duchess of Kent with her daughter Princess Victoria, later Queen Victoria, stayed there for several months. The Townleys had nine children but after their eldest and youngest sons died in 1808 and 1810, Mary lost her interest in fashion and society. As a result of the devout Christian inclinations of two of her other sons, evenings were instead devoted to Bible readings. After her husband died, Mary became active in the local church until her death on 19 March 1839, aged 86.

== See also ==
- Women in architecture
