= Signe Lagerborg-Stenius =

Finnish architect (1870–1968)

- Born: Signe Lagerborg; April 4, 1870; Helsinki, Finland
- Died: July 15, 1968 (aged 98); Helsinki, Finland
- Education: Bachelors in Architecture, Helsinki Polytechnic Institute
- Occupation: Architect
- Employer: Child Welfare Association
- Known for: Architecture, Women's equality activism
- Notable work: Berghäll Orphanage (1895), Bortre Tölö Convalescent Center (1910), Ljungbo Sanatorium (1910)
- Title: City Council of Helsinki Member
- Term: 1926-1930; 1933-1944
- Political party: Swedish People's Party of Finland
- Spouse: Gunnar Stenius
- Children: 2
- Relatives: Rolf Lagerborg (Cousin)

Signe Lagerborg-Stenius (4 April 1870 - 15 July 1968) was a Finnish architect and member of the Helsinki City Council (1926–1930, 1933–1944). She was the second woman in Finland to complete a four-year course at the Polytechnic.

== Early life and education ==
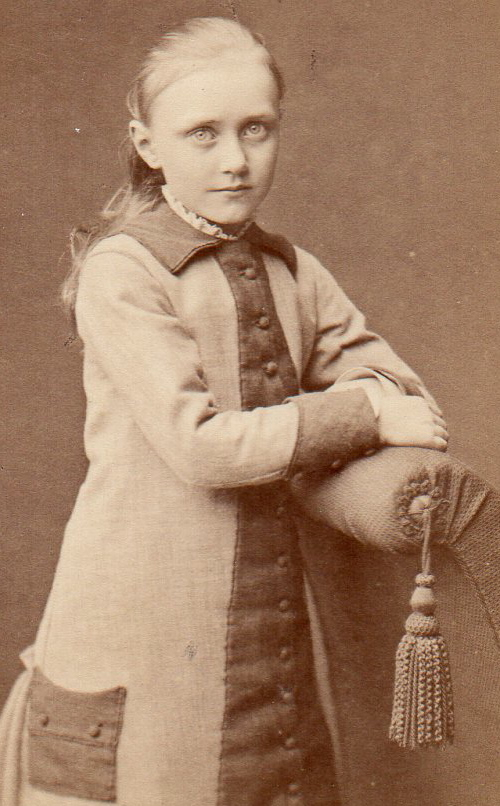
Signe Lagerborg-Stenius as a Child

Signe Lagerborg was born on 4 April 1870 in Helsinki to a noble family of Robert Olof Lagerborg and Carolina Lovisa Constance Furuhjelm. Her father was the editor-in-chief of Helsingfors Dagblad and was a member of state parliament.

In 1888, Lagerborg studied architecture at Helsinki Polytechnic Institute, graduating in 1892. She became the second woman to graduate a four-year program at the Helsinki Polytechnic Institute, following Signe Hornborg. Additionally, Lagerborg, was trained as a drawing teacher at the University of Helsinki.

After her study trips to Sweden, Denmark and Central Europe, Lagerborg became the first female architect to work for the General Board of Public Buildings, where she worked from 1892 to 1905.

== Career ==
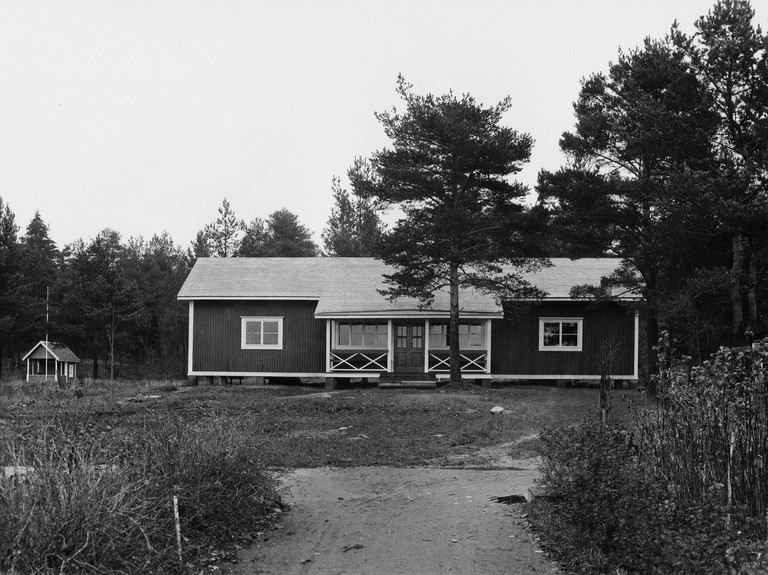
Clubhouse for Brunakärr's allotment garden, Storstugan designed by Signe Lagerborg-Stenius

After Lagerbord married an architect Gunnar Stenius in 1905, she worked at her husband's agency, and at the same time had her own private practice, as well as worked as a drawing teacher at the School of Crafts. Lagerborg-Stenius primarily dealt with the erection and construction methods of the new apartments.

In 1905 Lagerborg-Stenius drew one orphanage and a home for unmarried mothers, which was completed. As an architect at the Child Welfare Association in Finland, she designed four buildings, all of which have been preserved.

Besides a career in architecture, Lagerborg-Stenius was an active female advocate involved in women movement.

She was also was a member of the Swedish People's Party of Finland, serving on the city council in Helsinki in 1926–30, and in 1933–44. She became an executive board member of the RKP (SFP) with the slogan “inexpensive and practical."

Signe Lagerbord-Stenius died on 15 July 1968 in Helsinki.

=== Buildings ===
Building	Location	Year Built
Orphanage	Kallio	1895
Convalescent Center	Tölö	1910
Ljungbo Sanatorium	Uusimaa	1910
Cure for Respiratory Diseases Building	Hanko	1914
Storstugan Building	Helsinki	1928
