= Signe Hornborg =

Finnish architect (1862–1916)

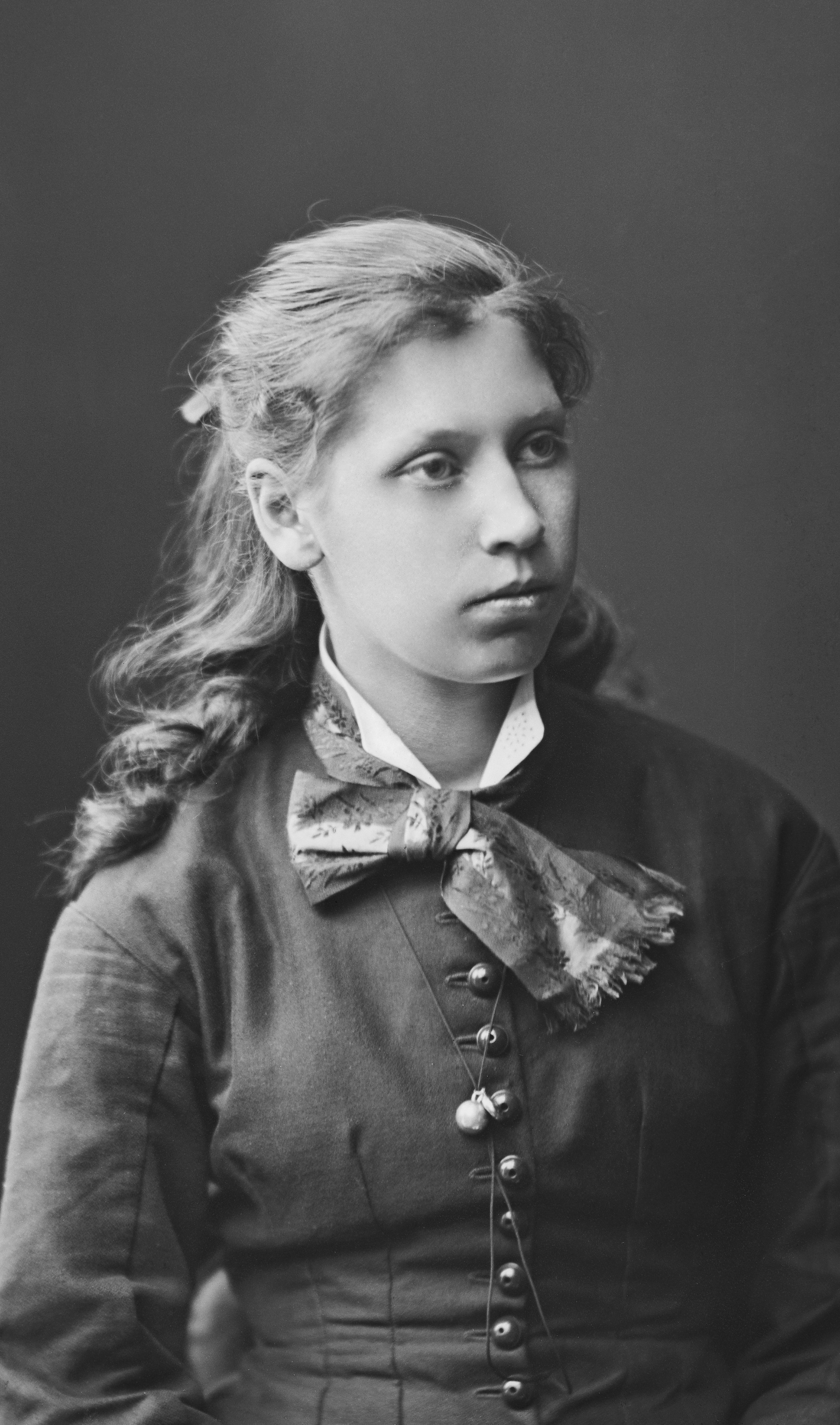
- Born: 8 November 1862; Turku, Finland
- Died: 6 December 1916 (aged 54); Helsinki

Signe Ida Katarina Hornborg (8 November 1862, Turku – 6 December 1916, Helsinki) was a Finnish architect. Upon her reception of her architectural diploma in 1890, she became the first official female architect in the world.

== Biography ==
A bishop's daughter, she attended the Helsinki Polytechnic Institute from the spring of 1888. Hornborg graduated as an architect in 1890 by special permission, as female students were not admitted to the school. After first embarking on active collaboration with Elia Heikel, she joined the agency of Lars Sonck.

One of her most notable works is the Signelinna (also known as Nerwanderin talo or Nerwander House) in Pori (1892). She also designed the outside of the Sepänkatu Apartment Building (1897) in Helsinki, as it was not considered right for women to design entire buildings at a time when architecture was a man's profession.

Working in the national romanticism style, Hornborg also contributed to the design for the fire department building in Hamina, requiring no fee. She also worked on municipal buildings for poor children in Helsinki.

== See also ==
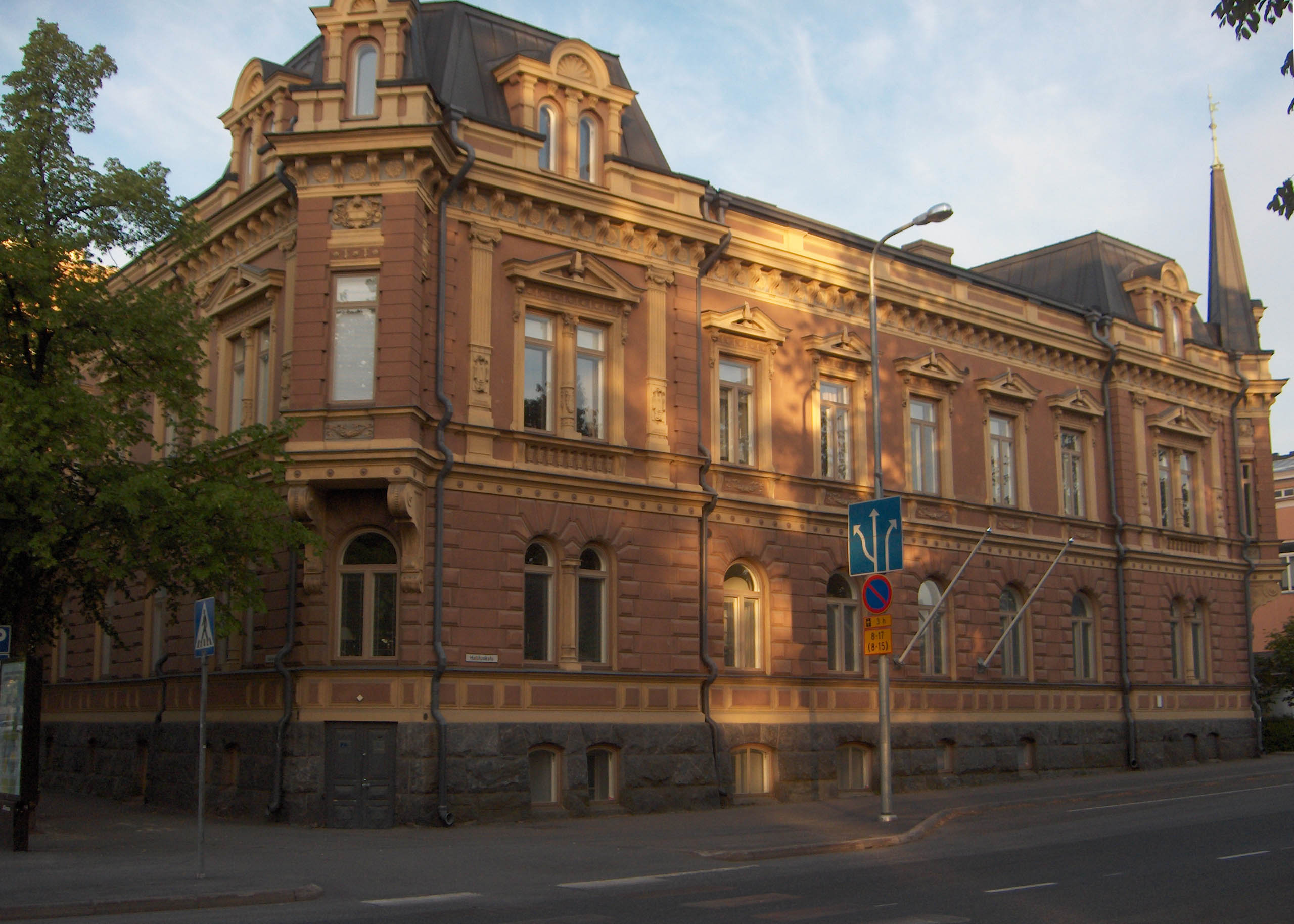
Signe Hornborg: Signelinna in Pori (1892)

- Women in architecture
