= Bertha Enwald =

Finnish architect, inventor and artist

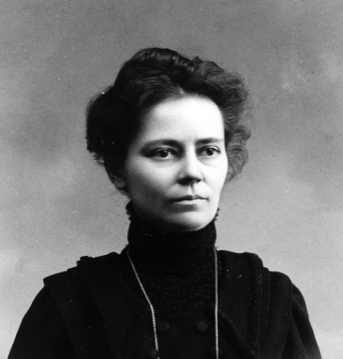
- Born: Bertha Katarina Enwald; 10 April 1871; Parikkala, Finland
- Died: 1 January 1957 (aged 85); Huittinen, Finland
- Occupation(s): architect, inventor

Bertha Katarina Enwald (10 April 1871 – 1 January 1957) was a Finnish architect, inventor, artist, and drawing teacher. She was the fourth Finnish woman to graduate as an architect.

== Early life and education ==
Enwald was born on 10 April 1871 in the municipality of Parikkala, Finland to the doctor Kurt Enwald and Johanna Augusta Walle. From 1890, she studied at the Department of Architecture at the Polytechnic College in Helsinki. In 1887, Enwald graduated from the Swedish girls' school in Savonlinna. When Enwald finished her studies in 1894, she became the fourth Finnish woman to graduate as an architect.

== Career ==
After graduation, Enwald worked as an architect in the cities of Savonlinna and Kuopio. In Kuopio she collaborated in the studios of the architects J. Eskil Hindersson and Leander Ikonen, thus participating in relevant Finnish Art Nouveau projects. The same year she made measurement drawings of

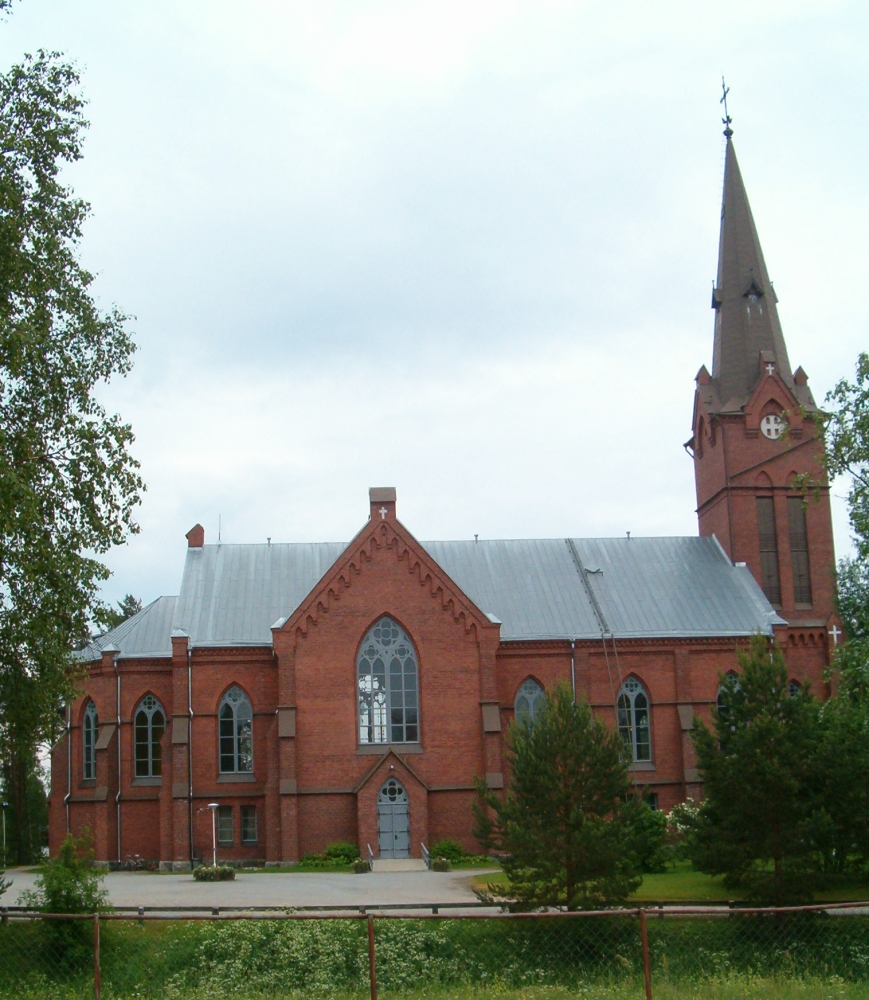
Nurmes Church designed by B.Enwald

Nurmes Church. The church was originally designed by J. Westerlund but had to be altered during construction. Enwald's drawings show the final architectural design of the church. In addition, Enwald designed independently the premises for a pharmacy in Kuopio in 1897.

In 1898, Enwald moved to Saint Petersburg, Russia, where she worked in the studio of the architect Frithiof Mieritz until 1900. It is likely that Enwald was recruited on the recommendation of Mieritz.

From 1900 to 1901, she worked in the office of architect Reinhold Guleke in Tartu, Estonia but returned to Saint Petersburg to the architectural office of Frithiof Mieritz in 1902. Intense work in St. Petersburg on the one hand and the builders' attitude towards a woman as an architect made Enwald think of a career change. Enwald enrolled in the teacher department of Helsinki School of Crafts graduating as drawing and craft teacher in 1904. After graduation, she moved to Pori, western Finland, and worked as a drawing teacher in Pori Lyceum until retirement.

Enwald didn't completely abandon design and architecture, she designed wooden cabins, small wooden houses, and furniture taking advantage of her craft studies and her knowledge of the wood material.

Enwald also excelled as an inventor. In 1927 she developed and patented a device for perspective drawing, Finnish patent number 11404.

Museum of Finnish Architecture has numerous drawings related to Enwald's architectural studies.

Bertha Enwald died on 1 January 1957 in Huittinen, Finland.
