= St Ethelbert's Church, Ramsgate =

St Ethelbert's Church
- The Catholic Church of Ss Ethelbert & Gertrude
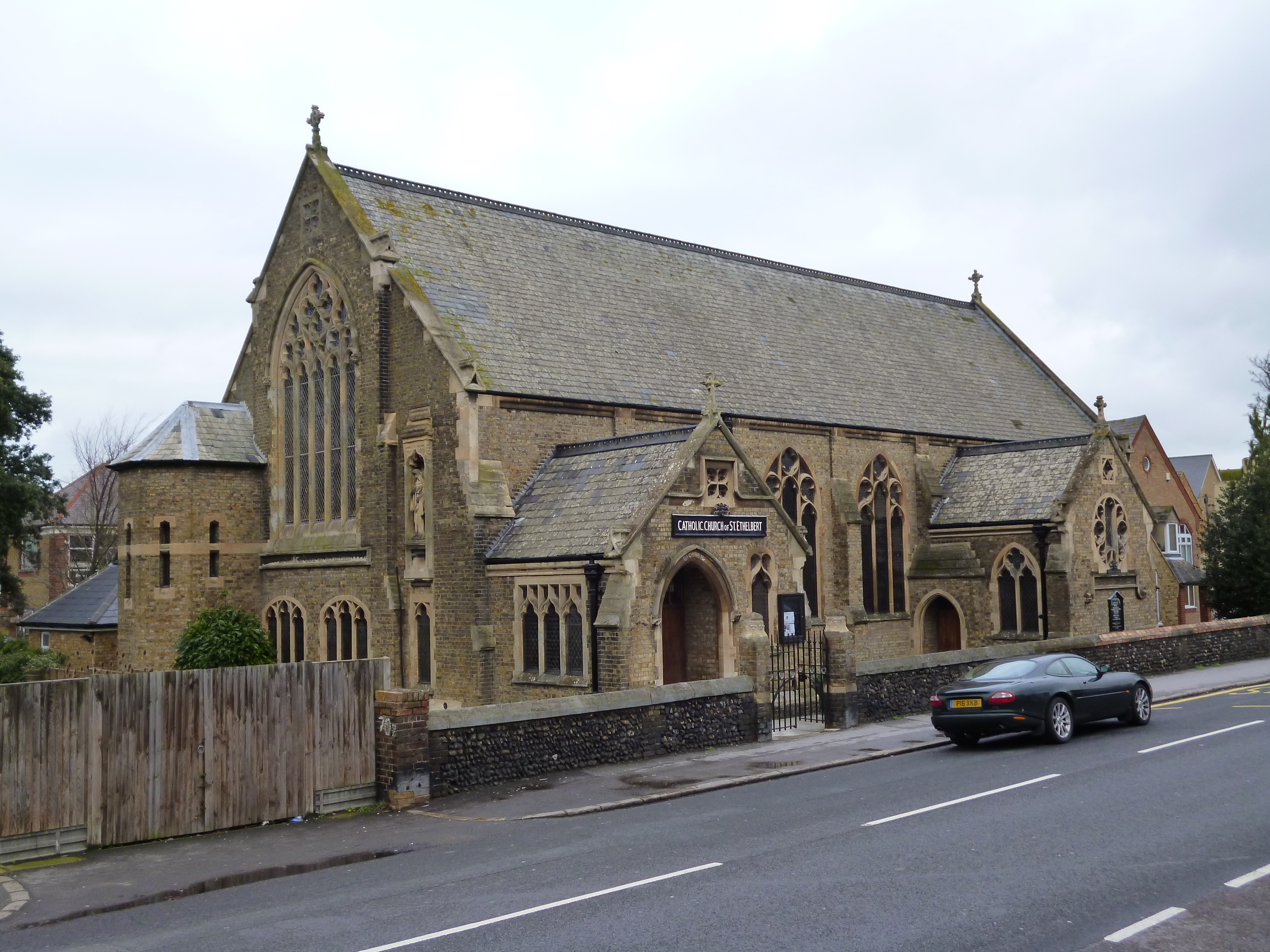

- Location within Kent
- 51°20′23″N 1°25′29″E
- OS grid reference: TR 38628 65624
- Location: Ramsgate, Kent
- Country: England
- Denomination: Roman Catholic
- Website: http://www.saintethelberts.com/

Architecture
- Style: Gothic architecture
- Years built: 1901 - 1902
- Groundbreaking: June 1901
- Completed: 17 August 1902

Specifications
- Length: 80 feet (24 m)
- Width: 30 feet (9.1 m)

Administration
- Archdiocese: Southwark
- Deanery: Thanet
- Parish: Ramsgate and Minster

Clergy
- Archbishop: Archbishop John Wilson
- Rector: Fr Jonathon Routh
- Priest: Fr Simon Heans

Dedicated to Saints Ethelbert and Gertrude, St Ethelbert's Church is a Roman Catholic church on Hereson Road in Ramsgate, Kent, England. Designed by Peter Paul Pugin, the church was built by W. W. Martin and Sons of Ramsgate and is the Catholic parish church.

== History ==
St Ethelbert’s was built with the financial patronage of Frances Elizabeth Ellis (1846-1930), whose inheritance from her father enabled her to devote her life to founding churches, hospitals, hospices, orphanages and nursing homes. The church's cornerstone was laid in June 1901, and it was completed on 17 August 1902. Joseph Power, OSB, was the church's first priest.

On the afternoon of Friday, 23 May 1980, 88-year-old parish priest Edward Hull, OSB, and Ethel Maude Lelean (his housekeeper for 27 years) were killed in the presbytery. Hull, a Royal Air Force chaplain during World War II, was the former headmaster of the Abbey School then at Westgate. Henry John Gallagher, aged 29, was convicted of the double manslaughter (not murder, owing to diminished responsibility) and sent to Broadmoor Hospital.

The presbytery, which pre-dated the church, was subsequently demolished and rebuilt by architect and parishioner Robin Carter.

In the late 2000s, four Catholic parishes which covered the south west of Thanet were merged into one. In February 2009 this was named the Parish of Ramsgate and Minster, with St Ethelbert's as the parish church. In 2010, the Benedictine Monks of St Augustine’s Abbey voted to leave their Ramsgate monastery in the parish. The church which had been used as the Abbey Church was designated the Shrine of St Augustine in March 2012, and is of particular interest through its founder and designer Augustus Pugin. Fr Marcus Holden was the first Rector of the Shrine of St Augustine and served as Parish Priest from 2010-2018. The current Rector of the shrine and Parish Priest is Fr Jonathon Routh.

== Reception ==
On 27 August 1902, the East Kent Times and District Advertiser said about the new church:

The Church is in the early decorated style of Gothic architecture, and in dimensions is 80 feet long and 30 feet wide. There is a fine Gothic altar, with columns of Labrador granite, polished at Aberdeen. A stone statue weighing about six hundredweight represents St. Gertrude in an attitude of prayer, holding in one hand the Sacred Heart. A mouse running up a crosier represents the Temptation of the Devil. In the Lady Chapel there is a beautiful statue of the Virgin of Lourdes; to the right of the altar is a statue of the Sacred Heart. The confessional and seats are of Gothic design from designs by Mr. Pugin and furnished by Messrs. Bolton Bros., of Cheltenham; the tabernacle of worked brass is by Hardman, of Birmingham. Externally, the church is executed in stock bricks and stone dressings. The charming traceried windows are lead glazed. The open timber roof is thickly traceried with Westmoreland green slating. There is a very fine west window. On the north side at the eastern end is a sacristy, while the south, or Hereson road frontage, is the porch and the Lady Chapel. There is a gallery at the west end. The internal wood-work is pitch pine and there is a solid wood block floor covering concrete. It is intended that a chancel be added along with the erection of a graceful tower. Altogether, St Ethelbert’s Church is a worthy addition to the public buildings of the district.

== See also ==
- Historic buildings in Ramsgate
