= St Augustine's, Ramsgate =

St Augustine's, Ramsgate may refer to:

- Pugin's Church and Shrine of St Augustine, otherwise known as St Augustine's Church
- St Augustine's Abbey, Ramsgate, a former Benedictine abbey in Ramsgate
