= The Grange, Ramsgate =

The Grange
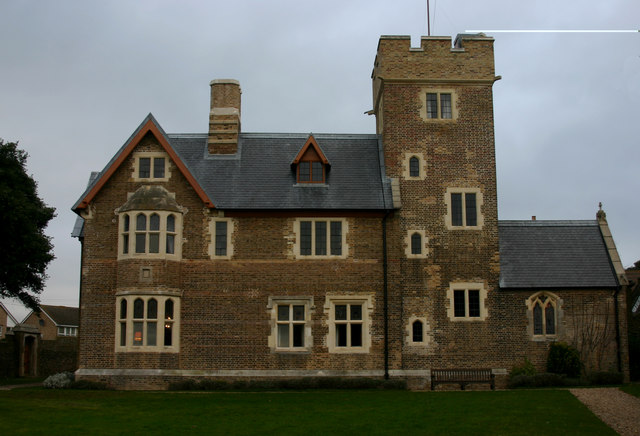
- The south frontage

- Location within Kent
- 51.3282°N 1.4098°E
- Type: House
- Location: Ramsgate, Kent, England

History
- Built: 1843-1844

Site notes
- Architect: Augustus Welby Northmore Pugin
- Architectural style: Gothic Revival
- Governing body: Landmark Trust

Listed Building – Grade I
- Official name: The Grange
- Designated: 13 August 1968
- Reference no.: 1203285

Listed Building – Grade II
- Official name: Carriage Gates and Gate Piers, Walls and West Wicket Gate at the Grange
- Designated: 23 June 1986
- Reference no.: 1336329

The Grange is a house in Ramsgate, Kent, on the south coast of England. It was designed as his own home by the Victorian architect and designer Augustus Pugin, and built between 1843 and 1844. The Grange is built in Gothic Revival style, Pugin intending it to be both a home and a manifesto for his architectural philosophy. Rescued from demolition by the Landmark Trust in 1997, the Grange is a Grade I listed building.

The house is notable for its influence, being described by Historic England as occupying "a crucial place in the development of C19 domestic architecture, in planning and style", and by Pugin's biographer Rosemary Hill as "a model for the English family home that was used in various ways by three generations of architects."

== History ==
Pugin bought the land for the site at West Cliff, Ramsgate, in 1841. The house was built between 1843 and 1844 by the builder George Myers. Pugin's second wife died in 1844 and it was only after his third marriage to Jane Knill in 1848 that it became a family home. The interior of the house was finally completed in 1850. It is built from the inside out in the sense that the layout of the rooms was considered before the outside of the building. This is in contrast to the Georgian style that preceded it. The style was influential on subsequent English architecture designed by architects like Edwin Lutyens.

Pugin died in the house in 1852 at the age of 40. He is buried in the impressive Pugin chantry chapel in St Augustine's Church, next to the house, which was also designed by him and completed by his eldest son, Edward Pugin, who was also an architect.

Various additions were made by Edward Pugin, including the entrance gates and the long porch.

The Grange was listed at grade I in 1968.

The house was rescued from demolition by the Landmark Trust in 1997 and restored by them to its condition in Pugin's day with grants from the Heritage Lottery Fund, English Heritage, Thanet District Council and elsewhere. It was re-opened in 2006 for up to eight temporary residents at a time and visitors by appointment on Wednesdays. In October 2010, The Grange was awarded the Restoration of the Century award (South region) by Country Life magazine. A Time Team special documents the work done and biographs Augustus Pugin's life.

== Gallery ==
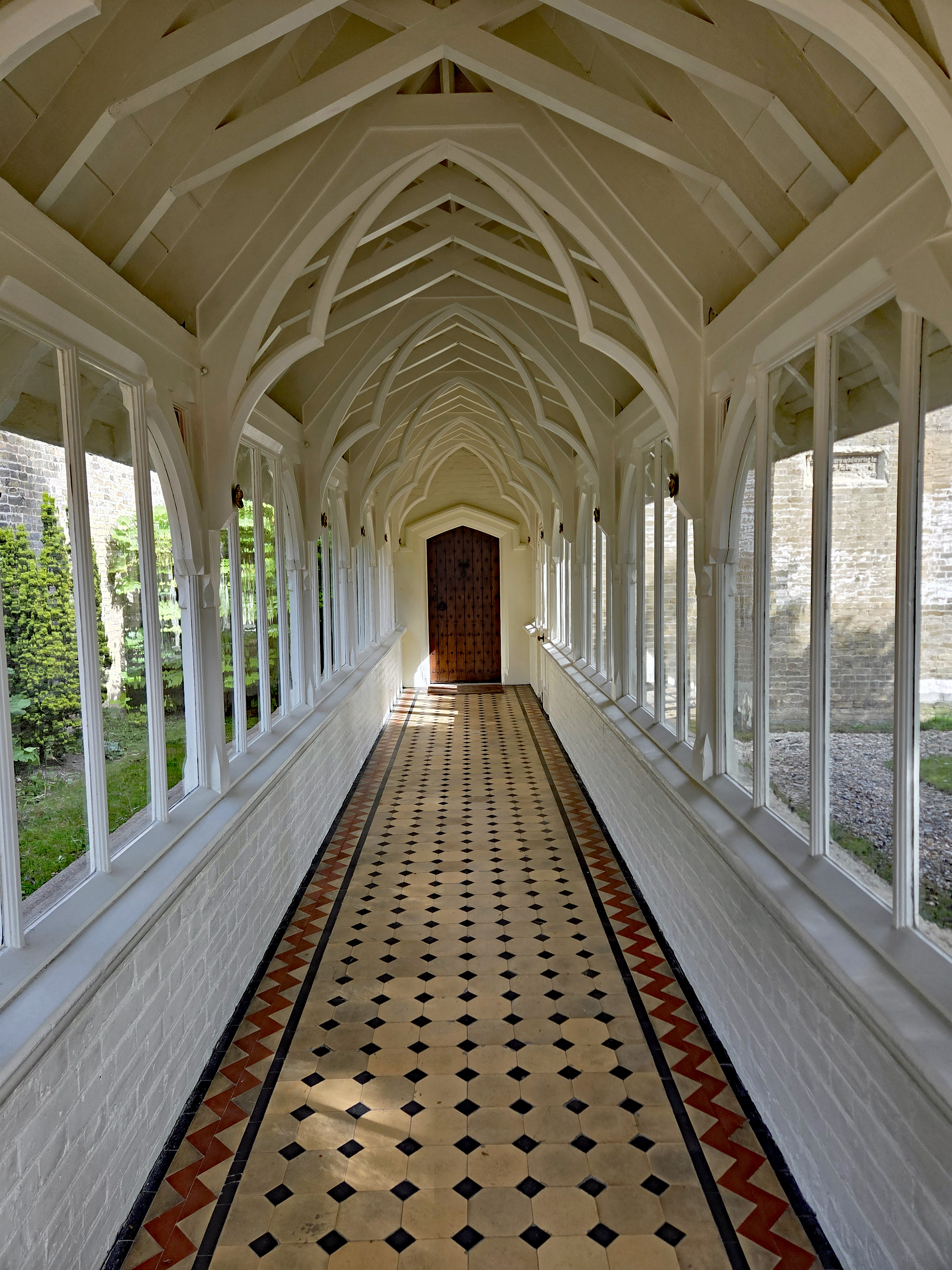
Pentice (a covered walkway, added by Edward Pugin) leading to the front door

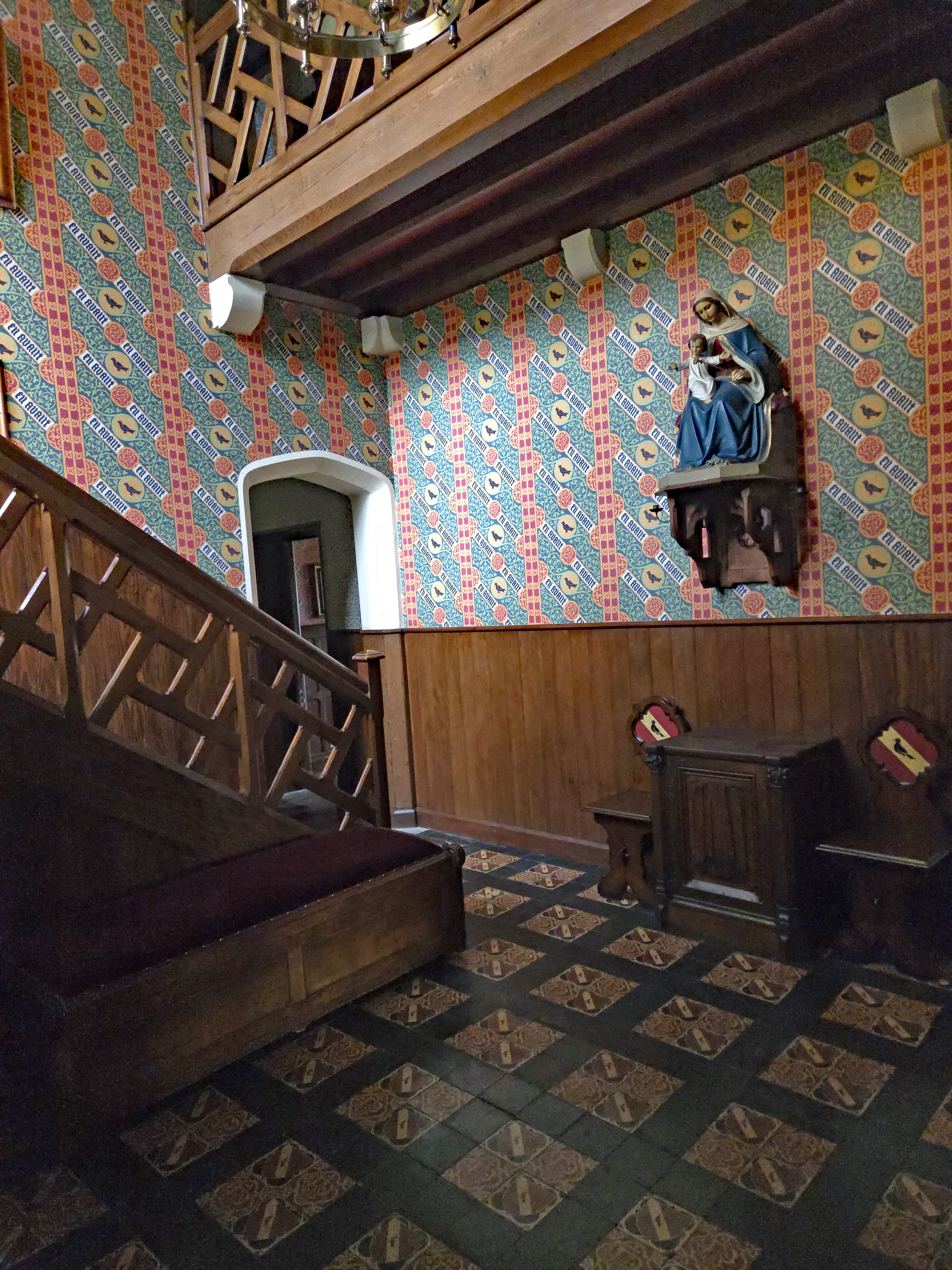
Entrance hall

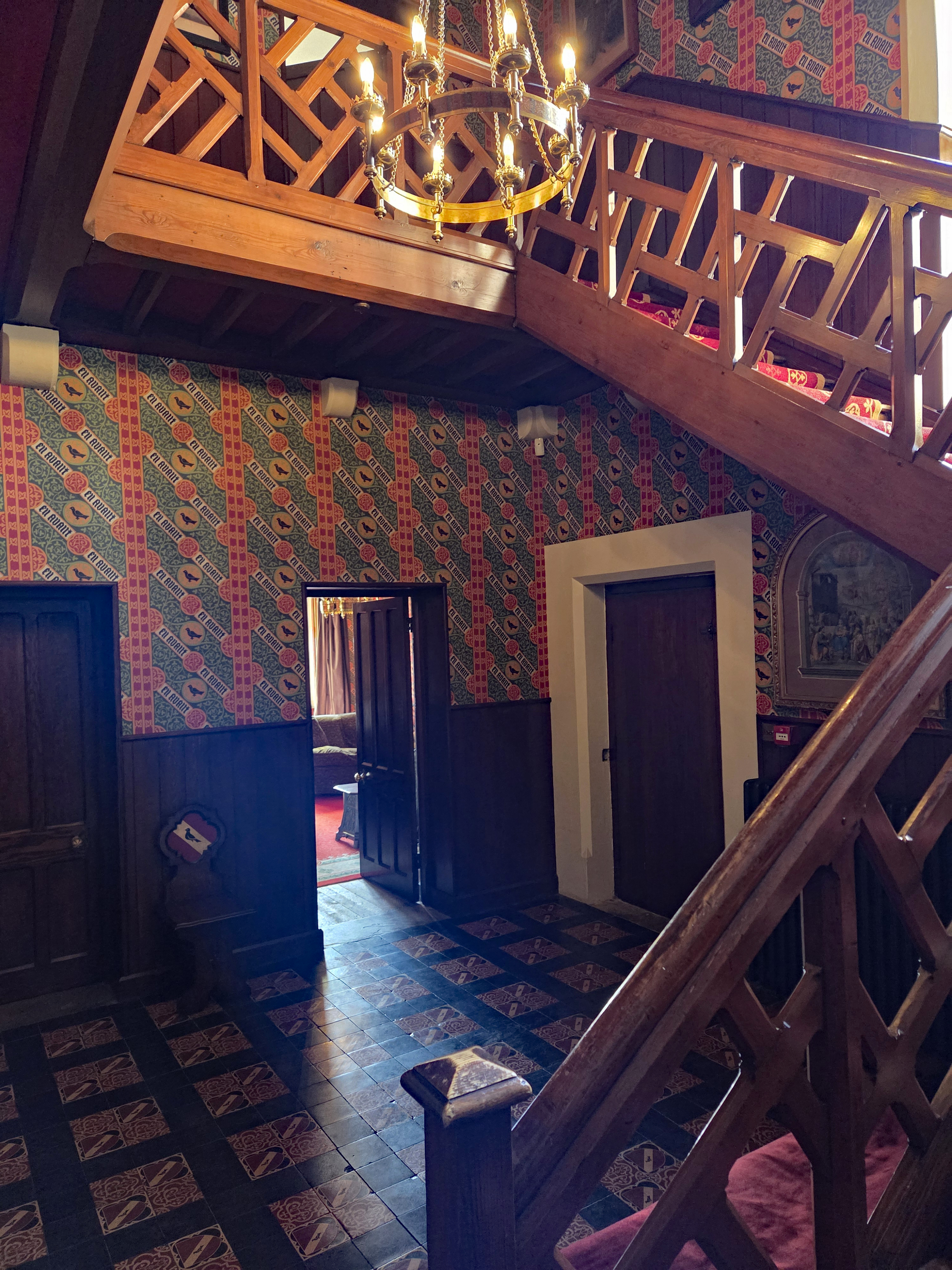
Entrance hall, with stairs leading to the first floor

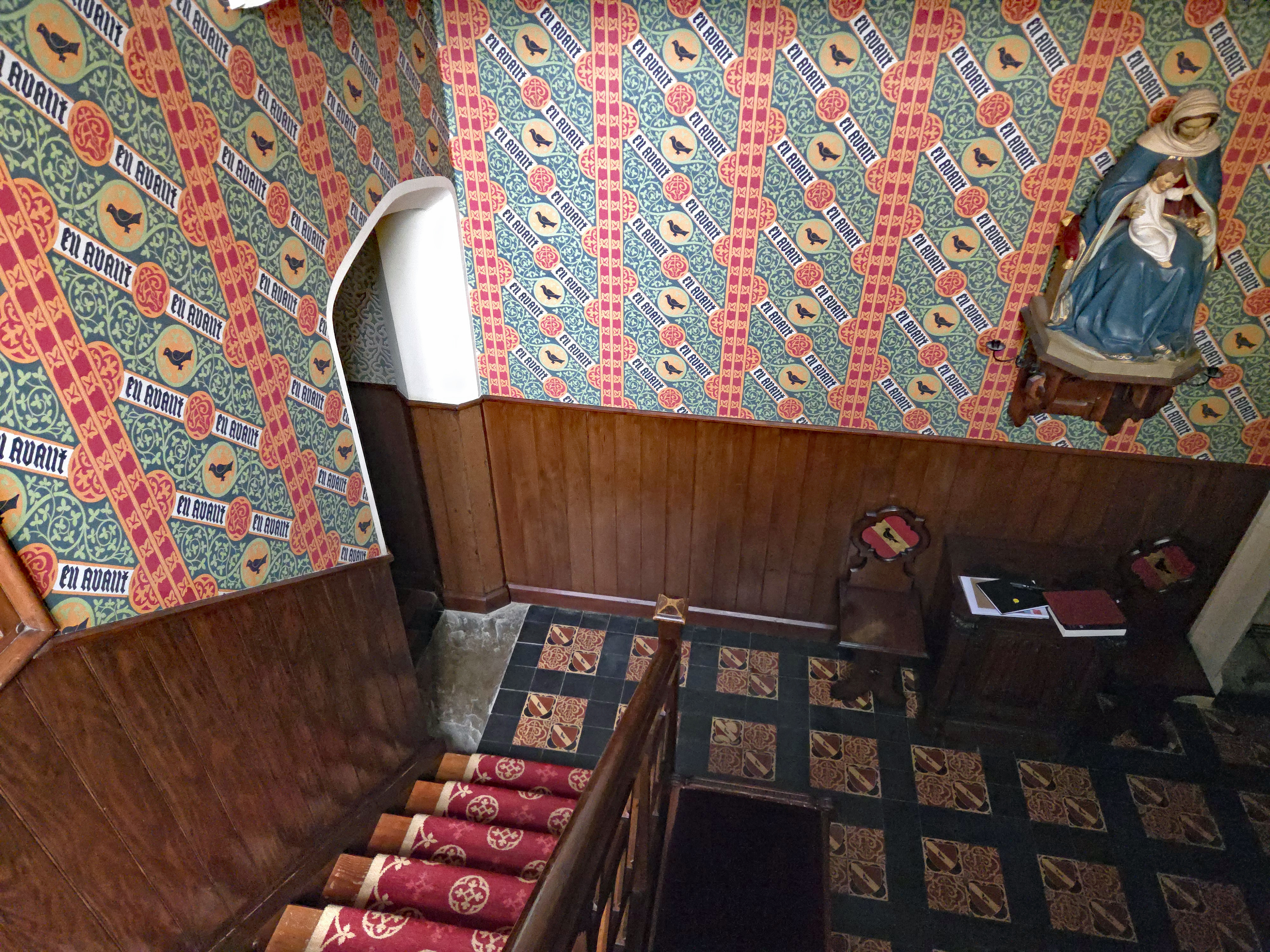
Entrance hall

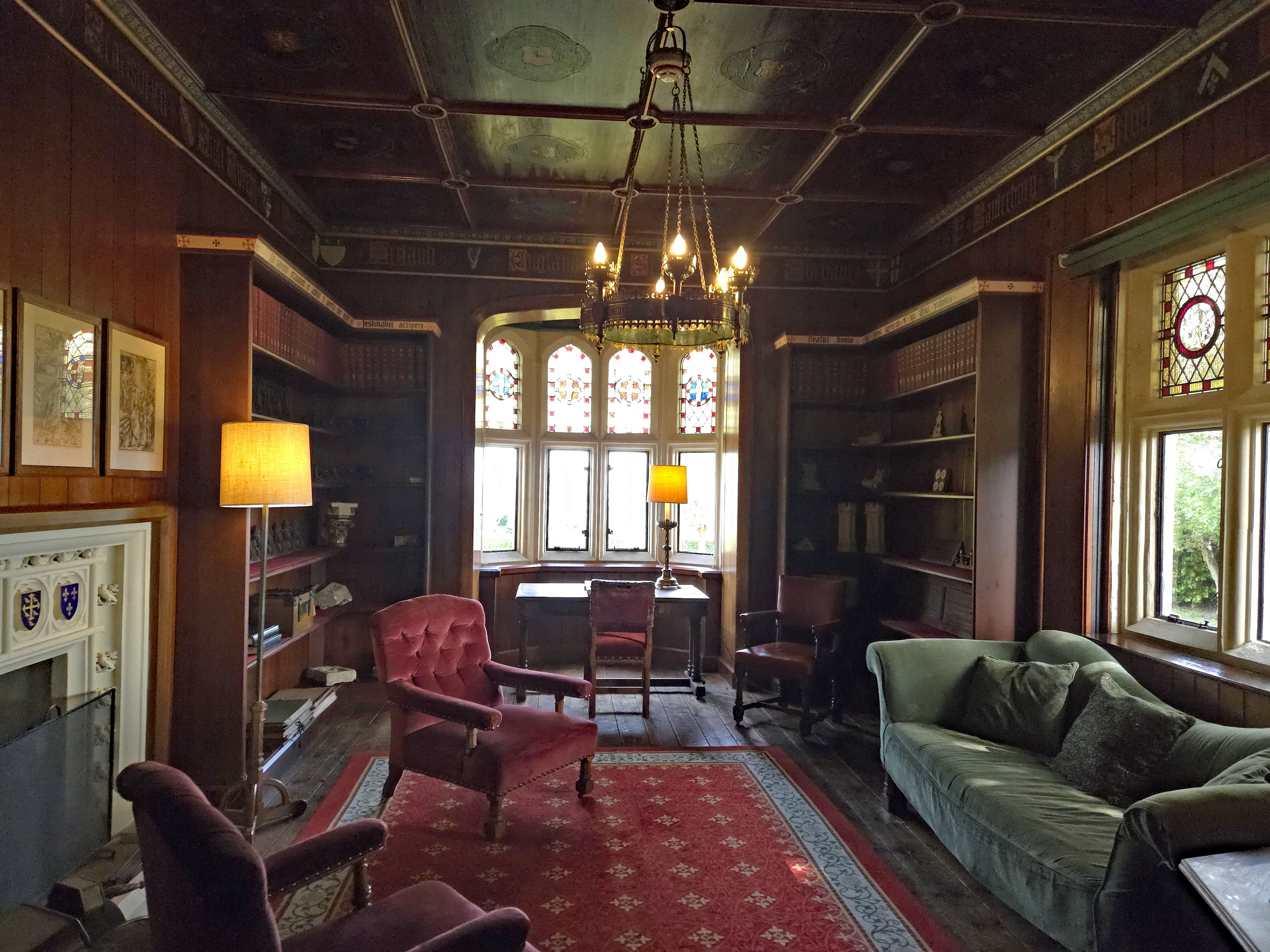
Library, Augustus Pugin's work room

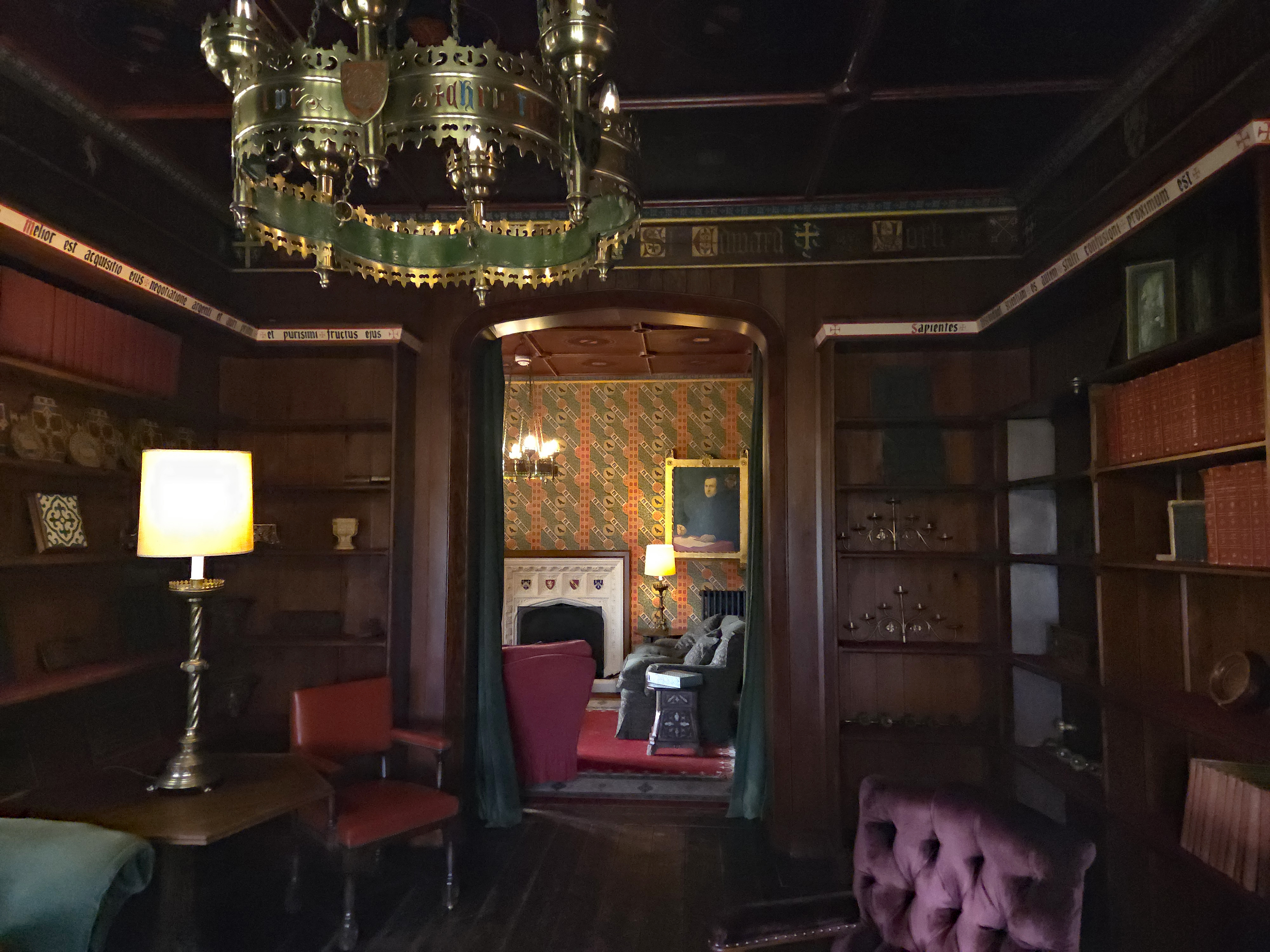
Library and sitting room

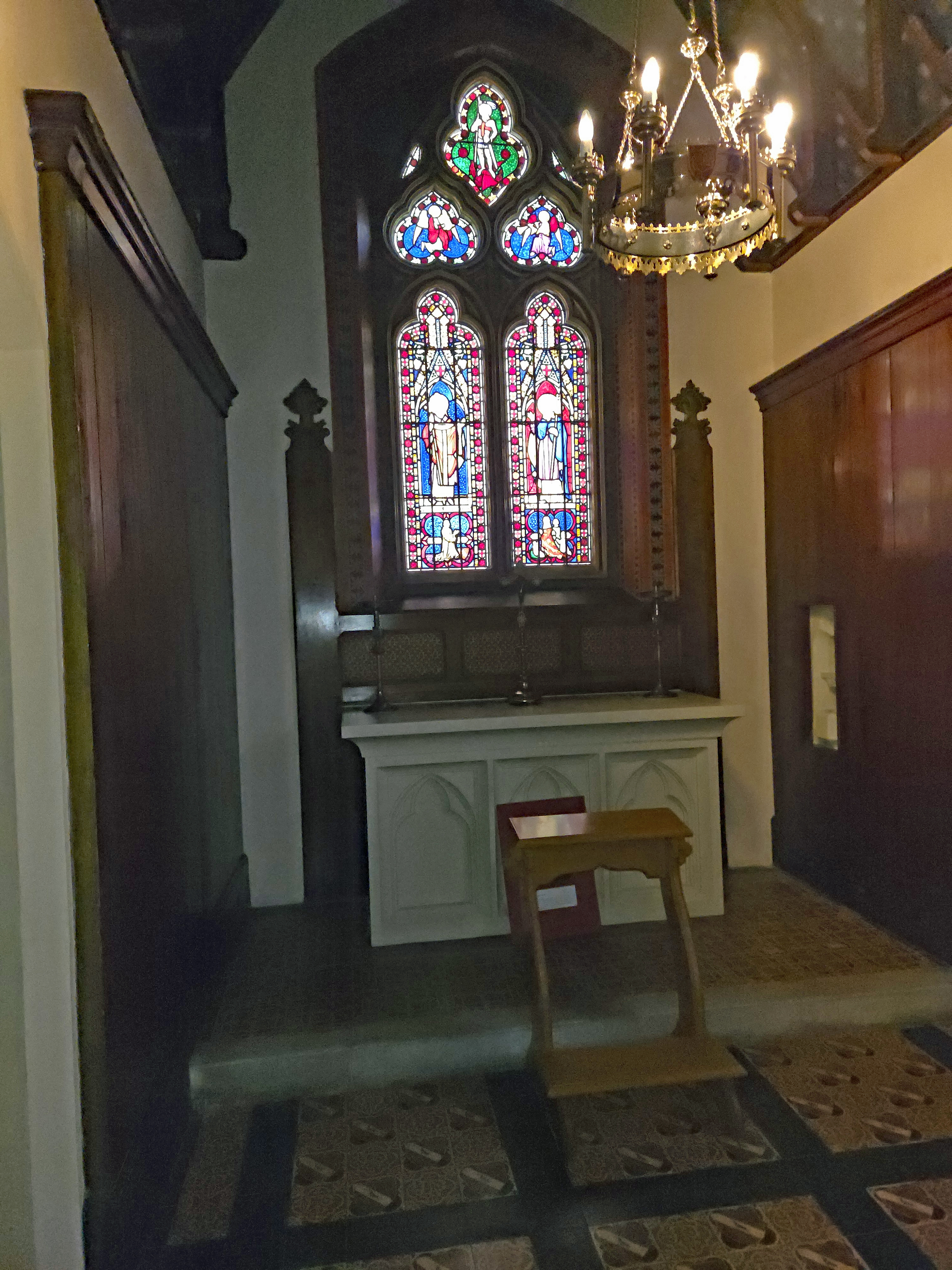
The Grange chapel

== See also ==
- Historic buildings in Ramsgate

== Sources ==
- Hill, Rosemary (2007). God's Architect: Pugin and the Building of Romantic Britain. London: Allen Lane. ISBN 978-0-7139-9499-5. OCLC 237020318.
- Newman, John (2013) [1969]. Kent: North-East and East. The Buildings Of England. New Haven, US and London: Yale University Press. ISBN 9780300185065. OCLC 857109148.
