= Ramsgate =

Seaside town in Kent, England

Coordinates: 51.336°N 1.416°E

- Town
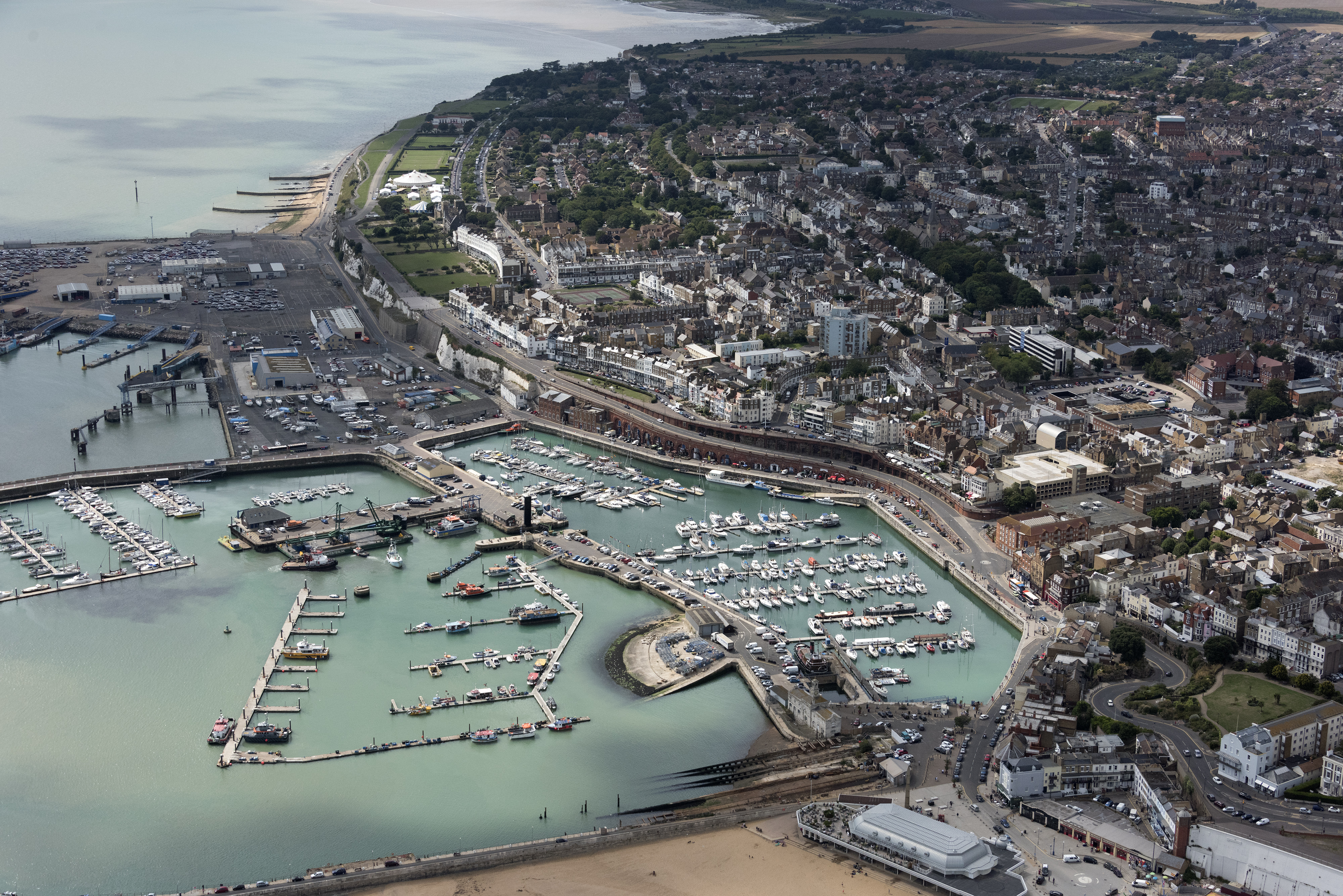
- Ramsgate's harbour, from the air.

- Location within Kent
- Interactive map of Ramsgate
- Area: 8.017 km^{2} (3.095 sq mi)
- Population: 42,027 (2021 Census)
  - Density: 5,242/km^{2} (13,580/sq mi)
- Demonym: Ramsgatonian
- OS grid reference: TR382648
- Civil parish: Ramsgate
- District: Thanet
- Shire county: Kent
- Region: South East
- Country: England
- Sovereign state: United Kingdom
- Post town: Ramsgate
- Postcode district: CT11, CT12
- Dialling code: 01843
- Police: Kent
- Fire: Kent
- Ambulance: South East Coast
- UK Parliament: East Thanet

Ramsgate is a seaside port town and civil parish in the district of Thanet in eastern Kent, England. It was one of the great English seaside towns of the 19th century. In 2021 it had a population of 42,027. Ramsgate's main attraction is its coastline, and its main industries are tourism and fishing. The town has one of the largest marinas on the English south coast, and the Port of Ramsgate provided cross-channel ferries for many years.

== History ==
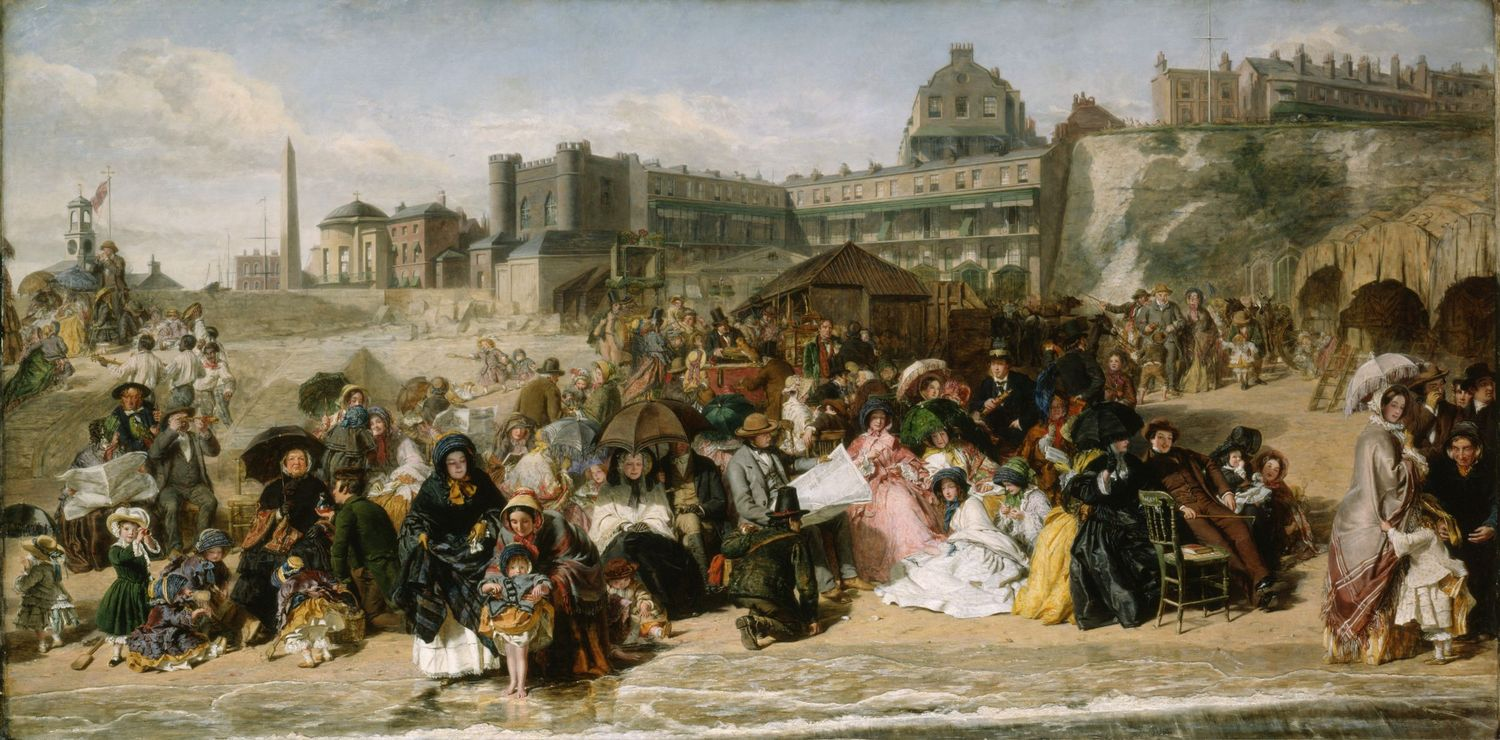
Ramsgate Sands in 1854, by William Powell Frith

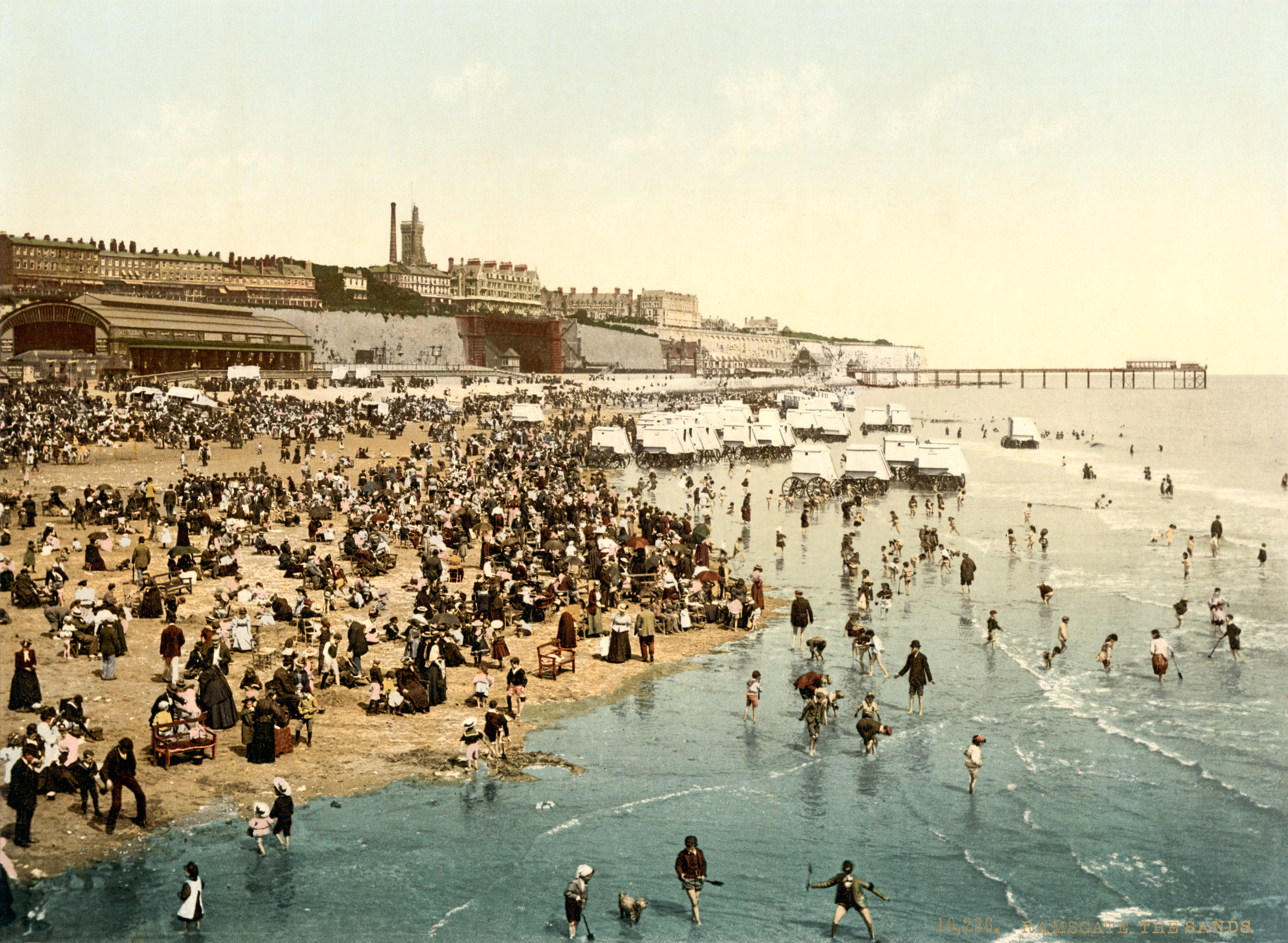
Photochrom of a crowded beach, 1899

Ramsgate began as a fishing and farming hamlet. The Christian missionary St Augustine, sent by Pope Gregory the Great, landed near Ramsgate in AD 597. The town is home to the Shrine of St Augustine.

The earliest reference to the town is in the Kent Hundred Rolls of 1274–5, both as Remmesgate (in the local personal name of 'Christina de Remmesgate') and as Remisgat (with reference to the town). The names Ramisgate and Raunsgate appear in the parish of St. Laurence records c. 1290. These are all derived from late Anglo-Saxon 'Hremmes' from earlier 'Hræfnes' (raven's) and 'geat' (gate), with reference to the gap in the cliffs. In 1357, the area became known as Ramesgate.

Ramsgate was a member of the confederation of Cinque Ports, as a "limb" (subordinate member) of Sandwich. The construction of Ramsgate Harbour began in 1749 and was completed in around 1850. The harbour has the distinction of being the only Royal Harbour in the United Kingdom. Because of its proximity to mainland Europe, Ramsgate was a chief embarkation point both during the Napoleonic Wars and for the Dunkirk evacuation in 1940.

The Official Illustrated Guide to South-Eastern and North and Mid-Kent Railways (June 1863) by George Measom describes Ramsgate thus: "It is impossible to speak too favourably of this first-rate town, its glorious sands, its bathing, its hotels, libraries, churches, etc. etc. not forgetting its bracing climate...The streets of Ramsgate are well paved or macadamed and brilliantly lighted with gas."

The architect Augustus Pugin and his sons lived in Ramsgate and built several important buildings there, including St Augustine's Church, The Grange, St Augustine's Abbey, and The Granville Hotel.

The artist Vincent van Gogh moved to Ramsgate in April 1876, at age 23. He boarded at 11 Spencer Square, which is identified by a blue plaque. He obtained work as a teacher at a local school in Royal Road, where he received his post. In one of his letters to his brother Theo, he described his surroundings: "There's a harbour full of all kinds of ships, closed in by stone jetties running into the sea on which one can walk. And further out one sees the sea in its natural state, and that's beautiful."

In 1901, an electric tram service, one of the few inter-urban tramways in Britain, was introduced on the Isle of Thanet. The towns of Ramsgate, Margate and Broadstairs were linked by 11 miles of track.

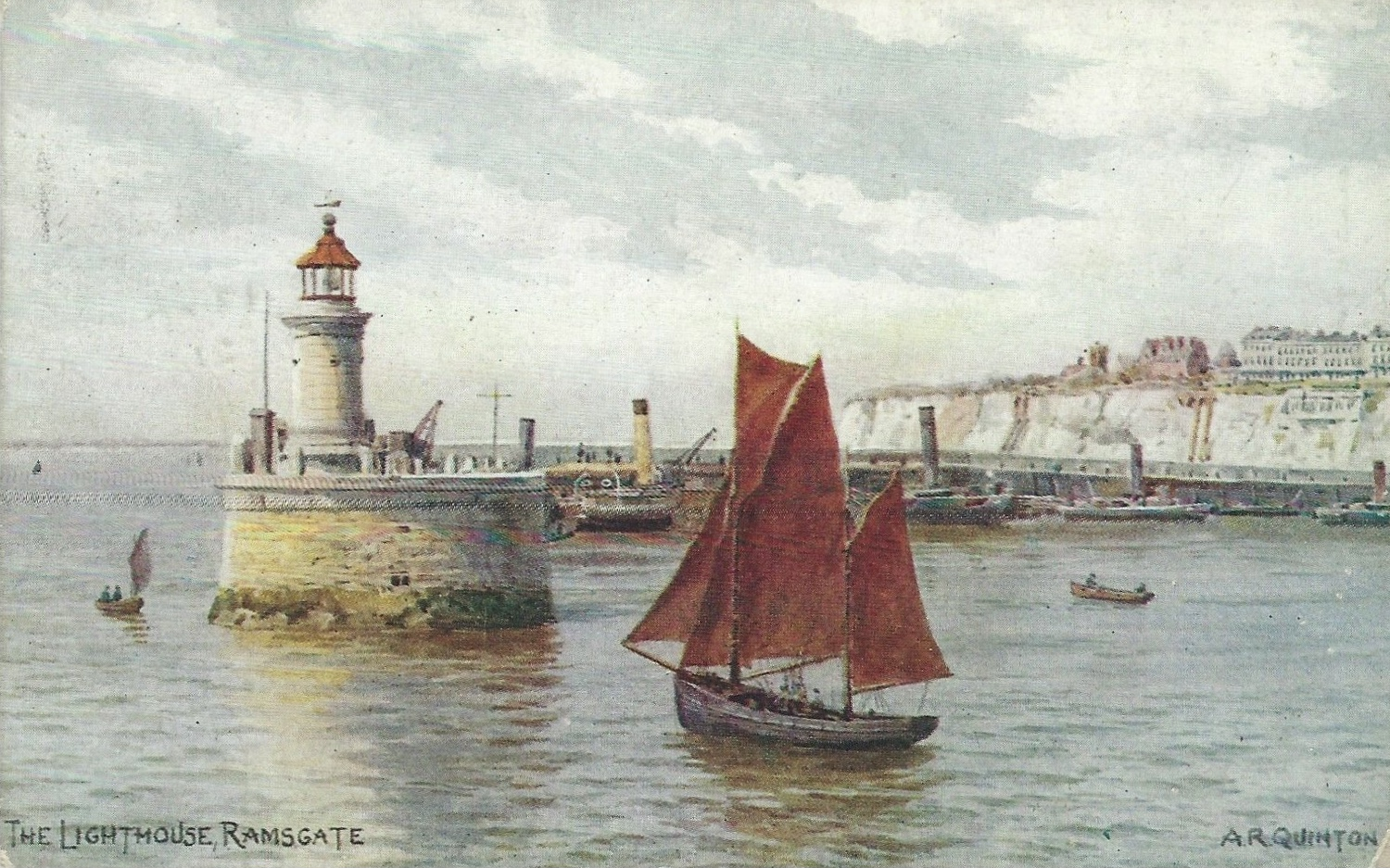
The Lighthouse Ramsgate by A.R. Quinton (postcard marked 1921)

In the First World War, in 1915–1916, early aircraft began to use the open farmland at Manston as a site for emergency landings. The location near the Kent coast gave Manston some advantages over other previously established aerodromes. During the same War, Ramsgate and its harbour were the target of bombing raids by Zeppelin airships and German Navy torpedo boats. By 1917 the Royal Flying Corps was well established and taking an active part in the defence of Britain. As RAF Manston, the aerodrome played an important role in the Second World War. It is now called Kent International Airport, but is currently not operational.

In 1923, Ramsgate elected its first woman Mayor, Janet Stancomb-Wills, after whom the Dame Janet Primary Academy on Newington Road is named. As the Second World War approached, Ramsgate Borough Council embarked on plans to create a network of Deep Shelter tunnels linking to a former railway tunnel which would provide shelter for 60,000 people. The tunnels were opened on 1 June 1939. In 2014 (75 years later), part of this network was opened to visitors.

In October 1939, the Royal Navy established a Coastal Forces base at Ramsgate called HMS Fervent, which operated Motor Torpedo Boats, Motor Gun Boats and Motor Launches until September 1945. From 27 May 1940, Ramsgate harbour was the main assembly point for the build-up of small craft needed for Operation Dynamo, the evacuation of the British Expeditionary Force from Dunkirk. Once the evacuation was under way, Ramsgate became the second-busiest port after Dover, and just under 43,000 men passed through the port, transported onwards by 82 special trains.

In 2017 Ramsgate was chosen as one of the first ten Heritage Action Zones (HAZ) by Historic England, with the aim of stimulating economic growth by taking advantage of Ramsgate's historic environment. Part of this project included a Historic Landscape Characterisation Study which assessed and mapped the patterns of historic character in the town, using geological and topographical surveys, and covering aspects from the Neolithic, medieval, Georgian, Victorian, and through to the First and Second World War periods.

== Geography ==
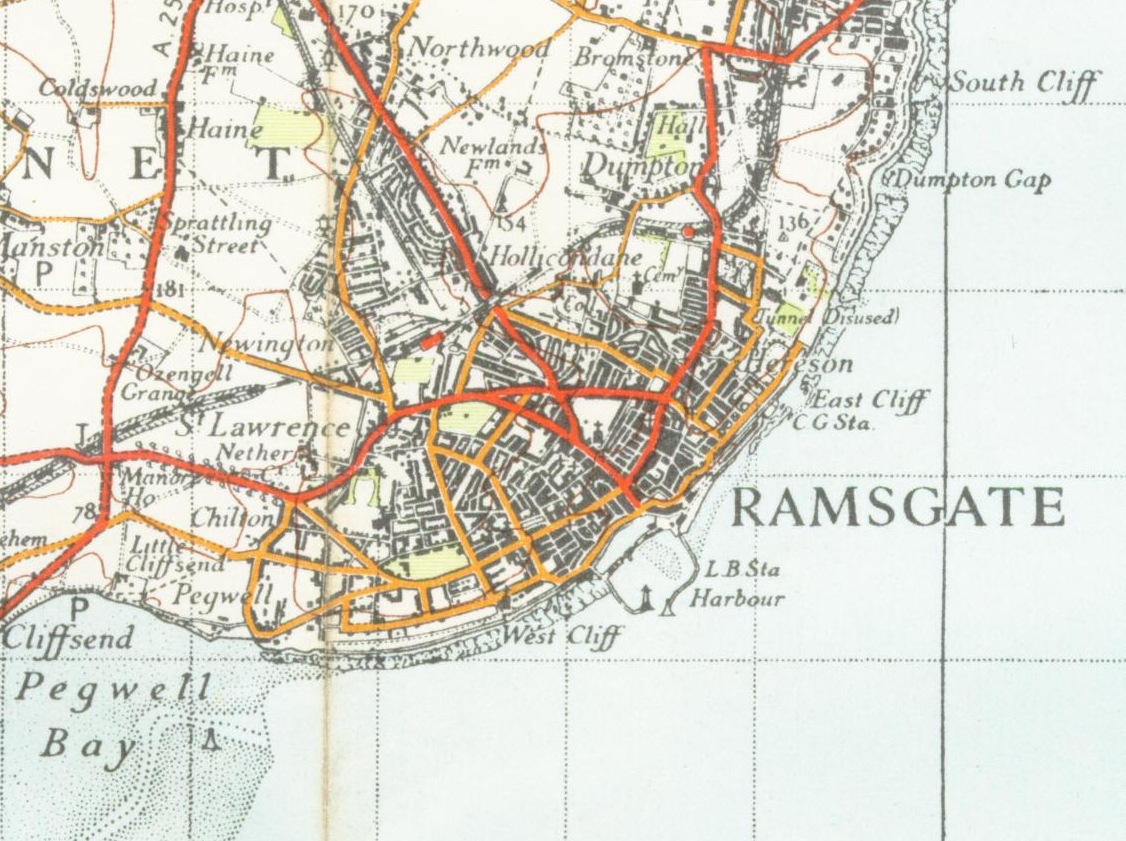
A map of Ramsgate from 1945

Ramsgate is located 78 miles from central London in an east south-easterly direction at one of the most easterly points of the United Kingdom (the furthest point east is Lowestoft in Suffolk).

The town is an amalgamation of two settlements: a fishing community on the coast in the shallow valley between two chalk cliffs, and an inland farming community that is now the Parish of St Lawrence. The cliffs are known as the East Cliff and the West Cliff and are predominantly residential areas. There are promenades along both cliff tops with parks at either end and sandy beaches on the coast.

=== Climate ===
Ramsgate has an oceanic climate (Köppen climate classification Cfb) as is typical in the United Kingdom; the nearest Met Office weather station for which data is available is Manston Airport, about two miles west of the town centre.

The highest temperature ever recorded is 34.6 °C (94.3 °F) in August 2003, though typically the warmest day of the year averages 28.5 °C (83.3 °F) and 8.8 days will record a temperature of 25.1 °C (77.2 °F) or above.

The lowest recorded temperature is -14.5 °C (5.9 °F), in February 1986, though typically the coldest night of the year averages -6.2 °C (20.8 °F). A total of 21.4 days of the year should record an air frost.

Rainfall averages around 600 mm per year, a figure similar to that for the driest parts of England. Over 1 mm of rain can be expected on 110.1 days. Averages refer to a mixture of the 1971–2000, 1981–2010 and 1991–2020 climate periods.

Being close to the coast, and in Southern England, sunshine compares favourably with most of the United Kingdom, at over 1800 hours a year. Only the Sussex coast tends to be notably sunnier, although much of the remainder of the south coast receives a similar amount of sunshine as Ramsgate.

Climate data for Manston, elevation 54m, 1991–2020, extremes 1960–
Month	Jan	Feb	Mar	Apr	May	Jun	Jul	Aug	Sep	Oct	Nov	Dec	Year
Record high °C (°F)	16.4 (61.5)	16.8 (62.2)	20.2 (68.4)	25.0 (77.0)	29.6 (85.3)	31.2 (88.2)	33.6 (92.5)	34.6 (94.3)	29.6 (85.3)	24.9 (76.8)	18.0 (64.4)	15.9 (60.6)	34.6 (94.3)
Mean daily maximum °C (°F)	7.6 (45.7)	7.9 (46.2)	10.3 (50.5)	13.2 (55.8)	16.3 (61.3)	19.5 (67.1)	22.1 (71.8)	22.2 (72.0)	19.2 (66.6)	15.1 (59.2)	11.0 (51.8)	8.3 (46.9)	14.4 (57.9)
Daily mean °C (°F)	5.1 (41.2)	5.2 (41.4)	7.1 (44.8)	9.5 (49.1)	12.5 (54.5)	15.5 (59.9)	17.9 (64.2)	18.1 (64.6)	15.6 (60.1)	12.1 (53.8)	8.3 (46.9)	5.8 (42.4)	11.1 (51.9)
Mean daily minimum °C (°F)	2.6 (36.7)	2.5 (36.5)	3.9 (39.0)	5.8 (42.4)	8.7 (47.7)	11.4 (52.5)	13.7 (56.7)	14.0 (57.2)	11.9 (53.4)	9.1 (48.4)	5.6 (42.1)	3.2 (37.8)	7.7 (45.9)
Record low °C (°F)	−12 (10)	−14.5 (5.9)	−6 (21)	−3.7 (25.3)	−1.1 (30.0)	0.9 (33.6)	6.4 (43.5)	5.4 (41.7)	2.2 (36.0)	−3.1 (26.4)	−6 (21)	−8.8 (16.2)	−14.5 (5.9)
Average precipitation mm (inches)	51.2 (2.02)	41.0 (1.61)	36.1 (1.42)	37.8 (1.49)	47.6 (1.87)	46.5 (1.83)	47.4 (1.87)	50.7 (2.00)	48.8 (1.92)	73.7 (2.90)	69.3 (2.73)	62.6 (2.46)	612.6 (24.12)
Average precipitation days (≥ 1.0 mm)	10.9	9.7	7.9	7.9	8.3	7.6	7.1	8.1	7.6	11.3	11.7	11.9	110.1
Mean monthly sunshine hours	65.6	84.1	134.5	195.8	230.8	235.4	242.7	225.3	172.2	122.3	77.3	60.0	1,846
Source 1: Met Office
Source 2: KNMI

== Governance ==
Ramsgate is in the parliamentary constituency of East Thanet, which is represented by Labour MP Polly Billington. She won the seat in the 2024 general election, representing a Labour win after Craig Mackinlay held the seat for the Conservatives in the 2015 General Election. Before 2015 the MP for Ramsgate was Conservative Laura Sandys. She was preceded by Stephen Ladyman, a Labour minister; he was preceded by Jonathan Aitken.

Ramsgate was incorporated as a municipal borough in 1884. This was abolished in 1974, since when Ramsgate has been part of the Thanet local government district. The town is made up of seven electoral wards: Central Harbour, Cliffsend and Pegwell, Eastcliff, Nethercourt, Newington, Northwood, and Sir Moses Montefiore. These wards have seventeen of the fifty-six seats on the Thanet District Council; since the 2019 local elections eleven of those seats have been held by Labour, three by Thanet Independents, two by the Conservative Party and one by the Green Party. Currently the council is run by a Conservative minority.

Following a successful campaign by local activist Gerry O'Donnell, a town council was established for Ramsgate in June 2009. The Town Mayor of Ramsgate is currently Councillor Raushan Ara.

== Economy ==
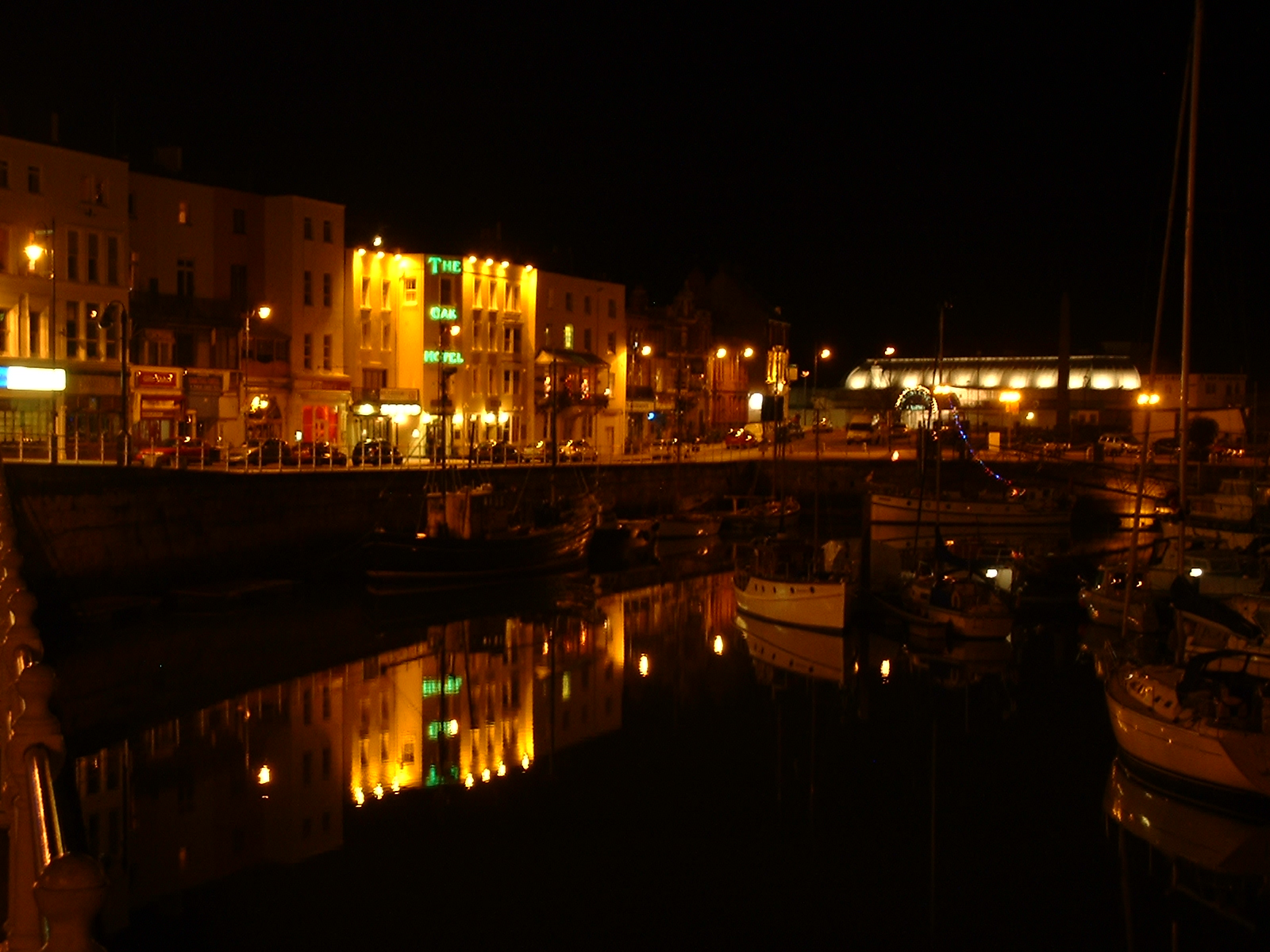
Ramsgate marina, location of many popular bars and pubs

Ramsgate's main industries are tourism and fishing. The town has a thriving marina with over 800 moorings and a range of marine-related businesses that operate in the renovated arches under Royal Parade. Colleges in the town also cater for students of English as a foreign language.

Although Ramsgate has the most valuable fish landings in Kent (~£700,000 in 2003), the fishing industry is in decline. The Port of Ramsgate has provided cross-channel ferries for many years. Previously, Sally Ferries UK provided a passenger and car ferry service to Dunkirk. Until April 2013, Transeuropa Ferries operated a freight and car ferry between Ramsgate and Ostend in Belgium.

As of 2006, unemployment in Thanet stood at 4.1%; this is higher than the national average (2.5%). There is some light industry in the town. An emerging industry is power generation, with 800 jobs expected to be created by the Thanet offshore wind project, a wind farm just off the coast. Ramsgate market is held in High Street, King Street and Queen Street every Friday and Saturday.

Ramsgate has a LETS scheme (RAMLETS) which was set up in 2014 enabling residents to trade goods and services using the virtual currency RAMs. It is working with the Newington Wellbeing Network to improve the lives of people living in the Newington ward of Ramsgate.

== Demographics ==
Ramsgate compared
2021 UK Census	Ramsgate	Thanet District	England
Total population	42,027	140,600	49,138,831
Foreign born	9.1%	9.8%	16%
White	93.5%	93.0%	81%
Asian	2.3%	0.6%	8.6%
Black	0.9%	0.3%	3.7%
Christian	45%	50%	46%
Muslim	1.2%	1.5%	6.5%
Hindu	0.6%	0.6%	1.7%
No religion	52%	47%	37%
Over 65 years old	19.8%	23.7%	19%

According to the 2001 UK census,

Ramsgate had a population of 42,027.

The ethnicity of the town was 93.5% white, 0.8% mixed race, 0.3% black, 0.3% Chinese, 0.4% other Asian and 0.1% other ethnicity.

The place of birth of residents was 90.9% United Kingdom, 4.7% EU, 1% Far East, 1.8% Africa, 0.9% Other.

Religion was recorded as 45% Christian, 1.2% Muslim, 0.6% Hindu, 0.4% Buddhist, 0.1% Sikh and 0.2% Jewish. 52% were recorded as having no religion, 0.3% had an alternative religion and 7.1% did not state their religion.

For every 100 women, there were 93.7 men. The age distribution was 21.5% aged 0–17 years, 56% aged 17–65 years, 24% and 20% aged 65 years and over.

== Culture ==
=== Tourism ===
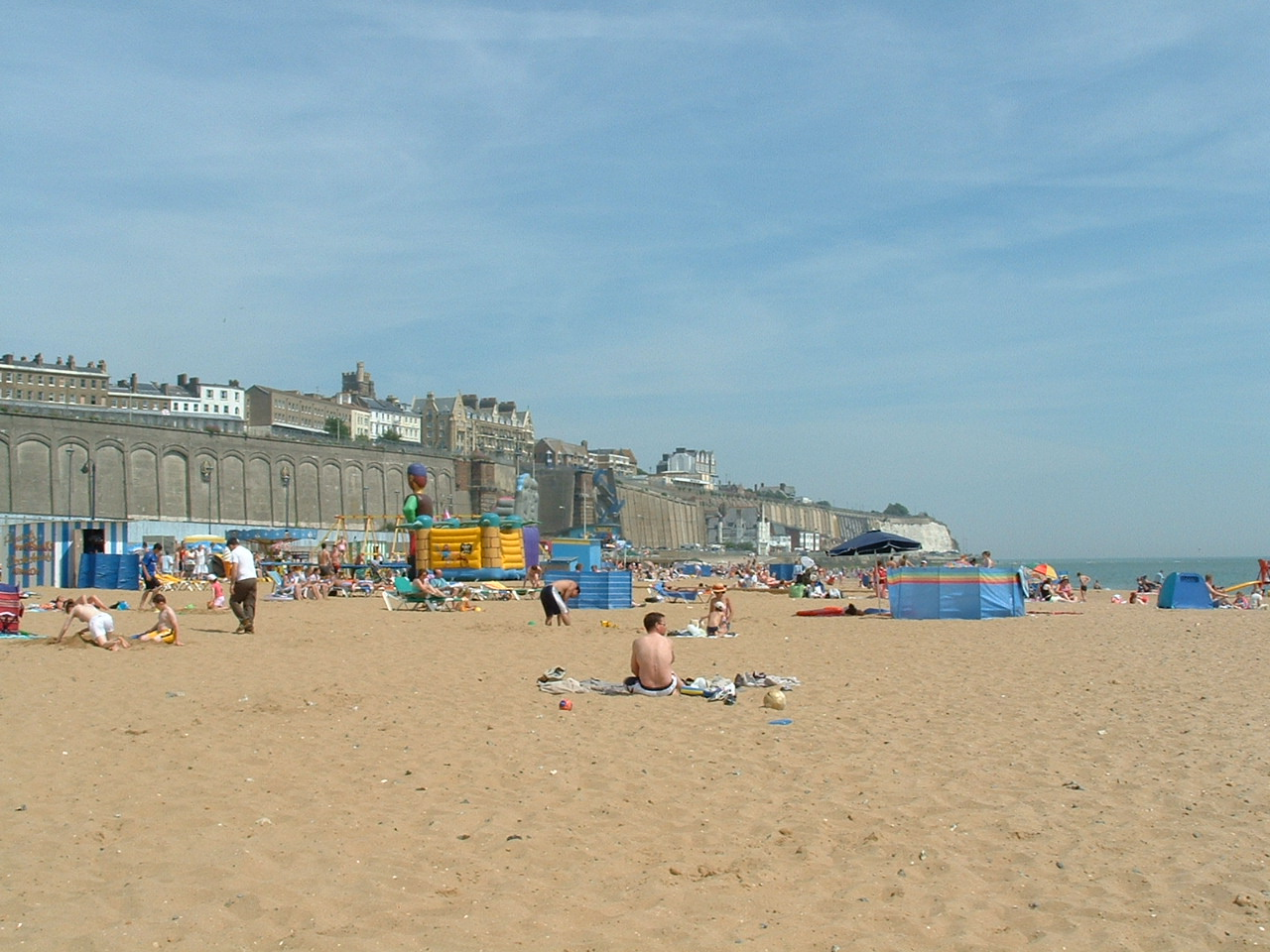
Ramsgate Main Sands

The town's main attraction is its coastline, particularly Ramsgate Main Sands, which was awarded a Blue Flag in 2015. Ramsgate's wartime deep shelter tunnels are open to the public for tours, which have been running since 2014.

The town has a small population of feral rose-ringed parakeets. The story about them appearing in Ramsgate remains a mystery. According to some sources, they may have flown away from the trading ships coming from British India in the 1800s. The local council publishes a website specifically aimed at tourists visiting Ramsgate and neighbouring towns.

There is an annual regatta event during the summer. Ramsgate Carnival is an annual parade that takes place during the summer. Other events include the annual Addington Street Fair and the French Market.

=== Sport ===
The town's main football club, Ramsgate FC, plays in the Isthmian League Division One South. The local rivals of the club are Margate FC, situated 4 miles away. When the two teams meet, it is known as the Thanet Derby. The club run a reserves team, which plays in the Kent Football League Second Division, and a women's team, which plays in the South East Counties Women's League Kent County Division. Ramsgate FC run five youth teams; the under-13 to under-18 teams compete in the Valley Express Kent Youth League and the club also runs Ramsgate Youth U7 to U16, which play in the Molten East Kent Youth League. Two other youth teams in Ramsgate are Trinity and Hugin Vikings; both play in The Molten East Kent Youth League.

Thanet Wanderers is the island's only rugby team and has played at London Division 1 level, achieving its best result by defeating Doncaster at Twickenham in the final of the Intermediate Cup in 1997. The club runs five senior sides and many junior teams, all of which play at St Peter's. Cliftonville Hockey Club plays its home matches at St Lawrence College and has a clubhouse that it shares with Broadstairs Cricket Club.

Thanet Galaxy is a pan-disability football club that provides structured coaching for male and female footballers of all ages, who qualify within the nationally and internationally recognised Pan Disability categories. The club trains at Chatham House Grammar School and plays in Kent Disability Football League in three age bands: U-11, U-16, and 16+. In their first season (2008/2009), the adult A team won the Kent Disability League Adult Championship.

Ramsgate's sports facilities include Ramsgate Leisure Centre - a public swimming pool, fitness centre, gym and sports hall run by Your Leisure Kent Ltd. Tennis clubs can be found at Spencer Square and St Laurence. Ramsgate has three golf clubs: St Augustine's, Stonelees, and Manston. There is also a sailing club, the Royal Temple Yacht Club, which is steeped in yacht-racing history and hosts racing throughout the year for a variety of historic trophies. The highlight of the season is the annual international sailing regatta, known as 'Ramsgate Week', which is usually held in August.

=== Arts and local media ===
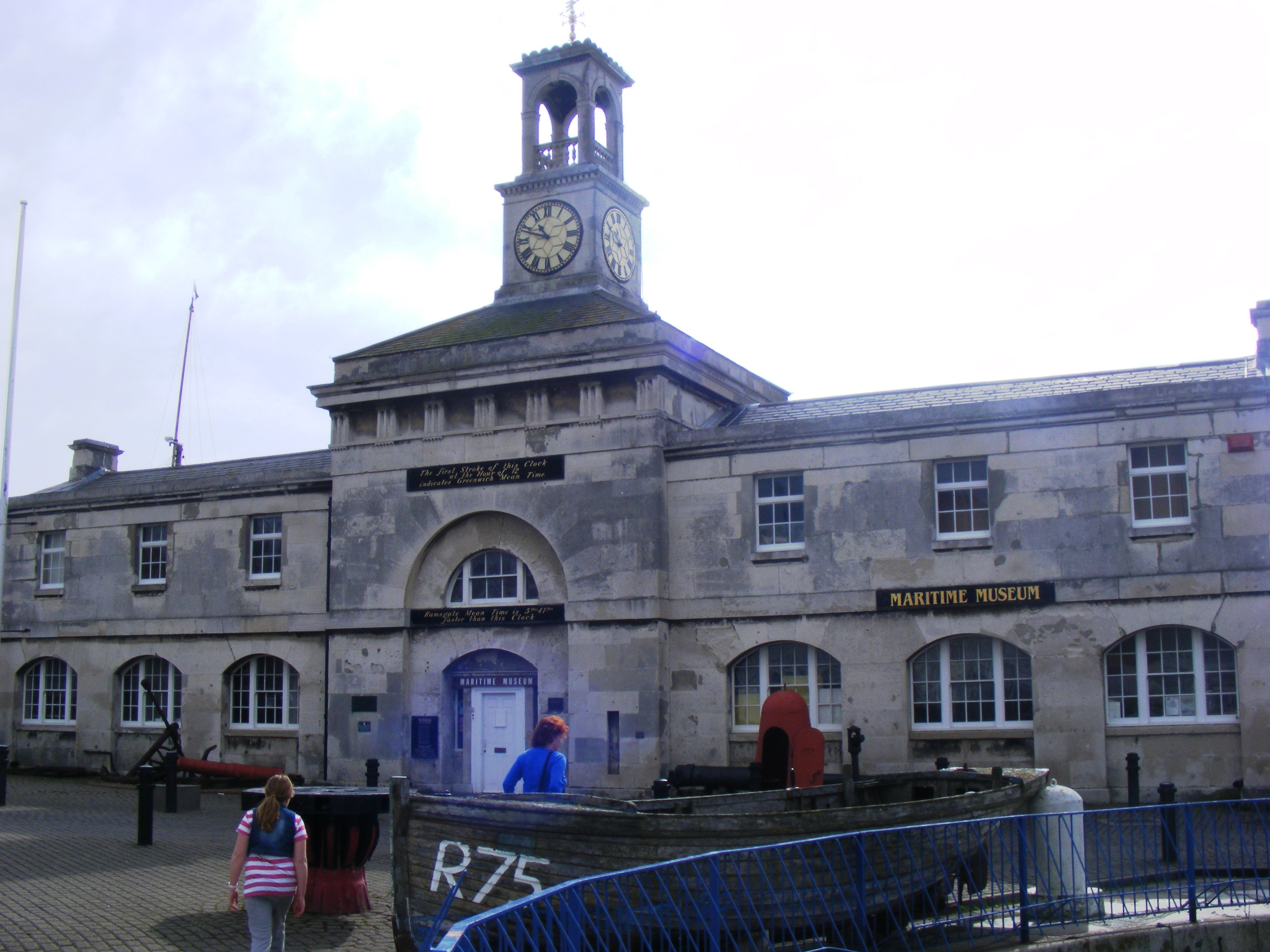
Ramsgate Maritime Museum

The Gallery IOTA (Isle Of Thanet Arts) was based on the town's west cliff but is now on the harbour front. Ramsgate Maritime Museum near the harbour quayside has exhibits showing the evolution of Ramsgate Harbour and east Kent maritime history. The Museum Building featured in the 2018 romantic comedy Juliet, Naked as the fictional Sandcliff Museum where the film's star Annie Platt (Rose Byrne) works. The King's Theatre, near the town centre, offers shows, community events and a seniors' club every Monday. Talks on Ramsgate's history are frequently held there.

Ramsgate has two paid-for newspapers, the Isle of Thanet Gazette and Thanet Times, both of which are owned by Northcliffe Media. Free newspapers covering the town include the Thanet Extra, part of the KM Group; and yourthanet, belonging to KOS Media.

Local news and television programmes are provided by BBC South East & ITV Meridian. Television signals are received from the Dover TV transmitter and the local relay transmitter situated in the town centre.

The local radio stations are KMFM Thanet, owned by the KM Group, community radio station Academy FM (Thanet), and the county-wide stations Heart South, Gold and BBC Radio Kent. Thanet Community Radio (TCR) offers an online arts- and features-based service for Thanet District and the surrounding area where people can listen to podcasts of local interest. The service works closely with Dover Community Radio.

=== Landmarks ===
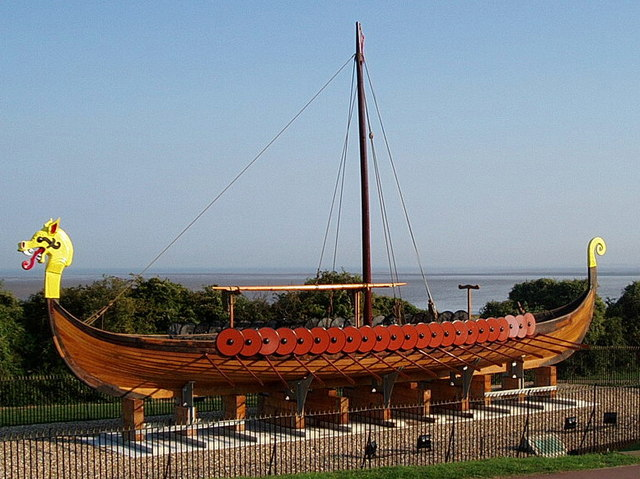
Hugin Viking longship in Pegwell

The Hugin is a reconstructed Viking longship located at Pegwell Bay in Ramsgate. It was a gift from the Danish government in commemoration of the 1500th anniversary of the legendary arrival of conquering brothers Hengist and Horsa to England in the year 449.

== Architecture ==
There are many Regency and Victorian buildings in Ramsgate. In all, there are 900 listed buildings in the town with more than 200 in the vicinity of the harbour. One of the town's most notable buildings is the 18th century Townley House designed by Mary Townley.

The town has three notable churches:

- The first building used for worship in the Thanet parish of St Lawrence was at St Laurence-in-Thanet; it was built in 1062 and rebuilt during the following centuries, with the most significant changes made in the 16th century. Note the difference in spelling between the village of St Lawrence and its church, which is dedicated to the Roman martyr Laurence.
- The second notable church is St Augustine's, on the town's West Cliff. It was designed by Augustus Pugin in 1847 in the Gothic Revival style. Its dedication commemorates Augustine, the first Archbishop of Canterbury, who landed at Ramsgate in AD 597 bringing Christianity to Britain. In March 2012 the church was designated a shrine to St Augustine of Canterbury; this ended a five-century absence of a shrine to St Augustine, as the original (at St Augustine's Abbey, Canterbury) had been destroyed during the Reformation.
- The town's parish church of St George is situated just off the High Street. Its lantern tower was added at the request of Trinity House as a navigational aid to passing ships, and it looks over the town. The ground was consecrated on 23 October 1827.

St Augustine's is part of the Roman Catholic Archdiocese of Southwark, whilst St Laurence and St George are both Church of England and serve the Anglican community as part of the Diocese of Canterbury. Christ Church, built in 1847, also serves the Anglican community.

Ramsgate library was originally built and paid for by Andrew Carnegie in 1904. On the evening of Friday 13 August 2004, it was destroyed by fire just two months short of its 100th anniversary. Though suspicions were raised about the causes of the fire, due to a similarly timed fire at Aberdeen House (the town's registry office), an investigation was unable to establish how the fire had started. Shortly after the blaze, planning permission was granted for a new library. The library was fully restored, and was officially re-opened on 20 February 2009.

== Transport ==
=== By sea ===
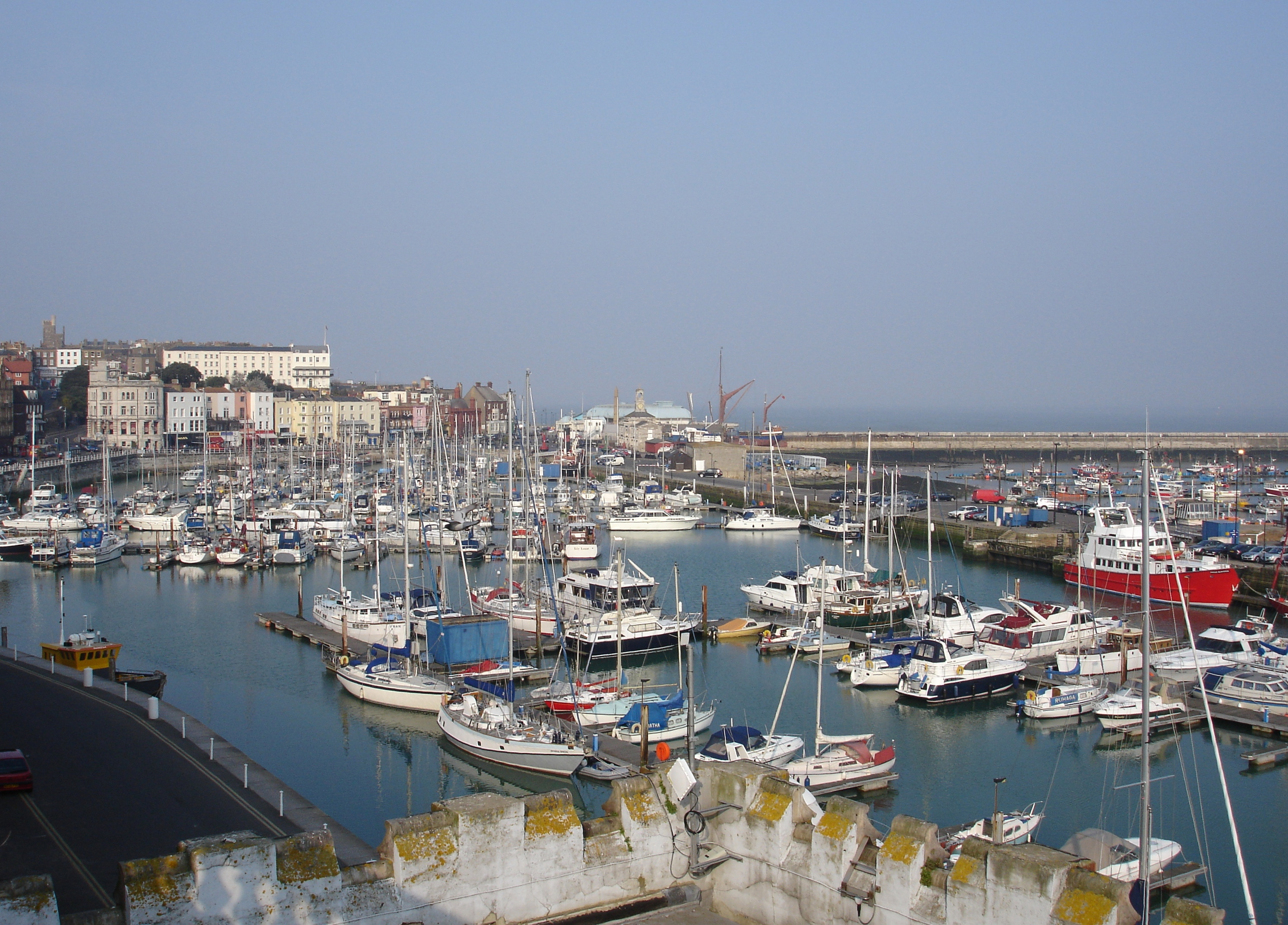
The Royal Harbour

The Port of Ramsgate has a 700 berth marina, Royal Harbour Marina, and a ferry terminal built on reclaimed land. The harbour provides shelter from the effects of storms. The Goodwin Sands are nearby. In 2005, the marina had 12,000 visiting boats. Transeuropa Ferries passenger (with vehicle only) and freight ferries sailed until April 2013 to the Port of Ostend in Ostend, Belgium. The Port of Ramsgate has its own road access tunnel from outside the town, avoiding town centre congestion. The Royal National Lifeboat Institution's Ramsgate Lifeboat Station is in Ramsgate Harbour.

=== By road ===
Ramsgate is connected to the national road network primarily through the A299 Thanet Way, which continues on to the M2/A2 for the M25 (approx 1 hour) and London. The A256 provides a link to Dover and onwards to the A20 for the Channel Tunnel. Bus services are provided by Stagecoach South East and also serve Broadstairs, Canterbury, Sandwich and Margate.

=== By rail ===
Ramsgate railway station is situated at the top of the town near the parish of St Lawrence.

A new high-speed service to London St Pancras started in December 2009, running on High Speed 1, the UK's first high-speed rail line, between London and Kent. The journey time from Ramsgate to St Pancras is 76 minutes.

In March 2015, it was announced that journey times between Ramsgate and London St Pancras are expected to be reduced to 63 minutes in 2019, due to infrastructure enhancements.

Other trains run from Ramsgate to London Charing Cross and London Victoria. Commuting time to the capital on these lines is approximately 1 hour 50 minutes.

Trains from Ramsgate are routed via Margate, Chatham and Bromley South, or via Canterbury West or Dover Priory and Ashford International. Ramsgate railway station is operated by Southeastern who operate all services.

Thanet Parkway railway station, opened on 31 July 2023, is situated near the village of Cliffsend just outside Ramsgate, and easily accessible by road off of the A299 (Hengist Way).

=== By air ===
A municipal airport was opened on 1 July 1935, operating until World War II broke out in 1939. Following a short spell as a satellite of RAF Manston, it closed in 1940. The airport was re-opened in 1952 and operated until closure in 1968.

From September 2004 to August 2005 a low-cost airline EUjet operated frequent flights to many European destinations, replacing a large freight operator. However, flights were suspended after the collapse of its parent company, PlaneStation Group plc.

Manston was sold to Infratil on 26 August 2005. Until May 2014, KLM Cityhopper operated two daily passenger flights from the airport to Amsterdam Airport Schiphol in the Netherlands. The airport was regularly used by freight operators such as Cargolux and Meridian.

The airport was sold to Ann Gloag in November 2013. She was reported to be seeking a buyer, but her spokesman reported that a buyer had not been found, and the airport closed on 15 May 2014.

If the airport were to resume operations, the town would be directly under the flight path.

== Education ==
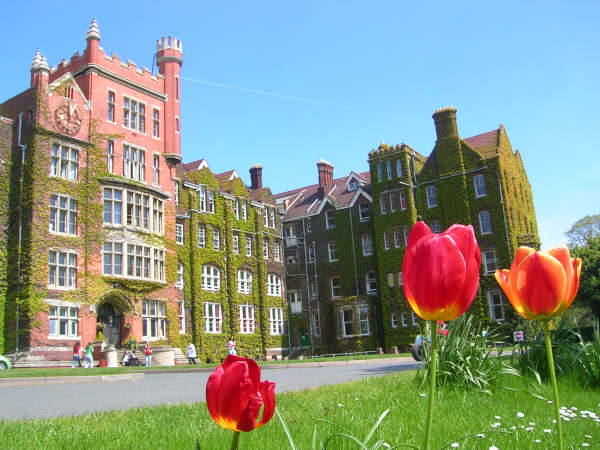
St Lawrence College public school in Ramsgate

Secondary schools

- Chatham and Clarendon Grammar School
- The Royal Harbour Academy
- St Lawrence College

Colleges and further education

- Ramsgate's nearest college is East Kent College. This is situated in the nearby town of Broadstairs.

== Twin towns ==
Ramsgate is twinned with:

- Conflans-Sainte-Honorine, France
- Chimay, Belgium
- Frederikssund, Denmark

== In popular culture ==
Author Russell Hoban repurposes Ramsgate as seat of government "The Ram" in his 1980, post apocalyptic novel Riddley Walker.

== See also ==
- Ramsgate lifeboat station Provides an inshore boat and an offshore boat.
- Ramsgate Harbour railway station
- Ramsgate Town railway station
- Ramsgate Cliff Railway
- List of people from Thanet#Ramsgate
- St Ethelbert's church, Ramsgate
- Ramsgate power station
