= Historic buildings in Ramsgate =

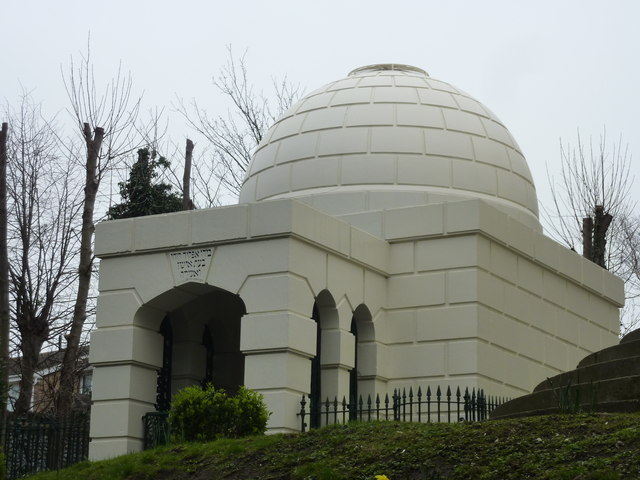
The Montefiore Mausoleum, next to the Montefiore Synagogue, built as a replica of Rachel's Tomb.

Ramsgate is a seaside town in the district of Thanet in east Kent, England, with a population of 39,639 in the '2001 UK Census. It was one of the great English seaside towns of the 19th century. Ramsgate's main attraction is its coastline, and its main industries are tourism and fishing. The town has one of the largest marinas on the English south coast, and the Port of Ramsgate provided cross-channel ferries for many years.

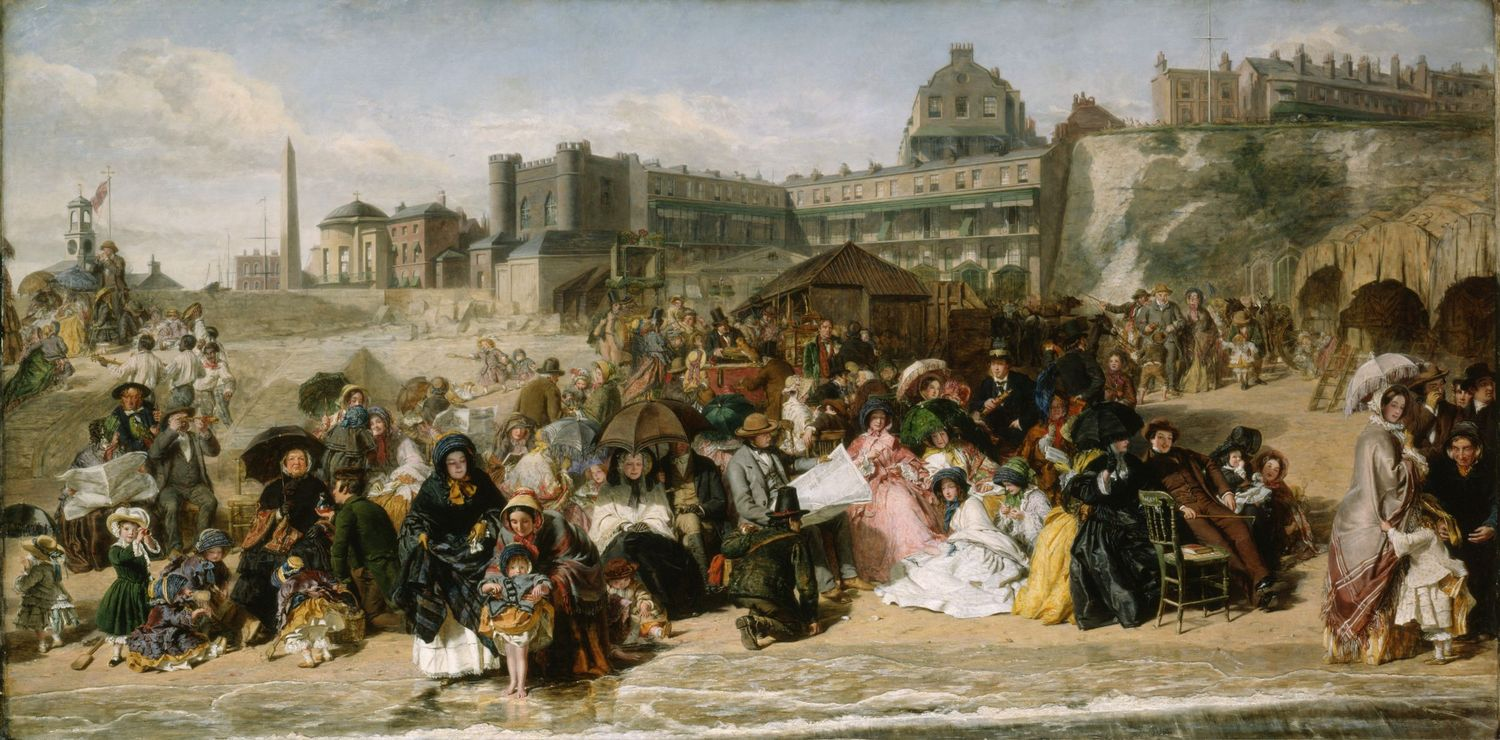
Ramsgate Sands in 1854, by William Powell Frith

The Christian missionary St Augustine, sent by Pope Gregory the Great, landed near Ramsgate in 597AD. The town is home to the Shrine of St Augustine.

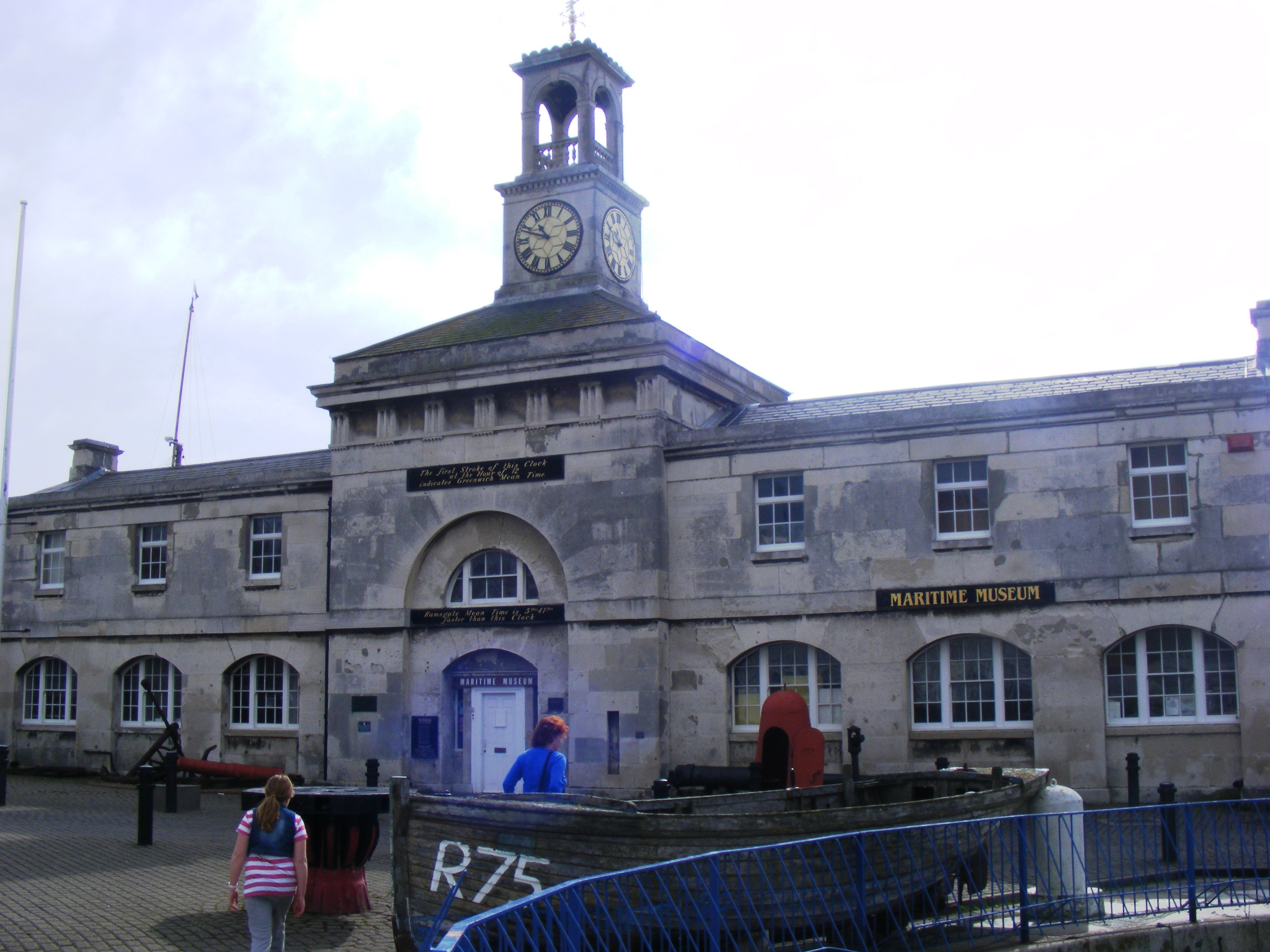
What is now Ramsgate Maritime Museum, 1817

Ramsgate was a member of the Confederation of Cinque Ports, under the 'Limb' of Sandwich, Kent. The construction of Ramsgate Harbour began in 1749 and was completed in around 1850. The harbour has the distinction of being the only Royal Harbour in the United Kingdom. Because of its proximity to mainland Europe, Ramsgate was a chief embarkation point both during the Napoleonic Wars and for the Dunkirk evacuation in 1940. The Official Illustrated Guide to South-Eastern and North and Mid-Kent Railways (June 1863) by George Measom from describes Ramsgate thus: 'It is impossible to speak too favourably of this first-rate town, its glorious sands, its bathing, its hotels, libraries, churches, etc. etc. not forgetting its bracing climate...The streets of Ramsgate are well paved or macadamed and brilliantly lighted with gas.'

The architect A W Pugin and his sons lived in Ramsgate and built several important buildings there, including St Augustine's Church, The Grange, St Augustine's Abbey, and The Granville Hotel.

== Churches ==
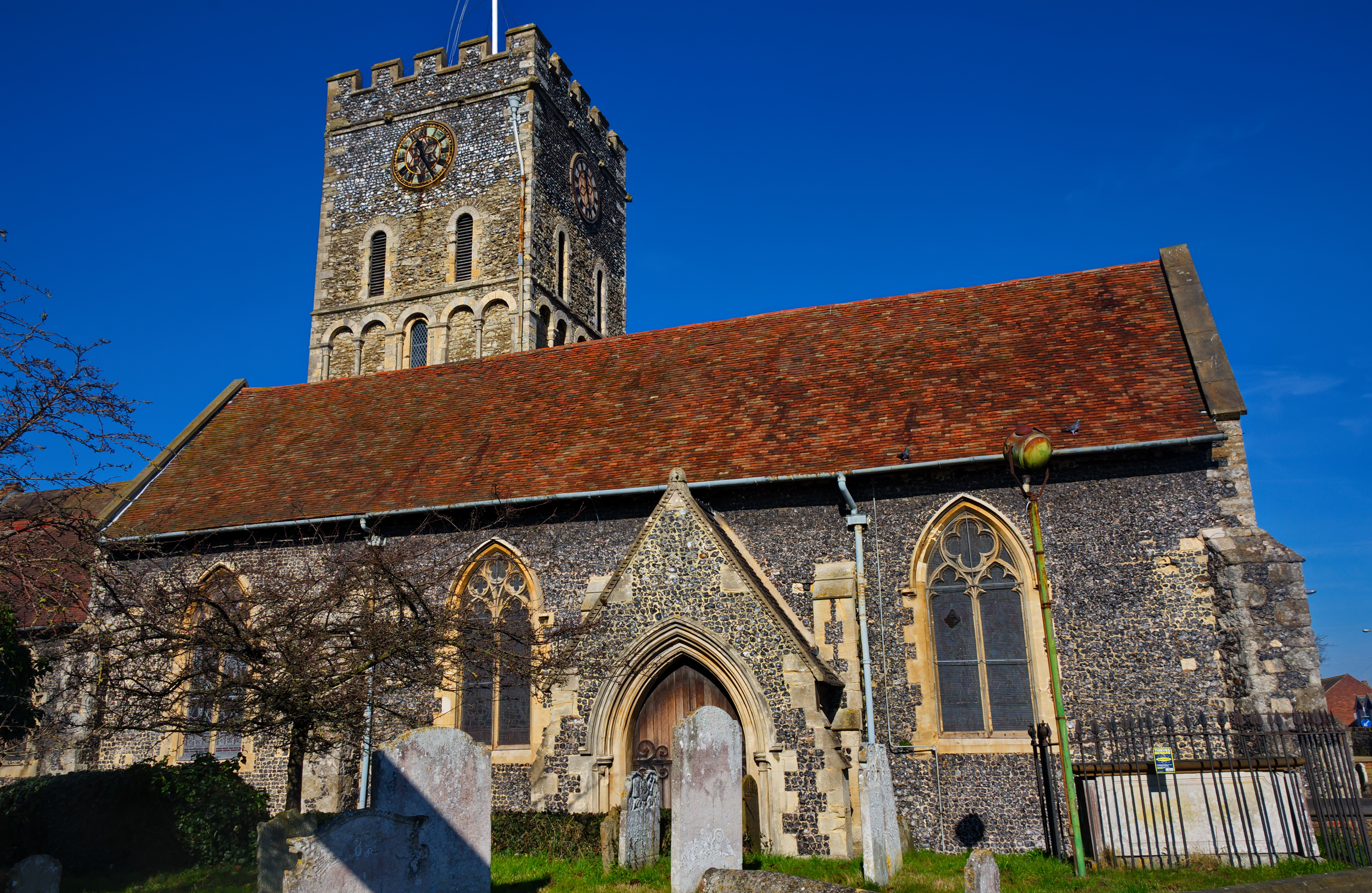
Church of St Laurence, Ramsgate, the oldest church in the town.

The town has three notable churches. St Augustine's is part of the Catholic Archdiocese of Southwark and England's shrine to St. Augustine of Canterbury, whilst St Laurence and St George are both Church of England, and serve the Anglican community as part of the Diocese of Canterbury. Other churches include Holy Trinity and St Ethelbert's RC.

=== St Laurence-in-Thanet ===
The first building used for worship in the Thanet parish of 'St Lawrence' was at St Laurence-in-Thanet, built in 1062 and rebuilt during the following centuries with the most significant changes being in the 16th century. Note the difference in spelling between that of the Village of St Lawrence and the church, which is dedicated to the Roman Martyr, Laurence.

A notable burial in the churchyard is Augusta Emma d'Este (1801–1866) wife of Thomas Wilde, Lord Chancellor and 1st Baron Truro. She is interred in the D'Este mausoleum.

=== St Augustine's ===
The second notable church is St Augustine's, Ramsgate, which is situated on the town's westcliff. The architect, A. W. N. Pugin, built the church at his own expense between 1845 and 1852 in the neo-Gothic style and wrote that 'not one of the true principles will be broken'; it is considered one of the most important of Pugin's buildings. Pugin and other members of his family are buried in the chantry chapel in the church. The church's dedication commemorates Augustine, the first Archbishop of Canterbury, who landed at Ramsgate in AD 597 bringing Christianity to Britain for the first time since the Roman Empire. Pugin donated the church to the Catholic Archdiocese of Southwark before his premature death in 1852. In March 2012, the church was designated a shrine of St. Augustine of Canterbury; this ended a five-century absence of a shrine to St. Augustine as the original (at St. Augustine's Abbey, Canterbury) was destroyed during the Reformation.

Thomas Grant, first Bishop of Southwark, invited the Italian abbot Dom Pietro Casaretto to found an abbey on the opposite side of the road from the church. By 1856 arrangements were concluded and the first monk, Dom Wilfrid Alcock, arrived to take charge at the Ramsgate mission. The monastery of St Augustine of Canterbury was built in 1860-1861, the first Benedictine monastery in England since the Reformation, designed by Pugin's son Edward. Peter Paul Pugin added the east wing to the monastery in 1901, and the library was built in 1926 designed by Charles Purcell, Pugin's grandson. St. Augustine's church was the abbey's church until 2010. On 23 December 2010, the monks voted to purchase the Franciscan Friary at Chilworth, Surrey, as their new home, leaving from St Augustine's. St Augustine's is now a centre of great historical and religious interest, open to the public, as the Shrine of St Augustine of Canterbury and the exemplar of Pugin's "true principles". Restoration of the site, along with the creation of an Education, Research, and Visitor Centre, is being supported by generous supporters including the Heritage Lottery Fund.

=== St George ===
Thirdly, the town's Parish Church of St George is situated just off the town's High Street. Its lantern tower was added at the request of Trinity House as a navigational aid to passing ships and looks over the town. The ground was consecrated on 23 October 1827. The comic actor John Le Mesurier is buried in the churchyard.

=== Holy Trinity ===
Holy Trinity is located on the East Cliff of the town. The foundation stone was laid on 29 August 1844. The architect was Mr Everard Henley and the builder was Mr W. E Smith. The church cost £3,000 to construct on land presented by Augusta Emma d'Este (later Lady Truro).

=== St Ethelbert's ===
Dedicated to Saint Ethelbert and Saint Gertrude. St Ethelbert's is Catholic church on Hereson Road. The church was designed by Peter Paul Pugin and constructed by W.W. Martin & Sons. The church was opened on 17 August 1902.

=== Synagogue ===
The 1833, Montefiore synagogue by David Mocatta was built in elegant Regency style as the private chapel of Sir Moses Montefiore.

== Library ==
Ramsgate library was originally built and paid for by Andrew Carnegie in 1904. On the evening of Friday 13 August 2004 a fire destroyed Ramsgate library just two months short of its 100th anniversary. Though suspicions were raised as to what started the fire due to a similarly timed fire at the towns registry office, an inquest concluded that the blaze was too intense to pinpoint where and how the fire started. The new library was built using the shell of the old building and was (re)opened in February 2009.

== Montefiore Tomb ==
Sir Moses Montefiore's Ramsgate tomb, is located to the side of the Montefiore Synagogue. It is a replica of Rachel's Tomb on the road from Jerusalem to Bethlehem. It contains the tombs of Sir Moses and Lady Montefiore who were buried side by side. During an 1841 visit to the Land of Israel, Montefiore obtained permission from the Ottoman Turks to restore the tomb.

== Ramsgate Jewish Cemetery ==
The Ramsgate Jewish Cemetery consists of an Ohel (prayer hall) and graves of approximately 400 people. The Ohel and surrounding flint wall were Grade II listed in 2008. The Hebrew inscription above the door reads: “The dead will the Lord make live”. The cemetery is maintained by the Montefiore Endowment. The cemetery is laid out in two main sections with a small children's section to the right-hand side of the Ohel. The cemetery was established at a meeting held at the Ramsgate home of Mr. Benjamin Norden, on 7 April 1872. He informed the meeting that he "purposed purchasing a piece of freehold ground, 100 ft. square, for the sum of £100, situated in the parish of St. Lawrence, and to present the same to the Jewish inhabitants of Ramsgate, to be used as a burial ground". The first person buried was Rosetta Twyman, who died on 28 October 1872.

Notable burials:

- Lazarus Hart - Mayor of Ramsgate
- Joseph Barnett – Mayor of Ramsgate
- Jacob Van den Bergh – Unilever
- Mabel Miriam Sainsbury – Supermarkets
- John Crowe Twyman – Photographer

== Townley House ==
Townley House stands at 48-54 Chatham Street, opposite Chatham House Grammar School (51°20′14.3″N 1°24′55.5″E). It was designed by Mrs Mary Townley in 1780. Whilst still a princess, Queen Victoria spent holidays in Ramsgate and stayed at Townley House, which is now part of Farleys Furniture Store. The property was due to be demolished in the 1960s until it was bought by Norman and Harold Farley to expand their business.

== The Hart Havens ==
Built 1923 in 16th century style.The Ramsgate Society: Historic Buildings Situated halfway along Thanet Road.

== St. Augustine's Grange ==
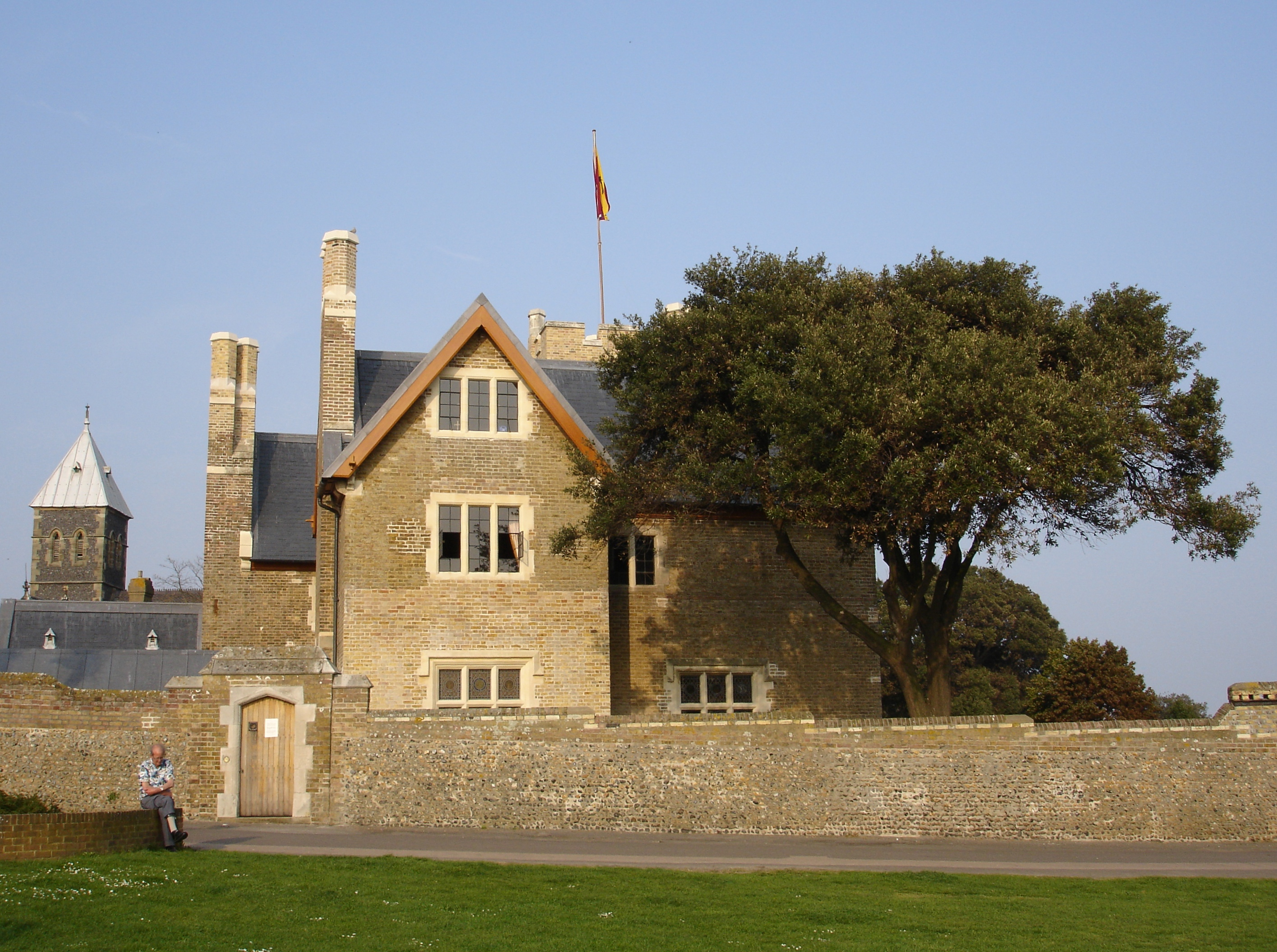
The Grange in Ramsgate was designed by Pugin

Home of architect Augustus Pugin, now a Grade I listed building. Pugin was a key figure in the Gothic revival movement, and The Grange, completed in 1850, exemplifies his ideas about domestic architecture. It marks the break from square-faced boxes of Regency style and was hugely influential in the development of British domestic architecture.

== Albion House ==
The land for Albion Place was purchased by Stephen Heritage from Robert Smith, a carpenter, in March 1789. Stephen Heritage laid out the land for the construction of Albion Place and its roads, with building plots for resale. The building plots were then sold on to a group of 20 people in March 1791. James Simmons was not among this list of purchasers so he must have bought the house or the land from one of these people in order to build the house.

The deeds stipulated that the houses were all to be built in a similar manner and were to be completed within two years. This means Albion House was built 1791/2. It appears that Albion House was purchased as an investment by James Simmons, alderman and entrepreneur of Canterbury, as there is no sign that he ever lived anywhere else other than Canterbury.

Albion House was sold by Simmons' executor to the Duke of Portland and following his death a couple of years later the house was put up for auction in 1810.

At this point Mary Townley purchased the property. Her husband, James, was one of the original purchasers of some of the plots in Albion Place. James Townley had gone on to purchase the green in front of Albion Place in 1803. This was sold in 1839 at the time of Mary Townley's death. Mary Townley, née Gostling, was one of England's earliest female architects. She came from a well-established family in Twickenham. The Archbishop of Canterbury occupied the house in the summer of 1810 arriving there in the August. At the end of June 1821 a Dr Andrews, doctor to the prominent banker, Mr Coutts, committed suicide whilst staying at Albion House when in Ramsgate to visit a friend. In March 1834 the property was let for three months to the Earl and Countess of Munster. The Earl was the eldest natural son of King William IV by his mistress. The Duchess of Kent with her daughter Princess Victoria, later Queen Victoria, stayed at Albion House for several months in 1835.

Mary Townley owned Albion House until her death in 1839. At this point the property was put up for sale at auction along with a number of other properties owned by the Townley family. The house continued to be let as a holiday home to members of the gentry. In 1838 the Duke of Newcastle stayed there for the season. He returned again in 1846.

The house was still being advertised to let in 1850 but after this time it appears that there was a change of use to a men's social club. There are plans of a billiard room originally dated March 1837 with accompanying description as to the works to be carried out but they do not appear to have been signed off until 1851. There is no mention of it in the sales particular of 1839 so it seems the plans were drawn up but not acted on until after its sale. It is described as Albion Club House, Albion Place.

Mary Townley's death coincided with Ramsgate becoming a less fashionable resort to stay in for the aristocracy and gentry. "The smarter resorts on the south coast began to lose their aristocratic tone in the 1840s and 1850s, when they were discovered by middle-class Londoners. Towards the end of the century Charles Booth found a growing number of Londoners, especially clerks, policemen, shopworkers and local government employees, who had a week's or even a fortnight's paid holiday, and were thus able to join in London's colonization of the Kent coast". The house may then have struggled to have been let as a family residence and for this reason became used as a gentleman's club before becoming a lodging house. Albion House was certainly a lodging house by at least 1857 when George Potter, a substantial farmer, was at the property. He is recorded at the property in the 1861 census as a Lodging House Keeper. By the mid-nineteenth century it was being used by the middle classes for holidays with people like the Church family, headed by Edmund Boyle Church, a solicitor visiting. In 1881 the Boarding House Proprietor was Charles Wilkinson. Ten years later the house no longer seemed to be in use as a boarding house and was put up for sale in August 1892. The house was finally sold in 1900 by Montague Kingsford, a solicitor, to Ramsgate Council who used it as its offices until 1974 when it transferred to the ownership of Thanet Council. November 2014 reopened as a boutique hotel. In July 2016 the ground floor restaurant and bar of the hotel were named Townley's, after Mary Townley.

== Mount Albion House ==
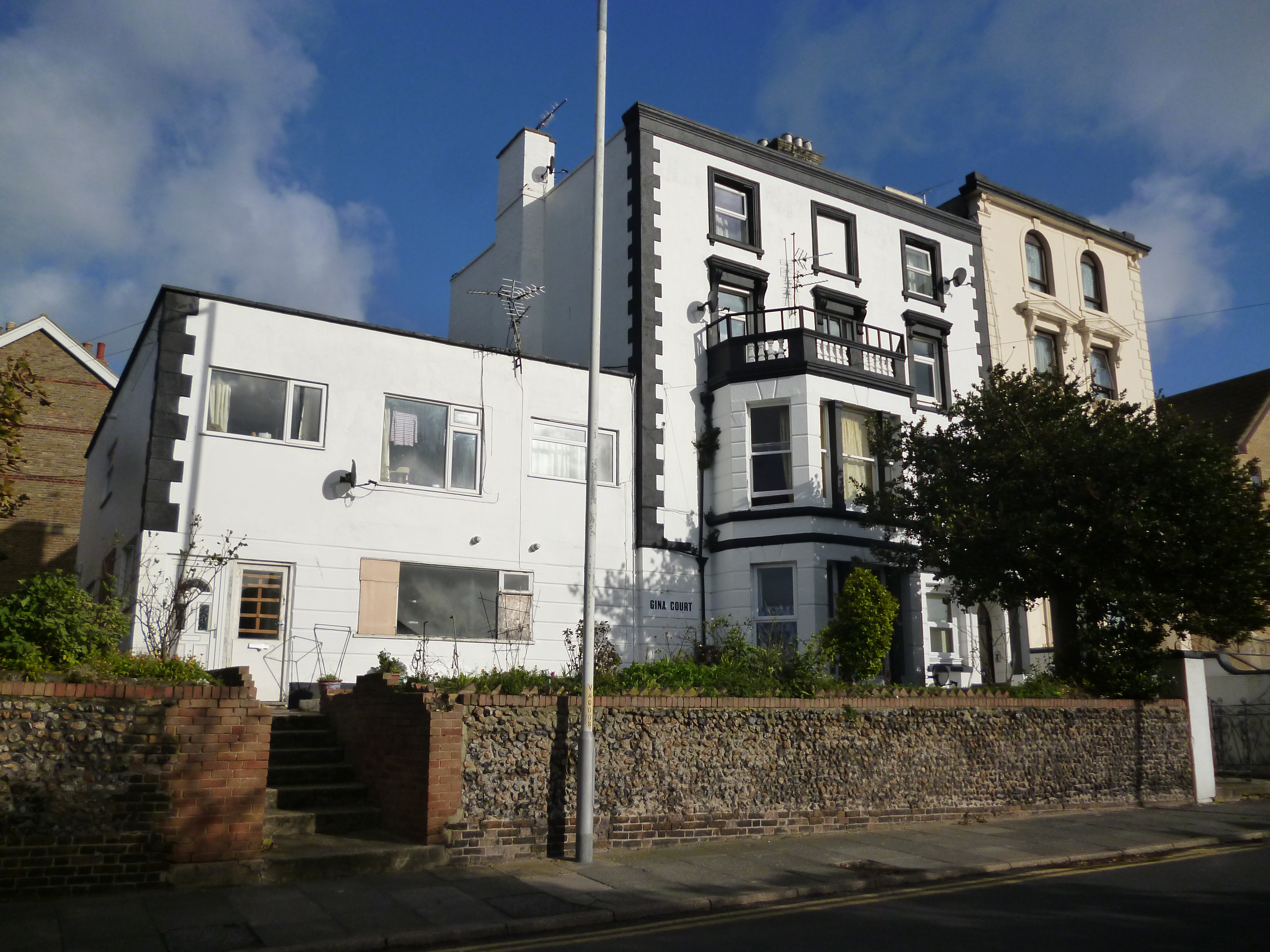
Mount Albion House - 22 Victoria Road, Ramsgate.

Mount Albion House was built in 1798 by a local miller named John Marshall. It was the home of Augusta Emma d'Este. Dr. John Collis Browne, the originator of the medicine Chlorodyne, died here on 30 August 1884 and is commemorated by a plaque.

== The Granville Hotel ==
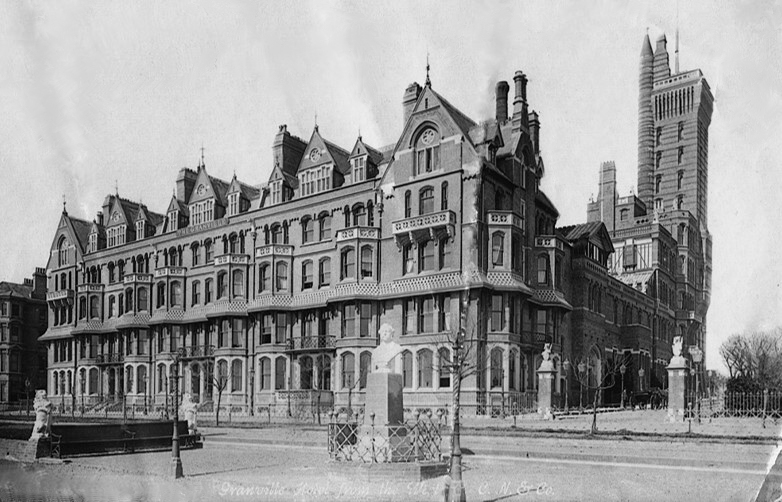
The Granville Hotel as it originally appeared before alterations in 1900 by Spiers & Pond Ltd.

Built by Edward Welby Pugin in 1869, originally as a terrace of eight large houses and later converted into a hotel. The building is now private apartments.

== Royal Victoria Pavilion ==
The Royal Victoria Pavilion, on Ramsgate seafront, opened in 1904. Originally a theatre, it later became a casino and afterwards was derelict for some years. It has been converted to a pub by Wetherspoons and opened in 2017. It is that company's largest outlet.

== West Cliff Lodge ==
West Cliff Lodge was originally built by a Mr. Benson and named Royal Villa. He was Helen Lumsden's uncle, and she became engaged to Augustus Pugin after the death of his second wife. Her family told her to break it off, Pugin was most upset and visited Mr. Benson for comfort.

== Railway station ==
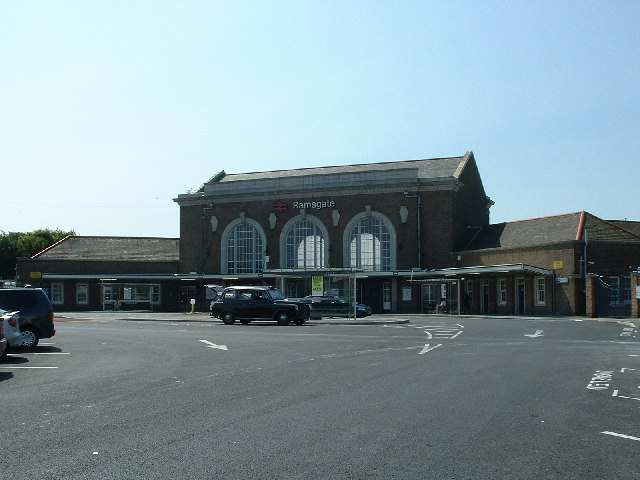
Ramsgate railway station

Ramsgate railway station is "possibly the finest New Classical railway station in southern England". It is a Grade II listed building built between 1924 and 1926 by Edwin Fry.
