= St Augustine's Church, Ramsgate =

Coordinates: 51.328397°N 1.410269°E

St Augustine's Church
- Shrine of St Augustine of Canterbury; Pugin's church of St Augustine
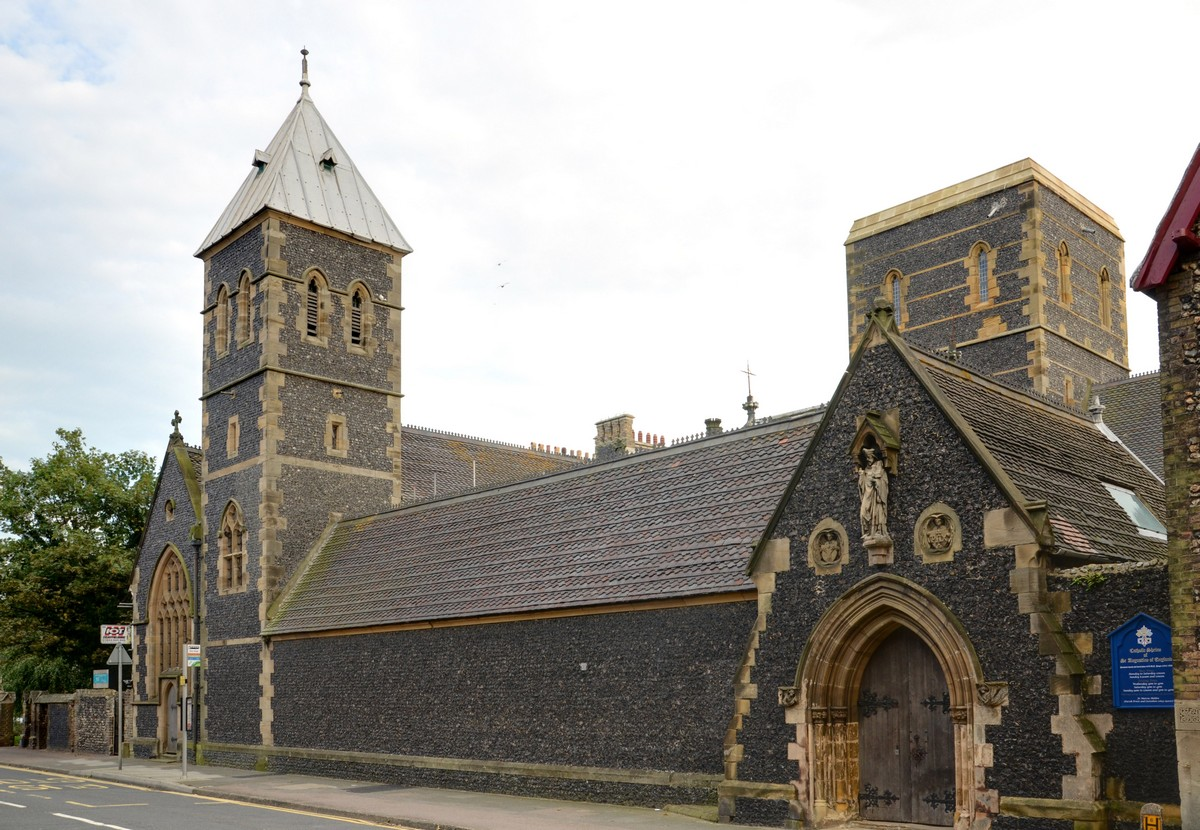
- Church with cloister attached

- Location in Kent
- OS grid reference: TR 37668 64329
- Location: Ramsgate, Kent
- Country: England
- Denomination: Roman Catholic
- Website: http://www.augustine-pugin.org.uk

History
- Status: Shrine Church; Education, Research, and Visitor Centre
- Founded: 1846
- Founder: Augustus Pugin
- Dedication: St Augustine of Canterbury and Our Lady of Sorrows
- Consecrated: 1884

Architecture
- Functional status: Active
- Heritage designation: Grade I listed
- Designated: 4 February 1988
- Architect: Augustus Pugin
- Style: Gothic
- Years built: 1846–52

Administration
- Archdiocese: Southwark
- Deanery: Thanet
- Parish: Ramsgate and Minster

Clergy
- Archbishop: Archbishop John Wilson
- Rector: Fr Jonathon Routh

St Augustine's Church or the Shrine of St Augustine of Canterbury is a Roman Catholic church in Ramsgate, Kent. It was the personal church of Augustus Pugin, a nineteenth-century architect, designer, and reformer. The church is an example of Pugin's design ideas, and it forms a central part of Pugin's collection of buildings in Ramsgate. Having built his home (The Grange, Ramsgate, next door), Pugin began work on St Augustine's in 1846 and worked on it until his death in 1852. His sons completed many of the designs. This is the site where Pugin is buried, in a vault beneath the chantry chapel he designed, alongside several members of his family.

== History ==
St Augustine brought Christianity to the English for the first time in AD 597, landing very close to the site of St Augustine's. After his death (c.604), his tomb soon became a shrine. This shrine, which was enlarged and moved over the centuries, was destroyed under the orders of King Henry VIII and Thomas Cromwell in 1538, and St Augustine's remains in Canterbury were destroyed. Some relics of the saint had been sent to Europe as gifts in previous centuries.

St Augustine's was built by the architect and designer Augustus Welby Northmore Pugin – most famous for his designs of the Houses of Parliament in Westminster – between 1845 and his death in 1852. This is the only church he built funded by himself. According to the Pugin Society, it is the pinnacle and most personal of Pugin's designs, "full of the character of its designer."

Pugin bought the site in 1843 and immediately planned to build a church, to be constructed after he had built his home there. First he built his home (The Grange) into which he moved with his family in late October 1844 when he was 32 years old. The next year he began construction of St Augustine's, and gave it to the Vicar Apostolic of the London District on 19 November 1846. Pugin's attraction to Ramsgate was grounded in his Aunt Selina, his love of the sea (he particularly liked sailing) and his devotion to St Augustine of Canterbury. He had visited his aunt several times at Rose Hill Cottage, he spent some time in Ramsgate renting a house in Plains of Waterloo, and he lived with his second wife, Louisa, in a cottage close to St Laurence Church. He also had a particular interest in his patron saint, St Augustine of Canterbury, who had landed at Ebbsfleet on the Isle of Thanet, just a mile or so from where he bought land in Ramsgate. As he wrote in a letter, this is "where blessed Austin landed."

Although St Augustine's is now considered to be close to the centre of Ramsgate, in the mid-nineteenth century Pugin's land was on the western edge of the town. His painting A True Prospect shows countryside surrounding the site: in fact, these areas had already been laid out in building plots which were being sold, but St Augustine's was initially on the edge of the town.

The first part completed was the schoolroom in 1846. This building served as the first church, and so was the first public Catholic building in Ramsgate since the Reformation (Pugin's house, completed 1844 contained a chapel which was used for Mass). In this building, Pugin also ran a free school for local children. This enterprise closed soon after Pugin discovered that the children were stealing his coal, though it later became part of St Augustine's College run by the monks.

On 19 November 1846 Pugin gave the whole project legally to the Vicar Apostolic of the London District. Although Pugin continued to build the church as he designed and paid for it, he was anxious that the property should be held by the Church as soon as possible. This ownership has been vested in the Archdiocese of Southwark since the restoration of the hierarchy in 1850.

Next completed was the rest of the east range (including upstairs rooms and the sacristy) in 1846. The church building followed slowly until it was roofed in on 28 July 1849. This included the chantry chapel that Pugin designed to be over the burial place for himself and his family.

Pugin designed St Augustine's to be aligned east–west, which is the traditional alignment of churches, symbolising the priest and people facing the sunrise (which itself is a symbol of Christ's coming as the light of the world) during Mass. To make the church as long as possible on a comparatively narrow plot, Pugin had to build right up to the plot's eastern boundary. To avoid having a building directly next to his great east window, he engaged the owner of the plot immediately east of the church with the hope of buying a strip of that plot. The owner, Matthew Habershon, had a dislike of Pugin and made him pay a large amount of money for the land, £450 (the plot for St Augustine's and The Grange had been £700). Habershon then built Chartham Terrace on his own plot – a tall building that deliberately attempted to cut out light from Pugin's window. Chartham Terrace, despite its similarity to St Augustine's with its knapped flint exterior, is not a Pugin building. This whole collection of buildings models Pugin's ideas of what constitutes a good society, based on an understanding of the Middle Ages with the local community served in education, healthcare, spiritual care, and employment by a monastery and benefactors, all based around a church.

Pugin died on 14 September 1852 in The Grange. A few hours before he had entered St Augustine's and remarked how beautiful it is. At his death, the church and eastern range were largely complete. However, his sons completed the north and west cloisters along with their chapels. The Digby Chantry Chapel (the Chapel of St John the Evangelist) was built in 1859, and St Joseph's Chapel was built in 1893 by Viscountess Southwell to mark the coming of age of her son, who had been educated at the monks' school in Ramsgate (St Augustine's College). The central tower of the church, with its spire, was never completed.

In 1856, monks were invited by Bishop Thomas Grant of the Archdiocese of Southwark to make a foundation in Ramsgate. Dom Wilfrid Alcock, an Englishman who had become a monk in Italy, was sent by the Subiaco Congregation of the Benedictine Order to found the monastery in Ramsgate. Initially the community lived in St Edward's (the presbytery next door, built by Pugin), and later moved into the purpose-built monastery across the road, built by Edward Pugin. The church was used as the abbey church from 1856 until the monks moved their community to Chilworth, Surrey, in 2011.

On 1 March 2012, the 200th anniversary of Pugin's birth, Archbishop Peter Smith created St Augustine's as the shrine of St Augustine of England. Thus 474 years after the destruction of St Augustine's shrine in Canterbury on the orders of Henry VIII and Thomas Cromwell, the shrine was restored. The priests of the Oxford Oratory donated a relic believed to be part of a bone from St Augustine.

== Parts of the site ==
=== Schoolroom ===
Built by Pugin, this is the earliest part of the site and was used as the church until the church proper was completed. Here Pugin ran a free school for Ramsgate's poor children, and later St Augustine's College used this space. With funding from the Heritage Lottery Fund and other donors, the schoolroom became an Education and Visitor Centre in 2017.

=== Library ===
This room was once called the Abbot's Chapel and was the private chapel of the abbot when there was a monastery here. It is believed that it was also the first dormitory of St Augustine's College. This became part of the Research Centre in 2017.

=== Tower ===
At the junction of the north and east cloister, this was built by Augustus Pugin and contains the Sacred Heart altar designed by his son, Peter Paul Pugin. It is suspected, through examination of his True Prospect painting, that Pugin intended this to be the site of an Easter Sepulchre (a now-unusual type of altar, but common in the Sarum Rite that Pugin so liked, used in the liturgies of Holy Week). The tower contains a bell.

=== Cloisters ===
The word cloister comes from the Latin claustrum, meaning 'enclosed'. Cloisters are common features of monastic houses and are where the monks could pray and work. Often they are open on one side, but Pugin's at St Augustine's are enclosed with walls and windows. They surround a small garden called a garth.

==== East cloister ====
This was built by Augustus Pugin and is next to the schoolroom, below the library. It will become part of the Education, Research, and Visitor Centre in 2017.

==== North cloister ====
This cloister, which had its floor and north wall to a height of 76 cm when Pugin died, was completed in 1860 by Pugin's son Edward Pugin after his father's death, and mostly financed by Kenelm Henry Digby. It contains the Chapel of St Joseph and the Chapel of St John the Evangelist (Digby Chantry Chapel). Along its north wall is a set of painted terracotta Stations of the Cross, made by Alois de Beule in 1893. There is a memorial brass to the first abbot of Ramsgate, Wilfrid Alcock, who died and is buried in New Zealand. Small brass plaques commemorate all the monks who have died here.

==== West cloister ====
This was also built by Edward Pugin and leads from the road to the main church entrance. The entrances to the Garth and the Digby Chantry Chapel are in this cloister. There is a brass on the tomb of Alfred Luck, who was a friend of Pugin and eventually became a monk and a priest.

=== St Joseph's Chapel ===
This was donated by Viscountess Southwell in 1893 to mark the coming of age of her son, who had been educated here at the monks' school.

=== Digby Chantry Chapel (Chapel of St John the Evangelist) ===
This was built as the burial place of the celebrated Victorian writer, Catholic convert, and friend of Pugin, Kenelm Henry Digby. Although several members of his family are buried here, Digby is buried elsewhere. The chapel cost £2,500 in 1859. Digby brought the skull of an early Christian martyr, St Benignus, to this chapel and it was installed here on 25 June 1859. It was later moved to be stored in the monastery and badly conserved, but received treatment and proper conservation before being replaced in this chapel on 9 March 2015 by Cardinal Burke.

=== The nave ===
This is the main body of the church. The word nave comes from the Latin navis because the Church is metaphorically a ship sailing people towards Christ. Here can be found treasures such as the baptismal font, stained glass windows, intricate stonework, and more.

=== Pugin Chantry Chapel (Chapel of St Stephen and St Lawrence) ===
This is the chapel above the vault in which Pugin and several members of his family are buried. The effigy of Pugin, designed by his son, Edward, is against the south wall. Above it is the "Augustine Window" which was installed in 1861 as a memorial to Pugin. This window depicts the story of St Augustine, from his commissioning by the pope in Rome to his landing on Thanet and establishment of his monastery and cathedral in Canterbury; at the bottom are depicted Pugin and his three wives with their corresponding patron saints. Pugin is depicted presenting this church. Above, in the tracery lights, put in by Pugin in 1849, are King Saint Louis of France and angels bearing censers.

This chapel also contains the altar that Pugin had in his own chapel in his house. It was moved into this chapel in the 1930s. The painted reredos was donated by Sir John Sutton, Bt. Above it is a window depicting this chapel's patron saints: St Lawrence (famously grilled to death in Rome for being a Christian), and St Stephen (a deacon and the first Christian martyr, stoned to death with the approval of the man who would become St Paul).

The chapel also contains two reliquaries which contain a relic of St Laurence (second Archbishop of Canterbury) and Pope Gregory the Great (who sent St Augustine on his mission).

=== Lady Chapel ===
This chapel contains stained glass which Pugin exhibited in the Great Exhibition in 1851. The Lady Altar is also a significant piece of stonework. In this chapel, on the altar, the Blessed Sacrament is currently reserved.

Here, too, are the parclose screens which once divided the chancel from the Lady Chapel, and the rood screen which once divided the chancel from the nave. These are examples of woodwork and will return to their original positions during 2016. Screens, and especially rood screens, are very important to Pugin's designs and were integral to this ideals of church interiors.

=== Chancel ===
Situated at the east end, this is where the high altar is and where the Mass is celebrated. This is also where the choir stalls are. Above the chancel, on the north side, is the organ in what was originally a gallery. There is also a ‘squint' next to the organ.

=== Shrine of St Augustine ===
The relic of St Augustine is kept in a shrine on the north side of the church, just to the west of the chancel.

== Significance of the site ==
The writer and journalist Clive Aslet has called for the site to be made a World Heritage Site.

This site is part of a grander scheme: Pugin's house, the presbytery, and the monastery across the road. This was part of Pugin's social reformist vision, as well as his architectural and design vision. He was able here to do as he wished because he was his own paymaster, and so it is an example of Pugin's principles and values. The woodwork, metalwork, stonework, encaustic tiles, stained glass, and more, are all important in this site.

== Shrine of St Augustine of England ==
The original shrine had been established c. AD 604 when St Augustine died. He was buried in a small chapel on the north side of his monastery church outside the city walls in Canterbury. His shrine became popular, and in 968 Archbishop Dunstan rededicated the whole monastery to St Augustine (it had previously been dedicated only to SS Peter and Paul, the dedication originally given by St Augustine).

In 1091 St Augustine's body was moved ('translated') to a bigger purpose-built shrine at the eastern end of St Augustine's Abbey. The records say how elaborate his original shrine had become, and later records and plans show how elaborate his later shrine became. It was extensively remodelled several times in the following four and a half centuries. Kings, queens, nobles, clergy, monks, nuns, and countless ordinary people came to pay homage to St Augustine, who was called "Apostle of the English."

In 1538, St Augustine's Abbey was dissolved as part of the English Reformation. This ended almost one thousand years of monastic life on the site and devotion to St Augustine. Some relics had been taken from the body at various times, and, although most of the body was destroyed (along with most of the shrine) at the dissolution of the abbey, some relics survived elsewhere.

In 2012 the Fathers of the Oxford Oratory gave a small piece of bone, which is one of the surviving pieces of St Augustine's body, to St Augustine's. On 1 March 2012, Archbishop Peter Smith of Southwark formally created St Augustine's as the shrine of St Augustine of England. This was 474 years after the destruction of the original shrine.

== Festivals and holy days ==
Saints days of particular importance at St Augustine's:

- 25 February – St Ethelbert
- 12 March – St Gregory the Great (traditional feast)
- 26 May – St Augustine of Canterbury (traditional feast in England)
- 27 May – St Augustine of Canterbury
- 13 July – St Mildred
- 3 September – St Gregory the Great
- 15 September – Our Lady of Sorrows

Other significant days at St Augustine's:

- 1 March – Pugin's birthday (1812)
- 14 September – Pugin's day of death (1852)

Each year St Augustine's hosts two festival weeks: St Augustine Week and Pugin Week to celebrate these two central figures. St Augustine Week is in late May, around St Augustine's Day on 26/27 May. Pugin Week is held around the day of Pugin's death on 14 September.

== Education, Research, and Visitor Centre ==
In 2017 a new Education, Research, and Visitor Centre opened in the buildings on the site. It educates people about St Augustine and Augustus Pugin and their legacies.

Funding was secured through many donations from private individuals and charitable trusts. The Heritage Lottery Fund gave most of the funding, and is supporting the development of the project.

== Grounds and interior ==
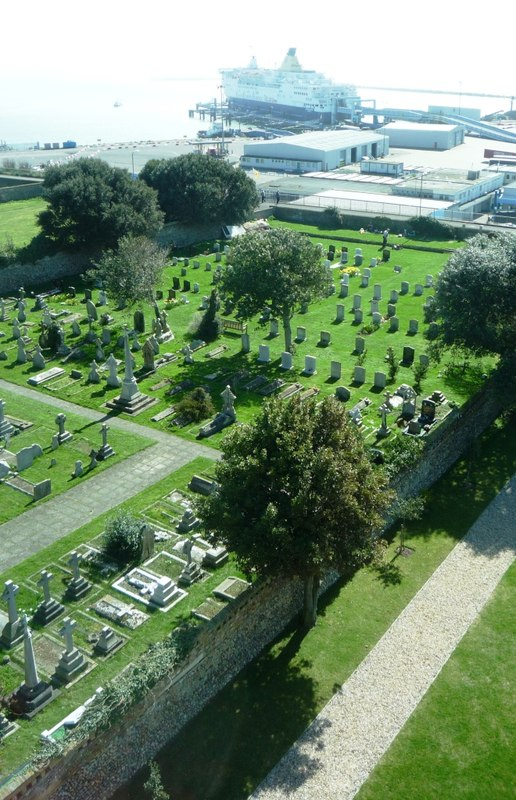
Abbey cemetery from The Grange, Ramsgate

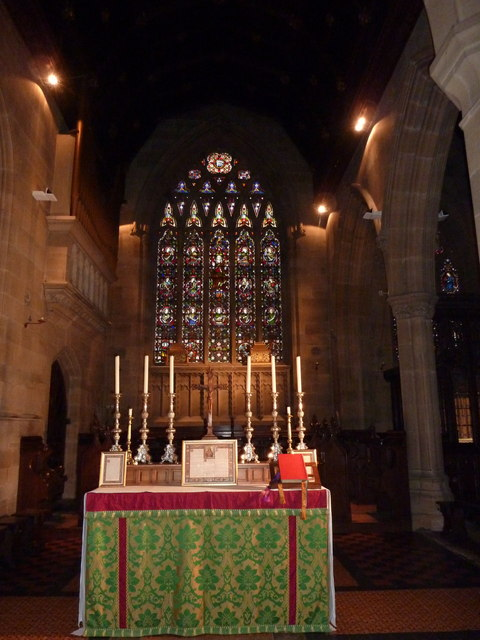
Chancel as rearranged in 1970

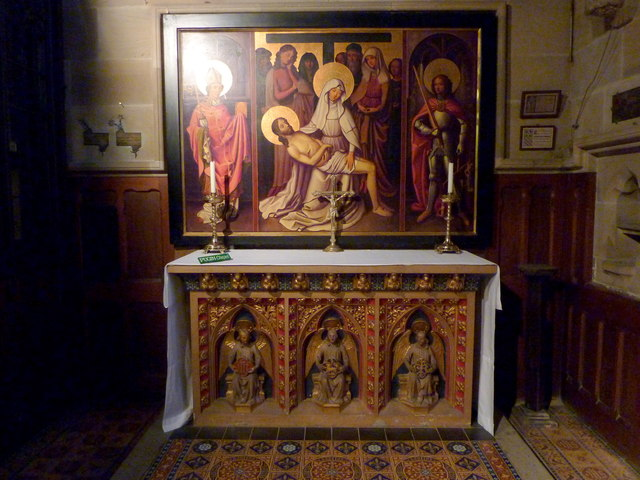
Pugin Chantry Chapel altar

== See also ==
- St Augustine's Abbey, Ramsgate
