= Hodgson =

Hodgson is a surname. In Britain, the Hodgson surname was the 173rd most common (766 per million) in 1881 and the 206th most common (650 per million) in 1998. In the United States of America, Hodgson was the 3753rd most popular surname (30 per million) in the 1990 census.

== Origin and meaning ==
Hodgson is a patronymic surname, thought by some to mean "son of Hodge", with Hodge being a Middle English personal name usually representing a pet-form of the name Roger. However, Geoffrey Hodgson shows that both distribution of the name and DNA suggest a Norse-Irish origin, making “son of Oddgeir” a more likely derivation.

== Variants ==
The Hodson surname is less common and generally derives from Hodgson. Other probable variants of Hodgson include Hodgeson, Hodgshon, Hodshon, Hodgin, Hodgins, Hodgen, Hodgens, Hodghson, Hodgon and Hodgeon. In the North of England the "s" is often silent in the pronunciation of Hodgson. This accounts for variants such as Hodgin, Hodgen, Hodgon and Hodgeon.

== Coat of arms ==
The Hodgsons of Hebburn, a mine-owning Catholic family living in the North East of England in the sixteenth and seventeenth centuries (Surtees 1820, vol. 2, pp. 77, 319, James 1974, Hodgson 2008), bore a heraldic coat of arms, blazoned as "per chevron, embattled or and azure, three martlets counterchanged". This same coat of arms is associated with several other Hodgson families, including the Hodgsons of West Keal in Lincolnshire, the Hodgsons of Bascodyke in Cumberland (Hodgson 1925), the Hodshons of Amsterdam, and with Thomas Hodgson (1738–1817) a Liverpool merchant and slave trader, and the owner of a mill in Caton, Lancashire (Hodgson 2008).

== Border Reivers and Hodgson clans ==
For centuries before James VI's assentation to the throne of England (Union of the Crowns), the remote Anglo-Scottish borderland region had been the lair of unruly clans and gangs of robbers that were largely beyond the reach of the law. A peculiar form of clan organisation grew up in this area. This was the land of the Border Reivers. These clans had a legal system distinct from that of the majority of England and Scotland (Robb 2018). The suppression of this legal system led to a generalised breakdown of Reiver society (Robb 2018). They would steal goods, cattle and women from across the nominal border.

Some Hodgsons in Cumberland were themselves a clan organisation (Fraser 1971). The border clans were eventually subjected by state authorities. Many were forced or obliged to emigrate to North America in the 18th century (Fischer 1989). Many Hodgsons emigrated in this period.

== People with the surname ==
- Alex Hodgson, Scottish singer/songwriter
- Andrew Hodgson (disambiguation)
- Arthur Hodgson (1818–1902), Australian pioneer and politician
- Brett Hodgson, Australian professional rugby league player
- Brian Hodgson, British television composer and sound technician
- Brian Houghton Hodgson (1800–1894), British naturalist
- Bryan Hodgson, American college basketball coach
- Caroline Hodgson (1851–1908), Australian brothel proprietor
- Charles Hodgson (artist) (c. 1770 – 1856), amateur English landscape painter
- Christopher Hodgson (disambiguation)
- Claire Merritt Hodgson (1897–1976), second wife of Babe Ruth
- Cody Hodgson (born 1990), Canadian professional ice hockey player
- David Hodgson (disambiguation)
- Derek Hodgson (disambiguation)
- Edward Hodgson (disambiguation)
- Frances Hodgson Burnett, born Frances Eliza Hodgson (1849–1924), English–American playwright and author
- Francis Roger Hodgson (1853–1920), British clergyman and Bible translator
- Frederick Hodgson (disambiguation)
- Gaynor Hodgson, British child actress
- Geoffrey Hodgson (born 1946), economist
- George Hodgson (disambiguation)
- Henrietta Mildred Hodgson (1805–1891), great-great-grandmother of Queen Elizabeth II
- Henry Hodgson (disambiguation)
- Herbert John Hodgson (1893–1974), soldier and printer of The Seven Pillars of Wisdom
- Isaac Hodgson (architect) (1826–1909), Irish-US architect
- James Hodgson (disambiguation)
- Jane Elizabeth Hodgson (1915–2006), American obstetrician and gynecologist
- Joel Hodgson (born 1960), creator and former host of Mystery Science Theater 3000
- John Hodgson (disambiguation)
- Joseph Hodgson (1788–1869), British physician
- Julian Hodgson (born 1963), English chess grandmaster
- Ken Hodgson (1942–2007), English footballer from Newcastle.
- Laurence C. Hodgson (1874–1937), US newspaper writer and politician
- Leonard Hodgson (1889–1969), Anglican priest, philosopher, theologian, and historian
- Leyland Hodgson 1892–1949), American actor
- Lucy Hodgson, American sculptor and printmaker
- Mark Hodgson (1880–1967), British trade union leader
- Mark A. Hodgson (1793–1868), American politician from Pennsylvania
- Marshall Hodgson (1922–1968), American Islamic scholar
- Martin Hodgson (1909–1991), English rugby league forward and goalkicker
- Matthew Hodgson (disambiguation)
- Miriam Hodgson (1938–2005), British editor of children's books
- Natasha Hodgson (born 1986), English actress and writer
- Nick Hodgson (born 1977), English drummer and musician
- Patricia Hodgson, Principal of Newnham College, Cambridge
- Paul Hodgson (disambiguation)
- Peter Hodgson (disambiguation)
- Ralph Hodgson (1871–1962), English poet
- Randolph Hodgson (1870–1952), English clergyman and writer under the pen-name "A Country Vicar"
- Richard Hodgson (disambiguation)
- Robert Hodgson (disambiguation)
- Robert Willard Hodgson (1893–1966), American botanist
- Robert MacLeod Hodgson (1874–1956), British diplomat
- Robin Hodgson, Baron Hodgson of Astley Abbotts (born 1942), British politician
- Roger Hodgson (born 1950), English singer/songwriter
- Shadworth Hodgson (1832–1912), English philosopher
- Sharon Hodgson (born 1966), British politician
- Sharyn Hodgson (born 1968), Australian actress who appeared in Home and Away
- Stuart Milton Hodgson (1924–2015), Canadian commissioner
- Studholme Hodgson (1708–1798), British field marshal
- Sydney Hodgson (died 1591), English Roman Catholic lawyer and martyr
- Telfair Hodgson (1840–1893), American Episcopal priest and academic administrator
- Telfair Hodgson Jr. (1876–1952), American academic administrator, banker, developer
- Thomas Hodgson (disambiguation)
- W. N. Hodgson (1893–1916), First World War poet who published under the pen name Edward Melbourne
- Wil Hodgson (born 1978), English stand-up comedian
- William Hodgson (disambiguation)

== Sports people ==
- Arthur Hodgson (footballer) (1926–2003), Australian rules footballer
- Aub Hodgson (1912–1982), Australian rugby union player
- Billy Hodgson (1935–2022), Scottish footballer
- Brett Hodgson (born 1978), Australian rugby league player
- Charlie Hodgson (born 1980), rugby union player
- Cody Hodgson (born 1990), Canadian ice hockey player
- Dan Hodgson (born 1965), Canadian ice hockey player
- Dan Hodgson (cricketer) (born 1990), English cricketer
- Geoffrey Hodgson (cricketer) (born 1938), English cricketer
- Gordon Hodgson (1904–1951), South African-born English footballer, cricketer and baseball player
- Gordon Hodgson (footballer) (1952–1999), English footballer
- Isaac Hodgson (1828–1867), English cricketer
- Joe Hodgson (born 1988), 2012 British supermoto quad champion
- Martin Hodgson, English rugby league footballer
- Michael Hodgson (born 1979), Australian rugby league player
- Neil Hodgson, English motorcycle racer
- Nick Hodgson (swimmer) (born 1964), British swimmer
- Pat Hodgson (born 1944), US American football player
- Philip Hodgson (1935–2015), English cricketer
- Rick Hodgson (born 1956), Canadian ice hockey player
- Robert Hodgson (cricketer) (born 1973), Australian cricketer
- Roy Hodgson (born 1947), English football manager
- Rusty Hodgson (born 1981), British motorcycle racer
- Ted Hodgson (born 1945), Canadian ice hockey player
- Tim Hodgson (cricketer) (born 1975), English cricketer

== Fictional characters ==
- Tom Hodgson, a character from Channel Zero, portrayed by Brandon Scott

== First Names ==
Hodgson can also be a given name:

- Hodgson Pratt (1824–1907), English pacifist

== Place Names ==
- Hodgson Middle School (TDSB) (Toronto, Ontario)
- Hodgson, Manitoba (City)
- Hodgson, Texas (City)
- Hodgson, Texas (Ghost Town)
- Hodgson, Florida (City)
- Hodgson, Queensland (City)
- Hodgson, Hawke's bay, New Zealand

== Bibliography ==
- Fischer, David Hackett (1989) Albion's Seed: Four British Folkways in America (Oxford and New York: Oxford University Press).
- Fraser, George MacDonald (1971) The Steel Bonnets: The Story of the Anglo-Scottish Reivers (London: Barrie and Jenkins).

Antiquarian and Archaeological Society, New Series, 25, pp. 244–49.

- Hanks, Patrick, Richard Coates and Peter McClure, eds. (2016) The Oxford Dictionary of Family Names in Britain and Ireland, volume 2 (Oxford: Oxford University Press)
- Reaney, P. H. (1958) A Dictionary of English Surnames, first edition (London: Routledge and Kegan Paul).
- Robb, G. (2018). The Debatable Land: The Lost World Between Scotland and England (London: Picador)
- Surtees, Robert (1820) History and Antiquities of the County Palatine of Durham, volume 2 (London: Nichols).
