= Hodson =

Hodson is an English surname. It is derived from Middle English hode and is a patronymic. Notable people with the surname include:

- Alexander Carlton Hodson (1906–1996), American entomologist
- Arnold Hodson (1881–1944), British colonial administrator
- Ashley Hodson (born 1995), English footballer
- Bert Hodson, Welsh professional golfer
- Bill Hodson, Australian politician
- Bridget Hodson, British actress
- Christina Hodson, British screenwriter
- Christopher Hodson, British TV director
- Christopher Hodson, New Zealand barrister and judge
- Christopher Hodson, 17th century bell-founder
- Edward Hodson, English cricketer
- Frodsham Hodson, principal of Brasenose College, Oxford
- Geoffrey Hodson (1886–1983), occultist, Theosophist, mystic, Liberal Catholic priest, philosopher and esotericist
- George Hodson (baseball), American baseball player
- George Hodson, Anglican priest
- George Stacey Hodson, British World War I flying ace
- Gordon Hodson, Canadian psychologist
- Hannah Hodson, American actress
- Harry Hodson, British journalist and economist
- James Lansdale Hodson (1891–1956), British novelist, scriptwriter and journalist
- Jolie Hodson, New Zealand businesswoman
- Joseph York Hodsdon (1836–1901), Maine state senator
- Kevin Hodson, Canadian ice hockey player
- Lee Hodson, Northern Irish footballer
- Mark Hodson, Anglican bishop
- Phineas Hodson, British cleric
- Steve Hodson, British actor
- Thomas Hodson, British missionary
- Thomas Callan Hodson, British academic
- Tom Hodson (1990), rugby league, and rugby union footballer of the 2010s
- Tommy Hodson, American football quarterback of the 1990s
- William Stephen Raikes Hodson, British soldier

== See also ==
- Hudson (disambiguation)
- Hodgson
