= John Hodgson =

John Hodgson may refer to:

- John Hodgson (actor) (fl. 1690s), English stage actor
- John Hodgson (British Army officer) (1757–1846), British general
- John Hodgson (antiquary) (1779–1845), English clergyman and antiquary
- John Hodgson (Australian politician) (1799–1860), Australian politician and mayor of Melbourne
- John Hodgson (Pennsylvania politician) (died 1881), American politician and newspaperman from Pennsylvania
- John Hodgson (Wisconsin politician) (1812–1869), English-born Wisconsin politician
- John Barnet Hodgson (1819–1908), businessman and mayor of Ramsgate, England
- John Evan Hodgson (1831–1895), English painter
- J. F. Hodgson (John Frederick Hodgson, 1867–1947), British socialist activist
- John Hodgson (footballer, born 1900) (1900–1959), English football for Brentford
- John Hodgson (footballer, born 1922) (1922–1973), English footballer for Leeds United and Middlesbrough
- John H. Hodgson (fl. 1960s), Canadian historian
- John Hodgson (Kentucky politician) (fl. 2022), American politician
- John Hodgson (rugby union) (1909–1970), English rugby union player

== See also ==
- Herbert John Hodgson (1893–1974), English printer
- Jack Hodgson (disambiguation)
