= Hodgson (disambiguation) =

Hodgson may refer to:

People

- Hodgson, a surname
  - List of people named Hodgson

Places

- Hodgson, Edmonton, a neighbourhood in southwest Edmonton, Alberta, Canada
- Hodgson, Manitoba, a village in Manitoba, Canada
- Hodgson Lake, a subglacial lake in Antarctica
- Hodgson Lake (Renville County, Minnesota), a lake in Renville County, Minnesota, United States
- Hodgson River, a river in the Northern Territory, Australia

Companies

- E. F. Hodgson Company, a 20th-century US mail-order company
- Ferrier Hodgson, an Australia-Asia Pacific accountancy company

Other

- 2888 Hodgson, a main-belt asteroid
- Hodgson Report, a report by the Society for Psychical Research (SPR) in 1884
- USC&GS Hodgson (CSS 26), a coastal survey ship in commission in the United States Coast and Geodetic Survey from 1946 to 1967

== See also ==
- Hodgsonia
