= Telfair =

Telfair may refer to:

== People ==
=== Given name ===
- Telfair Hodgson (1840–1893), American academic administrator
- Telfair Hodgson Jr. (1876–1952), American academic administrator, banker, developer

=== Surname ===
- Charles Telfair (1778–1833), Irish botanist
- Edward Telfair (1735–1807), multi-term governor of Georgia, U.S.
- Jessie Telfair (1913–1986), American textile artist
- Mary Telfair (1791–1875), benefactor of Savannah's Telfair Museums and Mary Telfair Women's Hospital
- Richard Telfair, pen-name of American writer Richard Jessup (1925–1982)
- Sebastian Telfair (born 1985), American basketball player
- Thomas Telfair (1786–1818), United States Representative from Georgia

== Places ==
- Telfair County, Georgia
- Telfair Museums, the first art museum in the American South, in Savannah GA
  - Telfair Academy, early 19th-century building housing historic art
  - Telfair Arms Apartments, formerly Telfair Hospital
- Telfair, Sugar Land, a community in Texas

== Ships ==
- USS Telfair (APA-210), a Haskell-class attack transport
- Gussie Telfair, a merchant steamship built in 1862, formerly USS Gertrude

== Other uses ==
- Telfair's skink, a Mauritian lizard
