= Frank Knox (cricketer) =

English cricketer

Frank Pery Knox DSO (23 January 1880 – 1 February 1960) was an English first-class cricketer active 1899–1902 who played for Surrey.

He was born in Clapham, the fifth son of Sir Ralph Henry Knox, a civil servant and former cricketer, and Georgina Augusta Chance. Neville Knox was his younger brother. He was educated at Dulwich College and Corpus Christi College, Oxford, and died in Hove.

During World War I, he was an officer in the Army Service Corps; along with many other officers he was awarded the DSO in the 1918 Birthday Honours "for services rendered in connection with Military Operations in France and Flanders."
