= Francis Roger Hodgson =

British Anglican missionary and Bible translator

Francis Roger Hodgson (1853 – 4 April 1920) was a British Anglican missionary and Bible translator in Zanzibar, and later a parish priest in Devon, England.

== Early life ==
He was born on 21 October 1853 in Southport, the eldest son of the Rev. Richard Hodgson, son of Francis Roger Hodgson of Manchester, and his wife Caroline Fletcher, fifth daughter of the Rev. Charles Fletcher of Southwell, Nottinghamshire; his parents were married in 1852. His father was rector of Pilton, Northamptonshire from 1858 to 1870. He had a younger brother, Charles Herbert Hodgson, also a cleric, who became a master at Sherborne School.

When Hodgson was young, his father was from 1854 to 1858 a curate at Warton, Fylde and Freckleton in Lancashire, parish of Kirkham, nominated by the incumbent the Rev. Thomas Henry Dundas, a Trinity College, Dublin graduate involved with the Society for Propagation of the Gospel. He was educated at Rugby School, and matriculated at Corpus Christi College, Oxford in 1873, aged 19, graduating B.A. in 1876, and M.A. in 1883. He was ordained deacon by William Jacobson in Chester Cathedral in 1877.

== Missionary and translator ==
Edward Steere, Anglican Bishop in Central Africa from 1874, was in England for his health in early 1877. He was successful in recruiting for the Universities' Mission to Central Africa. Among those who joined were Hodgson and his wife Jessie. In May 1877 Hodgson wrote to Robert Marshall Heanley on "A Journey from Zanzibar to Magila", Magila on the east coast of Africa being in what is now Muheza District, Tanzania. Hodgson presented a paper at the 1878 Chester diocesan missionary conference, about the Central Africa mission. In it he described the hope that "there might be in time a black bishop on the east coast of Africa as there was already on the west coast."

Hodgson was appointed Archdeacon of Zanzibar in 1882. The Anglican congregation on Zanzibar grew steadily, drawing on formerly enslaved people and others on the margins of society. Hodgson took administrative responsibilities for mission work from Steere, and collaborated on Bible translation work.

Before Steere's death in 1882, he and Hodgson had completed a revised New Testament translation into Swahili. Steere had also begun work on the books of Isaiah, Kings, and Genesis. The British and Foreign Bible Society printed their book of Genesis in 1884. With the assistance of Jessie, Hodgson made the first Old Testament translation into southern Swahili in Roman script. The Zanzibar dialect, Kiunguja, grew in popularity to become standardized written Swahili.

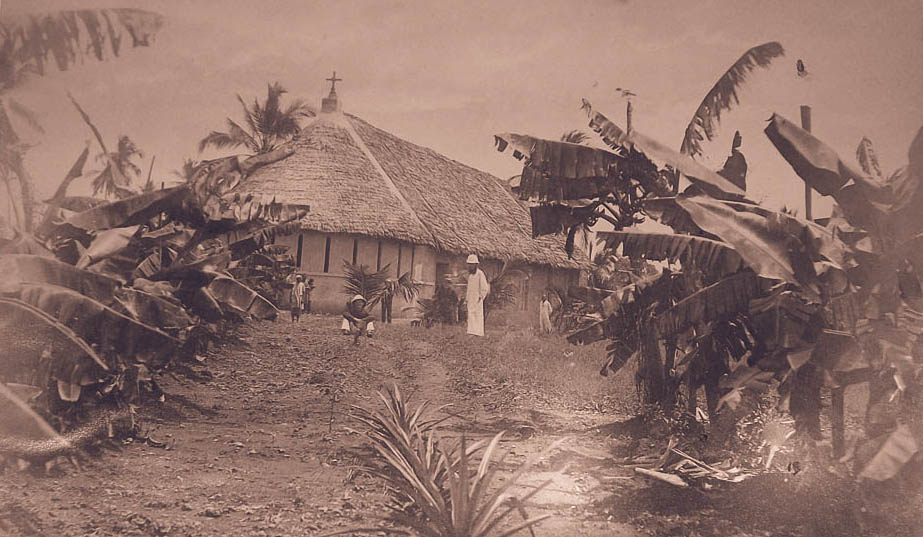
St John's Church, Mbweni, on a former slave estate, completed by Hodgson, photograph c.1880

Hodgson completed work on St John's Church at Mbweni; and he handed over the Mbweni station to William Percival Johnson, a good friend. In 1889, he finished his Old Testament translation, and he and his family returned to England, via the Suez Canal. Further work on the Bible translation was carried out by Arthur Cornwallis Madan.

== Later life ==
In 1890 Hodgson became perpetual curate of Frithelstock, Devon. In 1895, his father Richard died. Later that year, the British and Foreign Bible Society published their translation of the Old Testament from their London print shop. This translation became a reference for George Pilkington as he made the Lugandan Bible translation in the 1890s.

== Family ==
Hodgson's wife Jessie died in 1933 at age 80; she was born in 1853 and had been a medical missionary in Zanzibar. In 1886, she gave birth to their only son, Richard. Mission records indicate that in 1888 Jessie was "invalided".
