= Robert Hodgson =

Robert Hodgson may refer to:

- Robert Willard Hodgson (1893–1966), American botanist, taxonomist and agricultural researcher, specifically a citrus expert
- Sir Robert Hodgson (judge) (1798–1880), Canadian lawyer, politician, judge, and lieutenant governor of Prince Edward Island, 1874–1879
- Sir Robert Hodgson (diplomat) (1874–1956), British diplomat and consul
- Robert Hodgson (cricketer) (born 1973), Australian cricketer
- Robert D. Hodgson (1923–1979), American geographer
- Robert K. Hodgson, Canadian thoroughbred trainer, see Canadian Horse Racing Hall of Fame
- Robert Hodgson (dean of Carlisle) (1776–1844), Anglican dean of Chester, 1815–1820 and of Carlisle, 1820–1844
- Robert Hodgson (archdeacon of Stafford) (1844–1917)
- Bob Hodgson (fl. 1946), English footballer, see 1945–46 Colchester United F.C. season
