= Hutson =

Hutson is a surname. Notable people with the surname include:

- Cole Hutson (born 2006), American ice hockey player
- Cole Hutson (American football) (born 2004), American football player
- Curtis Hutson, American Baptist minister and newspaper editor
- Don Hutson, American football player
- Eyre Hutson, British colonial governor
- James H. Hutson, historian and author of early American history
- John Hutson, former chief Judge Advocate General of the US Navy
- Lane Hutson (born 2004), American ice hockey player
- Leroy Hutson, American musician
  - Hutson (album), a 1975 album by Leroy Hutson
- Quinn Hutson, American ice hockey player
- Richard Hutson, early American judge and politician
- Robin Hutson, British hotelier
- Sean Hutson, American politician from Ohio
- Shaun Hutson, British horror writer
- Tracy Hutson, American actress and television personality
- Wihla Hutson (1901–2002), American organist, composer, and lyricist known for her collaborations with Alfred Burt

== See also ==
- Hudson (disambiguation)
- Hotson
- Hodson (disambiguation)
