= Ralph Henry Knox =

British civil servant and Under-Secretary of state

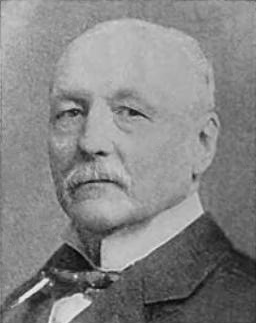

Permanent Under-Secretary of State for War
- In office 1897–1901

Personal details
- Born: 21 April 1836
- Died: 21 July 1913 (aged 77) Surrey, England
- Spouse: Georgina Augusta Chance (m. 1863)
- Children: 6, including Frank Knox and Neville Knox
- Education: Trinity College Dublin
- Occupation: Civil servant

Sir Ralph Henry Knox, KCB, VD, PC (21 April 1836 – 21 July 1913) was a British civil servant. He was Permanent Under-Secretary of State for War from 1897 to 1901.

== Biography ==
Ralph Knox was born on 21 April 1836, the son of Robert Knox, editor of the Morning Herald. He was educated at Trinity College, Dublin. He entered the War Office as a temporary clerk (one of 150 appointed as a result of the Crimean War) in January 1856 and was added to the establishment as junior clerk in 1858. After serving as secretary of two royal commissions, Knox was appointed Accountant-General at the War Office in 1882. In 1897, he was promoted Permanent Under-Secretary of State for War in 1897, serving until his retirement 1901.

In retirement, he served on various commissions, including ones connected with the Cardwell Reforms.

Knox was appointed CB in 1880 and promoted KCB in 1895. He was sworn of the Privy Council in 1903.

In 1863, he married Georgina Augusta Chance. They had six sons, including cricketers Frank Knox and Neville Knox, and four daughters.

Know died in 1913 on a train from Oxted, where he resided, to London.
