= The Granville Marina =

Street in Ramsgate, Kent, England

Coordinates: 51°20′7.7″N 1°25′42.7″E

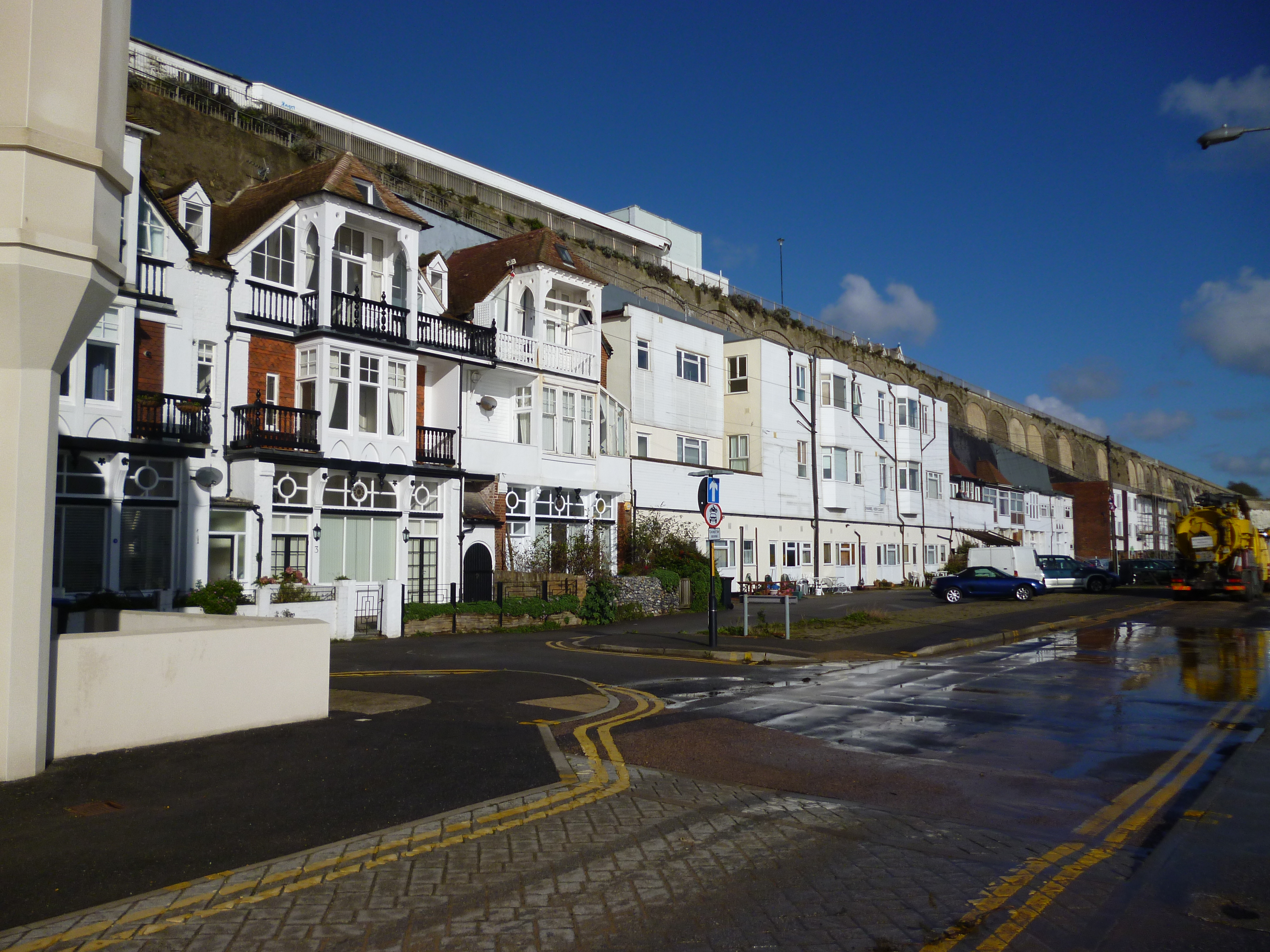
The Granville Marina in 2013

The Granville Marina is a street in Ramsgate, Kent. It was originally a parade of small shops, tea rooms and houses built in 1877 in the Old English style. The site is reached by Marina Road from Victoria Parade. The Marina formed part of the Granville Hotel, Ramsgate complex planned by Edmund Francis Davis. The buildings also included a large hall on the western end Marina Hall - since demolished. The buildings are partly built into the chalk cliffs below the former hotel.

The Marina was opened by the Mayor of London (Sir Thomas White) on Thursday 5 July 1877. The architect was J T Wimperis and the contractor was Messrs Paramor and Son, of Margate. In the early 1970s the shops were converted into private flats. Numbers 1-4 were Grade II listed on 21 December 2004. Number 1 Granville Marina, formerly a photographic studio (Frederick T Palmer), was demolished in February 2008.

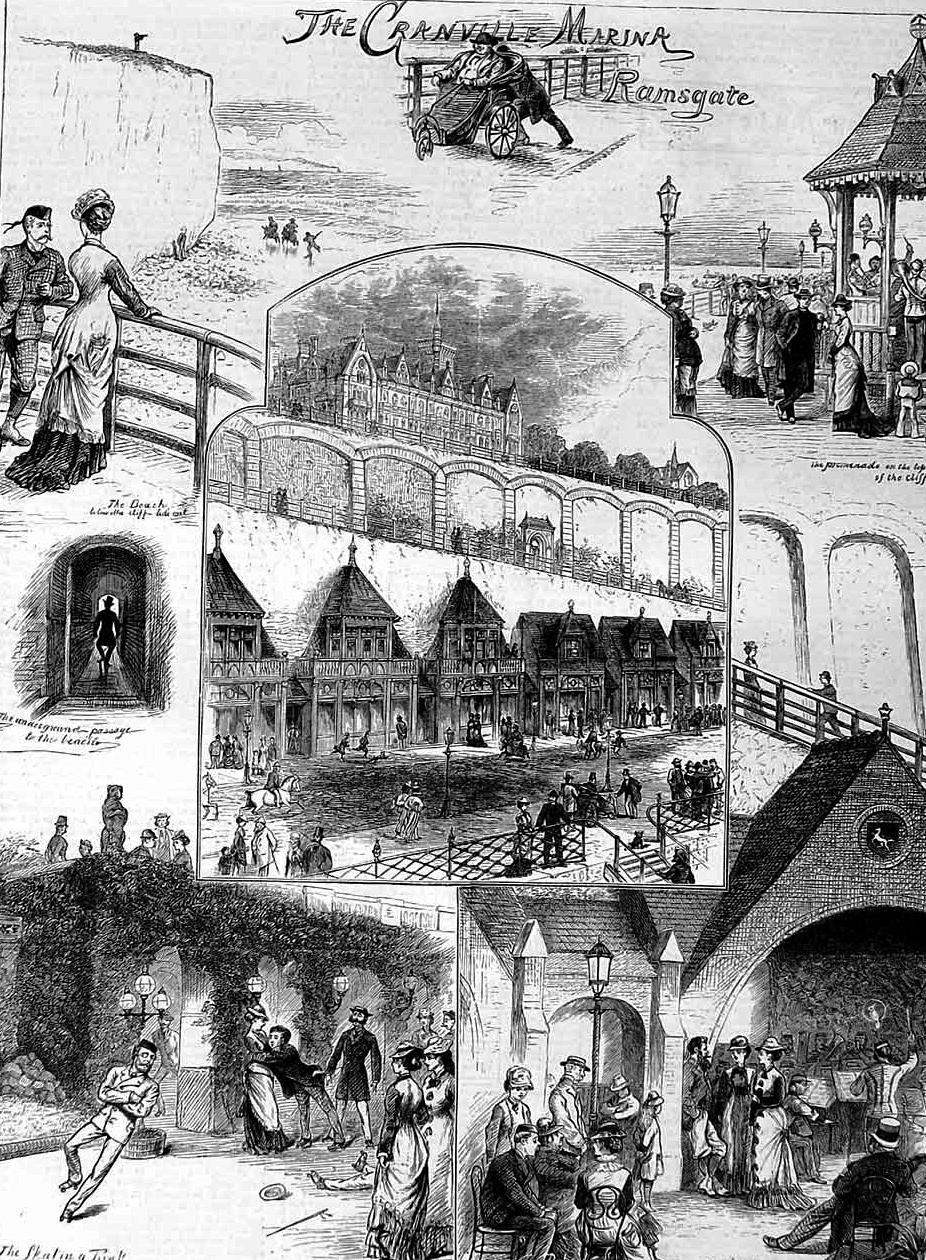
Granville Marina, The Graphic, 25 August 1877

The Graphic wrote of the Marina in 1877:

This magnificent promenade and carriage drive has been constructed for the purpose of affording a more direct means of communication between the Upper East Cliff and the railway station on the sands below. The idea originated with the proprietor, Mr Edmund F Davis, who, with the assistance of Mr J T Wimperis, the architect, has succeeded in giving Ramsgate a novel and most delightful attraction. The main object was, of course, the zig-zag roadway cut out of the cliff, but with this was incorporated a scheme for its embellishment which has been most successfully carried out. The erewhile dreary-looking cliff has been transformed into a charming garden, and along the perpendicular rock excavations have been made an fitted up in quaint Old English style of architecture with shops, restaurants etc, and there are a number of clever-contrived subways and flights of steps, which serve as short cuts from one part of the cliff to another. At the “elbow” of the winding roadway stands the “Establishment,” which is to be devoted to musical and other attractive entertainments. This building is in the same style as the shops, and is constructed of red brick with white stone carvings. The entrance has a noble façade, above which is a large circular window containing the Granville Arms; and windows of stained glass, with allegorical symbols of Music and the sister arts. The hall is fifty feet wide and more than 100 feet in length. It is tastefully decorated in colour and gold, and lighted by an ornamental skylight and side windows of tinted glass, and the recesses around the walls are arranged as an aquarium and winter gardens. Some idea of the enormous difficulties which had to be surmounted, and were actually overcome in the short space of three months, may be gathered from the following facts and figures: 80,000 tons of chalk were removed from the cliff. The materials used in the construction included 2,500,000 bricks, 15,000 cubic feet of timber, 50,000 superficial feet of boarding, 1,000 cubic feet of stone; 1,200 loads of sand, 300 of flints, 200 of gravel, 450 tons of cement, 300 of lime, and 4 of nails, 130,000 tiles, 8,000 feet of glass, 78 tons of ironwork, and more than 7,000 feet of iron piping.
