= Hutsol =

Hutsol is a surname. Notable people with the surname include:

- Anna Hutsol (born 1984), Ukrainian activist
- Yevhen Hutsol (born 1990), Ukrainian sprinter

== See also ==
- Hutson
