= Fred Hodgson =

Fred Hodgson may refer to:

- J. F. Hodgson (1867–1947), English socialist activist
- Fred W. Hodgson (1886–1930), American architect

== See also ==
- Frederick Hodgson (disambiguation)
