= Hodson (disambiguation) =

Hodson is an English surname.

Hodson may also refer to:

== Places ==
- Hodson, California, U.S.
- Hodson, Nova Scotia, Canada
- Hodson, Wiltshire, England

== Other uses ==
- Hodson Award, American Bar Association award for a public service organization
- Hodson baronets, baronetcy in the Peerage of Ireland
- 4th Horse (Hodson's Horse), cavalry regiment of the Indian Army founded by William Stephen Raikes Hodson

== See also ==
- Hudson (disambiguation)
- Hodgson
