= Tim Hodgson (cricketer) =

English cricketer

Personal information
- Full name: Timothy Philip Hodgson
- Born: 27 March 1975 (age 51); Guildford, Surrey, England
- Batting: Left-handed
- Relatives: James Hodgson (brother); Neville Knox (great-uncle)

Domestic team information
- Years: Team
- 2000–2001: Surrey Cricket Board
- 1996–1999: Essex

Career statistics
Competition	FC	LA
Matches	11	16
Runs scored	361	376
Batting average	18.05	25.06
100s/50s	0/1	1/1
Top score	54	113
Balls bowled	54	0
Wickets	1	–
Bowling average	34.00	–
5 wickets in innings	0	–
10 wickets in match	0	–
Best bowling	1/34	–
Catches/stumpings	4/–	2/–
- Source: Cricinfo, 31 October 2010

Timothy Philip Hodgson (born 27 March 1975) is a former English cricketer. Hodgson was a left-handed batsman. He was born at Guildford, Surrey, and educated at Wellington College and Durham University.

Hodgson made his debut for Essex in a List A match against Gloucestershire in the 1996 AXA Equity and Law League. From 1996 to 1998, he represented the county in 8 List A matches, the last of which came against Leicestershire in the 1998 AXA League. While representing Essex, Hodgson was also undertaking further education with Durham University. It was while studying there that he represented a British Universities team in 5 List A matches in 1997, the last of which came against Hampshire.

Hodgson also represented Essex in first-class cricket, making his debut for the county in that format against Kent in 1997. From 1997 to 1999, he represented the county in 11 first-class matches, the last of which came against Oxford University. In those 11 matches, he scored 361 runs at an average of 18.05, with a single half century high score of 54. In the field he took 4 catches. With the ball he took a single wicket a bowling average of 34.00, with best figures of 1/34.

In the 2000 NatWest Trophy, Hodgson made his debut in List A cricket for the Surrey Cricket Board against Shropshire. He played 2 further List A matches for the Board against Huntingdonshire and Surrey, both in the 2001 Cheltenham & Gloucester Trophy. In his combined total of 16 List A matches, he scored 376 runs at an average of 25.06, with a single half century and a single century high score of 113. In the field he took 2 catches.

== Family ==
His brother, James, played first-class cricket for Cambridge University. His great-uncle, Neville Knox, played Test cricket for England as well as first-class cricket for Surrey and the Marylebone Cricket Club.
