= Edward Hodgson =

Edward Hodgson may refer to:

- Edward Hodgson (cricketer) (1813–1882), English clergyman and cricketer
- Edward Hodgson (painter) (1719–1794), Irish painter
- Edward S. Hodgson (1866–1937), Scottish artist
- Ted Hodgson (born 1945), Canadian ice hockey forward
- Teddy Hodgson (1885–1919), English footballer
