= Granville Theatre, Ramsgate =

Theatre and cinema complex in Ramsgate, England

Coordinates: 51°20′08″N 1°25′40″E

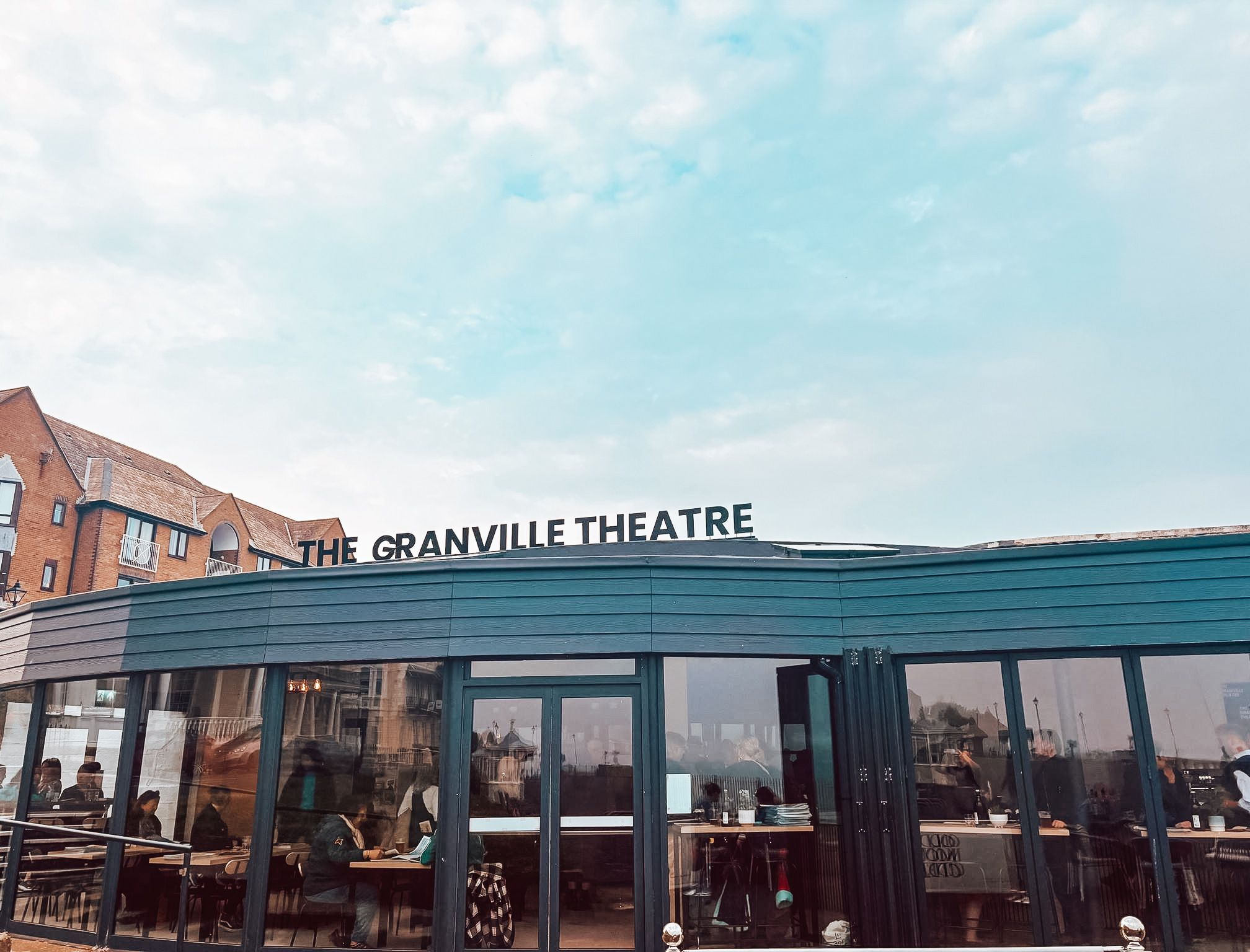

The Granville Theatre complex is located in Victoria Parade, Ramsgate, Kent, and is the town's sole multi-purpose entertainment venue. The theatre derived its name from the Granville Hotel, Ramsgate opposite. The building was sold by Thanet District Council to Westwood One Ltd for £125,000 in 2022.

== History ==
The old Granville Pavilion was damaged beyond repair in WW2 and was subsequently demolished. A new building was planned on the same site by the Borough Engineer (Mr R. D. Brimmell). The New Granville Theatre, as it was originally known, was designed by the architect Mr W. Garwood at a cost of £13,100. After the war, building materials were in short supply. This meant that every usable brick from the old building was brought into use, with new blocks being made in the town. The theatre was declared open by the Mayor of Ramsgate (Alderman S. E. Austin) on Saturday 21 June 1947.

The Granville Theatre's Patron during this time was the celebrated and award-winning actress Brenda Blethyn.

The theatre and cinema closed in March 2020 as a result of the COVID-19 pandemic and was put up for sale in May 2022.

The Granville Theatre reopened its doors on the 27th May 2023. It is now a 600-seater auditorium and Thanet's sole multi-purpose entertainment venue. Owned by local business, Westwood One Ltd. It has since welcomed Live Music, Touring Productions, Comedians, Pantomimes and much more, its most recent production was a staged pantomime version of Aladdin.

There is now also an on-site café, improved toiletries, and bar Coast.
