= Ray B. West Building =

Coordinates: 41°44′24″N 111°48′46″W

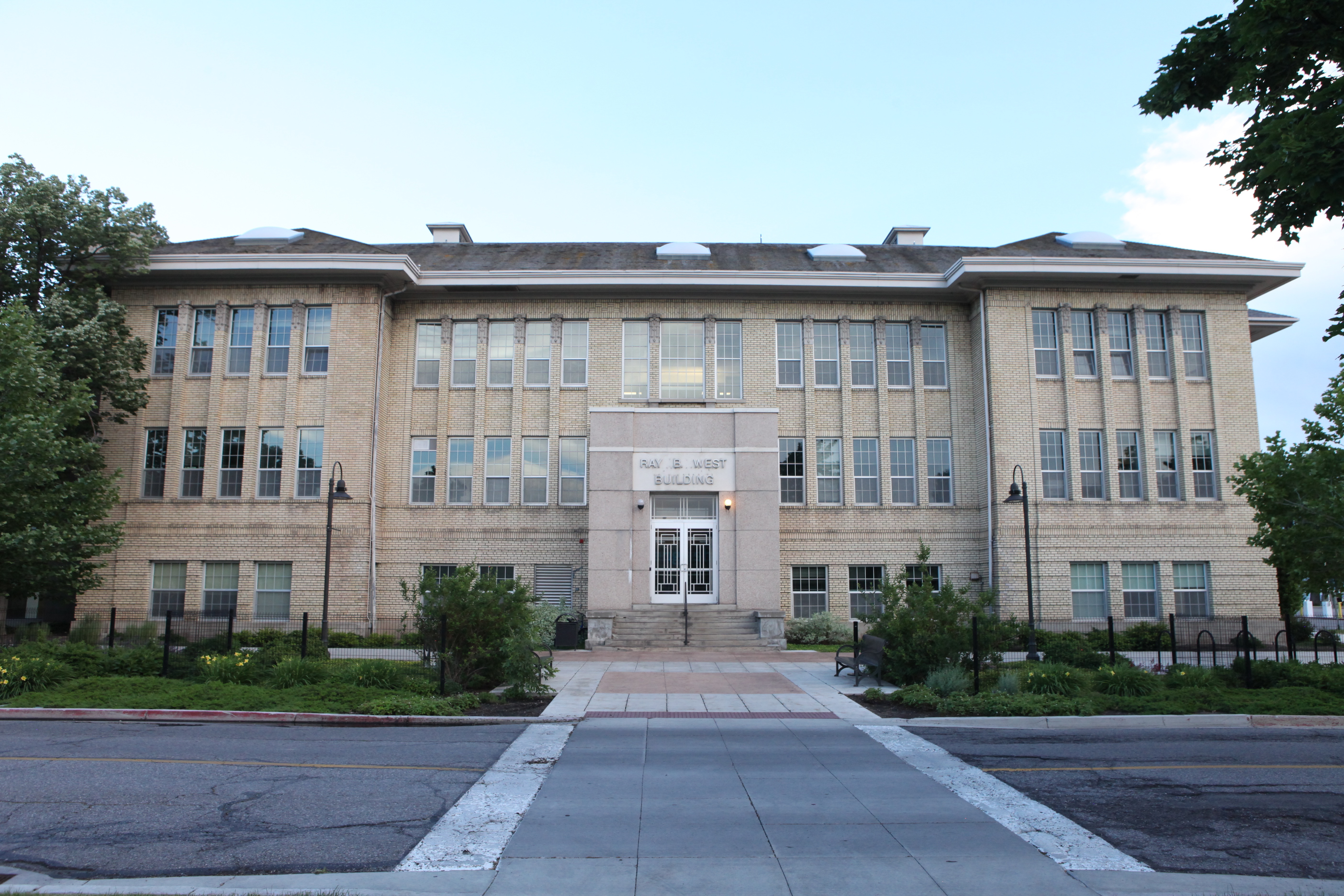
Ray B. West Building

The Ray B. West Building is a historic building on the campus of Utah State University in Logan, Utah.

The building was designed by architect Fred W. Hodgson and was built in 1918. It houses the College of Humanities and Social Sciences' Department of English and USU Writing Center.
