= Andrew Hodgson =

Andrew Hodgson may refer to:

- Andrew Hodgson (translator) (born 1994), Japanese-to-English translator
- Andrew Hodgson (rugby) (born 1976), rugby league and rugby union footballer who played in the 1990s
- Andrew Hodgson (cricketer) (born 1941), former New Zealand born South African cricketer
- Andy Hodgson, auctioneer/presenter on the British television shopping channel bid tv and TJC
- Andrew Hodgson (novelist), British writer
