= Christopher Hudson =

Christopher Hudson may refer to:

- Chris Hudson (American football) (born 1971), American football player
- Chris Hudson (trade unionist), Irish trade unionist and Unitarian minister

== See also ==
- Christie Brinkley, American model born Christie Hudson
- Sydney Hudson, British alpine skier (1910–2005), born Christopher Sydney Hudson
- Christopher Hodson (disambiguation)
