= Christopher Hodson =

Christopher Hodson may refer to:

- Christopher Hodson (bellfounder) (died c. 1696), English bellfounder
- Christopher Hodson (director) (1929–2015), British television director
- Christopher Hodson (judge), New Zealand barrister and judge

== See also ==
- Christopher Hodgson (disambiguation)
- Christopher Hudson (disambiguation)
