= James Hodgson (cricketer, born 1969) =

Personal information
- Full name: James Simon Hodgson
- Born: 30 April 1969 (age 57); Guildford, Surrey, England
- Batting: Right-handed
- Bowling: Right-arm off break
- Relatives: Tim Hodgson (brother), Neville Knox (great-uncle)

Domestic team information
- Years: Team
- 1994: Cambridge University

Career statistics
Competition	First-class
Matches	9
Runs scored	256
Batting average	18.28
100s/50s	–/1
Top score	54
Balls bowled	1,635
Wickets	15
Bowling average	48.80
5 wickets in innings	–
10 wickets in match	–
Best bowling	4/14
Catches/stumpings	8/–
- Source: Cricinfo, 31 October 2010

James Simon Hodgson (born 30 April 1969) was the Headmaster of Bedford School and a former English cricketer.

== Biography ==
Born in Guildford, Surrey, on 30 April 1969, James Hodgson was educated at Wellington College and Durham University. He continued his studies at Hughes Hall, Cambridge. He taught at Tonbridge School, was Usher at Magdalen College School, Oxford, and became the Headmaster of Bedford School in 2014, before leaving in 2026.

== Cricket ==
James Hodgson was a right-handed batsman who bowled right-arm off break. He made his first-class debut for Cambridge University against Nottinghamshire in 1994. During the 1994 season, he represented the university in 9 first-class matches, the last of which came against Oxford University. In those 9 matches, he scored 256 runs at a batting average of 18.28, with a single half century high score of 54. In the field he took 8 catches. With the ball he took 15 wickets at a bowling average of 48.80, with best figures of 4/14.

== Family ==
James Hodgson's brother, Tim, played first-class cricket for Essex as well as List A cricket for the Surrey Cricket Board. His great-uncle, Neville Knox, played Test cricket for England as well as first-class cricket for Surrey and the Marylebone Cricket Club.
