= Benjamin F. Cheatham =

Civil War (CSA) general (1820–1886)

Major-General Benjamin Franklin Cheatham
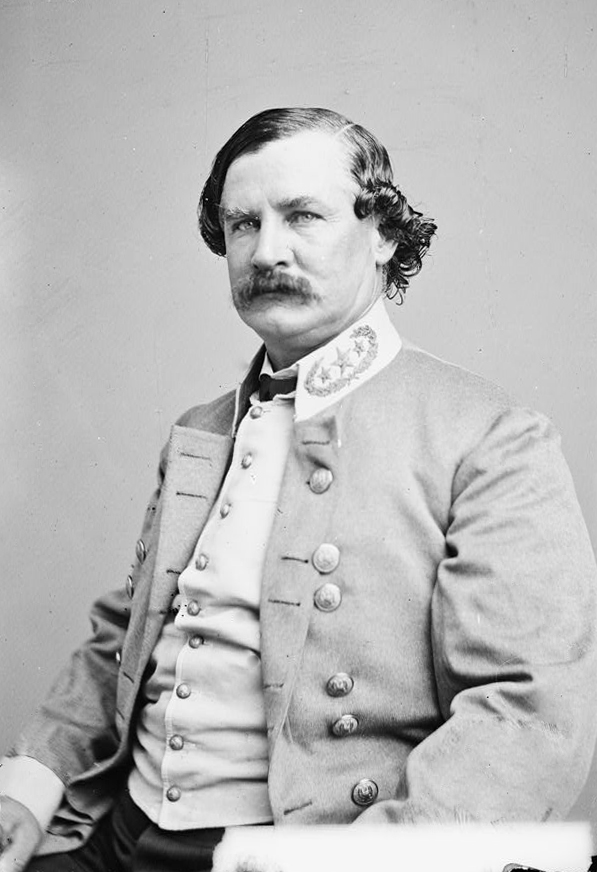
- General Cheatham during the Civil War
- Born: October 20, 1820; Nashville, Tennessee, US
- Died: September 4, 1886 (aged 65); Nashville, Tennessee, US
- Burial place: Mount Olivet Cemetery, Nashville, Tennessee
- Military career
- Allegiance: United States; Confederate States of America
- Branch: US Army; Confederate Army
- Service years: 1846–1848 (USA); 1861–1865 (CSA)
- Rank: Colonel (USA); Major General (CSA)
- Conflicts: Mexican–American War; American Civil War: Battle of Belmont; Battle of Shiloh; Battle of Perryville; Battle of Stones River; Battle of Chickamauga; Chattanooga campaign; Atlanta campaign; Franklin-Nashville Campaign; Carolinas campaign

Benjamin Franklin Cheatham (October 20, 1820 – September 4, 1886) was a Confederate general during the American Civil War. He served in the Army of Tennessee, inflicting many casualties on Gen. Sherman at Kennesaw Mountain, Georgia, but took the blame for General Schofield's escape at Spring Hill – a major factor in the Confederate defeat at Franklin, Tennessee in 1864. Later in life, he became a gold miner in California and a plantation owner in his home state of Tennessee.

== Early life and education ==
Cheatham was born in Nashville, Tennessee, on a plantation called Westover, which in its prime consisted of three thousand acres (12 km^{2}). He was born into two of the most prominent families of the middle Tennessee elite of the slave society. His mother was descended from General James Robertson, the founder of Nashville and "father" of Middle Tennessee, who came from Virginia. The Cheathams had been in middle Tennessee for two generations and become established as plantation owners, lawyers, doctors and mayors of the city.

== Antebellum years ==
At the start of the Mexican–American War, Cheatham joined the 1st Tennessee Infantry Regiment as a captain and finished the war having been promoted to colonel of the 3rd Tennessee. He moved to California in 1849 for the Gold Rush, but returned to Tennessee in 1853.

He managed his plantation and served as a brigadier general in the Tennessee militia.

== Civil War ==
Cheatham joined the Confederate States Army as a brigadier general on May 9, 1861, from Stockton, California, becoming one of at least four generals from California who served the Confederacy in the war.

Cheatham was brigade commander in the Western District of Department Number Two, under Maj. Gen. Leonidas Polk. His first test in the war was in Missouri on November 7 at the Battle of Belmont, leading three regiments in Brig. Gen. Gideon J. Pillow's division against Union Brig. Gen. Ulysses S. Grant, also in his first Civil War combat. In December, Cheatham and his division received the thanks of the Confederate Congress "for the desperate courage they exhibited in sustaining for several hours, and under most disadvantageous circumstances an attack by a force of the enemy greatly superior to their own, both in numbers and appointments; and for the skill and gallantry by which they converted what at first threatened so much disaster, into a triumphant victory."

Cheatham was promoted to major general, on March 10, 1862, and was appointed commander of the 2nd Division, First Corps, Army of Mississippi. He led his division at the Battle of Shiloh and was wounded, although it is unclear whether this occurred on April 6 or April 7, 1862. General Braxton Bragg became commander of the Army (soon to be designated the Army of Tennessee) and Cheatham served under him at Perryville and Stones River. At the latter battle, Cheatham performed sluggishly, ordering piecemeal assaults; observers claimed he had been drinking heavily and was unable to command his units effectively. However, Pvt. Sam Watkins, author of Company Aytch, claims to have personally witnessed Cheatham leading a charge on the Wilkerson Turnpike during the battle, indicating that he performed gallantly during that part of the battle, at least.

Cheatham continued as a division commander under Bragg at the Battle of Chickamauga and, following that rare Confederate victory in the West, in the battles around Chattanooga, including Missionary Ridge, where Bragg was defeated by Grant. He helped block the Union Army in the final hours of the battle.

In 1864, Cheatham fought well in the Atlanta campaign under General Joseph E. Johnston, and later Lt. Gen. John Bell Hood, inflicting heavy casualties on William T. Sherman's Union Army at the Battle of Kennesaw Mountain, and was wounded at the Battle of Ezra Church. He took over command of Hood's corps when Hood was elevated to command the army on July 18, and led his corps in the battles around Atlanta.

Cheatham's most famous service came as a corps commander under Hood in the Franklin-Nashville Campaign. He was engaged in all the major battles of the campaign, receiving notoriety when the Union Army under Maj. Gen. John M. Schofield was able to slip by him and escape from the Battle of Spring Hill, which foiled Hood's plan and led to the disastrous Confederate defeat at Franklin the next day. Hood accused Cheatham of dereliction of duty and the enmity between them lasted for the rest of their lives. Hood's recently discovered papers, which include numerous letters based on supposition and hearsay from high-level generals, fail to confirm that Cheatham refused to execute Hood's orders to block the turnpike and that he was against launching a night attack. After the collapse of Hood's army at Nashville, Cheatham joined Johnston's motley command for the Carolinas campaign as a division commander, the highest position this small army could justify. He surrendered to General Sherman in North Carolina in April 1865.

During the war, Cheatham rode the horse Old Isham, named after Isham Harris, the Confederate Governor of Tennessee.

== Postbellum life ==
=== Marriage and family ===
Shortly after the war, he married in his 40s for the first time, to Anna Bell Robertson of North Carolina (she was no relation to his line of Robertsons). She was the sister of one of his war-time aides. They had five children together: Benjamin Franklin Jr., Patton Robertson, Joseph Johnston, Medora Cheatham Hodgson, and Alice.

Their son Benjamin Franklin Cheatham, Jr. (1867–1944) was a major general in the U.S. Army, serving in the Spanish–American War and World War I. In the former, he was defeated by General Juan Cailles's forces in the Battle of Mabitac. Cheatham, Jr. served as quartermaster general from 1926 to 1930. During his tenure in the latter position, he supervised landscaping improvements to Arlington National Cemetery, including restoration of the Lee Mansion and the building of the Tomb of the Unknowns. He is buried at Arlington.

Their daughter Medora married Telfair Hodgson Jr., the treasurer of Sewanee: The University of the South and a developer of Belle Meade, Tennessee, whose own father, Telfair Hodgson, was Sewanee's third vice chancellor.

=== Work life ===
After the war, Cheatham declined an offer of Federal civil service employment from President Grant.

He was an unsuccessful candidate for the United States House of Representatives in Tennessee's 1872 at-large congressional district special election, in which former President Andrew Johnson, after seeing that the Democratic nomination for the district would likely go to Cheatham, ran as an independent, throwing the election to Republican Horace Maynard.

He served for four years as the appointed superintendent of a Tennessee state prison. He was appointed postmaster of Nashville (1885–1886). He died in Nashville and is buried there in Mount Olivet Cemetery.

== Legacy and honors ==
After the war, a camp of the Association of Confederate Soldiers Tennessee Division was named the Frank Cheatham Bivouac in honor of the Confederate general.

Cheatham County, Tennessee is also possibly named after him along with Edward Saunders Cheatham.

Cheatham Hill at Kennesaw Mountain in Cobb County, Georgia is named in honor of the Confederate general for his victory at the Battle of Kennesaw Mountain.

== See also ==
- List of American Civil War generals (Confederate)
