= Huai C. Chiang =

American entomologist

Huai C. Chiang (15 February 1915 – 30 March 2005) was an American entomologist of Chinese origin. A professor of entomology at the University of Minnesota he was a specialist on integrated pest management, particularly in corn and other field crops.

Chiang was born in Sunjiang County, Jiansu Province and after studying in Beijing, he moved to Tsinghua University in 1934. He became interested in insects when he worked in summer with Liu Chongle. With the war between Japan and China on, his studies were interrupted and along with 250 classmates, they walked for 68 days to escape from Changsha to Kunming in April 1938. Chiang then worked with Liu at the Tsinghua University which also moved to Kunming. Here he met Zoe-ing Shen, a chemist at the university who he married later. During the second world war, the US air force used Kunming as a base and Chiang interacted with Sam Billings who worked with a US Army anti-malaria unit. Chiang then applied to the University of Minnesota while Zoe joined Smith College in Northampton, MA. Chiang was to study under Royal N. Chapman but by the time he arrived in the US, Chapman had died and his advisor was A.C. Hodson. Chiang and Zoe married in 1946. After completing his PhD he took up a temporary position at the University of Minnesota and in 1953 he obtained a teaching position and a bit later, a tenure track position. He became noted for his teaching and received a teacher of the year award in 1961. In 1960 he took up a position in insect ecology which he held until his retirement in 1984.

Chiang worked on a range of species and topics including Ostrinia nubilalis in corn, Diabrotica spp., biological control, crop loss evaluation, and the midge Anarete prichardi. He was a visitor to China from 1975 and from 1980 he initiated a collaboration between University of Minnesota and Chinese entomologists. He naturalized as an American citizen in 1953. During the McCarthy era, his background was frequently investigated and Chiang wrote that the FBI officers were "courteous". In 1975 he wrote about how Chinese agriculture was well-managed with fewer pests with more ecological approaches used in control than chemical ones.
