= George Hodgson (disambiguation) =

George Hodgson (1893–1983) was a Canadian swimmer.

George Hodgson may also refer to:

- George Hodgson (fl. 1751), English brewer, see India pale ale
- George Hodgson (cricketer) (1839–1917), English cricketer
- George Hodgson (Royal Navy officer) (1817–1848), English Royal Navy officer and polar explorer
