= James Hodgson =

James Hodgson may refer to:

- James Day Hodgson (1915–2012), American politician
- James Hodgson (cricketer, born 1972), English cricketer
- James Hodgson (cricketer, born 1969), headmaster of Bedford School and English cricketer
- James Hodgson (mathematician) (1672–1755), English mathematical teacher, lecturer and writer
- James Hodgson (merchant) (c. 1790–1870), British merchant
