= Smithfield Public Library =

- U.S. National Register of Historic Places
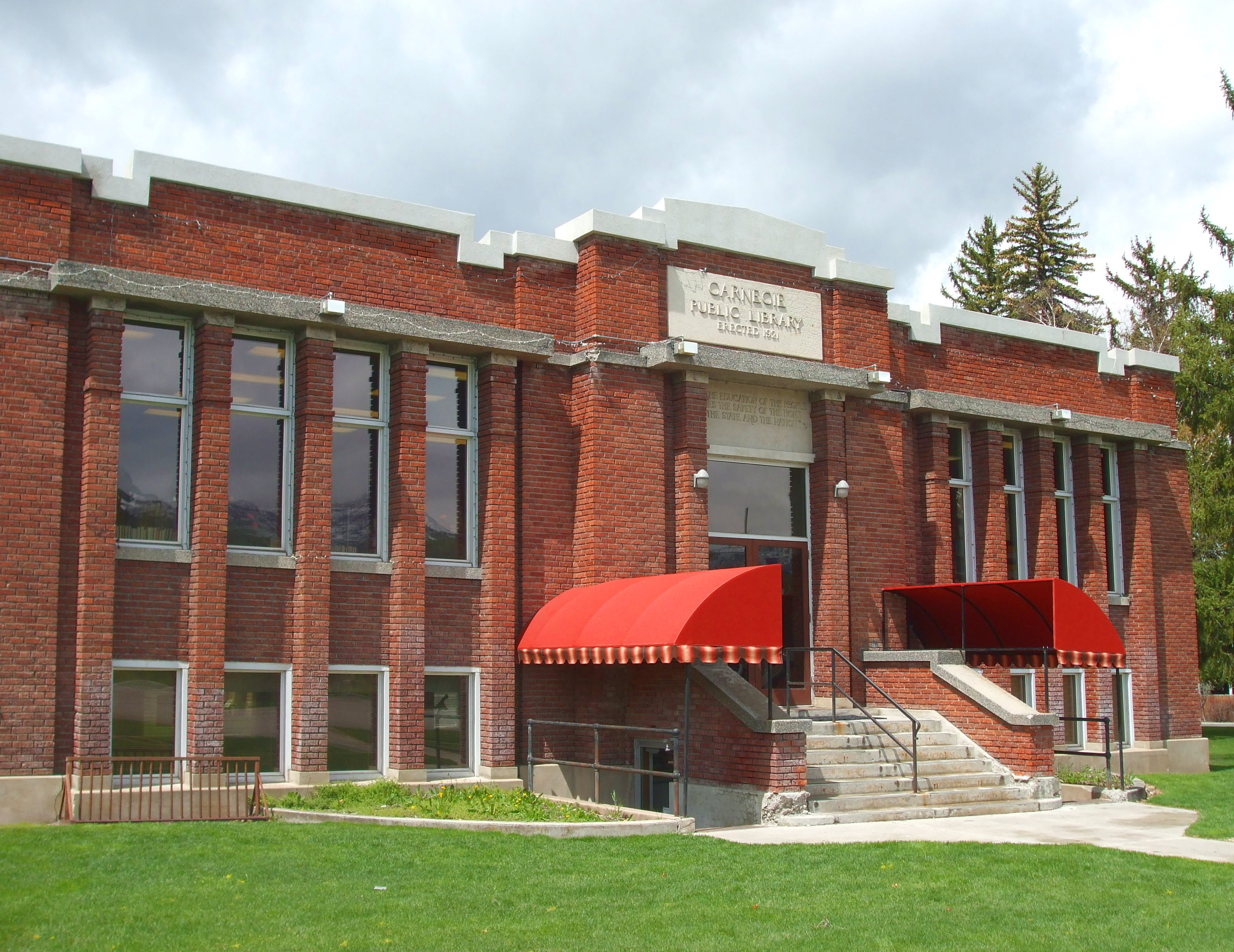

- Location within Utah Location within the United States
- Location: 25 N. Main St., Smithfield, Utah
- Coordinates: 41°50′14″N 111°49′13″W
- Area: less than one acre
- Built: 1921
- Architect: Fred W. Hodgson
- Architectural style: Prairie School
- NRHP reference No.: 81000580
- Added to NRHP: February 17, 1981

The Smithfield Public Library, at 25 N. Main St. in Smithfield, Utah, is a Carnegie library which was built in 1921. It was listed on the National Register of Historic Places in 1981.

It was designed by architect Fred W. Hodgson in Prairie School style.
