= Jack Hodgson =

Jack Hodgson may refer to:

- Jack Hodgson (footballer) (1913–1970), English footballer
- Jack Hodgson (speedway rider) (1915–1989), English speedway rider
- Jack Hodgson, a fictional forensic scientist in the television series Silent Witness

== See also ==
- John Hodgson (disambiguation)
