= The Granville Hotel, Ramsgate =

Hotel in Ramsgate, England

Coordinates: 51°20′7.6″N 1°25′36.6″E

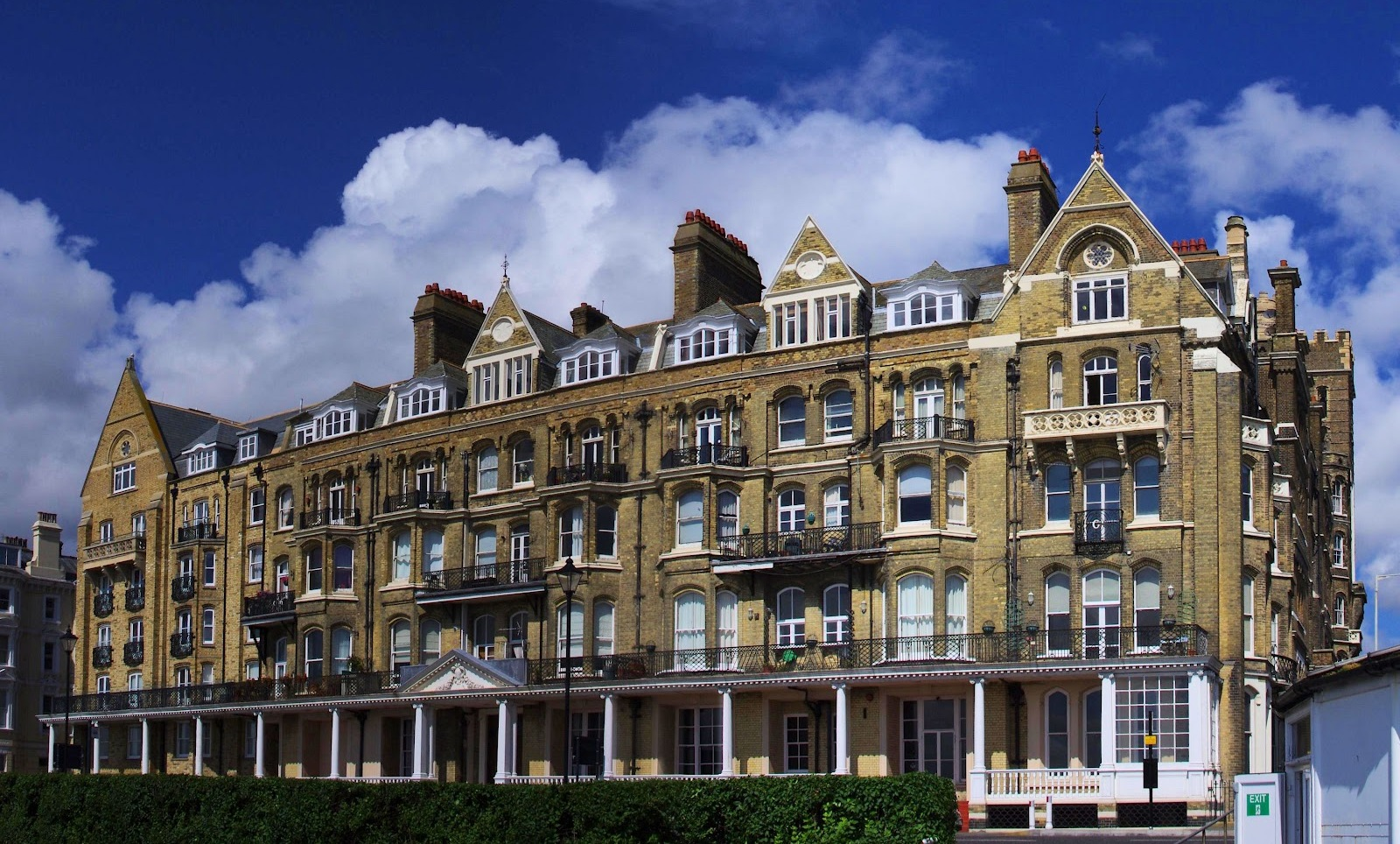
Granville House, Victoria Parade

The Granville Hotel, Ramsgate, Kent, on the southeast coast of England, is a former hotel designed by Edward Welby Pugin, son of Augustus Pugin. Built in 1867 as a terrace of eight houses, The Granville was a hotel between 1869 and 1946 before being sold by proprietors Spiers & Pond. The building is now Granville House, a private residence containing 48 self-contained flats that are managed by the leaseholders.

== History ==
After the death of Augusta Emma d'Este (Lady Truro) on 21 May 1866, the remainder of the land from the Mount Albion Estate was sold off to developers. Business partners Robert Sankey, John Barnet Hodgson and the architect Edward Welby Pugin purchased a plot of land on Ramsgate's east cliff for £9,250. In 1867, they built an eight-house terrace in the Gothic style. These were substantial properties, with four floors and a basement, and each had a private entrance. The houses were marketed as exclusive villas, to be let for weeks at a time to wealthy visitors to Ramsgate who were expected to arrive at the nearby Ramsgate Sands station below the cliff.

The terrace is described by Catriona Blaker in her book Edward Pugin and Kent, his life and work within the county, 2012: "Seen from the front, the main elevation of these very substantial five floor stock brick residences was Gothic – definitely an urban, modern Gothic, not even picturesquely asymmetrical. Each end was the same, grandly gabled, with carefully detailed stone balconies and a large and elegant Gothic window on the fifth floor, and there were bold structural bays and chimneys on the side elevations."

In 1869, the owners decided to convert the building into a hotel that was formally opened with an inaugural ball on 7 December 1869. The new hotel was named "The Granville" in honour of George Leveson Gower, 2nd Earl Granville.

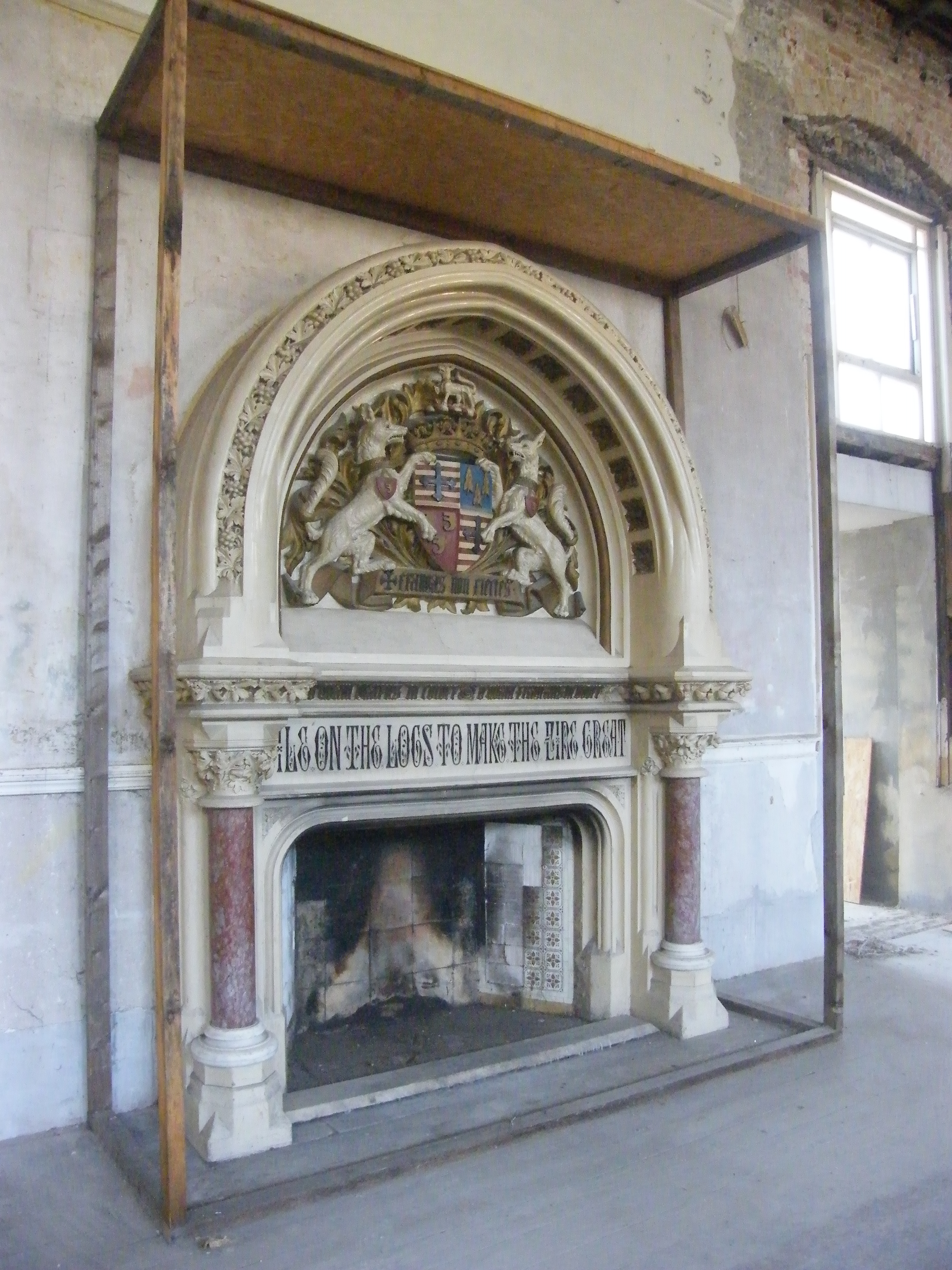
Edward Pugin's fireplace inside Granville House. Supported on red marble columns with the mantel carved in Caen stone, it bears the Granville coat of arms and the motto "pile on the logs to make the fire great". Circa 1869.

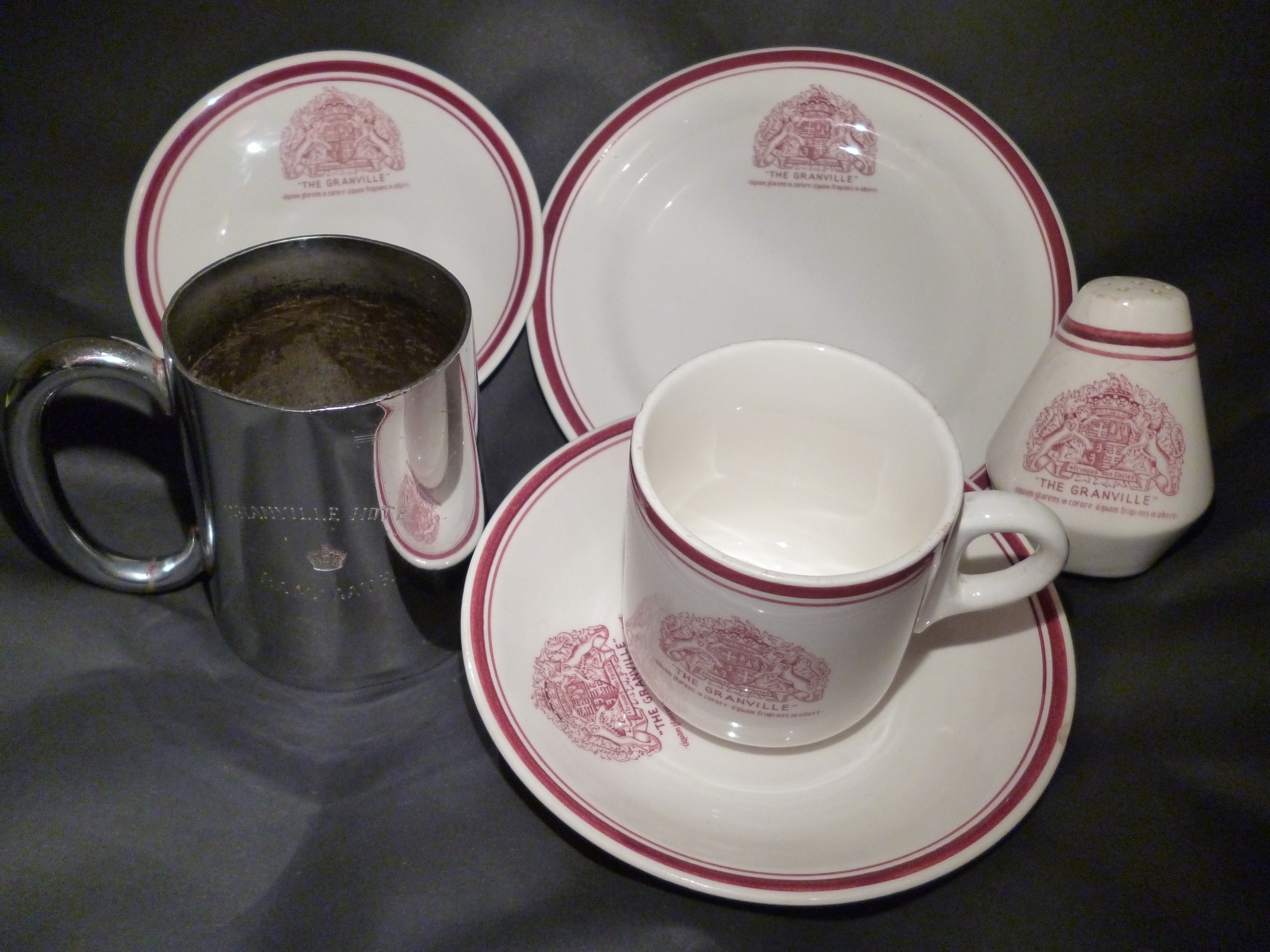
Granville Hotel cup & saucer, pepper shaker, plate and nickel-plated tankard

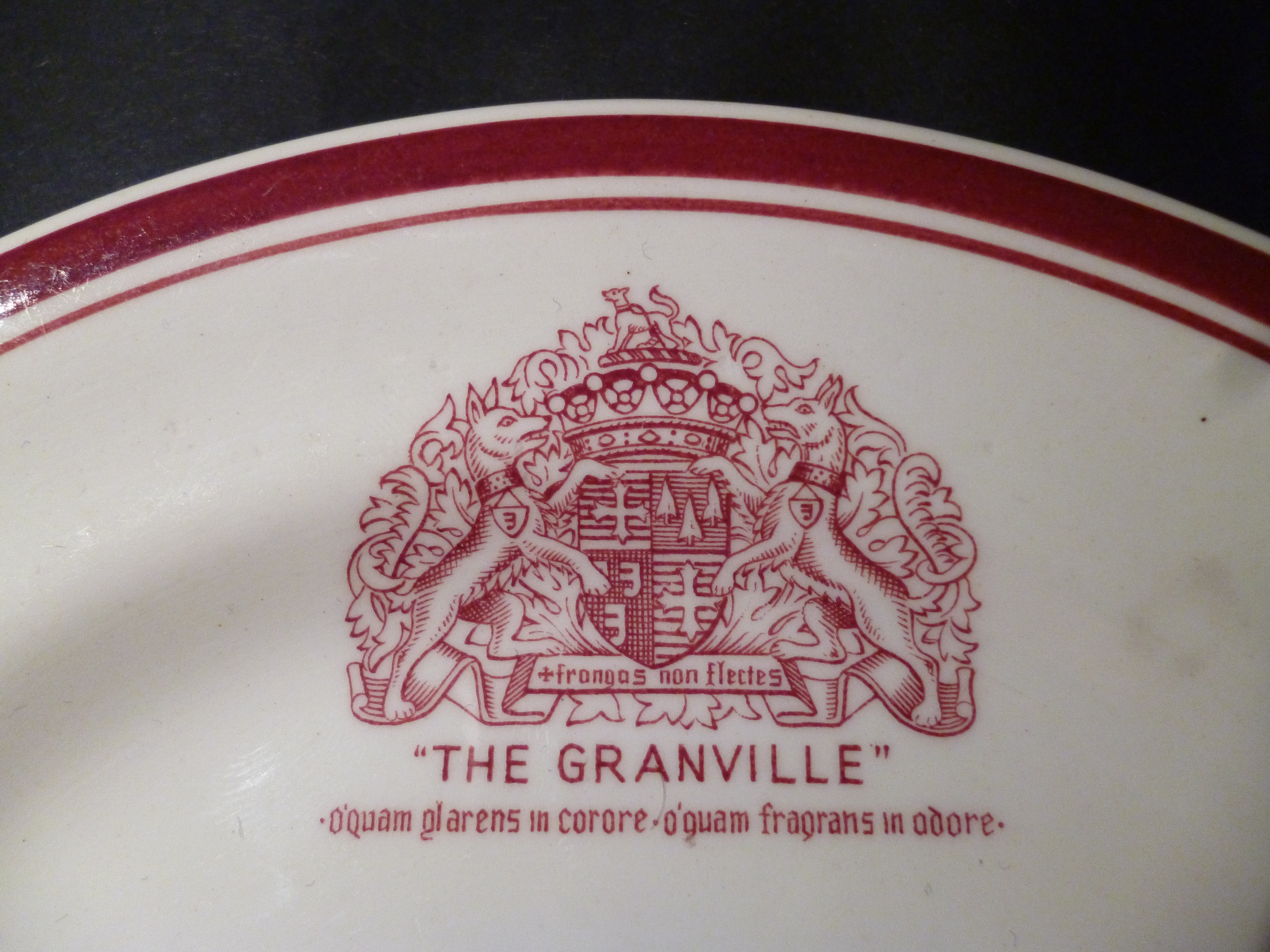
Granville Hotel crest of arms

The Granville was a spa hotel with Victorian Turkish baths amongst over 25 different kinds of bath. Opened on 24 December 1870, the baths, the "everflowing sea-water plunge", and hydropathic establishment were the main features of the hotel throughout its life. The baths were demolished in 1980.

The Granville may have contributed to Edward Pugin's bankruptcy in 1873. In the following years the hotel was owned by the bankers Coutts. An additional hall (New Granville Hall) was designed and completed in July 1874 by the architect J T Wimperis. The hall was demolished in 1982.

The hotel was purchased in 1877 by Edmund Francis Davis, a solicitor and business tycoon who twice contested the Isle of Thanet constituency for the Liberals. Davis developed the Granville Marina below the east cliff, and inaugurated the Granville Express – a daily train service from Charing Cross to Westgate and Ramsgate Sands. Davis also laid a marble skating rink in the Granville Gardens (now Poldark Court), and completed a tunnel begun by Pugin, from the gardens to the sands. The tunnel exits at number 3, Granville Marina.

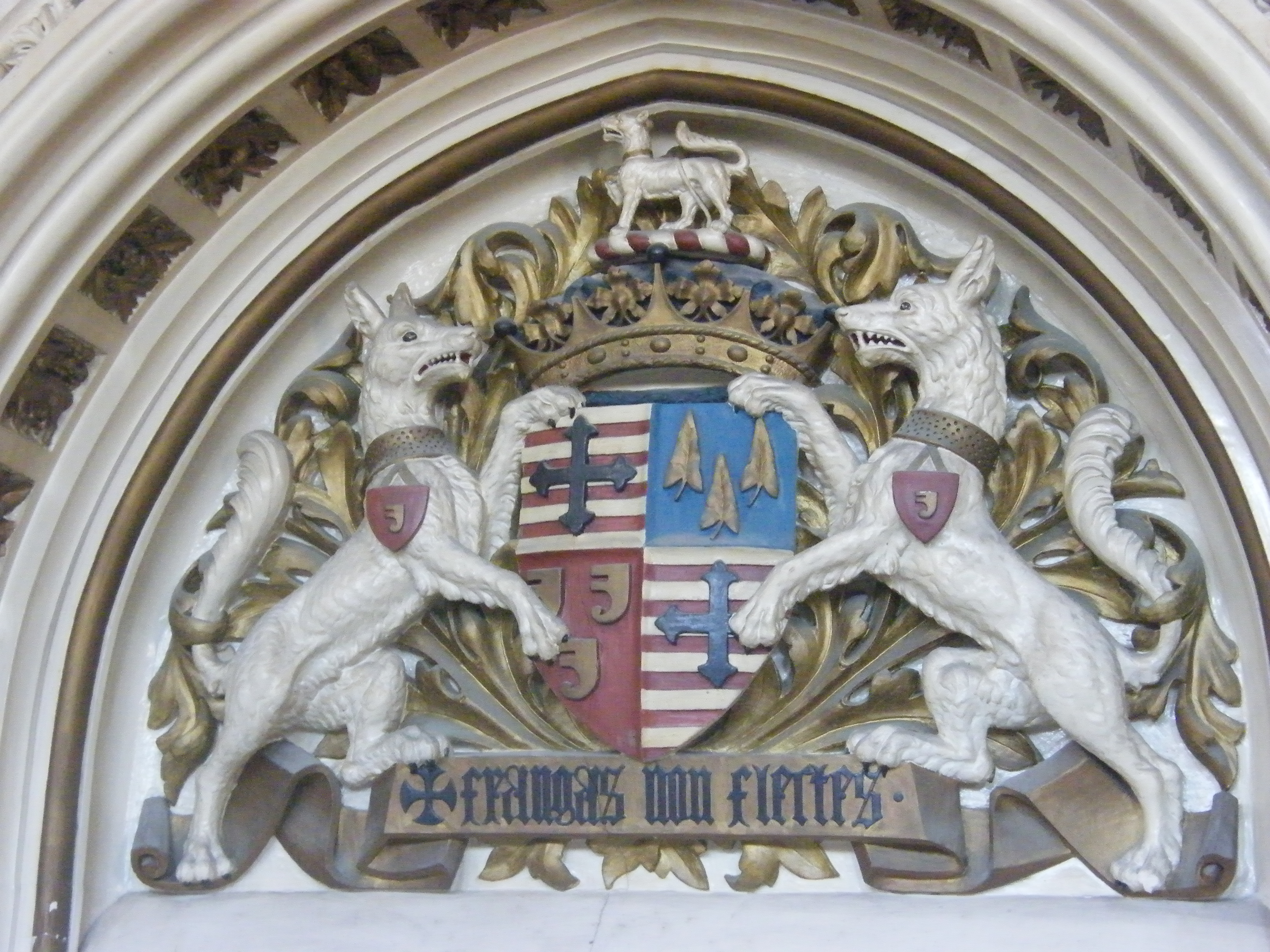
Frangas non flectes – "You may break me, but you shall not bend me"

Throughout the 1880s and 1890s, the hotel suffered frequent bankruptcies before being purchased by Spiers & Pond Ltd in December 1898. The front elevation was altered by the architect Horace Field in 1899, the Granville Tower was lowered and the inside of the building was extensively remodelled.

In January 1915, the Granville was requisitioned by the Government and became The Granville Canadian Special Hospital. It mainly treated patients suffering from shell shock, nerve injuries and injuries to bones and joints. In April 1917 the hospital accommodated 809 wounded Canadian soldiers. The hospital closed in the same year and was relocated to Buxton, Derbyshire.

The Granville reopened in 1920 after a £60,000 modernisation. It was leased to the Empire Hotels Group in the 1930s.

A corner of the hotel was destroyed by enemy action on 12 November 1940. The building had closed and was empty during the raid. The building sits on a network of caves and nearby tunnels that were modified in 1939. In 1947, the hotel was converted into flats and renamed Granville House. For the next 30 years, the building was managed and then owned by William and Florence Hamilton. The Granville was a popular venue for ballroom dancing in the 1950s and 1960s, as William Hamilton had installed a sprung floor. This hall, demolished in 1982, was also used for counting votes during elections and to host private and civic functions. In February 1956, the basement became a jazz club called The Cave.

The building was designated as Grade II listed in 1973. From 1974 until the 1990s, it passed through a number of owners and financial backers.

A fire was ignited at the bottom of the staircase on the night of Thursday 25 April 1985. The flames were prevented from spreading by newly installed fire doors. The teak staircase was destroyed but was later restored in a £1.5 million restoration programme.

=== Public House & Banqueting Hall ===
The building includes a former public house named the Granville Bars, on the seafront corner. The bar closed around 1991 and is currently leased by Punch Taverns.

Adjoining the bar area is the banqueting hall, completed in October 1869 by Edward Pugin. The centre-piece of the hall is a massive fireplace inscribed with the motto "pile on the logs to make the fire great". The fireplace is still in situ and cost over £250 in 1869. The hall has a segmented ceiling, and the floorboards are laid with New Zealand pine. The banquet hall is listed on The Ramsgate Society's Buildings at Risk Register.

== Present day ==
The bomb-damaged west end of the building was rebuilt as apartments in 2004 by Oakleigh Developments Ltd and became Granville Court.

In 2010, the leaseholders of Granville House gained the Right To Manage and are now responsible for looking after the building themselves. On 18 December 2012, at a public auction, the freehold of Granville House was purchased by Mr Eliasz Englander for £156,000.

The Granville Cinema, opposite, is named after the building.

== See also ==
- Historic buildings in Ramsgate
