= Arthur Cornwallis Madan =

British linguist and Anglican missionary

- Born: 8 March 1846; Cam, Gloucestershire, England, UK
- Died: 1917 (aged 70–71); Oxford, United Kingdom

Academic background
- Education: Oxford University (BA, MA)

Academic work
- Discipline: Linguist
- Sub-discipline: African linguistics
- Notable works: Swahili–English dictionary; English–Swahili dictionary

Arthur Cornwallis Madan (1846–1917) was a British linguist and Anglican missionary who became famous for his research on African languages and his Swahili dictionaries.

== Family background and education ==
Madan was born on 8 March 1846 in the parish of Cam, Gloucestershire, England, as the third child of the Anglican pastor George Madan. He was educated at Marlborough College, and matriculated in 1865 at Christ Church, Oxford, graduating B.A. in 1869, M.A. in 1872.

Madan taught at Christ Church as a tutor from 1870 to 1880. He joined the Universities' Mission to Central Africa.

== Work in Africa ==
In 1880 he was sent to Zanzibar, where he learned Swahili and assisted bishop Edward Steere in his language research and translation work. When Steere died in August 1882, Madan finished Steere's manuscript of a Swahili grammar until the end of the year. ("A handbook of the Swahili language as spoken at Zanzibar, edited for the Universities' Mission to Central Africa").

Madan was considered the mission's chief linguist in East Africa. He continued to work on Swahili dictionaries. Initially this was a pioneer's work, as Ludwig Krapf's dictionary of Swahili, the first for this language, had not yet been published. In 1894 Madan's English-Swahili dictionary was published, followed by a Swahili-English dictionary in 1903.

1906 Madan moved to Northern Rhodesia (today: Zambia), where he continued researching a number of African languages like Lenje and Wisa. In 1911 he returned to Oxford, where he taught until his death in 1917.

== Legacy ==
He is remembered mostly for his dictionaries and other writings about the Swahili language. His dictionaries became the base for the Standard English-Swahili Dictionary and Standard Swahili-English Dictionary, which are known under the name of "Madan-Johnson".

== Writings ==
=== By A. C. Madan ===
- English-Swahili Dictionary, 1894, 1902² Clarendon Press online at archive.org
- Swahili-English dictionary, 1903 Oxford, Clarendon press online at archive.org
- Kiunangi or Story and History from Central Africa, Written by Boys in the Schools of the Universities Mission to Central Africa. Arthur Cornwallis Madan, G. Bell, London 1887, online here
- Muhammadi, maisha yake: pamoja na habari za Waslimu na Maturuki .., Soc. for Promoting Christian Knowledge, 1888 (in Swahili) online at google books
- Lala-Lamba Handbook: A Short Introduction to the South-western Division of the Wisa-Lala dialect of Northern Rhodesis with stories and vocabulary, 1908 Clarendon press online at archive.org
- Wisa Handbook: A Short Introduction to the Wisa Dialect of North-East Rhodesia, 1906 Clarendon Press online at archive.org
- Lenje Handbook: A Short Introduction to the Lenje Dialect Spoken in North-west Rhodesia, 1908 Clarendon press online at archive.org
- Senga Handbook: A Short Introduction to the Senga Dialect as Spoken on the Lower Luangwa, 1905 Clarendon press online at archive.org
- An outline dictionary intended as an aid in the study of the languages of the Bantu (African) and other uncivilized races, 1905 London : H. Frowde online at archive.org
- Living speech in Central and South Africa; an essay introductory to the Bantu family of languages, 1911, Oxford : Clarendon Press online at archive.org

=== Coauthored with others ===
- A handbook of the Swahili language, as spoken at Zanzibar, by Steere, Edward, 1828–1882; Madan, A. C. (Arthur Cornwallis), b. 1846, ed, 1884 London, Society for Promoting Christian Knowledge online at archive.org
- A Grammar of the Bemba Language as Spoken in North-east Rhodesia, by Schoeffer, J. H. West Sheane, Arthur Cornwallis Madan, 1907 Clarendon press online at archive.org
