= Matthew Hodgson =

Matthew Hodgson or Matt Hodgson may refer to:

- Matt Hodgson (born 1981), Australian professional rugby union player
- Matthew Hodgson (writer) (born 1982), American television writer and producer
- Matt Hodgson (basketball) (born 1991), Australian professional basketball player
