= Thomas Hodgson =

Thomas Hodgson may refer to:

- Tom Hodgson (1924–2006), Canadian sprint canoer and artist
- Thomas Hodgson (priest) (1854–1921), priest of the Church of England
- Thomas M. Hodgson, American law enforcement agent and politician
- Thomas Vere Hodgson (1864–1926), British polar explorer and marine biologist
- Thomas E. Hodgson, English musician and ethnomusicologist
