= John H. Hodgson =

American political scientist

John H. Hodgson is a political scientist. He was Professor of Political Science at Syracuse University in New York. He is one of the Western world's specialists on Russian communism, especially the Nordic sector. His Communism in Finland is a standard work on Nordic political history. He has also written a biography of Otto Ville Kuusinen.

== Selected works ==
- Communism in Finland: a history and interpretation. Princeton, N.J.: Princeton University Press. 1967.
- Edvard Gylling ja Otto W. Kuusinen asiakirjojan valossa, 1918-1920 [Edvard Gylling and Otto W. Kuusinen: discovered documents] (in Finnish). Helsinki: Kustannusosakeyhtiö Tammi. 1974.
- Otto Wille Kuusinen: poliittinen elämäkerta [Otto Wille Kuusinen: political biography] (in Finnish). Helsinki: Kustannusyhtiö Tammi. 1974. ISBN 978-951-30-3178-7.
- Escape to Russia (1974)
