= David Hodgson =

David Hodgson may refer to:

- David Hodgson (rugby league) (born 1981), English rugby league footballer
- David Hodgson (judge) (1939–2012), Australian judge
- David Hodgson (chemist), English chemistry professor
- David Hodgson (footballer) (born 1960), English football player
- David Hodgson (artist) (1798–1864), English painter
- Dave Hodgson (born 1959), English mayor of Bedford
- David Hodgson, convicted murderer, see murder of Jenny Nicholl
