= Richard Hodgson (disambiguation) =

Richard Hodgson (born 1979) is an English footballer.

Richard Hodgson may also refer to:

- Richard Hodgson (publisher) (1804–1872), publisher and amateur astronomer
- Rick Hodgson (born 1956), ice hockey player
- Richard Hodgson (parapsychologist) (1855–1905), Australian-born psychical researcher
- Richard Hodgson (cricketer) (1845–1931), English cricketer
- Richard Hodgson (MP) (1812–1877), British Member of Parliament for Berwick-upon-Tweed and Chairman of the North British Railway
- Richard Hodgson (water polo) (born 1892), British water polo player
