= Peter Hodgson =

Peter Hodgson may refer to:

- Peter E. Hodgson (1928–2008), British physicist
- Pete Hodgson (born 1950), New Zealand politician
- Peter Hodgson, bass player for Jon and Lee & the Checkmates and Rhinoceros
- Sneezy Waters (Peter Hodgson, born 1945), Canadian singer
- Peter C. Hodgson (born 1934), American theologian
