= Edward Hodgson (painter) =

Irish painter (1719–1794)

- Born: 1719
- Died: 1794 (aged 74–75); London
- Occupation: Flower-painter

Edward Hodgson (1719–1794) was an Irish flower-painter.

== Biography ==
Hodgson was a native of Dublin, practised with success in London. He exhibited annually at the Free Society of Artists from 1763 to 1783. In 1767, he is described as a drawing-master in Oxenden Street, Haymarket. In 1781, 1782, and 1788 he exhibited at the Royal Academy. His contributions were chiefly flower-pieces, but occasionally drawings of an academical kind. Hodgson was treasurer to the Associated Artists of Great Britain. He died in Great Newport Street, London, in 1794, aged 75. His daughter also exhibited flower-pieces at the Free Society of Artists from 1770 to 1775.
