= Frederick Hodgson =

Frederick Hodgson may refer to:

- Frederick Mitchell Hodgson (1851–1928), British colonial administrator
- Frederick Hodgson (politician) (1795–1854), English politician

== See also ==
- Fred Hodgson (disambiguation)
