= Hodgson Lake (Renville County, Minnesota) =

Lake in the state of Minnesota, United States

- Location within Minnesota
- Location: Renville County, Minnesota
- Coordinates: 44°50′37″N 94°34′41″W
- Type: lake

Hodgson Lake is a lake in Renville County, in the U.S. state of Minnesota.

Hodgson Lake bears the name of a pioneer settler.

== See also ==
- List of lakes in Minnesota
