= Gordon Hodson =

Canadian psychologist

- Education: University of Western Ontario
- Known for: Work on prejudice and political ideology
- Awards: Brock University Chancellor’s Chair for Research Excellence (2015–18)
- Scientific career
- Fields: Social psychology
- Institutions: Brock University
- Thesis: Uncertainty in the group context: categorization effects on persuasive message processing and ingroup favouritism (1999)
- Doctoral advisor: Richard Sorrentino

Gordon Hodson is a psychology professor at Brock University, where he directs the Brock Lab of Intergroup Processes. He is known for his research on political ideology and its relationship to prejudice, intelligence, and climate change denial.
