= Hodson, Nova Scotia =

Community in Nova Scotia, Canada

Coordinates: 45°43′53.72″N 62°57′48.15″W

Hodson in Nova Scotia

Hodson is a community in the Canadian province of Nova Scotia, located in Pictou County.
