= Tom Hodson =

English rugby league and rugby union player

Personal information
- Born: 27 September 1990 (age 35)

Playing information

Rugby league
- Position: Wing
Club
| Years | Team | Pld | T | G | FG | P |
|---|---|---|---|---|---|---|
| ≤2012–12 | Doncaster | ≥1 |
| 2013 | Featherstone Rovers | 12 | 9 | 0 | 0 | 36 |
| 2015 | Doncaster |
| | Total | | 9 | 0 | 0 | 36 |

Rugby union
- Position: Wing
Club
| Years | Team | Pld | T | G | FG | P |
|---|---|---|---|---|---|---|
| 2015 | Huddersfield R.U.F.C. |
| 2016 | Otley R.U.F.C. |
| | Total | 0 | 0 | 0 | 0 | 0 |

Tom Hodson (27 September 1990) is a professional rugby league and rugby union footballer who played in the 2010s. He has played club level rugby league (RL) for Doncaster, and Featherstone Rovers, as a wing, and club level rugby union (RU) for Huddersfield R.U.F.C., and Otley R.U.F.C., as a Fullback.

== Club career ==
Tom Hodson made his début for Featherstone Rovers on Sunday 3 February 2013.
