= John Barnet Hodgson =

British businessman (1819–1908)

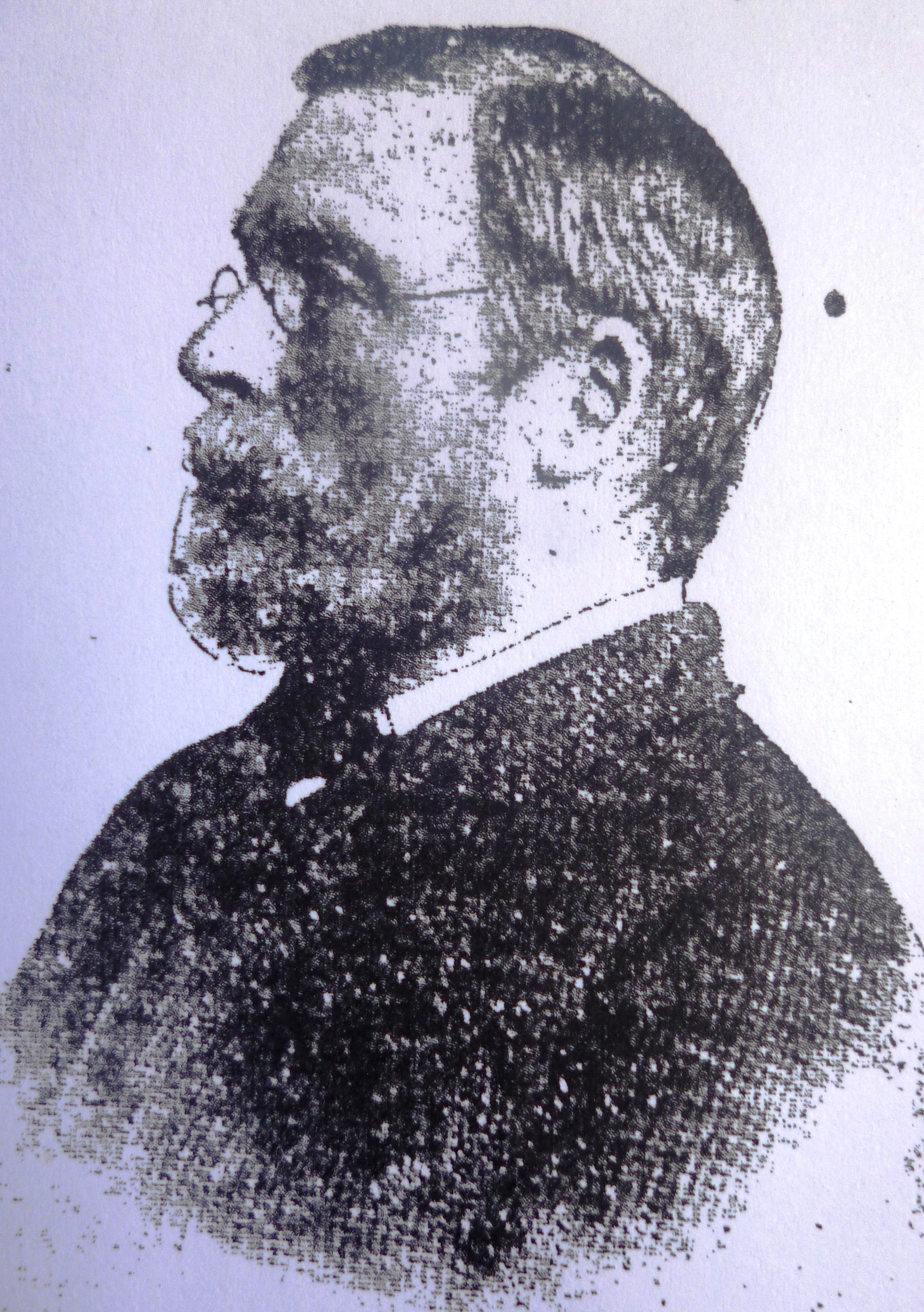
- An engraving of John Barnet Hodgson that appeared in the East Kent Times
- Born: 24 October 1819; Georgia, United States
- Died: 4 January 1908 (aged 88)
- Occupation: Businessman

John Barnet Hodgson was a Ramsgate Mayor, businessman and long serving Ramsgate postmaster.

He was born on 24 October 1819 in Georgia, United States. He moved to England as a child in 1821. In July 1845 he was appointed postmaster of Ramsgate, a position he held for 46 years, before retiring on 31 December 1891. He was a business partner of Edward Welby Pugin and contractor for The Granville Hotel, Ramsgate.

He was mayor of Ramsgate between 1898 and 1899. He died at his home at 30 Augusta Road, Ramsgate on 24 January 1908. He was interred in the family vault in St. George's churchyard, Ramsgate.
