= Hodgson, Texas =

Ghost town in Texas, US

Hodgson
- Ghost town
- Location in Texas
- Coordinates: 33.4720586°N 94.6860429°W
- Country: United States
- State: Texas
- County: Bowie
- Settled: c. 1836
- Named after: John J. Hodgson
- Elevation: 413 ft (126 m)
- USGS Feature ID: 1359333
- Census Code: 34388
- Class Code: U6

Hodgson is a ghost town in Bowie County, Texas, United States.

== History ==
Hodgson was first settled by loggers and farmers c. 1836, and emerged following the American Civil War. A post office operated from 1893 to 1904, and its first postmaster, John J. Hodgson, was the namesake of Hodgson. By the 1940s, the town had a population of 35.
