= Geoffrey Hodgson (cricketer) =

English cricketer (born 1938)

Geoffrey Hodgson (24 July 1938, Lepton, Huddersfield, Yorkshire, England) is an English first-class cricketer. A specialist wicket-keeper, he played two first-class matches. Unusually one was for Yorkshire County Cricket Club in 1964 (against Oxford University), and the other for their rivals, Lancashire, a year later against Kent. He took three catches, completed two stumpings and, batting right-handed, scored five runs at an average of 2.50 in those games.

He also played for the Yorkshire Second XI from 1958 to 1964, Lancashire Second XI in 1965, the International Cavaliers in 1965 and the Bradford League in 1967.
