= John Hodgson (footballer, born 1922) =

English footballer

Personal information
- Date of birth: 10 May 1922
- Place of birth: Dawdon, England
- Date of death: 1973 (aged 50–51)
- Position: Goalkeeper

Senior career*
Years	Team	Apps	(Gls)
1946–1948	Leeds United	20	(0)
1948–1955	Middlesbrough	13	(0)
- * Club domestic league appearances and goals

John Hodgson (10 May 1922 – 1973) was an English footballer who played in the Football League for Leeds United and Middlesbrough.
