= Andrew Hodgson (novelist) =

British writer

Andrew Robert Hodgson
- Born: 1988 (age 37–38); Kingston upon Hull, East Riding of Yorkshire
- Education: Université Paris XII, University of London
- Occupation: Writer
- Writing career
- Language: English
- Genres: Fiction, Criticism
- Website: andrewhodgson.fr

Andrew Hodgson is a British writer, researcher and artist based in Paris. He is the author of two novels, Reperfusion (2012) and Mnemic Symbols (2019). He also translated Roland Topor's Head-to-Toe Portrait of Suzanne (2018).

== Biography ==
Hodgson was born in Kingston upon Hull and comes from a working class background in the east of the city. He began writing novels at a young age. Hodgson was awarded a Doctorat in 2016 for the study of experimental literature Aberrant Experiments: Reading Society in the Novel Experiments of Britain and France, 1945-1975. In the past, he has worked as a Contributing Editor at 3:AM Magazine. As of 2023, he teaches at the École des hautes études en sciences sociales, Paris.

== Books ==
Hodgson's first novel Reperfusion was released in November 2012. Hodgson has stated that with this book he was "trying to ask what it was that the book becomes when it is being read." His translation of the Roland Topor novel, Head-to-Toe Portrait of Suzanne was supported as part of the Burgess Programme of the Institut français du Royaume-Uni, and appeared with Atlas Press in 2018. His second novel Mnemic Symbols was published by Dostoyevsky Wannabe in 2019. The London Magazine states that through an "almost perfect modelling of quotidian consciousness," the book exposes "some of the more poetic, yet surreal, human thought patterns and ways of dealing with death and mourning." In 2020, Hodgson installed the contents of the group book object Praxis as a room at Haus Wien Art Fair, Vienna.

== Bibliography ==
=== Novels ===
- Reperfusion (2012), WPS&B
- Mnemic Symbols (2019), Dostoyevsky Wannabe

=== Critical Studies ===
- The Post-War Experimental Novel (2019), Bloomsbury

=== Art Books ===
- Paris (ed.) (2019), Dostoyevsky Wannabe

With: Craig Dworkin, Lauren Elkin, Gaia Di Lorenzo, Olivier Salon & Chris Clarke, Yelena Moskovich, Camille Bloomfield, Stewart Home, Amalie Brandt, Ian Monk, Andrew Gallix, Eric Giraudet De Boudemange, Andrew Hodgson, Philipp Timischl.

- Praxis (ed.) (2021), Dostoyevsky Wannabe

With: Emily Critchley, Imogen Reid, Derek Beaulieu, Andrew Hodgson, Sawako Nakayasu, Outranspo, Bhanu Kapil, Guy Bennett, Spencer Thomas Campbell, Joanna Walsh, Jake Kennedy, Vanessa Onwuemezi, Eley Williams, Kevin McPherson Eckhoff, Isabel Waidner, Shola von Reinhold, Robert Kiely, Chris Clarke, Shane Jesse Christmass, Kimberly Campanello, Rosie Šnajdr, and Roy Claire Potter.

- A I S T I T – coming to our senses (ed.) (2021), Garret Publications
- New Forms of Art and Contagious Mental Illness (2023), New Documents

=== Translations ===
- Roland Topor, Head-to-Toe Portrait of Suzanne (2018), Atlas Press
- Pierre MacOrlan, Raymond Queneau, François Caradec, LIP Journal 22 (2021), Atlas Press
