= Hotson =

- Language: English

Hotson is an English and Scottish surname.

Notable people with the surname include:

- Howard Hotson, British historian
- J Leslie Hotson (1897–1992), Shakespearean scholar
- John Ernest Buttery Hotson (1877–1944), Governor of Bombay
- John William Hotson (1869–1957), American botanist
