= Edmund Francis Davis =

English solicitor and businessman

Edmund Francis Davis (April 1845 – 5 September 1889) was a British American solicitor and a businessman who once owned the Westgate Estate, in Kent, and the Granville Hotel, Ramsgate.

== Biography ==
He was born in April 1845, in Chiswick, to Eliza and James Davis. He was educated at University College London.

Davis married Florence Aria on 11 June 1867. They had four children – Edward J Davis, Herbert Francis Davis, Sydney Ethelbert F Davis, and Eulalie Florence F Davis.

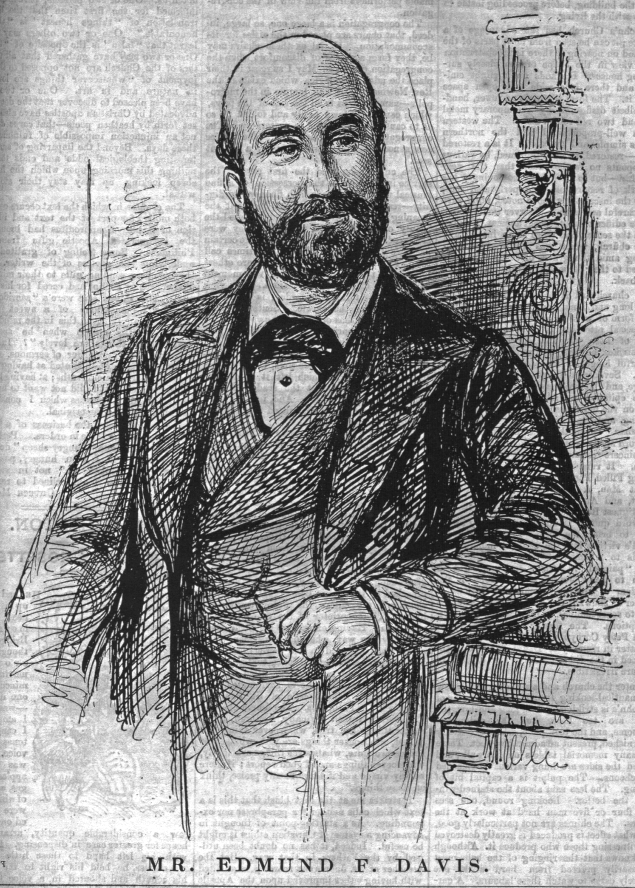
Edmund Davis, Thanet Figaro, 7 July 1877.

In 1877, Davis purchased the Granville Hotel, Ramsgate from Coutts. The estate had formerly belonged to Edward Welby Pugin who was declared bankrupt in 1872. Davis later unveiled a marble bust in memory of E.W Pugin in 1879.

In 1877, Davis constructed the Granville Marina. This was a parade of shops below the cliff connected to the hotel by a tunnel. He inaugurated the "Granville Express" – a train service from London that halted at Westgate on sea and Ramsgate. On the promenade in front of the Granville, he laid out the Victoria Gardens. A Gothic kiosk that once collected an admission fee still exists.

Davis was a very charismatic figure, who has been given undue credit for the growth of Westgate on Sea, as he was proprietor of the Estate for only two years. He purchased the Westgate Estate from London developers, Corbett and McClymont, on 1 May 1878. In order to purchase it, he obtained a mortgage for £80,000 from Coutts with a further loan of £15,000 for the Westgate and Birchington Gas and Water Works. As proprietor of the Estate, he became the owner of the sea walls, the promenades and roads (all roads in Westgate were private, except for the Margate to Canterbury highway) and the Beach House Hotel, as well as all uncovered building land.

In December 1878 he put on an experiment in lighting part of the sea front at Westgate with electricity, bringing down visitors from London by special trains and then entertaining them extravagantly. The experiment proved to be very expensive and was abandoned after a month.

Amongst his achievements were the laying out of the pleasure gardens on the cliff tops and the building of the Baths and Assembly Rooms, opened at St Mildred's Bay in January 1880. However, he was greatly stretched financially (he still had mortgages relating to the Albion and Granville Estates in Ramsgate) and by January 1880 was struggling to pay even the interest owing.

1879 was not a good year. The Westgate and Birchington Gas Bill was thrown out in March, he was being chased by the Medical Officer of Health about Westgate's drainage with threats that he might, as a private road owner, be compelled to link up the sewers with the main public sewer (very expensive) and the Isle of Thanet Gas Company took out an injunction against him to prevent him damaging their gas pipes in the Canterbury Road.

He stood unsuccessfully in the 1880 and 1885 General Elections as a Liberal candidate for the Isle of Thanet constituency.

In November 1886, he was sued by a trader for an unpaid bill at the Empire Club, London, where Davis served as a committee member. It was reported that the other members "turned their backs on him", leaving him to face thousands of pounds of liabilities. On 10 December 1886, he fled the country to live in Chicago, Illinois, United States. On 22 October 1887, his wife Florence died. His time in America was short lived. Davis died on 5 September 1889, and it was reported that he had died in South America from cholera. He is interred at Oak Woods Cemetery, Chicago.
