= Alexander Carlton Hodson =

American entomologist (1906–1996)

- Born: June 17, 1906; Reading, Massachusetts, U.S.
- Died: March 13, 1996 (aged 89)
- Education: University of Massachusetts Amherst (BS); University of Minnesota (MA, PhD)
- Occupation: Entomologist
- Scientific career
- Fields: Entomology

Alexander Carlton Hodson (June 17, 1906 – March 13, 1996) was an American entomologist and a professor at the University of Minnesota. He is known for his work on ecological approaches to applied entomology.

Hodson was born in Reading, Massachusetts, where his father worked in a paint business into which he too joined. He then received a BS from the University of Massachusetts in 1928 and an MA in 1931 from the University of Minnesota, followed by a PhD in 1935. He worked under Victor E. Shelford at the Puget Sound Biological Station and became influenced in ecological entomology. Along with his student Huai C. Chiang, he also developed laboratory techniques such as for the rearing of Drosophila. As a hobby, Hodson also maintained notes over a 51-year period on the first leafing and flowering of trees in the university campus.

Hodson became a professor at the University of Minnesota where he served until his retirement in 1974. His work was on economic entomology. A lecture series named after him was begun in 1975 as also a Hodson Hall at the university.
