= George Hodgson (cricketer) =

English cricketer

Personal information
- Full name: George Harris Hodgson
- Born: 4 May 1839; Thanet, Kent, England
- Died: 15 April 1917 (aged 77); Hythe, Kent, England
- Batting: Unknown
- Bowling: Unknown arm roundarm fast

Career statistics
Competition	First-class
Matches	4
Runs scored	74
Batting average	18.50
100s/50s	–/–
Top score	32
Balls bowled	68
Wickets	2
Bowling average	11.00
5 wickets in innings	–
10 wickets in match	–
Best bowling	1/0
Catches/stumpings	1/–
- Source: Cricinfo, 2 August 2020

George Harris Hodgson (4 May 1839 – 15 April 1917) was an English first-class cricketer.

The son of John George Hodgson, he was born at Thanet in May 1839. He was educated at Harrow School, before going up to Trinity College, Oxford. A keen cricketer, Hodgson did not feature in first-class cricket for Oxford University Cricket Club, but did make four first-class appearances for the Gentlemen of Kent from 1858 to 1861. He scored 74 runs in his four matches at an average of 18.50, with a high score of 32. With his roundarm fast bowling he took 2 wickets.

Hodgson graduated from Oxford in 1866 with a master's degree. He later served as secretary to the Clergy Mutual Assurance Society. Hodgson died at Hythe in April 1917.
