= Fred W. Hodgson =

American architect

Frederick W. Hodgson (1886 -1930), known as Fred W. Hodgson, was an American architect based in Logan, Utah.

He was born March 19, 1886, in Salt Lake City, Utah

He died February 16, 1930.

Relationship to Leslie S. Hodgson (1879-1947) / Hodgson & McClenahan ?

He worked as a draftsman for Smith & Hodgson in Ogden during 1908–1909.

At least one of his works is listed on the National Register of Historic Places.

Works include:

- Ray B. West Building (1918), Utah State University campus, Logan, Utah
- Smithfield Public Library (1921), Smithfield, Utah, NRHP-listed
- First Presbyterian Church (1924), Logan

The collected architectural drawings of Fred W. Hodgson are held by the Utah State University's Merrill-Cazier Library in Logan, Utah. These are mostly of works in Cache County and Box Elder County.
