= Paul Hodgson =

Paul Hodgson may refer to:

- Paul Hodgson (rugby union) (born 1982), English rugby union player and coach
- Paul Hodgson (baseball) (born 1960), Canadian-born Major League Baseball outfielder
- Paul Hodgson (Australian footballer) (born 1944), Australian rules footballer
- Paul A. Hodgson (1891–1955), United States Army officer
