= William Hodgson =

William Hodgson may refer to:

- William Hodgson (Master of Peterhouse, Cambridge) (died 1847), British academic
- William Hodgson (Australian politician) (1814–1891), Tasmanian politician
- William Hodgson (Canadian politician) (1912–1988)
- William Ballantyne Hodgson (1815–1880), Scottish educational reformer and political economist
- William Hope Hodgson (1877–1918), English fantasy author
- William Nicholson Hodgson, British Member of the UK Parliament for Carlisle
- W. N. Hodgson (William Noel Hodgson, 1893–1916), English war poet
- Billy Hodgson (born 1935), Scottish footballer
- William R. Hodgson (died 1998), Canadian hotel magnate and Toronto Argonauts owner
- William Roy Hodgson (1892–1958), Australian public servant and diplomat
- Bill Hodgson (curler) (1944–2022), Canadian curler
