= Derek Hodgson =

Derek Hodgson may refer to:

- Derek Hodgson (priest) (1931–2007), Anglican priest
- Derek Hodgson (trade unionist) (born 1941), Welsh trade union leader
- Derek Hodgson (judge), British barrister and judge
