= Joe Hodgson =

English footballer

Personal information
- Full name: Joseph Hodgson
- Place of birth: South Moor, County Durham, England
- Height: 5 ft 8 in (1.73 m)
- Position: Left half

Senior career*
Years	Team	Apps	(Gls)
- Easington Colliery
1933–1939	Darlington	163 (Note: Figure includes three appearances in the abandoned 1939–40 Football League season, which Joyce includes in his totals although many statistical sources do not.)	(2)
- * Club domestic league appearances and goals

Joseph Hodgson (fl. 1933–1939) was an English footballer who made 183 appearances in the Football League playing as a left half for Darlington in the 1930s. He joined Darlington from Easington Colliery.
