= Henry Hodgson =

Henry Hodgson may refer to:

- Henry Hodgson (bishop) (1856–1921), Bishop of St Edmundsbury and Ipswich in the Church of England
- Henry Hodgson (British Army officer) (1868–1930), British Army general
- Henry Oswald Hodgson (1886–1975), English organist and composer
