= Bible translations into the languages of Africa =

The Bible, or portions of it, have been translated into over 1,000 languages of Africa.

== Bemba/Cibemba (Zambia) ==
Part of the Bible in Bemba language was first published in 1904, followed by the New Testament in 1916, and the entire Bible in 1956. Currently a revision is in progress. Paul Mushindo and the Scottish missionary Robert McMinn worked together on Bible translation into the Bemba language for more than twenty years.

== Old Testament Chichewa (Malawi) ==
The Chichewa, in Zambia still called the more neutral Chinyanja, Bible was translated by William Percival Johnson in 1912. This older version is bound as Buku Lopatulika. The Bible Society of Malawi records that the Buku Lopatulika translation was first published in 1922, revised in 1936 and 1966. A Jubilee edition was produced to commemorate Malawi's 50 years of independence. The new Buku Loyera version is a contemporary Chichewa dynamic equivalent translation first published in 1998.

== Chope, Tshopi (Mozambique) ==
Dinis Sengulane, an Anglican of the Mozambican Diocese of Lebombo, translated into Tshopi.

== Ciyawo (Malawi) ==
Malangano Ga Sambano is the New Testament in the Ciyawo language (Chiyao, Chiyawo). It is published by the Bible Society of Malawi (2011).

== Gwari (Gbagyi-Gbari) ==
A Gbagyi (Eastern Gwari) translation of the New Testament, Alkawali Wo’iwohi, was published in 1956. A new translation, Alkawali Woiwoyi, was published in 1997.

== Hausa ==
The first translations of Biblical texts into Hausa were published during the 1850s and were done by James Schön with the help of Hausa speakers who had been freed from slavery due to the Act Prohibiting Importation of Slaves and the blockade of Africa that followed. The first complete translation of the Bible (without the deuterocanonical books) was published in 1932 by the Bible Society of Nigeria and was mostly the work of Walter Miller during his stay in Zaria with the help of local informants. The first Bible with deuterocanonical books was published in 1979 by the Bible Society of Nigeria. The Bible Society of Nigeria published a revised translation in 2014. Another translation called Sabon Rai Don Kowa was published in 2020. The same year, the first complete Bible in Hausa ajami script was published (Biblical texts had been published before, the first ones during the last years of the 19th century).

== Igbo (Nigeria) ==
British Anglican Thomas John Dennis translated the Bible into a "standard" "Union Igbo" by 1913. This version was very influential but criticised by artists, among them Chinua Achebe, as stultifying the Igbo language. The Igbo Living Bible was published in 1988.

== Ikizu / Sizaki (Tanzania) ==
In the summer of 2025, the New Testament of the Ikizu / Sizaki language was dedicated. The translation work had taken place over 19 years.

== Isoko (Nigeria) ==
The translation of the Holy Bible into Isoko took place in different phases and by different people. It started in 1920 when one Mr Omuye and Wilson Oki under the supervision of British missionaries, Rev. Henry Protor and J. C. Aitken translated St Mark's gospel into Isoko. Between 1921 and 1922, the brilliant and indefatigable John-Mark Israel Eloho, who was a catechist at Uzere, translated the other Gospels and the Acts of the Apostles into Isoko. He later embarked on the translation of some other books of the New Testament into Isoko. Other people were also involved at different times in the translation of the Bible into Isoko till the entire Bible was translated. At the end of the day, the complete Isoko Bible (Ebaibol Eri Na) was published in 1977 as a publication of the England-based United Bible Societies for and on behalf of the Bible Society of Nigeria.

== Khoekhoegowab/Damara/Nama (Namibia) ==
Johann Heinrich Schmelen translated into the Khoekhoe language (formerly "Hottentot") of the Nama people of Namibia.

== Ki-Kamba (Kenya) ==
Johann Ludwig Krapf, a German, translated parts of the New Testament into Kamba language.

== Kituba/Kikongo ya Leta (Democratic Republic of Congo) ==
- 1934: First portions were published.
- 1950: New Testament and Psalms published, called 'Luwawana yampa ye Bankunga' by Bible Society of Congo
- 1982: Entire Bible published, called 'La Bible en Kituba (Kikongo ya Leta), Kuwakana ya Ntama ti Kuwakana ya Mpa'.

== Konso (Sierra Leone) ==
The New Testament was published in 2008 by the Bible Society in Sierra Leone. The translation of the Old Testament is in progress.

== Luganda (Uganda) ==
- 1893: A complete New Testament was available in one volume. Then the Old Testament books of Exodus and Joshua were translated by Pilkington and published by BFBS
- 1894: Publishing of the Books of Genesis, Psalms and Daniel by BFBS but translated by Pilkington.
- 1895: A new edition of the New Testament with corrections made by Pilkington is printed.
- Early 1896:Books of the Pentateuch are translated by Pilkington and published
- Mid-1896: Minor prophets are translated by Crabtree
- Late 1896: The entire Old Testament is published.
- 1899: A revised edition of the 1896 Luganda Bible is published by BFBS in London. The revision committee consisted of H.W Duta Kitakule, Ham Mukasa, Natanieli Mudeka, Tomasi Senfuma and Bartolomayo Musoke. The team was assisted by Jane E. Chadwick, a CMS missionary.
- 1968: A newer edition of the 1899 Luganda Bible is published with a revised orthography prepared by Christopher MS Kisosonkole. It was published by the Bible Society in East Africa.
- 1974: A Joint Translation Committee composed of the Anglican Church of Uganda, Roman Catholic Church, the Orthodox Church and the Seventh Day Adventist Church is set up and tasked with the publishing of an ecumenical version of the Gospel according to Mark.
- 1975: The Gospels of Matthew, Luke and John are published.
- 1977: The Book of Ephesians is published
- 1979: The first Joint Ecumenical Luganda New Testament is published by the Bible Society of Uganda. Bible Society of Uganda was established in 1968 although the work of translation had been started earlier by the British Foreign Bible Societies.
- 1984: The first revised Contemporary Luganda New Testament is translated by two people: Rev Yafesi K. Mwanje and Mr E. K. K. Sempebwa. It is published by Living Bibles International and is widely accepted as an easy-to-read version by people from all walks of life.
- 2001: A complete version of the Joint Ecumenical Luganda Bible is published by the Bible Society of Uganda. However, it faces a lot of resistance because of the change in nomenclature of the Bible books, as well as the inclusion of the Apocrypha. Even though the Apocrypha is accepted by the Roman Catholic Church, it is not considered Canonical especially in the wider Anglican Church, Pentecostal Church or Seventh Day Adventist Church.
- 2014: The First Revised Contemporary Luganda Bible (both Old Testament and New Testament) is published by Biblica Africa. It includes a concordance and names index. The team tasked to translate the work consisted of Omukulu. E. K. K. Sempebwa, Rev. Can. Yafesi K Mwanje, Rtd Bishop Dunstan Bukenya, Mr. Solomon Mpalanyi, Ven. Can. Nelson Kaweesa, Rev. Isaac Mukisa and Dr. Amos Mwesigwa Kasule.

== Malagasy (Madagascar) ==
The Bible was translated into the Malagasy language by David Jones (missionary) and David Griffiths, with the New Testament appearing in 1830.

== Mijikenda/Nyika ==
Johann Ludwig Krapf translated into Mijikenda languages.

== Oromo (Ethiopia) ==
Oromo is one of the many languages of Ethiopia. The New Testament was published in 1893, the complete Bible in 1899, the work of Aster Ganno and Onesimos Nesib. A new translation of the entire Bible was published by the Ethiopian Bible Society in 1992.

- Johann Ludwig Krapf – Anglican, parts into Oromo, Amharic, Nyika (Rabai) and Kamba.

== Oshindonga (Namibia) ==
Martti Rautanen – Finnish Missionary Society, into Oshindonga dialect of the Ovambo language of Namibia.

== Otjiherero (Namibia) ==
Gottlieb Viehe – German, into Otjiherero language of Namibia.

== Setswana (Botswana, South Africa) ==
Robert Moffat – Congregationalist, translated into Setswana language in 1842.

== Shiyeyi (Botswana, Namibia) ==
The Wayeyi Bible Translation Project—a project of the Bible Society of Botswana—has been working on a translation of the New Testament into Shiyeyi since 2013. Ni Totuzane Sha Mayi Nganii (Comfort One Another With These Words), a selection of Scripture verses from the New Testament was published in 2017.

== Somali ==
The Bible was translated into Somali under the supervision of Rev. H. Warren Modricker and his wife Dorothy Dixon Modricker. The Somali Bible is published by Nolosha Cusub with the title Kitaabka Quduuska Ah and is available digitally as well as in print. The copyright (1979, 2008) belongs to SIM International.

== Sotho (South Africa) ==
Samuel Rolland (1801–1873), first missionary of the Paris Missionary Society, translated some parts of the New Testament and several hymns into Sotho language in the 1840s. Today there are Northern Sotho and Southern Sotho versions.

== Swahili (Kenya, Tanzania) ==
The first translation of parts of the Bible into Swahili was accomplished by 1868, with a complete New Testament translation following in 1879 and a translation of the whole Bible in 1890. Since that time, there have been several translations into different dialects of Swahili as spoken in different regions of East Africa; these include the Union Translation published by the Bible Society of Tanzania in 1950 and the Swahili Common Language version.

Translation	John (Yohana) 3:16
Union Translation	Kwa maana jinsi hii Mungu aliupenda ulimwengu, hata akamtoa Mwanawe pekee, ili kila mtu amwaminiye asipotee, bali awe na uzima wa milele.
Biblica, 1989	Kwa maana jinsi hii Mungu aliupenda ulimwengu hata akamtoa Mwanawe wa pekee, ili kila mtu amwaminiye asipotee, bali awe na uzima wa milele.

== Xhosa (South Africa) ==
Henry Hare Dugmore, a Methodist, translated into Xhosa language. Tiyo Soga (1829–1871) was ordained the first African Presbyterian minister in 1856 and also translated.

Translation	John (uYohane) 3:16
Bible Society of South Africa (1975)	Kuba wenjenje uThixo ukulithanda kwakhe ihlabathi, ude wancama uNyana wakhe okuphela kwamzeleyo, ukuze bonke abakholwayo kuye bangatshabalali, koko babe nobomi obungunaphakade.

== Yao (Malawi) ==
Ndandililo ni Kutyoka is a translation of the books of Genesis and Exodus from the Old Testament into the Yao language published by The Bible Society of Malawi, Blantyre, Malawi, 2004.

== Yoruba (Nigeria) ==
Samuel Ajayi Crowther translated the Bible into Yoruba language and concluded it in the mid-1880s known as "Bibeli Mimo". The complete Yoruba Bible was first published in 1884. In addition to this, several translations have been released by different authors. These include Iroyin Ayo, Iwe Mimo ni Itumo Aye Tuntun, Bíbélì Mímó ti Ìtúmò Ayé Tuntun, etc.

Translation	John (Johannu) 3:16
BFBS, 1900	Nitori O̩lo̩run fe̩ araiye tobẽ̩ ge̩, ti o fi O̩mo̩ bíbi rè̩ kans̩os̩o funni, pe e̩nike̩ni ti o ba gbà a gbó̩ kì yio s̩egbé, s̩ugbo̩n yio ni ìye ti kò nipe̩kun.
NWT-YR, 2018	"Torí Ọlọ́run nífẹ̀ẹ́ ayé gan-an débi pé ó fi Ọmọ bíbí rẹ̀ kan ṣoṣo fúnni, kí gbogbo ẹni tó bá ń ní ìgbàgbọ́ nínú rẹ̀ má bàa pa run, ṣùgbọ́n kó lè ní ìyè àìnípẹ̀kun.

== Zulu (South Africa) ==
In 1837, the first portions of the Bible in the Zulu language were published; in the "First Book for Readers," portions of Genesis and two Psalms were published. The first book of the Bible to be translated into the Zulu language was Matthew's Gospel, published in 1848 by the American Board of Commissioners for Foreign Missions (ABCFM). This was translated by George Champion (missionary) and revised by Newton Adams. The completed New Testament was published in 1865, translated by several missionaries of the ABCFM. The complete Bible, also translated by many members of the ABCFM, corrected by Andrew Abraham, and finally edited by S. C. Pixley, was published in 1883. A 1917 revision by James Dexter Taylor was rejected by the churches for being a poor revision, full of errors in poor Zulu. It was reprinted by ABS in 1924 but not distributed. Therefore, a revision committee was established to do a proper acceptable revision of the 1893 Bible. The revision was published in 1959 and published in London by the British and Foreign Bible Society. It was further revised in 1997 to use modern orthography. A Modern Zulu New Testament and the Psalms was completed in 1986 and published in Cape Town by the Bible Society of South Africa. This was translated by Dean Nils Joëlson, and project co-ordinated by Mr. D. T. Maseko and Mr. K. Magubane. John William Colenso and Hans Paludan Smith Schreuder are also said to have worked on the Zulu Bible translation.

Translation	John 3:16
(American Bible Society, 1883)	Ngokuba uNkulunkulu walithanda ili-zwe kangaka, waze wanikela nge Ndodana yakhe izelwe iyinye, ukuba bonke abakholwa yiyo banga bhubi, kepha babe nokuphila okuphakade.
