= Christopher Hodgson =

Christopher Hodgson may refer to:

- Chris Hodgson (born 1962), Canadian politician
- Christopher Hodgson (priest) (1561– after 1596), Catholic priest who played a minor role in the Babington Plot
- Christopher Pemberton Hodgson (1821–1865), English colonial pastoralist, traveller and writer

== See also ==
- Christopher Hodson (disambiguation)
