= Telfair Hodgson =

American priest and academic (1840–1893)

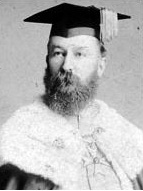
- Born: March 14, 1840; Columbia, Virginia, U.S.
- Died: September 11, 1893 (aged 53); Sewanee, Tennessee, U.S.
- Education: Princeton University; General Theological Seminary
- Occupations: Episcopal priest, academic administrator
- Spouse: Frances Glen Potter
- Children: 2 sons (including Telfair Hodgson Jr.), 1 daughter
- Relatives: Benjamin F. Cheatham (daughter-in-law's father)
- Military service
- Allegiance: Confederate States
- Service: Confederate States Army
- Service years: 1861–1865
- Rank: Chaplain
- Unit: 1st Alabama Cavalry Regiment
- Wars: American Civil War

Telfair Hodgson (March 14, 1840 – September 11, 1893) was an American Episcopal priest and academic administrator. He was the dean of the Theological Department at Sewanee: The University of the South from 1878 to 1893, and vice chancellor from 1879 to 1890. He was a co-founder and the managing editor of The Sewanee Review.

== Early life ==
Telfair Hodgson was born on March 14, 1840, in Columbia, Virginia. He attended Princeton University, where he joined the Kappa Alpha Society and graduated in 1859. He entered the General Theological Seminary in New York City.

== Career ==
At the outbreak of the American Civil War, Hodgson left seminary and enlisted as a private in the 44th Virginia Infantry of the Confederate States Army. He transferred to serve in the 1st Regiment Alabama Infantry, which was led by his brother, Colonel Joseph Hodgson. He was eventually promoted to the staff of General Joseph Wheeler. In 1863 he was ordained as an Episcopal deacon and then as a priest in 1864 in Macon, Georgia, where he served as a chaplain in a hospital. A few years after the war, Hodgson went to Europe, where he lived in 1869–1870.

Hogdson worked as a professor of philosophy at the University of Alabama from 1872 to 1873. He was the assistant rector of Christ's Church in Baltimore, Maryland, in 1874, and the rector of Trinity Church in Hoboken, New Jersey, in 1874–1878. Some of his sermons were about the Confederate fallen. In 1876 he gave Sewanee: The University of the South $10,000 to build a library; it was the first building in Sewanee to be constructed of stone.

Theological education had been a growing concern at Sewanee since it began admitting students in 1868, and shortly thereafter it merged with the Sewanee Training and Divinity School. It had no dean of theology until Hodgson was hired as dean in 1878. He served as dean until 1893, and also served as vice chancellor from 1879 to 1890. He supported the construction of Thompson Union and Convocation Hall.

When William Peterfield Trent founded The Sewanee Review in 1892, Hodgson became its financial backer and managing editor. He took care of the financial affairs of the journal so that Trent could concentrate on its literary content.

== Personal life, death and legacy ==
Hodgson married Frances Glen Potter, the daughter of a slave-owning planter from Savannah, Georgia. They had two sons, Telfair Hodgson Jr. and J. H. P. Hodgson, and a daughter.

Hodgson died on September 11, 1893, in Sewanee, Tennessee. His son Telfair Hodgson Jr. was the treasurer of the University of the South from 1908 to 1949.

The Sewanee Review is the oldest continuously published literary quarterly in the United States.
