= Telfair Hodgson Jr. =

American businessman

Telfair Hodgson
- Born: September 14, 1876
- Died: September 16, 1952 (aged 76); Sewanee, Tennessee, U.S.
- Education: Sewanee: The University of the South
- Occupations: Businessman, academic administrator
- Spouse: Medora Cheatham
- Children: 1 daughter
- Parent(s): Telfair Hodgson; Frances Potter

Telfair Hodgson Jr., also known as Telfair Hodgson, (September 14, 1876 – September 16, 1952) was an American businessman and academic administrator. He was the treasurer of Sewanee: The University of the South from 1908 to 1949. He was also the president of the Bank of Sewanee, and a developer of Belle Meade, Tennessee.

== Early life ==
Hodgson was born on September 14, 1876. His father, Telfair Hodgson, was an Episcopal priest who served as the third vice chancellor of Sewanee: The University of the South from 1879 to 1890. His mother, nee Frances Potter, was the daughter of a slave-owning planter from Savannah, Georgia.

Hodgson graduated from Sewanee: The University of the South in 1898. He was a member of the Phi Delta Theta fraternity.

== Career ==
Hodgson began his career at Brown Bros. & Co., an investment bank in New York City. He returned to Sewanee, where he was the president of the Bank of Sewanee.

Hodgson served as the treasurer of his alma mater, Sewanee: The University of the South from 1908 to 1949. He served on the board of directors of the Emerald-Hodgson Hospital in Sewanee, and he was the president of the Sewanee Civic Committee. He was a registrar of the Episcopal Diocese of Tennessee and senior warden of the Otey Memorial Parish Church in Sewanee.

With Luke Lea (the publisher of The Tennessean) and David Shepherd, Hodgson became the owner of the Belle Meade Land Company in 1910. The company developed the main streets of Belle Meade, Tennessee, including Jackson Boulevard and Belle Meade Boulevard.

== Personal life and death ==
Hodgson married Medora Cheatham, the daughter of Confederate Major-General Benjamin F. Cheatham and great-granddaughter of James Robertson. She served as the honorary president-general of the United Daughters of the Confederacy (UDC). They had a daughter, Alice, who married surgeon Edward Frost Parker (d. 1998), who was the son of Edward Frost Parker (d. 1938), the dean of the Medical College of South Carolina.

Hodgson died on September 16, 1952, in Sewanee, Tennessee, at 75, two days shy of his 76th birthday. He was buried in Sewanee.
