= Robert Hodgson (cricketer) =

Australian cricketer (born 1973)

Personal information
- Full name: Robert William Hodgson
- Born: 22 March 1973 (age 53); Launceston, Tasmania, Australia
- Batting: Right-handed
- Bowling: Right-arm fast-medium

Domestic team information
- Years: Team
- 1995/96–1998/99: Tasmania

Career statistics
Competition	FC	LA
Matches	3	2
Runs scored	5	–
Batting average	5.00	–
100s/50s	–/–	–/–
Top score	4	–
Balls bowled	582	102
Wickets	6	5
Bowling average	53.00	7.40
5 wickets in innings	–	–
10 wickets in match	–	–
Best bowling	2/44	4/21
Catches/stumpings	–/–	–/–
- Source: Cricinfo, 4 January 2011

Robert William Hodgson (born 22 February 1973, in Launceston, Tasmania), is a former Australian cricketer, who played for Tasmania. He attended the Australian Cricket Academy in 1996, but due to injury hasn't played for Tasmania since 1999.

== See also ==
- List of Tasmanian representative cricketers
