= Robert Hodgson (diplomat) =

British diplomat (1874–1956)

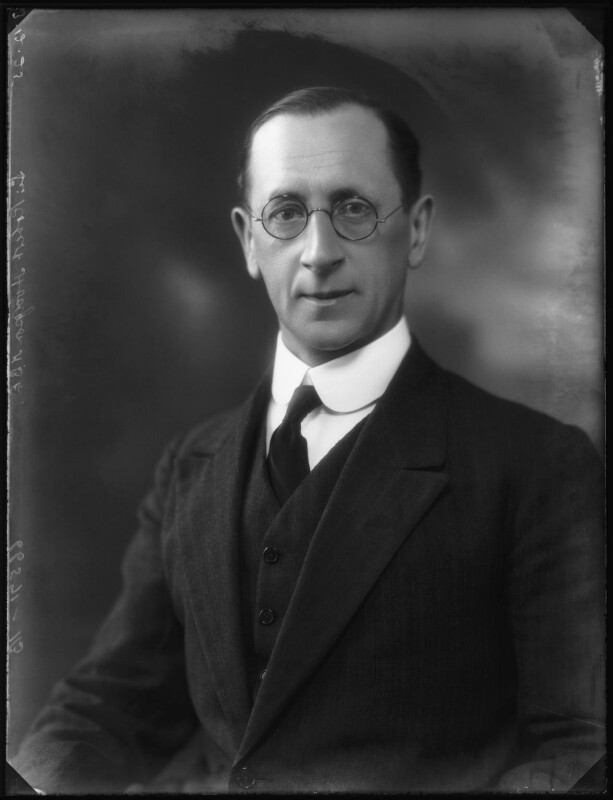
Hodgson in 1925

Sir Robert MacLeod Hodgson, KCMG, KBE (25 February 1874 – 18 October 1956) was a British diplomat and consul.

Hodgson was born in West Bromwich, Staffordshire, the son of the Reverend Robert Hodgson. He was educated at Radley College, near Abingdon in Oxfordshire, from 1887 to 1893, where he was a prefect, and Trinity College, Oxford, where he captained the University of Oxford hockey team and graduated with a pass degree in 1897.

He joined the Consular Service, working at the consulate in Algiers from 1901 to 1904 and becoming vice-consul at Marseille in 1904. In 1906, he was appointed commercial agent at Vladivostok and given the rank of vice-consul two years later and consul in 1911. He stayed in Vladivostok until 1919, when he was moved to Omsk as acting high commissioner to the anti-Bolshevik government. In November 1919, he was appointed commercial counsellor in Moscow. He married a Russian woman, Olga Bellavina, in 1920 and was appointed Companion of the Order of St Michael and St George (CMG) in the 1920 New Year Honours. He became Chargé d'affaires in 1924 following British official recognition of the communist government, but was recalled to Britain with the rest of the British diplomatic mission in 1927. He had been appointed Knight Commander of the Order of the British Empire (KBE) in 1925.

In 1928, he was appointed minister to Albania. He retired in August 1936, but in December 1937 returned to the Foreign Office as British agent to General Franco's government in Burgos, Spain. In December 1938, he was appointed chargé d'affaires, but was surprisingly not appointed ambassador to Spain when full diplomatic relations were established in April 1939, perhaps because of his wife having been born in Russia. Instead, Sir Samuel Hoare was appointed ambassador. Once again retiring, Hodgson was appointed Knight Commander of the Order of St Michael and St George (KCMG).

From 1943 to 1945, he was chairman of the council of the School of Slavonic and East European Studies, and from 1944 to 1945 an adviser to the Foreign Office on censorship.

On 9 October 1956, Hodgson tripped over the kerb and fell while crossing Sloane Street in Chelsea, fracturing his femur. This caused him to contract pneumonia and he died in hospital nine days later.
