= Neville Knox =

English cricketer

Personal information
- Full name: Neville Alexander Knox
- Born: 10 October 1884; Clapham, London, England
- Died: 3 March 1935 (aged 50); Surbiton, Surrey, England
- Batting: Right-handed
- Bowling: Right-arm fast

International information
- National side: England

Career statistics
Competition	Tests	First-class
Matches	2	88
Runs scored	24	905
Batting average	8.00	10.16
100s/50s	–/–	–/–
Top score	8*	45*
Balls bowled	126	14570
Wickets	3	411
Bowling average	35.00	21.55
5 wickets in innings	–	38
10 wickets in match	–	9
Best bowling	2/39	8/48
Catches/stumpings	–/–	32/–
- Source: Cricinfo

Neville Alexander Knox (10 October 1884 – 3 March 1935) was an English fast bowler of the late 1900s and effectively the successor to Tom Richardson and William Lockwood in the Surrey team. Because of his profession as a singer, Knox's cricket career was short, but he was undoubtedly the fastest bowler of his time and one of the fastest bowlers ever to play for England — probably capable of speeds over 150 km/h (93 mph).

== Life and career ==
Knox attended Dulwich College. He played two matches for Surrey in 1904 without achieving a great deal, but the following year, aided by some fiery pitches at The Oval, advanced so much that he was an excellent backup to Walter Lees in a major Surrey revival. Although he was expensive on true pitches Knox took 129 wickets for less than 22 runs each, and his promise was clearly noted, though even then the length (over 20 metres or 22 yards — very long for the time) of his run-up was seen as taking a great deal of energy out of him and it was thought Knox would have trouble coping with arduous seasons.

The following season — one with hardly a day of rain in the Home Counties after early May — bore out almost all that was thought of Knox. When sound, he was clearly the fastest bowler seen for a long time in county cricket and, even on much truer Oval pitches, he was able to make the ball rise dangerously. He could also spin the ball back from the off as much as Richardson at his best. Early in the season, Knox's bowling was beyond everything else the factor behind Surrey rising to the top of the table, and at times — notably against Leicestershire and Sussex at the Oval — his pace could bowl sides out cheaply on even the best of pitches. However, from the middle of June, the strain of bowling on such hard, sun-soaked pitches took its toll and Knox suffered constantly from shin strains. These strains kept him out of nine of Surrey's last sixteen matches and according to Wisden, Knox "often played when he should have been resting". Nonetheless, his twelve wickets for 174 against the Players at Lord's in July is still remembered as perhaps the fastest bowling ever seen in the history of Gentlemen v Players games: some of the professional batsmen were literally intimidated. Knox was rewarded for this and his superb early season form with nomination as a Cricketer of the Year by Wisden.

In 1907, though a wet summer severely restricted his opportunities, a superb effort against a powerful South African team earned Knox a place in the second Test at Headingley. This turned out to be a grievous error because he was a mere passenger on a very soft pitch, and even at The Oval in the third Test Knox did not achieve much. Indeed, not playing as regularly as before, Knox took only 44 County Championship wickets and 70 in all games — as against 117 and 144 in 1906.

At the end of 1907, Knox announced he would be playing no more first-class cricket, but soon before the 1908 season began it was expected he would play regularly in July and August. A superb performance for the Gentlemen at the Oval gave Surrey great hope he would be as good as in 1906, but he only played in three matches, and in 1909 could spare no time for cricket at all. 1910 saw Knox back in the Surrey eleven for five matches, in which he bowled as well as before, but after July he could never again spare any time for county cricket — thus ending a brief but brilliant career.

In the Great War Knox joined the Royal Army Ordnance Corps as a Lieutenant, being promoted to Captain in 1919 and ending his army career as a Major.

Continuing his career as a singer, Neville Knox was in poor health for many years before his death in 1935.
