= List of people from Thanet =

Among those who were born in the Isle of Thanet, or have lived/live there are (alphabetical order):

== Ramsgate ==
- Francis Austen (23 April 1774 – 10 August 1865), Admiral of the Fleet and brother of Jane Austen, the author, lived at 14 Albion Place
- Brenda Blethyn (born 20 February 1946) was born in Ramsgate. She is an English Golden Globe-winning and Academy Award-nominated actress of film, stage and television. She owns a house on Nelson Crescent and is a key supporter and Patron of The Granville Theatre/Granville Cinema in the town.
- Anthony Buckeridge (20 June 1912 – 28 June 2004), author best known for his Jennings series of novels, lived in Ramsgate and taught at St. Lawrence College.
- Francis Burnand (29 November 1836 – 21 April 1917), was an English comic writer and dramatist who lived much of his life in Ramsgate.
- Henry Curling (1847–1910), Royal Artillery officer, one of only five British officers to survive the Battle of Isandlwana (1879)
- John Deane (1800–1884), inventor of the diving helmet and discoverer of the Mary Rose in 1836, is buried in Ramsgate.
- Jim Driver (born 16 July 1954), is a writer and music promoter who has lived in Ramsgate since early 2014. He is one of the only three real-life figures mentioned in the movie This Is Spinal Tap.
- Elizabeth Fry, (1780–1845), prison reformer and Quaker philanthropist, died of a stroke in Bellevue Road, Ramsgate.
- Jefferson Hack, (born 20 June 1971), publisher, journalist and model, lived for many of his childhood and teenage years at Beech Grove, Cliffsend, near Ramsgate.
- Edward Heath (9 July 1916 – 17 July 2005), British Prime Minister, attended Chatham House Grammar School.
- Sean Kerly (born 29 January 1960), Olympic gold medallist for hockey, was educated at Chatham House Grammar School.
- John Le Mesurier (1912–1983), actor famous for playing Sgt Arthur Wilson in the BBC sitcom Dad's Army, lived his later years at 8 London Road, Ramsgate. In August 2010 a memorial plaque was unveiled there. He is buried at St George's Church in the town.
- Karl Marx (1818–1883), known to have stayed in the town some nine times. as did his comrade Friedrich Engels One known spot is in Hardres Street. His eldest daughter Jenny Longuet Marx (1844–1883) lived for a period at 6 Artillery Road.
- Moses Montefiore (24 October 1784 – 28 July 1885), prominent British Jewish campaigner, philanthropist and stockbroker, was heavily involved in the affairs of Ramsgate and owned East Cliff Lodge. His tomb is next to the synagogue in Ramsgate.
- Frank Muir (5 February 1920 – 2 January 1998), comedy scriptwriter and broadcaster, was born at the Derby Arms, Margate Road, Ramsgate and educated at Chatham House Grammar School.
- Gary Pallister (born 30 June 1965), footballer who played for Manchester United F.C. and Middlesbrough F.C., was born in Ramsgate.
- Jackie Pallo (12 January 1926 – 11 February 2006), born Jack Gutteridge, wrestler and TV personality, lived in Ramsgate in his final years.
- Augustus Welby Northmore Pugin (1812–1852), Victorian Gothic architect, lived for a time at St Augustine's Grange (The Grange), and is buried next door in Pugin's Church and Shrine of St Augustine.
- Kirk Shepherd, who lives in Ramsgate, is the youngest player to reach a final of the World Professional Darts Championship. He uses the nicknames Young Gun and Karate Kid.
- David Lee Stone, fantasy author who lives in Ramsgate.
- Dr Chris Tame (20 December 1949 – 20 March 2006), founder of the Libertarian Alliance and a former director of FOREST, spent the last years of his life in Ramsgate.
- Gregory Venables, Archbishop Primate of South America, Headmaster St Andrews College, Paraguay, lived 1956-1968, 1972-1977 in Ramsgate. Founder member The Phonetics and Purple Trolley Bus rock groups. Pupil at Chatham House School, teacher Holy Cross School.
- Vincent van Gogh, taught French and other subjects as a supply teacher at a school at 6 Royal Road and boarded at 11 Spencer Square for a period in 1876. He made some sketches of the view from his lodgings overlooking the harbour. The proprietor of the school relocated to Isleworth, Middlesex. Vincent decided to walk to the new location, which took three days via Canterbury and Chatham. This new position did not work out, and Vincent became a nearby Methodist minister's assistant in wanting to "preach the gospel everywhere".
- Queen Victoria, as a princess spent her holidays in Ramsgate, staying at Townley House, now part of J. C. Farleys Ltd, a furniture store.
- Alfred North Whitehead, mathematician, was born in Ramsgate.
- Stephen Edwin Yarnold, Australian army chaplain

== Broadstairs ==
- Sir Richard Rodney Bennett (1936-2012), composer and pianist, was born in Broadstairs.
- John Buchan (1875–1940) was rumoured to have based his thriller The Thirty Nine Steps on the set of steps on the beach at North Foreland, Broadstairs, where he was recuperating from a duodenal ulcer in 1915.
- Thomas Russell Crampton (1816–1888), an engineer, is remembered as a designer of locomotives and of railways, also concerned with gas, waterworks and a submarine telegraph cable. He was the first to lay an effective telegraph cable under the English Channel. A water tower and a pub in the town are named after him.
- Brian Degas, (1935-2020) author, writer and creator of the TV Series Colditz, lived in the town.
- Charles Dickens, novelist, had a holiday home in Broadstairs, where he wrote David Copperfield. For a period he owned Fort House on a promontory above the town, where he wrote Bleak House, which the location is now called.
- Edward Heath, (9 July 1916 – 17 July 2005), former Conservative leader and Prime Minister, was born here and lived in Albion Road, St. Peters.
- Annette Mills (1894–1955), one-time concert pianist and elder sister of actor Sir John Mills, lived in Broadstairs. She is best remembered for the early television programme Muffin the Mule in the 1950s.
- Trevor Neal of the TV comic duo Trevor and Simon, notable for the Saturday children's show Going Live!, lives in Broadstairs.
- Mike Nolan of 1980s pop group Bucks Fizz lives in Broadstairs.
- Bill Pitt MP, the first member of Parliament elected for the SDP–Liberal Alliance, 1981–83, lives in Broadstairs.
- Oliver Postgate, creator of the children's TV puppet shows, the Clangers, Bagpuss and others, retired to Broadstairs, where he died on 8 December 2008, aged 83. A plaque has been erected on his home in Chandos Square.
- Gary Rhodes celebrity TV chef was a student of catering at the Thanet College.
- Frank Richards (pen name of Charles Harold St John Hamilton; 1875–1961), writer of the Billy Bunter novels, lived in Kingsgate, Broadstairs.
- Bruce Robinson, author of Withnail and I etc., was born in Broadstairs in 1946.
- Siouxsie Sioux (born Susan Janet Ballion, 27 May 1957) spent summer holidays in Broadstairs during her childhood.
- Stevie Smith, poet, spent several years on and off in a sanatorium near Broadstairs while suffering from tuberculous peritonitis as a child.
- Queen Victoria spent many summers in Broadstairs as a child, staying at Pierremont Hall.
- Jack Warner, Dixon of Dock Green, lived in Kingsgate for a time.
- Doris Waters, BBC radio comedian, and sister to Elsie Waters, famous for being part of female double act, Gert and Daisy, lived in Broadstairs.
- Elsie Waters, BBC radio comedian and with her sister Doris Waters the double act Gert and Daisy, lived in Broadstairs. They were sisters of Jack Warner.

== Margate ==
- Iain Aitch is an English writer and journalist who was born in Margate.
- Peter Barkworth (1929–2006), actor, was born in Margate.
- Ballard Berkeley (1904–1988), actor best known as the senile Major Gowen in the TV series Fawlty Towers, was born in Margate.
- Dave Cash (1942-2016) broadcaster of Kenny and Cash fame, lived in the village of
- T. S. Eliot, poet, wrote part of The Waste Land in Margate in 1922, whilst recuperating from nervous strain.
- Tracey Emin, artist, grew up in Margate. In 2011 she helped to open the Turner Contemporary Art Gallery.
- Marty Feldman, comic writer and comedian, began his career aged 15 as part of a circus-style act at Dreamland Funpark in Margate.
- Melanie and Martina Grant, twin actresses, were born in Margate and now live in Ramsgate.
- Trevor Howard, film stage and television actor, was born in Cliftonville, Margate.
- Juliette Kaplan, actress (real name: Marlene Hoser), who played Pearl in the BBC sitcom Last of the Summer Wine, lives in Westgate-on-Sea, Margate.
- Dinsdale Landen (1932–2003), actor on stage and television, was born in Margate.
- Steven Moore, former world champion water-ski racer, currently lives in Thanet.
- Thomas Webster Rammell, railway engineer, was born in Dent de Lion, near Margate.
- Mike Stock, British songwriter and record producer best known as a member of the song-writing and record production trio Stock Aitken Waterman. He was born in Margate on 3 December 1951.
- Mehrdud Takalobigashi, better known as Takaloo (born 23 September 1975), is an Iranian-born, British-based boxer living in Margate.
- Douglas Trendle, better known as Buster Bloodvessel (born 6 September 1958), is a Ska singer in the 1980s British band Bad Manners, and ran the hotel in Margate called Fatty Towers for part of the 1990s.
- J. M. W. Turner sketched many Margate skies that were later incorporated into his paintings. The Turner Contemporary Art Gallery is named in his honour.
- Sir Robert Walpole, British Prime Minister, spent summers in Cliftonville, Margate and has Walpole Bay and the Walpole Bay Hotel named after him.
- David Watkin (1925–2008), Oscar-winning cinematographer, was born in Margate.
- Lilian Wyles (1885–1975), pioneer woman detective at Scotland Yard, was educated at Thanet Hall, Margate.
