= Yarnold =

Yarnold is a surname. Notable people with the surname include:

- David Yarnold (born 1952), American conservationist
- Edward Yarnold (1926–2002), English Jesuit
- Hugo Yarnold (1917–1974), English cricketer
- Lizzy Yarnold (born 1988), British skeleton racer
- Stephen Edwin Yarnold (1903–1978), Australian army chaplain
- Walter Yarnold (1893–1978), English cricketer
