= Christopher Anstey =

English poet

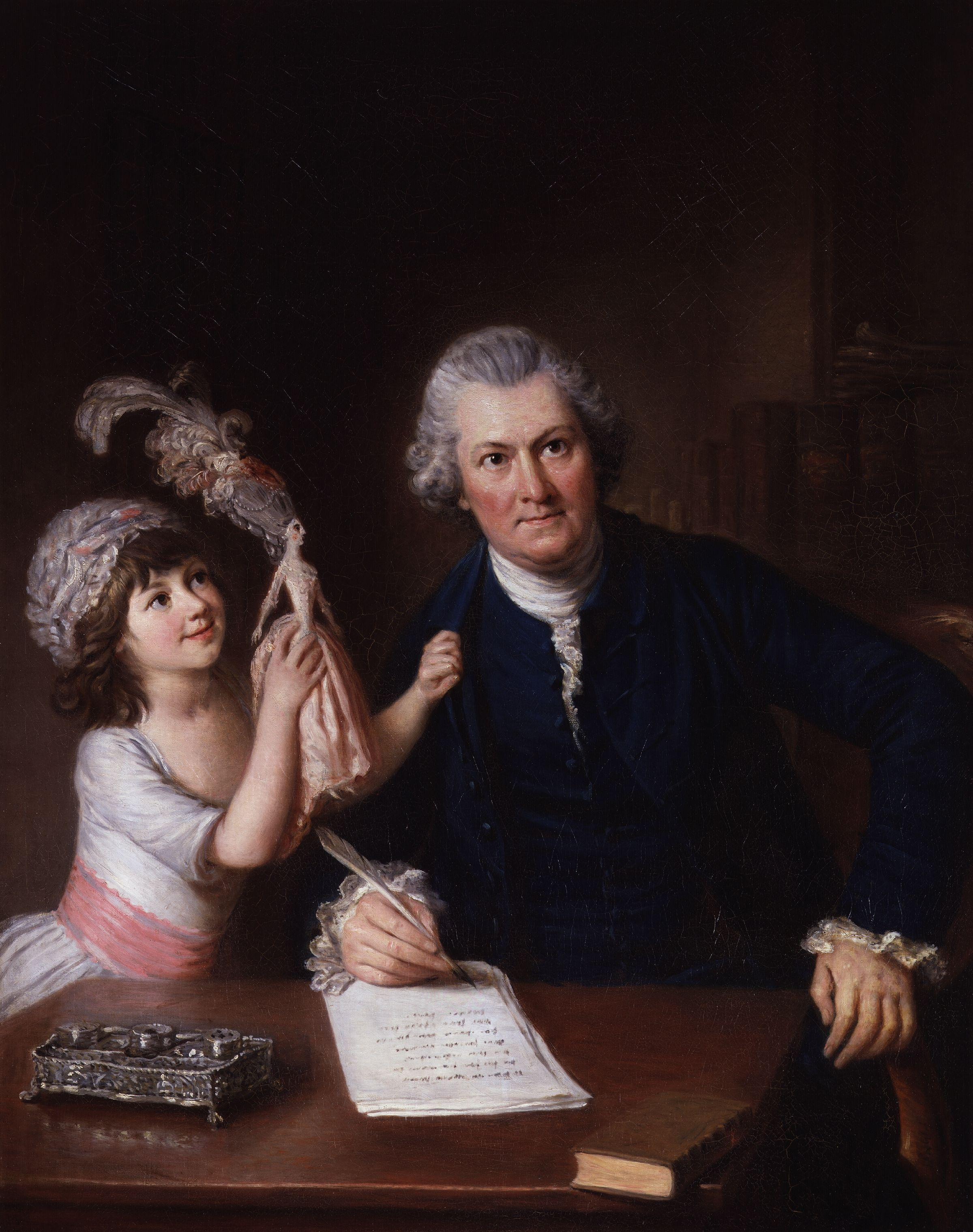
- Anstey with his daughter, by William Hoare (c. 1777)
- Born: 31 October 1724; Brinkley, Cambridgeshire, England
- Died: 3 August 1805 (aged 80); Bath, Somerset, England
- Occupations: writer, poet
- Notable work: The New Bath Guide (1766)
- Spouse: Ann Calvert (m.1756)
- Children: 13

Christopher Anstey (31 October 1724 – 3 August 1805) was an English poet who also wrote in Latin. After a period managing his family's estates, he moved permanently to Bath and died after a long public life there. His poem, The New Bath Guide, brought him to fame and began an easy satirical fashion that was influential throughout the second half of the 18th century. Later he wrote An Electoral Ball, another burlesque of Bath society that allowed him to develop and update certain themes in his earlier work. Among his Latin writing were translations and summaries based on both these poems; he was also joint author of one of the earliest Latin translations of Gray's Elegy Written in a Country Churchyard, which went through several editions both in England and abroad.

== Life ==
Anstey was the third child and only son of the Rev. Dr. Christopher Anstey, the rector of Brinkley in Cambridgeshire, and his wife Mary Thompson, born on 31 October 1724 in Trumpington. He was educated at Eton College and King's College, Cambridge, where he distinguished himself for his Latin verses. He became a fellow of his college in 1745 but the degree of M.A. was withheld from him in 1749 owing to his defiance of the university authorities and the offence caused by an address that is said to have begun "Doctors without doctrine, artless masters of arts, and bachelors more worthy of the rod than the laurel..." (Note: Latin: Doctores sine doctrina, magistri artium sine artibus, et baccalaurei baculo potius quam lauro digni...) He joined the Middle Temple in 1746, but was not called to the bar.

In 1754, having succeeded to the prosperous family estates (including Anstey Hall in Trumpington), Anstey withdrew from the university. Two years later, he married Ann Calvert (1732–1812), daughter of Felix Calvert and the sister of his friend John Calvert of Albury Hall, Hertfordshire. For a considerable time Anstey lived the life of a country squire, cultivating letters as well as his estates, but publishing little of any note for many years. His family grew to include thirteen children, eight of whom survived him.

Following a period of depression aggravated by ill health after the death of a beloved sister in 1760, Anstey was advised to take the waters at the fashionable spa of Bath. Impressed by the place, he returned annually and decided to settle there permanently in 1770, his home being at No. 4 Royal Crescent for the next thirty-five years. (Note: The plaque recording this is actually displayed outside No. 5.) In 1766, he achieved fame following the publication of The New Bath Guide: or Memoirs of the B__n__r__d Family in a series of Poetical Epistles, which went through some twenty editions before 1800. The work was enthusiastically praised for its gently satirical humour by such literary figures as Horace Walpole and Thomas Gray.

Later Anstey composed a work in the same vein, An Election Ball, in Poetical Letters from Mr Inkle at Bath to his Wife at Gloucester, published in 1776. The theme had been suggested to him at the literary gatherings of the Batheaston Literary Circle which he had been attending and to the last of whose regular anthologies he contributed. Other suggested themes occasioned published works of some length, but the connection did his reputation more damage than otherwise and was ended with the death of the coterie's patroness, Anna, Lady Miller, in 1781. In the years that followed, he thought of collecting his poems for general publication but the project was only finally completed by his son John in 1808.

Although Anstey declared himself uninterested in public office, he had served as High Sheriff of Cambridgeshire and Huntingdonshire for 1770–71, on the eve of his move to Bath. Once there, he busied himself in various philanthropic ventures, such as supporting the scheme for the support of the poor on behalf of which the Batheaston Circle's Poetical Amusements were sold. In addition he served between 1781 and 1795 on the board of governors of Bath Hospital, for whom he wrote effective fund-raising poems. Later he supported the work of Hannah More, in whose series of Cheap Repository Tracts appeared his long ballad, "The Farmer's Daughter, a poetical tale" (1795). His final Latin poem, the Alcaic stanzas addressed to Edward Jenner on his work on inoculation (1803), demonstrated the persistence of his humanitarian interests.

Anstey's normally strong constitution gave way early in 1805. He died on 3 August, and was buried at St. Swithin's Church in Walcot, Bath. Later a white marble memorial tablet was placed in the Poets' Corner of Westminster Abbey.

== Poetry ==
=== In Latin ===
Poetry in Latin makes up only a quarter of Anstey's published output, but his poetical career both began and ended with it. His first major work was a translation undertaken in collaboration with his friend William Hayward Roberts, also a Fellow at King's College at the time, and published anonymously in 1762. This was Eligia Scripta in Coemeterio Rustico Latine reddita, a version of Thomas Gray's already celebrated "Elegy Written in a Country Churchyard" of 1751, on which they worked in consultation with the author himself.

Commenting on the draft sent him, Gray remarked that "Every language has its idiom, not only of words and phrases, but of customs and manners, which cannot be represented in the tongue of another nation, especially of a nation so distant in time and place, without constraint and difficulty; of this sort, in the present instance, are the curfew bell, the Gothic Church, with its monuments, organs and anthems, the texts of Scripture, &c. There are certain images, which, though drawn from common nature, and every where obvious, yet strike us as foreign to the turn and genius of Latin verse; the beetle that flies in the evening, to a Roman, I guess, would have appeared too mean an object for poetry." And further on he enquires, "Might not the English characters here be romanized? Virgil is just as good as Milton, and Cæsar as Cromwell."

Gray's stance was traditionalist and did not take account of the way Vincent Bourne's poems had already demonstrated how Latin could be adapted to express contemporary reality. Preferring the latter's approach, for the most part, Anstey's version tries to remain faithful to Gray's text and certainly retains the historical English names rather than making Roman substitutes. It was published anonymously in 1762 and was later to appear in the 1768 and 1775 Irish editions of Gray's poems, along with an Italian and two other Latin versions of the Elegy. In 1778 there appeared an emended translation in which the introductory lines were signed C. A. et W. H. R. This was subsequently reprinted in Venice in 1794 and from there made its way into Alessandro Torri's multilingual anthology of translations of the Elegy, published in Verona in 1817.

In later years Anstey went on to translate himself. First there was his version of "Letter XIV" from The New Bath Guide, that was only included in the posthumous collected edition of his work. This was a 'humorous and whimsical' tour de force with both internal and end-rhymes, exactly fitting the spirit of the original. Secondly, there was the résumé of the themes in his later The Election Ball in a 1777 Latin epistle to its would-be illustrator Coplestone Warre Bampfylde, of which an English adaptation, 'translated and addressed to the ladies', appeared separately in the same year. Anstey's other translation during that time was of the fables of John Gay, undertaken originally for the guidance of his sons, whom he was preparing for entrance into Eton. This was published anonymously in a badly edited state, then subsequently revised for a new edition in 1798. However, reviewers complained of its rigid metres and 'diffusion extended into weakness' as being badly fitted to the sprightly octosyllabics of Gay's original. It had too much of the schoolroom about it.

=== In English ===
Anstey was principally known for his long epistolary poem, The New Bath Guide. He never quite recaptured the success of that work, which was continuously in print throughout his lifetime, although he returned to humorous depiction of the same Bath types in such works as An Election Ball and "The Decayed Macaroni". Finding little to admire in such sequels, Horace Walpole judged that Anstey "ought to have shot himself the moment he had finished the Bath Guide", but others since have seen more to respect.

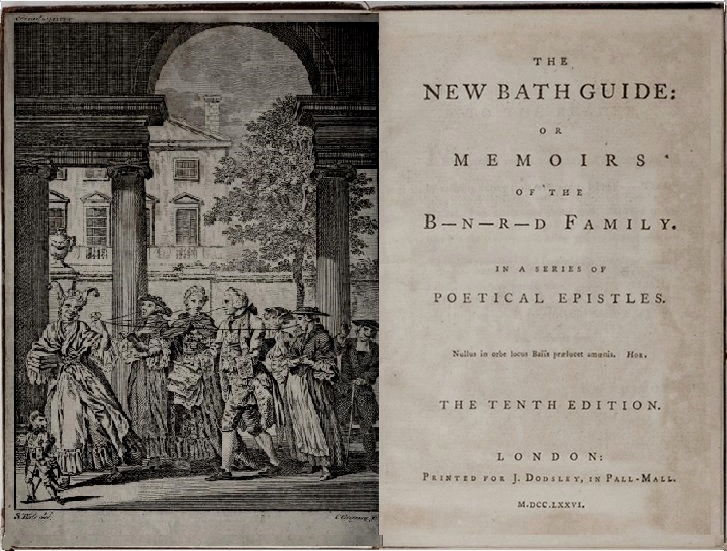
New Bath Guide, 10th edition, 1776

Gray described the Guide as having "a new and original kind of humour", although in terms of the Classical models of his time it could be described as satire on the good-natured Horatian model. The alternative sharp Juvenilian style of the recently deceased satirist Charles Churchill was not for him. Indeed, in an unfinished poem preserved by his son, he had declared himself

Unskill'd in flattery's softer arts,
Unfit for satire's pointed darts,
Else would my faithful muse reveal
What wights bestride the commonweal.

Instead he made his subject matter the familiar follies of the landed squirearchy in a poem that, "while it includes a number of particular and topical Bath references to give the flavour of the place and time, has sufficient scope and is written from enough of a detached viewpoint to make its critique of manners and morals of enduring application." The work's eventual frontispiece clarifies Anstey's good-natured aim. Pictured there is a procession of the fashionable headed by a monkey and a Momus clown with, in leash, the fashionable crowd they lead by the nose.

Commenting on the appearance of the Guide, published far away in Cambridge on the other side of the country by an unknown author, his son later marvelled that "It was hardly possible that a work of this description...could have made its appearance under circumstances of greater disadvantage." The title was an added hindrance at first, since the third edition of the official city guide, now titled The New Bath Guide or useful pocket companion, had been published in 1765, the year before Anstey's work. Though it provided a useful point of reference to readers, repeated editions of the pocket companion, 'corrected and much enlarged', continued to sow confusion for as long as the two books continued to appear.

The Guide relates the misadventures of the three naïve children of a Northern squire, as reported by them over the course of fifteen letters to friends and parents, and incidentally give a comic picture of life in the spa. In a far departure from the Augustan manner common until then, the style is colloquial and written in loose anapaestic tetrameters, later to be characterised as the "Anstey measure" or "Bath-guide verse".

'Tis this that provokes Mrs.SHENKIN Ap-LEEK
To dine at the ord'nary twice in a week,
Tho' at home she might get a good dinner in comfort,
Nor pay such a cursed extravagant sum for't:
But then her acquaintance would never have known
Mrs.SHENKIN AP-LEEK had acquir'd a "bon ton";
Ne'er shewn how in taste the AP-LEEKS can excel
The Duchess of TRUFFLES, and Lady MORELL;
Had ne'er been ador'd by Sir PYE MACARONI,
And Count VERMICELLI, his intimate crony;
Both men of such taste, their opinions are taken
From an ortolan down to a rasher of bacon.

The inventiveness of the rhymes and the puns on the ridiculous names given to the characters adds further humour here.

Such naming, an aspect of the work which was widely admired, derives from theatrical practice at the time and gives a clue to the person's character, but in the case of the main protagonists there is added irony too. Their Blunderhead surname not only sums up the various meanings of the word 'blunder' in their behaviour but has the overtones of stupidity contained in the colloquial 'dunderhead' as well. This is further emphasised in the son's first name, Simkin, which is a dialect expression denoting a simpleton. The behaviour of his sister Prudence, on the other hand, is at variance with her name. She most imprudently allows herself to be seduced by a Methodist imposter with the expressive name of Roger, the slang meaning of which is sexual intercourse, while in dialect it refers to a tricky person.

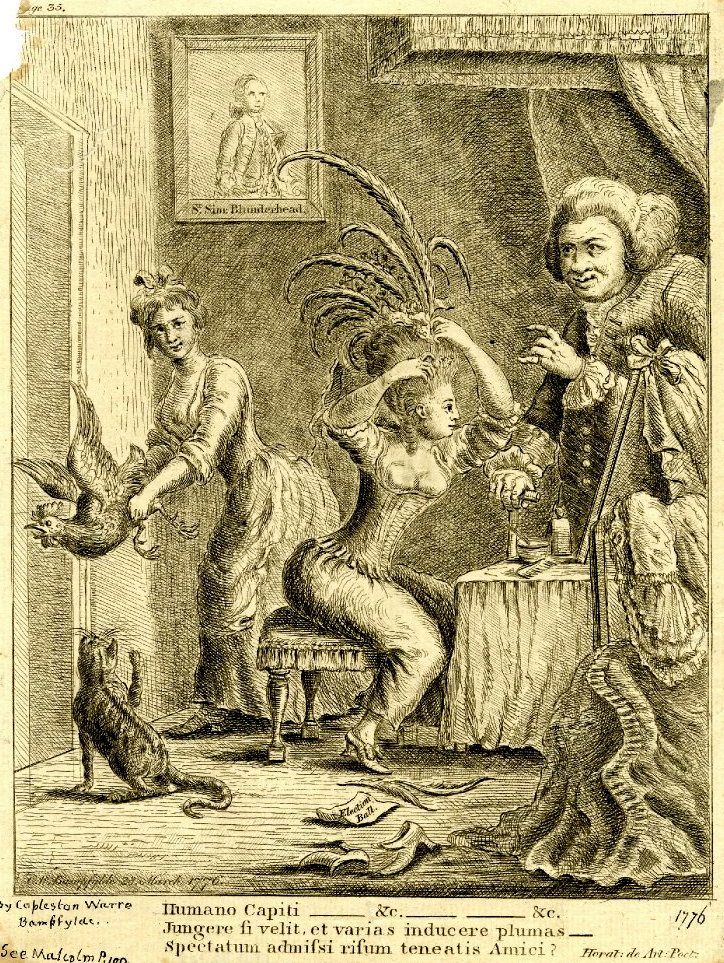
An illustration to Anstey's An Election Ball (1776) by Coplestone Warre Bampfylde

The broad 18th century humour of the Guide inevitably met with criticism in some quarters. While the parodies and allusions to Milton, Dryden and the Classical authors were well received, the perversion of Methodist terminology in Prudence's account of her seduction at least caused controversy. To dispel some of this, the second edition contained an epilogue which added considerably to the book's length but light-heartedly tried to meet some of the objections. Nevertheless, a comment at the start of the more prudish 19th century concerning "those violations of decency which disgust us in the New Bath Guide" indicates that they were not forgotten.

When Anstey returned to a burlesque of Bath society a decade later in An Electoral Ball, it allowed him to embroider on some of his earlier themes. Thus Simkin's shocked account of female hairdressing in "Letter XII" of the Guide was expanded to outright farce in An Election Ball and had an immediate effect. In Samuel Hoare's conversation piece portrait of him (see above), his daughter is shown trying to draw his attention to the extravagant doll in her hand, in reality the kind of lay figure sent from Paris to guide dressmakers in the latest styles. Though she seems to distract him from composition, she is also serving as muse, for the doll's fantastic hairstyle is just such as, judging from the pattern of lines on his manuscript, Anstey went on to describe in the poem: "To a cap like a bat / (Which was once my cravat) / Part gracefully patted and pinn'd is, / Part stuck upon gauze/ Resembles mackaws/ And all the fine birds of the Indies."

It was this episode too, featuring Madge Inkle as she confects a hair ornament from the purloined tail feathers of the rooster, that Anstey's friend Coplestone Warre Bampfylde chose as the first scene to illustrate in An Election Ball. Arriving too late for inclusion in the revised edition of 1776, they were first used instead in the Latin epistle that Anstey addressed to Bampfylde, including mention of all the scenes the artist had chosen to picture.

== Literary influence ==
=== 18th century ===
Anstey was an innovator in more ways than one. He was the first to make tourism a poetic subject since the pilgrimage depicted by Geoffrey Chaucer in his Canterbury Tales. The epistolary mode which Anstey chose for his characters allowed their different voices to be distinguished in the same way as Chaucer's were through their narratives. But at the same time, the relaxed anapaestic measure united within it the work's impressionistic diversity.

Added evidence of the way that Anstey's social comedy had captured the general imagination is given by the large number of imitations that followed its publication. They were of several kinds, however, and at first were directly dependent on The New Bath Guide for their context, the earliest being the complimentary Poetical Epistles to the author of the New Bath Guide (London, 1767). It was followed by a youthful imitation of Anstey's manner by Richard Brinsley Sheridan, first published in The Bath Chronicle as a satirical account of the opening ball at the New Assembly Rooms in 1771. The convoluted title of this occasional piece was "The Ridotto of Bath, a Panegyrick written by a Gentleman, resident in that City: Being an Epistle from Timothy Screw, Under Server to Messrs Kuhf and Fitzwater, to his brother Henry, Waiter at Almack's" and was dependent on Anstey's work in several particulars. Another close imitation was The Register of Folly, or characters and incidents at Bath, containing twelve poetical epistles 'by an invalid' (London 1773).

Anstey's An Election Ball (1776) and its reporting in three letters is not only an imitation of his own manner in the New Bath Guide but takes further Sheridan's later ballroom satire. Created initially for the amusement of the Batheaston set, it also flattered the town in general by its use of local references. Much later there came another derivative reference to the Guide itself in John Williams' A Postscript to the New Bath Guide by Anthony Pasquin (1790).

But other health resorts than Bath were coming into vogue, and to these Anstey's manner began to be applied by other authors, one of the earliest being the Tunbridge Epistles from Lady Margaret to the Countess of B, mentioned in The Monthly Review for May 1767. Although the majority of such works lacked the charm of novelty, and often attracted scornful reviews, George Dallas at least made his name with an exotic adaptation. This was The India Guide, or Journal of a Voyage to the East Indies in the Year 1780: In a Poetical Epistle to Her Mother by Emily Brittle (Calcutta 1785), which he dedicated to Anstey.

As the new fad of sea-bathing replaced the hot springs at Bath, the pseudonymous Anthony Pasquin now found the success that eluded him with his Postscript to the New Bath Guide by bringing Anstey's title up to date with The new Brighton guide, or companion for young ladies and gentlemen to all the watering-places in Great Britain: with notes, historical, moral, and personal (1796). It immediately became a best-seller, but in succeeding editions the main emphasis was redirected to satire of the Prince Regent, who had favoured Brighton as a resort. With that came an alteration of the poem's title to The New Brighton Guide; Involving a Complete, Authentic, and Honourable Solution of the Recent Mysteries of Carlton House that promised "Momentous Alterations and Additions". The work consisted of a series of epistles – moral, sentimental, serious and didactic – between the Royal Pavilion and the Regent's associated London residences.

In the following year an anonymous work featured the alternative health resort of Ramsgate in The Sea-Side, a Poem, in Familiar Epistles from Mr Simkin Slenderwit Summerising at Ramsgate, to His Dear Mother in Town (1797). Richard Scrafton Sharpe (c. 1780 -1852) chose a nearby town for his imitation, The Margate new guide; or memoirs of five families out of six Who, in Town discontent with a good Situation, Make Margate the Place of their Summer Migration (1799). It too deployed Anstey's almost obligatory jogtrot rhythm in what a contemporary review summed up as "ten letters, humorously describing in lively verse the usual diversions of that place and the company who resort to it." Another reviewer, however, found it poorer by comparison with The New Bath Guide.

Several more authors had rushed in where Anstey had feared to tread and adapted his style, and even his characters, to political themes. They include Ralph Broome's The Letters of Simkin the Second, poetic recorder of all the proceedings upon the trial of Warren Hastings (London 1789); followed by The New Parliamentary Register in a series of poetical epistles (1791), which was dedicated to Anstey and featured Simkin as a newly elected Member of Parliament.

=== 19th century ===
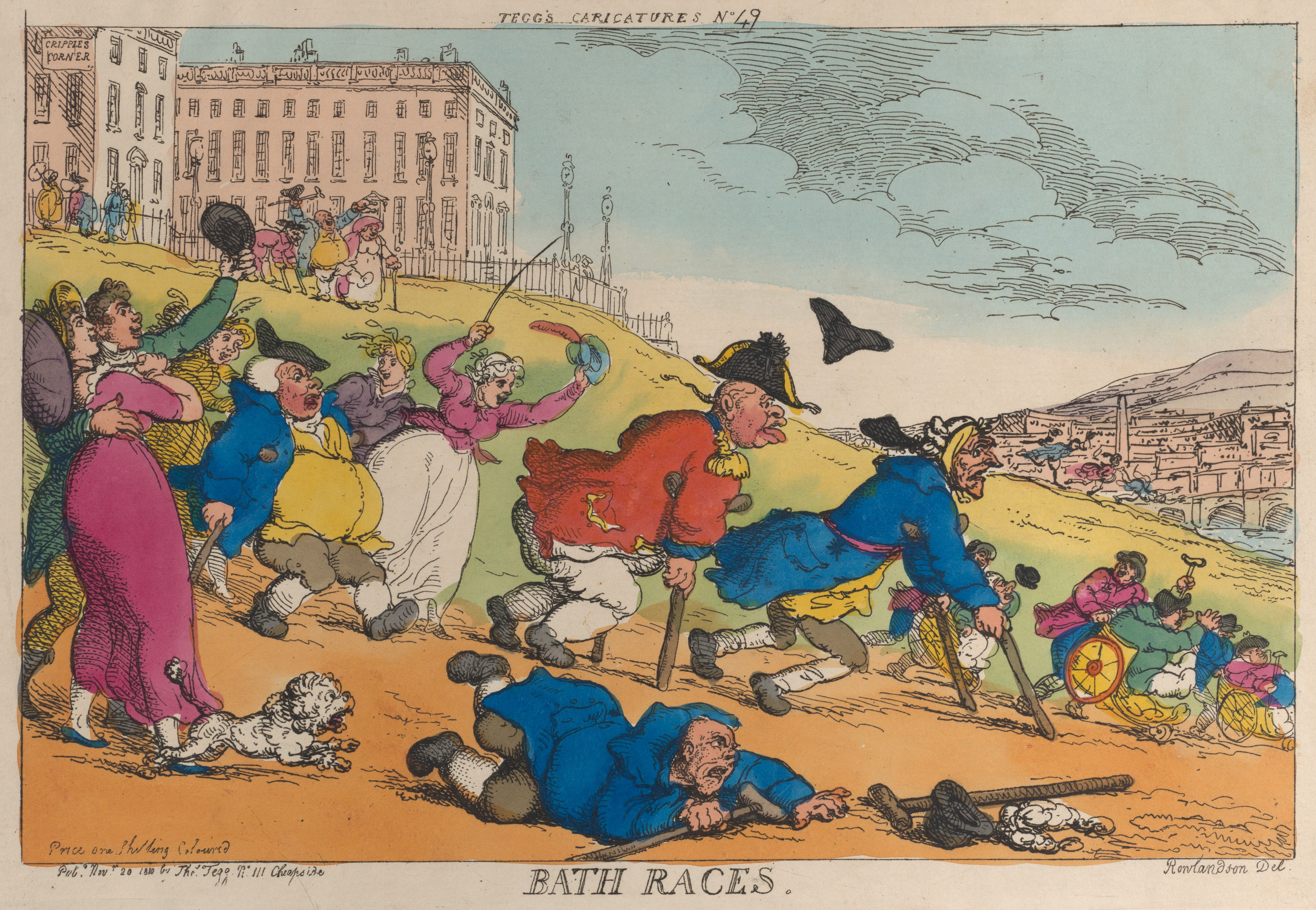
Thomas Rowlandson's caricature of Bath diversions, 1810

The trend of adaptations of Anstey's manner to other themes extended into the nineteenth century. In the political sphere there was George Watson-Taylor's The Cross-Bath Guide, being the Correspondence of a Respectable Family upon the subject of a late unexpected Dispensation of Honours (1815), although a reviewer found that "the imitation is not quite the equal, in point of wit, to the original" model by Anstey. There were also surveys of newly developing resort towns: by Barbara Hofland in A Season in Harrogate, in a series of poetical epistles by Benjamin Blunderhead Esquire to his mother in Derbyshire (1812) and by William Henry Halpin in The Cheltenham Mailbag: or letters from Gloucestershire, edited by Peter Quince the Younger (1820).

Meanwhile, Bath was again becoming fashionable as a spa town, a development underlined by the arrival of Queen Charlotte in 1817, leading a royal party. The place had been newly celebrated already in John Cam Hobhouse's The Wonders of a Week in Bath in a doggerel address in 1811. That poem was followed a few years later by two linked works: Rough Sketches of Bath by Q in the Corner (Bath 1817), described by a later critic as "little else than clever imitations of Anstey", and by Epistles from Bath, or Q’s letters to his Yorkshire relations (1817). Though these were published anonymously at the time, Thomas Haynes Bayly eventually identified himself as "Q" (and his target as Anstey) in a "Pastoral Duet between Robert Montgomery and Thomas Haynes Bayly", published in Fraser's Magazine:

I sang about Bath till I bothered them really,
And eclipsed was Kit Anstey by Thomas Haynes Bayly.

Imitative works were now being extended into series as their authors sought to outdo their predecessors. A further anonymous collection of letters in Anstey measure appeared as A Summer in Bath in 1822, but quoting Bayly at the start by way of "Advertisement". However, Thomas Moore's The Fudge Family in Paris (1818) marked an original departure and provided a more successful model for satirical imitation. Moore's work brought Anstey's manner up to date and widened its scope. Four family members visit the completely different setting of Paris after the Bourbon restoration. Their various characters and points of view are reflected in more varied verse measures, in which the anapaestics of the family's younger generation contrast with the iambics of their elders, and the politics treated are those that followed the Congress of Vienna. Just as important for the more straight-laced audience of the time, the love interest provided by Biddy Fudge and her suitor replaces with farcical social satire the coarseness once deplored in Anstey's treatment of Prudence Blunderhead. Later imitations were to transfer relatives of the Fudge family to the Scottish and American capitals and to Ireland (1822). Then a French Fudge turns the tables by visiting the English capital and describing life there to his exiled relative in France.

At the decade's end, an inhabitant of Bath, refusing to be dazzled by the recent tourist preference for capital cities, called the strayed brood of imitators to heel with Eight Letters from Bath by the Fidget Family (Bath, 1830) in impeccable Anstey measure. Nor was it until 1835 that the harassed and impecunious Moore could himself get round, much too late, to writing his own sequel, The Fudges in England. That too was set, according to its preface, in "a well-known fashionable watering place". But though the work sold well, the critical response was muted. "Mr Moore’s poetical rabies is incurable" commented the reviewer of The Dublin University Magazine. A modern judgment, comparing Moore's original work and its sequel, finds that while "in the first Fudge saga, the influence of Anstey is less evident", the story line of the second is much more derivative. In any case, writers seem to have decided by now that enough was enough and no further imitations of Anstey followed.

=== 20th century ===
A later tribute came from John Betjeman in 1973. As a trustee of the Bath Preservation Trust since the 1940s, he protested the depredations of philistine developers in "The Newest Bath Guide", quoting from and addressing Anstey. Its final couplet demonstrates how much Betjeman was indebted to him for his own art of satirical rhyming:

Goodbye to old Bath! We who loved you are sorry
They're carting you off by developer's lorry.
