= Coplestone Warre Bampfylde =

English painter

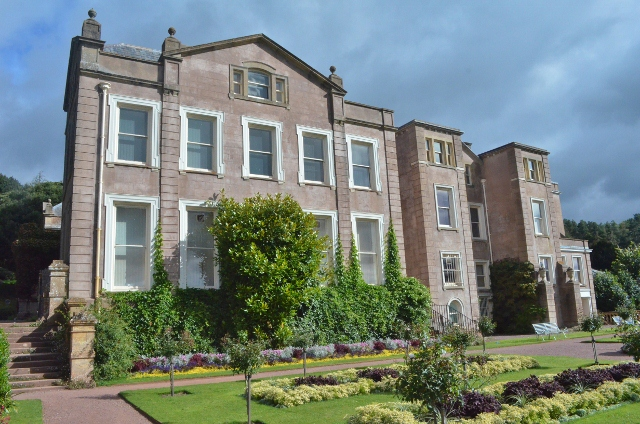
Hestercombe House

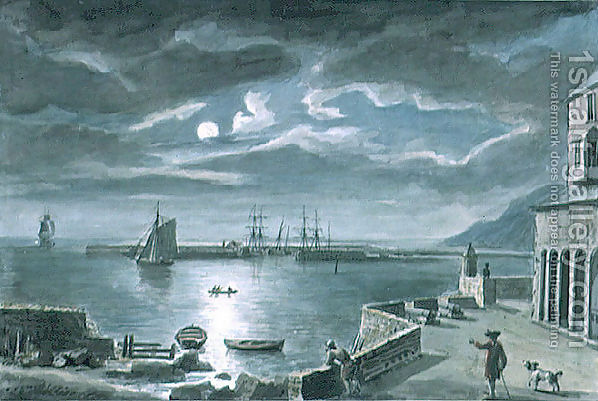
The Harbour And The Cobb, Lyme Regis, Dorset, By Moonlight by Bampfylde

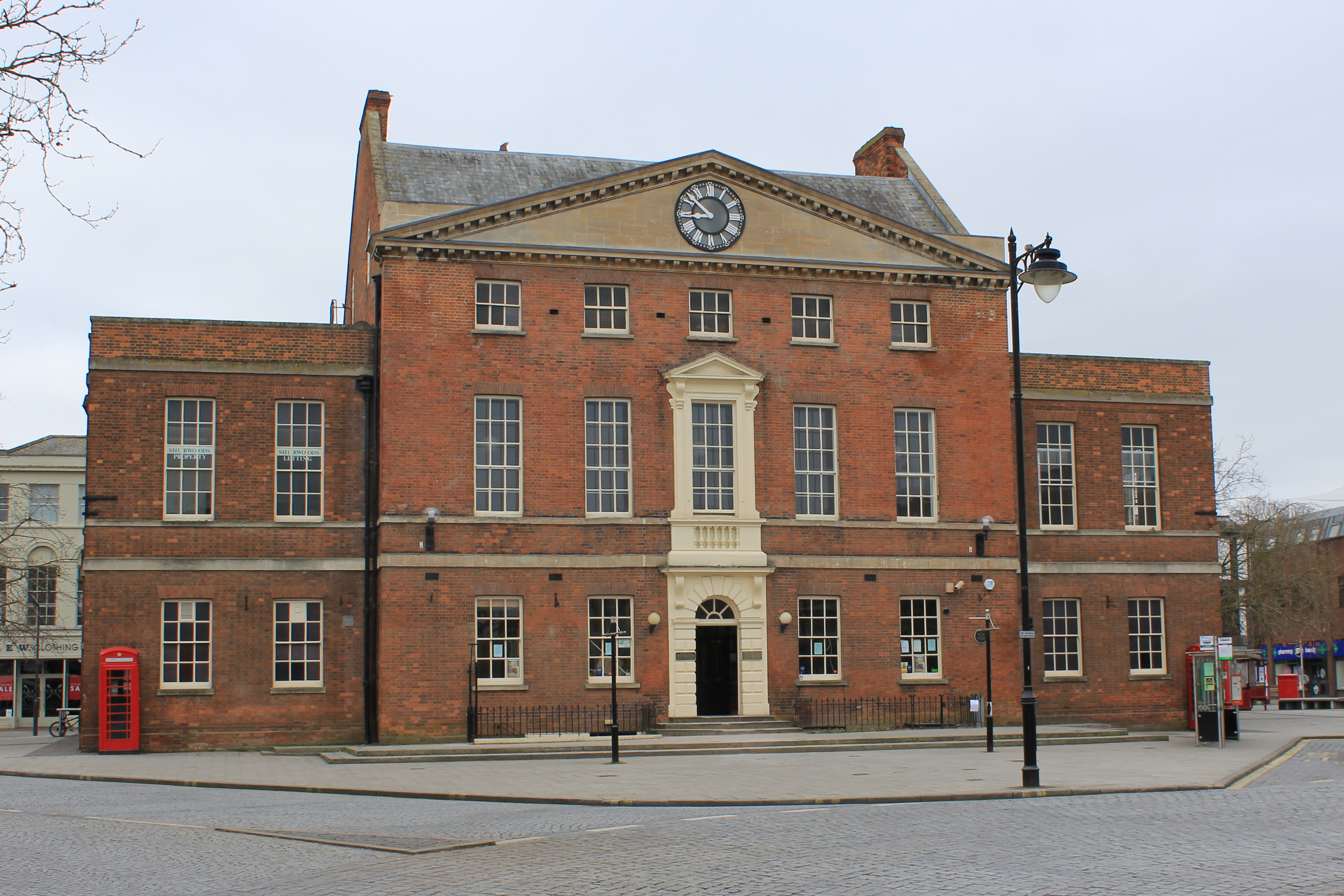
Market House, Taunton, built to Bampfylde's designs in 1772

Coplestone Warre Bampfylde (1720–1791) was a British landowner, garden designer and artist.

== Life ==
Bampfylde was the only son of John Bampfylde by Margaret, daughter and heiress of Sir Francis Warre, 1st Baronet, and was educated at Blundell's School and Winchester.

In 1750, following the death of his father, he inherited Hestercombe House in Somerset (originally the property of his mother's family), where he designed and laid out the gardens. They are now listed Grade 1 on the English Heritage Register of Parks and Gardens of Special Historic Interest in England.

In November 1758, during the Seven Years' War, he was commissioned as major of the 1st Somerset Militia, which was embodied for fulltime service in home defence on 3 July 1759. The regiment served in the Plymouth defences, and Bampfylde was promoted to lieutenant-colonel in December 1761 on the resignation of Lord North. The regiment was disembodied on 31 December 1762 as the war drew to a close. He was appointed as Colonel of the Regiment on 2 June 1797.

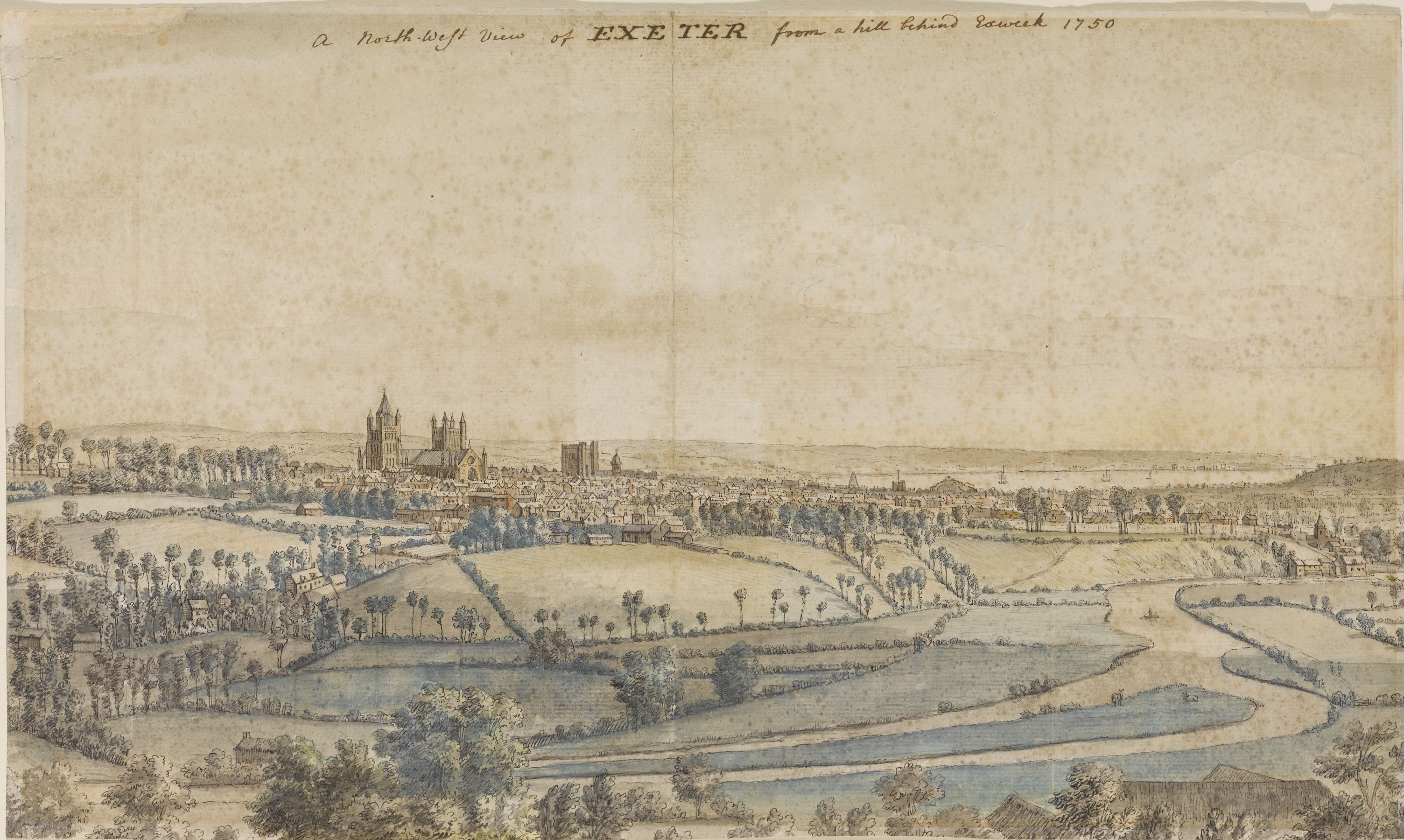
Exeter from Exwick 1750, pen and ink and watercolour on paper, from the Royal Albert Memorial Museum's collection (3/1953/1)

Bampfylde was a notable amateur painter, and exhibited his works at the Society of Artists, the Free Society of Artists, and the Royal Academy between 1763 and 1783. He made a few etchings of landscapes, and drew some humorous illustrations for Christopher Anstey's Election Ball which were etched by William Hassel, and published at Bath in 1776. He also designed the Market House in Taunton in 1772.

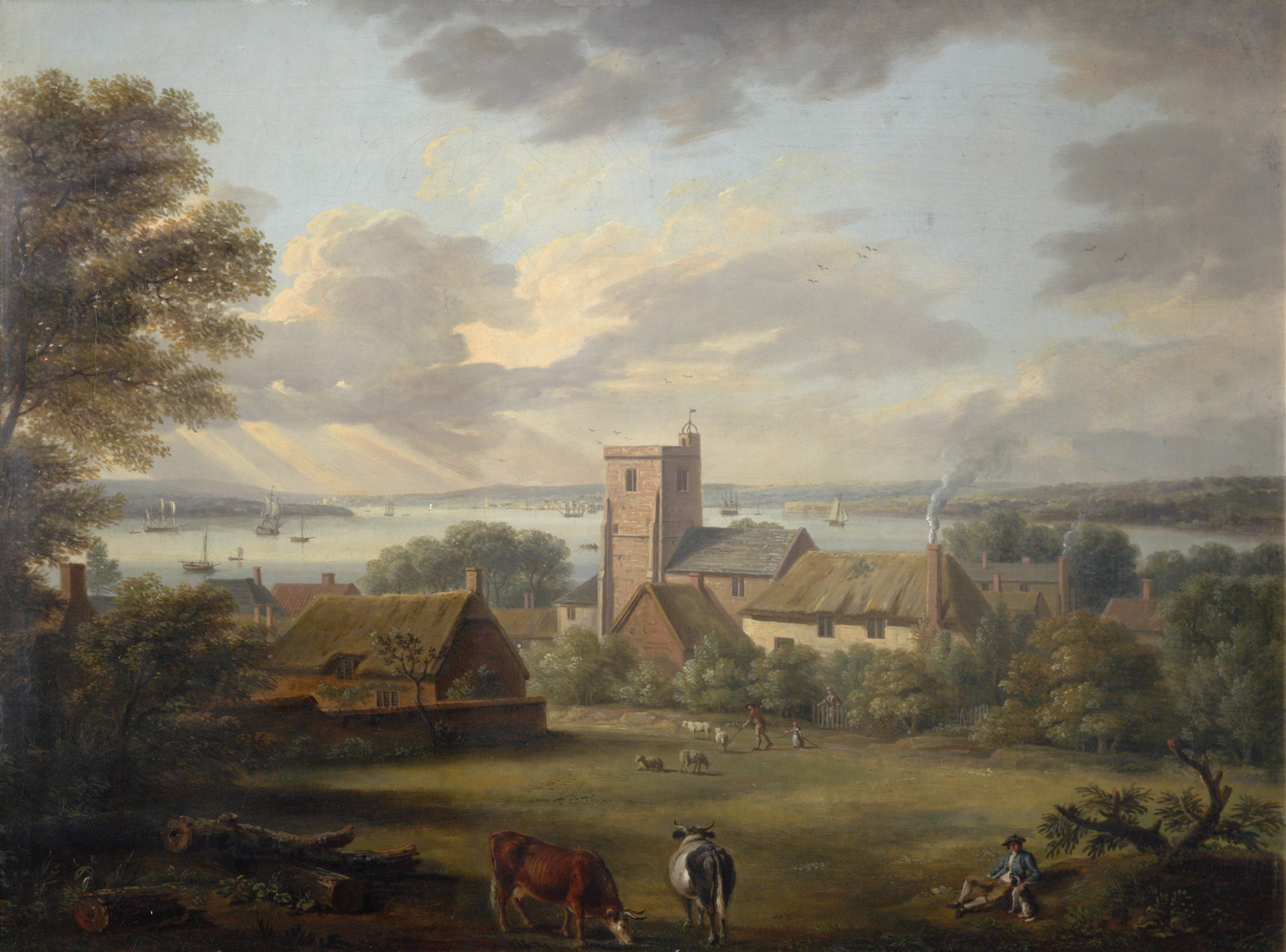
Holy Trinity Church, Exmouth, painted by Coplestone Warre Bampfylde in 1771

He died at Hestercombe on 29 August 1791 and was buried in the Warre family tomb at St Mary's Church, Kingston. He had married Mary Knight (died 1806), daughter of Edward Knight, a Worcestershire ironmaster. They had no children and Hestercombe was left to his nephew, John Tyndale.

There are paintings by Bampfylde in the collections of National Trust, The UK Government and Exeter University.
