= History of Ramsgate =

For Ramsgate as a whole, see the main article Ramsgate.

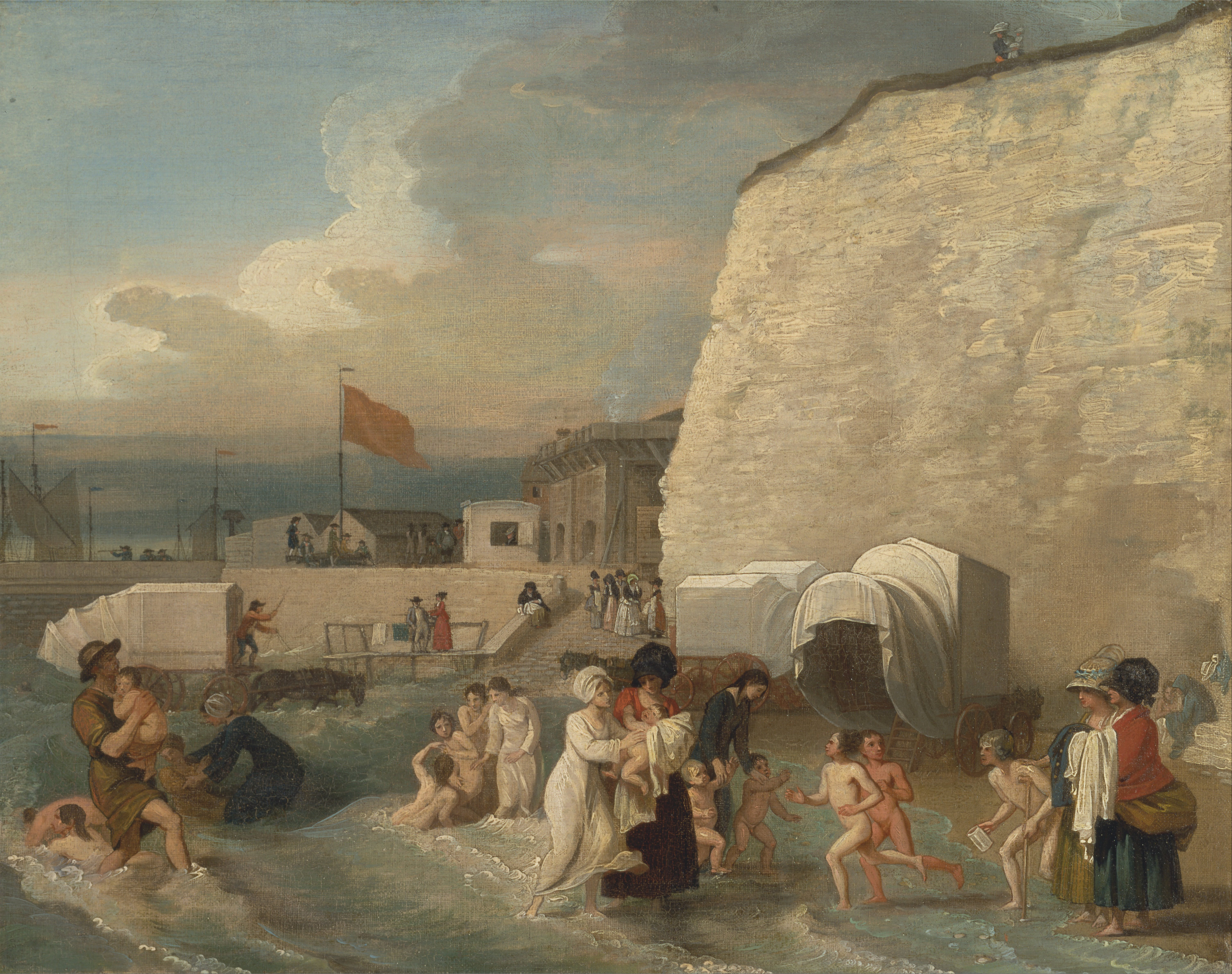
The bathing place at Ramsgate in 1788

Ramsgate as a name has its earliest reference as 'Ramisgate' or 'Remmesgate' in 1275, from Anglo-Saxon 'Hraefn's geat, or 'Raven's cliff gap', later to be rendered 'Ramesgate' from 1357.

== Earlier Ramsgate ==
Ramsgate began as a fishing and farming hamlet. The Christian missionary St Augustine, sent by Pope Gregory the Great, landed near Ramsgate in AD 597. The town is home to the Shrine of St Augustine.

The earliest reference to the town is in the Kent Hundred Rolls of 1274–5, both as Remmesgate (in the local personal name of 'Christina de Remmesgate') and as Remisgat (with reference to the town). The names Ramisgate and Raunsgate appear in the parish of St. Laurence records c. 1290. These are all derived from late Anglo-Saxon 'Hremmes' from earlier 'Hræfnes' (raven's) and 'geat' (gate), with reference to the gap in the cliffs. In 1357, the area became known as Ramesgate.

Ramsgate was a member of the Confederation of Cinque Ports, under the 'Limb' of Sandwich, Kent.

== Georgian and Regency Ramsgate ==
Before the accession of George III, Ramsgate was little more than an off-shoot of the parish of St Lawrence, under the jurisdiction of Sandwich. However, doctors were starting to advocate the benefits of sea-bathing as an all-round tonic and a cure for a wide variety of ailments. So, by the 1750s, seaside towns and hamlets were vying with each other to attract wealthy visitors. The first recorded evidence of this fad in Ramsgate was in 1764, when James Hawkesley was “rated” for two sheds where female clients could undress and wait for a bathing machine to become vacant. Papers, periodicals and refreshments were available and there were boatmen for hire to row gentlemen bathers out into deeper water. The business grew and by the beginning of the 19th century, the number of bathing machines on offer at Ramsgate sands had risen to over 20. The new proprietors, Messrs Barling, Foat and Wells, replaced the sheds with more respectable “Bathing Rooms” and removed the chalk promontory to put in a small row of shops, a bazaar and even a billiard room.

At the same time, Ramsgate began to construct a new harbour. Following the calamitous storm of 1748, a petition was sent to Parliament to build a safe haven at Ramsgate for vessels navigating the Thanet coast and the Goodwin Sands. Despite fierce opposition to the idea from Sandwich, the required act was eventually passed and work started on the port in 1760. It was not a resounding success, as it was in constant danger of being overwhelmed by silt. So in 1774, John Smeaton, the pre-eminent civil engineer of his age, was consulted on the problem. After a number of false starts, Smeaton's new designs for a harbour with piers, sluices and an inner basin were adopted and the bulk of the work was completed by 1790.

However the threat of invasion postponed any further commercial building in favour of the construction of coastal defences. Ramsgate played a pivotal role in the Napoleonic Wars. The naval harbour and garrisons on both cliffs changed the town from a small fashionable watering hole to a place of some military and social consequence in Regency society. The heir to the Duke of Hamilton occupied Mount Albion House, followed by Lady Augusta Murray, sometime wife to Frederick Augustus, the 6th son of George III. Sir William Curtis sumptuously entertained the Prince Regent (George IV) at Cliff House and the Duke of Clarence (William IV) held a ball at Bear's Albion Hotel in 1811, which according to the Times: “in fashion, splendour and elegance exceed anything of the kind ever witnessed in that part of the Kingdom”.

From 1803 to 1807, East Cliff Lodge was the headquarters of Admiral Keith, commanding the North Sea and Channel Fleets. During the same period, Jane Austen’s brother, Francis, organised a corps of “Sea Fencibles” (a sort of naval militia/"dad's army") from the town to protect the South Coast of Britain from invasion. Between 1804 and 1816, over 300 transports came to Ramsgate Harbour to embark more than 50,000 men, horses and materials to the continent. The largest troop movement occurred in 1809, when the disastrous Walcheren Expedition attempted to secure the Dutch island and the port of Flushing. Many of the sick and wounded were returned to Ramsgate, only to die in large numbers and be buried in St Laurence Churchyard.

As the Napoleonic Wars reached a climax, the movement of troops continued. One small boy recalled watching infantry march 6-abreast through the town in lines reaching back from the pier gates to Nethercourt Toll Bar. While Kenneth Beacham Martin (later deputy Harbour Master) remembered the Household Cavalry and Royal Dragoons descending from their barracks on West Cliff to embark on 34 vessels heading for Ostend in the spring of 1815 to join Wellington and to eventually fight in the battle of Waterloo.

In 1821, George IV acceded to the thrones of Britain, Ireland and Hanover. So, to be “elected” in his other dominion, the Royal Squadron departed for the continent from Ramsgate but the new King was so gratified by the hospitality and congratulations he received from the town that on his return the monarch made Ramsgate a “Royal Harbour” – a designation that is still unique in mainland Britain.

However, after the Congress of Vienna, Ramsgate's military importance declined sharply as the threat from France ended and Britain's focus of attention switched from Europe to the colonies. The barracks, stables, parade grounds and gun batteries etc. were sold off to developers and an intense period of building followed.

The development was initiated by the introduction of a steamboat service from London to Margate in 1816. Compared to the day-long coach journey to Brighton, the steamboat enabled travel down the Thames to Thanet in four hours. Consequently, wealthy visitors increasingly chose to spend one or two months in Ramsgate to distance themselves from urban life.

Before 1790, there was not a single dwelling of substance on either cliff. By the time Queen Victoria came to the throne in 1837, Ramsgate was covered with elegant crescents, squares, places and lawns, all with fine bow-fronted Regency houses, embellished by delicate gossamer ironwork and Pagoda-style canopied balconies. To the extent, the town now has more listed buildings from this period per capita than Bath.

Officially, the Ramsgate season ran from August to October but many regular visitors like Samuel Taylor Coleridge preferred to sojourn in late Autumn. Mainly, as a matter of economy. A house on Nelson or Wellington Crescent could command a rent of £16 a month – five or six times more than a gentleman would expect to pay for an equivalent family residence in London but by November, Coleridge could take a room on the cliff for 10s 6d a week and dine out on his table talk.

Originally developed as a watering place, Ramsgate attracted visitors from different social backgrounds. Among the early residents were two of the wealthiest men in the country at the time: Sir William Curtis, who had a residence on the West Cliff, and Moses Montefiore, who had one on the East Cliff. Contemporary accounts also note the presence of prominent political and aristocratic figures in the town. Prime Minister Lord Liverpool was reported to walk along the pier with Foreign Secretary George Canning. At Dyason's Baths, visitors included the Marquess of Wellesley and the Duke of Clarence. The "Heir Presumptive" was also observed taking donkey rides on the beach.

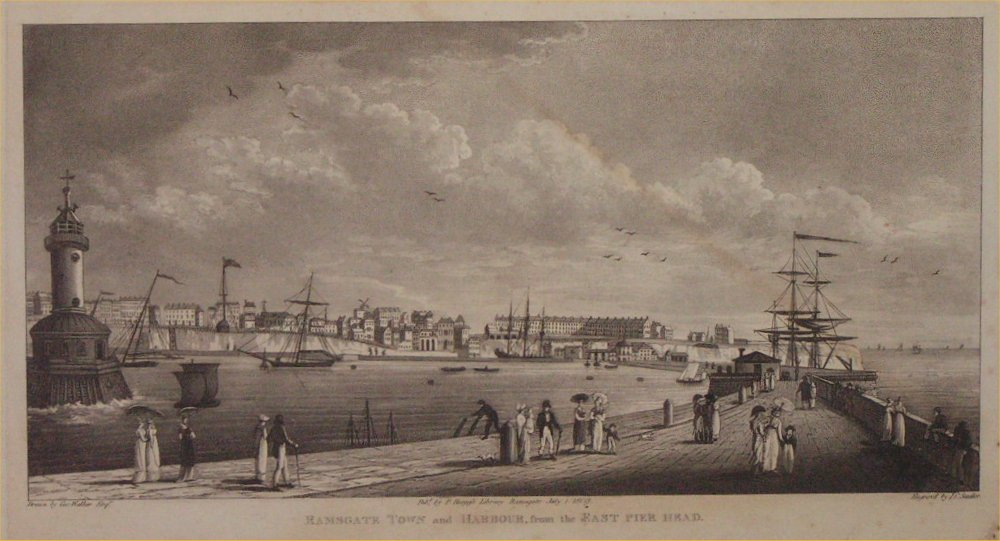
by G walker; engraved J sadler

Princess Victoria first came to Ramsgate in 1823 when she was only four years old and was a regular visitor throughout her childhood, staying at Albion House and Townley House on Chatham Street. Such holidays provided the young princess with some relief from her regimented upbringing. So even as Queen, Victoria loved the town and cherished memories of the seaside, where she was occasionally allowed to play in the sands with her dog or briefly mix with other children.

Ironically, Victoria's reign brought to an end Ramsgate's status as a stylish holiday resort. As medicine progressed, the benefits of seawater were discounted and with the boom in railways, a host of other locations were suddenly within easy and comfortable reach of London. Instead of taking the waters, new fashions emerged among the rich and wealthy – like the country weekend, or a day at the races or a week at the tables. While Royalty now preferred the French Riviera to the North Sea coast. Rents fell and Ramsgate gently declined throughout Victoria's reign. The focus of the town's economy switched to fishing and more everyday tourism. Even the town's harbour was supplanted when Dover built the Western Docks in 1848. So, the last sight on embarkation from Britain was no longer the White Cliffs of Ramsgate, but the White Cliffs of Dover.

== Electric Tramways & Lighting Co. Ltd. ==
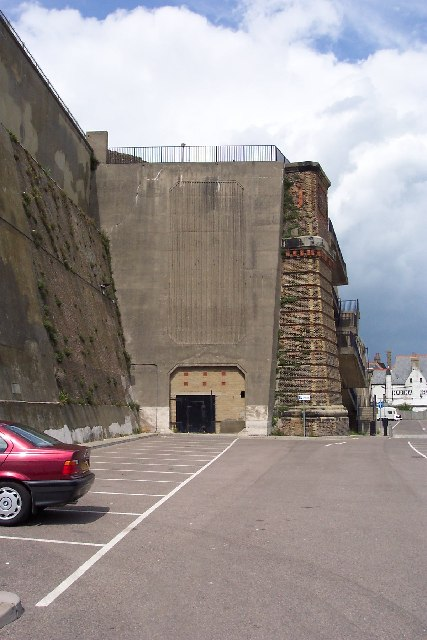
Disused railway tunnel at Ramsgate Harbour, Kent. In 1923 the two competing railway companies that served Kent were merged into the newly formed Southern Railway

At the turn of the 20th century, the Isle of Thanet saw the introduction of about 11 miles (18 km) of track, laid down for the use of the Electric Tramways & Lighting Co. Ltd, which began its service with electric trams on 4 April 1901, linking the towns of Ramsgate, Margate and Broadstairs. On 3 August 1905, an unseasonably wet summer's day, Car No. 41, during a routine descent of the precipitous, and adverse camber leading down Madeira Walk hill into Ramsgate harbour, suddenly careered out of control, jumping the tracks, causing it to crash straight through the railings, so that it then dropped over the 30-foot (9.1 m) cliff edge adjacent. Providentially, only a few passengers were travelling on Car No. 41 that day, and they came out of the ordeal unscathed, but the driver, who was new to the job, sustained some injury. The Electric Tramways & Lighting Co. Ltd. continued to operate with no further significant incidents recorded until its services were replaced with the buses of the East Kent Road Car Co, which began on 27 March 1937.

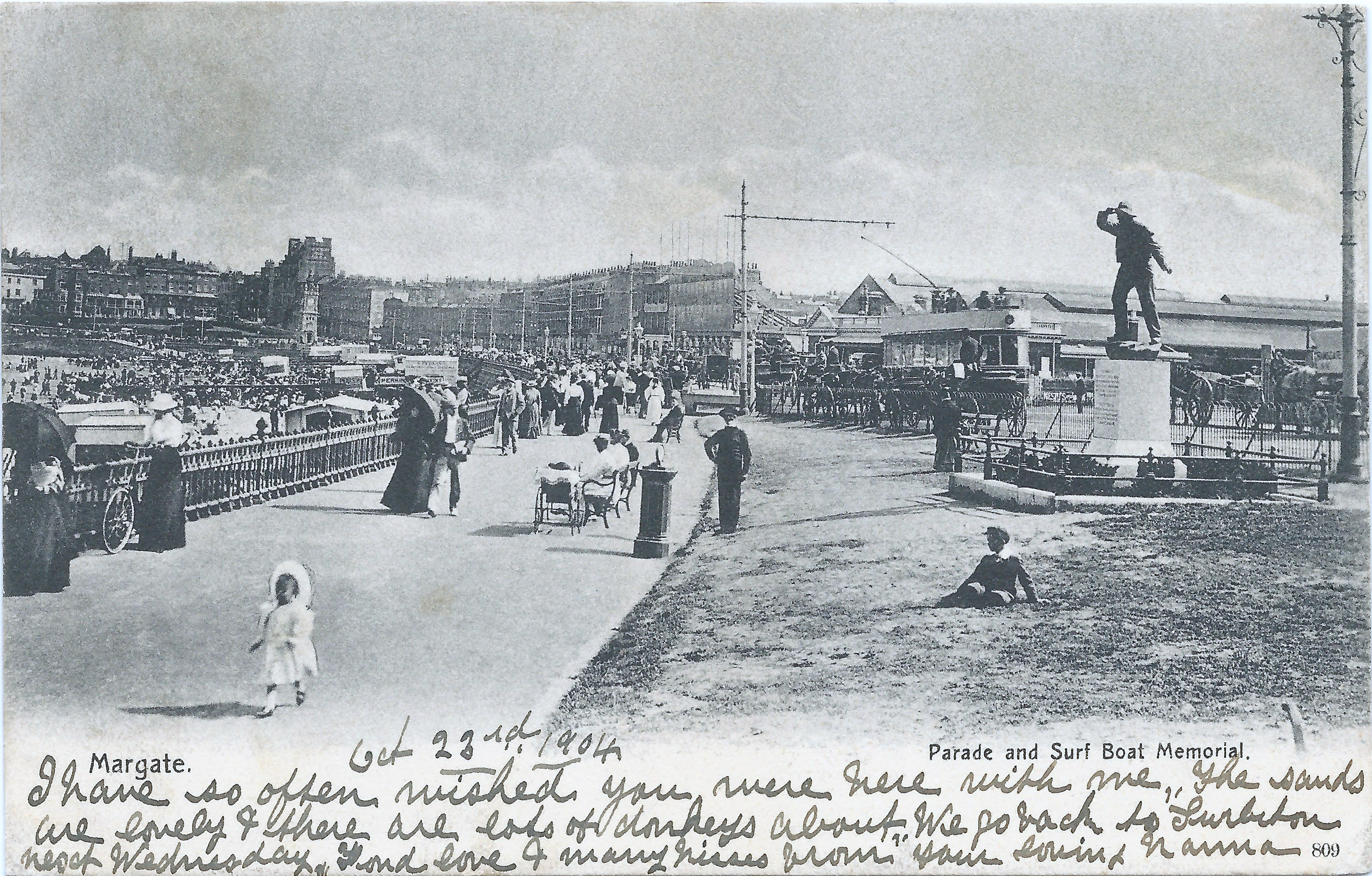
Tram in the background, Margate

This was one of the few inter-urban tramways in Britain, owned by a private company and running through open countryside between the three towns (most of it built over now). Much of the route was on its own right of way, and this only became public roads when the tramway was abandoned.

The line started in Westbrook west of Margate, at the junction of Canterbury and Walton roads. A little tram-shed survived there until recently, and the tram-tracks were to be preserved in the housing development replacing it. Along Canterbury Road and the sea-front, then dividing in two. In the Broadstairs direction, up Paradise Street (now incorporated into Fort Hill dual carriageway); from Broadstairs, down Fort Hill and along King Street. Then Fort Crescent, Athelstan Road, Northdown Road to private track connecting to Lower Northdown Road. This bit is now a public footpath. Lower Northdown Road eastwards to the Wheatsheaf, then cuts across country to Northdown Hill. This bit is a rough track now. Past the main tramshed on the corner, still there and used as factory units, into Westover Road. Church Street (over railway) to St Peters, Albion Road to crossroads, left under railway bridge by Broadstairs station, along Broadstairs High Street to Queens Road, Oscott Road and the seafront. Then along private right of way to Ramsgate, now Dumpton Park Drive. Bellevue Road, Plains of Waterloo, Nelson Crescent, down Madeira Walk to Ramsgate Harbour. Up Royal Parade, Paragon, St Augustines Road, all the way along Grange Road, right at Park Road, to the old South Eastern Railway station where it had its own approach to the south of the station. This was the terminus.

There was also a short-cut between Ramsgate and St Peters called the Top Road, which ran from the crossroads by Broadstairs station, south along Osborne Road, Gladstone Road, across Ramsgate Road and on private right of way (now Salisbury Avenue) to the main line. This was very lightly used and no-one is sure why it was built. Broadstairs town wanted to build a proper town centre at the station crossroads before World War I but could not find the money, and this may have had something to do with it.

The company wanted to extend to Birchington, but was defeated by the landowners of housing estates at Westgate who wanted to keep the riff-raff away. Perhaps as a result, Westgate was refused its application to become a separate urban district because it lacked "civic character" before World War I (it became part of Margate). A line to Pegwell village was also proposed.

The trams were double-decker, but never had roofs on the upper deck, even in winter. This was because the track was narrow-gauge and there were many right-angle bends. Twelve could squeeze into the lower deck, where there were two wooden benches facing each other, but in bad weather the top deck was extremely unpleasant. The service could not hope to compete with buses all year round, even if the trams were fondly remembered on hot summer days.

== Rail ==
Between 1863 and 1926 Ramsgate Harbour was served by its own railway station, and from 1936 to 1965 the harbour was linked to the railway at Dumpton Park by the Tunnel Railway underground railway system.

== Ramsgate at war ==
Because of its proximity to mainland Europe, Ramsgate was a chief embarkation point during the Napoleonic Wars, and for the 1940 Dunkirk evacuation, when 4,200 ships left Ramsgate Harbour to rescue men from the Dunkirk beaches during World War II.

On 24 May 1990 the 50th anniversary of the evacuation of the Dunkirk evacuation was remembered when some 80 of the original 'little ships' gathered at Dover and Ramsgate to repeat the now historic crossing of the channel. Only six out of this fleet had any difficulties, but were assisted by others in the flotilla.

One of these little ships was the first motor lifeboat stationed of Ramsgate which was named the Prudential and had arrived on station by 1926. During World War II the Ramsgate lifeboat and crew were called out 60 times, greatly distinguishing themselves with the saving of 170 lives, in addition to the men brought back from Dunkirk: (Jeff Morris).

One of the Dunkirk 'little ships' still moored at Ramsgate and open to the public is the Motor Yacht Sundowner, (built 1912) once the private yacht of the second officer of the Titanic, C.H. Lightoller, whom surviving that fatal wreck later insisted personally at being at the helm during the evacuation of Dunkirk. He succeeded in bringing home 127 members of the British Expeditionary Force in just one trip.

After these events 42,783 soldiers were transported from Ramsgate railway station, carried by 82 Southern Railway special trains, the second-busiest station during the evacuation, after Dover, which carried over 180,000 men moved by 327 trains.

Shortly before the outbreak of World War II the local council, thanks in large part to the town Mayor Alderman Kempe, decided to enlarge the existing tunnels under the town as a public air-raid shelter - and after the war started the national government finally gave permission to spend the money - it was built and used a lot during the raids. See the Subterranea Britannica website for more details.

There were 692 high explosive bombs, with 84 people killed in total. 373 buildings were destroyed by shells, and 2,414 other buildings suffered damage. Shelling started on 12 February 1941. No other shelling occurred until 28 June 1943, 5 July 1943, 3 October 1943, 3 November 1943, 20 January 1944, with the worst night on 1 September 1944, with most of the deaths. Ten people killed by shells, from 42 shells.

=== Airfields ===
In 1915-1916 early aircraft began to use the open farmlands at Manston as a site for emergency landings. The location near the Kent coast gave Manston some advantages over the other previously established aerodromes. By 1917 the Royal Flying Corps was well established and taking an active part in the defence of England. The aerodrome played an important role in the second World War and is now known as Kent International Airport.

A municipal airport was opened on 1 July 1935, operating until the Second World War broke out in 1939. Following a short spell as a satellite of RAF Manston, it closed in 1940. The airport was re-opened in 1952 and operated until closure in 1968.

== Vincent van Gogh ==
Artist Vincent van Gogh lived in Ramsgate for a year from April 1876, at the age of 23. He boarded at 11 Spencer Square, and obtained work as a teacher at a local school in Royal Road. In one of his letters to his brother Theo, he described his surroundings, “There’s a harbour full of all kinds of ships, closed in by stone jetties running into the sea on which one can walk. And further out one sees the sea in its natural state, and that’s beautiful.” Many artists have been inspired by the light of Thanet, including J. M. W. Turner, who lived in nearby Margate.

== See also ==
- Historic buildings in Ramsgate
- List of people from Ramsgate
