= David Ramsay Steele =

British author (born 1944)

David Ramsay Steele (born 23 June 1944) is a British author. He has published several works, such as The Mystery of Fascism: David Ramsay Steele's Greatest Hits (2019, a collection of 23 previously published articles), Orwell Your Orwell: A Worldview on the Slab (2017, a study of George Orwell's beliefs), Atheism Explained: From Folly to Philosophy (2008, a popular exposition of atheism) and From Marx to Mises: Post-Capitalist Society and the Challenge of Economic Calculation (1992, an exposition of the economic calculation problem). Since 1985, he has been Editorial Director of Open Court Publishing Company. In 1997, he co-wrote with Michael R. Edelstein Three Minute Therapy: Change Your Thinking, Change Your Life, a psychological self-help book based on Albert Ellis's rational emotive behavior therapy, re-released in paperback, 2019. In 2013, he co-wrote with Michael R. Edelstein and Richard K. Kujoth Therapy Breakthrough: Why Some Psychotherapies Work Better than Others, a study of cognitive-behavioral therapy arguing for its superiority to psychodynamic therapy. From 1963 to 1973, Steele was a member of the Socialist Party of Great Britain (SPGB). In 1970, he became aware of the historical debate over economic calculation and between 1970 and 1973 underwent an intellectual conversion from SPGB Marxism to libertarianism. He later co-founded the Libertarian Alliance and in 1982 would be identified with one of the two factions that resulted in the split of the group.

== Works ==
=== Books ===
- Steele, David Ramsay (1992). From Marx to Mises: Post-Capitalist Society and the Challenge of Economic Calculation. La Salle, Ill.: Open Court. ISBN 0-87548-449-2. OCLC 26934946.
- Edelstein, Michael R.; Steele, David Ramsay (1997). Three Minute Therapy: Change Your Thinking, Change Your Life. Lakewood, Colo.: Glenbridge Pub. ISBN 0-944435-42-4. OCLC 37784952.
- Steele, David Ramsay (2008). Atheism Explained: From Folly to Philosophy. Chicago, Ill.: Open Court. ISBN 978-0-8126-9703-2. OCLC 701110315.
- Edelstein, Michael R.; Kujoth, Richard K.; Steele, David Ramsay (2013). Therapy Breakthrough: Why Some Psychotherapies Work Better Than Others. Chicago. ISBN 978-0-8126-9686-8. OCLC 863660808.
- Steele, David Ramsay (2017). Orwell your Orwell: A Worldview on the Slab. South Bend, Indiana. ISBN 978-1-58731-610-4. OCLC 965120240.
- Steele, David Ramsay (2019). The Mystery of Fascism: David Ramsay Steele's Greatest Hits. South Bend, Indiana. ISBN 978-1-58731-529-9. OCLC 1083224946.

=== Other ===
- "Smash Cash", Oz, issue 17 (December 1968) Smash Cash.
- "Posing the Problem: The Impossibility of Economic Calculation Under Socialism", Journal of Libertarian Studies volume 5 #1 ( Winter 1981) pp 7–22.
- "The Failure of Bolshevism and Its Aftermath", Journal of Libertarian Studies volume 5 #1 (Winter 1981) pp 99–111.
- "Attempted Theft of an Organisation", The Journal of the Libertarian Alliance volume 3 #3 (1983).
- Steele, David Ramsay (1987). "The irrationality of planning". Critical Review. 1 (2): 51–57. doi:10.1080/08913818708459487. ISSN 0891-3811.
- "Hayek's Theory of Cultural Group Selection", Journal of Libertarian Studies volume 8 #2.
- "Karl Marx: Das Kapital: From Capitalist Exploitation to Communist Revolution" Great Economic Thinkers (sound recording, 1988).
- Steele, David Ramsay (1 January 1988). "How we got here". Critical Review. 2 (1): 111–143. doi:10.1080/08913818908459518. ISSN 0891-3811.
- "Partial Recall", Liberty volume 7 #3 (1994).
- "Why Stop at Term Limits?", National Review volume 47 #17 (1995).
- Steele, David Ramsay (1996). "Nozick on Sunk Costs". Ethics. 106 (3): 605–620. doi:10.1086/233649. ISSN 0014-1704. S2CID 155096768.
- "Between Immorality and Unfeasibility: The Market Socialist Predicament", Critical Review v10 #3 (1996).
- "Yes, Gambling Is Productive and Rational", Liberty (1997), reprinted in A Rhetoric of Argument by Jeanne Fahnestock and Marie Secor.
- "The Strange Life of Murray Rothbard", Liberty (2000).
- "Alice in Wonderland: A Review of The Passion of Ayn Rand by Barbara Branden", Free Life (2001).
- "The Mystery of Fascism", Liberty (2001).
- "Porn, Rape and Justice" (15 April 2001).
- Genius – In their Own Words: The Intellectual Journeys of Seven Great 20th-Century Thinkers (editor, 2002).
- "An Unexpected Discovery", Liberty v16 #7 (2002).
- "Ayn Rand and the Curse of Kant", Liberty v16 #8 (2002).
- "The Sacred Element", Liberty v17 #3 (2003).
- "My Orwell Right or Wrong", Liberty v17 #5 (2003).
- “Wasn't It a Little Crowded on that Grassy Knoll?”, Liberty v17 #11 (2003).
- "Life, Liberty, and the Treadmill", Liberty (2005).
- "Why and When Should We Rely on Scientific Experts?" in Heldke et al., The Atkins Diet and Philosophy (2005).
- "Marxism" in Tom Flynn (ed), The New Encyclopedia of Unbelief (2007).
- "Marx, Karl Heinrich" in Tom Flynn (ed), The New Encyclopedia of Unbelief (2007).
- Steele, David Ramsay (2008). "Orwell, George (1903–1950)". The Encyclopedia of Libertarianism. Thousand Oaks, CA: SAGE; Cato Institute. pp. 366–368. doi:10.4135/9781412965811.n224. ISBN 978-1412965804. LCCN 2008009151. OCLC 750831024.
- "Will Emerging Media Create a Collective Mind?" in Juliet Floyd and James E. Katz, eds., Philosophy of Emerging Media: Understanding, Appreciation, Application (2016).
- "What Follows from the Nonexistence of Mental Illness?" in Jeffrey A. Schaler, Henry Zvi Lothane, and Richard E. Vatz, eds., Thomas S. Szasz: The Man and His Ideas (2017).
- "How I Could Have Made Hillary President" in Daniel Yim, Galen Foresman, and Robert Arp (eds) Scott Adams and Philosophy: A Hole in the Fabric of Reality (2018).
- "Is It a Fact that Facts Don't Matter?" in Daniel Yim, Galen Foresman, and Robert Arp (eds) Scott Adams and Philosophy: A Hole in the Fabric of Reality (2018).
- "Scott Adams and the Pinocchio Fallacy" in Daniel Yim, Galen Foresman, and Robert Arp (eds) Scott Adams and Philosophy: A Hole in the Fabric of Reality (2018).
