= Chris Tame =

British writer (1949–2006)

Chris R. Tame
- Born: Christopher Ronald Tame; 20 December 1949; Enfield, Middlesex, England, United Kingdom
- Died: 20 March 2006 (aged 56)
- Education: Hull University
- Occupations: Journalist, writer

Christopher Ronald Tame (20 December 1949 – 20 March 2006) was an English libertarian political activist. He is best known as the founder and Director of the Libertarian Alliance, a free market and civil liberties think tank.

== Early years ==
Tame was born on 20 December 1949 in Enfield, Middlesex. His father, Ronald Ernest Tame, was a printer who had spent the war in the Eighth Army as an escort to Montgomery and had been mentioned in dispatches. He later became a process engraver and shop steward, and he and Tame's mother Elsie Florence, a nurse, had met and married just after the end of the Second World War. Tame was an only child, who grew up in post-war Britain.

He was brought up in Godalming in Surrey, where his family had moved. He attended a local Church of England primary school, and then grammar school. In 1971, he graduated from Hull University with a degree in American Studies.

== The Libertarian Alliance ==
Tame joined the Conservative students' organisation at Hull, and became active in the organisation. Disillusioned by the interventionist and authoritarian mindset, he left and never went back. He had felt that the Conservative Party was dominated by a "corporate elite" wedded to a "corrupt state capitalism." He announced his departure from the rostrum at an annual Federation of Conservative Students conference in the early 1970s.

In 1967, Tame founded the Libertarian Alliance as an informal discussion group, drawing ideas from Ayn Rand, among others. The organisation was formalised in 1979, with a structure of Tame as its President, and the Alliance was based in the Alternative Bookshop which Tame had opened in Covent Garden in London a year earlier. The Bookshop was advertised in National Association for Freedom's journal, 'The Free Nation.'

After university, Tame settled in London, where he worked mainly for the Institute of Economic Affairs and the National Association for Freedom.

In 1978, Tame set up the Alternative Bookshop and was its manager. The shop became a "mecca" of classical liberals, anarchists, and free-marketers, and was once target of a Molotov cocktail and of Socialist workers. The bookshop closed its doors in 1985 due to an unaffordable rent increase.

== Political beliefs ==
Tame did not believe in seeking political power nor propagandising the masses, but saw the importance of influencing the intellectual debate. Under the umbrella of the Libertarian Alliance, he published prolifically. One such work published in 1989 bore the title "Taxation is Theft". In addition to writing, he enjoyed engaging in debate with visitors to his shop.

Tame was equally opposed to censorship. During the Thatcher years, he exposed the contradictions of Conservatives who claimed to support free market economics yet demanded that "obscene" publications be censored. At the Conservative Party conference in 1990, Tame disrupted a rally organised by Christian morality campaigner Mary Whitehouse by engineering an intervention by scantily clad models claiming to be "Conservatives against sex censorship."

== The Conservative Party ==
In the early 1980s, Tame was recruited by Sir Keith Joseph at the Department of Trade and Industry to prepare a reading list to wean civil servants off the interventionist mindset in favour of genuine free markets and privatisation.

Being a monetarist, Tame was influential in convincing Margaret Thatcher, Geoffrey Howe and Joseph that inflation was due to problems of controlling the money supply, debunking the conventional Tory wisdom that it was due to greedy trade unions, speculators, oil sheikhs or other "phantoms."

== Journalism ==
In the mid-1980s, Tame was a producer on Channel 4's Diverse Reports, a series which looked at topical issues with libertarian and socialist perspectives.

In 1983, while researching for an article on how easy it was to acquire guns, grenades and other military items with a credit card by mail order from the United States, Tame duly did so and carried his acquired collection of light armaments in his knapsack to work further in the library at the American Embassy in Grosvenor Square, London. He was arrested, charged and subsequently acquitted.

== FOREST and Smokers' Rights ==
He was a non-smoker and keep-fit enthusiast, but he philosophically regarded that smokers' bodies were their own and that a person's liberty must extend to the freedom to make foolish decisions in this regard. He defended the rights of tobacco smokers as Director of pressure group FOREST from 1988 to 1995. During his time with FOREST he was an extensive user of Westminster libraries requesting many obscure books which were supplied by the British Library Document Supply Centre to the Great Smith Street branch. He saw off three Directors of ASH and forced ASH to refocus the debate away from the paternalistic desire to preserve the health of the smoker or would-be smoker to the harm of passive smoking to non-smokers. In 1992, he won libel damages after successfully suing LBC Radio, which accused him of "introducing young children to cigarettes and assisting in killing 110,000 people a year." In 1995, FOREST removed Tame as director, as its tobacco industry sponsors believed Tame's approach had become too confrontational and abstract.

== Later years ==
In the later part of his life, Tame moved to Ramsgate, where he had been working on a seven-volume Bibliography of Freedom.

Tame was an avid collector of economic and philosophical books, and had amassed a collection of some 40,000 works, including a number of rare classical liberal documents, some of which were donated to the Foundation for Economic Education in New York. A large part of the rest of his collection was donated to Faculty of Economics, that is part of Prague school of Economics and Business in Czechia. He also was an avid user of the public library system notably Westminster Library and the Great Smith Street library.

Tame died on 20 March 2006 from an aggressive bone cancer, diagnosed a year before. He was twice divorced and childless.

== Legacy ==
Since Tame's death, the Libertarian Alliance, under Sean Gabb and then President Tim Evans, awarded a number of 'Chris R. Tame Memorial Prizes.' In 2008, this was awarded to American left-anarchist Keith Preston for his essay 'Free Enterprise: The Antidote to Corporate Plutocracy.' In 2010, the 'Chris R. Tame Memorial Lecture' was delivered by Stephen Davies of the Institute of Economic Affairs.

Non-profit organization positions
Preceded by Position Established	Director of the Libertarian Alliance; 1979–2005	Succeeded by Sean Gabb
