= FOREST =

Lobby group in the United Kingdom

Freedom Organisation for the Right to Enjoy Smoking Tobacco
- Abbreviation: FOREST
- Formation: 1979; 47 years ago
- Founder: Christopher Foxley-Norris
- Type: Political pressure group
- Headquarters: Cambridge, England
- Region served: United Kingdom and Ireland
- Director: Simon Clark
- Subsidiaries: Forest Éireann
- Website: www.forestonline.org

FOREST (short for "Freedom Organisation for the Right to Enjoy Smoking Tobacco") is a United Kingdom smokers' rights group primarily funded by the tobacco industry, which campaigns against what it sees as "excessive regulation" of smoking and tobacco products.

== Early history ==
In 1978, Christopher Foxley-Norris approached the major British tobacco companies regarding a possible Tobacco Consumers' Association. Foxley-Norris, a pipe and cigar smoker, said that he was concerned about the increasing interference by "the Government and other do-gooding bodies" in people's lives, and that he was surprised that the industry had not put up any coordinated response to anti-smoking measures. He added that, having retired from the Royal Air Force in 1974, he was seeking a salaried position in such an organisation to supplement his pension.

At around the same time, Geoffrey Charles Evans, a cigarette smoker and formerly General Secretary of the National Union of Retail Tobacconists made similar proposals to industry figures.

The Tobacco Advisory Committee (TAC), the then British tobacco industry trade association, agreed that the time was right to launch a pro-smoking group. TAC stated that the new organisation would need to "be closely controlled and supported by the industry, but be seen to be sufficiently independent to maintain its credibility".

After some debate as to whether Evans or Foxley-Norris should run the group, FOREST was launched on 19 June 1979, with Foxley-Norris chairman and Evans chief executive, the men being the group's first two members.

Soon after launch, a March 1980 TAC memo showed that the tobacco industry felt that there was confusion about the organisation's purpose, doubts as to the effectiveness of FOREST's activities, and continuing uncertainty as to whether it should endeavour to recruit a mass membership or continue to serve the industry directly. Further doubts were expressed over FOREST's direction by TAC figures in 1981, with some companies questioning whether to continue funding the group, or to establish a different, more effective group.

A model for a pro-smoking pressure group was agreed by TAC members, and it was further agreed that this model would be applied to the existing FOREST organisation, rather than attempting to establish a new pro-smoking group. The restructured FOREST would require a new chief executive to replace Evans, and would not only react to news and tobacco control developments, but would seek to make its news in the form of conducting research and lobbying. Individual members were seen as 'desirable', but not essential.

== Leadership and influence ==
FOREST's dependence on tobacco industry funding has ensured considerable industry influence upon its leadership and direction. When, by 1981, FOREST was felt by the TAC members to be ineffective, Stephen Eyres was selected as Director of a restructured organisation. From this point on, the leadership of FOREST has tended to be drawn from amongst elements of the libertarian movement.

The 1981 restructuring proposal stated that "If money invested [in FOREST] is to be properly effective then control and management are essential" and that contact between the Executive Director of FOREST and the Tobacco Advisory Council should be made "on an almost daily basis." However, given that "nobody of worth to a campaigning organisation can be run on too tight a rein", funding would be guaranteed on an annual basis.

Evans continued to be involved for some time until dying in 1987. Eyres, meanwhile, was suffering from increasing ill-health as a result of HIV, and Chris Tame was recruited to succeed both as the organisation's effective leader in 1988; a non-smoker, Tame voiced a concern about the potential wider impact of measures to reduce exposure from second-hand smoke, arguing from a libertarian perspective that individuals' right to make their own health decisions may need defending.

Foxley-Norris remained a public figurehead until retiring in 1989, and was replaced by Lord Harris of High Cross, general director of the Institute of Economic Affairs, and a pipe smoker. In September 1989 Eyres, still employed by FOREST, was accused of misusing Forest funds to buy first class flights to Australia and a property in Spain. The tobacco industry was keen to avoid any publicity and Eyres' resignation, effective as of 1 October 1989, and an agreement not to discuss the circumstances of the termination of his employment, was confirmed in a High Court judgement, of November 1989. Eyres died in 1990.

Harris remained as chairman of FOREST until his death in 2006, while Tame, who took over from Eyres as director of the organisation, continued in the position until 1995, when he was removed by the tobacco industry following concerns about his approach. Eyres was replaced by Marjorie Nicholson, who had previously been the organisation's campaign manager, standing for Parliament at the 1994 Dudley West by-election under the FOREST name.

The current director, Simon Clark, took over from Nicholson in 1999. Launching a spin-off campaign entitled 'The Free Society', a more general campaign against the perceived nanny state, Clark stated "If people wish to eat themselves to death by eating too much fatty food that has to be their choice".

== Media profile ==
Foxley-Norris was interviewed on 25 July 1979 by BBC London, criticising measures such as smoke-free regulations which had been introduced on Glasgow public transport and asking members of the public to join FOREST at the cost of £1/year.

FOREST spokespeople continue to appear on television and radio in the United Kingdom and are quoted by British newspapers and broadcasters as representatives of a pro-tobacco viewpoint. Despite this media visibility, FOREST's internal communications to the tobacco industry have argued that its real successes "cannot be publicised":

Measuring FOREST purely in terms of media coverage denies the existence of other work in which it is engaged but which cannot be publicised. In short, if others can be persuaded to "sing the same tune" this is of more value than anything that might be said by the tobacco industry itself, or FOREST.

Less direct techniques have also been made use of to maximise media impact while promoting an appearance of independence from the tobacco industry. This is acknowledged in FOREST's 1985 Directors' report, stating that "the arms-length relationship with the industry has worked to the benefit of both parties" and noting that letter-writers were "retained" to provide an active local media presence.

== Funding and membership ==
Marketing itself as the "voice and friend of the smoker", FOREST has nevertheless been described as an astroturf front group created and primarily funded by the tobacco industry. Its establishment was planned by the Tobacco Advisory Committee, the British tobacco industry trade association. At a 1979 meeting, the Tobacco Advisory Committee discussed the launch of FOREST as well as ways to maintain its appearance of independence.

After its founding, membership campaigns were not successful in recruiting a broad support base which could make the organisation self-financing. In one instance, 10,000 cigarette retailers were solicited to join FOREST, but only four joined. Financial support from the tobacco industry thus remains the main source of funding for FOREST.

== Notable supporters ==
While opposing proposals to restrict smoking in public places, FOREST attracted the support of celebrity smokers including artist David Hockney, inventor Trevor Baylis, musician Joe Jackson, chef Antony Worrall Thompson, and politician Claire Fox. Its more recent campaign to reverse smoke-free workplace regulations in licensed premises lists several politicians as supporters (see below).

== Developments following the smoking ban ==
In February 2006, FOREST lost its fight against comprehensive smoke-free workplace regulations in England, achieved via a House of Commons free vote and subsequently implemented on 1 July 2007. Complementing smoke-free workplace regulations already introduced in Scotland (March 2006), Northern Ireland and Wales (both April 2007), these included all pubs, bars, cafés and restaurants, private members' clubs and any indoor workplace. Following this UK-wide defeat, FOREST undertook to continue to lobby under a 'freedom of choice' banner.

In 2010, FOREST launched an Irish branch, "Forest Éireann" – the Republic of Ireland having instituted nationwide smoke-free workplace regulations in March 2004. Forest Éireann's stated aim was "to represent smokers in Ireland", replicating the activities of its parent group in the United Kingdom. In September 2010, Forest Éireann published a report stating that the ban on indoor smoking had been the cause of a decline in trade experienced by Irish pubs, and calling for the ban to be relaxed. As of 2010, the spokesman for the Irish group was John Mallon, a sales manager and former oil rigger.

Concern about the potential impact of smoke-free regulations upon the income of publicans and licensees was also a theme in FOREST's opposition to smoke-free workplace measures in the UK. FOREST launched its 'Save Our Pubs and Clubs' campaign in 2009, with Greg Knight, Conservative MP, and Anthony Worrall-Thompson in attendance. It was backed by David Clelland, Labour MP, John Hemming, Liberal Democrat MP, and Nigel Farage MEP, the leader of UKIP. The campaign called for pubs and clubs to be able to choose whether to allow smoking and listed as supporters the Working Men's Club and Institute Union, the Adam Smith Institute, thinktank Progressive Vision and the Manifesto Club.

== See also ==
- Action on Smoking and Health
- Tobacco control
