= Libertarian Alliance =

Two libertarian think tanks with the same name

- The logo of the Libertarian Alliance
- Predecessor: Radical Libertarian Alliance and Mises Centre UK
- Formation: 1977; 49 years ago
- Founders: Mark Brady, Judy Englander, David Ramsay Steele and Chris Tame
- Type: Think tank
- Headquarters: London
- Website: www.la-articles.org.uk

The Libertarian Alliance (LA) refers to two libertarian think tanks in the UK. Originally one organisation, it split in 1982. One Libertarian Alliance was renamed "Mises UK" in 2017; the remaining Libertarian Alliance holds regular meetings in London.

== Early history ==
The Libertarian Alliance was founded to advocate the abolition of taxation and government intervention in economic and social life.

With ancestral ties to the Liberty and Property Defence League of Lord Elcho and Sir Ernest Benn's Society of Individualists, the LA was founded in the 1970s by Mark Brady, Judy Englander, David Ramsay Steele and Chris Tame in Woking. It was an alliance of libertarians, minarchists, anarchists, and classical liberals. The LA was perceived to be the continuation of the Radical Libertarian Alliance founded by Brady and Tame in late 1971, or the earlier Young Libertarians founded by David Myddelton in the late 1960s.

The principles of the LA were formulated by the founding members, and written out by David Ramsay Steele in its first Tactical Note. At its founding, the LA had no official leader, but had a chairperson, secretary, and a treasurer. The Alternative Bookshop, formed in 1978, became the unofficial hub of LA activities for a time. The Alternative Bookshop, with Tame as its manager, was advertised in the National Association for Freedom's publication, The Free Nation.

In 1982 a power struggle within the organisation caused a split. From then until 2017 there were two groups calling themselves the Libertarian Alliance and using the same logo and using the phrase "Let a Thousand Libertarian Alliances Bloom!".

== After 1982 ==
=== The Tame Libertarian Alliance ===
The organisation led by Chris Tame from 1982 until his death in March 2006, was led by Sean Gabb from 2006 to 2017, whose involvement with the Libertarian Alliance dated back to December 1979. The Tame-Gabb Libertarian Alliance owned the libertarian.co.uk website, and managed The Libertarian Alliance Blog. In 2015 Gabb's Libertarian Alliance was recognised by HMRC as an educational charity.

The Tame-Gabb LA for many years held dinners and conferences with high-profile speakers as Adam Smith Institute Director Eamonn Butler and libertarian writer Claire Fox in 2006, anarcho-capitalist philosophers David D. Friedman and Hans-Hermann Hoppe in 2008, and LGBT activist Peter Tatchell and Conservative Party Member of Parliament Steve Baker in 2010. Since 2010, there have been no such events, with the focus being on publications, social media, and the Free Life Podcast.

The Tame-Gabb Libertarian Alliance was a member of Backlash, which was formed in 2005 in order to oppose a new law criminalising possession of "extreme pornography".

In June 2017, Gabb gave the Libertarian Alliance to Keir Martland, who renamed it Mises UK. Mises UK maintains the Libertarian Alliance Archives, which "include nearly 800 pamphlets in print and from more than 150 authors". As of 2023, the website is offline.

=== The McDonagh Libertarian Alliance ===
The Libertarian Alliance run by David McDonagh holds regular talks in London. There is evidence of a rapprochement between the two Libertarian Alliances, with some of these talks being given by Sean Gabb and Keir Martland. They also maintain archives of the Libertarian Alliance magazine "Free Life".
