= Stephen Edwin Yarnold =

Australian army chaplain

Stephen Edwin Yarnold (9 August 1903 – 25 September 1978) was an Australian army chaplain and Presbyterian minister. Yarnold was born in Ramsgate, Kent, England and died in Silvan, Victoria.

== See also ==
- Francis Ormond
- Colin Macdonald Gilray
- Arthur Augustus Calwell
